= List of members of the 5th Bundestag =

←	4th	6th	→

Overview
- Legislative body: Bundestag
- Term: October 19, 1965 – October 19, 1969
- Election: 1965 West German federal election
- Government: Second Erhard cabinet Kiesinger cabinet
- Members: 518
- President of the Bundestag: Eugen Gerstenmaier

The 5th German Bundestag, the lower house of parliament of the Federal Republic of Germany, was elected on 3 October 1965 and existed between 19 October 1965 and 19 October 1969. It held a total of 247 parliamentary sessions with the last one being held on 3 July 1969.

On 20 October 1965 the Bundestag elected Ludwig Erhard (CDU) as federal Chancellor of the Federal Republic of Germany with 272 (+6) (Note: During the existence of West Germany the Abgeordnetenhaus of Berlin elected representatives to the Bundestag for West Berlin. But since they were prohibited by an international treaty to participate in Germany's legislative process, their votes were trivial.)yes votes, 200 (+15) no-votes and 15 (+1) abstentions on the first ballot. After his resignation on 30 November 1966 Kurt Georg Kiesinger (CDU) was elected as his successor on 1 December 1966.

== Presidium of the Bundestag ==
Konrad Adenauer, the former federal Chancellor, served as Alterspräsident (Father of the House) until his death on 17 April 1967. He was succeeded by Arthur Enk who was from the CDU as well. As Alterspräsident Adenauer presided over the Konstituierende Sitzung, the first parliamentary session, until Eugen Gerstenmaier was elected as President of the Bundestag.

Carlo Schmid, Erwin Schoettle (both from the SPD), Richard Jaeger (CSU) and Thomas Dehler (FDP) were elected to be vice-presidents of the Bundestag. Although the Geschäftsordnung des Deutschen Bundestages (Rules of Procedure of the German Bundestag) required a secret ballot which was advocated by Franz-Josef Wuermeling. But after President Gerstenmaier pointed out, that the Bundestag was allowed to deviate from its Geschäftsordnung, if a supermajority agreed which it did, the candidates were elected by raising one's hand. The candidates were elected separately. All of the candidates had held the office during the previous legislative term. On 26 October 1965 Richard Jaeger became Federal Minister of Justice and Maria Probst (CDU) was elected to succeed him on 9 December. After her death on 1 May 1967 Richard Jaeger returned to the presidium for the CDU/CSU. Carlo Schmid was appointed as Federal Minister of the Bundesrat and State Affa

irs. on 1 December 1966 and was succeeded by Karl Mommer on 14 December. He was elected unanimously. Because Thomas Dehler died on 21 July 1967, Walter Scheel was elected to succeed him as the FDPs vice president on 8 September 1967.

Eugen Gerstenmaier was elected as President of the Bundestag during the Konstituierende Sitzung with 384 yes votes, 21 no votes, 98 abstentions and 4 invalid votes to a third term. After his resignation on 31 January 1969 due to criticism over Wiedergutmachungs payments Kai-Uwe von Hassel was elected as President of the Bundestag on 5 February 1969. He received 262 of 457 of the votes.

== Summary ==
This summary includes changes in the numbers of the three caucuses (CDU/CSU, SPD, FDP):

Time	Reason of change	CDU/CSU	SPD	FDP	Others	Total number
1965	First meeting	245	202	49		496
13 October 1967	Walther Hellige leaves the FDP caucus and becomes unaffiliated	245	202	48	1	496
24 October 1967	Walther Hellige becomes member of the CDU/CSU caucus	246	202	48		496
13 May 1969	Reinhold Rehs leaves the SPD caucus and become members of the CDU/CSU caucus	247	201	48		496

== Members ==
The following is the list of members of the 5th Bundestag:

State	No.	Constituency	Member	Party
Schleswig-Holstein	1	Flensburg	Will Rasner	CDU
Schleswig-Holstein	2	Schleswig – Eckernförde	Gerhard Stoltenberg	CDU
Schleswig-Holstein	3	Husum	Hermann Glüsing	CDU
Schleswig-Holstein	4	Steinburg – Süderdithmarschen	Kai-Uwe von Hassel	CDU
Schleswig-Holstein	5	Rendsburg – Neumünster	Detlef Struve	CDU
Schleswig-Holstein	6	Kiel	Hans Müthling	SPD
Schleswig-Holstein	7	Plön	Friedrich-Karl Storm	CDU
Schleswig-Holstein	8	Segeberg – Eutin	Hans-Jürgen Klinker	CDU
Schleswig-Holstein	9	Pinneberg	Rolf Bremer	CDU
Schleswig-Holstein	10	Stormarn – Herzogtum Lauenburg	Olaf Baron von Wrangel	CDU
Schleswig-Holstein	11	Lübeck	Helmut Wendelborn	CDU
Schleswig-Holstein	List		Bruno Diekmann	SPD
Schleswig-Holstein	List		Detlef Haase	SPD
Schleswig-Holstein	List		Karl Regling	SPD
Schleswig-Holstein	List		Reinhold Rehs	SPD
Schleswig-Holstein	List		Annemarie Renger	SPD
Schleswig-Holstein	List		Fritz Sänger	SPD
Schleswig-Holstein	List		Richard Tamblé	SPD
Schleswig-Holstein	List		Otto Eisenmann (Note: Otto Eisenmann resigned on 1 June 1967.)	FDP
Schleswig-Holstein	List		Walter Peters	FDP
Schleswig-Holstein	List		Wolfgang Imle (Note: Wolfgang Imle took office on 2 June 1967, to succeed Otto Eisenmann.)	FDP
Schleswig-Holstein	List		Hans Blöcker	CDU
Hamburg	12	Hamburg-Mitte	Eugen Glombig	SPD
Hamburg	13	Altona	Karl Wilhelm Berkhan	SPD
Hamburg	14	Eimsbüttel	Peter Blachstein	SPD
Hamburg	15	Hamburg-Nord I	Hans Apel	SPD
Hamburg	16	Hamburg-Nord II	Rolf Meinecke	SPD
Hamburg	17	Wandsbek	Ilse Elsner	SPD
Hamburg	18	Bergedorf	Nikolaus Jürgensen	SPD
Hamburg	19	Harburg	Herbert Wehner	SPD
Hamburg	List		Irma Blohm	CDU
Hamburg	List		Erik Blumenfeld	CDU
Hamburg	List		Carl Damm	CDU
Hamburg	List		Heinrich Gewandt	CDU
Hamburg	List		Gerhard Orgaß	CDU
Hamburg	List		Dietrich Rollmann	CDU
Hamburg	List		Klaus Schmid-Burgk	CDU
Hamburg	List		Helmut Schmidt	SPD
Hamburg	List		Claus Arndt (Note: Claus Arndt took office on 4 June 1968, to succeed Peter Blachstein.)	SPD
Hamburg	List		Rolf Dahlgrün	FDP
Lower Saxony	20	Emden – Leer	Georg Peters	SPD
Lower Saxony	21	Wilhelmshaven	Felix von Eckardt	CDU
Lower Saxony	22	Oldenburg	Heinz Frieler	CDU
Lower Saxony	23	Delmenhorst – Wesermarsch	J. Hermann Siemer	CDU
Lower Saxony	24	Cuxhaven	Heinrich Schröder	CDU
Lower Saxony	25	Stade	Peter Tobaben	CDU
Lower Saxony	26	Emsland	Josef Stecker	CDU
Lower Saxony	27	Cloppenburg	Kurt Schmücker	CDU
Lower Saxony	28	Hoya	Artur Missbach	CDU
Lower Saxony	29	Verden	Hans-Joachim von Merkatz	CDU
Lower Saxony	30	Soltau – Harburg	Hans-Christoph Seebohm (Note: Hans-Christoph Seebohm died on 17 September 1967.)	CDU
Lower Saxony	31	Lüneburg – Lüchow-Dannenberg	Lambert Huys	CDU
Lower Saxony	32	Bersenbrück	Burkhard Ritz	CDU
Lower Saxony	33	Osnabrück	Ferdinand Erpenbeck	CDU
Lower Saxony	34	Nienburg	Günter von Nordenskjöld	CDU
Lower Saxony	35	Schaumburg	Friedrich Blume	SPD
Lower Saxony	36	Hannover I	Egon Franke	SPD
Lower Saxony	37	Hannover II	Helmut Rohde	SPD
Lower Saxony	38	Hannover III	Werner Marquardt	SPD
Lower Saxony	39	Celle	Wilhelm Brese	CDU
Lower Saxony	40	Gifhorn	Arthur Enk	CDU
Lower Saxony	41	Hameln – Springe	Heinz Frehsee	SPD
Lower Saxony	42	Holzminden	Elinor Hubert	SPD
Lower Saxony	43	Hildesheim	Friedrich Kühn	CDU
Lower Saxony	44	Salzgitter	Hans-Jürgen Junghans	SPD
Lower Saxony	45	Braunschweig	Walter Schmidt	SPD
Lower Saxony	46	Helmstedt – Wolfsburg	Alfred Burgemeister	CDU
Lower Saxony	47	Goslar – Wolfenbüttel	Edelhard Rock	CDU
Lower Saxony	48	Northeim	Martin Schmidt	SPD
Lower Saxony	49	Göttingen	Willy Steinmetz	CDU
Lower Saxony	List		Hermann Ahrens	SPD/GDP
Lower Saxony	List		Johann Cramer	SPD
Lower Saxony	List		Günter Frede (Note: Günter Frede died on 23 November 1967.)	SPD
Lower Saxony	List		Horst Gerlach	SPD
Lower Saxony	List		Rudolf Hauck	SPD
Lower Saxony	List		Hans Hermsdorf	SPD
Lower Saxony	List		Hans Ils	SPD
Lower Saxony	List		Lisa Korspeter	SPD
Lower Saxony	List		Werner Kunze	SPD
Lower Saxony	List		Rudi Lotze	SPD
Lower Saxony	List		Heinz Morgenstern (Note: Heinz Morgenstern resigned on 14 September 1966.)	SPD
Lower Saxony	List		Paul Neumann	SPD
Lower Saxony	List		Joachim Raffert	SPD
Lower Saxony	List		Karl Ravens	SPD
Lower Saxony	List		Helmut Schlüter (Note: Helmut Schlüter died on 7 April 1967.)	SPD
Lower Saxony	List		Willi Wolf	SPD
Lower Saxony	List		Kurt Ross (Note: Kurt Ross took office on 21 September 1966, to succeed Heinz Morgenstern.)	SPD
Lower Saxony	List		Hermann Barche (Note: Hermann Barche took office on 14 April 1967, to succeed Helmut Schlüter.)	SPD
Lower Saxony	List		Hans Lemp (Note: Hans Lemp took office on 29 November 1967, to succeed Günter Frede.)	SPD
Lower Saxony	List		Hermann Conring	CDU
Lower Saxony	List		Alexander Elbrächter	CDU
Lower Saxony	List		Heinrich Franke	CDU
Lower Saxony	List		Hans Edgar Jahn	CDU
Lower Saxony	List		Gerhard Jungmann	CDU
Lower Saxony	List		Margot Kalinke	CDU
Lower Saxony	List		Heinrich Krone	CDU
Lower Saxony	List		Ernst Kuntscher	CDU
Lower Saxony	List		Franz Varelmann	CDU
Lower Saxony	List		Heinrich Lindenberg (Note: Heinrich Lindenberg took office on 29 September 1967, to succeed Hans-Christoph Seebohm.)	CDU
Lower Saxony	List		Carlo Graaff	FDP
Lower Saxony	List		Walther Hellige	FDP
Lower Saxony	List		Fritz Logemann	FDP
Lower Saxony	List		Herwart Miessner	FDP
Lower Saxony	List		Bernhard Mühlhan	FDP
Lower Saxony	List		Heinrich Sander	FDP
Lower Saxony	List		Gerold Wächter	FDP
Bremen	50	Bremen-Ost	Hermann Hansing	SPD
Bremen	51	Bremen-West	Hans Stefan Seifriz	SPD
Bremen	52	Bremerhaven – Bremen-Nord	Harry Tallert	SPD
Bremen	List		Karl Krammig	CDU
Bremen	List		Ernst Müller-Hermann	CDU
North Rhine-Westphalia	53	Aachen-Stadt	Edmund Sinn	CDU
North Rhine-Westphalia	54	Aachen-Land	Josef Müller	CDU
North Rhine-Westphalia	55	Geilenkirchen – Heinsberg	Fritz Burgbacher	CDU
North Rhine-Westphalia	56	Düren	Bert Even	CDU
North Rhine-Westphalia	57	Bergheim (Erft)	Hans Verbeek (Note: Hans Verbeek died on 13 December 1966.)	CDU
North Rhine-Westphalia	58	Köln-Land	Aloys Lenz	CDU
North Rhine-Westphalia	59	Cologne I	Hans-Jürgen Wischnewski	SPD
North Rhine-Westphalia	60	Cologne II	Carl Hesberg	CDU
North Rhine-Westphalia	61	Cologne III	Aenne Brauksiepe	CDU
North Rhine-Westphalia	62	Cologne IV	Heinrich Hamacher	SPD
North Rhine-Westphalia	63	Bonn	Konrad Adenauer (Note: Konrad Adenauer died on 19 April 1967.)	CDU
North Rhine-Westphalia	64	Siegkreis I – Bonn-Land	Georg Kliesing	CDU
North Rhine-Westphalia	65	Oberbergischer Kreis – Siegkreis II	Gustav Stein	CDU
North Rhine-Westphalia	66	Rheinisch-Bergischer Kreis	Paul Lücke	CDU
North Rhine-Westphalia	67	Leverkusen – Opladen	Bruno Wiefel	SPD
North Rhine-Westphalia	68	Remscheid	Peter Wilhelm Brand	CDU
North Rhine-Westphalia	69	Wuppertal I	Hermann Herberts	SPD
North Rhine-Westphalia	70	Wuppertal II	Kurt Matthes	SPD
North Rhine-Westphalia	71	Solingen	Arthur Killat	SPD
North Rhine-Westphalia	72	Düsseldorf-Mettmann I	Willi Müser	CDU
North Rhine-Westphalia	73	Düsseldorf-Mettmann II	Gerhard Schröder	CDU
North Rhine-Westphalia	74	Düsseldorf I	Gottfried Arnold	CDU
North Rhine-Westphalia	75	Düsseldorf II	Helmut Lenders	SPD
North Rhine-Westphalia	76	Düsseldorf III	Georg Schulhoff	CDU
North Rhine-Westphalia	77	Neuss – Grevenbroich I	Josef Rommerskirchen	CDU
North Rhine-Westphalia	78	Rheydt – Grevenbroich II	Alphons Horten	CDU
North Rhine-Westphalia	79	Mönchengladbach	Joseph Illerhaus	CDU
North Rhine-Westphalia	80	Krefeld	Günther Serres	CDU
North Rhine-Westphalia	81	Kempen-Krefeld	Hugo Hammans	CDU
North Rhine-Westphalia	82	Moers	Fritz Büttner	SPD
North Rhine-Westphalia	83	Kleve	Felix Freiherr von Vittinghoff-Schell	CDU
North Rhine-Westphalia	84	Dinslaken	Konrad Kraske	CDU
North Rhine-Westphalia	85	Oberhausen	Luise Albertz	SPD
North Rhine-Westphalia	86	Mülheim	Willi Müller	SPD
North Rhine-Westphalia	87	Essen I	Erwin Lange	SPD
North Rhine-Westphalia	88	Essen II	Karl Bergmann	SPD
North Rhine-Westphalia	89	Essen III	Hans Toussaint	CDU
North Rhine-Westphalia	90	Duisburg I	Eberhard Brünen	SPD
North Rhine-Westphalia	91	Duisburg II	Hermann Spillecke	SPD
North Rhine-Westphalia	92	Ahaus – Bocholt	Theodor Blank	CDU
North Rhine-Westphalia	93	Tecklenburg	Wilhelm Rawe	CDU
North Rhine-Westphalia	94	Beckum – Warendorf	Heinrich Windelen	CDU
North Rhine-Westphalia	95	Münster	Hermann Diebäcker	CDU
North Rhine-Westphalia	96	Steinfurt – Coesfeld	Heinrich Hörnemann	CDU
North Rhine-Westphalia	97	Gelsenkirchen I	Josef Löbbert	SPD
North Rhine-Westphalia	98	Gelsenkirchen II	Hans Gertzen	SPD
North Rhine-Westphalia	99	Recklinghausen-Land	Günther Eckerland	SPD
North Rhine-Westphalia	100	Recklinghausen-Stadt	Heinrich Auge	SPD
North Rhine-Westphalia	101	Bottrop – Gladbeck	Johann Wuwer	SPD
North Rhine-Westphalia	102	Höxter	Heinrich Wilper (Note: Heinrich Wilper died on 3 March 1967.)	CDU
North Rhine-Westphalia	103	Bielefeld-Land	Heinrich Junker	SPD
North Rhine-Westphalia	104	Bielefeld-Stadt	Gerhard Koch	SPD
North Rhine-Westphalia	105	Detmold – Lippe	August Berlin	SPD
North Rhine-Westphalia	106	Paderborn – Wiedenbrück	Rainer Barzel	CDU
North Rhine-Westphalia	107	Herford	Günter Biermann	SPD
North Rhine-Westphalia	108	Minden	Friedrich Schonhofen	SPD
North Rhine-Westphalia	109	Lüdinghausen	Günter Rinsche	CDU
North Rhine-Westphalia	110	Wanne-Eickel – Wattenscheid	Heinz Westphal	SPD
North Rhine-Westphalia	111	Herne – Castrop-Rauxel	Herbert Kriedemann	SPD
North Rhine-Westphalia	112	Ennepe-Ruhr-Kreis	Wilhelm Michels	SPD
North Rhine-Westphalia	113	Hagen	Fritz Steinhoff	SPD
North Rhine-Westphalia	114	Dortmund I	Heinrich Stephan	SPD
North Rhine-Westphalia	115	Dortmund II	Willi Beuster	SPD
North Rhine-Westphalia	116	Dortmund III	Walter Behrendt	SPD
North Rhine-Westphalia	117	Bochum	Karl Liedtke	SPD
North Rhine-Westphalia	118	Bochum – Witten	Gustav Heinemann (Note: Gustav Heinemann resigned on 24 June 1969.)	SPD
North Rhine-Westphalia	119	Iserlohn	Theodor Mengelkamp (Note: Theodor Mengelkamp died on 21 July 1967.)	CDU
North Rhine-Westphalia	120	Lippstadt – Brilon	Bernhard Balkenhol	CDU
North Rhine-Westphalia	121	Olpe – Meschede	Franz Lenze	CDU
North Rhine-Westphalia	122	Arnsberg – Soest	Ernst Majonica	CDU
North Rhine-Westphalia	123	Unna	Manfred Schulte	SPD
North Rhine-Westphalia	124	Altena – Lüdenscheid	Erwin Welke	SPD
North Rhine-Westphalia	125	Siegen – Wittgenstein	Botho Prinz zu Sayn-Wittgenstein-Hohenstein	CDU
North Rhine-Westphalia	List		Ulrich Berger	CDU
North Rhine-Westphalia	List		Karl Bewerunge	CDU
North Rhine-Westphalia	List		Kurt Birrenbach	CDU
North Rhine-Westphalia	List		Valentin Brück	CDU
North Rhine-Westphalia	List		Heinz Budde	CDU
North Rhine-Westphalia	List		Rembert van Delden	CDU
North Rhine-Westphalia	List		Hans Dichgans	CDU
North Rhine-Westphalia	List		Karl-Heinz Exner	CDU
North Rhine-Westphalia	List		Göke Frerichs	CDU
North Rhine-Westphalia	List		Martin Frey	CDU
North Rhine-Westphalia	List		Karl Hahn	CDU
North Rhine-Westphalia	List		Alo Hauser	CDU
North Rhine-Westphalia	List		Martin Horstmeier	CDU
North Rhine-Westphalia	List		Maria Jacobi	CDU
North Rhine-Westphalia	List		Hans Katzer	CDU
North Rhine-Westphalia	List		Heinrich Köppler	CDU
North Rhine-Westphalia	List		Egon Lampersbach	CDU
North Rhine-Westphalia	List		Manfred Luda	CDU
North Rhine-Westphalia	List		Hans Meis	CDU
North Rhine-Westphalia	List		Josef Mick	CDU
North Rhine-Westphalia	List		Adolf Müller	CDU
North Rhine-Westphalia	List		Gerhard Philipp (Note: Gerhard Philipp died on 20 April 1966.)	CDU
North Rhine-Westphalia	List		Josef Porten	CDU
North Rhine-Westphalia	List		Gerd Ritgen	CDU
North Rhine-Westphalia	List		Josef Rösing	CDU
North Rhine-Westphalia	List		Hermann Josef Russe	CDU
North Rhine-Westphalia	List		Otto Schmidt	CDU
North Rhine-Westphalia	List		Kurt Schober	CDU
North Rhine-Westphalia	List		Christa Schroeder	CDU
North Rhine-Westphalia	List		Gerd Springorum	CDU
North Rhine-Westphalia	List		Maria Stommel	CDU
North Rhine-Westphalia	List		Theodor Teriete	CDU
North Rhine-Westphalia	List		Friedrich Vogel (Note: Friedrich Vogel resigned on 6 October 1966.)	CDU
North Rhine-Westphalia	List		Bernhard Winkelheide	CDU
North Rhine-Westphalia	List		Erika Wolf	CDU
North Rhine-Westphalia	List		Heinrich Wullenhaupt	CDU
North Rhine-Westphalia	List		Elisabeth Enseling (Note: Elisabeth Enseling took office on 28 April 1966, to succeed Gerhard Philipp.)	CDU
North Rhine-Westphalia	List		Wilhelm Krampe (Note: Wilhelm Krampe took office on 11 October 1966, to succeed Friedrich Vogel.)	CDU
North Rhine-Westphalia	List		Erich Weiland (Note: Erich Weiland took office on 14 December 1966, to succeed Hans Verbeek.)	CDU
North Rhine-Westphalia	List		Leo Ernesti (Note: Leo Ernesti took office on 9 March 1967, to succeed Heinrich Wilper.)	CDU
North Rhine-Westphalia	List		Helga Wex (Note: Helga Wex took office on 28 April 1967, to succeed Konrad Adenauer.)	CDU
North Rhine-Westphalia	List		Franz Falke (Note: Franz Falke took office on 27 July 1967, to succeed Theodor Mengelkamp.)	CDU
North Rhine-Westphalia	List		Walter Arendt	SPD
North Rhine-Westphalia	List		Adolf Arndt	SPD
North Rhine-Westphalia	List		Hermann Buschfort	SPD
North Rhine-Westphalia	List		Elfriede Eilers	SPD
North Rhine-Westphalia	List		Fritz Eschmann	SPD
North Rhine-Westphalia	List		Werner Figgen (Note: Werner Figgen resigned on 6 December 1966.)	SPD
North Rhine-Westphalia	List		Udo Hein (Note: Udo Hein resigned on 22 December 1966.)	SPD
North Rhine-Westphalia	List		Josef Hellenbrock	SPD
North Rhine-Westphalia	List		Josef Hufnagel	SPD
North Rhine-Westphalia	List		Hans Iven	SPD
North Rhine-Westphalia	List		Werner Jacobi	SPD
North Rhine-Westphalia	List		Wenzel Jaksch (Note: Wenzel Jaksch died on 27 November 1966.)	SPD
North Rhine-Westphalia	List		Günter Jaschke	SPD
North Rhine-Westphalia	List		Jakob Koenen	SPD
North Rhine-Westphalia	List		Willy Könen	SPD
North Rhine-Westphalia	List		Hubert Lemper	SPD
North Rhine-Westphalia	List		Ulrich Lohmar	SPD
North Rhine-Westphalia	List		Wilhelm Maibaum	SPD
North Rhine-Westphalia	List		Georg Neemann	SPD
North Rhine-Westphalia	List		Peter Nellen	SPD
North Rhine-Westphalia	List		Heinz Pöhler	SPD
North Rhine-Westphalia	List		Margarete Rudoll	SPD
North Rhine-Westphalia	List		Karl-Heinz Saxowski	SPD
North Rhine-Westphalia	List		Hildegard Schimschok	SPD
North Rhine-Westphalia	List		Hermann Schmidt	SPD
North Rhine-Westphalia	List		Albert Tönjes	SPD
North Rhine-Westphalia	List		Franz Vit	SPD
North Rhine-Westphalia	List		Heinrich Welslau	SPD
North Rhine-Westphalia	List		Martin Wendt	SPD
North Rhine-Westphalia	List		Helene Wessel (Note: Helene Wessel died on 13 October 1969.)	SPD
North Rhine-Westphalia	List		Karl Wienand	SPD
North Rhine-Westphalia	List		Klaus Hübner (Note: Klaus Hübner took office on 6 December 1966, to succeed Wenzel Jaksch, but later resigned on 14 January 1969.)	SPD
North Rhine-Westphalia	List		Rudi Adams (Note: Rudi Adams took office on 8 December 1966, to succeed Werner Figgen.)	SPD
North Rhine-Westphalia	List		Adolf Feuring (Note: Adolf Feuring took office on 2 January 1967, to succeed Udo Hein.)	SPD
North Rhine-Westphalia	List		Helmut Esters (Note: Helmut Esters took office on 15 January 1969, to succeed Klaus Hübner.)	SPD
North Rhine-Westphalia	List		Hermann Dortans (Note: Hermann Dortans took office on 30 June 1969, to succeed Gustav Heinemann.)	SPD
North Rhine-Westphalia	List		Ernst Achenbach	FDP
North Rhine-Westphalia	List		Hermann Busse	FDP
North Rhine-Westphalia	List		Wolfram Dorn	FDP
North Rhine-Westphalia	List		Josef Effertz (Note: Josef Effertz resigned on 4 March 1968.)	FDP
North Rhine-Westphalia	List		Hans Georg Emde	FDP
North Rhine-Westphalia	List		Liselotte Funcke	FDP
North Rhine-Westphalia	List		Hans-Dietrich Genscher	FDP
North Rhine-Westphalia	List		Erich Mende	FDP
North Rhine-Westphalia	List		Alfred Ollesch	FDP
North Rhine-Westphalia	List		Rudolf Opitz	FDP
North Rhine-Westphalia	List		Egon Wilhelm Ramms	FDP
North Rhine-Westphalia	List		Walter Scheel	FDP
North Rhine-Westphalia	List		Siegfried Zoglmann	FDP
North Rhine-Westphalia	List		Hedda Heuser (Note: Hedda Heuser took office on 11 March 1968, to succeed Josef Effertz.)	FDP
Hesse	126	Waldeck	Karl Bechert	SPD
Hesse	127	Kassel	Holger Börner	SPD
Hesse	128	Eschwege	Egon Höhmann	SPD
Hesse	129	Fritzlar-Homberg	Harri Bading	SPD
Hesse	130	Hersfeld	Edwin Zerbe (Note: Edwin Zerbe resigned on 2 May 1967.)	SPD
Hesse	131	Marburg	Ludwig Preiß	CDU
Hesse	132	Wetzlar	Wilhelm Reitz	SPD
Hesse	133	Gießen	Hans Merten (Note: Hans Merten died on 12 December 1967.)	SPD
Hesse	134	Fulda	Hermann Götz	CDU
Hesse	135	Obertaunuskreis	Walther Leisler Kiep	CDU
Hesse	136	Friedberg	Lucie Kurlbaum-Beyer	SPD
Hesse	137	Limburg	Benno Erhard	CDU
Hesse	138	Wiesbaden	Karl-Walter Fritz	SPD
Hesse	139	Hanau	Gerhard Flämig	SPD
Hesse	140	Frankfurt I	Georg Leber	SPD
Hesse	141	Frankfurt II	Brigitte Freyh	SPD
Hesse	142	Frankfurt III	Hans Matthöfer	SPD
Hesse	143	Groß-Gerau	Hermann Schmitt-Vockenhausen	SPD
Hesse	144	Offenbach	Horst Schmidt	SPD
Hesse	145	Darmstadt	Ludwig Metzger	SPD
Hesse	146	Dieburg	Willi Bäuerle	SPD
Hesse	147	Bergstraße	Carl Otto Lenz	CDU
Hesse	List		Friedrich Freiwald	CDU
Hesse	List		Lothar Haase	CDU
Hesse	List		Walter Löhr	CDU
Hesse	List		Berthold Martin	CDU
Hesse	List		Walter Picard	CDU
Hesse	List		Elisabeth Pitz-Savelsberg	CDU
Hesse	List		Carl Reinhard	CDU
Hesse	List		Clemens Riedel	CDU
Hesse	List		Elisabeth Schwarzhaupt	CDU
Hesse	List		Hermann Stahlberg	CDU
Hesse	List		August Weimer	CDU
Hesse	List		Hans Wilhelmi	CDU
Hesse	List		Otto Zink	CDU
Hesse	List		Knut von Kühlmann-Stumm	FDP
Hesse	List		Alexander Menne	FDP
Hesse	List		Wolfgang Mischnick	FDP
Hesse	List		Hans-Werner Staratzke	FDP
Hesse	List		Fritz Walter	FDP
Hesse	List		Richard Wurbs	FDP
Hesse	List		Kurt Gscheidle	SPD
Hesse	List		Gerhard Jahn	SPD
Hesse	List		Heinz Kreutzmann	SPD/GDP
Hesse	List		Wolfgang Schwabe	SPD
Hesse	List		Wendelin Enders (Note: Wendelin Enders took office on 9 May 1967, to succeed Edwin Zerbe.)	SPD
Hesse	List		Ingeborg Kleinert (Note: Ingeborg Kleinert took office on 14 December 1967, to succeed Hans Merten.)	SPD
Rhineland-Palatinate	148	Neuwied	Franz-Josef Wuermeling	CDU
Rhineland-Palatinate	149	Ahrweiler	Johann Peter Josten	CDU
Rhineland-Palatinate	150	Koblenz	Egon Klepsch	CDU
Rhineland-Palatinate	151	Cochem	Paul Gibbert (Note: Paul Gibbert died on 30 December 1967.)	CDU
Rhineland-Palatinate	152	Kreuznach	Wilhelm Dröscher	SPD
Rhineland-Palatinate	153	Bitburg	Hans Richarts (Note: Hans Richarts resigned on 16 September 1969.)	CDU
Rhineland-Palatinate	154	Trier	Heinrich Holkenbrink (Note: Heinrich Holkenbrink resigned on 17 July 1967.)	CDU
Rhineland-Palatinate	155	Montabaur	August Hanz	CDU
Rhineland-Palatinate	156	Mainz	Josef Hofmann	CDU
Rhineland-Palatinate	157	Worms	Willy Müller	SPD
Rhineland-Palatinate	158	Frankenthal	Rudolf Kaffka	SPD
Rhineland-Palatinate	159	Ludwigshafen	Hans Bardens	SPD
Rhineland-Palatinate	160	Neustadt – Speyer	Bernhard Vogel (Note: Bernhard Vogel resigned on 17 July 1967.)	CDU
Rhineland-Palatinate	161	Kaiserslautern	Adolf Müller-Emmert	SPD
Rhineland-Palatinate	162	Pirmasens	Josef Becker	CDU
Rhineland-Palatinate	163	Landau	Albert Leicht	CDU
Rhineland-Palatinate	List		Werner Buchstaller	SPD
Rhineland-Palatinate	List		Hugo Collet	SPD
Rhineland-Palatinate	List		Karl Haehser	SPD
Rhineland-Palatinate	List		Luise Herklotz	SPD
Rhineland-Palatinate	List		Max Seither	SPD
Rhineland-Palatinate	List		Elfriede Seppi	SPD
Rhineland-Palatinate	List		Franz Stein (Note: Franz Stein died on 14 September 1967.)	SPD
Rhineland-Palatinate	List		Willi Peiter (Note: Willi Peiter took office on 19 September 1967, to succeed Franz Stein.)	SPD
Rhineland-Palatinate	List		Jakob Franzen	CDU
Rhineland-Palatinate	List		Udo Giulini	CDU
Rhineland-Palatinate	List		Marie-Elisabeth Klee	CDU
Rhineland-Palatinate	List		Werner Marx	CDU
Rhineland-Palatinate	List		Adolf Süsterhenn	CDU
Rhineland-Palatinate	List		Ludwig Knobloch (Note: Ludwig Knobloch took office on 24 July 1967, to succeed Bernhard Vogel.)	CDU
Rhineland-Palatinate	List		Hermann Reinholz (Note: Hermann Reinholz took office on 24 July 1967, to succeed Heinrich Holkenbrink, but later died on 7 October 1967.)	CDU
Rhineland-Palatinate	List		Anna Mönikes (Note: Anna Mönikes took office on 12 October 1967, to succeed Hermann Reinholz.)	CDU
Rhineland-Palatinate	List		Lieselotte Holzmeister (Note: Lieselotte Holzmeister took office on 5 February 1968, to succeed Paul Gibbert.)	CDU
Rhineland-Palatinate	List		Johannes Baptist Rösler (Note: Johannes Baptist Rösler took office on 24 September 1969, to succeed Hans Richarts.)	CDU
Rhineland-Palatinate	List		Hans Friderichs	FDP
Rhineland-Palatinate	List		Ludwig Hamm (Note: Ludwig Hamm resigned on 12 May 1956.)	FDP
Rhineland-Palatinate	List		Fritz-Rudolf Schultz	FDP
Rhineland-Palatinate	List		Kurt Jung (Note: Kurt Jung took office on 17 May 1966, to succeed Ludwig Hamm.)	FDP
Baden-Württemberg	164	Stuttgart I	Erwin Schoettle	SPD
Baden-Württemberg	165	Stuttgart II	Ernst Haar	SPD
Baden-Württemberg	166	Stuttgart III	Arved Deringer	CDU
Baden-Württemberg	167	Ludwigsburg	Karl Mommer	SPD
Baden-Württemberg	168	Heilbronn	Helmut Bazille	SPD
Baden-Württemberg	169	Leonberg – Vaihingen	Peter Petersen	CDU
Baden-Württemberg	170	Nürtingen – Böblingen	Anton Stark	CDU
Baden-Württemberg	171	Eßlingen	Thomas Ruf	CDU
Baden-Württemberg	172	Göppingen	Manfred Wörner	CDU
Baden-Württemberg	173	Ulm	Ludwig Erhard	CDU
Baden-Württemberg	174	Aalen – Heidenheim	Manfred Abelein	CDU
Baden-Württemberg	175	Schwäbisch Gmünd – Backnang	Eugen Gerstenmaier	CDU
Baden-Württemberg	176	Crailsheim	Heinrich Stooß	CDU
Baden-Württemberg	177	Waiblingen	Friedrich Fritz	CDU
Baden-Württemberg	178	Karlsruhe	Max Güde	CDU
Baden-Württemberg	179	Mannheim I	Carlo Schmid	SPD
Baden-Württemberg	180	Mannheim II	Paul Kübler (Note: Paul Kübler died on 9 August 1969.)	SPD
Baden-Württemberg	181	Heidelberg-Stadt	Eduard Wahl	CDU
Baden-Württemberg	182	Pforzheim – Karlsruhe-Land I	Siegfried Meister	CDU
Baden-Württemberg	183	Bruchsal – Karlsruhe-Land II	Helmut Artzinger	CDU
Baden-Württemberg	184	Heidelberg-Land – Sinsheim	Fritz Baier	CDU
Baden-Württemberg	185	Tauberbischofsheim	August Berberich	CDU
Baden-Württemberg	186	Konstanz	Hermann Biechele	CDU
Baden-Württemberg	187	Donaueschingen	Hansjörg Häfele	CDU
Baden-Württemberg	188	Waldshut	Anton Hilbert	CDU
Baden-Württemberg	189	Lörrach – Müllheim	Karl August Bühler	CDU
Baden-Württemberg	190	Freiburg	Hermann Kopf	CDU
Baden-Württemberg	191	Emmendingen – Wolfach	Albert Burger	CDU
Baden-Württemberg	192	Offenburg	Hans Furler	CDU
Baden-Württemberg	193	Rastatt	Hugo Hauser	CDU
Baden-Württemberg	194	Reutlingen	Heiner Geißler (Note: Heiner Geißler resigned on 11 October 1967.)	CDU
Baden-Württemberg	195	Calw	Helmut Prassler	CDU
Baden-Württemberg	196	Rottweil	Bruno Heck	CDU
Baden-Württemberg	197	Balingen	Hermann Schwörer	CDU
Baden-Württemberg	198	Biberach	Bernhard Bauknecht	CDU
Baden-Württemberg	199	Ravensburg	Eduard Adorno	CDU
Baden-Württemberg	List		Fritz Corterier	SPD
Baden-Württemberg	List		Erhard Eppler	SPD
Baden-Württemberg	List		Fritz Erler (Note: Fritz Erler died on 22 February 1967.)	SPD
Baden-Württemberg	List		Walter Faller	SPD
Baden-Württemberg	List		Hans Geiger	SPD
Baden-Württemberg	List		Hans Hörmann	SPD
Baden-Württemberg	List		Ursula Krips (Note: Ursula Krips resigned on 31 January 1969.)	SPD
Baden-Württemberg	List		Hedwig Meermann	SPD
Baden-Württemberg	List		Alex Möller	SPD
Baden-Württemberg	List		Karl Müller	SPD
Baden-Württemberg	List		Ernst Paul	SPD
Baden-Württemberg	List		Friedrich Rau	SPD
Baden-Württemberg	List		Klaus Richter	SPD
Baden-Württemberg	List		Karl Riegel	SPD
Baden-Württemberg	List		Fritz Rinderspacher	SPD
Baden-Württemberg	List		Friedrich Schäfer (Note: Friedrich Schäfer resigned on 14 February 1967.)	SPD
Baden-Württemberg	List		Marta Schanzenbach	SPD
Baden-Württemberg	List		Ernst Hölzle (Note: Ernst Hölzle took office on 20 February 1967, to succeed Friedrich Schäfer.)	SPD
Baden-Württemberg	List		Karl-Hans Kern (Note: Karl-Hans Kern took office on 27 February 1967, to succeed Fritz Erler.)	SPD
Baden-Württemberg	List		Alfred Nann (Note: Alfred Nann took office on 17 February 1969, to succeed Ursula Krips.)	SPD
Baden-Württemberg	List		Friedrich Karius (Note: Friedrich Karius took office on 18 August 1969, to succeed Paul Kübler.)	SPD
Baden-Württemberg	List		Ewald Bucher	FDP
Baden-Württemberg	List		Emmy Diemer-Nicolaus	FDP
Baden-Württemberg	List		Hans Lenz (Note: Hans Lenz resigned on 5 October 1967.)	FDP
Baden-Württemberg	List		Adolf Mauk	FDP
Baden-Württemberg	List		Werner Mertes	FDP
Baden-Württemberg	List		Karl Moersch	FDP
Baden-Württemberg	List		Martin Reichmann	FDP
Baden-Württemberg	List		Wolfgang Rutschke	FDP
Baden-Württemberg	List		Hermann Saam	FDP
Baden-Württemberg	List		Kurt Spitzmüller	FDP
Baden-Württemberg	List		Gustav Freiherr von Gemmingen-Hornberg (Note: Gustav Freiherr von Gemmingen-Hornberg took office on 11 October 1967, to succeed Hans Lenz.)	FDP
Baden-Württemberg	List		Fritz Berendsen	CDU
Baden-Württemberg	List		Herbert Czaja	CDU
Baden-Württemberg	List		Annemarie Griesinger	CDU
Baden-Württemberg	List		Erwin Häussler	CDU
Baden-Württemberg	List		Eugen Maucher	CDU
Baden-Württemberg	List		Kurt Härzschel (Note: Kurt Härzschel took office on 19 October 1967, to succeed Heiner Geißler.)	CDU
Bavaria	200	Altötting	Josef Bauer	CSU
Bavaria	201	Fürstenfeldbruck	Richard Jaeger	CSU
Bavaria	202	Ingolstadt	Karl Heinz Gierenstein	CSU
Bavaria	203	Miesbach	Franz Gleissner	CSU
Bavaria	204	Munich Centre	Konstantin Prinz von Bayern (Note: Konstantin Prinz von Bayern died on 30 July 1969.)	CSU
Bavaria	205	Munich North	Walter Seuffert (Note: Walter Seuffert resigned on 18 October 1967.)	SPD
Bavaria	206	Munich East	Franz Marx	SPD
Bavaria	207	Munich South	Günther Müller	SPD
Bavaria	208	Munich West	Erwin Folger	SPD
Bavaria	209	Munich Land	Anton Besold	CSU
Bavaria	210	Rosenheim	Ludwig Franz	CSU
Bavaria	211	Traunstein	Heinz Brenck	CSU
Bavaria	212	Weilheim	Franz Josef Strauss	CSU
Bavaria	213	Deggendorf	Stefan Dittrich	CSU
Bavaria	214	Landshut	Friedrich Zimmermann (Note: Friedrich Zimmermann resigned on 15 October 1969.)	CSU
Bavaria	215	Passau	Franz Xaver Unertl	CSU
Bavaria	216	Straubing	Alois Rainer	CSU
Bavaria	217	Pfarrkirchen	Friedrich Kempfler	CSU
Bavaria	218	Amberg – Neumarkt	Heinrich Aigner	CSU
Bavaria	219	Burglengenfeld	Alois Niederalt	CSU
Bavaria	220	Regensburg	Hermann Höcherl	CSU
Bavaria	221	Tirschenreuth	Franz Weigl	CSU
Bavaria	222	Bamberg	Paul Röhner	CSU
Bavaria	223	Bayreuth	Albrecht Schlee	CSU
Bavaria	224	Coburg	Karl Hofmann	SPD
Bavaria	225	Hof	Martin Hirsch	SPD
Bavaria	226	Kulmbach	Karl Theodor Freiherr von und zu Guttenberg	CSU
Bavaria	227	Ansbach	Georg Ehnes	CSU
Bavaria	228	Erlangen	Adalbert Hudak	CSU
Bavaria	229	Fürth	Werner Dollinger	CSU
Bavaria	230	Nuremberg North	Georg Kurlbaum	SPD
Bavaria	231	Nuremberg South	Käte Strobel	SPD
Bavaria	232	Weißenburg	Richard Stücklen	CSU
Bavaria	233	Aschaffenburg	Karl-Heinz Vogt	CSU
Bavaria	234	Bad Kissingen	Alex Hösl	CSU
Bavaria	235	Karlstadt	Maria Probst (Note: Maria Probst died on 1 May 1967.)	CSU
Bavaria	236	Schweinfurt	Max Schulze-Vorberg	CSU
Bavaria	237	Würzburg	Linus Memmel	CSU
Bavaria	238	Augsburg	Anton Ott	CSU
Bavaria	239	Augsburg-Land	Walter Althammer	CSU
Bavaria	240	Donauwörth	Karl Heinz Lemmrich	CSU
Bavaria	241	Neu-Ulm	Leo Wagner	CSU
Bavaria	242	Kaufbeuren	Hans August Lücker	CSU
Bavaria	243	Kempten	Georg Krug	CSU
Bavaria	List		Hans Bals	SPD
Bavaria	List		Hannsheinz Bauer	SPD
Bavaria	List		Fritz Böhm	SPD
Bavaria	List		Josef Felder	SPD
Bavaria	List		Ludwig Fellermaier	SPD
Bavaria	List		Walter Fritsch	SPD
Bavaria	List		Hermann Haage	SPD
Bavaria	List		Herbert Hauffe	SPD
Bavaria	List		Karl Herold	SPD
Bavaria	List		Franz Höhne	SPD
Bavaria	List		Fritz Wilhelm Hörauf	SPD
Bavaria	List		Georg Kahn-Ackermann	SPD
Bavaria	List		Richard Kohlberger	SPD
Bavaria	List		Walter Langebeck	SPD
Bavaria	List		Hans Lautenschlager	SPD
Bavaria	List		Konrad Porzner	SPD
Bavaria	List		Gerhard Reischl	SPD
Bavaria	List		Philipp Seibert	SPD
Bavaria	List		Max Seidel	SPD
Bavaria	List		Wolfgang Stammberger	SPD
Bavaria	List		Alois Strohmayr	SPD
Bavaria	List		Franz Josef Zebisch	SPD
Bavaria	List		Alfons Bayerl (Note: Alfons Bayerl took office on 27 October 1967, to succeed Walter Seuffert.)	SPD
Bavaria	List		Siegfried Balke	CSU
Bavaria	List		Walter Becher	CSU/GDP
Bavaria	List		Walter Eckhardt	CSU
Bavaria	List		Ingeborg Geisendörfer	CSU
Bavaria	List		Edeltraud Kuchtner	CSU
Bavaria	List		Edmund Leukert	CSU
Bavaria	List		Wolfgang Pohle	CSU
Bavaria	List		Herbert Prochazka	CSU/GDP
Bavaria	List		Manfred Schlager	CSU
Bavaria	List		Peter Schmidhuber	CSU
Bavaria	List		Georg Stiller	CSU
Bavaria	List		Karl Wieninger	CSU
Bavaria	List		Erich Ziegler	CSU
Bavaria	List		Franz Xaver Geisenhofer (Note: Franz Xaver Geisenhofer took office on 3 May 1967, to succeed Maria Probst.)	CSU
Bavaria	List		Josef Spies (Note: Josef Spies took office on 4 August 1969, to succeed Konstantin Prinz von Bayern.)	CSU
Bavaria	List		Thomas Dehler (Note: Thomas Dehler died on 21 July 1967.)	FDP
Bavaria	List		Josef Ertl	FDP
Bavaria	List		Karl Geldner	FDP
Bavaria	List		Albrecht Haas	FDP
Bavaria	List		Werner Kubitza	FDP
Bavaria	List		Hansheinrich Schmidt	FDP
Bavaria	List		Heinz Starke	FDP
Bavaria	List		Werner Porsch (Note: Werner Porsch took office on 27 July 1961, to succeed Thomas Dehler.)	FDP
Saarland	244	Saarbrücken-Stadt	Rudolf Hussong (Note: Rudolf Hussong died on 10 December 1967.)	SPD
Saarland	245	Saarbrücken-Land	Heinrich Draeger	CDU
Saarland	246	Saarlouis	Josef Schmitt	CDU
Saarland	247	Ottweiler	Leo Gottesleben	CDU
Saarland	248	St. Ingbert	Johann Klein	CDU
Saarland	List		Alwin Brück	SPD
Saarland	List		Alwin Kulawig	SPD
Saarland	List		Werner Wilhelm	SPD
Saarland	List		Andreas Baltes (Note: Andreas Baltes took office on 15 December 1967, to succeed Rudolf Hussong.)	SPD
West Berlin			Klaus Dieter Arndt	SPD
West Berlin			Willy Bartsch	SPD
West Berlin			Margarete Berger-Heise	SPD
West Berlin			Josef Braun (Note: Josef Braun died on 17 July 1966.)	SPD
West Berlin			Reinhard Bühling	SPD
West Berlin			Edith Krappe	SPD
West Berlin			Harry Liehr	SPD
West Berlin			Kurt Mattick	SPD
West Berlin			Franz Neumann	SPD
West Berlin			Ernst Schellenberg	SPD
West Berlin			Karl Schiller	SPD
West Berlin			Klaus-Peter Schulz	SPD
West Berlin			Franz Seume	SPD
West Berlin			Wilhelm Urban	SPD
West Berlin			Hans Wellmann (Note: Hans Wellmann died on 30 May 1969.)	SPD
West Berlin			Dora Lösche (Note: Dora Lösche took office on 29 July 1966, to succeed Josef Braun.)	SPD
West Berlin			Hellmut Sieglerschmidt (Note: Hellmut Sieglerschmidt took office on 4 June 1969, to succeed Hans Wellmann.)	SPD
West Berlin			Ernst Benda	CDU
West Berlin			Johann Baptist Gradl	CDU
West Berlin			Ernst Lemmer	CDU
West Berlin			Agnes Katharina Maxsein	CDU
West Berlin			Johannes Müller	CDU
West Berlin			Josef Stingl (Note: Josef Stingl resigned on 15 June 1968.)	CDU
West Berlin			Liselotte Pieser (Note: Liselotte Pieser took office on 26 June 1968, to succeed Josef Stingl.)	CDU
West Berlin			William Borm	FDP

== See also ==
- Politics of Germany
- List of Bundestag Members
