= Effertz =

Effertz is a German surname. Notable people with the surname include:

- Horst Effertz (born 1938), German rower
- Josef Effertz (1907–1984), German politician
- Otto Effertz (1856–1921), German economist
