= Astrid Damerow =

German politician (born 1958)

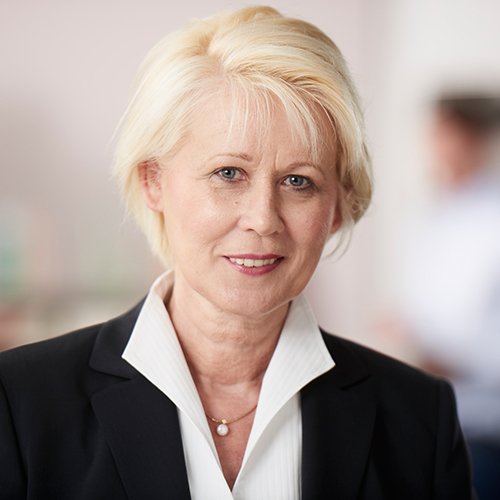
- Astrid Damerow in 2017

Member of the Bundestag for Nordfriesland – Dithmarschen Nord
- In office 2017–2025
- Preceded by: Ingbert Liebing
- Succeeded by: Leif Bodin

Personal details
- Born: 30 March 1958 (age 68) Bonndorf, West Germany
- Party: CDU

Astrid Damerow (born 30 March 1958) is a German politician of the Christian Democratic Union (CDU). Born in Bonndorf, Baden-Württemberg, she served as a member of the Bundestag from the state of Schleswig-Holstein from 2017 to 2025. From 2009 to 2017, she was a member of the Schleswig-Holstein state parliament for the Südtondern constituency.

== Family, education and career ==
In 1978, at the age of 20, Damerow obtained her technical college entrance qualification at the high school in Emmendingen. After an internship, she studied architecture. After completing her studies, she was a housewife from 1983 to 1987, then completed training as a savings bank clerk and became assistant to the board of Sparkasse Staufen. From 1993 to 2004 she was a housewife again. In 2004, Damerow completed training as a business coach and business trainer and has been a management consultant and managing partner of Damerow Consulting Partners GmbH with her husband until 2017.

Astrid Damerow is married to Rolf-Jürgen Damerow and has a son.

== Political career ==
From 2003 to 2008, Damerow was active for the CDU in the Karlum municipal council and was deputy mayor of the Karlum municipality from 2008 to 2013.From 2003 to 2010, she was also a member of the North Frisia district council. She was deputy group leader of the CDU district council group until 2008. Following, she was group leader and member of the supervisory board of Klinikum Nordfriesland GmbH from 2008 to 2010. Damerow was directly elected to the state parliament for the Südtondern state constituency in the early state elections in Schleswig-Holstein in 2009 with a first vote of 41.1 %. During the state election period from 2009 to 2012, she was a member of the finance committee and deputy chairwoman of the interior and legal committee. At the time, she was the spokesperson for refugee and integration policy in the CDU state parliamentary group. In the state elections in Schleswig-Holstein in 2012, she defended her direct mandate in the Südtondern state constituency with 41.6 % of the vote. She was then chairwoman of the European working group of the CDU state parliamentary group and a member of the European committee. In the CDU parliamentary group, she was deputy parliamentary group leader and spokesperson for the Bundeswehr, integration policy, refugee policy, minorities and European policy from 2012. Damerow was a member of the judges' election committee as well as in the committees of the North Schleswigers, the Frisians and the Sinti and Roma.

Damerow first became a member of the Bundestag after the 2017 German federal election as the direct candidate in the Nordfriesland – Dithmarschen Nord constituency. In parliament, she served as a member of the Committee on Tourism and the Committee on the Environment, Nature Conservation and Nuclear Safety. With 45.1 % of the vote, she prevailed against the SPD candidate Matthias Ilgen. At the end of the 18th electoral term, she left the Schleswig-Holstein state parliament because of her candidacy for the Bundestag. Damerow also served as a deputy member of the Committee on Human Rights and Humanitarian Aid and the Committee on Transport and Digital Infrastructure. In the 2021 federal election, Damerow, once again, won the direct mandate with 30.4% of the initial votes. In the 20th German Bundestag, Damerow serves as a full member and chairwoman of the CDU/CSU parliamentary group in the Committee for the Environment, Nature Conservation, Nuclear Safety and Consumer Protection and in the Committee for Food and Agriculture. She is also secretary of the German Bundestag.

In April 2024, Damerow announced that she would not stand in the 2025 federal elections but instead resign from active politics by the end of the parliamentary term.

== Literature ==
- Thomas Steensen: North Frisia. People from A-Z. Husum printing and publishing company, Husum 2020, ISBN 978-3-96717-027-6, p. 82f.
