= Rhein-Erft-Kreis I =

Federal electoral district of Germany

90 Rhein-Erft-Kreis I
- Electoral district for the Bundestag
- Rhein-Erft-Kreis I in 2025
- State: North Rhine-Westphalia
- Population: 340,100 (2019)
- Electorate: 249,035 (2021)
- Major settlements: Kerpen; Bergheim; Hürth
- Area: 525.3 km^{2}

Current electoral district
- Created: 1949
- Party: CDU
- Member: Georg Kippels
- Elected: 2013, 2017, 2021, 2025

Rhein-Erft-Kreis I is an electoral constituency (German: Wahlkreis) represented in the Bundestag. It elects one member via first-past-the-post voting. Under the current constituency numbering system, it is designated as constituency 90. It is located in western North Rhine-Westphalia, comprising most of the Rhein-Erft-Kreis district.

Rhein-Erft-Kreis I was created for the inaugural 1949 federal election. Since 2013, it has been represented by Georg Kippels of the Christian Democratic Union (CDU).

== Geography ==
Rhein-Erft-Kreis I is located in western North Rhine-Westphalia. As of the 2021 federal election, it comprises the entirety of the Rhein-Erft-Kreis district excluding the municipalities of Brühl, Erftstadt, and Wesseling.

== History ==
Rhein-Erft-Kreis I was created in 1949, then known as Köln-Land. In the 1976 through 2009 elections, it was named Erftkreis I. It acquired its current name in the 2013 election. In the 1949 election, it was North Rhine-Westphalia constituency 6 in the numbering system. In the 1953 through 1961 elections, it was number 65. From 1965 through 1976, it was number 58. From 1980 through 1998, it was number 57. From 2002 through 2009, it was number 92. In the 2013 through 2021 elections, it was number 91. From the 2025 election, it has been number 90.

Originally, the constituency was coterminous with the district of Landkreis Köln. It acquired its current borders in the 1980 election. The Erftkreis district was renamed Rhein-Erft-Kreis in 2003, but the constituency's borders did not change.

Election	No.	Name	Borders
1949	6	Köln-Land	Landkreis Köln district
1953	65	Köln-Land	Landkreis Köln district
1957	65	Köln-Land	Landkreis Köln district
1961	65	Köln-Land	Landkreis Köln district
1965	58	Köln-Land	Landkreis Köln district
1969	58	Köln-Land	Landkreis Köln district
1972	58	Köln-Land	Landkreis Köln district
1976	58	Erftkreis I	Landkreis Köln district
1980	57	Erftkreis I	Erftkreis district (excluding Brühl, Erftstadt, and Wesseling municipalities)
1983	57	Erftkreis I	Erftkreis district (excluding Brühl, Erftstadt, and Wesseling municipalities)
1987	57	Erftkreis I	Erftkreis district (excluding Brühl, Erftstadt, and Wesseling municipalities)
1990	57	Erftkreis I	Erftkreis district (excluding Brühl, Erftstadt, and Wesseling municipalities)
1994	57	Erftkreis I	Erftkreis district (excluding Brühl, Erftstadt, and Wesseling municipalities)
1998	57	Erftkreis I	Erftkreis district (excluding Brühl, Erftstadt, and Wesseling municipalities)
2002	92	Erftkreis I	Erftkreis district (excluding Brühl, Erftstadt, and Wesseling municipalities)
2005	92	Erftkreis I	Rhein-Erft-Kreis district (excluding Brühl, Erftstadt, and Wesseling municipalities)
2009	92	Erftkreis I	Rhein-Erft-Kreis district (excluding Brühl, Erftstadt, and Wesseling municipalities)
2013	91	Rhein-Erft-Kreis I	Rhein-Erft-Kreis district (excluding Brühl, Erftstadt, and Wesseling municipalities)
2017	91	Rhein-Erft-Kreis I	Rhein-Erft-Kreis district (excluding Brühl, Erftstadt, and Wesseling municipalities)
2021	91	Rhein-Erft-Kreis I	Rhein-Erft-Kreis district (excluding Brühl, Erftstadt, and Wesseling municipalities)
2025	90	Rhein-Erft-Kreis I	Rhein-Erft-Kreis district (excluding Brühl, Erftstadt, and Wesseling municipalities)

== Members ==
The constituency was first represented by Aloys Lenz of the Christian Democratic Union (CDU) from 1949 to 1969. The Social Democratic Party (SPD)'s candidate Rudi Adams won it in 1969 and served until 1980. He was succeeded by fellow SPD member Klaus Lennartz until 2002. Gabriele Frechen of the SPD then served from 2002 to 2009. Willi Zylajew of the CDU was elected in the 2009 election and served a single term. Georg Kippels was elected in 2013, and re-elected in 2017, 2021 and 2025.

Election	Member	Party	%
1949	Aloys Lenz	CDU	43.0
1953	Aloys Lenz	CDU	53.6
1957	Aloys Lenz	CDU	58.8
1961	Aloys Lenz	CDU	53.6
1965	Aloys Lenz	CDU	51.9
1969	Rudi Adams	SPD	48.8
1972	Rudi Adams	SPD	53.2
1976	Rudi Adams	SPD	46.4
1980	Klaus Lennartz	SPD	52.1
1983	Klaus Lennartz	SPD	48.3
1987	Klaus Lennartz	SPD	50.8
1990	Klaus Lennartz	SPD	52.1
1994	Klaus Lennartz	SPD	51.2
1998	Klaus Lennartz	SPD	53.0
2002	Gabriele Frechen	SPD	48.9
2005	Gabriele Frechen	SPD	47.8
2009	Willi Zylajew	CDU	39.4
2013	Georg Kippels	CDU	47.3
2017	Georg Kippels	CDU	39.2
2021	Georg Kippels	CDU	33.0
2025	Georg Kippels	CDU	35.0

== Election results ==
=== 2025 election ===
Federal election (2025): Rhein-Erft-Kreis I
Notes:	Blue background denotes the winner of the electorate vote. Pink background denotes a candidate elected from their party list. Yellow background denotes an electorate win by a list member, or other incumbent. A ✓ or ✗ denotes status of any incumbent, win or lose respectively.						
Party	Candidate	Votes	%	±%	Party votes	%	±%
CDU	✓ Georg Kippels	71,773	35.0	▲2.0	65,147	31.6	▲3.2
SPD	Aaron Spielmanns	53,609	26.1	▼4.4	40,600	19.7	▼8.6
AfD	Jeremy Jason	34,346	16.7	▲9.7	34,400	16.7	▲9.8
Greens	Björn Leschny	20,959	10.2	▼3.0	23,825	11.6	▼2.7
Left	Fritz Laser	13,221	6.4	▲3.4	14,819	7.2	▲4.3
BSW					8,732	4.2	
FDP	Stefan Westerschulze	7,549	3.7	▼5.4	10,293	5.0	▼7.5
Tierschutzpartei					2,798	1.4	▼0.1
FW	Ulrich Wokulat	2,567	1.3	▲0.1	1,089	0.5	▼0.2
Volt					1,391	0.7	▲0.3
BD	Franz Pesch	1,318	0.6		425	0.2	
PARTEI					930	0.5	▼0.3
Team Todenhöfer					460	0.2	▼0.6
dieBasis				▼1.1	443	0.2	▼0.7
PdF					371	0.2	▲0.1
Values					130	0.1	
MERA25					82	0.0	
MLPD					30	0.0	0.0
Pirates				▼1.5			▼0.6
Gesundheitsforschung							▼0.1
Humanists							▼0.1
ÖDP							▼0.1
Bündnis C						0.0	0.0
SGP						0.0	0.0
Informal votes		1,832			1,209		
Total valid votes		205,342			205,965		
Turnout		207,174	83.8	▲5.5			
CDU hold	Majority	18,164	8.9	▲8.2			

=== 2021 election ===
Federal election (2021): Rhein-Erft-Kreis I
Notes:	Blue background denotes the winner of the electorate vote. Pink background denotes a candidate elected from their party list. Yellow background denotes an electorate win by a list member, or other incumbent. A ✓ or ✗ denotes status of any incumbent, win or lose respectively.						
Party	Candidate	Votes	%	±%	Party votes	%	±%
CDU	✓ Georg Kippels	63,635	33.0	▼6.2	55,068	28.5	▼5.1
SPD	Aaron Spielmanns	58,858	30.5	▼0.5	54,714	28.3	▲1.9
Greens	Rüdiger Warnecke	25,409	13.2	▲7.7	27,566	14.3	▲7.7
FDP	Stefan Westerschulze	17,542	9.1	▼0.2	24,227	12.5	▼1.9
AfD	Eugen Schmidt	13,537	7.0	▼2.0	13,417	6.9	▼2.6
Left	Sirin Seitz	5,889	3.1	▼1.5	5,682	2.9	▼3.1
Tierschutzpartei					2,767	1.4	▲0.6
Team Todenhöfer					1,627	0.8	
PARTEI					1,446	0.7	▲0.1
Pirates	Kristian Katzmarek	2,860	1.5	▲0.3	1,237	0.6	▲0.1
dieBasis	Patrik Müller	2,218	1.1		1,762	0.9	
FW	Ulrich Wokulat	2,132	1.1		1,439	0.7	▲0.5
Volt					708	0.4	
LIEBE	Helene Susojev	873	0.5		471	0.2	
Gesundheitsforschung					215	0.1	0.0
LfK					183	0.1	
NPD					167	0.1	▼0.1
Humanists					147	0.1	0.0
ÖDP					100	0.1	0.0
V-Partei3					99	0.1	0.0
du.					93	0.0	
Bündnis C					65	0.0	
PdF					70	0.0	
LKR					52	0.2	
DKP					32	0.0	0.0
MLPD					27	0.0	0.0
SGP					20	0.0	0.0
Informal votes		1,909			1,461		
Total valid votes		192,953			193,401		
Turnout		194,862	78.2	▲1.3			
CDU hold	Majority	4,777	2.5	▼5.5			

=== 2017 election ===
Federal election (2017): Rhein-Erft-Kreis I
Notes:	Blue background denotes the winner of the electorate vote. Pink background denotes a candidate elected from their party list. Yellow background denotes an electorate win by a list member, or other incumbent. A ✓ or ✗ denotes status of any incumbent, win or lose respectively.						
Party	Candidate	Votes	%	±%	Party votes	%	±%
CDU	✓ Georg Kippels	74,207	39.2	▼8.1	63,664	33.5	▼8.7
SPD	Dierk Timm	58,792	31.1	▼5.0	50,014	26.3	▼4.5
FDP	Christian Pohlmann	17,648	9.3	▲6.3	27,398	14.4	▲8.7
AfD	Franz Pesch	17,113	9.0		18,091	9.5	▲5.8
Greens	Rüdiger Warnecke	10,354	5.5	▼0.1	12,526	6.6	▼0.3
Left	Zeki Gökhan	8,590	4.5	▲0.1	11,392	6.0	▲0.8
Tierschutzpartei					1,505	0.8	
PARTEI					1,263	0.7	▲0.3
Pirates	Marius Hövel	2,306	1.2	▼2.4	1,032	0.5	▼1.6
AD-DEMOKRATEN					609	0.3	
FW					508	0.3	▼0.2
NPD					426	0.2	▼0.8
Independent	Tevfik Çelikkan	329	0.2				
Volksabstimmung					238	0.1	▼0.1
DiB					199	0.1	
V-Partei³					181	0.1	
Gesundheitsforschung					168	0.1	
BGE					158	0.1	
DM					155	0.1	
ÖDP					132	0.1	▼0.1
Die Humanisten					131	0.1	
MLPD					45	0.0	0.0
DKP					17	0.0	
SGP					16	0.0	0.0
Informal votes		2,166			1,637		
Total valid votes		189,339			189,868		
Turnout		191,505	76.9	▲3.1			
CDU hold	Majority	15,415	8.1	▼3.2			

=== 2013 election ===
Federal election (2013): Rhein-Erft-Kreis I
Notes:	Blue background denotes the winner of the electorate vote. Pink background denotes a candidate elected from their party list. Yellow background denotes an electorate win by a list member, or other incumbent. A ✓ or ✗ denotes status of any incumbent, win or lose respectively.						
Party	Candidate	Votes	%	±%	Party votes	%	±%
CDU	Georg Kippels	83,598	47.3	▲7.9	75,521	42.3	▲8.1
SPD	Dierk Timm	63,676	36.0	▲0.2	55,089	30.8	▲3.2
Greens	Elmar Gillet	9,822	5.6	▼0.8	12,264	6.9	▼2.2
Left	Zeki Gökhan	7,820	4.4	▼1.9	9,266	5.2	▼2.2
Pirates	Alexandra Osburg	6,469	3.7		3,865	2.2	▲0.7
FDP	Martin Wortmann	5,390	3.0	▼7.4	10,235	5.7	▼10.9
AfD					6,660	3.7	
NPD					1,769	1.0	▼0.1
FW					747	0.4	
PRO					700	0.4	
PARTEI					691	0.4	
Volksabstimmung					407	0.2	▲0.1
Nichtwahler					313	0.2	
REP					245	0.1	▼0.1
Party of Reason					227	0.1	
BIG					225	0.1	
ÖDP					221	0.1	▲0.1
RRP					108	0.1	0.0
Die Rechte					73	0.0	
BüSo					46	0.0	0.0
PSG					44	0.0	0.0
MLPD					19	0.0	0.0
Informal votes		6,195			4,235		
Total valid votes		176,775			178,735		
Turnout		182,970	73.9	▲0.5			
CDU hold	Majority	19,922	11.3	▲7.7			

=== 2009 election ===
Federal election (2009): Erftkreis I
Notes:	Blue background denotes the winner of the electorate vote. Pink background denotes a candidate elected from their party list. Yellow background denotes an electorate win by a list member, or other incumbent. A ✓ or ✗ denotes status of any incumbent, win or lose respectively.						
Party	Candidate	Votes	%	±%	Party votes	%	±%
CDU	Willi Zylajew	69,845	39.4	▼0.1	60,798	34.2	▲0.6
SPD	Gabriele Frechen	63,487	35.8	▼12.0	49,072	27.6	▼13.3
FDP	Lars Oliver Effertz	18,620	10.5	▲5.6	29,495	16.6	▲5.4
Left	Wilhelm Dedecke	11,215	6.3	▲2.6	13,214	7.4	▲2.8
Greens	Johannes Bortlisz-Dickhoff	11,195	6.3	▲3.2	16,136	9.1	▲2.3
Pirates					2,688	1.5	
NPD	Axel Reitz	2,620	1.5	▲0.4	1,952	1.1	▲0.3
Tierschutzpartei					1,333	0.7	▲0.1
RENTNER					933	0.5	
FAMILIE					793	0.4	0.0
REP					500	0.3	0.0
Volksabstimmung					236	0.1	0.0
RRP					195	0.1	
ÖDP					151	0.1	
DVU					98	0.1	
Centre					80	0.1	0.0
BüSo					42	0.0	0.0
MLPD					33	0.0	0.0
PSG					29	0.0	0.0
Informal votes		2,597			2,259		
Total valid votes		177,440			177,778		
Turnout		180,037	73.4	▼6.2			
CDU gain from SPD	Majority	6,358	3.6				

=== 2005 election ===
Federal election (2005): Erftkreis I
Notes:	Blue background denotes the winner of the electorate vote. Pink background denotes a candidate elected from their party list. Yellow background denotes an electorate win by a list member, or other incumbent. A ✓ or ✗ denotes status of any incumbent, win or lose respectively.						
Party	Candidate	Votes	%	±%	Party votes	%	±%
SPD	✓ Gabriele Frechen	90,150	47.8	▼1.1	77,413	40.9	▼2.8
CDU	Willi Zylajew	74,380	39.5	▲2.3	63,432	33.6	▼0.7
FDP	Lars Oliver Effertz	9,168	4.9	▼2.8	21,187	11.2	▲0.6
Left	Hans Decruppe	7,041	3.7	▲2.9	8,853	4.7	▲3.8
Greens	Johannes Bortlisz-Dickhoff	5,797	3.1	▼1.1	12,838	6.8	▼1.4
NPD					1,562	0.8	▲0.6
Tierschutzpartei					1,177	0.6	▲0.2
GRAUEN					840	0.4	▲0.1
Familie					792	0.4	▲0.2
REP					475	0.3	▼0.1
From Now on... Democracy Through Referendum					184	0.1	
PBC					82	0.0	
Socialist Equality Party					82	0.0	
BüSo					58	0.0	
Centre					47	0.0	
MLPD					37	0.0	0.0
Informal votes		3,083			2,516		
Total valid votes		188,492			189,059		
Turnout		191,575	79.5	▼2.1			
SPD hold	Majority	15,770	8.3				
