= Chlum Svaté Maří =

- Municipality
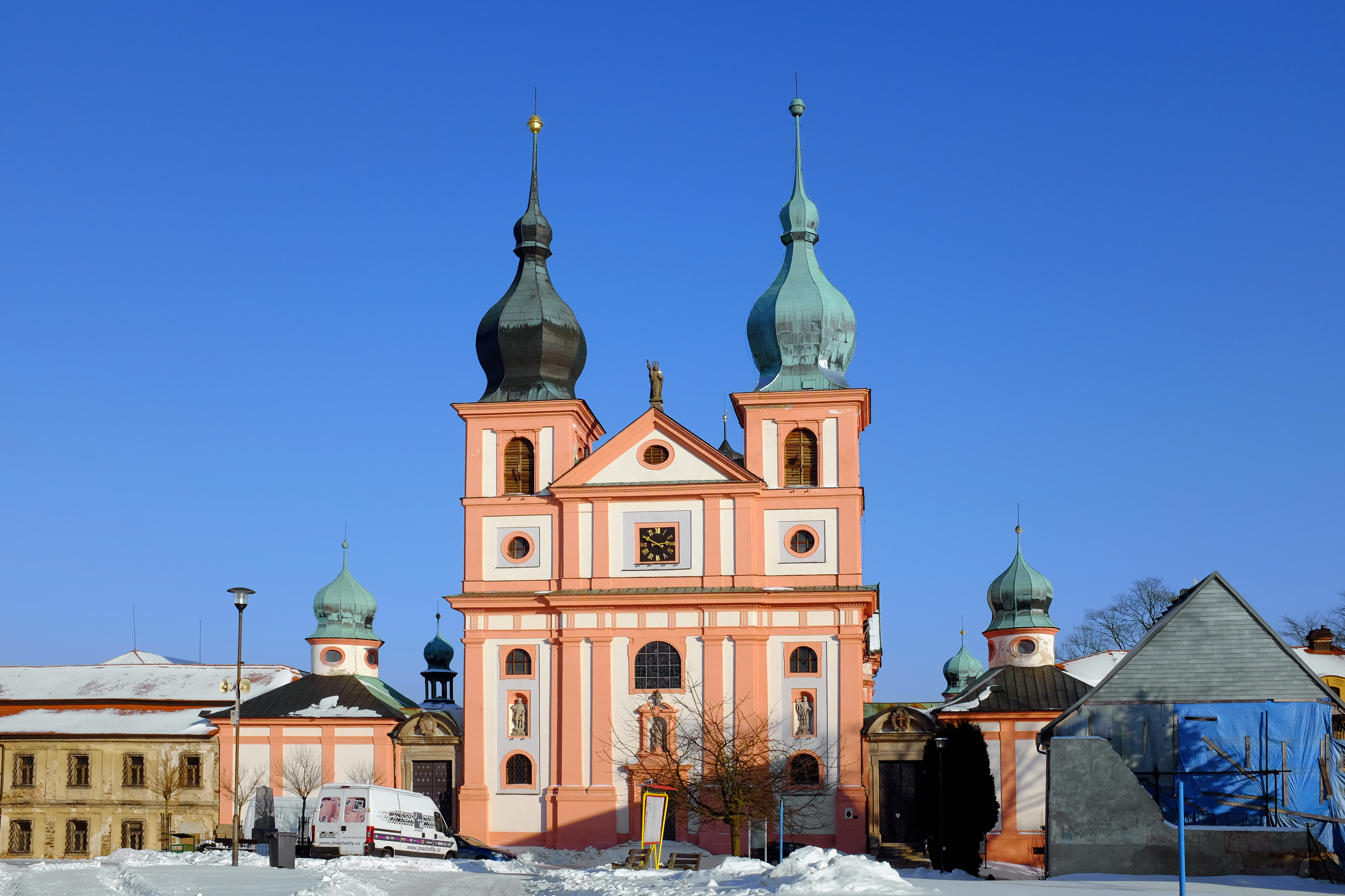
- Church of the Assumption of the Virgin Mary and Saint Mary Magdalene

- Coat of arms

- Location in the Czech Republic
- Coordinates: 50°9′0″N 12°32′9″E
- Country: Czech Republic
- Region: Karlovy Vary
- District: Sokolov
- First mentioned: 1341

Area
  - Total: 4.70 km^{2} (1.81 sq mi)
- Elevation: 539 m (1,768 ft)

Population (2026-01-01)
  - Total: 314
  - Density: 66.8/km^{2} (173/sq mi)
- Time zone: UTC+1 (CET)
  - Summer (DST): UTC+2 (CEST)
- Postal code: 357 09
- Website: www.chlumsvatemari.cz

Chlum Svaté Maří (in 1961–1990 Chlum nad Ohří; German: Maria Kulm) is a municipality and village in Sokolov District in the Karlovy Vary Region of the Czech Republic. It has about 300 inhabitants.

== Demographics ==
Historical population
Year	Pop.	±%
1869	1,469	—
1880	1,379	−6.1%
1890	1,333	−3.3%
1900	1,465	+9.9%
1910	1,516	+3.5%
1921	1,553	+2.4%
1930	1,543	−0.6%
1950	688	−55.4%
1961	642	−6.7%
1970	472	−26.5%
1980	326	−30.9%
1991	283	−13.2%
2001	298	+5.3%
2011	301	+1.0%
2021	266	−11.6%
Source: Censuses

== Notable people ==
- Josef Stingl (1919–2004), German politician
