= Karl Weber (politician, born 1898) =

German politician (1898–1985)

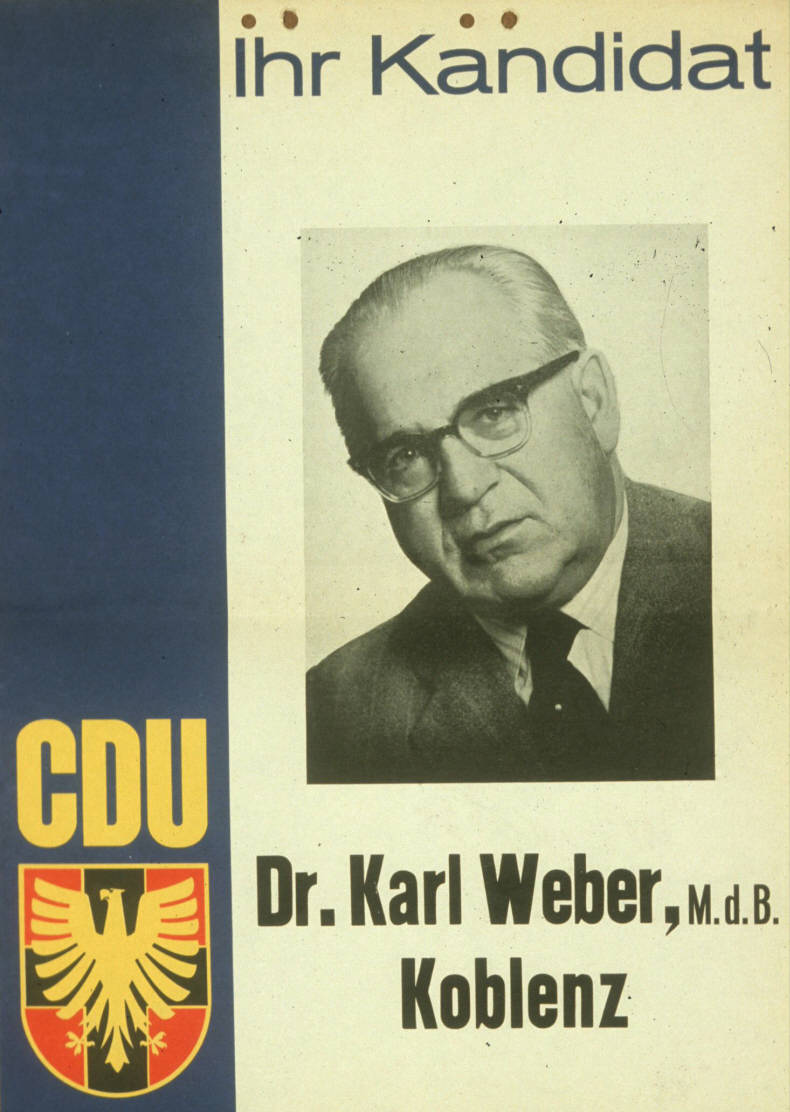
Weber on a 1961 CDU election poster.

Karl Weber (8 March 1898 in Arensberg – 21 May 1985 in Koblenz) was a West German politician with the Christian Democratic Union. He served as the Minister of Justice from 2 April 1965 until his replacement by Richard Jaeger in 26 October of that same year. From 1916 till 1918 he served in the First World War, then he studied legal science in Bonn. From 1939 till 1945 he served in the Second World War.
