= Nordfriesland – Dithmarschen Nord =

Federal electoral district of Germany

2 Nordfriesland – Dithmarschen Nord
- Electoral district for the Bundestag
- Nordfriesland – Dithmarschen Nord in 2025
- State: Schleswig-Holstein
- Population: 235,000 (2019)
- Electorate: 188,267 (2021)
- Major settlements: Husum; Heide
- Area: 2,777.9 km^{2}

Current electoral district
- Created: 1965
- Party: CDU
- Member: Leif Bodin
- Elected: 2025

Nordfriesland – Dithmarschen Nord (English: North Frisia – Dithmarschen North) is an electoral constituency (German: Wahlkreis) represented in the Bundestag. It elects one member via first-past-the-post voting. Under the current constituency numbering system, it is designated as constituency 2. It is located in northwestern Schleswig-Holstein, comprising the Nordfriesland district and the northern part of the Dithmarschen district.

Nordfriesland – Dithmarschen Nord was created for the 1965 federal election. Since 2025, it has been represented by Leif Bodin of the Christian Democratic Union (CDU). Before then it was held by Astrid Damerow also from the CDU.

== Geography ==
Nordfriesland – Dithmarschen Nord is located in northwestern Schleswig-Holstein. As of the 2021 federal election, it comprises the district of Nordfriesland and the northern part of the Dithmarschen district, specifically the urban municipality of Heide and the Ämter of Büsum-Wesselburen, Eider, and Heider Umland.

== History ==
Nordfriesland – Dithmarschen Nord was created in 1965, then known as Husum. It contained parts of the abolished constituencies of Husum – Südtondern – Eiderstedt and Norder- und Süderdithmarschen. Until 1972, it was constituency 3 in the numbering system. From 1972 until 2002, its name contained a hyphen between "Dithmarschen" and "Nord".

In the elections of 1965 and 1969, Husum consisted of the districts of Husum, Südtondern, Eiderstedt, and Norderdithmarschen. After reform of the administrative divisions in Schleswig-Holstein, the constituency acquired its current name and configuration, containing Nordfriesland and the northern part of Dithmarschen.

Election	No.	Name	Borders
1965	3	Husum	Husum district; Südtondern district; Eiderstedt district; Norderdithmarschen district
1969	3	Husum	Husum district; Südtondern district; Eiderstedt district; Norderdithmarschen district
1972	2	Nordfriesland – Dithmarschen-Nord	Nordfriesland district; Dithmarschen district (only Heide municipality, Büsum-Wesselburen Amt, Eider Amt, and Heider Umland Amt)
1976	2	Nordfriesland – Dithmarschen-Nord	Nordfriesland district; Dithmarschen district (only Heide municipality, Büsum-Wesselburen Amt, Eider Amt, and Heider Umland Amt)
1980	2	Nordfriesland – Dithmarschen-Nord	Nordfriesland district; Dithmarschen district (only Heide municipality, Büsum-Wesselburen Amt, Eider Amt, and Heider Umland Amt)
1983	2	Nordfriesland – Dithmarschen-Nord	Nordfriesland district; Dithmarschen district (only Heide municipality, Büsum-Wesselburen Amt, Eider Amt, and Heider Umland Amt)
1987	2	Nordfriesland – Dithmarschen-Nord	Nordfriesland district; Dithmarschen district (only Heide municipality, Büsum-Wesselburen Amt, Eider Amt, and Heider Umland Amt)
1990	2	Nordfriesland – Dithmarschen-Nord	Nordfriesland district; Dithmarschen district (only Heide municipality, Büsum-Wesselburen Amt, Eider Amt, and Heider Umland Amt)
1994	2	Nordfriesland – Dithmarschen-Nord	Nordfriesland district; Dithmarschen district (only Heide municipality, Büsum-Wesselburen Amt, Eider Amt, and Heider Umland Amt)
1998	2	Nordfriesland – Dithmarschen-Nord	Nordfriesland district; Dithmarschen district (only Heide municipality, Büsum-Wesselburen Amt, Eider Amt, and Heider Umland Amt)
2002	2	Nordfriesland – Dithmarschen Nord	Nordfriesland district; Dithmarschen district (only Heide municipality, Büsum-Wesselburen Amt, Eider Amt, and Heider Umland Amt)
2005	2	Nordfriesland – Dithmarschen Nord	Nordfriesland district; Dithmarschen district (only Heide municipality, Büsum-Wesselburen Amt, Eider Amt, and Heider Umland Amt)
2009	2	Nordfriesland – Dithmarschen Nord	Nordfriesland district; Dithmarschen district (only Heide municipality, Büsum-Wesselburen Amt, Eider Amt, and Heider Umland Amt)
2013	2	Nordfriesland – Dithmarschen Nord	Nordfriesland district; Dithmarschen district (only Heide municipality, Büsum-Wesselburen Amt, Eider Amt, and Heider Umland Amt)
2017	2	Nordfriesland – Dithmarschen Nord	Nordfriesland district; Dithmarschen district (only Heide municipality, Büsum-Wesselburen Amt, Eider Amt, and Heider Umland Amt)
2021	2	Nordfriesland – Dithmarschen Nord	Nordfriesland district; Dithmarschen district (only Heide municipality, Büsum-Wesselburen Amt, Eider Amt, and Heider Umland Amt)
2025	2	Nordfriesland – Dithmarschen Nord	Nordfriesland district; Dithmarschen district (only Heide municipality, Büsum-Wesselburen Amt, Eider Amt, and Heider Umland Amt)

== Members ==
The constituency has been held by the Christian Democratic Union (CDU) during all but two Bundestag terms since its creation in 1965. Its first representative was the CDU's Hermann Glüsing (1965–72), followed by Willi-Peter Sick (1972–80). It was won by the Social Democratic Party (SPD) in 1980, and represented by Wolfgang Rayer for a single term, before returning to the CDU in 1983. Between then and 1998, it was represented by future Minister-President of Schleswig-Holstein Peter Harry Carstensen. The constituency was won by the SPD's Manfred Opel in 1998, but again returned to the CDU in 2002, and was represented by Carstensen for another term. He was succeeded by Ingbert Liebing in 2005, who was in turn succeeded by Astrid Damerow in 2017. She was re-elected in 2021.

Election	Member	Party	%
1965	Hermann Glüsing	CDU	57.0
1969	Hermann Glüsing	CDU	53.2
1972	Willi-Peter Sick	CDU	46.5
1976	Willi-Peter Sick	CDU	48.1
1980	Wolfgang Rayer	SPD	44.9
1983	Peter Harry Carstensen	CDU	52.7
1987	Peter Harry Carstensen	CDU	47.1
1990	Peter Harry Carstensen	CDU	49.1
1994	Peter Harry Carstensen	CDU	48.4
1998	Manfred Opel	SPD	46.2
2002	Peter Harry Carstensen	CDU	44.3
2005	Ingbert Liebing	CDU	47.9
2009	Ingbert Liebing	CDU	43.1
2013	Ingbert Liebing	CDU	49.8
2017	Astrid Damerow	CDU	45.1
2021	Astrid Damerow	CDU	30.4
2025	Leif Bodin	CDU	32.7

== Election results ==
=== 2025 election ===
Federal election (2025): Nordfriesland – Dithmarschen Nord
Notes:	Blue background denotes the winner of the electorate vote. Pink background denotes a candidate elected from their party list. Yellow background denotes an electorate win by a list member, or other incumbent. A ✓ or ✗ denotes status of any incumbent, win or lose respectively.						
Party	Candidate	Votes	%	±%	Party votes	%	±%
CDU	Leif Bodin	49,866	32.7	▲2.3	45,300	29.6	▲5.0
SPD	Truels Reichardt	31,169	20.4	▼7.4	26,637	17.4	▼8.9
AfD	Kurt Kleinschmidt	24,472	16.0	▲10.3	24,564	16.1	▲10.0
Greens	Denise Loop	16,627	10.9	▼3.4	18,763	12.3	▼3.4
SSW	Lukas Knöfler	14,253	9.3	▲2.8	12,263	8.0	▲1.4
Left	Lars Thiele-Kensbock	7,919	5.2	▲2.4	9,437	6.2	▲3.1
FDP	Gyde Jensen-Bornhöft	5,749	3.8	▼5.9	7,617	5.0	▼7.7
BSW					4,906	3.2	New
FW	Maiken Vester	1,485	1.0	▼0.1	1,098	0.7	0.0
PARTEI					1,067	0.7	▼0.2
Volt	Mats Rathmann	1,172	0.8	New	1,023	0.7	▲0.5
BD					177	0.1	New
MLPD					48	<0.1	0.0
Informal votes		1,043			855		
Total valid votes		152,712			152,900		
Turnout		153,755	82.7	▲5.4			
CDU hold	Majority	18,697	12.3	▲9.7			

=== 2021 election ===
Federal election (2021): Nordfriesland – Dithmarschen Nord
Notes:	Blue background denotes the winner of the electorate vote. Pink background denotes a candidate elected from their party list. Yellow background denotes an electorate win by a list member, or other incumbent. A ✓ or ✗ denotes status of any incumbent, win or lose respectively.						
Party	Candidate	Votes	%	±%	Party votes	%	±%
CDU	✓ Astrid Damerow	43,745	30.4	▼14.8	35,511	24.6	▼13.7
SPD	Jens Peter Jensen	40,026	27.8	▲2.6	37,926	26.3	▲3.8
Greens	Denise Loop	20,611	14.3	▲4.9	22,588	15.7	▲4.7
FDP	Gyde Jensen	13,958	9.7	▲1.6	18,350	12.7	▼0.3
SSW	Sybilla Nitsch	9,410	6.5		9,516	6.6	
AfD	Andrej Clasen	8,274	5.7	▼0.1	8,798	6.1	▼0.4
Left	Hartmut Jensen	4,060	2.8	▼2.3	4,437	3.1	▼3.1
dieBasis	Sandor Stolz	2,254	1.6		1,836	1.3	
Tierschutzpartei					1,604	1.1	
PARTEI					1,322	0.9	▼0.1
FW	Traymont Wilhelmi	1,510	1.0	▼0.1	1,081	0.7	▲0.1
Team Todenhöfer					239	0.2	
Volt					237	0.2	
NPD					146	0.1	▼0.1
Humanists					130	0.1	
V-Partei3					125	0.1	
ÖDP					121	0.1	0.0
LKR	Axel Frey	202	0.1		60	0.0	
du.					59	0.0	
DKP					33	0.0	
MLPD					26	0.0	0.0
Informal votes		1,337			1,242		
Total valid votes		144,050			144,145		
Turnout		145,387	77.2	▲2.6			
CDU hold	Majority	3,719	2.6	▼17.3			

=== 2017 election ===
Federal election (2017): Nordfriesland – Dithmarschen Nord
Notes:	Blue background denotes the winner of the electorate vote. Pink background denotes a candidate elected from their party list. Yellow background denotes an electorate win by a list member, or other incumbent. A ✓ or ✗ denotes status of any incumbent, win or lose respectively.						
Party	Candidate	Votes	%	±%	Party votes	%	±%
CDU	Astrid Damerow	62,256	45.1	▼4.7	52,928	38.3	▼5.0
SPD	Matthias Ilgen	34,685	25.2	▼7.0	31,120	22.5	▼7.1
Greens	Arfst Wagner	13,026	9.4	▲2.9	15,144	11.0	▲2.9
FDP	Berthold Brodersen	11,105	8.1	▲5.6	18,050	13.1	▲6.7
AfD	Jürgen Izdebski	8,117	5.9	▲2.8	9,030	6.5	▲2.7
Left	Michael Schilke	7,102	5.2	▲1.6	8,589	6.2	▲1.8
FW	Michael Potthast	1,606	1.2		867	0.6	0.0
PARTEI					1,376	1.0	
BGE					430	0.3	
NPD					301	0.2	▼0.3
ÖDP					173	0.1	
MLPD					63	0.0	0.0
Informal votes		1,297			1,123		
Total valid votes		137,897			138,071		
Turnout		139,194	74.6	▲4.0			
CDU hold	Majority	27,571	19.9	▲2.2			

=== 2013 election ===
Federal election (2013): Nordfriesland – Dithmarschen Nord
Notes:	Blue background denotes the winner of the electorate vote. Pink background denotes a candidate elected from their party list. Yellow background denotes an electorate win by a list member, or other incumbent. A ✓ or ✗ denotes status of any incumbent, win or lose respectively.						
Party	Candidate	Votes	%	±%	Party votes	%	±%
CDU	✓ Ingbert Liebing	64,678	49.8	▲6.6	56,383	43.4	▲6.9
SPD	Matthias Ilgen	41,714	32.1	▲4.2	38,590	29.7	▲5.1
Greens	Arfst Wagner	8,465	6.5	▼3.3	10,547	8.1	▼3.2
Left	Norbert Meixner	4,653	3.6	▼2.7	5,733	4.4	▼2.3
AfD	Volker Wiethüchter	3,973	3.1		4,994	3.8	
Pirates	Oliver Sippel	2,467	1.9		2,413	1.9	▲0.2
FDP	Ulrich Schmück	3,172	2.4	▼9.1	8,321	6.4	▼10.8
Tierschutzpartei					969	0.7	
FW					755	0.6	
NPD	Jürgen Wilhelm Otto Töpke	757	0.6	▼0.4	733	0.6	▼0.3
Rentner					561	0.4	▼0.6
MLPD					45	0.0	0.0
Informal votes		1,648			1,483		
Total valid votes		129,879			130,044		
Turnout		131,527	70.6	▼1.4			
CDU hold	Majority	22,964	17.7	▲2.6			

=== 2009 election ===
Federal election (2009): Nordfriesland – Dithmarschen Nord
Notes:	Blue background denotes the winner of the electorate vote. Pink background denotes a candidate elected from their party list. Yellow background denotes an electorate win by a list member, or other incumbent. A ✓ or ✗ denotes status of any incumbent, win or lose respectively.						
Party	Candidate	Votes	%	±%	Party votes	%	±%
CDU	✓ Ingbert Liebing	56,751	43.2	▼4.7	47,947	36.5	▼5.2
SPD	Hanno Fecke	36,642	27.9	▼11.9	32,239	24.5	▼11.7
FDP	Ulrich Schmück	15,184	11.6	▲7.4	22,605	17.2	▲7.1
Greens	Valentin Seehausen	12,840	9.8	▲5.8	14,927	11.4	▲5.1
Left	Harry Otto Adolf Voß	8,208	6.3	▲3.0	8,836	6.7	▲2.9
Pirates					2,233	1.7	
Rentner					1,293	1.0	
NPD	Arne Kaehne	1,231	0.9	▲0.1	1,126	0.9	0.0
Independent		433	0.3				
DVU					194	0.1	
MLPD					53	0.0	0.0
Informal votes		3,382			3,218		
Total valid votes		131,289			131,453		
Turnout		134,671	72.0	▼5.9			
CDU hold	Majority	20,109	15.3	▲7.2			

=== 2005 election ===
Federal election (2005): Nordfriesland – Dithmarschen Nord
Notes:	Blue background denotes the winner of the electorate vote. Pink background denotes a candidate elected from their party list. Yellow background denotes an electorate win by a list member, or other incumbent. A ✓ or ✗ denotes status of any incumbent, win or lose respectively.						
Party	Candidate	Votes	%	±%	Party votes	%	±%
CDU	Ingbert Liebing	67,786	47.9	▲3.6	59,034	41.7	▲1.7
SPD	Ralf Heßmann	56,380	39.8	▼4.2	51,307	36.2	▼6.2
FDP	Veronika Kolb	5,907	4.2	▼1.2	14,270	10.1	▲1.9
Greens	Irene Fröhlich	5,670	4.0	▼0.4	8,854	6.2	▼0.3
Left	Uwe Wendt	4,542	3.2	▲2.1	5,475	3.9	▲2.8
Familie					1,508	1.1	
NPD	Uwe Schäfer	1,213	0.9		1,190	0.8	▲0.6
MLPD					82	0.1	
Informal votes		2,280			2,058		
Total valid votes		141,498			141,720		
Turnout		143,778	77.9	▼1.7			
CDU hold	Majority	11,406	8.1	▲7.8			

=== 2002 election ===
Federal election (2002): Nordfriesland – Dithmarschen Nord
Notes:	Blue background denotes the winner of the electorate vote. Pink background denotes a candidate elected from their party list. Yellow background denotes an electorate win by a list member, or other incumbent. A ✓ or ✗ denotes status of any incumbent, win or lose respectively.						
Party	Candidate	Votes	%	±%	Party votes	%	±%
CDU	Peter Harry Carstensen	63,230	44.3	▼1.1	57,134	40.0	▲0.8
SPD	✗ Manfred Opel	62,899	44.1	▼2.3	60,605	42.4	▼1.1
FDP	Veronika Kolb	7,602	5.3	▲2.4	11,721	8.2	▲0.4
Greens	Andreas Tietze	6,331	4.4	▲0.8	9,328	6.5	▲1.1
PDS	Jochen Lühr	1,592	1.1	▲0.1	1,587	1.1	0.0
Schill					1,365	1.0	New
GRAUEN	Christa Jars	743	0.5	0.0	437	0.3	0.0
PBC	Fred Reinhold	348	0.2		261	0.2	
HEIMAT					318	0.2	▲0.1
REP					145	0.1	▼0.1
Informal votes		1,762			1,606		
Total valid votes		142,745			142,901		
Turnout		144,507	79.6	▼1.5			
CDU gain from SPD	Majority	331	0.2				
