= Leif Bodin =

German lawyer and politician (born 1996)

Member of the Bundestag
- Incumbent
- Assumed office 25 March 2025
- Preceded by: Astrid Damerow
- Constituency: Nordfriesland – Dithmarschen Nord

Personal details
- Born: 20 June 1996 (age 30) Neubrandenburg
- Party: Christian Democratic Union

Leif Erik Bodin (born 20 June 1996) is a German lawyer and politician from the Christian Democratic Union of Germany. Since 2025, Bodin has served as a member of the Bundestag from the state of Schleswig-Holstein.

== Early life and education ==
Bodin grew up in Burg Stargard in Mecklenburg-Vorpommern before his family moved to Leck in Schleswig-Holstein. After graduating from the Friedrich-Paulsen School in Niebüll, Bodin studied law at the Christian-Albrechts University in Kiel. After the first state examination, he became a qualified lawyer.

Bodin is currently completing a Master of Laws (LL.M) degree and is specializing in the areas of public commercial law and labor law.

== Political career ==
Bodin worked as an employee for members of parliament in the constituency in the areas of press and public relations and as a topic-related speaker.

While still at school, Bodin became a member of the Junge Union Nordfriesland in 2011. From 2014 he was district chairman of the Junge Union Nordfriesland. He held this office until 2023. He has been honorary chairman of the JU district association since 2023.

Since the 2018 Schleswig-Holstein local elections, Bodin has been a member of the North Frisian district council for his hometown of Leck . In the 2023 Schleswig-Holstein local elections, Bodin was again directly elected to the district council. There he is currently the 1st deputy parliamentary group leader of the CDU and chairman of the main committee.

Bodin has been district chairman of the CDU Nordfriesland since February 2024. He succeeded Astrid Damerow, who did not run for re-election as district chairman. In the 2025 German federal election, he succeeded Damerow as direct candidate in the Nordfriesland – Dithmarschen Nord constituency, receiving 32.7% of the vote.
