= Georg Kippels =

German politician

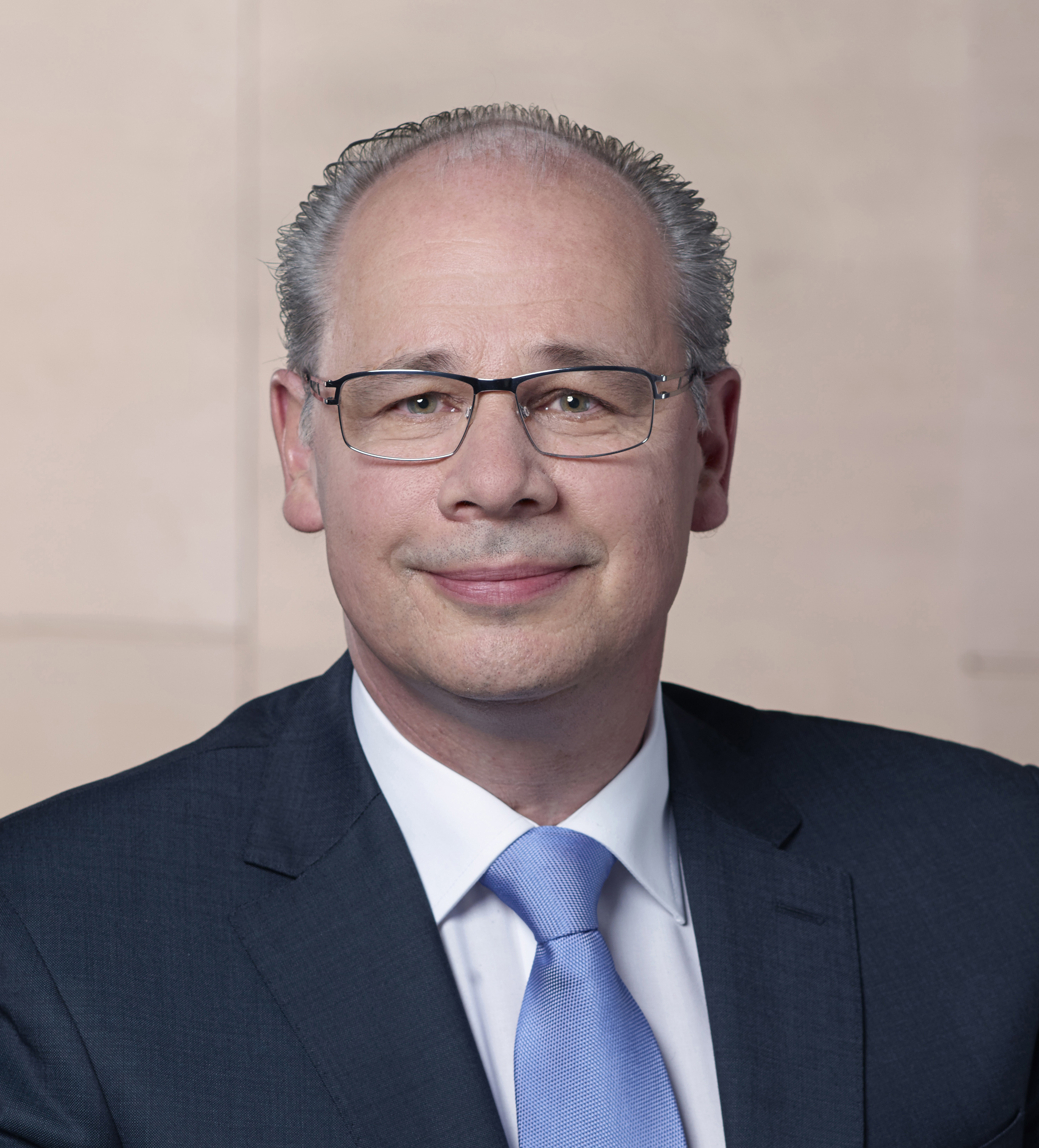
- Georg Kippels in 2013

Member of the Bundestag
- Incumbent
- Assumed office 2013
- Preceded by: Willi Zylajew

Personal details
- Born: 21 September 1959 (age 67) Bedburg, West Germany (now Germany)
- Party: CDU
- Education: University of Cologne

Georg Kippels (born 21 September 1959) is a German lawyer and politician of the Christian Democratic Union (CDU) who has been serving as a member of the Bundestag from the state of North Rhine-Westphalia since 2013.

In addition to his work in parliament, Kippels has been serving as a Parliamentary State Secretary at the German Ministry of Health in the government of Chancellor Friedrich Merz since 2025.

== Political career ==
Kippels first became a member of the Bundestag in the 2013 German federal election. From 2013 to 2025, he served on the Health Committee on Health and the Committee on Economic Cooperation and Development. In 2018, he also joined the newly established Sub-Committee on Global Health.

In addition to his committee assignments, Kippels serves as the deputy chairman of the German-Mexican Parliamentary Friendship Group.

== Other activities ==
- German Network against Neglected Tropical Diseases (DNTDs), Member of the Parliamentary Advisory Board (since 2018)
- German Health Partnership (GHP), Member of the Advisory Board (since 2017)
- "End Polio Now", Chairman of the Parliamentary Advisory Board (2018–2022)
- German Foundation for World Population (DSW), Member of the Parliamentary Advisory Board
- German Red Cross (DRK), Member
- Lions Clubs International, Member

== Political positions ==
In June 2017, Kippels voted against Germany's introduction of same-sex marriage.
