= Hermann Glüsing =

German politician (1908–1981)

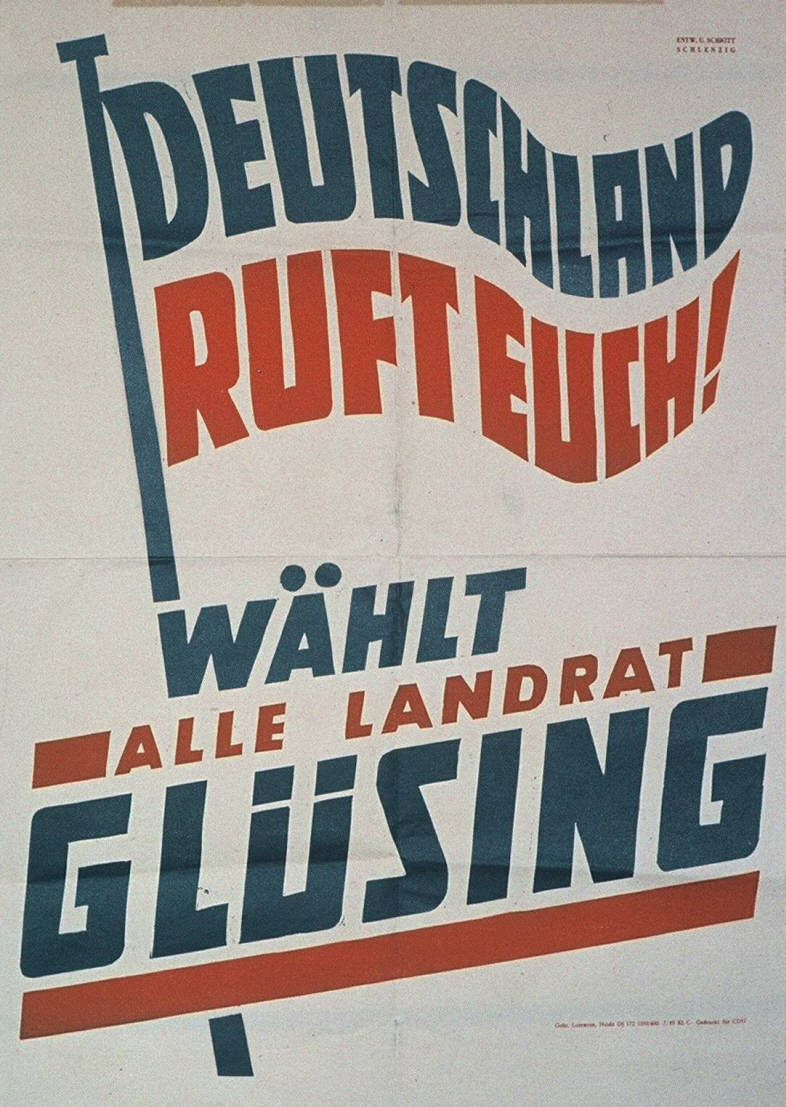
- Candidate poster of Hermann Glüsings for the federal election 1949

Member of the Bundestag
- In office 7 September 1949 – 22 September 1972

Personal details
- Born: 27 October 1908 Wrohm
- Died: 25 September 1981 (aged 72) Wrohm, Schleswig-Holstein, Germany
- Party: CDU

Hermann Glüsing (October 27, 1908 – September 25, 1981) was a German politician of the Christian Democratic Union (CDU) and member of the German Bundestag.

== Life ==
From 1945 he was a member of the CDU. Hermann Glüsing was a member of the German Bundestag from 1949 to 1972. He was always a directly elected member of parliament for the constituency of Nordfriesland – Dithmarschen Nord and, from 1965, after the reorganization of the constituencies of Schleswig-Holstein, for the constituency of Husum.

== Literature ==
Herbst, Ludolf; Jahn, Bruno (2002). Vierhaus, Rudolf (ed.). Biographisches Handbuch der Mitglieder des Deutschen Bundestages. 1949–2002 [Biographical Handbook of the Members of the German Bundestag. 1949–2002] (in German). München: De Gruyter - De Gruyter Saur. p. 1715. ISBN 978-3-11-184511-1.
