= Ludwig Hamm =

German politician

Member of the Bundestag
- In office 17 October 1961 – 12 May 1966

Personal details
- Born: 6 December 1921 Kaiserslautern
- Died: 20 November 1999 (aged 77)
- Party: FDP

Ludwig Hamm (December 6, 1921 – November 20, 1999) was a German politician of the Free Democratic Party (FDP) and former member of the German Bundestag.

== Life ==
Hamm had been a member of the city council of Kaiserslautern since 1956 and was chairman of the FDP faction there. After he had been unsuccessful in the 1957 Bundestag elections, he entered the German Bundestag in the 1961 (second place) and 1965 (first place) Bundestag elections via the state list of the Rhineland-Palatinate FDP and was a member of parliament from the beginning of the fourth term on 17 October 1961 until he resigned on 12 May 1966. During the 4th legislative period (1961 to 1965) he was chairman of the committee for health care.

== Literature ==
Herbst, Ludolf; Jahn, Bruno (2002). Vierhaus, Rudolf (ed.). Biographisches Handbuch der Mitglieder des Deutschen Bundestages. 1949–2002 [Biographical Handbook of the Members of the German Bundestag. 1949–2002] (in German). München: De Gruyter - De Gruyter Saur. p. 1715. ISBN 978-3-11-184511-1.
