= Otto Effertz =

German economist

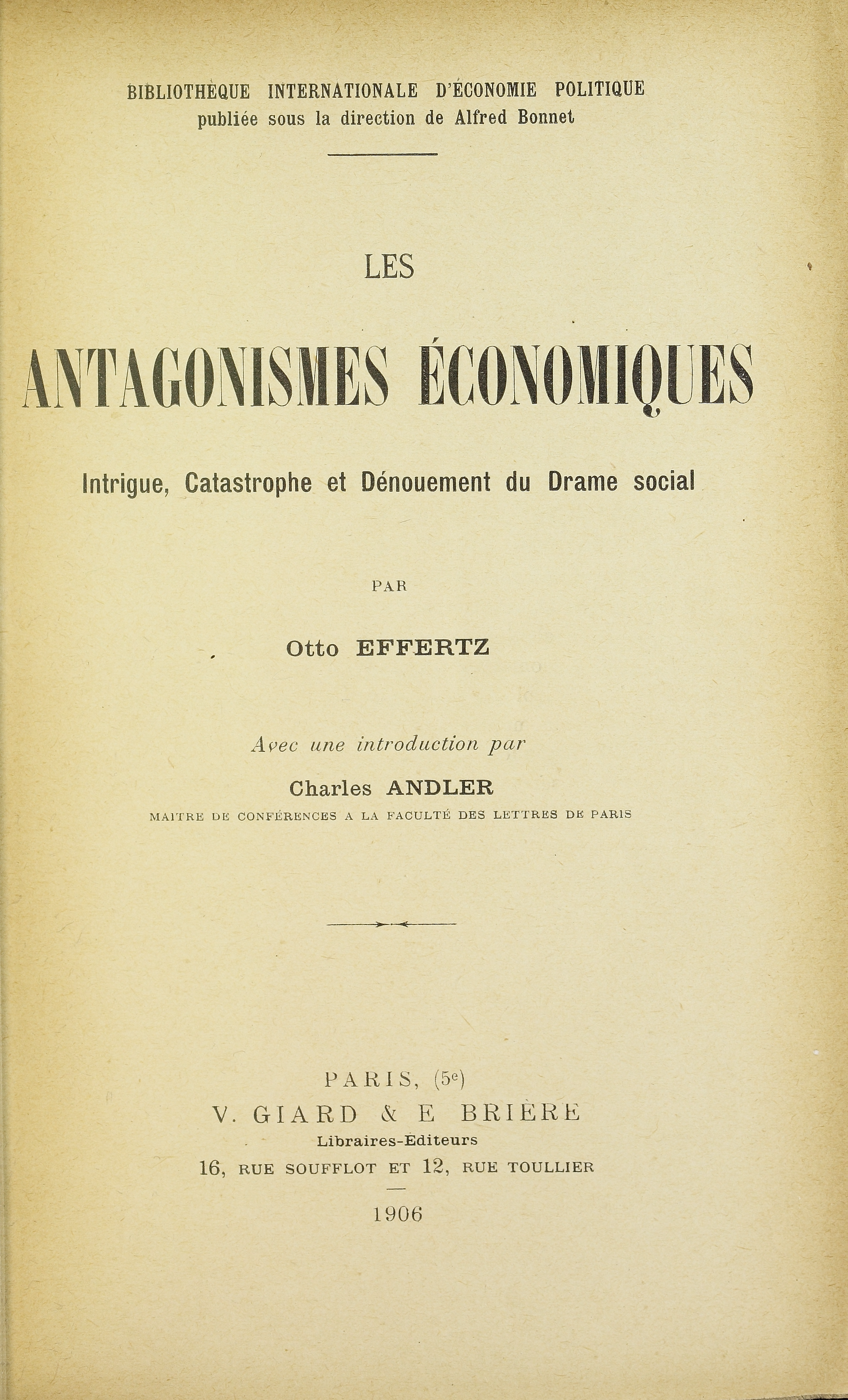
Les Antagonismes économiques, 1906

Otto Effertz (6 January 1856 – 18 November 1921) was a German economist.

== Life ==
Born in 1856 from a German father and a Dutch mother, he graduated in medicine, but later engaged in economics studies, without obtaining academic titles in Germany.

He then moved to France, where he published many of his works. After moving to Mexico, he studied mathematics, returning to Germany in 1912. He was again in France in 1913, where he held some lessons thanks to the support of Charles Gide, Adolphe Landry and the Revue socialiste.

Kept prisoner at the beginning of World War I by the French, he was released only at the end of the conflict. He spent his last years in Düsseldorf, where he died in 1921.

He elaborated his own form of socialism, in which he wanted to take into account that goods do not take their value only from work but also from land.

== Works ==
- Travail et terre. Nouveau système d'économie politique (1893)
- Studien uber Hysterie, Hypnotismus, Suggestion (1894)
- Arbeit und Boden. System der politischen Oekonomie (1889–1891)
- A criticism of Darwinism (1894)
- L'immunite hereditaire. Etude de patologie compare de generations et de races en stile lapidaire (1904?)
- Les conflits sociaux ou travail et terre. Nouveau systeme d'economie politique (1905)
- Les antagonismes économiques. Intrigue, catastrophe et dénouement du drame social (Bibliothèque internationale d'économie politique ed.). Paris: Giard & Brière. 1906.
- Le principe ponophysiocratique et son application a la question sociale. Lecon d'ouverture faite a la Faculte de droit de l'Universite de Paris (1913).
