= Josef Stingl =

German politician

- Born: 19 March 1919; Maria Kulm, Czechoslovakia
- Died: 19 March 2004 (aged 85); Leutesdorf (Neuwied), Rhineland-Palatinate, Germany
- Occupations: Fighter pilot Construction worker Politician; President of the BA
- Spouse(s): 1. Dorothea Behmke; (who predeceased him); 2. ______
- Children: 2
- Parent(s): Georg Stigl; Amalie Hüttl

Josef Stingl (19 March 1919 – 19 March 2004) was a German politician who served as the longstanding president of the Bundesanstalt für Arbeit (West German [National] Employment Agency) from 1968 to 1984. By that time he had already established himself as a national politician as a member of the CDU and, after he relocated to Munich, the CSU). From 1953 to 1968, he served as a member of the Bundestag (West German parliament). There, he took a particular interest in pensions and labour law.

== Life ==
=== Provenance and early years ===
Stingl was born in Maria Kulm, Czechoslovakia (today Chlum Svaté Maří in the Czech Republic), which is where he grew up in a Catholic family. Georg Stingl, his father, was a master baker, who died in 1933, as a result of which the latter part of Josef's childhood was spent in relative poverty. The frontier changes mandated in 1919 meant that as an infant he became a member of the ethnically German minority in Czechoslovakia. He attended secondary school in Cheb, passing his school finals with high marks in 1938. 1938 was also the year in which the Sudetenland (as his home region had come to be known to German-speakers over the previous couple of decades) was annexed by Nazi Germany.

=== War years ===
In December 1938 Stingl was conscripted as a "Fahnenjunker" (loosely, "trainee officer"), working on anti-aircraft operations. During the Second World War he served in the Luftwaffe (German air force), becoming a spotter, a pilot and, by the time of his capture in 1945, an Oberleutnant (senior lieutenant officer). He ended the war with more than 200 missions flown. Sources keen to reconcile his military service on behalf of Hitler's Germany with the increasingly horrendous atrocities for which the regime was responsible stress that for Stingl, as a good catholic boy, military service to the fatherland would have been an obligation of honour even if he was critical of the regime. The pacifist's concept of a "duty to desert" (widely followed by sympathizers with the - since 1933 illegal - Communist Party) would have been unthinkable. By the time war ended Stingl was being held by the English in Schleswig-Holstein as a prisoner of war. He was released relatively soon however. By the end of 1945 he had been forced by the ethnic cleansing of those times to leave his home region: with his young family he relocated to Berlin.

Joseph Stingl married Dorothea Behmke in 1943: the marriage produced two recorded children.

=== New beginnings in Berlin ===
With much of the German capital reduced to rubble, as the rubble was cleared there was no shortage of building work, and it was as a building worker that Stingl initially supported his family. In 1947 he switched to a management/administrative position with a building business. Between 1948 and 1952 he was employed by a major home-building firm. His earnings were high enough for him to be able to fund university level studies through evening classes. As a former military officer (from the Nazi period) he was not permitted access to Berlin university (which was in the Soviet occupation zone. He studied, instead, in the American zone, at the recently relaunched and renamed "Otto Suhr Institute", emerging from his studies in 1951 with a degree in Political Sciences. The degree course culminated with a dissertation. Stingl's dissertation was entitled "Die Entwicklung einer 'pressure group' in der deutschen Beamterschaft" (loosely, "The development of a 'pressure group' in the German public service"). He stayed on as a research assistant for a couple of terms after graduating. Later, between 1955 and 1971, he held a teaching contract in Political Sciences at the "Otto Suhr Institute", which in 1959 had been integrated into the US-backed Free University of Berlin. In addition, between 1952 and 1968, he held a side-appointment as an advisor on Social Policy to the Berlin-based "West German Chamber of Industry and Commerce ("Industrie- und Handelskammer" / IHK).

=== Politics ===
Josef Stingl joined the new CDU (party) in 1947. There was a widespread belief that populist nationalists had been able to take power in 1933 because of political divisions between the (mostly) more moderate parties of the political left and right. Launched in 1945, the CDU was a coming together of political groupings of the centre and moderate right which was intended to reduce the risk of any future power grab by extremists. Stingl rose through the party hierarchy, becoming deputy chair of the local party executive in Berlin-Reinickendorf in 1951 and a member of the regional party executive for Berlin in 1952, of which he became regional deputy chair in 1956. Further promotions through the party hierarchy continued, but after 1953 Stingl's political impact was based more directly on his role as a member of the Bundestag (West German parliament).

Within the party Stingl was always seen as representative of the party's "workers' wing", reflecting his background as the son of an artisan and as a man who had only been able to obtain a university degree by earning money by day and studying in the evenings. He would always be a proponent of social equality.

=== Bundestag ===
Josef Stingl was elected a member of the West German Bundestag in September 1953 as one 22 members representing the territory becoming known as West Berlin. 6 of the 22 represented the CDU. He remained a Bundestag member without a break till 1968. Because of the complexities introduced by the semi-detached constitutional relationship between West Berlain and West Germany, there were, before 1990, no directly elected Bundestag members from Berlin. Stingl and his five party colleagues were accordingly electred because their names appeared on the party list for Berlin and then secured sufficient votes to earn the right (in 1953) for the top six candidates on the party list to be elected. Stingl was included on the candidate list in the expectation that he would contribute on the party's behalf, primarily, on matters of social policy. His fellow Berlin member, Ernst Schellenberg of the Social Democratic Party (SPD) had already made a name for himself in respect of the same set of issues, and Stingl, on his election, succeeded in ensuring that social policy did not remain an SPD monopoly. Representing Berlin meant Stingl did not enjoy full voting rights in the West German Bundestag, but he nevertheless made 154 contributions in the parliament's plenary sessions, and he was not without influence, rapidly establishing himself as one of the CDU's leading experts on social policy.

In 1957 Stingl formally became a member of the parliamentary executive of the CDU/CSU group in the Bundestag, having by this time already attended a number of its meetings "by invitation". He was also a full (or in some cases alternating) member of various parliamentary committees. At the start of 1966 he became deputy chair of the parliamentary committee on social policy. Within the parliamentary group, between 1962 and his resignation from the Bundestag in 1968, he chaired the CDU/CSU working group on Social Policy ("Arbeitskreis IV"). He continued to be closely involved in party policy making on these matters, notably in respect of pension reforms, even after 1968.

=== Bundesanstalt für Arbeit ===
Between 2 May 1968 and 30 March 1984 Josef Stingl served as president of the Bundesanstalt für Arbeit (West German [National] Employment Agency ). (Note: subsequently reconfigured and rebranded as the "Bundesagentur für Arbeit") During his tenure the organisation's national head office in Nuremberg was built and many of the smaller local "Arbeitsamt" offices were merged. It was a reflection of the length of his tenure that during the 1970s the expression "Ich arbeite bei Firma Stingl" ("I work for the Stingl company") became used as an ironic euphemism for "Ich bin arbeitslos" ("I am unemployed"). At a time when "media political correctness" was not yet ubiquitous, Josef Stingl, who was a more than averagely rotund gentleman, was also referred to as "der Bundesunke" (loosely, "the national toad") in reference to his monthly media appearances to announce the deteriorating West German unemployment statistics.

=== Away from the frontline ===
Between 1983 and 1990 Stingl took a post as an honorary (though apparently not entirely inactive) professor at the University of Bamberg where he was assigned to the department of "professional further education" ("Berufliche Weiterbildung"). He did not go quietly into retirement. Instead he increased his involvement with the church and established himself as a leading spokesman for the victims (and their families) of ethnic cleansing from the "Sudetenland" during 1944/45. He was committed to dialogue and reconciliation between the descendants of the (former) Sudeten Germans and of the Czechs who had taken their place in those territories.

After the death of his first wife Josef Stingl remarried and moved to Leutesdorf (downriver from Koblenz). During his final years he suffered from serious heart disease. He died at Leutesdorf on his eighty-fifth birthday.

== Awards and honours ==
- 1942: Honour Goblet of the Air Force
- 1943: German Cross in Gold
- 1971: Bavarian Order of Merit
- 1972: Order of Merit of the Italian Republic ("Grande Ufficiale")
- 1974: Order of St. Gregory the Great ("Commendatore con placca")
- 1974: Order of Merit of the Federal Republic of Germany Grand Cross
- 1976: Honorary senator: University of Mannheim
- 1979: Honorary doctor: German University of Administrative Sciences, Speyer
- 1974: Order of Merit of the Federal Republic of Germany Grand Cross with star
- 1982: Bavarian State Medal for Social Services
- 1984: Bishop Heinrich Braun prize
- 1984: Order of Merit of the Federal Republic of Germany Grand Cross with star and shoulder sash
- 1984: Order of St. Gregory the Great ("Cavaliere di gran croce")
- 1984: European Karl's Prize of the Sudeten Homeland Society
