= Paul Gibbert =

German politician (1898–1967)

Member of the Bundestag
- In office 7 September 1949 – 30 December 1967

Personal details
- Born: 26 November 1898 Moselkern
- Died: 30 December 1967 (aged 69) Moselkern, Rhineland-Palatinate, Germany
- Party: CDU

Paul Gibbert (November 26, 1898 – December 30, 1967) was a German politician of the Christian Democratic Union (CDU) and former member of the German Bundestag.

== Life ==
After the end of the Second World War, he participated in the founding of the CDU in Rhineland-Palatinate in 1945. Gibbert was a member of the Consultative State Assembly from 1946 to 1947 and then a member of the Rhineland-Palatinate State Parliament until 1951. He was a member of the German Bundestag from its first election in 1949 until his death. There he represented, always directly elected, the constituency of Cochem.

== Literature ==
Herbst, Ludolf; Jahn, Bruno (2002). Vierhaus, Rudolf (ed.). Biographisches Handbuch der Mitglieder des Deutschen Bundestages. 1949–2002 [Biographical Handbook of the Members of the German Bundestag. 1949–2002] (in German). München: De Gruyter - De Gruyter Saur. p. 1715. ISBN 978-3-11-184511-1.
