= Wendelin Enders =

German politician (1922–2019)

Member of the Bundestag
- In office 9 May 1967 – 18 February 1987
- Preceded by: Edwin Zerbe
- Succeeded by: Multi-member district
- Constituency: Hersfeld (1967–1983); State list (1983–1987)

Personal details
- Born: 20 October 1922 Hofbieber, Germany
- Died: 23 April 2019 (aged 96) Petersberg, Hesse, Germany
- Party: Social Democratic
- Children: 3
- Education: University of Göttingen; Marburg University

Wendelin Enders (20 October 1922 – 23 April 2019) was a German politician who served as an MP for the SPD.
