= Karl-Hans Kern =

German politician

Member of the Bundestag
- In office 1967–1976

Personal details
- Born: 3 October 1932 Stuttgart, Germany
- Died: 21 May 2014 (aged 81) Heilbronn, Germany
- Party: SPD
- Spouse(s): Ute Dorothee Velthusen (m. 1959, div.), Sigrun Bartling (m. 1984)
- Education: University of Tübingen; University of Göttingen
- Occupation: Politician
- Profession: Theologian

Karl-Hans Kern (3 October 1932 – 21 May 2014) was a German politician (SPD) and member of the Bundestag from 1967 until 1976.

Kern also served as a delegate for Germany at the United Nations General Assembly.
