= Kurt Jung =

German politician and architect

Kurt Jung (15 February 1925 – 23 April 1989) was a German politician (FDP) and architect. He was Parliamentary State Secretary to the Federal Minister of the Interior from 1972 to 1974, to the Federal Ministry of Transport and Posts and Telecommunications from 1974 to 1976 and to the Federal Minister of Defence from 1982 to 1983.

== Life ==
Jung was born in Kandel in 1925. After graduating from secondary school in 1943 at the Oberrealschule in Landau in the Palatinate, he was called up for the Reich Labor Service. From 1943 to 1945, he was a pilot in the Luftwaffe, his last position being that of a senior midshipman. In 1945, he was wounded near Eberswalde. Later, he was taken over into the Bundeswehr and was promoted to the rank of a lieutenant colonel in the reserve. After his captivity as a prisoner of war he again passed his school leaving examination in 1946 and studied architecture at the Technical University of Karlsruhe. In 1951, he became an architect and graduated with a degree in engineering. From 1951 to 1953, he worked in the building administration and as a freelance architect. From 1978 to 1981, he was a member of the advisory board of the Friedrich Naumann Foundation. He was also chairman of the Rhineland-Palatinate regional association of the Association of German Architects.

On 17 May 1966, Jung moved into the German Bundestag to replace Ludwig Hamm, who had resigned, and remained a member of the German Bundestag until 1983. He was deputy chairman of the FDP parliamentary group in the Bundestag from 1976 to 1979 and chairman of the parliamentary working group on Europe from 1980 to 1982. Jung always entered the Bundestag via the Rhineland-Palatinate state list. From 1977 to 1979 Jung was also a member of the European Parliament.

== Public offices ==
Jung was a member of the city council in Kandel and the district council from 1960 to 1966. Until 1966, he was chairman of the FDP district assembly fraction and from 1963 to 1972 of the district association Vorderpfalz. From 1970 to 1974 he was a member of the FDP federal executive committee and from 1972 to 1974 state chairman of the FDP Rhineland-Palatinate. On 15 December 1972, he was appointed Parliamentary State Secretary to the Federal Minister of the Interior in the Federal Government led by Chancellor Willy Brandt. Following the resignation of Willy Brandt and the subsequent election of Helmut Schmidt as Federal Chancellor, Jung moved to the Federal Ministry of Transport and Posts and Telecommunications on 16 May 1974. After the 1976 federal elections, he left the government on 14 December 1976.

Following the election of Helmut Kohl, Jung was appointed Parliamentary State Secretary to the Federal Minister of Defense on 4 October 1982, but left office on 29 March 1983, after the 1983 federal elections, and died in Karlsruhe in 1989.

Documents about Jung's professional activities can be found in the Archive of Liberalism of the Friedrich Naumann Foundation for Freedom in Gummersbach.
