= Ingbert Liebing =

German lobbyist and former politician

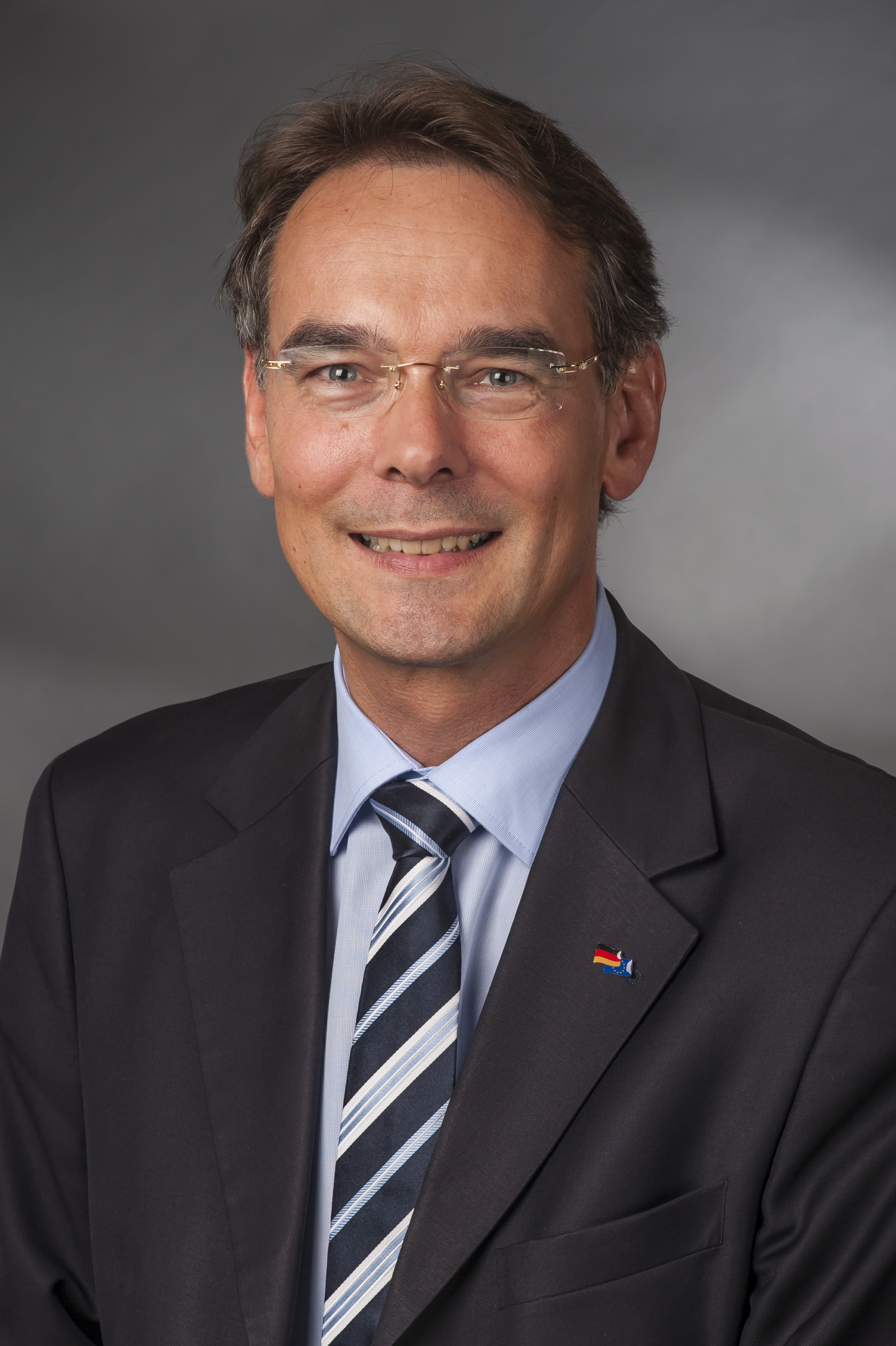

Member of the Bundestag
- In office 2005–2017

Personal details
- Born: 11 May 1963 (age 63) Flensburg, West Germany (now Germany)
- Citizenship: German
- Party: CDU
- Children: 2
- Education: University of Kiel

Ingbert Liebing (born 11 May 1963) is a German lobbyist and former politician of the Christian Democratic Union (CDU). He served as a member of the Bundestag from 2005 until 2017, where he represented Nordfriesland – Dithmarschen Nord. From 2014 until 2017, he was the chairman of the CDU state party group of Schleswig-Holstein.

== Political career ==
=== Member of the German Bundestag, 2005-2017 ===
Liebing first became a member of the German Bundestag in the 2005 national elections. Between 2005 and 2013, he served on the Committee on the Environment, Nature Conservation, Building and Nuclear Safety as well as on the Committee on Tourism. On the environment committee, he was his parliamentary group's rapporteur on marine conservation. In addition, he was the deputy chairman of the German delegation to the Baltic Sea Parliamentary Conference (BSPC) from 2005 to 2009.

From 2009, Liebing was a member of the Sub-Committee on Municipal Policy, serving as the committee’s deputy chairman between 2009 and 2013. He also served on the Committee on Economic Affairs and Energy. In 2013, he was elected as chairman of the Regional Government Association of the CDU/CSU (KPV).

In the negotiations to form a Grand Coalition of Chancellor Angela Merkel's Christian Democrats (CDU together with the Bavarian CSU) and the Social Democrats (SPD) following the 2013 federal elections, Liebing was part of the CDU/CSU delegation in the working group on energy policy, led by Peter Altmaier and Hannelore Kraft.

On 11 June 2016, Liebing was elected leading candidate for the Schleswig-Holstein state elections in May 2017. He received 91.86 percent of the delegates' votes. Later that year, he resigned from that role after consistently bad polling results.

=== Career in state politics ===
Following the state elections, Liebing resigned from the Bundestag and took up the office of State Secretary in the government of Minister-President Daniel Günther. In this capacity, he represented the state government at the Bundesrat. He was also a substitute member of the German-French Friendship Group set up by the Bundesrat and the French Senate as well as of the German-Russian Friendship Group set up in cooperation with the Russian Federation Council.

== Life after politics ==
In 2020, Liebing was appointed Chief Executive Officer of the German Association of Local Utilities (VKU), succeeding Katherina Reiche.

== Other activities ==
- Energy and Climate Policy and Innovation Council (EPICO), Member of the Advisory Board (since 2021)
- Fachhochschule Westküste, Member of the University Council
- European Centre for Minority Issues (ECMI), Member of the Board (2009-2013)
- Schleswig-Holstein Tourism Association (TVSH), Deputy Chairman (2004-2005)
