= Otto Eisenmann =

German politician

Member of the Bundestag
- In office 15 October 1957 – 1 June 1967

Personal details
- Born: 26 February 1913 Alpirsbach
- Died: 19 February 2002 (aged 88)
- Party: FDP

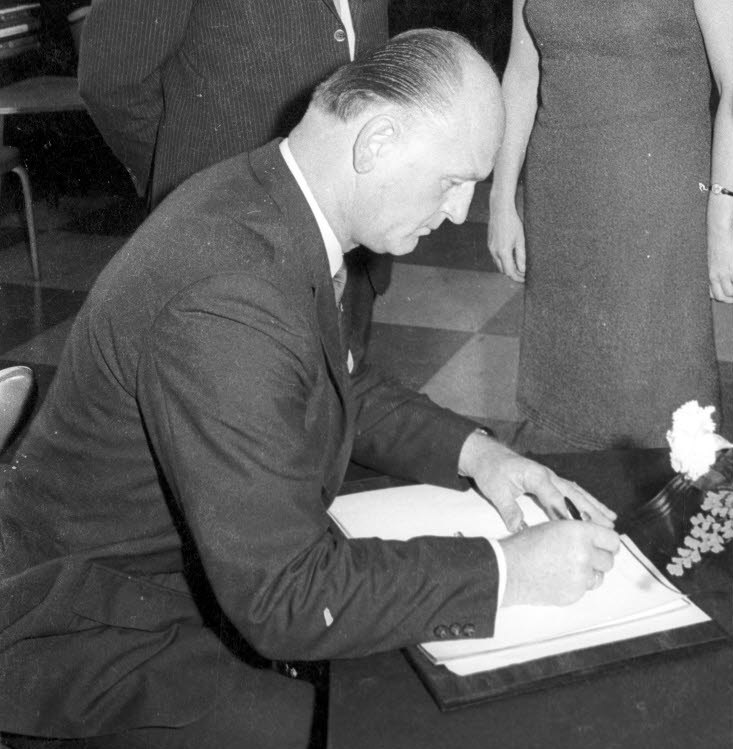
Otto Eisenmann

Otto Eisenmann (26 February 1913 – 19 February 2002) was a German politician of the Free Democratic Party (FDP) and former member of the German Bundestag.

== Life ==
From 1954 to 26 October 1957 Eisenmann was a member of the Landtag in Schleswig-Holstein; he had been elected to the Land parliament via the list of the electoral alliance of the Schleswig-Holstein bloc, which the DP had formed with the Schleswig-Holstein Community. From 1957 to 1 June 1967 he was a member of the German Bundestag. From 1967 to 20 January 1968 he was again a member of the state parliament in Schleswig-Holstein.

== Literature ==
Herbst, Ludolf; Jahn, Bruno (2002). Vierhaus, Rudolf (ed.). Biographisches Handbuch der Mitglieder des Deutschen Bundestages. 1949–2002 [Biographical Handbook of the Members of the German Bundestag. 1949–2002] (in German). München: De Gruyter - De Gruyter Saur. p. 1715. ISBN 978-3-11-184511-1.
