= Richard Jaeger =

German politician (1913–1998)

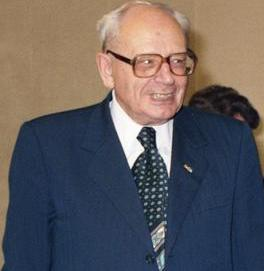
- Jaeger in 1988

Vice President of the Bundestag (on proposal of the CDU/CSU group)
- In office 11 May 1967 – 14 December 1976
- President: Eugen Gerstenmaier; Kai-Uwe von Hassel; Annemarie Renger
- Preceded by: Maria Probst
- Succeeded by: Richard Stücklen
- In office 6 September 1953 – 26 October 1965
- President: Hermann Ehlers; Eugen Gerstenmaier
- Preceded by: Position established
- Succeeded by: Maria Probst

Minister of Justice
- In office 26 October 1965 – 1 December 1966
- Chancellor: Ludwig Erhard
- Preceded by: Karl Weber
- Succeeded by: Gustav Heinemann

Member of the Bundestag; for Fürstenfeldbruck
- In office 7 September 1949 – 4 November 1980
- Preceded by: Constituency established
- Succeeded by: Eicke Götz

Personal details
- Born: 16 February 1913 Schöneberg, Germany
- Died: 15 May 1988 (aged 75) Bonn, West Germany
- Party: Christian Social Union
- Children: 6
- Education: LMU Munich

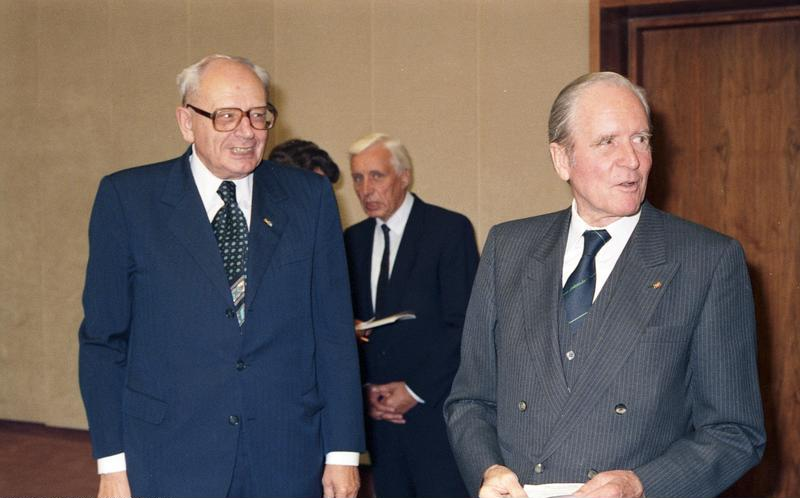
Richard Jaeger (left) and the former German President Karl Carstens (right)

Richard Jaeger (16 February 1913 – 15 May 1998) was a German politician of the Christian Social Union of Bavaria. Under Ludwig Erhard's second ministry, he was Minister of Justice (26 October 1965 – 1 December 1966).

From 1933, Jaeger was a member of Hitler's paramilitary organization, the Sturmabteilung (SA), and was a member of the Wehrmacht from 1939 to 1945. From 1949 to 1980 Jaeger was a member of German Bundestag. He prominently supported the reintroduction of the death penalty in the 1960s, despite in the 1950s rallying against it and advocating for pardoning Nazi war criminals sentenced to death. From 1972 to 1974, Jaeger was President of the European Documentation and Information Centre (CEDI).

He was also President of the German Atlantic Society from 1957 to 1990 and Head of the German Delegation to the UNCHR from 1984 to 1990. He was married and had six children.
