= Maria Probst =

German politician

Vice President of the Bundestag (on proposal of the CDU/CSU group)
- In office 9 December 1965 – 1 May 1967
- President: Eugen Gerstenmaier
- Preceded by: Richard Jaeger
- Succeeded by: Richard Jaeger

Member of the Bundestag; for Karlstadt
- In office 7 September 1949 – 1 May 1967
- Preceded by: Constituency established
- Succeeded by: Franz Xaver Geisenhofer

Member of the Landtag of Bavaria; for Lower Franconia
- In office 16 December 1946 – 1 September 1949
- Preceded by: Multi-member district
- Succeeded by: Karl Haaf

Personal details
- Born: Maria Mayer; 1 July 1902 Munich, Germany
- Died: 1 May 1967 (aged 64) Munich, West Germany
- Party: Christian Social Union
- Spouse: Alfons Probst (died 1945)
- Children: 2
- Education: University of Freiburg; University of Zurich; LMU Munich

Maria Probst (1 July 1902 – 1 May 1967) was a German politician of the Christian Social Union in Bavaria.

== Biography ==
Daughter of the diplomat Dr Wilhelm Mayer, Maria Probst studied German and history for her doctorate, which she earned in 1930. She had two daughters of her own from her marriage to Dr Alphonse Probst, who was killed towards the end of the Second World War. After the war, she worked as a teacher in Hammelburg.

She joined the Christian Social Union of Bavaria (CSU) as a member of the Bavarian Landtag in 1946. She was a member of the Bundestag from its inception in 1949, representing the Karlstadt constituency. From 1 October 1952 until 26 June 1953, she led the Parlamentarischen Untersuchungsausschuss zur Prüfung der unzulänglichen Einstellungen von Schwerbeschädigten bei den Bundesdienststellen (roughly, "Parliamentary Committee of Inquiry to Examine Demoralisation in Heavily Damaged Areas in the Federal Departments"). From 1957 to 1965, she was Deputy Chairman of the Bundestagsausschuss für Kriegsopfer- und Heimkehrerfragen (roughly, "Committee for Questions of War Victims and Returnees"). From 9 December 1965 until her death, she was the first woman to occupy the Vice-president's office in the Bundestag. On 10 May 1967, the Bundestag officially mourned her.

In 1961, she was one of a number of politicians behind an unsuccessful attempt to introduce an Act on academic freedom.

From 27 February 1958 until 21 December 1965, she was also a member of the European Parliament.

== Honours ==
On 3 July 1959, she was awarded the Bavarian Order of Merit. At least ten Frankish communities appointed her an honorary citizen, and a hall, a school, a college and a senior citizens' home were named after her.

== Sources ==
- Biography
- This page was translated from de:Maria Probst in the German Wikipedia on 25 March 2008
