= Denise Loop =

German politician (born 1994)

Member of the Bundestag
- Incumbent
- Assumed office 26 October 2021

Personal details
- Born: 19 May 1994 (age 31) Itzehoe, Germany
- Party: Alliance 90/The Greens

Denise Loop (born 19 May 1994) is a German politician. Loop became a member of the Bundestag in the 2021 German federal election. She is affiliated with the Alliance 90/The Greens party.

She became a member of the Green Youth organisation (Grüne Jugend) in 2010. She became a member of the Alliance 90/The Greens party in 2016.
