= Josef Effertz =

German politician (1907–1984)

Member of the Bundestag
- In office 17 October 1961 – 4 March 1968

Personal details
- Born: 29 March 1907 Fliesteden, Germany
- Died: 31 May 1984 (aged 77)
- Party: FDP

Josef Effertz (29 March 1907 – 31 May 1984) was a German politician of the Free Democratic Party (FDP) and former member of the German Bundestag.

== Life ==
From 1954 until his resignation on 26 September 1961, Effertz was a member of the North Rhine-Westphalian state parliament. He was a member of the German Bundestag from 1961 until his resignation on 4 March 1968. He had entered parliament in both legislative periods via the North Rhine-Westphalia state list.

== Literature ==
Herbst, Ludolf; Jahn, Bruno (2002). Vierhaus, Rudolf (ed.). Biographisches Handbuch der Mitglieder des Deutschen Bundestages. 1949–2002 [Biographical Handbook of the Members of the German Bundestag. 1949–2002] (in German). München: De Gruyter - De Gruyter Saur. p. 1715. ISBN 978-3-11-184511-1.
