= Rudi Adams =

German politician (1919–2013)

Member of the Bundestag
- In office 8 December 1966 – 4 November 1980

Member of the European Parliament
- In office 1970–1979

Personal details
- Born: 10 November 1919 Masburg
- Died: 25 May 2013 (aged 101)
- Party: Social Democratic

Rudi Adams (November 10, 1919 – May 25, 2013) was a German politician of the Social Democratic Party (SPD) and former member of the German Bundestag.

== Life ==
Adams joined the SPD in 1948. Rudi Adams entered the Bundestag in 1966 via the state list of North Rhine-Westphalia and thereafter always as a directly elected member of parliament for the constituency of Cologne-Land. From 1970 to 1979 Adams was also a member of the European Parliament, of which he was vice-president from 1977 until his retirement in 1979.

== Literature ==
- Herbst, Ludolf; Jahn, Bruno (2002). Vierhaus, Rudolf (ed.). Biographisches Handbuch der Mitglieder des Deutschen Bundestages. 1949–2002 [Biographical Handbook of the Members of the German Bundestag. 1949–2002] (in German). München: De Gruyter - De Gruyter Saur. p. 1715. ISBN 978-3-11-184511-1.
