= List of members of the 10th Bundestag =

This is a list of members of the 10th Bundestag – the lower house of parliament of the Federal Republic of Germany, whose members were in office from 1983 until 1987.

== Summary ==
This summary includes changes in the numbers of the four caucuses (CDU/CSU, SPD, Greens, FDP):

| Time | Reason of change | CDU/CSU | SPD | FDP | Greens | Others | Total number |
|---|---|---|---|---|---|---|---|
| 1983 | First meeting | 244 | 193 | 34 | 27 | | 498 |
| 8 July 1983 | Franz Handlos leaves the CDU/CSU caucus and becomes unaffiliated | 243 | 193 | 34 | 27 | 1 | 498 |
| 28 October 1983 | Ekkehard Voigt leaves the CDU/CSU caucus and becomes unaffiliated | 242 | 193 | 34 | 27 | 2 | 498 |
| 10 February 1984 | Gert Bastian leaves the Greens caucus and becomes unaffiliated | 242 | 193 | 34 | 26 | 3 | 498 |
| 18 March 1986 | Gert Bastian becomes a member of the Greens again | 242 | 193 | 34 | 27 | 2 | 498 |
| 27 October 1986 | Karl-Arnold Eickmeyer leaves the SPD caucus and becomes unaffiliated | 242 | 192 | 34 | 27 | 3 | 498 |
| 2 December 1986 | Udo Tischer leaves the Greens caucus and becomes unaffiliated | 242 | 192 | 34 | 26 | 4 | 498 |

== Members ==
| State | No. | Constituency | Member | Party |
|---|---|---|---|---|
| Schleswig-Holstein | 1 | Flensburg – Schleswig | Harm Dallmeyer (Note: Harm Dallmeyer died on 11 April 1983.) | CDU |
| Schleswig-Holstein | 2 | Nordfriesland – Dithmarschen-Nord | Peter Harry Carstensen | CDU |
| Schleswig-Holstein | 3 | Steinburg – Dithmarschen-Süd | Dietrich Austermann | CDU |
| Schleswig-Holstein | 4 | Rendsburg-Eckernförde | Gerhard Stoltenberg | CDU |
| Schleswig-Holstein | 5 | Kiel | Norbert Gansel | SPD |
| Schleswig-Holstein | 6 | Plön – Neumünster | Karl Eigen | CDU |
| Schleswig-Holstein | 7 | Pinneberg | Ingrid Roitzsch | CDU |
| Schleswig-Holstein | 8 | Segeberg – Stormarn-Nord | Peter Kurt Würzbach | CDU |
| Schleswig-Holstein | 9 | Ostholstein | Rolf Olderog | CDU |
| Schleswig-Holstein | 10 | Herzogtum Lauenburg – Stormarn-Süd | Michael von Schmude | CDU |
| Schleswig-Holstein | 11 | Lübeck | Reinhold Hiller | SPD |
| Schleswig-Holstein | List | | Egon Bahr | SPD |
| Schleswig-Holstein | List | | Lieselott Blunck | SPD |
| Schleswig-Holstein | List | | Günther Heyenn | SPD |
| Schleswig-Holstein | List | | Günther Jansen | SPD |
| Schleswig-Holstein | List | | Horst Jungmann | SPD |
| Schleswig-Holstein | List | | Eckart Kuhlwein | SPD |
| Schleswig-Holstein | List | | Heide Simonis | SPD |
| Schleswig-Holstein | List | | Hans-Jürgen Stutzer | CDU |
| Schleswig-Holstein | List | | Wolfgang Saurin (Note: Wolfgang Saurin took office on 19 April 1983, to succeed Harm Dallmeyer.) | CDU |
| Schleswig-Holstein | List | | Uwe Ronneburger | FDP |
| Schleswig-Holstein | List | | Walter Sauermilch (Note: Walter Sauermilch resigned on 16 April 1985.) | Greens |
| Schleswig-Holstein | List | | Gerd Peter Werner (Note: Gerd Peter Werner took office on 16 April 1985, to succeed Walter Sauermilch.) | Greens |
| Hamburg | 12 | Hamburg-Mitte | Freimut Duve | SPD |
| Hamburg | 13 | Hamburg-Altona | Horst Gobrecht (Note: Horst Gobrecht resigned 29 June 1984.) | SPD |
| Hamburg | 14 | Hamburg-Eimsbüttel | Peter Paterna | SPD |
| Hamburg | 15 | Hamburg-Nord | Hans Apel | SPD |
| Hamburg | 16 | Hamburg-Wandsbek | Eugen Glombig | SPD |
| Hamburg | 17 | Hamburg-Bergedorf | Helmut Schmidt | SPD |
| Hamburg | 18 | Hamburg-Harburg | Hans-Ulrich Klose | SPD |
| Hamburg | List | | Jürgen Echternach | CDU |
| Hamburg | List | | Dirk Fischer | CDU |
| Hamburg | List | | Klaus Francke | CDU |
| Hamburg | List | | Volker Rühe | CDU |
| Hamburg | List | | Gunnar Uldall | CDU |
| Hamburg | List | | Jürgen Reents (Note: Jürgen Reents resigned on 19 March 1985.) | Greens |
| Hamburg | List | | Christian Schmidt (Note: Christian Schmidt took office on 22 March 1985, to succeed Jürgen Reents.) | Greens |
| Hamburg | List | | Uwe Hansen (Note: Uwe Hansen took office on 29 June 1984, to succeed Horst Gobrecht.) | SPD |
| Lower Saxony | 19 | Aurich – Emden | Carl Ewen | SPD |
| Lower Saxony | 20 | Unterems | Rudolf Seiters | CDU |
| Lower Saxony | 21 | Friesland – Wilhelmshaven | Herbert Ehrenberg | SPD |
| Lower Saxony | 22 | Oldenburg – Ammerland | Walter Polkehn | SPD |
| Lower Saxony | 23 | Delmenhorst – Wesermarsch | Margitta Terborg | SPD |
| Lower Saxony | 24 | Cuxhaven | Wolfgang von Geldern | CDU |
| Lower Saxony | 25 | Stade | Horst Eylmann | CDU |
| Lower Saxony | 26 | Mittelems | Hans-Gerd Strube | CDU |
| Lower Saxony | 27 | Cloppenburg – Vechta | Manfred Carstens | CDU |
| Lower Saxony | 28 | Diepholz | Walter Link | CDU |
| Lower Saxony | 29 | Verden | Martin Oldenstädt | CDU |
| Lower Saxony | 30 | Soltau – Rotenburg | Ingeborg Hoffmann | CDU |
| Lower Saxony | 31 | Lüneburg – Lüchow-Dannenberg | Horst Schröder (Note: Horst Schröder resigned on 22 March 1984.) | CDU |
| Lower Saxony | 32 | Osnabrück-Land | Reinhard von Schorlemer | CDU |
| Lower Saxony | 33 | Osnabrück | Karl-Heinz Hornhues | CDU |
| Lower Saxony | 34 | Nienburg – Schaumburg | Helmut Rode | CDU |
| Lower Saxony | 35 | Harburg | Herbert Helmrich | CDU |
| Lower Saxony | 36 | Stadt Hannover I | Egon Franke | SPD |
| Lower Saxony | 37 | Stadt Hannover II | Helmut Rohde | SPD |
| Lower Saxony | 38 | Hannover-Land I | Dietmar Kansy | CDU |
| Lower Saxony | 39 | Celle – Uelzen | Klaus-Jürgen Hedrich | CDU |
| Lower Saxony | 40 | Gifhorn – Peine | Engelbert Nelle | CDU |
| Lower Saxony | 41 | Hameln – Holzminden | Brigitte Traupe | SPD |
| Lower Saxony | 42 | Hannover-Land II | Herbert Lattmann | CDU |
| Lower Saxony | 43 | Hildesheim | Hermann Rappe | SPD |
| Lower Saxony | 44 | Salzgitter – Wolfenbüttel | Hans-Jürgen Junghans | SPD |
| Lower Saxony | 45 | Braunschweig | Joachim Clemens | CDU |
| Lower Saxony | 46 | Helmstedt – Wolfsburg | Volkmar Köhler | CDU |
| Lower Saxony | 47 | Goslar | Rudolf Sprung | CDU |
| Lower Saxony | 48 | Northeim – Osterode | Martin Schmidt | SPD |
| Lower Saxony | 49 | Göttingen | Hans Hugo Klein (Note: Hans Hugo Klein resigned on 20 December 1983.) | CDU |
| Lower Saxony | List | | Karl Ahrens | SPD |
| Lower Saxony | List | | Lothar Curdt | SPD |
| Lower Saxony | List | | Alfred Emmerlich | SPD |
| Lower Saxony | List | | Ingomar Hauchler | SPD |
| Lower Saxony | List | | Rudolf Hauck | SPD |
| Lower Saxony | List | | Ernst Kastning | SPD |
| Lower Saxony | List | | Günter Kiehm | SPD |
| Lower Saxony | List | | Klaus-Dieter Kühbacher | SPD |
| Lower Saxony | List | | Jürgen Linde | SPD |
| Lower Saxony | List | | Jan Oostergetelo | SPD |
| Lower Saxony | List | | Gerhard Schröder (Note: Gerhard Schröder resigned on 1 July 1986.) | SPD |
| Lower Saxony | List | | Wolfgang Schwenk | SPD |
| Lower Saxony | List | | Adolf Stockleben | SPD |
| Lower Saxony | List | | Peter Struck | SPD |
| Lower Saxony | List | | Günther Tietjen | SPD |
| Lower Saxony | List | | Peter Würtz | SPD |
| Lower Saxony | List | | Volker Neumann (Note: Volker Neumann took office on 11 November 1983, to succeed Jürgen Linde.) | SPD |
| Lower Saxony | List | | Karl-Arnold Eickmeyer (Note: Karl-Arnold Eickmeyer took office on 23 August 1985, to succeed Walter Polkehn.) | SPD |
| Lower Saxony | List | | Helmuth Möhring (Note: Helmuth Möhring took office on 8 July 1986, to succeed Gerhard Schröder.) | SPD |
| Lower Saxony | List | | Wilfried Bohlsen | CDU |
| Lower Saxony | List | | Werner Broll | CDU |
| Lower Saxony | List | | Heinrich Franke (Note: Heinrich Franke resigned on 9 April 1984.) | CDU |
| Lower Saxony | List | | Erich Maaß | CDU |
| Lower Saxony | List | | Hanna Neumeister | CDU |
| Lower Saxony | List | | Eberhard Pohlmann | CDU |
| Lower Saxony | List | | Helmut Sauer | CDU |
| Lower Saxony | List | | Ludolf von Wartenberg | CDU |
| Lower Saxony | List | | Hans-Peter Voigt (Note: Hans-Peter Voigt took office on 21 December 1983, to succeed Hans Hugo Klein.) | CDU |
| Lower Saxony | List | | Gertrud Dempwolf (Note: Gertrud Dempwolf took office on 22 March 1984, to succeed Horst Schröder.) | CDU |
| Lower Saxony | List | | Carl-Detlev Freiherr von Hammerstein (Note: Carl-Detlev Freiherr von Hammerstein took office on 9 April 1984, to succeed Heinrich Franke.) | CDU |
| Lower Saxony | List | | Günther Bredehorn | FDP |
| Lower Saxony | List | | Detlef Kleinert | FDP |
| Lower Saxony | List | | Friedrich Neuhausen | FDP |
| Lower Saxony | List | | Torsten Wolfgramm | FDP |
| Lower Saxony | List | | Erika Hickel (Note: Erika Hickel resigned on 9 March 1985.) | Greens |
| Lower Saxony | List | | Gert Jannsen (Note: Gert Jannsen resigned on 1 March 1985.) | Greens |
| Lower Saxony | List | | Julius H. Krizsan (Note: Julius H. Krizsan resigned on 13 March 1985.) | Greens |
| Lower Saxony | List | | Waltraud Schoppe (Note: Waltraud Schoppe resigned on 31 March 1985.) | Greens |
| Lower Saxony | List | | Heidemarie Dann (Note: Heidemarie Dann took office on 2 March 1985, to succeed Gert Jannsen.) | Greens |
| Lower Saxony | List | | Joachim Müller (Note: Joachim Müller took office on 13 March 1985, to succeed Erika Hickel.) | Greens |
| Lower Saxony | List | | Henning Schierholz (Note: Henning Schierholz took office on 14 March 1985, to succeed Julius H. Kriszan.) | Greens |
| Lower Saxony | List | | Helmut Werner (Note: Helmut Werner took office on 2 April 1985, to succeed Waltraud Schoppe.) | Greens |
| Bremen | 50 | Bremen-Ost | Ernst Waltemathe | SPD |
| Bremen | 51 | Bremen-West | Claus Grobecker (Note: Claus Grobecker resigned on 14 November 1983.) | SPD |
| Bremen | 52 | Bremerhaven – Bremen-Nord | Horst Grunenberg | SPD |
| Bremen | List | | Wolfgang Hinrichs | CDU |
| Bremen | List | | Reinhard Metz | CDU |
| Bremen | List | | Ludwig Hettling (Note: Ludwig Hettling took office on 15 November 1983, to succeed Claus Grobecker.) | SPD |
| North Rhine-Westphalia | 53 | Aachen | Hans Stercken | CDU |
| North Rhine-Westphalia | 54 | Kreis Aachen | Hans Peter Schmitz | CDU |
| North Rhine-Westphalia | 55 | Heinsberg | Adolf Spies von Büllesheim | CDU |
| North Rhine-Westphalia | 56 | Düren | Wolfgang Vogt | CDU |
| North Rhine-Westphalia | 57 | Erftkreis I | Klaus Lennartz | SPD |
| North Rhine-Westphalia | 58 | Euskirchen – Erftkreis II | Peter Milz (Note: Peter Milz died on 26 November 1986.) | CDU |
| North Rhine-Westphalia | 59 | Cologne I | Hans-Jürgen Wischnewski | SPD |
| North Rhine-Westphalia | 60 | Cologne II | Heribert Blens | CDU |
| North Rhine-Westphalia | 61 | Cologne III | Konrad Gilges | SPD |
| North Rhine-Westphalia | 62 | Cologne IV | Günter Herterich | SPD |
| North Rhine-Westphalia | 63 | Bonn | Hans Daniels | CDU |
| North Rhine-Westphalia | 64 | Rhein-Sieg-Kreis I | Adolf Herkenrath | CDU |
| North Rhine-Westphalia | 65 | Rhein-Sieg-Kreis II | Franz Möller | CDU |
| North Rhine-Westphalia | 66 | Oberbergischer Kreis | Horst Waffenschmidt | CDU |
| North Rhine-Westphalia | 67 | Rheinisch-Bergischer Kreis I | Franz Heinrich Krey | CDU |
| North Rhine-Westphalia | 68 | Leverkusen – Rheinisch-Bergischer Kreis II | Bruno Wiefel | SPD |
| North Rhine-Westphalia | 69 | Wuppertal I | Rudolf Dreßler | SPD |
| North Rhine-Westphalia | 70 | Wuppertal II | Willfried Penner | SPD |
| North Rhine-Westphalia | 71 | Solingen – Remscheid | Bernd Wilz | CDU |
| North Rhine-Westphalia | 72 | Mettmann I | Joseph-Theodor Blank | CDU |
| North Rhine-Westphalia | 73 | Mettmann II | Heinz Schemken | CDU |
| North Rhine-Westphalia | 74 | Düsseldorf I | Wolfgang Schulhoff | CDU |
| North Rhine-Westphalia | 75 | Düsseldorf II | Volker Jung | SPD |
| North Rhine-Westphalia | 76 | Neuss I | Heinz Günther Hüsch | CDU |
| North Rhine-Westphalia | 77 | Neuss II | Willy Wimmer | CDU |
| North Rhine-Westphalia | 78 | Mönchengladbach | Hans-Wilhelm Pesch | CDU |
| North Rhine-Westphalia | 79 | Krefeld | Hansheinz Hauser | CDU |
| North Rhine-Westphalia | 80 | Viersen | Julius Louven | CDU |
| North Rhine-Westphalia | 81 | Kleve | Heinrich Seesing | CDU |
| North Rhine-Westphalia | 82 | Wesel I | Uwe Jens | SPD |
| North Rhine-Westphalia | 83 | Wesel II | Jürgen Schmude | SPD |
| North Rhine-Westphalia | 84 | Duisburg I | Helmut Wieczorek | SPD |
| North Rhine-Westphalia | 85 | Duisburg II | Günter Schluckebier | SPD |
| North Rhine-Westphalia | 86 | Oberhausen | Dieter Schanz | SPD |
| North Rhine-Westphalia | 87 | Mülheim | Thomas Schröer | SPD |
| North Rhine-Westphalia | 88 | Essen I | Otto Reschke | SPD |
| North Rhine-Westphalia | 89 | Essen II | Peter Reuschenbach | SPD |
| North Rhine-Westphalia | 90 | Essen III | Paul Hoffacker | CDU |
| North Rhine-Westphalia | 91 | Recklinghausen I | Erich Wolfram | SPD |
| North Rhine-Westphalia | 92 | Recklinghausen II | Ulrich Steger (Note: Ulrich Steger resigned on 9 July 1984.) | SPD |
| North Rhine-Westphalia | 93 | Gelsenkirchen I | Joachim Poß | SPD |
| North Rhine-Westphalia | 94 | Gelsenkirchen II – Recklinghausen III | Heinz Menzel | SPD |
| North Rhine-Westphalia | 95 | Bottrop – Recklinghausen IV | Franz-Josef Mertens | SPD |
| North Rhine-Westphalia | 96 | Borken | Hermann Josef Unland | CDU |
| North Rhine-Westphalia | 97 | Coesfeld – Steinfurt I | Wilhelm Rawe | CDU |
| North Rhine-Westphalia | 98 | Steinfurt II | Constantin Heereman von Zuydtwyck | CDU |
| North Rhine-Westphalia | 99 | Münster | Friedrich-Adolf Jahn | CDU |
| North Rhine-Westphalia | 100 | Warendorf | Heinrich Windelen | CDU |
| North Rhine-Westphalia | 101 | Gütersloh | Ottfried Hennig | CDU |
| North Rhine-Westphalia | 102 | Bielefeld | Reinhard Meyer zu Bentrup | CDU |
| North Rhine-Westphalia | 103 | Herford | Heinz Landré | CDU |
| North Rhine-Westphalia | 104 | Minden-Lübbecke | Lothar Ibrügger | SPD |
| North Rhine-Westphalia | 105 | Lippe I | Klaus Daweke | CDU |
| North Rhine-Westphalia | 106 | Höxter – Lippe II | Meinolf Michels | CDU |
| North Rhine-Westphalia | 107 | Paderborn | Heinrich Pohlmeier | CDU |
| North Rhine-Westphalia | 108 | Hagen | Hans-Günther Toetemeyer | SPD |
| North Rhine-Westphalia | 109 | Ennepe-Ruhr-Kreis I | Eugen von der Wiesche | SPD |
| North Rhine-Westphalia | 110 | Bochum I | Karl Liedtke | SPD |
| North Rhine-Westphalia | 111 | Bochum II – Ennepe-Ruhr-Kreis II | Klaus Lohmann | SPD |
| North Rhine-Westphalia | 112 | Herne | Heinz Westphal | SPD |
| North Rhine-Westphalia | 113 | Dortmund I | Hans-Eberhard Urbaniak | SPD |
| North Rhine-Westphalia | 114 | Dortmund II | Alfred Meininghaus | SPD |
| North Rhine-Westphalia | 115 | Dortmund III | Werner Zeitler | SPD |
| North Rhine-Westphalia | 116 | Unna I | Manfred Schulte | SPD |
| North Rhine-Westphalia | 117 | Hamm – Unna II | Udo Fiebig | SPD |
| North Rhine-Westphalia | 118 | Soest | Hermann Kroll-Schlüter | CDU |
| North Rhine-Westphalia | 119 | Hochsauerlandkreis | Ferdinand Tillmann | CDU |
| North Rhine-Westphalia | 120 | Siegen-Wittgenstein I | Paul Breuer | CDU |
| North Rhine-Westphalia | 121 | Olpe – Siegen-Wittgenstein II | Willi Weiskirch | CDU |
| North Rhine-Westphalia | 122 | Märkischer Kreis I | Otto Wulff | CDU |
| North Rhine-Westphalia | 123 | Märkischer Kreis II | Wolfgang Lohmann | CDU |
| North Rhine-Westphalia | List | | Helmuth Becker | SPD |
| North Rhine-Westphalia | List | | Hans Gottfried Bernrath | SPD |
| North Rhine-Westphalia | List | | Erich Berschkeit | SPD |
| North Rhine-Westphalia | List | | Willy Brandt | SPD |
| North Rhine-Westphalia | List | | Hermann Buschfort | SPD |
| North Rhine-Westphalia | List | | Wolf-Michael Catenhusen | SPD |
| North Rhine-Westphalia | List | | Horst Ehmke | SPD |
| North Rhine-Westphalia | List | | Helmut Esters | SPD |
| North Rhine-Westphalia | List | | Anke Fuchs | SPD |
| North Rhine-Westphalia | List | | Katrin Fuchs | SPD |
| North Rhine-Westphalia | List | | Dieter Heistermann | SPD |
| North Rhine-Westphalia | List | | Uwe Holtz | SPD |
| North Rhine-Westphalia | List | | Antje Huber | SPD |
| North Rhine-Westphalia | List | | Horst Jaunich | SPD |
| North Rhine-Westphalia | List | | Karl-Heinz Klejdzinski | SPD |
| North Rhine-Westphalia | List | | Volkmar Kretkowski | SPD |
| North Rhine-Westphalia | List | | Manfred Lahnstein (Note: Manfred Lahnstein resigned on 31 August 1983.) | SPD |
| North Rhine-Westphalia | List | | Ingrid Matthäus-Maier | SPD |
| North Rhine-Westphalia | List | | Michael Müller | SPD |
| North Rhine-Westphalia | List | | Franz Müntefering | SPD |
| North Rhine-Westphalia | List | | Wilhelm Nöbel | SPD |
| North Rhine-Westphalia | List | | Rudolf Purps | SPD |
| North Rhine-Westphalia | List | | Annemarie Renger | SPD |
| North Rhine-Westphalia | List | | Engelbert Sander | SPD |
| North Rhine-Westphalia | List | | Günter Schlatter | SPD |
| North Rhine-Westphalia | List | | Adolf Schmidt | SPD |
| North Rhine-Westphalia | List | | Erwin Stahl | SPD |
| North Rhine-Westphalia | List | | Heinz-Alfred Steiner | SPD |
| North Rhine-Westphalia | List | | Waltraud Steinhauer | SPD |
| North Rhine-Westphalia | List | | Kurt Vogelsang | SPD |
| North Rhine-Westphalia | List | | Josef Vosen | SPD |
| North Rhine-Westphalia | List | | Helga Schmedt (Note: Helga Schmedt took office on 1 September 1983, to succeed Manfred Lahnstein.) | SPD |
| North Rhine-Westphalia | List | | Lothar Witek (Note: Lothar Witek took office on 16 July 1984, to succeed Ulrich Steger.) | SPD |
| North Rhine-Westphalia | List | | Rainer Barzel | CDU |
| North Rhine-Westphalia | List | | Norbert Blüm | CDU |
| North Rhine-Westphalia | List | | Jochen Borchert | CDU |
| North Rhine-Westphalia | List | | Gerhard Braun | CDU |
| North Rhine-Westphalia | List | | Leni Fischer | CDU |
| North Rhine-Westphalia | List | | Ludwig Gerstein | CDU |
| North Rhine-Westphalia | List | | Reinhard Göhner | CDU |
| North Rhine-Westphalia | List | | Horst Günther | CDU |
| North Rhine-Westphalia | List | | Herbert Hupka | CDU |
| North Rhine-Westphalia | List | | Agnes Hürland-Büning | CDU |
| North Rhine-Westphalia | List | | Irmgard Karwatzki | CDU |
| North Rhine-Westphalia | List | | Herbert W. Köhler | CDU |
| North Rhine-Westphalia | List | | Friedrich Kronenberg | CDU |
| North Rhine-Westphalia | List | | Karl Lamers | CDU |
| North Rhine-Westphalia | List | | Norbert Lammert | CDU |
| North Rhine-Westphalia | List | | Paul Löher | CDU |
| North Rhine-Westphalia | List | | Erwin Marschewski | CDU |
| North Rhine-Westphalia | List | | Paul Mikat | CDU |
| North Rhine-Westphalia | List | | Adolf Müller | CDU |
| North Rhine-Westphalia | List | | Alfons Müller | CDU |
| North Rhine-Westphalia | List | | Winfried Pinger | CDU |
| North Rhine-Westphalia | List | | Gerhard Reddemann | CDU |
| North Rhine-Westphalia | List | | Norbert Schlottmann | CDU |
| North Rhine-Westphalia | List | | Friedrich Vogel | CDU |
| North Rhine-Westphalia | List | | Helga Wex (Note: Helga Wex died on 9 January 1986.) | CDU |
| North Rhine-Westphalia | List | | Dorothee Wilms | CDU |
| North Rhine-Westphalia | List | | Wilhelm Peter Stommel (Note: Wilhelm Peter Stommel took office on 21 March 1985, to succeed Willi Weiskirch.) | CDU |
| North Rhine-Westphalia | List | | Franz-Josef Berners (Note: Franz-Josef Berners took office on 17 January 1986, to succeed Helga Wex.) | CDU |
| North Rhine-Westphalia | List | | Martin Horstmeier (Note: Martin Horstmeier took office on 3 December 1986, to succeed Peter Milz.) | CDU |
| North Rhine-Westphalia | List | | Gerhart Baum | FDP |
| North Rhine-Westphalia | List | | Klaus Beckmann | FDP |
| North Rhine-Westphalia | List | | Dieter-Julius Cronenberg | FDP |
| North Rhine-Westphalia | List | | Hans H. Gattermann | FDP |
| North Rhine-Westphalia | List | | Hans-Dietrich Genscher | FDP |
| North Rhine-Westphalia | List | | Burkhard Hirsch | FDP |
| North Rhine-Westphalia | List | | Karl-Hans Laermann | FDP |
| North Rhine-Westphalia | List | | Otto Graf Lambsdorff | FDP |
| North Rhine-Westphalia | List | | Jürgen Möllemann | FDP |
| North Rhine-Westphalia | List | | Irmgard Schwaetzer | FDP |
| North Rhine-Westphalia | List | | Dieter Drabiniok (Note: Dieter Drabiniok resigned on 31 March 1985.) | Greens |
| North Rhine-Westphalia | List | | Gabriele Gottwald (Note: Gabriele Gottwald resigned on 31 March 1985.) | Greens |
| North Rhine-Westphalia | List | | Christa Nickels (Note: Christa Nickels resigned on 30 March 1985.) | Greens |
| North Rhine-Westphalia | List | | Gabriele Potthast (Note: Gabriele Potthast resigned on 3 April 1985.) | Greens |
| North Rhine-Westphalia | List | | Otto Schily (Note: Otto Schily resigned on 13 March 1986.) | Greens |
| North Rhine-Westphalia | List | | Eckhard Stratmann-Mertens (Note: Eckhard Stratmann-Mertens resigned on 31 March 1985.) | Greens |
| North Rhine-Westphalia | List | | Hans Verheyen (Note: Hans Verheyen resigned on 30 March 1985.) | Greens |
| North Rhine-Westphalia | List | | Antje Vollmer (Note: Antje Vollmer resigned on 2 April 1985.) | Greens |
| North Rhine-Westphalia | List | | Annemarie Borgmann (Note: Annemarie Borgmann took office on 1 April 1985, to succeed Christa Nickels.) | Greens |
| North Rhine-Westphalia | List | | Norbert Mann (Note: Norbert Mann took office on 1 April 1985, to succeed Hans Verheyen.) | Greens |
| North Rhine-Westphalia | List | | Hans-Werner Senfft (Note: Hans-Werner Senfft took office on 3 April 1985, to succeed Dieter Drabiniok.) | Greens |
| North Rhine-Westphalia | List | | Marita Wagner (Note: Marita Wagner took office on 3 April 1985, to succeed Gabriele Gottwald.) | Greens |
| North Rhine-Westphalia | List | | Karin Zeitler (Note: Karin Zeitler took office on 3 April 1985, to succeed Antje Vollmer.) | Greens |
| North Rhine-Westphalia | List | | Ludger Volmer (Note: Ludger Volmer took office on 10 April 1985, to succeed Gabriele Potthast.) | Greens |
| North Rhine-Westphalia | List | | Stefan Schulte (Note: Stefan Schulte took office on 13 April 1985, to succeed Eckhard Stratmann-Mertens.) | Greens |
| North Rhine-Westphalia | List | | Horst Fritsch (Note: Horst Fritsch took office on 14 March 1986, to succeed Otto Schily.) | Greens |
| Hesse | 124 | Waldeck | Rudi Walther | SPD |
| Hesse | 125 | Kassel | Horst Peter | SPD |
| Hesse | 126 | Werra-Meißner | Albert Nehm | SPD |
| Hesse | 127 | Schwalm-Eder | Albert Pfuhl | SPD |
| Hesse | 128 | Hersfeld | Wilfried Böhm | CDU |
| Hesse | 129 | Marburg | Friedrich Bohl | CDU |
| Hesse | 130 | Lahn-Dill | Christian Lenzer | CDU |
| Hesse | 131 | Gießen | Adolf Roth | CDU |
| Hesse | 132 | Fulda | Alfred Dregger | CDU |
| Hesse | 133 | Hochtaunus | Manfred Langner | CDU |
| Hesse | 134 | Wetterau | Christian Schwarz-Schilling | CDU |
| Hesse | 135 | Rheingau-Taunus – Limburg | Benno Erhard | CDU |
| Hesse | 136 | Wiesbaden | Hannelore Rönsch | CDU |
| Hesse | 137 | Hanau | Richard Bayha | CDU |
| Hesse | 138 | Frankfurt am Main I – Main-Taunus | Heinz Riesenhuber | CDU |
| Hesse | 139 | Frankfurt am Main II | Karl Becker | CDU |
| Hesse | 140 | Frankfurt am Main III | Helmut Link | CDU |
| Hesse | 141 | Groß-Gerau | Otto Zink | CDU |
| Hesse | 142 | Offenbach | Klaus Lippold | CDU |
| Hesse | 143 | Darmstadt | Helga Timm | SPD |
| Hesse | 144 | Odenwald | Alexander Warrikoff | CDU |
| Hesse | 145 | Bergstraße | Carl Otto Lenz (Note: Carl Otto Lenz resigned on 13 January 1984.) | CDU |
| Hesse | List | | Walter Buckpesch | SPD |
| Hesse | List | | Christa Czempiel (Note: Christa Czempiel resigned on 5 July 1984.) | SPD |
| Hesse | List | | Klaus Daubertshäuser | SPD |
| Hesse | List | | Wendelin Enders | SPD |
| Hesse | List | | Erwin Horn | SPD |
| Hesse | List | | Gerhard Jahn | SPD |
| Hesse | List | | Heinrich Klein | SPD |
| Hesse | List | | Klaus Kübler | SPD |
| Hesse | List | | Hans Matthöfer | SPD |
| Hesse | List | | Bernd Reuter | SPD |
| Hesse | List | | Georg Schlaga | SPD |
| Hesse | List | | Rudi Schmitt | SPD |
| Hesse | List | | Dietrich Sperling | SPD |
| Hesse | List | | Karsten Voigt | SPD |
| Hesse | List | | Fred Zander | SPD |
| Hesse | List | | Norbert Wieczorek (Note: Norbert Wieczorek took office on 11 July 1984, to succeed Christa Czempiel.) | SPD |
| Hesse | List | | Lothar Haase (Note: Lothar Haase resigned on 5 December 1983.) | CDU |
| Hesse | List | | Bernhard Jagoda | CDU |
| Hesse | List | | Gerhard O. Pfeffermann | CDU |
| Hesse | List | | Dieter Weirich | CDU |
| Hesse | List | | Karl Stockhausen (Note: Karl Stockhausen took office on 6 December 1983, to succeed Lothar Haase.) | CDU |
| Hesse | List | | Anneliese Augustin (Note: Anneliese Augustin took office on 13 January 1984, to succeed Carl Otto Lenz.) | CDU |
| Hesse | List | | Klaus-Jürgen Hoffie | FDP |
| Hesse | List | | Wolfgang Mischnick | FDP |
| Hesse | List | | Hermann Otto Solms | FDP |
| Hesse | List | | Richard Wurbs (Note: Richard Wurbs resigned on 13 December 1984.) | FDP |
| Hesse | List | | Inge Segall (Note: Inge Segall took office on 13 December 1984, to succeed Richard Wurbs.) | FDP |
| Hesse | List | | Joschka Fischer (Note: Joschka Fischer resigned on 31 March 1985.) | Greens |
| Hesse | List | | Klaus Hecker (Note: Klaus Hecker resigned on 31 August 1983.) | Greens |
| Hesse | List | | Hubert Kleinert (Note: Hubert Kleinert resigned on 19 January 1986.) | Greens |
| Hesse | List | | Milan Horáček (Note: Milan Horácek took office on 2 September 1983, to succeed Klaus Hecker, but later resigned on 3 October 1985.) | Greens |
| Hesse | List | | Heinz Suhr (Note: Heinz Suhr took office on 1 April 1985, to succeed Joschka Fischer.) | Greens |
| Hesse | List | | Herbert Rusche (Note: Herbert Rusche took office on 4 October 1985, to succeed Milan Horáček.) | Greens |
| Hesse | List | | Ulrich Fischer (Note: Ulrich Fischer took office on 20 January 1986, to succeed Hubert Kleinert.) | Greens |
| Rhineland-Palatinate | 146 | Neuwied | Heinz Schwarz | CDU |
| Rhineland-Palatinate | 147 | Ahrweiler | Karl Deres | CDU |
| Rhineland-Palatinate | 148 | Koblenz | Roswitha Verhülsdonk | CDU |
| Rhineland-Palatinate | 149 | Cochem | Waltrud Will-Feld | CDU |
| Rhineland-Palatinate | 150 | Kreuznach | Günther Leonhart | SPD |
| Rhineland-Palatinate | 151 | Bitburg | Alois Mertes (Note: Alois Mertes died on 16 June 1985.) | CDU |
| Rhineland-Palatinate | 152 | Trier | Günther Schartz | CDU |
| Rhineland-Palatinate | 153 | Montabaur | August Hanz | CDU |
| Rhineland-Palatinate | 154 | Mainz | Johannes Gerster | CDU |
| Rhineland-Palatinate | 155 | Worms | Gernot Fischer | SPD |
| Rhineland-Palatinate | 156 | Frankenthal | Horst Sielaff | SPD |
| Rhineland-Palatinate | 157 | Ludwigshafen | Manfred Reimann | SPD |
| Rhineland-Palatinate | 158 | Neustadt – Speyer | Theo Magin | CDU |
| Rhineland-Palatinate | 159 | Kaiserslautern | Adolf Müller-Emmert | SPD |
| Rhineland-Palatinate | 160 | Pirmasens | Werner Marx (Note: Werner Marx died on 12 July 1985.) | CDU |
| Rhineland-Palatinate | 161 | Landau | Heiner Geißler | CDU |
| Rhineland-Palatinate | List | | Peter Büchner | SPD |
| Rhineland-Palatinate | List | | Hugo Collet | SPD |
| Rhineland-Palatinate | List | | Karl Delorme | SPD |
| Rhineland-Palatinate | List | | Karl Haehser | SPD |
| Rhineland-Palatinate | List | | Klaus Immer | SPD |
| Rhineland-Palatinate | List | | Günter Pauli | SPD |
| Rhineland-Palatinate | List | | Gudrun Weyel | SPD |
| Rhineland-Palatinate | List | | Markus Berger | CDU |
| Rhineland-Palatinate | List | | Hansjürgen Doss | CDU |
| Rhineland-Palatinate | List | | Helmut Kohl | CDU |
| Rhineland-Palatinate | List | | Manfred Schneider | CDU |
| Rhineland-Palatinate | List | | Werner Weiß | CDU |
| Rhineland-Palatinate | List | | Heribert Scharrenbroich (Note: Heribert Scharrenbroich took office on 19 June 1985, to succeed Alois Mertes.) | CDU |
| Rhineland-Palatinate | List | | Helmut Schultz (Note: Helmut Schultz took office on 22 July 1985, to succeed Werner Marx.) | CDU |
| Rhineland-Palatinate | List | | Wolfgang Rumpf | FDP |
| Rhineland-Palatinate | List | | Helmut Schäfer | FDP |
| Rhineland-Palatinate | List | | Roland Vogt (Note: Roland Vogt resigned on 18 June 1985.) | Greens |
| Rhineland-Palatinate | List | | Willi Tatge (Note: Willi Tatge took office on 18 June 1985, to succeed Roland Vogt.) | Greens |
| Baden-Württemberg | 162 | Stuttgart-Süd | Roland Sauer | CDU |
| Baden-Württemberg | 163 | Stuttgart-Nord | Herbert Czaja | CDU |
| Baden-Württemberg | 164 | Böblingen | Peter Petersen | CDU |
| Baden-Württemberg | 165 | Esslingen | Otto Hauser | CDU |
| Baden-Württemberg | 166 | Nürtingen | Anton Stark | CDU |
| Baden-Württemberg | 167 | Göppingen | Manfred Wörner | CDU |
| Baden-Württemberg | 168 | Waiblingen | Paul Laufs | CDU |
| Baden-Württemberg | 169 | Ludwigsburg | Matthias Wissmann | CDU |
| Baden-Württemberg | 170 | Neckar-Zaber | Renate Hellwig | CDU |
| Baden-Württemberg | 171 | Heilbronn | Egon Susset | CDU |
| Baden-Württemberg | 172 | Schwäbisch Hall | Philipp Jenninger | CDU |
| Baden-Württemberg | 173 | Backnang – Schwäbisch Gmünd | Dieter Schulte | CDU |
| Baden-Württemberg | 174 | Aalen – Heidenheim | Manfred Abelein | CDU |
| Baden-Württemberg | 175 | Karlsruhe-Stadt | Rudolf Ruf | CDU |
| Baden-Württemberg | 176 | Karlsruhe-Land | Klaus Bühler | CDU |
| Baden-Württemberg | 177 | Rastatt | Bernhard Friedmann | CDU |
| Baden-Württemberg | 178 | Heidelberg | Udo Ehrbar | CDU |
| Baden-Württemberg | 179 | Mannheim I | Werner Nagel | SPD |
| Baden-Württemberg | 180 | Mannheim II | Roswitha Wisniewski | CDU |
| Baden-Württemberg | 181 | Odenwald – Tauber | Karl Miltner | CDU |
| Baden-Württemberg | 182 | Rhein-Neckar | Bernd Schmidbauer | CDU |
| Baden-Württemberg | 183 | Pforzheim | Lutz Stavenhagen | CDU |
| Baden-Württemberg | 184 | Calw | Haimo George (Note: Haimo George died on 5 October 1985.) | CDU |
| Baden-Württemberg | 185 | Freiburg | Conrad Schroeder | CDU |
| Baden-Württemberg | 186 | Lörrach – Müllheim | Wilhelm Jung | CDU |
| Baden-Württemberg | 187 | Emmendingen – Lahr | Rainer Haungs | CDU |
| Baden-Württemberg | 188 | Offenburg | Wolfgang Schäuble | CDU |
| Baden-Württemberg | 189 | Rottweil | Franz Sauter | CDU |
| Baden-Württemberg | 190 | Schwarzwald-Baar | Hansjörg Häfele | CDU |
| Baden-Württemberg | 191 | Konstanz | Hans-Peter Repnik | CDU |
| Baden-Württemberg | 192 | Waldshut | Werner Dörflinger | CDU |
| Baden-Württemberg | 193 | Reutlingen | Anton Pfeifer | CDU |
| Baden-Württemberg | 194 | Tübingen | Jürgen Todenhöfer | CDU |
| Baden-Württemberg | 195 | Ulm | Herbert Werner | CDU |
| Baden-Württemberg | 196 | Biberach | Alois Graf von Waldburg-Zeil | CDU |
| Baden-Württemberg | 197 | Ravensburg – Bodensee | Elmar Kolb | CDU |
| Baden-Württemberg | 198 | Zollernalb – Sigmaringen | Hermann Schwörer | CDU |
| Baden-Württemberg | List | | Robert Antretter | SPD |
| Baden-Württemberg | List | | Hermann Bachmaier | SPD |
| Baden-Württemberg | List | | Rudolf Bindig | SPD |
| Baden-Württemberg | List | | Gerhard Brosi (Note: Gerhard Brosi died on 3 April 1984.) | SPD |
| Baden-Württemberg | List | | Andreas von Bülow | SPD |
| Baden-Württemberg | List | | Peter Conradi | SPD |
| Baden-Württemberg | List | | Herta Däubler-Gmelin | SPD |
| Baden-Württemberg | List | | Ernst Haar | SPD |
| Baden-Württemberg | List | | Liesel Hartenstein | SPD |
| Baden-Württemberg | List | | Volker Hauff | SPD |
| Baden-Württemberg | List | | Gunter Huonker | SPD |
| Baden-Württemberg | List | | Klaus Kirschner | SPD |
| Baden-Württemberg | List | | Doris Odendahl | SPD |
| Baden-Württemberg | List | | Rainer Offergeld (Note: Rainer Offergeld resigned on 1 June 1984.) | SPD |
| Baden-Württemberg | List | | Heinz Rapp | SPD |
| Baden-Württemberg | List | | Wolfgang Roth | SPD |
| Baden-Württemberg | List | | Harald B. Schäfer | SPD |
| Baden-Württemberg | List | | Hermann Scheer | SPD |
| Baden-Württemberg | List | | Hartmut Soell | SPD |
| Baden-Württemberg | List | | Dieter Spöri | SPD |
| Baden-Württemberg | List | | Gert Weisskirchen | SPD |
| Baden-Württemberg | List | | Ruth Zutt | SPD |
| Baden-Württemberg | List | | Renate Lepsius (Note: Renate Lepsius took office on 12 April 1984, to succeed Gerhard Brosi.) | SPD |
| Baden-Württemberg | List | | Peter Corterier (Note: Peter Corterier took office on 13 June 1984, to succeed Rainer Offergeld.) | SPD |
| Baden-Württemberg | List | | Olaf Feldmann | FDP |
| Baden-Württemberg | List | | Georg Gallus | FDP |
| Baden-Württemberg | List | | Martin Grüner | FDP |
| Baden-Württemberg | List | | Helmut Haussmann | FDP |
| Baden-Württemberg | List | | Roland Kohn | FDP |
| Baden-Württemberg | List | | Ursula Seiler-Albring | FDP |
| Baden-Württemberg | List | | Wolfgang Weng | FDP |
| Baden-Württemberg | List | | Marieluise Beck-Oberdorf (Note: Marieluise Beck-Oberdorf resigned on 14 April 1985.) | Greens |
| Baden-Württemberg | List | | Wolfgang Ehmke (Note: Wolfgang Ehmke resigned on 28 March 1985.) | Greens |
| Baden-Württemberg | List | | Willi Hoss (Note: Willi Hoss resigned on 12 April 1985.) | Greens |
| Baden-Württemberg | List | | Christa Reetz (Note: Christa Reetz resigned on 16 April 1985.) | Greens |
| Baden-Württemberg | List | | Walter Schwenninger (Note: Walter Schwenninger resigned on 16 April 1985.) | Greens |
| Baden-Württemberg | List | | Udo Tischer (Note: Udo Tischer took office on 3 April 1985, to succeed Wolfgang Ehmke.) | Greens |
| Baden-Württemberg | List | | Hannegret Hönes (Note: Hannegret Hönes took office on 13 April 1985, to succeed Willi Hoss.) | Greens |
| Baden-Württemberg | List | | Uschi Eid (Note: Uschi Eid took office on 17 April 1985, to succeed Marieluise Beck-Oberdorf.) | Greens |
| Baden-Württemberg | List | | Hendrik Auhagen (Note: Hendrik Auhagen took office on 17 April 1985, to succeed Walter Schwenninger.) | Greens |
| Baden-Württemberg | List | | Torsten Lange (Note: Torsten Lange took office on 17 April 1985, to succeed Christa Reetz.) | Greens |
| Baden-Württemberg | List | | Josef Bugl | CDU |
| Baden-Württemberg | List | | Siegfried Hornung | CDU |
| Baden-Württemberg | List | | Claus Jäger | CDU |
| Baden-Württemberg | List | | Honor Funk (Note: Honor Funk took office on 14 October 1985, to succeed Haimo George.) | CDU |
| Bavaria | 199 | Altötting | Karl-Heinz Spilker | CSU |
| Bavaria | 200 | Freising | Albert Probst | CSU |
| Bavaria | 201 | Fürstenfeldbruck | Eicke Götz | CSU |
| Bavaria | 202 | Ingolstadt | Horst Seehofer | CSU |
| Bavaria | 203 | Munich Centre | Manfred Schmidt | SPD |
| Bavaria | 204 | Munich North | Fritz Wittmann | CSU |
| Bavaria | 205 | Munich East | Rudolf Kraus | CSU |
| Bavaria | 206 | Munich South | Erich Riedl | CSU |
| Bavaria | 207 | Munich West | Kurt Faltlhauser | CSU |
| Bavaria | 208 | Munich Land | Josef Linsmeier | CSU |
| Bavaria | 209 | Rosenheim | Hans Graf Huyn | CSU |
| Bavaria | 210 | Starnberg | Franz-Ludwig Schenk Graf von Stauffenberg (Note: Franz-Ludwig Schenk Graf von Stauffenberg resigned on 20 November 1984.) | CSU |
| Bavaria | 211 | Traunstein | Matthias Engelsberger | CSU |
| Bavaria | 212 | Weilheim | Vacant (Note: Member-elect Franz Josef Strauss (CSU) declined to take office.) | |
| Bavaria | 213 | Deggendorf | Franz Handlos | CSU |
| Bavaria | 214 | Landshut | Friedrich Zimmermann | CSU |
| Bavaria | 215 | Passau | Klaus Rose | CSU |
| Bavaria | 216 | Rottal-Inn | Günther Müller | CSU |
| Bavaria | 217 | Straubing | Ernst Hinsken | CSU |
| Bavaria | 218 | Amberg | Hermann Fellner | CSU |
| Bavaria | 219 | Regensburg | Benno Zierer | CSU |
| Bavaria | 220 | Schwandorf | Dionys Jobst | CSU |
| Bavaria | 221 | Weiden | Max Kunz | CSU |
| Bavaria | 222 | Bamberg | Gerhard Scheu | CSU |
| Bavaria | 223 | Bayreuth | Ortwin Lowack | CSU |
| Bavaria | 224 | Coburg | Otto Regenspurger | CSU |
| Bavaria | 225 | Hof | Jürgen Warnke | CSU |
| Bavaria | 226 | Kulmbach | Lorenz Niegel | CSU |
| Bavaria | 227 | Ansbach | Carl-Dieter Spranger | CSU |
| Bavaria | 228 | Erlangen | Klaus Hartmann (Note: Klaus Hartmann resigned on 4 June 1984.) | CSU |
| Bavaria | 229 | Fürth | Werner Dollinger | CSU |
| Bavaria | 230 | Nuremberg North | Oscar Schneider | CSU |
| Bavaria | 231 | Nuremberg South | Peter Wilhelm Höffkes | CSU |
| Bavaria | 232 | Roth | Richard Stücklen | CSU |
| Bavaria | 233 | Aschaffenburg | Paul Gerlach | CSU |
| Bavaria | 234 | Bad Kissingen | Eduard Lintner | CSU |
| Bavaria | 235 | Main-Spessart | Alfred Biehle | CSU |
| Bavaria | 236 | Schweinfurt | Michael Glos | CSU |
| Bavaria | 237 | Würzburg | Wolfgang Bötsch | CSU |
| Bavaria | 238 | Augsburg-Stadt | Stefan Höpfinger | CSU |
| Bavaria | 239 | Augsburg-Land | Walter Althammer (Note: Walter Althammer resigned on 14 April 1985.) | CSU |
| Bavaria | 240 | Donau-Ries | Karl Heinz Lemmrich | CSU |
| Bavaria | 241 | Neu-Ulm | Theo Waigel | CSU |
| Bavaria | 242 | Oberallgäu | Ignaz Kiechle | CSU |
| Bavaria | 243 | Ostallgäu | Kurt Rossmanith | CSU |
| Bavaria | List | | Max Amling | SPD |
| Bavaria | List | | Georg Bamberg | SPD |
| Bavaria | List | | Hans Büchler | SPD |
| Bavaria | List | | Friedrich Gerstl | SPD |
| Bavaria | List | | Peter Glotz | SPD |
| Bavaria | List | | Dieter Haack | SPD |
| Bavaria | List | | Horst Haase | SPD |
| Bavaria | List | | Karl Kisslinger | SPD |
| Bavaria | List | | Walter Kolbow | SPD |
| Bavaria | List | | Uwe Lambinus | SPD |
| Bavaria | List | | Egon Lutz | SPD |
| Bavaria | List | | Anke Martiny-Glotz | SPD |
| Bavaria | List | | Rudolf Müller | SPD |
| Bavaria | List | | Konrad Porzner | SPD |
| Bavaria | List | | Renate Schmidt | SPD |
| Bavaria | List | | Rudolf Schöfberger | SPD |
| Bavaria | List | | Wolfgang Sieler | SPD |
| Bavaria | List | | Sigrid Skarpelis-Sperk | SPD |
| Bavaria | List | | Ludwig Stiegler | SPD |
| Bavaria | List | | Jürgen Vahlberg | SPD |
| Bavaria | List | | Günter Verheugen | SPD |
| Bavaria | List | | Karl Weinhofer | SPD |
| Bavaria | List | | Axel Wernitz | SPD |
| Bavaria | List | | Hermann Wimmer | SPD |
| Bavaria | List | | Hans de With | SPD |
| Bavaria | List | | Michaela Geiger | CSU |
| Bavaria | List | | Peter Keller | CSU |
| Bavaria | List | | Hans Klein | CSU |
| Bavaria | List | | Reinhold Kreile | CSU |
| Bavaria | List | | Ursula Krone-Appuhn | CSU |
| Bavaria | List | | Ursula Männle | CSU |
| Bavaria | List | | Alfred Sauter | CSU |
| Bavaria | List | | Ekkehard Voigt | CSU |
| Bavaria | List | | Friedrich Voss | CSU |
| Bavaria | List | | Josef Brunner (Note: Josef Brunner took office after member-elect Franz Josef Strauss declined to take office.) | CSU |
| Bavaria | List | | Wolfgang Götzer (Note: Wolfgang Götzer took office on 4 June 1984, to succeed Klaus Hartmann.) | CSU |
| Bavaria | List | | Simon Wittmann (Note: Simon Wittmann took office on 20 November 1984, to succeed Franz-Ludwig Schenk Graf von Stauffenberg.) | CSU |
| Bavaria | List | | Ernst Josef Pöppl (Note: Ernst Josef Pöppl took office on 15 April 1985, to succeed Walter Althammer.) | CSU |
| Bavaria | List | | Norbert Eimer | FDP |
| Bavaria | List | | Hans A. Engelhard | FDP |
| Bavaria | List | | Josef Ertl | FDP |
| Bavaria | List | | Josef Grünbeck | FDP |
| Bavaria | List | | Hildegard Hamm-Brücher | FDP |
| Bavaria | List | | Hans Paintner | FDP |
| Bavaria | List | | Sabine Bard (Note: Sabine Bard resigned on 31 March 1985.) | Greens |
| Bavaria | List | | Gert Bastian | Greens |
| Bavaria | List | | Dieter Burgmann (Note: Dieter Burgmann resigned on 15 March 1985.) | Greens |
| Bavaria | List | | Petra Kelly | Greens |
| Bavaria | List | | Axel Vogel (Note: Axel Vogel took office on 16 March 1985, to succeed Dieter Burgmann.) | Greens |
| Bavaria | List | | Eberhard Bueb (Note: Eberhard Bueb took office on 1 April 1985, to succeed Sabine Bard.) | Greens |
| Saarland | 244 | Saarbrücken I | Hajo Hoffmann (Note: Hajo Hoffmann resigned on 11 April 1985.) | SPD |
| Saarland | 245 | Saarbrücken II | Franz Josef Conrad (Note: Franz Josef Conrad died on 12 September 1985.) | CDU |
| Saarland | 246 | Saarlouis | Hans-Werner Müller | CDU |
| Saarland | 247 | St. Wendel | Johannes Ganz | CDU |
| Saarland | 248 | Homburg | Lothar Fischer | SPD |
| Saarland | List | | Alwin Brück | SPD |
| Saarland | List | | Ottmar Schreiner | SPD |
| Saarland | List | | Fred Ranker (Note: Fred Ranker took office on 11 April 1985, to succeed Hajo Hoffmann.) | SPD |
| Saarland | List | | Werner Schreiber | CDU |
| Saarland | List | | Doris Pack (Note: Doris Pack took office on 1 October 1985, to succeed Franz Josef Conrad.) | CDU |
| West Berlin | | | Lieselotte Berger | CDU |
| West Berlin | | | Peter Boroffka | CDU |
| West Berlin | | | Helmut Buschbom | CDU |
| West Berlin | | | Werner Dolata | CDU |
| West Berlin | | | Jochen Feilcke | CDU |
| West Berlin | | | Wolfgang Hackel (Note: Wolfgang Hackel resigned on 1 December 1985.) | CDU |
| West Berlin | | | Joachim Kalisch | CDU |
| West Berlin | | | Peter Kittelmann | CDU |
| West Berlin | | | Peter Lorenz | CDU |
| West Berlin | | | Gerhard Schulze | CDU |
| West Berlin | | | Günter Straßmeir | CDU |
| West Berlin | | | Gero Pfennig (Note: Gero Pfennig took office on 2 December 1985, to succeed Wolfgang Hackel.) | CDU |
| West Berlin | | | Nils Diederich | SPD |
| West Berlin | | | Jürgen Egert | SPD |
| West Berlin | | | Gerhard Heimann | SPD |
| West Berlin | | | Lothar Löffler | SPD |
| West Berlin | | | Dagmar Luuk | SPD |
| West Berlin | | | Peter Mitzscherling | SPD |
| West Berlin | | | Dietrich Stobbe | SPD |
| West Berlin | | | Hans-Jochen Vogel | SPD |
| West Berlin | | | Gerd Wartenberg | SPD |
| West Berlin | | | Hans-Günter Hoppe | FDP |
| West Berlin | | | Dirk Schneider | Greens |
| West Berlin | | | Hans-Christian Ströbele (Note: Hans-Christian Ströbele took office on 31 March 1985, to succeed Dirk Schneider.) | Greens |

== See also ==
- Politics of Germany
- List of Bundestag Members
