= Ahrweiler (electoral district) =

Federal electoral district of Germany

Coordinates: 50.414417°N 7.128816°E

197 Ahrweiler
- Electoral district for the Bundestag
- Ahrweiler in 2025
- State: Rhineland-Palatinate
- Population: 250,200 (2019)
- Electorate: 191,196 (2025)
- Major settlements: Andernach; Bad Neuenahr-Ahrweiler; Mayen
- Area: 1,337.3 km^{2}

Current electoral district
- Created: 1949
- Party: CDU
- Member: Mechthild Heil
- Elected: 2009, 2013, 2017, 2021, 2025

Ahrweiler is an electoral constituency (German: Wahlkreis) represented in the Bundestag. It elects one member via first-past-the-post voting. Under the current constituency numbering system, it is designated as constituency 197. It is located in northern Rhineland-Palatinate, comprising the Ahrweiler district and the western part of the Mayen-Koblenz district.

Ahrweiler was created for the inaugural 1949 federal election. Since 2009, it has been represented by Mechthild Heil of the Christian Democratic Union (CDU).

== Geography ==
Ahrweiler is located in northern Rhineland-Palatinate. As of the 2021 federal election, it comprises the district of Ahrweiler as well as the municipalities of Andernach and Mayen and the Verbandsgemeinden of Maifeld, Mendig, Pellenz, and Vordereifel from the district of Mayen-Koblenz.

== History ==
Ahrweiler was created in 1949. In the 1949 election, it was Rhineland-Palatinate constituency 2 in the numbering system. In the 1953 through 1976 elections, it was number 149. In the 1980 through 1998 elections, it was number 147. In the 2002 election, it was number 201. In the 2005 election, it was number 200. In the 2009 and 2013 elections, it was number 199. In the 2017 and 2021 elections, it was number 198. From the 2025 election, it has been number 197.

Originally, the constituency comprised the districts of Ahrweiler and Mayen. It acquired its current borders in the 1972 election, although the Verbandsgemeinden of Pellenz and Vordereifel were known as Andernach-Land and Mayen-Land, respectively, until 2002.

Election	No.	Name	Borders
1949	2	Ahrweiler	Ahrweiler district; Mayen district
1953	149	Ahrweiler	Ahrweiler district; Mayen district
1957	149	Ahrweiler	Ahrweiler district; Mayen district
1961	149	Ahrweiler	Ahrweiler district; Mayen district
1965	149	Ahrweiler	Ahrweiler district; Mayen district
1969	149	Ahrweiler	Ahrweiler district; Mayen district
1972	149	Ahrweiler	Ahrweiler district; Mayen-Koblenz district (only Andernach and Mayen municipalities and Maifeld, Mendig, Pellenz, and Vordereifel Verbandsgemeinden)
1976	149	Ahrweiler	Ahrweiler district; Mayen-Koblenz district (only Andernach and Mayen municipalities and Maifeld, Mendig, Pellenz, and Vordereifel Verbandsgemeinden)
1980	147	Ahrweiler	Ahrweiler district; Mayen-Koblenz district (only Andernach and Mayen municipalities and Maifeld, Mendig, Pellenz, and Vordereifel Verbandsgemeinden)
1983	147	Ahrweiler	Ahrweiler district; Mayen-Koblenz district (only Andernach and Mayen municipalities and Maifeld, Mendig, Pellenz, and Vordereifel Verbandsgemeinden)
1987	147	Ahrweiler	Ahrweiler district; Mayen-Koblenz district (only Andernach and Mayen municipalities and Maifeld, Mendig, Pellenz, and Vordereifel Verbandsgemeinden)
1990	147	Ahrweiler	Ahrweiler district; Mayen-Koblenz district (only Andernach and Mayen municipalities and Maifeld, Mendig, Pellenz, and Vordereifel Verbandsgemeinden)
1994	147	Ahrweiler	Ahrweiler district; Mayen-Koblenz district (only Andernach and Mayen municipalities and Maifeld, Mendig, Pellenz, and Vordereifel Verbandsgemeinden)
1998	147	Ahrweiler	Ahrweiler district; Mayen-Koblenz district (only Andernach and Mayen municipalities and Maifeld, Mendig, Pellenz, and Vordereifel Verbandsgemeinden)
2002	201	Ahrweiler	Ahrweiler district; Mayen-Koblenz district (only Andernach and Mayen municipalities and Maifeld, Mendig, Pellenz, and Vordereifel Verbandsgemeinden)
2005	200	Ahrweiler	Ahrweiler district; Mayen-Koblenz district (only Andernach and Mayen municipalities and Maifeld, Mendig, Pellenz, and Vordereifel Verbandsgemeinden)
2009	199	Ahrweiler	Ahrweiler district; Mayen-Koblenz district (only Andernach and Mayen municipalities and Maifeld, Mendig, Pellenz, and Vordereifel Verbandsgemeinden)
2013	199	Ahrweiler	Ahrweiler district; Mayen-Koblenz district (only Andernach and Mayen municipalities and Maifeld, Mendig, Pellenz, and Vordereifel Verbandsgemeinden)
2017	198	Ahrweiler	Ahrweiler district; Mayen-Koblenz district (only Andernach and Mayen municipalities and Maifeld, Mendig, Pellenz, and Vordereifel Verbandsgemeinden)
2021	198	Ahrweiler	Ahrweiler district; Mayen-Koblenz district (only Andernach and Mayen municipalities and Maifeld, Mendig, Pellenz, and Vordereifel Verbandsgemeinden)
2025	197	Ahrweiler	Ahrweiler district; Mayen-Koblenz district (only Andernach and Mayen municipalities and Maifeld, Mendig, Pellenz, and Vordereifel Verbandsgemeinden)

== Members ==
The constituency has been held continuously by the Christian Democratic Union (CDU) since its creation. It was first represented by Johann Junglas from 1949 to 1953, followed by Otto Lenz until 1957. Johann Peter Josten served from 1957 to 1980. He was succeeded by Karl Deres, who was representative until 1994. Wilhelm Josef Sebastian served from 1994 to 2009. Mechthild Heil was elected in 2009, and re-elected in 2013, 2017, 2021, and 2025.

Election	Member	Party	%
1949	Johann Junglas	CDU	67.9
1953	Otto Lenz	CDU	71.8
1957	Johann Peter Josten	CDU	73.9
1961	Johann Peter Josten	CDU	69.0
1965	Johann Peter Josten	CDU	67.4
1969	Johann Peter Josten	CDU	62.0
1972	Johann Peter Josten	CDU	57.8
1976	Johann Peter Josten	CDU	60.0
1980	Karl Deres	CDU	56.4
1983	Karl Deres	CDU	62.8
1987	Karl Deres	CDU	57.6
1990	Karl Deres	CDU	54.2
1994	Wilhelm Josef Sebastian	CDU	52.9
1998	Wilhelm Josef Sebastian	CDU	48.3
2002	Wilhelm Josef Sebastian	CDU	48.3
2005	Wilhelm Josef Sebastian	CDU	49.6
2009	Mechthild Heil	CDU	45.5
2013	Mechthild Heil	CDU	55.5
2017	Mechthild Heil	CDU	42.8
2021	Mechthild Heil	CDU	34.3
2025	Mechthild Heil	CDU	39.3

== Election results ==
=== 2025 election ===
Federal election (2025): Ahrweiler
Notes:	Blue background denotes the winner of the electorate vote. Pink background denotes a candidate elected from their party list. Yellow background denotes an electorate win by a list member, or other incumbent. A ✓ or ✗ denotes status of any incumbent, win or lose respectively.						
Party	Candidate	Votes	%	±%	Party votes	%	±%
CDU	✓ Mechthild Heil	62,012	39.3	▲5.0	55,289	34.8	▲6.3
AfD	Martin Kallweitt	28,335	17.9	▲10.6	29,076	18.3	▲10.6
SPD	Ferdi Akaltin	30,537	19.3	▼10.9	28,429	17.9	▼10.8
Greens	Verena Örenbas	14,413	9.1	▼1.5	15,725	9.9	▼2.1
Left	Lucas Schön	8,224	5.2	▲2.8	9,069	5.7	▲3.1
FDP	Ulrich Hermani	5,282	3.3	▼4.9	7,563	4.8	▼7.1
FW	Daid Eilert	5,584	3.5	▼1.2	3,170	2.0	▼1.3
Tierschutzpartei					1,769	1.1	▼0.3
Volt	Isabel Arens	2,016	1.3	New	1,105	0.7	▲0.3
PARTEI					685	0.4	▼0.4
ÖDP	Brigitte Doege	833	0.5	▲0.1	333	0.2	0.0
BD	Axel Popp	717	0.5	New	303	0.2	New
MLPD					33	<0.1	0.0
Informal votes		1,701			965		
Total valid votes		157,953			158,689		
Turnout		159,654	83.5	▲7.4			
CDU hold	Majority	31,475	20.0	▲15.9			

=== 2021 election ===
Federal election (2021): Ahrweiler
Notes:	Blue background denotes the winner of the electorate vote. Pink background denotes a candidate elected from their party list. Yellow background denotes an electorate win by a list member, or other incumbent. A ✓ or ✗ denotes status of any incumbent, win or lose respectively.						
Party	Candidate	Votes	%	±%	Party votes	%	±%
CDU	✓ Mechthild Heil	50,281	34.3	▼8.5	41,942	28.5	▼12.1
SPD	Christoph Schmitt	44,325	30.2	▲2.9	42,303	28.8	▲6.0
Greens	Martin Schmitt	15,553	10.6	▲4.9	17,685	12.0	▲5.3
FDP	Jannick Simon	12,124	8.3	▼0.4	17,484	11.9	▲0.3
AfD	Rüdiger Nothnick	10,823	7.4	▼1.4	11,322	7.7	▼1.9
FW	Stefan Mies	6,942	4.7		4,908	3.3	▲2.6
Left	Aziz Aldemir	3,537	2.4	▼2.1	3,851	2.6	▼3.1
Tierschutzpartei					2,021	1.4	
dieBasis	Franz-Gerhard Hoyer	1,878	1.3		1,613	1.1	
PARTEI					1,208	0.8	0.0
Pirates					673	0.5	0.0
Team Todenhöfer					609	0.1	
Volt					557	0.4	
ÖDP	Brigitte Doege	686	0.5		331	0.2	0.0
Independent	Alina Mandel	456	0.3				
NPD					145	0.1	▼0.2
V-Partei3					124	0.1	▼0.2
Humanists					116	0.1	
DiB					107	0.1	
LKR					62	0.0	
MLPD					26	0.0	0.0
Informal votes		1,861			1,379		
Total valid votes		146,605			147,087		
Turnout		148,466	76.1	▼1.4			
CDU hold	Majority	5,956	4.1	▼11.4			

=== 2017 election ===
Federal election (2017): Ahrweiler
Notes:	Blue background denotes the winner of the electorate vote. Pink background denotes a candidate elected from their party list. Yellow background denotes an electorate win by a list member, or other incumbent. A ✓ or ✗ denotes status of any incumbent, win or lose respectively.						
Party	Candidate	Votes	%	±%	Party votes	%	±%
CDU	✓ Mechthild Heil	64,006	42.8	▼12.7	60,937	40.6	▼8.2
SPD	Andrea Nahles	40,944	27.4	▼0.6	34,113	22.7	▼1.9
AfD	Kathrin Koch	13,105	8.8		14,437	9.6	▲4.4
FDP	Christina Steinhausen	12,981	8.7	▲6.3	17,397	11.6	▲6.0
Greens	Martin Schmitt	8,616	5.8	▲0.2	10,059	6.7	▲0.1
Left	Marion Morassi	6,790	4.5	▲0.1	8,519	5.7	▲1.0
Independent	Siegfried Verdonk	1,885	1.3				
PARTEI					1,297	0.9	
FW					1,134	0.8	▲0.1
Pirates	Axel Ritter	1,268	0.8	▼2.2	623	0.4	▼1.7
NPD					415	0.3	▼0.5
V-Partei³					387	0.3	
ÖDP					367	0.2	▼0.1
BGE					267	0.2	
MLPD					37	0.0	0.0
Informal votes		1,992			1,598		
Total valid votes		149,595			149,989		
Turnout		151,587	77.5	▲4.4			
CDU hold	Majority	23,062	15.4	▼12.1			

=== 2013 election ===
Federal election (2013): Ahrweiler
Notes:	Blue background denotes the winner of the electorate vote. Pink background denotes a candidate elected from their party list. Yellow background denotes an electorate win by a list member, or other incumbent. A ✓ or ✗ denotes status of any incumbent, win or lose respectively.						
Party	Candidate	Votes	%	±%	Party votes	%	±%
CDU	✓ Mechthild Heil	77,379	55.5	▲10.0	68,680	48.8	▲8.9
SPD	Andrea Nahles	39,071	28.0	▲3.1	34,660	24.6	▲3.5
Greens	Klaus Meurer	7,813	5.6	▼1.8	9,287	6.6	▼1.9
AfD					7,328	5.2	
Left	Marion Morassi	6,221	4.5	▼1.6	6,569	4.7	▼2.7
Pirates	Gernot Reipen	4,255	3.1		2,920	2.1	▲0.5
FDP	Michael Salzmann	3,313	2.4	▼12.6	7,897	5.6	▼13.3
NPD					1,067	0.8	▼0.1
FW					929	0.7	
ÖDP	Rainer Hilgert	1,439	1.0		555	0.4	▲0.1
PRO					261	0.2	
Party of Reason					261	0.2	
REP					212	0.2	▼0.1
MLPD					34	0.0	0.0
Informal votes		3,103			1,934		
Total valid votes		139,491			140,660		
Turnout		142,594	73.1	▲1.9			
CDU hold	Majority	38,308	27.5	▲6.9			

=== 2009 election ===
Federal election (2009): Ahrweiler
Notes:	Blue background denotes the winner of the electorate vote. Pink background denotes a candidate elected from their party list. Yellow background denotes an electorate win by a list member, or other incumbent. A ✓ or ✗ denotes status of any incumbent, win or lose respectively.						
Party	Candidate	Votes	%	±%	Party votes	%	±%
CDU	Mechthild Heil	62,145	45.5	▼4.1	54,737	39.9	▼3.2
SPD	Andrea Nahles	33,987	24.9	▼11.1	28,973	21.1	▼10.7
FDP	Christina Theresa Steinheuer	20,470	15.0	▲9.2	25,933	18.9	▲6.7
Greens	Frank Bliss	10,094	7.4	▲3.5	11,622	8.5	▲2.5
Left	Gert Winkelmeier	8,310	6.1	▲2.3	10,171	7.4	▲2.9
Pirates					2,204	1.6	
NPD	Hans-Robert Klug	1,527	1.1	▲0.1	1,192	0.9	0.0
FAMILIE					1,123	0.8	0.0
REP					409	0.3	▼0.1
ÖDP					397	0.3	
PBC					288	0.2	▼0.1
DVU					79	0.1	
MLPD					31	0.0	0.0
Informal votes		2,813			2,187		
Total valid votes		136,533			137,159		
Turnout		139,346	71.2	▼7.5			
CDU hold	Majority	28,158	20.6	▲7.0			

=== 2005 election ===
Federal election (2005):Ahrweiler
Notes:	Blue background denotes the winner of the electorate vote. Pink background denotes a candidate elected from their party list. Yellow background denotes an electorate win by a list member, or other incumbent. A ✓ or ✗ denotes status of any incumbent, win or lose respectively.						
Party	Candidate	Votes	%	±%	Party votes	%	±%
CDU	✓ Wilhelm Sebastian	73,883	49.6	▲1.3	64,612	43.1	▼3.0
SPD	Andrea Nahles	53,578	36.0	▼6.4	47,636	31.8	▼1.9
FDP	Ulrich van Bebber	8,697	5.8	▼3.6	18,276	12.2	▲2.3
Greens	Wolfgang Schlagwein	5,748	3.9		8,962	6.0	▼1.4
Left	Harald Jürgensonn	5,616	3.8		6,786	4.5	▲3.7
NPD	Alexis Steidle	1,512	1.0		1,266	0.8	▲0.6
Familie					1,290	0.9	
REP					565	0.4	▼0.1
PBC					416	0.3	▲0.1
MLPD					75	0.1	
Informal votes		3,483			2,633		
Total valid votes		149,034			149,884		
Turnout		152,517	78.7	▼1.1			
CDU hold	Majority	20,305	13.6				
