= Anneliese Augustin =

German politician (1930–2021)

Member of the Bundestag; from Hesse
- In office 6 December 1989 – 26 October 1998
- Preceded by: Dieter Weirich
- Succeeded by: Multi-member district
- Constituency: State list
- In office 13 January 1984 – 18 February 1987
- Preceded by: Carl Otto Lenz
- Succeeded by: Franz-Hermann Kappes
- Constituency: Bergstraße

Personal details
- Born: 24 April 1930 Kassel, Germany
- Died: 3 November 2021 (aged 91) Kassel, Germany
- Party: Christian Democratic Union
- Children: 2

Anneliese Augustin (24 April 1930 – 3 November 2021) was a German politician. From 13 January 1984 to 1987 and from 6 December 1989 to 1998 she was a member of the Christian Democratic Union of Germany (CDU) in the German Bundestag for the state of Hesse for four terms.

== Biography ==
After graduating from high school in Lörrach and studying in Basel and Freiburg, she received her licence to practise pharmacy in 1957. She worked in this profession as a self-employed pharmacist from 1958 until she joined the Bundestag.

Augustin was married and had two children.
