= Gertrud Dempwolf =

German politician

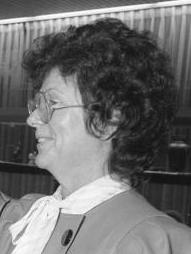
- Dempwolf in 1988

Member of the Bundestag; from Lower Saxony
- In office 22 March 1984 – 26 October 1998
- Preceded by: Horst Schröder
- Succeeded by: Multi-member district
- Constituency: Lüneburg – Lüchow-Dannenberg (1984–1987); State list (1987–1998)

Personal details
- Born: Gertrud Weber; 3 February 1936 Mönchengladbach, Germany
- Died: 29 May 2025 (aged 89) Osterode am Harz, Germany
- Party: Christian Democratic Union
- Children: 1

Gertrud Dempwolf (née Weber; 3 February 1936 – 29 May 2025) was a German politician of the Christian Democratic Union (CDU) and member of the German Bundestag.

== Political career ==
On 22 March 1984, she moved to the Bundestag to replace Horst Schröder, who had resigned, and was a member of the German Bundestag until 1998. On 17 November 1994 she was appointed Parliamentary State Secretary to the Federal Minister for Family Affairs, Senior Citizens, Women and Youth in the Federal Government headed by Chancellor Helmut Kohl. She left office on 26 October 1998 after the 1998 federal elections.
