= Horst Schröder =

German politician (1938–2022)

Member of the Bundestag; for Lüneburg – Lüchow-Dannenberg
- In office 13 December 1972 – 22 March 1984
- Preceded by: Lambert Huys
- Succeeded by: Gertrud Dempwolf

Member of the Hamburg Parliament
- In office 22 April 1966 – 17 January 1973
- Preceded by: Multi-member district
- Succeeded by: Heinrich Zettel
- Constituency: State list

Personal details
- Born: 25 February 1938 Hamburg, Germany
- Died: 6 April 2022 (aged 84)
- Party: Christian Democratic Union
- Education: University of Hamburg; University of Kiel

Horst Schröder (25 February 1938 – 6 April 2022) was a German politician. A member of the Christian Democratic Union of Germany, he served in the Bundestag from 1972 to 1984. He died on 6 April 2022 at the age of 84.
