= Carl Otto Lenz =

German lawyer and politician

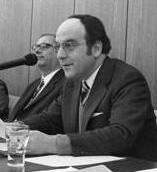
- Lenz in 1973

Member of the Bundestag; from Hesse
- In office 19 October 1965 – 13 January 1984
- Preceded by: Ludwig Preiß
- Succeeded by: Anneliese Augustin
- Constituency: See list: Bergstraße (1965–1969); State list (1969–1976); Bergstraße (1976–1980); State list (1980–1983); Bergstraße (1983–1984)

Personal details
- Born: 5 June 1930 (age 96) Berlin, Germany
- Party: Christian Democratic Union
- Parent: Otto Lenz (father)
- Education: LMU Munich; University of Freiburg; University of Geneva; University of Bonn; Cornell University; Speyer University; Harvard University

Carl Otto Lenz (born 5 June 1930) is a German lawyer, member of the German Bundestag (1965–1984) for the CDU and Advocate General at the European Court of Justice (1984–1997).

== Biography ==
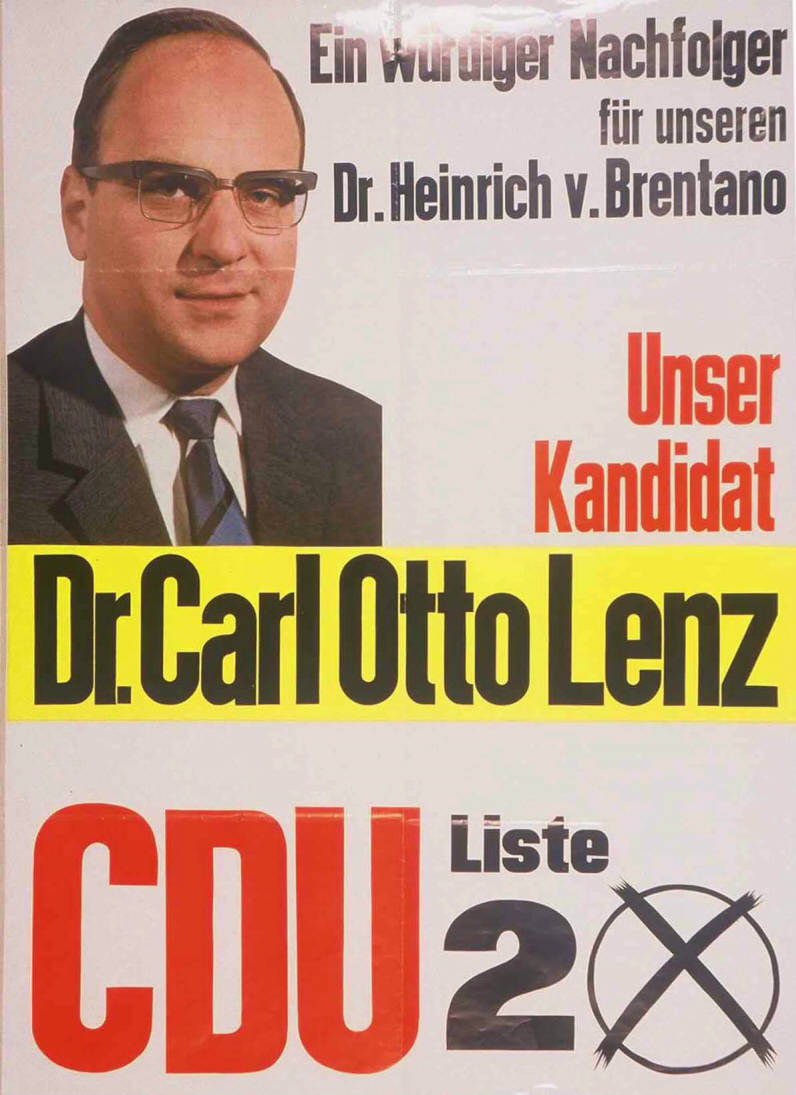
Lenz on a 1965 election poster

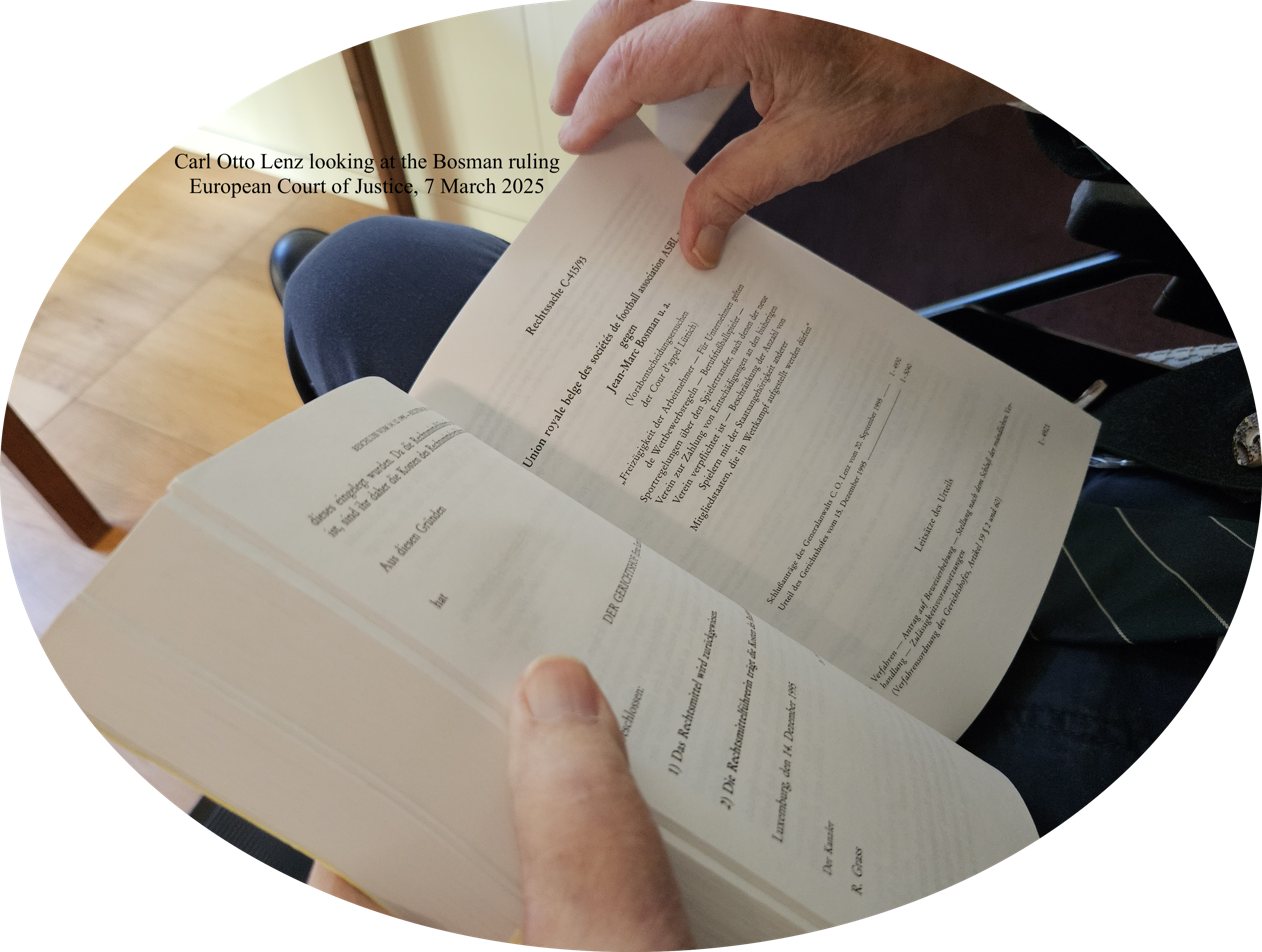
Carl Otto Lenz looking at the Bosman ruling - European Court of Justice, 7 March 2025

Born in Berlin, Carl Otto Lenz is the son of the lawyer Otto Lenz (Secretary of the Federal Chancellery 1951–1953, member of the German Bundestag 1953–1957) and Marie Liese Pohl. In 1948, he graduated from high school in Munich. From 1949 to 1953, he studied law and political science at LMU Munich, the Albert-Ludwigs University of Freiburg, the University of Geneva (Switzerland) and the University of Bonn. In Freiburg, he was a member of the Catholic Student Fraternity KDSt.V. Arminia Freiburg im Breisgau im CV. Lenz later studied at Cornell University in Ithaca, New York, the College of Administrative Sciences Speyer and Harvard University in Cambridge (Massachusetts). From 1961, he taught at the University of Bonn.

In 1959, he became Secretary of the Christian Democratic Group of the European Parliament in Luxembourg; From 1965 to 1984 he was a member of the German Bundestag, representing Bergstraße. For many years he was a member of the Legal Affairs Committee, and he was its chairman from 1969 to 1980.

Lenz is especially committed to Franco-German friendship; he was a member of the Franco-German Parliamentary Group and its chairman from 1969 to 1983.

From 1984 to 1997, Lenz was Advocate General at the European Court of Justice. During this time, he drafted about 400 submissions to the Court of Justice. Lenz is also editor of a handbook and the author of numerous works concerning EC law.

Since 1998, he has been a lawyer in Frankfurt and Brussels.

== Awards and honors ==
- 1976: Great Cross of Merit of the Federal Republic of Germany
- 1980: Officer of the Legion of Honor
- 1983: Grand Officer of the National Order of Merit of the French Republic
- 1987: Bearer of the Hans-Dahs Medal of the German Bar Association
- 1990: Honorary Professor of the Department of European Law at the University of the Saarland
- 1998: Bearer of the Grand Cross of the Order of Merit of the Grand Duchy of Luxembourg

== See also ==
- List of members of the European Court of Justice
