= Wettringen (Münsterland) =

- Municipality
- Coat of arms

- Location of Wettringen within Steinfurt district
- Interactive map of Wettringen
- Location within Germany Location within North Rhine-Westphalia
- Coordinates: 52°12′30″N 7°19′00″E
- Country: Germany
- State: North Rhine-Westphalia
- Admin. region: Münster
- District: Steinfurt

Government
  - Mayor (2020–25): Berthold Bültgerds (CDU)

Area
  - Total: 57.69 km^{2} (22.27 sq mi)
- Elevation: 49 m (161 ft)

Population (2025-12-31)
  - Total: 8,190
  - Density: 142/km^{2} (368/sq mi)
- Time zone: UTC+01:00 (CET)
  - Summer (DST): UTC+02:00 (CEST)
- Postal codes: 48493
- Dialling codes: 02557
- Vehicle registration: ST
- Website: www.wettringen.de

Wettringen (German pronunciation: [ˈvɛtʁɪŋən]) is a village and a municipality in the district of Steinfurt, in North Rhine-Westphalia, Germany.

== Geography ==
Wettringen is situated on the river Steinfurter Aa. It is located in the region Münsterland, approx. 40 km north of Münster and approx. 25 km east to the Dutch border.

=== Division of the town ===
Wettringen consists of multiple smaller districts:

- Wettringen
- Aabauerschaft
- Andorf
- Bilk
- Brechte
- Dorfbauerschaft
- Haddorf
- Klein Haddorf
- Maxhafen
- Rothenberge
- Tie-Esch
- Vollenbrok

== History ==
Wettringen was first mentioned in 838. A historical document says that in 838 Kaiser Louis the Pious donated the church of "Wateringas" to the nun monastery of Herford. This romanesque church was founded in 800 by Charlemagne. It was reconstructed in 1522.

In 1590, during the Dutch Revolt, Spanish Troops plundered Wettringen multiple times. In 1622, during the Thirty Years' War Wettringen was the victim of plunder and pillage again.

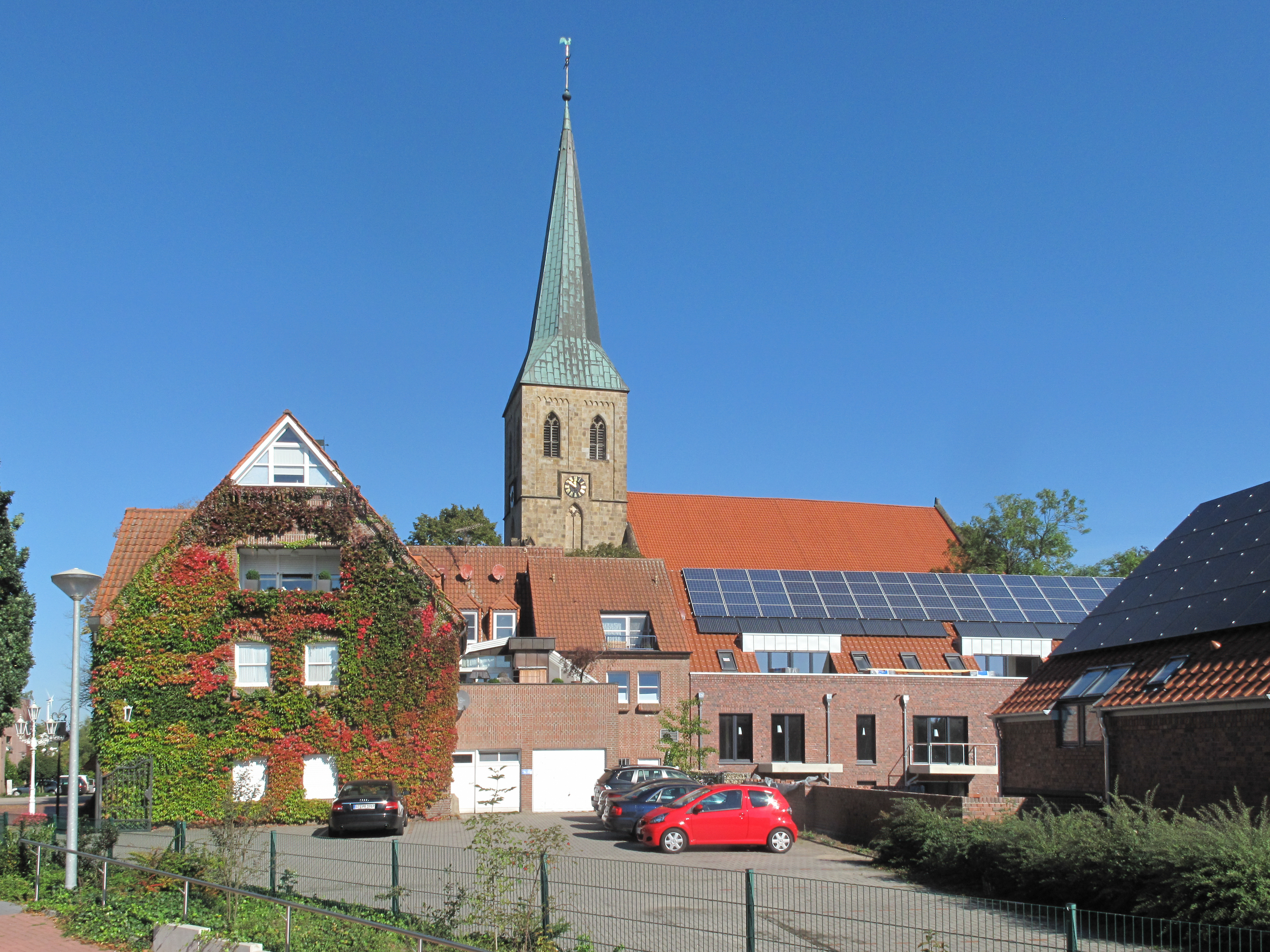
Churchtower (Pfarrkirche Sankt Petronilla) in the street

In 1771, the "Münster Canal" was extended from its former end Clemenshafen in Neuenkirchen to its new end in Maxhafen. It was renamed to "Max-Clemens Canal" after the prince-bishops Maximilian Frederick of Königsegg-Rothenfels and Clemens August of Bavaria. The original plan was a connection between Münster and the Dutch Town of Zwolle, but the last segment was never completed. In 1840 shipping on the canal was given up due to being uneconomic.

In 1861, the old church was torn down and the diocese architect of Münster, Emil von Manger from Oelde, started to build a new gothic revival church. It was completed in 1863 and was consecrated to Saint Petronilla. This church still stands today in the village centre.

The Second World War also left its marks on Wettringen. On March 31, 1945, allied troops came to Wettringen. At the end of the year, approx. 1200 fugitives, predominantly from Silesia, found shelter in the village. In memory of the victims of the World War I and II a memorial was built in 1957 and it was complemented by a stele in 1998 to remind especially to the victims of the Holocaust. An old memorial from 1929 had to be removed due to traffic planning.

=== Coat of Arms ===
The coat of arms of Wettringen is colored in silver, red and gold, the traditional colors of the Münsterland. At the top is a silver bar with a curved red line in the middle. It is the symbol of the Edelherren of Wettringen. Below that is the red bar taken from the coat of arms of the nun monastery of Herford. At the bottom a swan is shown. This symbol is taken from the coat of arms of the Fürst of Bentheim-Steinfurt.

== Population ==
Historical population

Year	Pop.	±% p.a.
1965	5,738	—
1970	5,901	+0.56%
1975	6,089	+0.63%
1980	6,498	+1.31%
1985	6,697	+0.61%
1990	6,802	+0.31%
1995	7,216	+1.19%

Year	Pop.	±% p.a.
2000	7,649	+1.17%
2005	7,908	+0.67%
2010	7,970	+0.16%
2015	8,102	+0.33%
2020	8,271	+0.41%
2025	8,190	−0.20%

Source: Landesdatabank Nordrhein-Westfalen

== Main sights ==
=== Buildings ===
- Beside the Church of St. Petronilla from the 19th century, there is the Ahlers' family farmhouse. This typical westphalian farmhouse is approx. 500 years old. In the 1980s, Wettringen bought this farmhouse from the family Ahlers and moved the building from its old location in Klein Haddorf to its current position in the village centre, being now the oldest building in Wettringen.
- On top of the Rothenberg stands the villa Jordaan. It was built between 1923 and 1925 by Alfred Hensen from Münster and was originally a summer refugium for Bertha van Heek and Jan Jordaan. Today it's the property of the University of Münster and is used for academic meetings and seminars.

== Politics ==
=== Town council ===
The town council of Wettringen after the election of May 2014 is split-up as follows:

- CDU – 13 seats
- SPD – 4 seats
- UWG – 4 seats
- FDP – 1 seat

=== Mayors ===
- 1999–2015: Engelbert Rauen
- since 2015: Berthold Bültgerds

== Twin towns ==
Wettringen's twin towns are Fretin (France), the Dutch village Dalen and the German village Gnoien.

== Notable people ==
- Gabriele Gottwald (born 1955), German politician
- Mickie Krause (born 1970), German singer
