= Mechthild Heil =

German politician

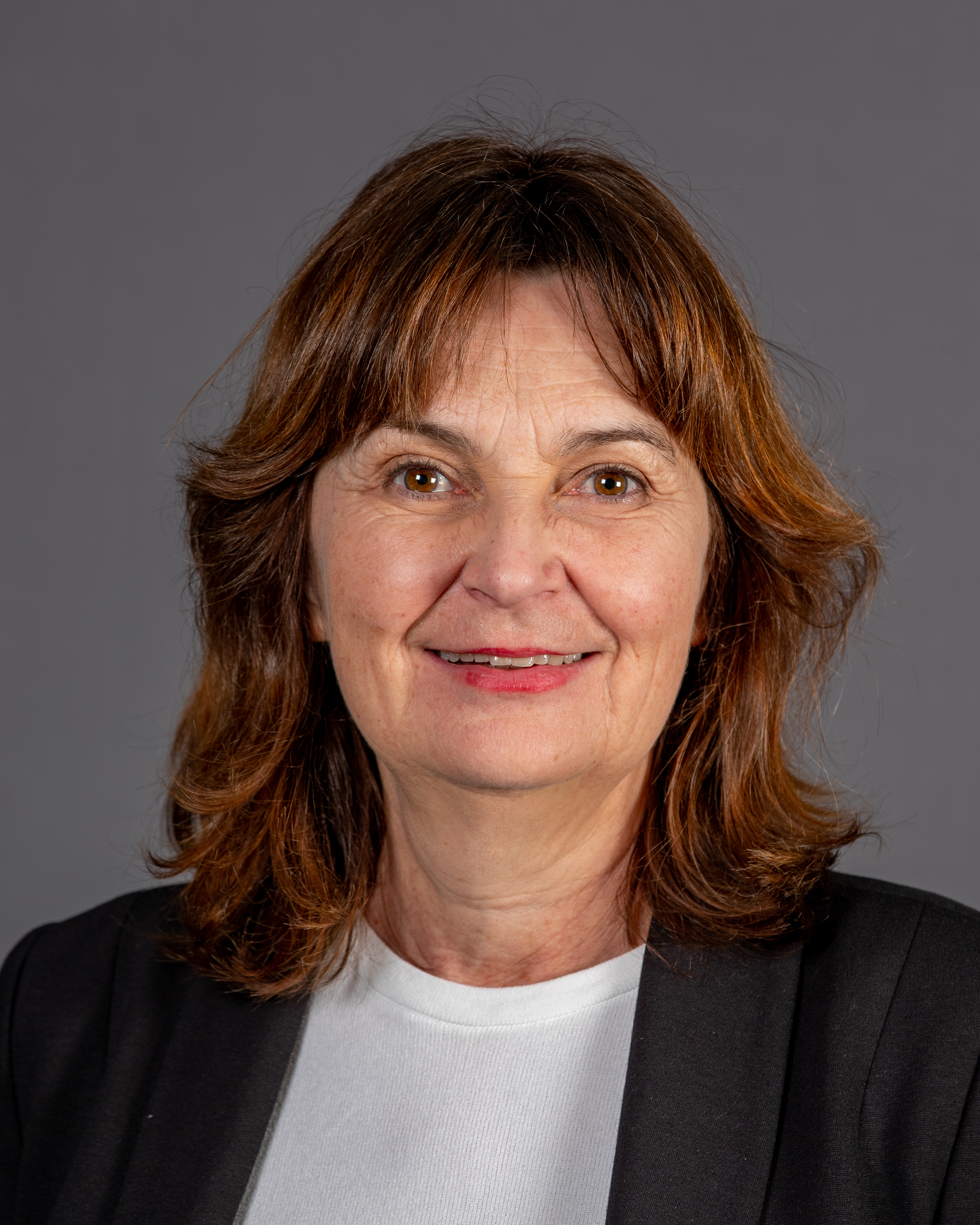
- Heil in 2020

Member of the Bundestag
- Incumbent
- Assumed office 2009

Personal details
- Born: Mechthild Rumpf; 23 August 1961 (age 65) Andernach, West Germany (now Germany)
- Party: CDU
- Children: 3
- Education: University of Kaiserslautern

Mechthild Heil (née Rumpf, born 23 August 1961) is a German architect and politician of the Christian Democratic Union (CDU) who has been serving as a member of the Bundestag from the state of Rhineland-Palatinate since 2009.

== Political career ==
Heil first became a member of the Bundestag in the 2009 German federal election. She served on the Committee on Labour and Social Affairs (2009-2010) and the Sports Committee (2009-2013) before moving to the Committee on Legal Affairs and Consumer Protection in 2013.

In the negotiations to form a Grand Coalition of the Christian Democrats (CDU together with the Bavarian CSU) and the SPD under the leadership of Chancellor Angela Merkel following the 2013 elections, Heil was part of the CDU/CSU delegation in the working group on the environment and agriculture, led by Katherina Reiche and Ute Vogt. In similar negotiations following the 2017 federal elections, she was part of the working group on internal and legal affairs, led by Thomas de Maizière, Stephan Mayer and Heiko Maas. From 2018 to 2021, she chaired the Committee on Building, Housing, Urban Development and Local Government.

Since 2025, Heil has been serving as chairwoman of the German Parliament's Committee on Human Rights and Humanitarian Aid.

== Other activities ==
- Federal Agency for Civic Education (BPB), Member of the Board of Trustees
- Kreissparkasse Mayen, Member of the Supervisory Board

== Political positions ==
In June 2017, Heil voted against her parliamentary group’s majority and in favor of Germany's introduction of same-sex marriage.
