= Alois Mertes =

German politician (1921–1985)

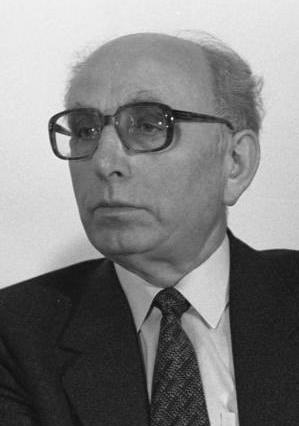
- Mertes in 1983

Member of the Bundestag
- In office 1972–1985

Minister of State at the Foreign Office
- In office 1982–1985

Personal details
- Born: 29 October 1921 Gerolstein, Germany
- Died: 16 June 1985 (aged 63) Bonn, Germany
- Party: Christian Democratic Union (CDU)
- Awards: Order of Merit of the Federal Republic of Germany – Commander's Cross

Alois Mertes (29 October 1921 – 16 June 1985) was a German diplomat, politician and Minister of State at the Foreign Office from 1982 until his death. He was a member of the Christian Democratic Union (CDU) from 1961 until his death.

== Life ==
After graduating from the Regino Gymnasium in Prüm in 1940, Mertes took part in World War II as a soldier. After his release from captivity, Mertes studied law, history and Romance languages and literature at the universities of Bonn and Paris. In 1948, he graduated with a state examination in history and French and received his doctorate in 1951 from the University of Bonn with a thesis entitled France's Opinion on the German Revolution in 1848.

In 1952 Mertes entered the diplomatic service of the Federal Republic of Germany, for which he worked at the Consulate General in Marseille and at the embassies in Paris (1958–1963) and Moscow (1963–1966). He completed a study visit in 1968/69 at the Center for International Affairs at Harvard University, directed by Henry Kissinger, with the study Reflections on Détente: Russia, Germany, and the West. After his return to Bonn, he took over the Department of European Security and Regional Disarmament at the Federal Foreign Office.

From 1969 to 1971, he was chairman of the Catholic League of New Germany.

From 1969 to 1972, he held a lectureship in political science at the University of Cologne.

In 1972, Mertes was state secretary and plenipotentiary of the State of Rhineland-Palatinate to the Federal Government.

From 1972 until his death, he was a member of the German Bundestag. Mertes always entered the Bundestag as a directly elected member of parliament for the constituency of Bitburg. Here he was chairman of the foreign policy working group of the CDU/CSU parliamentary group from 1980 to 1982. As member of the Bundstag he advocated for the release of German war convicts held in Western European captivity, such as Herbert Kappler in Italy and the Breda Two in the Netherlands.

On 4 October 1982, he was appointed Minister of State at the Foreign Office in the federal government led by Chancellor Helmut Kohl.

Mertes was married to Hiltrud Mertes née Becker since 1951. The marriage produced five children, including Michael Mertes and the Jesuit Klaus Mertes.

Mertes died four days after suffering a severe stroke during a panel discussion.

In a series of eight "Alois Mertes Memorial Lectures" (1991–1999), the German Historical Institute in Washington had Mertes's many conceptual contributions to German foreign and security policy honored by renowned scholars of history, politics, and the humanities.

== Publications (selection) ==
- Die Union und Polen. In: Gerhard Mayer-Vorfelder und Hubertus Zuber (Hrsg.): Union alternativ. Seewald Verlag, Stuttgart 1976, ISBN 3-512-00423-7
- Sowjetische Kriterien der Sicherheit und Rüstungskontrolle – Konzeptionelle Gegensätze und Unterschiede zum Westen. In: Erhard Forndran und Paul J. Friedrich: Rüstungskontrolle und Sicherheit in Europa. Europa Union Verlag, Bonn 1979, ISBN 3-7713-0113-0
- Abschreckung sichtbar machen. In: Josef Joffe (Hrsg.): Friede ohne Waffen? Der Streit um die Nachrüstung. Wilhelm Heyne Verlag, München 1981, ISBN 3-453-01524-X
- Der Heilige Doktor von Moskau Friedrich Joseph Haass. In: Drei Deutsche in Russland. Ostermann – Cancrin – Haass (zus. mit Hans Dietrich Mittorp und Dieter Wellenkamp). Turris-Verlag, Darmstadt 1983, ISBN 3-87830-016-6
- Agostino Casaroli – Zeuge des Friedensauftrags der Kirche. In: Herbert Schambeck (Hrsg.): Pro Fide et Iustitia. Festschrift für Agostino Kardinal Casaroli zum 70. Geburtstag. Duncker & Humblot, Berlin 1984, ISBN 3-428-05678-7
- Europe's Role in Central America: A West German Christian Democratic View. In: Andrew J. Pierre (Hrsg.): Third World Instability. Central America as a European-American Issue. Council on Foreign Relations Books, New York 1985, ISBN 0-87609-005-6
- Nuclear Weapons and the Preservation of Peace (zus. mit Karl Kaiser, Georg Leber und Franz-Josef Schulze). In: William P. Bundy (Hrsg.): The Nuclear Controversy. New American Library, New York 1985, ISBN 0-452-00736-4
