= Franz-Josef Berners =

German politician (born 1945)

Member of the Bundestag
- In office 17 January 1986 – 18 February 1987

Personal details
- Born: 27 March 1945 (age 81) Dabringhausen
- Party: CDU

Franz-Josef Berners (born 27 March 1945) is a German politician of the Christian Democratic Union (CDU) and former member of the German Bundestag.

== Life ==
Berners joined the CDU in 1971 and became a member of Leverkusen city council in 1975. Following the death of Helga Wex, he moved to the German Bundestag in 1986, where he remained until the end of the tenth term in 1987. During this period he was a member of the Committee on Legal Affairs and a deputy member of the Committee on Research and Technology.

== Literature ==
Herbst, Ludolf; Jahn, Bruno (2002). Vierhaus, Rudolf (ed.). Biographisches Handbuch der Mitglieder des Deutschen Bundestages. 1949–2002 [Biographical Handbook of the Members of the German Bundestag. 1949–2002] (in German). München: De Gruyter - De Gruyter Saur. p. 1715. ISBN 978-3-11-184511-1.
