= Gabriele Gottwald =

German politician

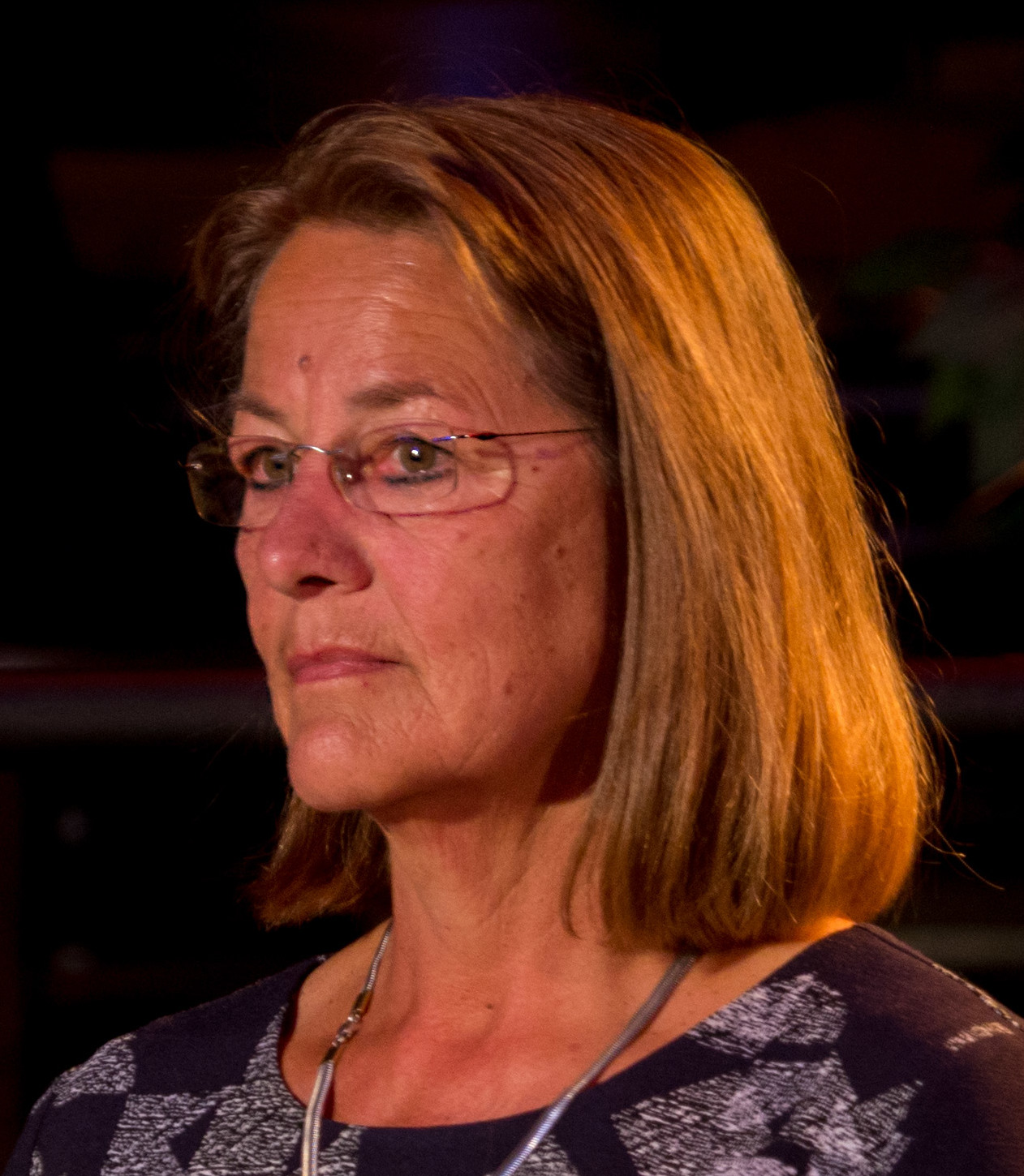
Gabriele Gottwald, 2021

Gabriele "Gaby" Gottwald (born 8 July 1955) is a German politician (The Left), and currently (2019) a member of the Berlin state parliament (Abgeordnetenhaus). Before reunification she served between 1983 and 1985 as a member of the West German Bundestag (national parliament), at that time representing the Green Party. The 1983 election was the first at which Green Party members were elected to the Bundestag. On her first day at the Bundestag she arrived on her bicycle and caused the janitor consternation by insisting on bringing it through the security gate because she was concerned that if she left it outside it might be stolen.

== Biography ==
Gabriele Gottwald was born in Wettringen (Steinfurt), a small country town near the Dutch border north of Münster. She completed her schooling in 1974 and went on to study Social Sciences and Germanistics. In 1984, she also received her teaching diploma. By this time she had already been working for a year on education projects for the IG Metall trades union and in the German Trade Union Confederation. She was also becoming involved in the "so-called" Central America Solidarity movement.

== Politics ==
As part of the preparation for an attempted breakthrough into national politics at the General election scheduled for March 1983, the leaders of the new Green Party were keen to reach out beyond the conventional mainstream of party politics and established student (and other) protesters. It was in this context that Gottwald's name was included on the party's candidate list for North Rhine-Westphalia. In the event the Green Party did indeed break through the 5% threshold in the 1983 election which entitled them to seats in the Bundestag. The party polled strongly in North Rhine-Westphalia and Gottwald was one of the candidates elected. Still aged only 27, she was at the time the youngest Bundestag member. In the Bundestag she served as a member of the Committee for [international] economic co-operation and an alternating member of the Foreign Affairs Committee.

On 4 May 1983 Gottwald joined up with Petra Kelly to make protest by holding up a banner in the Bundestag during a speech by Chancellor Kohl. Their banner, which was photographed by/for the press carried a message asserting that Kohl, as a supporter of US policy in Nicaragua, shared in responsibility for the killing in Nicaragua of the German doctor and aid worker Albrecht "Tonio" Pflaum a few days earlier. Gottwald resigned her parliamentary seat on 31 March 1985, reflecting the party's policy (known as "Abgeordnetenrotation", and subsequently abandoned) of sharing duties and responsibilities. Her seat as taken over by Marita Wagner.

Later she resigned her party membership. Later still, in 2007, she joined a newly reconfigured party, The Left, which had become a party of the mainstream political left, having by now distanced itself, in the eyes of most supporters, from the less appealing aspects of its roots in the pre-1990 German Democratic Republic. Without herself returning to Bundestag membership, for ten years she worked with the party's Bundestag group on pensions policy and social policy more generally.

In 2016, she stood as a candidate for election to the Berlin state parliament (Abgeordnetenhaus). Placed in position 25 on the candidate list of The Left, she narrowly failed to secure election. However, on 31 January 2017, Elke Breitenbach resigned her seat after being appointed to the Berlin senate. Breitenbach's seat in the lower house passed to Gottwald, who has been a member of the assembly since 1 February 2017.

== Conviction and miscarriage of justice ==
In 1983, during a demonstration outside the Bundestag against the stationing of Pershing missiles in West Germany, Gottwald had an altercation with a policeman who blocked her attempt to enter the Bundestag with a party colleague. She had her identity card with her which entitled her to entry, but her companion was not a member of the Bundestag and had no identity card that would have enabled him to enter the complex. The policeman who barred their way was an 18-year-old trainee. Three days later, the trainee policeman was summoned into his boss's office and persuaded to agree that Gottwald had addressed him abusively. A highly abusive set of quotes was concocted which formed the basis of a charge against Gottwald for insulting a policeman. At the trial, the court was unsympathetic to the Green Party peace activists from the outset. There were four prosecution witnesses testifying against Gottwald, but the lead witness was the eighteen-year-old trainee policeman with whom she had actually spoken on the evening in question. The court was persuaded by the policeman's false evidence and Gottwald was fined. It would have been highly unusual at that time for a West German court to disbelieve the sworn evidence of a policeman, especially where the accused was a known peace activist.

The conviction was appealed, but having once concocted his story, and under powerful pressure not to let down his boss who had worked on it with him and was terrified that he might try telling the truth, he stuck to his earlier story at the appeal hearing. The young police trainee was himself under increased pressure because he had recently faced a temporary suspension following a conviction for driving while over the legal blood-alcohol limit. After three and a half years the officer had left the police department and pursued and alternative career, although he continued to find himself regularly interacting with the police. His bad conscience over Gottwald's falsely based conviction never left him, however, and he became convinced that under the pressure of groupthink such cases remained far from unusual. He himself went public with his own confession in 2008.
