= Gerhard Brosi =

German politician

Member of the Bundestag
- In office 29 March 1983 – 3 April 1984

Personal details
- Born: 8 August 1943 Kirchberg / Murr
- Died: 3 April 1984 (aged 40)
- Party: SPD

Gerhard Brosi (8 August 1943 – 3 April 1984) was a German politician of the Social Democratic Party (SPD) and former member of the German Bundestag.

== Life ==
In 1983 he entered the Bundestag via the Landesliste Baden-Württemberg and was then a member of the German Bundestag until his death.

== Literature ==
Herbst, Ludolf; Jahn, Bruno (2002). Vierhaus, Rudolf (ed.). Biographisches Handbuch der Mitglieder des Deutschen Bundestages. 1949–2002 [Biographical Handbook of the Members of the German Bundestag. 1949–2002] (in German). München: De Gruyter - De Gruyter Saur. p. 1715. ISBN 978-3-11-184511-1.
