= Roland Vogt =

German politician (1941–2018)

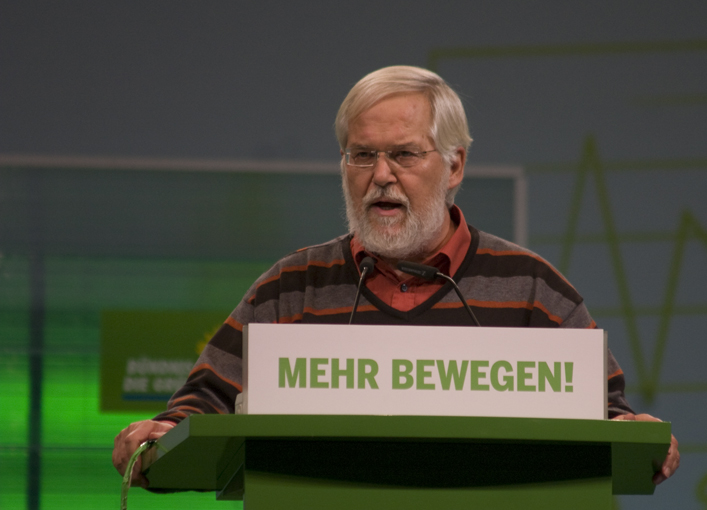
Roland Vogt (2008)

Roland Vogt (German: [foːkt]; 17 February 1941 – 20 May 2018) was a German politician. He was the first member of the German Green Party to be elected to the Bundestag from Rhineland-Palatinate.

Vogt was born in Gelnhausen, Hesse-Nassau. He studied law and political science in Berlin. In 1975, he became involved with the anti-nuclear power movement in southwestern Germany and in succeeding years edited environmental magazines. In 1978, he was one of the co-founders of a regional predecessor to the Green party in Berlin, and campaigned for the European Parliament in 1979.

In the elections of 1983, Vogt was elected to the Bundestag, but resigned two years later because of the then prevailing Green rules of "rotation", which specified that legislators should share their terms with others, rather than serving out a full term. He was succeeded by Willi Tatge, and assumed the post of Rhineland-Palatainate party chair for two years (1986–1987). In the following legislative period, he served as a legislative aide to the Green caucus of the Bundestag. He was also a member of the Parliamentary Assembly of the Council of Europe between 1983 and 1985.

After the reunification of Germany, Vogt was hired by the "traffic light coalition" government of Brandenburg (consisting of the "red" (SPD), "yellow" (FDP), and "green" (Alliance 90/The Greens) parties) to oversee the process of "conversion" — the transition of local economies that had been based on supporting Soviet military bases to a civilian economy. In this job, he drew on experiences from Rhineland-Palatinate, whose economy was heavily influenced by US military bases. The Green party had opposed the US military presence in the 1980s in Rhineland-Palatinate and developed numerous alternative concepts.

In 1996, Vogt joined the Brandenburg central committee of the Green party, and in 2000 was elected party chair of Brandenburg, serving until 2003. In the regional elections of 2004, he campaigned for the Brandenburg parliament, but the Green party failed to reach the 5% minimum required for representation. His attempt to win a spot on the Rhineland-Palatinate Green ticket for the Bundestag election of 2005 failed to find adequate support at the party convention in Mainz on 17 July 2005.

Vogt died on 20 May 2018, aged 77.

== See also ==
- Anti-nuclear movement in Germany
