= Ursula Krone-Appuhn =

German politician

Ursula Krone-Appuhn (25 September 1936 – 17 December 1988) was a German politician (CDU, CSU). Despite being born in the central region that became, in October 1949, the German Democratic Republic (East Germany), her adult life and political career were conducted in West Germany where she served as a member of parliament ("Bundestag Mitglied") between 1976 and 1987. She took a particular interest in defence, and was a member of the parliamentary defence committee.

== Life ==
Ursula Appuhn was born at Nordhausen, a small manufacturing town to the north of Erfurt. Passing the Abitur (school final exam) opened the way for a university-level education, and she went on to study Jurisprudence and Russian. She married Konrad Hermann Krone, son of the government minister (and prominent Adenauer backer), Heinrich Krone. Four children resulted.

== Politics ==
Ursula Krone-Appuhn joined the centre-right Christian Democratic Union (party) in 1958 and switched to the similarly oriented Bavarian Christian Social Union (party) in 1962. In 1973 she took over from Centa Haas as regional chair of the party's "Women's Union", an office she held till 1981.

She was elected to the national parliament (Bundestag) in the 1976 General Election, remaining a member till 1987. As her party's representative on the parliamentary defence committee she took her position seriously, and herself undertook a week's military training at an army base in Munsterlager so as to gain firsthand experience of army life. The issue of women's role in the military was topical at the time, and she followed the conservative party line in being was opposed to the idea of drafting women into the West German armed forces: she nevertheless cited historical precedent to insist that there was no question of women being inherently incapable of operating heavy weapons.
