= Helga Wex =

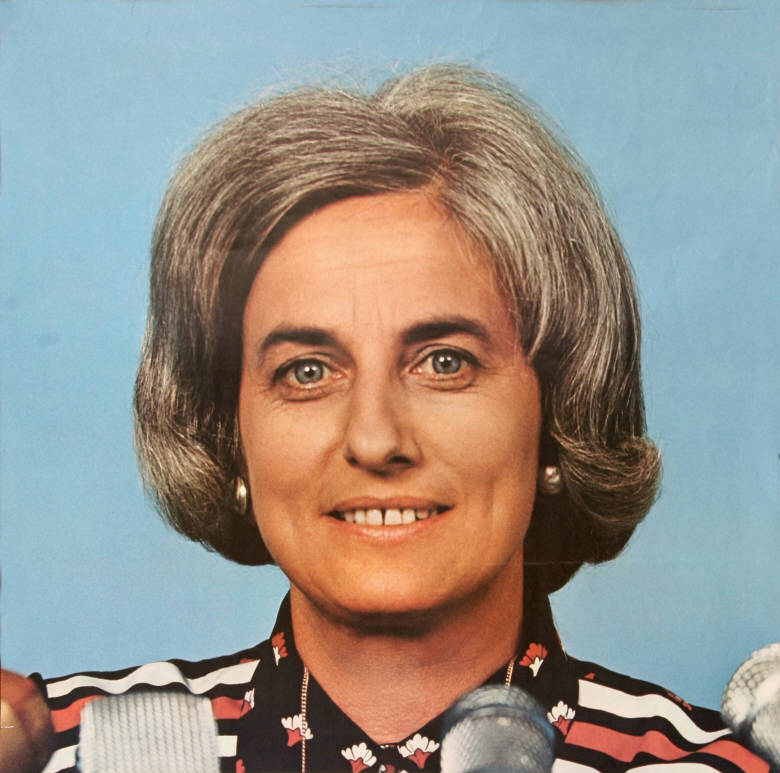
Wex in 1972

Helga Wex (née Schimke, July 5, 1924 Buxtehude - January 9, 1986 Mülheim an der Ruhr) was a German CDU politician.

== Career ==
Helga Wex came from a social democratic family; her father Hugo Schimke was active in local politics for the SPD in Buxtehude. After studying philosophy, Helga Wex (Schimke) completed her doctorate in 1950 in Hamburg on the subject of The farewell motif in German love poetry from the Middle Ages to the end of the 18th century. She then completed additional courses of study at the Europa-Kolleg in Bruges and at the Academy of International Law in The Hague.

From 1953 to 1957, Wex was a ministerial advisor in the representation of the state of North Rhine-Westphalia to the federal government. She joined the CDU in 1961 and was a city council member of Mülheim an der Ruhr from 1961 to 1973. She lived there with her husband Günther Wex and their two children.

She became a member of the 5th German Bundestag on April 28, 1967, which she left at the end of 1969. She rejoined the Bundestag at the beginning of the 7th parliamentary term in 1972 and remained a member until her death on January 9, 1986, in the 10th parliamentary term. She reached the Bundestag via the state list of the North Rhine-Westphalian CDU.

From 1969 to 1977, she was deputy federal chairwoman of the CDU and, as successor to Aenne Brauksiepe, a member of the executive committee.

From 1971 to 1986, she was Chairwoman of the Women's Association of the CDU, today's Frauen Union. In this office, she declared "the end of modesty" for the female section of the CDU and called for greater participation of women in the party. She raised issues such as the compatibility of family and career and fought for the right to submit motions at party conferences for the women's association, which it finally received in 1975.

In 1979, she ran against Richard von Weizsäcker for vice-president of the Bundestag within the party, but lost by a clear margin. In 1983, she became deputy chairwoman of the CDU/CSU parliamentary group.

In 1984, she became coordinator for German-French relations at the Foreign Office and held this office until her death. In this position, she campaigned for the expansion of reciprocal language teaching in France and Germany.

During the first CDU party donation scandal involving illegal party funding via the Staatsbürgerliche Vereinigung, Helga Wex also encouraged, among others the Gerling Group to donate money directly to her CDU district association in Mülheim an der Ruhr, bypassing the tax office and the federal party.

== Honors ==
- Grand Federal Cross of Merit
- Helga-Wex-Platz in Buxtehude
- Helga-Wex-Weg in Mülheim an der Ruhr (December 2022)

== Literature ==
- Frank Bösch: Macht und Machtverlust. The history of the CDU. Deutsche Verlagsanstalt, Stuttgart/Munich 2002, ISBN 3-421-05601-3.
