= Lists of Bundestag members =

Lists of Bundestag members include:

- List of members of the 1st Bundestag
- List of members of the 2nd Bundestag
- List of members of the 3rd Bundestag
- List of members of the 4th Bundestag
- List of members of the 5th Bundestag
- List of members of the 6th Bundestag
- List of members of the 7th Bundestag
- List of members of the 8th Bundestag
- List of members of the 9th Bundestag
- List of members of the 10th Bundestag
- List of members of the 11th Bundestag
- List of members of the 12th Bundestag
- List of members of the 13th Bundestag
- List of members of the 14th Bundestag
- List of members of the 15th Bundestag
- List of members of the 16th Bundestag
- List of members of the 17th Bundestag
- List of members of the 18th Bundestag
- List of members of the 19th Bundestag
- List of members of the 20th Bundestag
- List of members of the 21st Bundestag

== See also ==
- List of Volkskammer members (9th election period)
