= Josef Brunner =

German politician

Josef Brunner (12 August 1928 – 25 January 2012) was a German politician, representative of the Christian Social Union of Bavaria. From 1980 to 1987 and also May–October 1990, he was a member of the German Bundestag.

== See also ==
- List of Bavarian Christian Social Union politicians
