= Johann Junglas =

German politician (1898–1963)

Member of the Bundestag
- In office 7 September 1949 – 7 September 1953

Personal details
- Born: 12 February 1898
- Died: 8 November 1963 (aged 65)
- Party: CDU

Johann Junglas (12 February 1898 – 8 November 1963) was a German politician of the Christian Democratic Union (CDU) and former member of the German Bundestag.

== Life ==
After the Second World War, he was one of the co-founders of the Christian Democratic Party (CDP) in Koblenz, which in 1947 was absorbed into the Rhineland-Palatinate state association of the CDU.

In 1946/47 he was a member of the Rhineland-Palatinate state assembly and subsequently of the Rhineland-Palatinate state parliament until 1951. In the first federal election in 1949 he was elected to the German Bundestag, of which he was a member until 1953. In parliament he represented the constituency of Ahrweiler.

== Literature ==
Herbst, Ludolf; Jahn, Bruno (2002). Vierhaus, Rudolf (ed.). Biographisches Handbuch der Mitglieder des Deutschen Bundestages. 1949–2002 [Biographical Handbook of the Members of the German Bundestag. 1949–2002] (in German). München: De Gruyter - De Gruyter Saur. p. 1715. ISBN 978-3-11-184511-1.
