= Horst Jaunich =

German politician (1930–2026)

Member of the Bundestag
- In office 13 December 1972 – 10 November 1994

Personal details
- Born: 7 June 1930 Breslau, Lower Silesia, Prussia, Germany
- Died: 13 August 2026 (aged 96) Ahlen, North Rhine-Westphalia, Germany
- Party: SPD
- Occupation: Trade unionist

Horst Jaunich (7 June 1930 – 13 August 2026) was a German politician. A member of the Social Democratic Party, he served in the Bundestag from 1972 to 1994.

Jaunich died in Ahlen on 13 August 2026, at the age of 96.
