= Franz Josef Conrad =

German politician

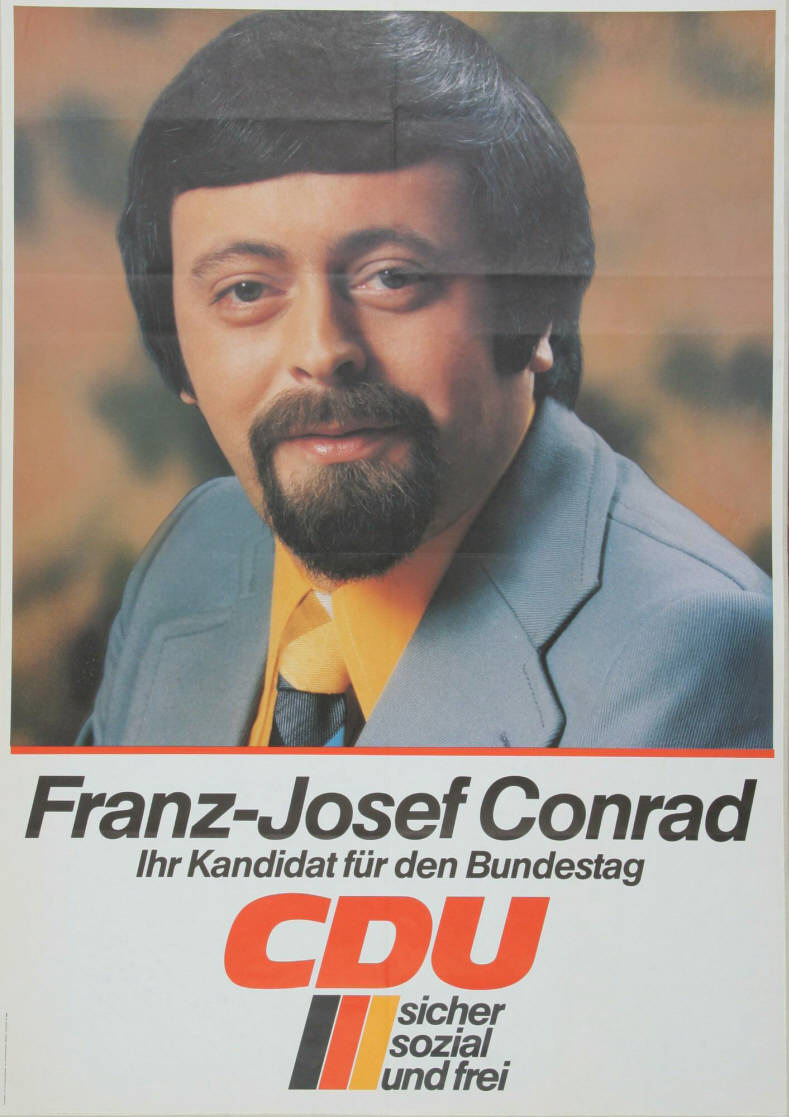
- Franz Josef Conrad's candidate poster for the 1976 federal elections

Member of the Bundestag
- In office 14 December 1976 – 12 September 1985

Personal details
- Born: 12 April 1944 Riegelsberg
- Died: 12 September 1985 (aged 41) Bonn, Germany
- Party: CDU

Franz Josef Conrad (April 12, 1944 – September 12, 1985) was a German politician of the Christian Democratic Union (CDU) and former member of the German Bundestag.

== Life ==
He had been a member of the Junge Union since 1961 and a member of the CDU since 1963. In 1970 he became a member of the CDU's state executive committee and in 1972 deputy state chairman.

From 1974 to 1977 Conrad was a member of the municipal council of Riegelsberg. From 1976 until his death in 1985 he was a member of the German Bundestag on behalf of the CDU. In 1976 and 1980 he was elected via the state list of Saarland; in 1983 he was able to win the direct mandate in the constituency of Saarbrücken II.

== Literature ==
Herbst, Ludolf; Jahn, Bruno (2002). Vierhaus, Rudolf (ed.). Biographisches Handbuch der Mitglieder des Deutschen Bundestages. 1949–2002 [Biographical Handbook of the Members of the German Bundestag. 1949–2002] (in German). München: De Gruyter - De Gruyter Saur. p. 1715. ISBN 978-3-11-184511-1.
