= Karl Deres =

German politician (1930–2007)

Member of the Bundestag
- In office 4 November 1980 – 10 November 1994

Personal details
- Born: 13 February 1930 Sinzig
- Died: 27 March 2007 (aged 77) Sinzig, Rhineland-Palatinate, Germany
- Party: CDU

Karl Deres (13 February 1930 – 27 March 2007) was a German politician of the Christian Democratic Union (CDU) and former member of the German Bundestag.

== Life ==
Karl Deres joined the CDU in 1960. He was a member of the Rhineland-Palatinate state parliament from 1975 to 1980. There he was elected via his constituency. From 1980 to 1994 he was a member of the German Bundestag for four terms. He was elected for the CDU via a direct mandate in Rhineland-Palatinate.

== Literature ==
Herbst, Ludolf; Jahn, Bruno (2002). Vierhaus, Rudolf (ed.). Biographisches Handbuch der Mitglieder des Deutschen Bundestages. 1949–2002 [Biographical Handbook of the Members of the German Bundestag. 1949–2002] (in German). München: De Gruyter - De Gruyter Saur. p. 1715. ISBN 978-3-11-184511-1.
