= Member of the Bundestag =

Deputy of the German parliament

Member of the Bundestag (German: Mitglied des Deutschen Bundestages, MdB) is the official name given to a deputy in the Bundestag (the federal parliament of Germany).

Member of Parliament refers to the elected members of the federal Bundestag Parliament at the Reichstag building in Berlin. In German a member is called Mitglied des Bundestages (Member of the Federal Diet) or officially Mitglied des Deutschen Bundestages (Member of the German Federal Diet), abbreviated MdB and attached. Unofficially the term Abgeordneter (literally: "delegate", i.e. of a certain electorate) is also common (abbreviated Abg., never follows the name but precedes it). However, Members of the Bundestag are more commonly referred to as Bundestagsabgeordneter if the Member of the Bundestag is male or Bundestagsabgeordnete if the member is female. These terms literally translate to "deputy/delegate of the Bundestag".

From 1871 to 1918, legislators were known as Member of the Reichstag and sat in the Reichstag of the German Empire.

In accordance with article 38 of the Basic Law for the Federal Republic of Germany, which is the German constitution, "[m]embers of the German Bundestag shall be elected in general, direct, free, equal, and secret elections. They shall be representatives of the whole people, not bound by orders or instructions, and responsible only to their conscience." An important though not constitutionally required feature of German parliamentarianism is a slightly modified proportional representation.

The 16 federal States of Germany (Länder) are represented by the Bundesrat at the former Prussian House of Lords, whose members are representatives of the respective Länders' governments and not directly elected by the people.

The 2021 German federal election resulted in the most MdBs elected in history, 736.

== See also ==
- Lists of Bundestag members
- Category:Lists of members of the Bundestag
