= List of members of the 8th Bundestag =

This is a list of members of the 8th Bundestag – the lower house of parliament of the Federal Republic of Germany, whose members were in office from 1976 until 1980.

496 members were elected in the 1976 West German federal election.

== Summary ==
This summary includes changes in the numbers of the three caucuses (CDU/CSU, SPD, FDP):

Time	Reason of change	CDU/CSU	SPD	FDP	Others	Total number
1976	First meeting	243	214	39		496
12 July 1978	Herbert Gruhl leaves the CDU/CSU caucus and becomes unaffiliated	242	214	39	1	496

== Members ==
List of Bundestag members.

State	No.	Constituency	Member	Party
Schleswig-Holstein	1	Flensburg – Schleswig	Egon Bahr	SPD
Schleswig-Holstein	2	Nordfriesland – Dithmarschen-Nord	Willi-Peter Sick	CDU
Schleswig-Holstein	3	Steinburg – Dithmarschen-Süd	Kai-Uwe von Hassel	CDU
Schleswig-Holstein	4	Rendsburg-Eckernförde	Heide Simonis	SPD
Schleswig-Holstein	5	Kiel	Norbert Gansel	SPD
Schleswig-Holstein	6	Plön – Neumünster	Horst Jungmann	SPD
Schleswig-Holstein	7	Pinneberg	Reinhard Ueberhorst	SPD
Schleswig-Holstein	8	Segeberg – Stormarn-Nord	Peter Kurt Würzbach	CDU
Schleswig-Holstein	9	Ostholstein	Karl Carstens (Note: Karl Carstens resigned on 29 June 1979.)	CDU
Schleswig-Holstein	10	Herzogtum Lauenburg – Stormarn-Süd	Olaf Baron von Wrangel	CDU
Schleswig-Holstein	11	Lübeck	Björn Engholm	SPD
Schleswig-Holstein	List		Ekkehart Eymer	CDU
Schleswig-Holstein	List		Hans-Jürgen Klinker	CDU
Schleswig-Holstein	List		Karl-Heinz Narjes	CDU
Schleswig-Holstein	List		Hans-Jürgen Stutzer	CDU
Schleswig-Holstein	List		Irma Tübler	CDU
Schleswig-Holstein	List		Johann Christoph Besch (Note: Johann Christoph Besch took office on 3 July 1979, to succeed Karl Carstens.)	CDU
Schleswig-Holstein	List		Günther Heyenn	SPD
Schleswig-Holstein	List		Klaus Konrad	SPD
Schleswig-Holstein	List		Eckart Kuhlwein	SPD
Schleswig-Holstein	List		Lauritz Lauritzen (Note: Lauritz Lauritzen died on 5 June 1980.)	SPD
Schleswig-Holstein	List		Kurt Leuschner (Note: Kurt Leuschner took office on 9 June 1975, to succeed Lauritz Lauritzen.)	SPD
Schleswig-Holstein	List		Walter Peters (Note: Walter Peters died on 8 April 1979.)	FDP
Schleswig-Holstein	List		Werner Zywietz	FDP
Schleswig-Holstein	List		Wolf-Dieter Zumpfort (Note: Wolf-Dieter Zumpfort took office on 30 April 1979, to succeed Walter Peters.)	FDP
Hamburg	12	Hamburg-Mitte	Eugen Glombig	SPD
Hamburg	13	Altona	Horst Gobrecht	SPD
Hamburg	14	Eimsbüttel	Peter Paterna	SPD
Hamburg	15	Hamburg-Nord I	Hans Apel	SPD
Hamburg	16	Hamburg-Nord II	Rolf Meinecke	SPD
Hamburg	17	Wandsbek	Alfons Pawelczyk	SPD
Hamburg	18	Bergedorf	Helmut Schmidt	SPD
Hamburg	19	Harburg	Herbert Wehner	SPD
Hamburg	List		Erik Blumenfeld	CDU
Hamburg	List		Carl Damm	CDU
Hamburg	List		Klaus Francke	CDU
Hamburg	List		Stephan Reimers	CDU
Hamburg	List		Volker Rühe	CDU
Hamburg	List		Helga Schuchardt	FDP
Lower Saxony	20	Emden – Leer	Carl Ewen	SPD
Lower Saxony	21	Wilhelmshaven	Herbert Ehrenberg	SPD
Lower Saxony	22	Oldenburg	Walter Polkehn	SPD
Lower Saxony	23	Delmenhorst – Wesermarsch	Heinrich Müller	SPD
Lower Saxony	24	Cuxhaven	Wolfgang von Geldern	CDU
Lower Saxony	25	Stade	Nicolaus Dreyer	CDU
Lower Saxony	26	Emsland	Rudolf Seiters	CDU
Lower Saxony	27	Cloppenburg	Manfred Carstens	CDU
Lower Saxony	28	Hoya	Ingeborg Hoffmann	CDU
Lower Saxony	29	Verden	Karl Ravens (Note: Karl Ravens resigned on 15 June 1978.)	SPD
Lower Saxony	30	Soltau – Harburg	Herbert Helmrich	CDU
Lower Saxony	31	Lüneburg – Lüchow-Dannenberg	Horst Schröder	CDU
Lower Saxony	32	Lingen	Burkhard Ritz	CDU
Lower Saxony	33	Osnabrück	Karl-Heinz Hornhues	CDU
Lower Saxony	34	Nienburg	Richard Ey	CDU
Lower Saxony	35	Schaumburg	Friedel Schirmer	SPD
Lower Saxony	36	Hannover I	Egon Franke	SPD
Lower Saxony	37	Hannover II	Helmut Rohde	SPD
Lower Saxony	38	Hannover III	Werner Marquardt	SPD
Lower Saxony	39	Celle	Hans Hubrig	CDU
Lower Saxony	40	Gifhorn	Philipp von Bismarck (Note: Philipp von Bismarck resigned on 6 September 1979.)	CDU
Lower Saxony	41	Hameln – Springe	Brigitte Traupe	SPD
Lower Saxony	42	Holzminden	Karl Ahrens	SPD
Lower Saxony	43	Hildesheim	Hermann Rappe	SPD
Lower Saxony	44	Salzgitter	Hans-Jürgen Junghans	SPD
Lower Saxony	45	Braunschweig	Klaus-Dieter Kühbacher	SPD
Lower Saxony	46	Helmstedt – Wolfsburg	Rudolf Hauck	SPD
Lower Saxony	47	Goslar – Wolfenbüttel	Jürgen Linde	SPD
Lower Saxony	48	Northeim	Martin Schmidt	SPD
Lower Saxony	49	Göttingen	Lothar Curdt	SPD
Lower Saxony	List		Ursula Benedix	CDU
Lower Saxony	List		Werner Broll	CDU
Lower Saxony	List		Heinrich Franke	CDU
Lower Saxony	List		Herbert Gruhl	CDU
Lower Saxony	List		Hans Edgar Jahn	CDU
Lower Saxony	List		Hans Hugo Klein	CDU
Lower Saxony	List		Volkmar Köhler	CDU
Lower Saxony	List		Karl-Hans Lagershausen	CDU
Lower Saxony	List		Hanna Neumeister	CDU
Lower Saxony	List		Franz-Josef Nordlohne (Note: Franz-Josef Nordlohne resigned on 4 September 1979.)	CDU
Lower Saxony	List		Eberhard Pohlmann	CDU
Lower Saxony	List		Helmut Sauer	CDU
Lower Saxony	List		Diedrich Schröder	CDU
Lower Saxony	List		Rudolf Sprung	CDU
Lower Saxony	List		Hans-Adolf de Terra	CDU
Lower Saxony	List		Ludolf von Wartenberg	CDU
Lower Saxony	List		Ferdinand Erpenbeck (Note: Ferdinand Erpenbeck took office on 10 September 1979, to succeed Franz-Josef Nordlohne.)	CDU
Lower Saxony	List		Martin Oldenstädt (Note: Martin Oldenstädt took office on 11 September 1979, to succeed Philipp von Bismarck.)	CDU
Lower Saxony	List		Lenelotte von Bothmer	SPD
Lower Saxony	List		Alfred Emmerlich	SPD
Lower Saxony	List		Hans Lemp	SPD
Lower Saxony	List		Helmuth Möhring	SPD
Lower Saxony	List		Paul Neumann	SPD
Lower Saxony	List		Jan Oostergetelo	SPD
Lower Saxony	List		Olaf Schwencke	SPD
Lower Saxony	List		Wolfgang Schwenk	SPD
Lower Saxony	List		Adolf Stockleben	SPD
Lower Saxony	List		Olaf Sund (Note: Olaf Sund resigned on 17 May 1977.)	SPD
Lower Saxony	List		Peter Würtz	SPD
Lower Saxony	List		Karl-Arnold Eickmeyer (Note: Karl-Arnold Eickmeyer took office on 23 May 1977, to succeed Olaf Sund.)	SPD
Lower Saxony	List		Volker Neumann (Note: Volker Neumann took office on 20 June 1978, to succeed Karl Ravens.)	SPD
Lower Saxony	List		Joachim Angermeyer	FDP
Lower Saxony	List		Detlef Kleinert	FDP
Lower Saxony	List		Walther Ludewig	FDP
Lower Saxony	List		Friedrich Wendig	FDP
Lower Saxony	List		Torsten Wolfgramm	FDP
Bremen	50	Bremen-Ost	Ernst Waltemathe	SPD
Bremen	51	Bremen-West	Claus Grobecker	SPD
Bremen	52	Bremerhaven – Bremen-Nord	Horst Grunenberg	SPD
Bremen	List		Reinhard Metz	CDU
Bremen	List		Ernst Müller-Hermann	CDU
North Rhine-Westphalia	53	Aachen-Stadt	Hans Stercken	CDU
North Rhine-Westphalia	54	Aachen-Land	Kurt Koblitz (Note: Kurt Koblitz died on 13 October 1979.)	SPD
North Rhine-Westphalia	55	Heinsberg	Adolf Spies von Büllesheim	CDU
North Rhine-Westphalia	56	Düren	Wolfgang Vogt	CDU
North Rhine-Westphalia	57	Erftkreis II	Peter Milz	CDU
North Rhine-Westphalia	58	Erftkreis I	Rudi Adams	SPD
North Rhine-Westphalia	59	Cologne I	Hans-Jürgen Wischnewski	SPD
North Rhine-Westphalia	60	Cologne II	Katharina Focke	SPD
North Rhine-Westphalia	61	Cologne III	Hubert Weber	SPD
North Rhine-Westphalia	62	Cologne IV	Erich Henke	SPD
North Rhine-Westphalia	63	Bonn	Alo Hauser	CDU
North Rhine-Westphalia	64	Rhein-Sieg-Kreis I	Franz Möller	CDU
North Rhine-Westphalia	65	Oberbergischer Kreis – Rhein-Sieg-Kreis II	Horst Waffenschmidt	CDU
North Rhine-Westphalia	66	Rheinisch-Bergischer Kreis	Franz Heinrich Krey	CDU
North Rhine-Westphalia	67	Leverkusen – Opladen	Bruno Wiefel	SPD
North Rhine-Westphalia	68	Remscheid	Gerhard Braun	CDU
North Rhine-Westphalia	69	Wuppertal I	Adolf Scheu (Note: Adolf Scheu died on 20 December 1978.)	SPD
North Rhine-Westphalia	70	Wuppertal II	Willfried Penner	SPD
North Rhine-Westphalia	71	Solingen	Heinz Schreiber	SPD
North Rhine-Westphalia	72	Düsseldorf-Mettmann I	Heinz Pensky	SPD
North Rhine-Westphalia	73	Düsseldorf-Mettmann II	Uwe Holtz	SPD
North Rhine-Westphalia	74	Düsseldorf I	Gottfried Arnold	CDU
North Rhine-Westphalia	75	Düsseldorf II	Helmut Lenders	SPD
North Rhine-Westphalia	76	Düsseldorf III	Manfred Geßner	SPD
North Rhine-Westphalia	77	Neuss – Grevenbroich I	Heinz Günther Hüsch	CDU
North Rhine-Westphalia	78	Rheydt – Grevenbroich II	Willy Wimmer	CDU
North Rhine-Westphalia	79	Mönchengladbach	Wolfgang Feinendegen	CDU
North Rhine-Westphalia	80	Krefeld	Hansheinz Hauser	CDU
North Rhine-Westphalia	81	Kempen-Krefeld	Hugo Hammans	CDU
North Rhine-Westphalia	82	Moers	Jürgen Schmude	SPD
North Rhine-Westphalia	83	Kleve	Jochen van Aerssen	CDU
North Rhine-Westphalia	84	Dinslaken	Uwe Jens	SPD
North Rhine-Westphalia	85	Oberhausen	Erich Meinike	SPD
North Rhine-Westphalia	86	Mülheim	Willi Müller	SPD
North Rhine-Westphalia	87	Essen I	Erwin Lange	SPD
North Rhine-Westphalia	88	Essen II	Peter Reuschenbach	SPD
North Rhine-Westphalia	89	Essen III	Antje Huber	SPD
North Rhine-Westphalia	90	Duisburg I	Günter Schluckebier	SPD
North Rhine-Westphalia	91	Duisburg II	Hermann Spillecke (Note: Hermann Spillecke died on 5 May 1977.)	SPD
North Rhine-Westphalia	92	Ahaus – Bocholt	Hermann Josef Unland	CDU
North Rhine-Westphalia	93	Tecklenburg	Wilhelm Rawe	CDU
North Rhine-Westphalia	94	Beckum – Warendorf	Heinrich Windelen	CDU
North Rhine-Westphalia	95	Münster	Friedrich-Adolf Jahn	CDU
North Rhine-Westphalia	96	Steinfurt – Coesfeld	Gottfried Köster	CDU
North Rhine-Westphalia	97	Gelsenkirchen I	Heinz Menzel	SPD
North Rhine-Westphalia	98	Gelsenkirchen II	Hans Gertzen	SPD
North Rhine-Westphalia	99	Recklinghausen-Land	Ulrich Steger	SPD
North Rhine-Westphalia	100	Recklinghausen-Stadt	Erich Wolfram	SPD
North Rhine-Westphalia	101	Bottrop – Gladbeck	Johann Wuwer	SPD
North Rhine-Westphalia	102	Höxter	Leo Ernesti	CDU
North Rhine-Westphalia	103	Bielefeld I	Ottfried Hennig	CDU
North Rhine-Westphalia	104	Bielefeld II	Elfriede Eilers	SPD
North Rhine-Westphalia	105	Detmold – Lippe	Erhard Mahne	SPD
North Rhine-Westphalia	106	Paderborn – Wiedenbrück	Rainer Barzel	CDU
North Rhine-Westphalia	107	Herford	Günter Biermann	SPD
North Rhine-Westphalia	108	Minden	Lothar Ibrügger	SPD
North Rhine-Westphalia	109	Lüdinghausen	Wilhelm Peter Stommel	CDU
North Rhine-Westphalia	110	Wanne-Eickel – Wattenscheid	Heinz Westphal	SPD
North Rhine-Westphalia	111	Herne – Castrop-Rauxel	Walter Arendt	SPD
North Rhine-Westphalia	112	Ennepe-Ruhr-Kreis	Hans-Jürgen Augstein	SPD
North Rhine-Westphalia	113	Hagen	Lothar Wrede	SPD
North Rhine-Westphalia	114	Dortmund I	Werner Zeitler	SPD
North Rhine-Westphalia	115	Dortmund II	Hans-Eberhard Urbaniak	SPD
North Rhine-Westphalia	116	Dortmund III	Alfred Meininghaus	SPD
North Rhine-Westphalia	117	Bochum	Karl Liedtke	SPD
North Rhine-Westphalia	118	Bochum – Witten	Herbert Baack	SPD
North Rhine-Westphalia	119	Iserlohn	Hermann Scheffler	SPD
North Rhine-Westphalia	120	Lippstadt – Brilon	Hermann Kroll-Schlüter	CDU
North Rhine-Westphalia	121	Olpe – Meschede	Willi Weiskirch	CDU
North Rhine-Westphalia	122	Arnsberg – Soest	Ferdinand Tillmann	CDU
North Rhine-Westphalia	123	Unna	Manfred Schulte	SPD
North Rhine-Westphalia	124	Lüdenscheid	Günter Topmann	SPD
North Rhine-Westphalia	125	Siegen – Wittgenstein	Hermann Schmidt	SPD
North Rhine-Westphalia	List		Ulrich Berger	CDU
North Rhine-Westphalia	List		Kurt Biedenkopf	CDU
North Rhine-Westphalia	List		Ferdinand Breidbach	CDU
North Rhine-Westphalia	List		Klaus Daweke	CDU
North Rhine-Westphalia	List		Leni Fischer	CDU
North Rhine-Westphalia	List		Ludwig Gerstein	CDU
North Rhine-Westphalia	List		Albrecht Hasinger	CDU
North Rhine-Westphalia	List		Peter von der Heydt Freiherr von Massenbach	CDU
North Rhine-Westphalia	List		Paul Hoffacker	CDU
North Rhine-Westphalia	List		Martin Horstmeier	CDU
North Rhine-Westphalia	List		Herbert Hupka	CDU
North Rhine-Westphalia	List		Agnes Hürland-Büning	CDU
North Rhine-Westphalia	List		Irmgard Karwatzki	CDU
North Rhine-Westphalia	List		Hans Katzer	CDU
North Rhine-Westphalia	List		Herbert W. Köhler	CDU
North Rhine-Westphalia	List		Wilhelm Krampe	CDU
North Rhine-Westphalia	List		Konrad Kraske	CDU
North Rhine-Westphalia	List		Egon Lampersbach	CDU
North Rhine-Westphalia	List		Heinz Landré	CDU
North Rhine-Westphalia	List		Paul Löher	CDU
North Rhine-Westphalia	List		Manfred Luda	CDU
North Rhine-Westphalia	List		Reinhard Meyer zu Bentrup	CDU
North Rhine-Westphalia	List		Paul Mikat	CDU
North Rhine-Westphalia	List		Adolf Müller	CDU
North Rhine-Westphalia	List		Winfried Pinger	CDU
North Rhine-Westphalia	List		Heinz-Jürgen Prangenberg	CDU
North Rhine-Westphalia	List		Gerhard Reddemann	CDU
North Rhine-Westphalia	List		Hermann Josef Russe	CDU
North Rhine-Westphalia	List		Botho Prinz zu Sayn-Wittgenstein-Hohenstein	CDU
North Rhine-Westphalia	List		Manfred Schmidt	CDU
North Rhine-Westphalia	List		Hans Peter Schmitz	CDU
North Rhine-Westphalia	List		Hans Werner Schmöle	CDU
North Rhine-Westphalia	List		Gerhard Schröder	CDU
North Rhine-Westphalia	List		Friedrich Vogel	CDU
North Rhine-Westphalia	List		Günter Volmer	CDU
North Rhine-Westphalia	List		Helga Wex	CDU
North Rhine-Westphalia	List		Dorothee Wilms	CDU
North Rhine-Westphalia	List		Otto Wulff	CDU
North Rhine-Westphalia	List		Helmuth Becker	SPD
North Rhine-Westphalia	List		Bertram Blank (Note: Bertram Blank died on 23 May 1978.)	SPD
North Rhine-Westphalia	List		Willy Brandt	SPD
North Rhine-Westphalia	List		Hermann Buschfort	SPD
North Rhine-Westphalia	List		Bernhard Bußmann	SPD
North Rhine-Westphalia	List		Helmut Esters	SPD
North Rhine-Westphalia	List		Udo Fiebig	SPD
North Rhine-Westphalia	List		Kurt Gscheidle	SPD
North Rhine-Westphalia	List		Karl-Heinz Hansen	SPD
North Rhine-Westphalia	List		Horst Jaunich	SPD
North Rhine-Westphalia	List		Heinrich Junker	SPD
North Rhine-Westphalia	List		Paul Kratz	SPD
North Rhine-Westphalia	List		Volkmar Kretkowski	SPD
North Rhine-Westphalia	List		Franz Müntefering	SPD
North Rhine-Westphalia	List		Wilhelm Nöbel	SPD
North Rhine-Westphalia	List		Annemarie Renger	SPD
North Rhine-Westphalia	List		Karl-Heinz Saxowski	SPD
North Rhine-Westphalia	List		Adolf Schmidt	SPD
North Rhine-Westphalia	List		Erwin Stahl	SPD
North Rhine-Westphalia	List		Waltraud Steinhauer	SPD
North Rhine-Westphalia	List		Manfred Sybertz	SPD
North Rhine-Westphalia	List		Albert Tönjes (Note: Albert Tönjes resigned on 25 April 1980.)	SPD
North Rhine-Westphalia	List		Kurt Vogelsang	SPD
North Rhine-Westphalia	List		Martin Wendt	SPD
North Rhine-Westphalia	List		Kurt Wüster	SPD
North Rhine-Westphalia	List		Klaus Thüsing (Note: Klaus Thüsing took office on 9 May 1977, to succeed Hermann Spillecke.)	SPD
North Rhine-Westphalia	List		Engelbert Sander (Note: Engelbert Sander took office on 26 May 1978, to succeed Bertram Blank.)	SPD
North Rhine-Westphalia	List		Karl-Heinz Walkhoff (Note: Karl-Heinz Walkhoff took office on 31 December 1978, to succeed Adolf Scheu.)	SPD
North Rhine-Westphalia	List		Josef Vosen (Note: Josef Vosen took office on 18 October 1979, to succeed Kurt Koblitz.)	SPD
North Rhine-Westphalia	List		Dieter Schinzel (Note: Dieter Schinzel took office on 5 May 1980, to succeed Albert Tönjes.)	SPD
North Rhine-Westphalia	List		Gerhart Baum	FDP
North Rhine-Westphalia	List		Dieter-Julius Cronenberg	FDP
North Rhine-Westphalia	List		Liselotte Funcke (Note: Liselotte Funcke resigned on 23 November 1979.)	FDP
North Rhine-Westphalia	List		Klaus Gärtner	FDP
North Rhine-Westphalia	List		Hans H. Gattermann	FDP
North Rhine-Westphalia	List		Hans-Dietrich Genscher	FDP
North Rhine-Westphalia	List		Karl-Hans Laermann	FDP
North Rhine-Westphalia	List		Otto Graf Lambsdorff	FDP
North Rhine-Westphalia	List		Werner Maihofer	FDP
North Rhine-Westphalia	List		Ingrid Matthäus-Maier	FDP
North Rhine-Westphalia	List		Jürgen Möllemann	FDP
North Rhine-Westphalia	List		Alfred Ollesch (Note: Alfred Ollesch died on 16 April 1978.)	FDP
North Rhine-Westphalia	List		Rolf Merker (Note: Rolf Merker took office on 20 April 1978, to succeed Alfred Ollesch.)	FDP
North Rhine-Westphalia	List		Eckhard Schleifenbaum (Note: Eckhard Schleifenbaum took office on 26 November 1979, to succeed Liselotte Funcke.)	FDP
Hesse	126	Waldeck	Rudi Walther	SPD
Hesse	127	Kassel	Vacant (Note: Member-elect Holger Börner (SPD) declined to take office.)	
Hesse	128	Werra-Meißner	Egon Höhmann (Note: Egon Höhmann died on 19 January 1979.)	SPD
Hesse	129	Fritzlar	Heinz Kreutzmann	SPD
Hesse	130	Hersfeld	Wendelin Enders	SPD
Hesse	131	Marburg	Gerhard Jahn	SPD
Hesse	132	Wetzlar	Klaus Daubertshäuser	SPD
Hesse	133	Gießen	Erwin Horn	SPD
Hesse	134	Fulda	Alfred Dregger	CDU
Hesse	135	Hochtaunus	Manfred Langner	CDU
Hesse	136	Wetterau	Georg Schlaga	SPD
Hesse	137	Limburg	Benno Erhard	CDU
Hesse	138	Wiesbaden	Horst Krockert	SPD
Hesse	139	Hanau	Gerhard Flämig	SPD
Hesse	140	Frankfurt (Main) I – Main-Taunus	Karsten Voigt	SPD
Hesse	141	Frankfurt (Main) II	Karl Becker	CDU
Hesse	142	Frankfurt (Main) III	Hans Matthöfer	SPD
Hesse	143	Groß-Gerau	Hermann Schmitt-Vockenhausen (Note: Hermann Schmitt-Vockenhausen died on 2 August 1979.)	SPD
Hesse	144	Offenbach	Manfred Coppik	SPD
Hesse	145	Darmstadt	Reinhold Staudt (Note: Reinhold Staudt died on 11 September 1978.)	SPD
Hesse	146	Dieburg	Heinrich Klein	SPD
Hesse	147	Bergstraße	Carl Otto Lenz	CDU
Hesse	List		Richard Bayha	CDU
Hesse	List		Wilfried Böhm	CDU
Hesse	List		Erna-Maria Geier	CDU
Hesse	List		Lothar Haase	CDU
Hesse	List		Hans-Joachim Jentsch	CDU
Hesse	List		Christian Lenzer	CDU
Hesse	List		Helmut Link	CDU
Hesse	List		Erich Mende	CDU
Hesse	List		Gerhard O. Pfeffermann	CDU
Hesse	List		Walter Picard	CDU
Hesse	List		Heinz Riesenhuber	CDU
Hesse	List		Christian Schwarz-Schilling	CDU
Hesse	List		Hermann Stahlberg	CDU
Hesse	List		Walter Wallmann (Note: Walter Wallmann resigned on 14 June 1977.)	CDU
Hesse	List		Hanna Walz	CDU
Hesse	List		Otto Zink	CDU
Hesse	List		Hans Wissebach (Note: Hans Wissebach took office on 15 June 1977, to succeed Walter Wallmann.)	CDU
Hesse	List		Georg Leber	SPD
Hesse	List		Dietrich Sperling	SPD
Hesse	List		Helga Timm	SPD
Hesse	List		Günther Wuttke	SPD
Hesse	List		Fred Zander	SPD
Hesse	List		Wolfgang Schwabe (Note: Wolfgang Schwabe took office after member-elect Holger Börner declined to take office, but later died on 4 January 1978.)	SPD
Hesse	List		Wolfgang Schmidt (Note: Wolfgang Schmidt took office on 9 January 1978, to succeed Wolfgang Schwabe.)	SPD
Hesse	List		Albert Nehm (Note: Albert Nehm took office on 13 September 1978, to succeed Reinhold Staudt.)	SPD
Hesse	List		Christa Czempiel (Note: Christa Czempiel took office on 22 January 1979, to succeed Egon Höhmann.)	SPD
Hesse	List		Frolinde Balser (Note: Frolinde Balser took office on 14 August 1979, to succeed Hermann Schmitt-Vockenhausen.)	SPD
Hesse	List		Klaus-Jürgen Hoffie	FDP
Hesse	List		Wolfgang Mischnick	FDP
Hesse	List		Andreas von Schoeler	FDP
Hesse	List		Richard Wurbs	FDP
Rhineland-Palatinate	148	Neuwied	Heinz Schwarz	CDU
Rhineland-Palatinate	149	Ahrweiler	Johann Peter Josten	CDU
Rhineland-Palatinate	150	Koblenz	Egon Klepsch	CDU
Rhineland-Palatinate	151	Cochem	Waltrud Will-Feld	CDU
Rhineland-Palatinate	152	Kreuznach	Conrad Ahlers (Note: Conrad Ahlers resigned on 7 March 1980.)	SPD
Rhineland-Palatinate	153	Bitburg	Alois Mertes	CDU
Rhineland-Palatinate	154	Trier	Günther Schartz	CDU
Rhineland-Palatinate	155	Montabaur	August Hanz	CDU
Rhineland-Palatinate	156	Mainz	Hugo Brandt	SPD
Rhineland-Palatinate	157	Worms	Willi Fischer	SPD
Rhineland-Palatinate	158	Frankenthal	Rudolf Kaffka	SPD
Rhineland-Palatinate	159	Ludwigshafen	Hans Bardens	SPD
Rhineland-Palatinate	160	Neustadt – Speyer	Georg Gölter (Note: Georg Gölter resigned on 8 July 1977.)	CDU
Rhineland-Palatinate	161	Kaiserslautern	Adolf Müller-Emmert	SPD
Rhineland-Palatinate	162	Pirmasens	Werner Marx	CDU
Rhineland-Palatinate	163	Landau	Albert Leicht (Note: Albert Leicht resigned on 24 October 1977.)	CDU
Rhineland-Palatinate	List		Werner Buchstaller	SPD
Rhineland-Palatinate	List		Peter Büchner	SPD
Rhineland-Palatinate	List		Hugo Collet	SPD
Rhineland-Palatinate	List		Klaus von Dohnanyi	SPD
Rhineland-Palatinate	List		Karl Haehser	SPD
Rhineland-Palatinate	List		Klaus Immer	SPD
Rhineland-Palatinate	List		Willi Peiter	SPD
Rhineland-Palatinate	List		Carl-Christoph Schweitzer (Note: Carl-Christoph Schweitzer took office on 11 March 1980, to succeed Conrad Ahlers.)	SPD
Rhineland-Palatinate	List		Norbert Blüm	CDU
Rhineland-Palatinate	List		Helmut Kohl	CDU
Rhineland-Palatinate	List		Elmar Pieroth	CDU
Rhineland-Palatinate	List		Jürgen Todenhöfer	CDU
Rhineland-Palatinate	List		Roswitha Verhülsdonk	CDU
Rhineland-Palatinate	List		Richard von Weizsäcker	CDU
Rhineland-Palatinate	List		Johannes Gerster (Note: Johannes Gerster took office on 13 July 1977, to succeed Georg Gölter.)	CDU
Rhineland-Palatinate	List		Markus Berger (Note: Markus Berger took office on 25 October 1977, to succeed Albert Leicht.)	CDU
Rhineland-Palatinate	List		Hans Friderichs (Note: Hans Friderichs resigned on 8 November 1977.)	FDP
Rhineland-Palatinate	List		Kurt Jung	FDP
Rhineland-Palatinate	List		Helmut Schäfer (Note: Helmut Schäfer took office on 9 November 1977, to succeed Hans Friderichs.)	FDP
Baden-Württemberg	164	Stuttgart I	Peter Conradi	SPD
Baden-Württemberg	165	Stuttgart II	Ernst Haar	SPD
Baden-Württemberg	166	Stuttgart III	Siegbert Alber	CDU
Baden-Württemberg	167	Ludwigsburg	Matthias Wissmann	CDU
Baden-Württemberg	168	Heilbronn	Egon Susset	CDU
Baden-Württemberg	169	Leonberg – Vaihingen	Peter Petersen	CDU
Baden-Württemberg	170	Nürtingen	Anton Stark	CDU
Baden-Württemberg	171	Eßlingen	Gerd Langguth	CDU
Baden-Württemberg	172	Göppingen	Manfred Wörner	CDU
Baden-Württemberg	173	Ulm	Herbert Werner	CDU
Baden-Württemberg	174	Aalen – Heidenheim	Manfred Abelein	CDU
Baden-Württemberg	175	Schwäbisch Gmünd – Backnang	Dieter Schulte	CDU
Baden-Württemberg	176	Crailsheim	Philipp Jenninger	CDU
Baden-Württemberg	177	Waiblingen	Paul Laufs	CDU
Baden-Württemberg	178	Karlsruhe	Gerold Benz	CDU
Baden-Württemberg	179	Mannheim I	Werner Nagel	SPD
Baden-Württemberg	180	Mannheim II	Hans Georg Schachtschabel	SPD
Baden-Württemberg	181	Heidelberg-Stadt	Karl Weber	CDU
Baden-Württemberg	182	Pforzheim – Karlsruhe-Land I	Lutz Stavenhagen	CDU
Baden-Württemberg	183	Bruchsal – Karlsruhe-Land II	Klaus Bühler	CDU
Baden-Württemberg	184	Heidelberg-Land – Sinsheim	Alfred Hubertus Neuhaus	CDU
Baden-Württemberg	185	Tauberbischofsheim	Karl Miltner	CDU
Baden-Württemberg	186	Konstanz	Hermann Biechele	CDU
Baden-Württemberg	187	Donaueschingen	Hansjörg Häfele	CDU
Baden-Württemberg	188	Waldshut	Norbert Nothhelfer (Note: Norbert Nothhelfer resigned on 6 June 1977.)	CDU
Baden-Württemberg	189	Lörrach – Müllheim	Heinz Eyrich (Note: Heinz Eyrich resigned on 16 October 1978.)	CDU
Baden-Württemberg	190	Freiburg	Hans Evers	CDU
Baden-Württemberg	191	Emmendingen – Wolfach	Albert Burger	CDU
Baden-Württemberg	192	Offenburg	Wolfgang Schäuble	CDU
Baden-Württemberg	193	Rastatt	Bernhard Friedmann	CDU
Baden-Württemberg	194	Reutlingen	Anton Pfeifer	CDU
Baden-Württemberg	195	Calw	Haimo George	CDU
Baden-Württemberg	196	Rottweil	Franz Sauter	CDU
Baden-Württemberg	197	Balingen	Hermann Schwörer	CDU
Baden-Württemberg	198	Biberach	Isidor Früh	CDU
Baden-Württemberg	199	Ravensburg	Claus Jäger	CDU
Baden-Württemberg	List		Rudolf Bindig	SPD
Baden-Württemberg	List		Rolf Böhme	SPD
Baden-Württemberg	List		Andreas von Bülow	SPD
Baden-Württemberg	List		Peter Corterier	SPD
Baden-Württemberg	List		Herta Däubler-Gmelin	SPD
Baden-Württemberg	List		Hermann Dürr	SPD
Baden-Württemberg	List		Horst Ehmke	SPD
Baden-Württemberg	List		Brigitte Erler	SPD
Baden-Württemberg	List		Liesel Hartenstein	SPD
Baden-Württemberg	List		Volker Hauff	SPD
Baden-Württemberg	List		Gunter Huonker	SPD
Baden-Württemberg	List		Klaus Kirschner	SPD
Baden-Württemberg	List		Renate Lepsius	SPD
Baden-Württemberg	List		Rainer Offergeld	SPD
Baden-Württemberg	List		Heinz Rapp	SPD
Baden-Württemberg	List		Wolfgang Roth	SPD
Baden-Württemberg	List		Friedrich Schäfer	SPD
Baden-Württemberg	List		Harald B. Schäfer	SPD
Baden-Württemberg	List		Horst Seefeld	SPD
Baden-Württemberg	List		Hansmartin Simpfendörfer	SPD
Baden-Württemberg	List		Dieter Spöri	SPD
Baden-Württemberg	List		Gert Weisskirchen	SPD
Baden-Württemberg	List		Martin Bangemann	FDP
Baden-Württemberg	List		Georg Gallus	FDP
Baden-Württemberg	List		Martin Grüner	FDP
Baden-Württemberg	List		Helmut Haussmann	FDP
Baden-Württemberg	List		Friedrich Hölscher	FDP
Baden-Württemberg	List		Kurt Spitzmüller	FDP
Baden-Württemberg	List		Manfred Vohrer	FDP
Baden-Württemberg	List		Herbert Czaja	CDU
Baden-Württemberg	List		Ludwig Erhard (Note: Ludwig Erhard died on 5 May 1977.)	CDU
Baden-Württemberg	List		Kurt Georg Kiesinger	CDU
Baden-Württemberg	List		Kurt Wawrzik	CDU
Baden-Württemberg	List		Roswitha Wisniewski	CDU
Baden-Württemberg	List		Gerhard Zeitel (Note: Gerhard Zeitel resigned on 3 September 1980.)	CDU
Bavaria	200	Altötting	Karl-Heinz Spilker	CSU
Bavaria	201	Freising	Albert Probst	CSU
Bavaria	202	Fürstenfeldbruck	Richard Jaeger	CSU
Bavaria	203	Ingolstadt	Karl Heinz Gierenstein	CSU
Bavaria	204	Munich Centre	Hans Klein	CSU
Bavaria	205	Munich North	Hans-Jochen Vogel	SPD
Bavaria	206	Munich East	Rudolf Kraus	CSU
Bavaria	207	Munich South	Erich Riedl	CSU
Bavaria	208	Munich West	Peter Schmidhuber (Note: Peter Schmidhuber resigned on 6 December 1978.)	CSU
Bavaria	209	Munich Land	Franz-Ludwig Schenk Graf von Stauffenberg	CSU
Bavaria	210	Rosenheim	Hans Graf Huyn	CSU
Bavaria	211	Traunstein	Matthias Engelsberger	CSU
Bavaria	212	Weilheim	Franz Josef Strauss (Note: Franz Josef Strauss resigned on 29 November 1978.)	CSU
Bavaria	213	Deggendorf	Franz Handlos	CSU
Bavaria	214	Landshut	Friedrich Zimmermann	CSU
Bavaria	215	Passau	Karl Fuchs	CSU
Bavaria	216	Rottal-Inn	Günther Müller	CSU
Bavaria	217	Straubing	Alois Rainer	CSU
Bavaria	218	Amberg	Heinrich Aigner	CSU
Bavaria	219	Regensburg	Albert Schedl	CSU
Bavaria	220	Schwandorf	Dionys Jobst	CSU
Bavaria	221	Weiden	Max Kunz	CSU
Bavaria	222	Bamberg	Paul Röhner	CSU
Bavaria	223	Bayreuth	Heinz Starke	CSU
Bavaria	224	Coburg	Otto Regenspurger	CSU
Bavaria	225	Hof	Hans Büchler	SPD
Bavaria	226	Kulmbach	Lorenz Niegel	CSU
Bavaria	227	Ansbach	Carl-Dieter Spranger	CSU
Bavaria	228	Erlangen	Klaus Hartmann	CSU
Bavaria	229	Fürth	Werner Dollinger	CSU
Bavaria	230	Nuremberg North	Hans Batz	SPD
Bavaria	231	Nuremberg South	Egon Lutz	SPD
Bavaria	232	Roth	Richard Stücklen	CSU
Bavaria	233	Aschaffenburg	Paul Gerlach	CSU
Bavaria	234	Bad Kissingen	Alex Hösl (Note: Alex Hösl died on 20 March 1977.)	CSU
Bavaria	235	Main-Spessart	Alfred Biehle	CSU
Bavaria	236	Schweinfurt	Michael Glos	CSU
Bavaria	237	Würzburg	Wolfgang Bötsch	CSU
Bavaria	238	Augsburg-Stadt	Stefan Höpfinger	CSU
Bavaria	239	Augsburg-Land	Walter Althammer	CSU
Bavaria	240	Donau-Ries	Karl Heinz Lemmrich	CSU
Bavaria	241	Neu-Ulm	Theo Waigel	CSU
Bavaria	242	Oberallgäu	Ignaz Kiechle	CSU
Bavaria	243	Ostallgäu	Hans August Lücker	CSU
Bavaria	List		Max Amling	SPD
Bavaria	List		Alfons Bayerl	SPD
Bavaria	List		Ludwig Fellermaier	SPD
Bavaria	List		Bruno Friedrich	SPD
Bavaria	List		Friedrich Gerstl	SPD
Bavaria	List		Peter Glotz (Note: Peter Glotz resigned on 16 May 1977.)	SPD
Bavaria	List		Dieter Haack	SPD
Bavaria	List		Horst Haase	SPD
Bavaria	List		Karl Hofmann	SPD
Bavaria	List		Dieter Lattmann	SPD
Bavaria	List		Manfred Marschall	SPD
Bavaria	List		Anke Martiny-Glotz	SPD
Bavaria	List		Richard Müller	SPD
Bavaria	List		Rudolf Müller	SPD
Bavaria	List		Konrad Porzner	SPD
Bavaria	List		Philip Rosenthal	SPD
Bavaria	List		Manfred Schmidt	SPD
Bavaria	List		Rudolf Schöfberger	SPD
Bavaria	List		Wolfgang Sieler	SPD
Bavaria	List		Wilhelm Stöckl	SPD
Bavaria	List		Axel Wernitz	SPD
Bavaria	List		Hermann Wimmer	SPD
Bavaria	List		Hans de With	SPD
Bavaria	List		Otto Wittmann	SPD
Bavaria	List		Franz Josef Zebisch	SPD
Bavaria	List		Uwe Lambinus (Note: Uwe Lambinus took office on 20 May 1977, to succeed Peter Glotz.)	SPD
Bavaria	List		Walter Becher	CSU
Bavaria	List		Franz Xaver Geisenhofer	CSU
Bavaria	List		Fritz Haberl	CSU
Bavaria	List		Peter Wilhelm Höffkes	CSU
Bavaria	List		Reinhold Kreile	CSU
Bavaria	List		Ursula Krone-Appuhn	CSU
Bavaria	List		Eduard Lintner	CSU
Bavaria	List		Ursula Schleicher	CSU
Bavaria	List		Oscar Schneider	CSU
Bavaria	List		Friedrich Voss	CSU
Bavaria	List		Jürgen Warnke	CSU
Bavaria	List		Fritz Wittmann	CSU
Bavaria	List		Erich Ziegler	CSU
Bavaria	List		Klaus Rose (Note: Klaus Rose took office on 24 March 1977, to succeed Alex Hösl.)	CSU
Bavaria	List		Heinrich Reichold (Note: Heinrich Reichold took office on 4 December 1978, to succeed Franz Josef Strauss, but later died on 2 October 1979.)	CSU
Bavaria	List		Ekkehard Voigt (Note: Ekkehard Voigt took office on 8 December 1978, to succeed Peter Schmidhuber.)	CSU
Bavaria	List		Ursula Männle (Note: Ursula Männle took office on 4 October 1979, to succeed Heinrich Reichold.)	CSU
Bavaria	List		Norbert Eimer	FDP
Bavaria	List		Hans A. Engelhard	FDP
Bavaria	List		Josef Ertl	FDP
Bavaria	List		Hildegard Hamm-Brücher	FDP
Bavaria	List		Hans Paintner	FDP
Bavaria	List		Hansheinrich Schmidt	FDP
Saarland	244	Saarbrücken I	Hajo Hoffmann	SPD
Saarland	245	Saarbrücken II	Alwin Brück	SPD
Saarland	246	Saarlouis	Hans-Werner Müller	CDU
Saarland	247	St. Wendel	Werner Zeyer (Note: Werner Zeyer resigned on 10 July 1979.)	CDU
Saarland	248	Homburg	Werner Wilhelm	SPD
Saarland	List		Franz Josef Conrad	CDU
Saarland	List		Doris Pack	CDU
Saarland	List		Rudolf Blügel (Note: Rudolf Blügel took office on 20 July 1979, to succeed Werner Zeyer.)	CDU
Saarland	List		Helwin Peter	SPD
West Berlin			Franz Amrehn	CDU
West Berlin			Lieselotte Berger	CDU
West Berlin			Johann Baptist Gradl	CDU
West Berlin			Peter Kittelmann	CDU
West Berlin			Gerhard Kunz	CDU
West Berlin			Peter Lorenz (Note: Peter Lorenz resigned on 23 February 1977.)	CDU
West Berlin			Rudolf Luster	CDU
West Berlin			Johannes Müller	CDU
West Berlin			Liselotte Pieser	CDU
West Berlin			Günter Straßmeir	CDU
West Berlin			Jürgen Wohlrabe (Note: Jürgen Wohlrabe resigned on 11 September 1979.)	CDU
West Berlin			Gero Pfennig (Note: Gero Pfennig took office on 24 February 1977, to succeed Peter Lorenz.)	CDU
West Berlin			Dietrich Bahner (Note: Dietrich Bahner took office on 12 September 1979, to succeed Jürgen Wohlrabe.)	CDU
West Berlin			Reinhard Bühling	SPD
West Berlin			Nils Diederich	SPD
West Berlin			Ulrich Dübber	SPD
West Berlin			Jürgen Egert	SPD
West Berlin			Lothar Löffler	SPD
West Berlin			Peter Männing	SPD
West Berlin			Kurt Mattick	SPD
West Berlin			Marie Schlei	SPD
West Berlin			Waldemar Schulze	SPD
West Berlin			Hellmut Sieglerschmidt	SPD
West Berlin			Hans-Günter Hoppe	FDP

== See also ==
- Politics of Germany
- List of Bundestag Members
