= Karlsruhe-Stadt (electoral district) =

Federal electoral district of Germany

271 Karlsruhe-Stadt
- Electoral district for the Bundestag
- Karlsruhe-Stadt in 2025
- State: Baden-Württemberg
- Population: 312,100 (2019)
- Electorate: 205,608 (2021)
- Major settlements: Karlsruhe
- Area: 173.4 km^{2}

Current electoral district
- Created: 1949
- Party: GRÜNE
- Member: Zoe Mayer
- Elected: 2021, 2025

Karlsruhe-Stadt (English: Karlsruhe City) is an electoral constituency (German: Wahlkreis) represented in the Bundestag. It elects one member via first-past-the-post voting. Under the current constituency numbering system, it is designated as constituency 271. It is located in northwestern Baden-Württemberg, comprising the city of Karlsruhe.

Karlsruhe-Stadt was created for the inaugural 1949 federal election. Since 2021, it has been represented by Zoe Mayer of the Alliance 90/The Greens.

== Geography ==
Karlsruhe-Stadt is located in northwestern Baden-Württemberg. As of the 2021 federal election, it is coterminous with the independent city of Karlsruhe.

== History ==
Karlsruhe-Stadt was created in 1949. In the 1965 through 1976 elections, it was named Karlsruhe. In the 1949 election, it was Württemberg-Baden Landesbezirk Baden constituency 1 in the number system. In the 1953 through 1961 elections, it was number 175. In the 1965 through 1976 elections, it was number 178. In the 1980 through 1998 elections, it was number 175. In the 2002 and 2005 elections, it was number 272. Since the 2009 election, it has been number 271.

Originally, the constituency was coterminous with the independent city of Karlsruhe. In the 1998 election, it also included the municipality of Rheinstetten from the Landkreis Karlsruhe district. Since the 2002 election, it has again been coterminous with the city of Karlsruhe.

Election	No.	Name	Borders
1949	1	Karlsruhe-Stadt	Karlsruhe city
1953	175	Karlsruhe-Stadt	Karlsruhe city
1957	175	Karlsruhe-Stadt	Karlsruhe city
1961	175	Karlsruhe-Stadt	Karlsruhe city
1965	178	Karlsruhe	Karlsruhe city
1969	178	Karlsruhe	Karlsruhe city
1972	178	Karlsruhe	Karlsruhe city
1976	178	Karlsruhe	Karlsruhe city
1980	175	Karlsruhe-Stadt	Karlsruhe city
1983	175	Karlsruhe-Stadt	Karlsruhe city
1987	175	Karlsruhe-Stadt	Karlsruhe city
1990	175	Karlsruhe-Stadt	Karlsruhe city
1994	175	Karlsruhe-Stadt	Karlsruhe city
1998	175	Karlsruhe-Stadt	Karlsruhe city; Landkreis Karlsruhe district (only Rheinstetten municipality)
2002	272	Karlsruhe-Stadt	Karlsruhe city
2005	272	Karlsruhe-Stadt	Karlsruhe city
2009	271	Karlsruhe-Stadt	Karlsruhe city
2013	271	Karlsruhe-Stadt	Karlsruhe city
2017	271	Karlsruhe-Stadt	Karlsruhe city
2021	271	Karlsruhe-Stadt	Karlsruhe city
2025	271	Karlsruhe-Stadt	Karlsruhe city

== Members ==
The constituency was first represented by Hermann Veit of the Social Democratic Party (SPD) from 1949 to 1953. It was won by Friedrich Werber of the Christian Democratic Union (CDU) in 1953, who served until 1961. He was succeeded by fellow CDU member Max Güde from 1961 to 1969. Peter Corterier of the SPD was elected in 1969 and re-elected in 1972. Gerold Benz of the CDU won the constituency in 1976, but former member Corterier regained it in 1980. Rudolf Ruf of the CDU was representative from 1983 to 1990, followed by fellow CDU member Norbert Rieder from 1990 to 1998. Brigitte Wimmer of the SPD was elected in 1998 and re-elected in 2002. Ingo Wellenreuther of the CDU was representative from 2005 to 2021. Zoe Mayer won the constituency for the Greens in 2021.

Election	Member	Party	%
1949	Hermann Veit	SPD	37.0
1953	Friedrich Werber	CDU	48.0
1957	Friedrich Werber	CDU	48.8
1961	Max Güde	CDU	45.9
1965	Max Güde	CDU	46.1
1969	Peter Corterier	SPD	45.3
1972	Peter Corterier	SPD	50.3
1976	Gerold Benz	CDU	47.5
1980	Peter Corterier	SPD	45.2
1983	Rudolf Ruf	CDU	49.0
1987	Rudolf Ruf	CDU	47.6
1990	Norbert Rieder	CDU	44.9
1994	Norbert Rieder	CDU	41.5
1998	Brigitte Wimmer	SPD	40.0
2002	Brigitte Wimmer	SPD	40.0
2005	Ingo Wellenreuther	CDU	41.3
2009	Ingo Wellenreuther	CDU	38.1
2013	Ingo Wellenreuther	CDU	39.5
2017	Ingo Wellenreuther	CDU	28.6
2021	Zoe Mayer	GRÜNE	30.0
2025	Zoe Mayer	GRÜNE	30.6

== Election results ==
=== 2025 election ===
Federal election (2025): Karlsruhe-Stadt
Notes:	Blue background denotes the winner of the electorate vote. Pink background denotes a candidate elected from their party list. Yellow background denotes an electorate win by a list member, or other incumbent. A ✓ or ✗ denotes status of any incumbent, win or lose respectively.						
Party	Candidate	Votes	%	±%	Party votes	%	±%
Greens	✓ Zoe Mayer	5,305	30.6	▲0.6	40,424	24.1	▼3.7
CDU	Tobias Bunk	39,599	23.7	▲4.1	37,646	22.4	▲4.8
SPD	✗ Parsa Marvi	25,553	15.3	▼6.0	26,164	15.6	▼5.8
AfD	Marc Bernhard	22,985	13.7	▲6.9	22,677	13.5	▲6.7
Left	Marcel Bauer	13,354	8.0	▲2.9	18,801	11.2	▲5.6
FDP	Philipp Berner	6,399	3.8	▼6.22	8,657	5.2	▼7.9
dieBasis				▼2.0	352	0.2	▼1.6
PARTEI	Frank Trippel	1,945	1.2	▼0.6	1,020	0.6	▼0.6
Tierschutzpartei					1,393	0.8	▼0.2
FW	Edgar Krez	2,015	1.2	▲0.1	993	0.3	▼0.3
Volt	Fabian Gaukel	4,020	2.4	▲1.4	2,745	1.6	▲0.8
Team Todenhöfer							▼0.5
Pirates							▼0.4
Humanists				▼0.5			▼0.3
ÖDP				▼0.4	223	0.1	▼0.1
Bündnis C				▼0.3	269	0.2	Steady
BD					139	0.1	0.0
Gesundheitsforschung							▼0.1
Bürgerbewegung							▼0.3
MLPD	Jonas Schraven	255	0.2	0.0	95	0.1	0.0
BSW					6,246	3.7	
Informal votes		1,126			712		
Total valid votes		167,430			167,844		
Turnout		168,556	83.1	▲5.5			
Greens hold	Majority			▲0.6			

=== 2021 election ===
Federal election (2021): Karlsruhe-Stadt
Notes:	Blue background denotes the winner of the electorate vote. Pink background denotes a candidate elected from their party list. Yellow background denotes an electorate win by a list member, or other incumbent. A ✓ or ✗ denotes status of any incumbent, win or lose respectively.						
Party	Candidate	Votes	%	±%	Party votes	%	±%
Greens	Zoe Mayer	47,473	30.0	▲12.4	44,011	27.8	▲9.5
SPD	Parsa Marvi	33,630	21.3	▼2.4	33,828	21.3	▲4.5
CDU	✗ Ingo Wellenreuther	30,921	19.5	▼9.0	27,998	17.7	▼10.2
FDP	Michael Theurer	15,793	10.0	▲1.4	20,615	13.0	▲1.0
AfD	Marc Bernhard	10,811	6.8	▼3.2	10,774	6.8	▼3.6
Left	Michel Brandt	7,956	5.0	▼2.5	8,910	5.6	▼4.0
dieBasis	Martin Buchfink	3,152	2.0		2,863	1.8	
PARTEI	Daniel Barth	2,811	1.8	0.0	1,851	1.2	▼0.2
Tierschutzpartei					1,608	1.0	0.0
FW	Bernhard Barutta	1,723	1.1		1,438	0.9	▲0.5
Volt	Tassi Giannikopoulos	1,547	1.0		1,313	0.8	
Team Todenhöfer					785	0.5	
Pirates					622	0.4	▼0.2
Humanists	Andreas Schäfer	749	0.5		463	0.3	
ÖDP	Franz-Josef Behr	605	0.4		385	0.2	0.0
KlimalisteBW	Markus Schmoll	456	0.3				
Bündnis C	Klaus-Jürgen Raphael	452	0.3		322	0.2	
DiB					182	0.1	▼0.2
Gesundheitsforschung					138	0.1	
Bürgerbewegung					101	0.1	
MLPD	Jonas Dachner	162	0.1	▼0.1	89	0.1	0.0
NPD					71	0.0	▼0.1
DKP					44	0.0	0.0
Bündnis 21					34	0.0	
LKR					23	0.0	
Informal votes		1,350			1,123		
Total valid votes		158,241			158,468		
Turnout		159,591	77.6	0.0			
Greens gain from CDU	Majority	13,843	8.7				

=== 2017 election ===
Federal election (2017): Karlsruhe-Stadt
Notes:	Blue background denotes the winner of the electorate vote. Pink background denotes a candidate elected from their party list. Yellow background denotes an electorate win by a list member, or other incumbent. A ✓ or ✗ denotes status of any incumbent, win or lose respectively.						
Party	Candidate	Votes	%	±%	Party votes	%	±%
CDU	✓ Ingo Wellenreuther	45,821	28.5	▼10.9	44,776	27.8	▼9.7
SPD	Parsa Marvi	37,924	23.6	▼6.0	27,044	16.8	▼5.9
Greens	Sylvia Kotting-Uhl	28,268	17.6	▲3.9	29,408	18.3	▲3.3
AfD	Marc Bernhard	16,073	10.0	▲6.0	16,741	10.4	▲4.8
FDP	Michael Theurer	13,829	8.6	▲5.4	19,251	12.0	▲5.9
Left	Michel Brandt	12,155	7.6	▲2.7	15,452	9.6	▲3.6
PARTEI	Stefan Glause	2,899	1.8		2,179	1.4	
Tierschutzpartei	Robin Margic	2,412	1.5		1,595	1.0	▲0.2
Pirates					999	0.6	▼3.4
Independent	Bruno Mayer	724	0.5				
FW					600	0.4	▼0.1
DiB					505	0.3	
BGE					442	0.3	
ÖDP					438	0.3	0.0
Tierschutzallianz					346	0.2	
DM					263	0.2	
V-Partei³					240	0.1	
Menschliche Welt					191	0.1	
NPD					188	0.1	▼0.5
MLPD	Jonas Dachner	250	0.2		142	0.1	0.0
DIE RECHTE	Uwe Kasper	151	0.1		78	0.0	
DKP					33	0.0	
Informal votes		1,633			1,228		
Total valid votes		160,506			160,911		
Turnout		162,139	77.6	▲4.7			
CDU hold	Majority	7,897	4.9	▼5.0			

=== 2013 election ===
Federal election (2013): Karlsruhe-Stadt
Notes:	Blue background denotes the winner of the electorate vote. Pink background denotes a candidate elected from their party list. Yellow background denotes an electorate win by a list member, or other incumbent. A ✓ or ✗ denotes status of any incumbent, win or lose respectively.						
Party	Candidate	Votes	%	±%	Party votes	%	±%
CDU	✓ Ingo Wellenreuther	58,452	39.5	▲1.4	55,791	37.5	▲8.9
SPD	Parsa Marvi	43,866	29.6	▲2.9	33,785	22.7	▲2.1
Greens	Sylvia Kotting-Uhl	20,337	13.7	▼1.4	22,263	15.0	▼3.4
Left	Karin Binder	7,254	4.9	▼2.2	8,933	6.0	▼2.3
AfD	Marc Jongen	5,983	4.0		8,334	5.6	
Pirates	Martin Bartsch	5,149	3.5	▲0.4	6,009	4.0	▲0.9
FDP	Heinz Golombeck	4,714	3.2	▼5.2	8,978	6.0	▼11.4
Tierschutzpartei					1,111	0.7	▲0.1
FW	Peter Rapp	992	0.7		724	0.5	
NPD	Heiko Köhler	912	0.6	▼0.5	853	0.6	▼0.3
ÖDP					423	0.3	0.0
REP	Rainer Haag	452	0.3		352	0.2	▼0.1
RENTNER					250	0.2	
PBC					205	0.1	▼0.2
Volksabstimmung					185	0.1	0.0
Party of Reason					116	0.1	
MLPD					93	0.1	0.0
PRO					90	0.1	
BIG					77	0.1	
BüSo					34	0.0	0.0
Informal votes		1,939			1,444		
Total valid votes		148,111			148,606		
Turnout		150,050	72.9	▲1.8			
CDU hold	Majority	14,586	9.9	▼1.5			

=== 2009 election ===
Federal election (2009): Karlsruhe-Stadt
Notes:	Blue background denotes the winner of the electorate vote. Pink background denotes a candidate elected from their party list. Yellow background denotes an electorate win by a list member, or other incumbent. A ✓ or ✗ denotes status of any incumbent, win or lose respectively.						
Party	Candidate	Votes	%	±%	Party votes	%	±%
CDU	✓ Ingo Wellenreuther	53,872	38.1	▼3.3	40,566	28.6	▼4.2
SPD	Johannes Jung	37,845	26.7	▼12.7	29,227	20.6	▼11.4
Greens	Sylvia Kotting-Uhl	21,452	15.2	▲6.0	26,051	18.4	▲3.7
FDP	Heinz Golombeck	11,845	8.4	▲4.1	24,654	17.4	▲5.4
Left	Karin Binder	10,034	7.1	▲2.8	11,807	8.3	▲3.4
Pirates	Dennis Laurisch	4,359	3.1		5,008	3.5	
NPD	Siegfried Gärttner	1,534	1.1	▼0.4	1,295	0.9	▼0.2
Tierschutzpartei					894	0.6	
REP					544	0.4	▼0.2
PBC					444	0.3	0.0
ÖDP					405	0.3	
DIE VIOLETTEN					254	0.2	
Volksabstimmung					205	0.1	
MLPD	Gabriele Maria Conrad	234	0.2		133	0.1	0.0
Independent	Rainer Leyendecker	215	0.2				
Independent	Helmut Günther Ringger	101	0.1				
DVU					76	0.1	
BüSo					75	0.1	0.0
ADM					28	0.0	
Informal votes		2,030			1,855		
Total valid votes		141,491			141,666		
Turnout		143,521	71.1	▼5.0			
CDU hold	Majority	16,027	11.4	▲9.4			

=== 2005 election ===
Federal election (2005):Karlsruhe-Stadt
Notes:	Blue background denotes the winner of the electorate vote. Pink background denotes a candidate elected from their party list. Yellow background denotes an electorate win by a list member, or other incumbent. A ✓ or ✗ denotes status of any incumbent, win or lose respectively.						
Party	Candidate	Votes	%	±%	Party votes	%	±%
CDU	Ingo Wellenreuther	61,000	41.3	▲6.3	48,557	32.9	▼2.6
SPD	Johannes Jung	58,201	39.4	▼0.5	47,399	32.1	▼5.1
Greens	Sylvia Kotting-Uhl	13,478	9.1	▲0.3	21,778	14.7	▲0.3
Left	Karin Binder	6,333	4.3	▲3.0	7,333	4.96	▲3.4
FDP	Simone Szurmant	6,288	4.3	▼9.7	17,804	12.0	▲3.6
NPD	Albert Baumgärtner	2,241	1.5	▲0.7	1,638	1.1	▲0.7
GRAUEN					881	0.6	▲0.4
Familie					863	0.6	
REP					833	0.6	▲010
PBC					469	0.3	0.0
MLPD					138	0.1	
BüSo					121	0.1	
Informal votes		2,609			2,336		
Total valid votes		147,541			147,814		
Turnout		150,150	74.1	▼3.0			
CDU gain from SPD	Majority	2,799	1.7				
