= Besch =

Besch may refer to:

- Perl, Saarland
- Mount Besch

== Surname ==
- Anthony Besch (1924–2002), English opera and theatre director
- Bibi Besch (1942–1996), Austrian-born American actress
- François Besch (born 1963), Luxembourgish photographer
- Johann Christoph Besch (1937–2011), German politician
- Nicolas Besch (born 1984), French ice hockey defenceman
