= Zoe Mayer =

German politician (born 1995)

Zoe Mayer MdB

Member of the Bundestag; for Karlsruhe-Stadt
- Incumbent
- Assumed office 26 October 2021
- Preceded by: Ingo Wellenreuther

Personal details
- Born: 7 August 1995 (age 30) Karlsruhe, Germany
- Party: Alliance 90/The Greens
- Education: Karlsruhe Institute of Technology

Zoe Mayer (born 7 August 1995) is a German engineer and politician of Alliance 90/The Greens who has been a member of the Bundestag, the parliament of Germany, since the 2021 German federal election. She was directly elected as member of parliament for Karlsruhe-Stadt.

== Early life and education ==
Mayer graduated with a master's degree in Industrial Engineering and Management from Karlsruhe Institute of Technology in 2019 and has since been working on a PhD thesis about climate protection in the building sector. She completed her dissertation on 2 February 2023 during her time as a member of parliament.

== Political career ==
=== Career in local politics ===
Before being elected to the Bundestag, Mayer served as head of her party's group in Karlsruhe city council, where she was first elected in 2014.

=== Member of the German Parliament, 2021–present ===
In parliament, Mayer has been serving on the Committee on Food and Agriculture.

In addition to her committee assignments, Mayer has been one of the founding members of a cross-party group promoting a One Health approach since 2022.

In February 2026, two weeks before the 2026 Baden-Württemberg state election, Zoe Mayer posted an outtake from a 2018 interview with a regional TV station on TikTok and Instagram featuring Manuel Hagel, then CDU secretary general and now candidate for Minister-President in the upcoming election and accused him for sexualizing underage girls in it. The Greens candidate for the same election, Cem Özdemir defended Hagel and stated that Mayer did act on her own and not on behalf of the Green party.
