= Hipstamatic =

Digital photography mobile app

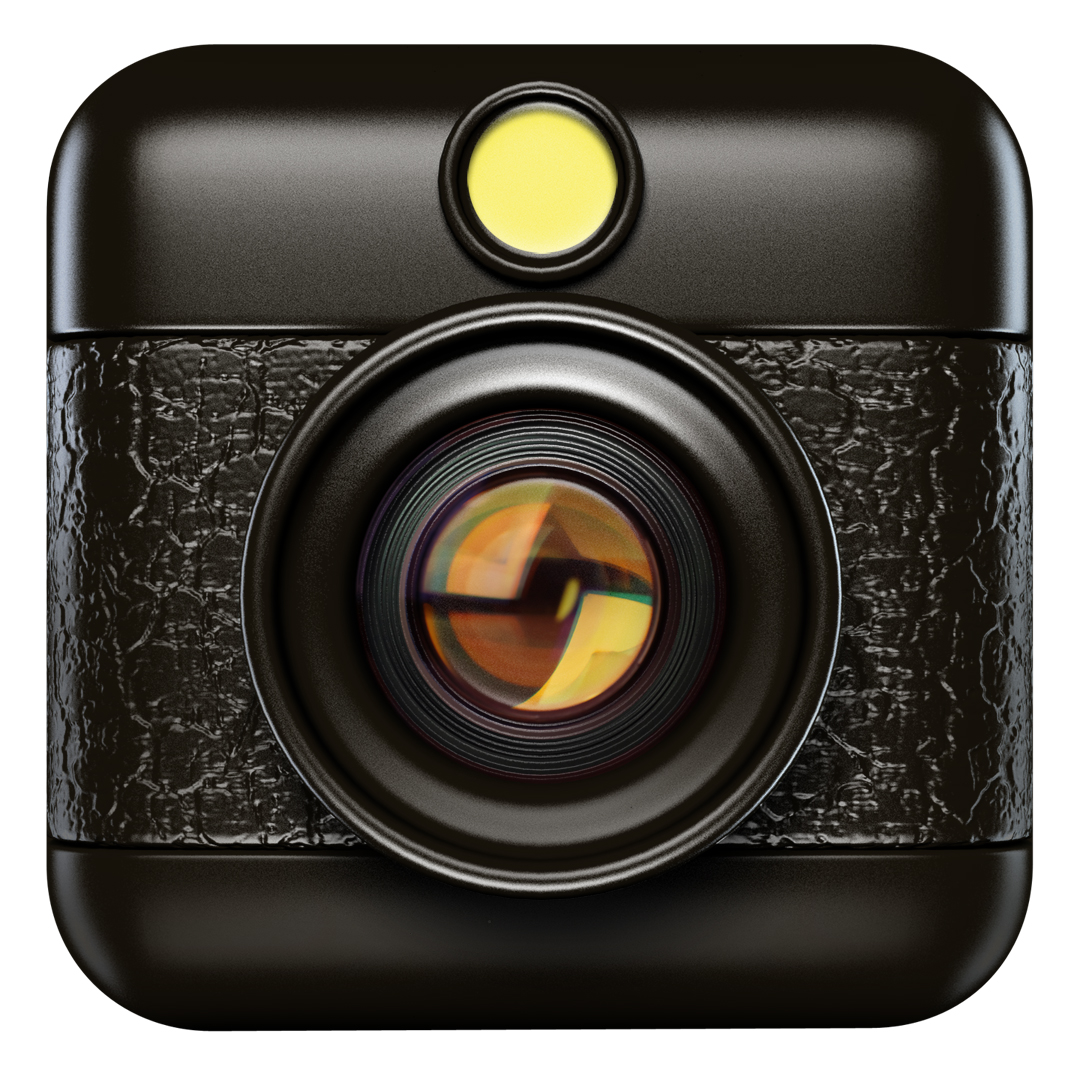
- App icon
- Original authors: Ryan Dorshorst, Lucas Buick
- Developer: Hipstamatic, LLC.
- Initial release: 2009; 16 years ago
- Operating system: iOS
- Size: 86.2 MB (iOS)
- License: Proprietary software with Terms of Use
- Website: hipstamatic.com

Hipstamatic is a digital photography application for iPhone sold by Hipstamatic, LLC. It uses the phone's camera to allow the user to shoot photographs, to which it applies a number of software filters to make the images look as though they were taken with a vintage film camera. The user can choose among a number of effects which are presented in the application as simulated lenses, films and flashes. Several of these are included with the application, while others may be acquired through an in-app purchase. The application had sold four million copies as of January 2012. A new version, Hipstamatic X, was launched in 2023.

== Background ==
According to Hipstamatic, the Hipstamatic 100 camera was developed in the early 1980s by Bruce and Winston Dorbowski, but was a commercial failure, selling fewer than 200 units. The application's styling is based on the style of a cheap plastic analog photographic camera. It is assumed that the backstory is viral advertising.

Hipstamatic is part of a retro trend in photography, which has seen a rise in the popularity of cheap and technically obsolete analog cameras (such as Lomography and Polaroid instant cameras), as well as software filters and smartphone software that emulate such cameras. Other vintage photography applications include CameraBag and Instagram. Like Hipstamatic, they often include social networking features. Some phones include similar built-in filters.

== Reception ==
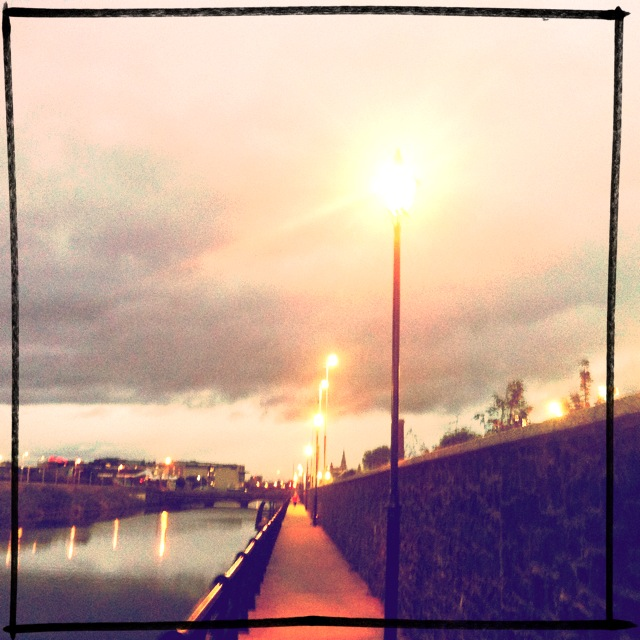
photo of Ringsend in Dublin taken with the Hipstamatic app using the "Lucas AB2 lens" feature.

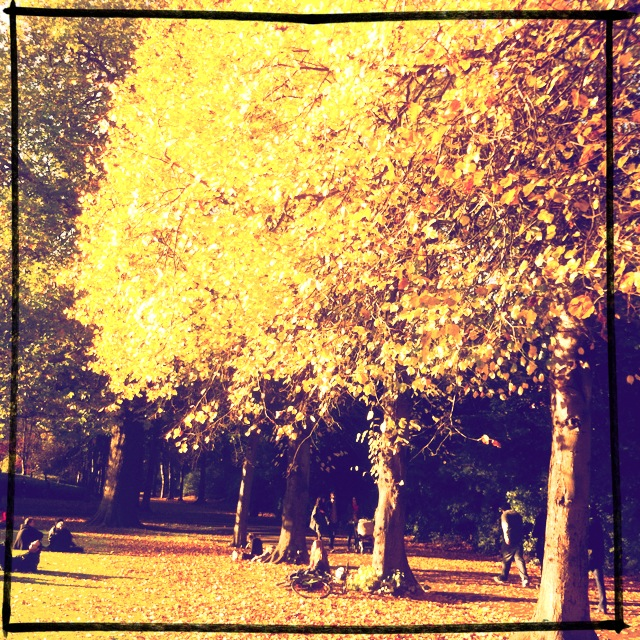
Photo of St. Stephen's Green, Dublin in autumn taken with Hipstamatic using the "RTV film" feature.

The application had sold 4 million times as of January 2012. It received additional publicity when The New York Times photographer Damon Winter used it in 2010 to illustrate a front-page story about the Afghanistan War. Winter's images gained recognition by receiving third place in the Pictures of the Year International photojournalism competition. In 2013, P&TLuxembourg issued a series of postage stamps featuring Hipstamatic photographs realized by François Besch.
