= Ingo Wellenreuther =

German politician

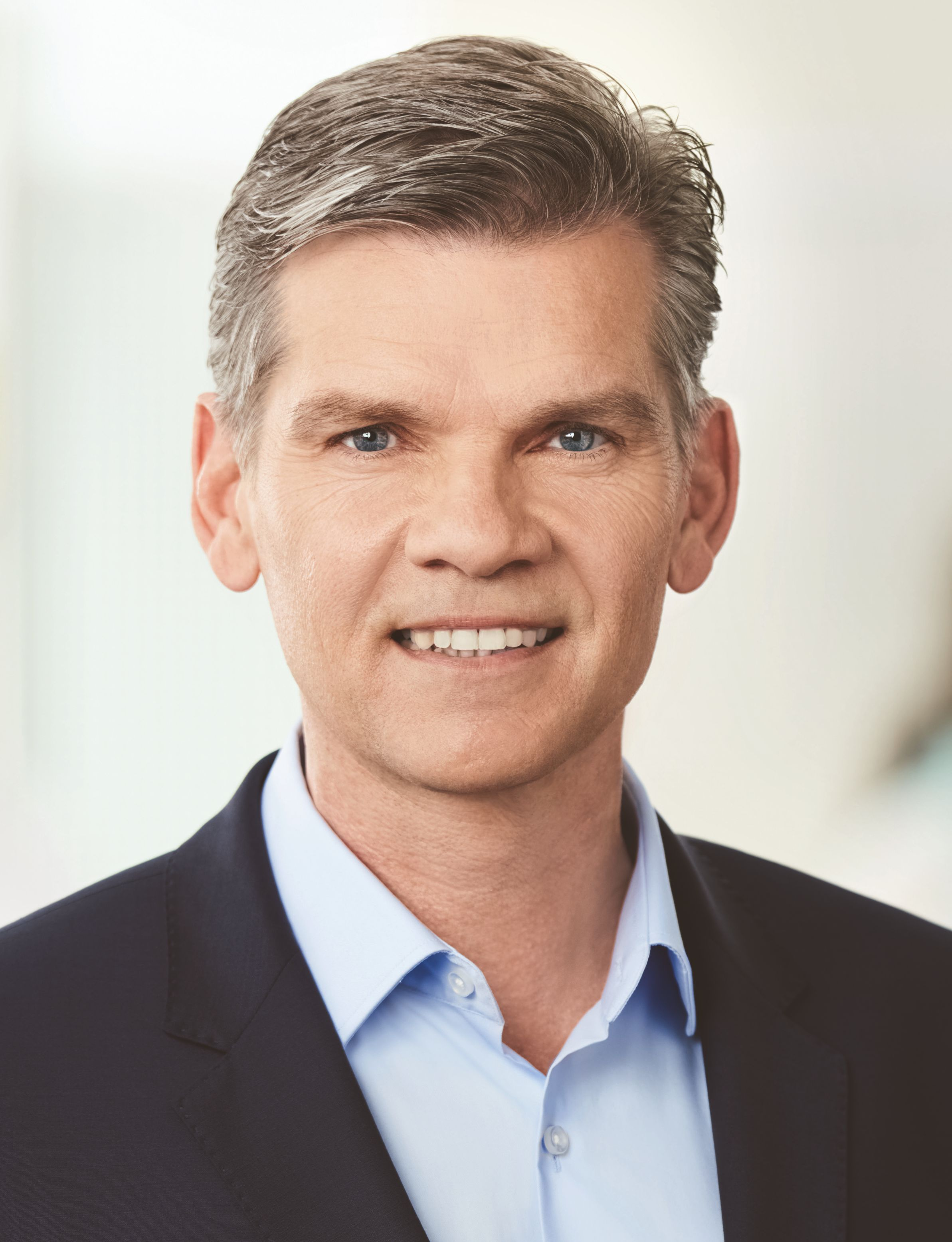
- Wellenreuther in 2017

Member of the Bundestag; from Baden-Württemberg
- In office 10 June 2024 – 25 March 2025
- Preceded by: Diana Stöcker
- Succeeded by: Vacant
- Constituency: Lörrach – Müllheim
- In office 17 October 2002 – 26 October 2021
- Preceded by: Multi-member district
- Succeeded by: Zoe Mayer
- Constituency: State list (2002–2005); Karlsruhe-Stadt (2005–2021)

Personal details
- Born: 16 December 1959 (age 66) Karlsruhe, West Germany
- Party: Christian Democratic Union
- Spouse: Anke
- Children: 2, including Timon
- Education: Heidelberg University; University of Giessen
- Profession: Lawyer
- Website: ingo-wellenreuther.de

Ingo Peter Wellenreuther (born 16 December 1959) is a German politician of the Christian Democratic Union (CDU) who served as a member of the Bundestag from 2002 to 2021.

== Early career ==
From 1991 until 2000, Wellenreuther was a judge at the Karlsruhe Regional Court. He later worked as advisor to the CDU/CSU parliamentary group in the German Parliament from 2000 until 2001.

== Political career ==
Wellenreuther first became a member of the German Bundestag in the 2002 federal elections.

From 2005 until 2009, Wellenreuther served on the Committee on Internal Affairs. From 2009, he was a member of the Committee on Legal Affairs and Consumer Protection. Also, from 2009, he served on the parliamentary body in charge of appointing judges to the Highest Courts of Justice, namely the Federal Court of Justice (BGH), the Federal Administrative Court (BVerwG), the Federal Fiscal Court (BFH), the Federal Labour Court (BAG), and the Federal Social Court (BSG).

Ahead of the Christian Democrats' leadership election in 2021, Wellenreuther publicly endorsed Friedrich Merz to succeed Annegret Kramp-Karrenbauer as the party's chair.

He lost his seat to Zoe Mayer of the Alliance 90/The Greens in the 2021 German federal election. In 2024, he moved into the Bundestag again as a replacement for Diana Stöcker via the CDU state list.

== Other activities ==
- Karlsruher SC, President (2010–2020)
- Federal Agency for Civic Education, Member of the Board of Trustees (since 2007)
- German Football Association (DFB), Member of the Board (2013–2017)
- Foundation Remembrance, Responsibility and Future, Member of the Board of Trustees (2006–2011)
- Internationaler Bund, Member of the Board of Trustees (2002–2017)

== Personal life ==
Wellenreuther is married. He is the father of Feyenoord's goalkeeper Timon Wellenreuther.
