= Gerold Benz =

German politician (1921–1987)

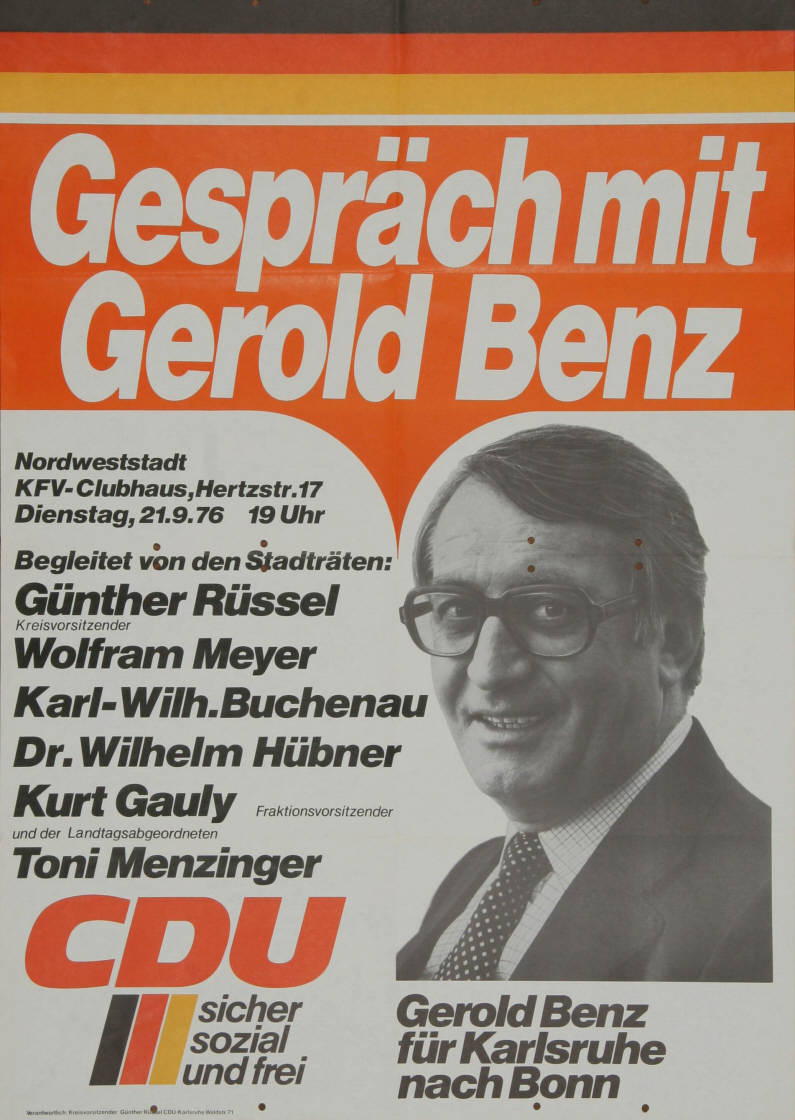
- Gerold Benz' announcement poster for the 1976 federal election

Member of the Bundestag; from Baden-Württemberg
- In office 13 December 1972 – 4 November 1980
- Preceded by: Multi-member district
- Succeeded by: Peter Corterier
- Constituency: State list (1972–1976); Karlsruhe (1976–1980)

Personal details
- Born: 2 May 1921 Offenburg, Germany
- Died: 23 July 1987 (aged 66) Karlsruhe, West Germany
- Party: Christian Democratic Union
- Education: University of Freiburg

Gerold Benz (2 May 1921 – 23 July 1987) was a German politician of the Christian Democratic Union (CDU) and former member of the German Bundestag.

== Life ==
In 1972 he was elected to the German Bundestag via the state list of the CDU in Baden-Württemberg. There he was a full member of the Committee for Research and Technology and for Post and Telecommunications. He was directly elected to the Bundestag in the 1976 federal election in constituency 178 (Karlsruhe). He was a full member of the Committee for Research and Technology from 1976 to 1980. He was also a deputy member of the Committee on Home Affairs in both legislative periods.

== Literature ==
Herbst, Ludolf; Jahn, Bruno (2002). Vierhaus, Rudolf (ed.). Biographisches Handbuch der Mitglieder des Deutschen Bundestages. 1949–2002 [Biographical Handbook of the Members of the German Bundestag. 1949–2002] (in German). München: De Gruyter - De Gruyter Saur. p. 1715. ISBN 978-3-11-184511-1.
