= Parsa Marvi =

German politician

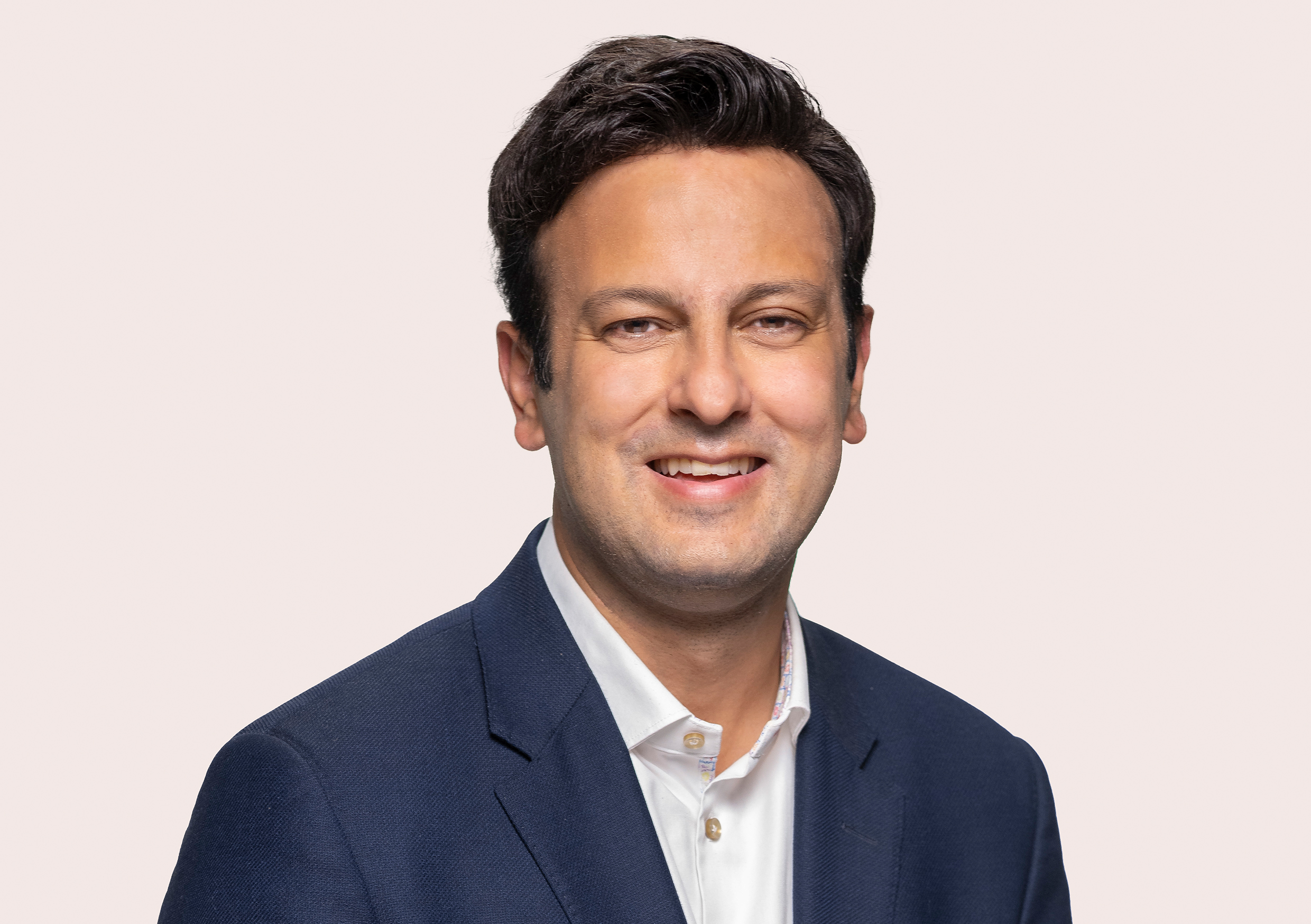

Member of the Bundestag for Baden-Württemberg
- Incumbent
- Assumed office 26 October 2021
- Constituency: The SPD list (2021; 2025)

Personal details
- Born: 6 February 1982 (age 44) Tehran, Iran
- Party: SPD

Parsa Marvi (born 6 February 1982) is a German politician of the Social Democratic Party (SPD) who has been serving as a member of the Bundestag since 2021.

== Early life and career ==
Marvi was born 1982 in the Iranian city of Tehran and became German cititzen in 2020.

Marvi worked at MLP (2006–2011) and 1&1 Telecommunication (2011–2021).

== Political career ==
Marvi became a member of the Bundestag in the 2021 elections, representing the Karlsruhe-Stadt district. In parliament, he has since been serving on the Finance Committee and the Committee on Digital Affairs. He was re-elected in 2025.

== Other activities ==
- Sparkasse Karlsruhe, Member of the Supervisory Board (–2021)
- German United Services Trade Union (ver.di), Member
