= François Besch =

Luxembourgish photographer and artist

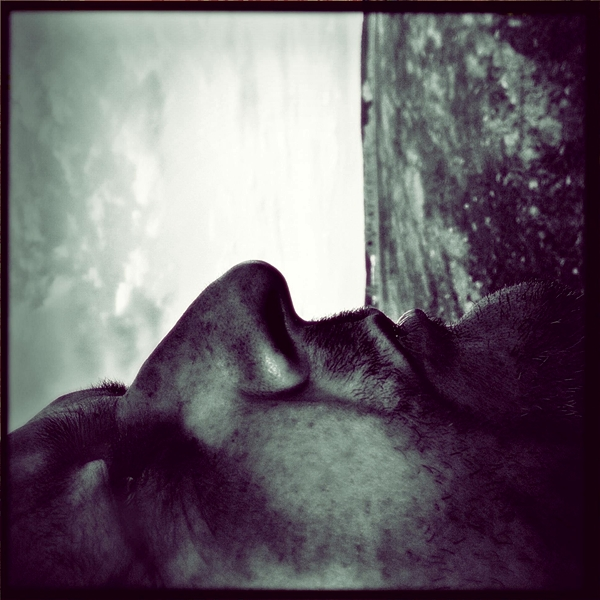
Hipstamatic self-portrait

François Besch (born 11 April 1963) is a Luxembourgish photographer and artist.

== Life and work ==
Besch was born on 11 April 1963 in Esch-sur-Alzette. The autodidact has been living and working in Bivange since 2006.

In Besch's nature and landscape shots, his primary interest is in conveying feelings or moods. he has also made portrait, street and experimental photography since the 1980s. He uses classic cameras and also a smartphone. In 2011, Besch hosted an exhibition in Luxembourg in which the photographs were created using the Hipstamatic application for the iPhone.

In 2013 POST Luxembourg acquired five of his works—portraits of wild mushrooms—which were used on a series of postage stamps.

Besch also makes portraits of personalities using a smartphone, among them other photographers John G. Morris, Lucien Clergue and David Hamilton.

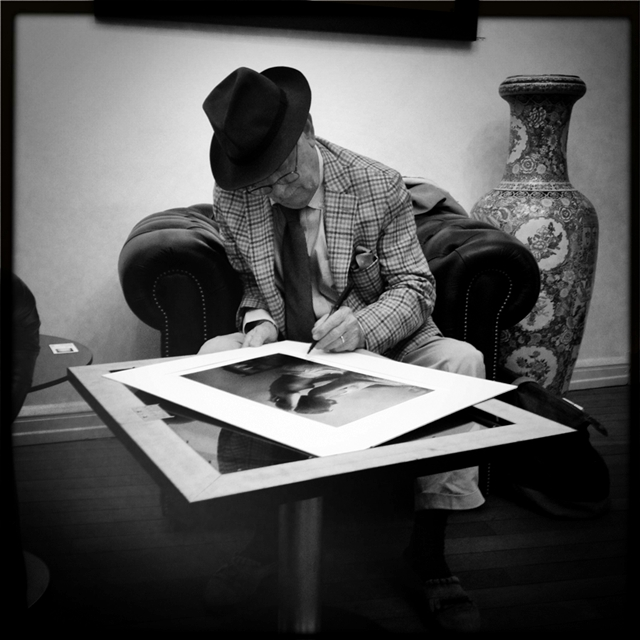
David Hamilton

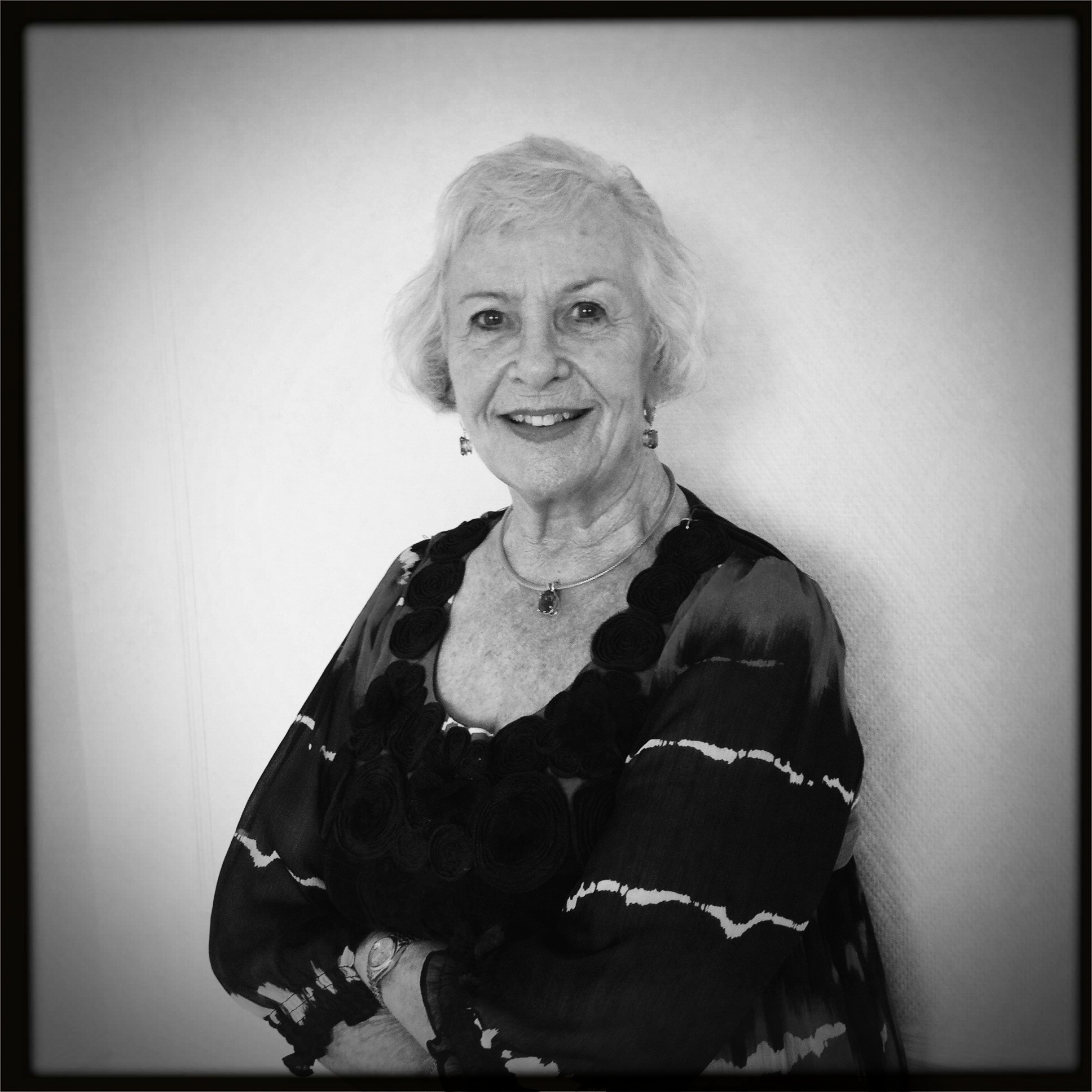
Germaine Damar

Philharmonie Luxembourg

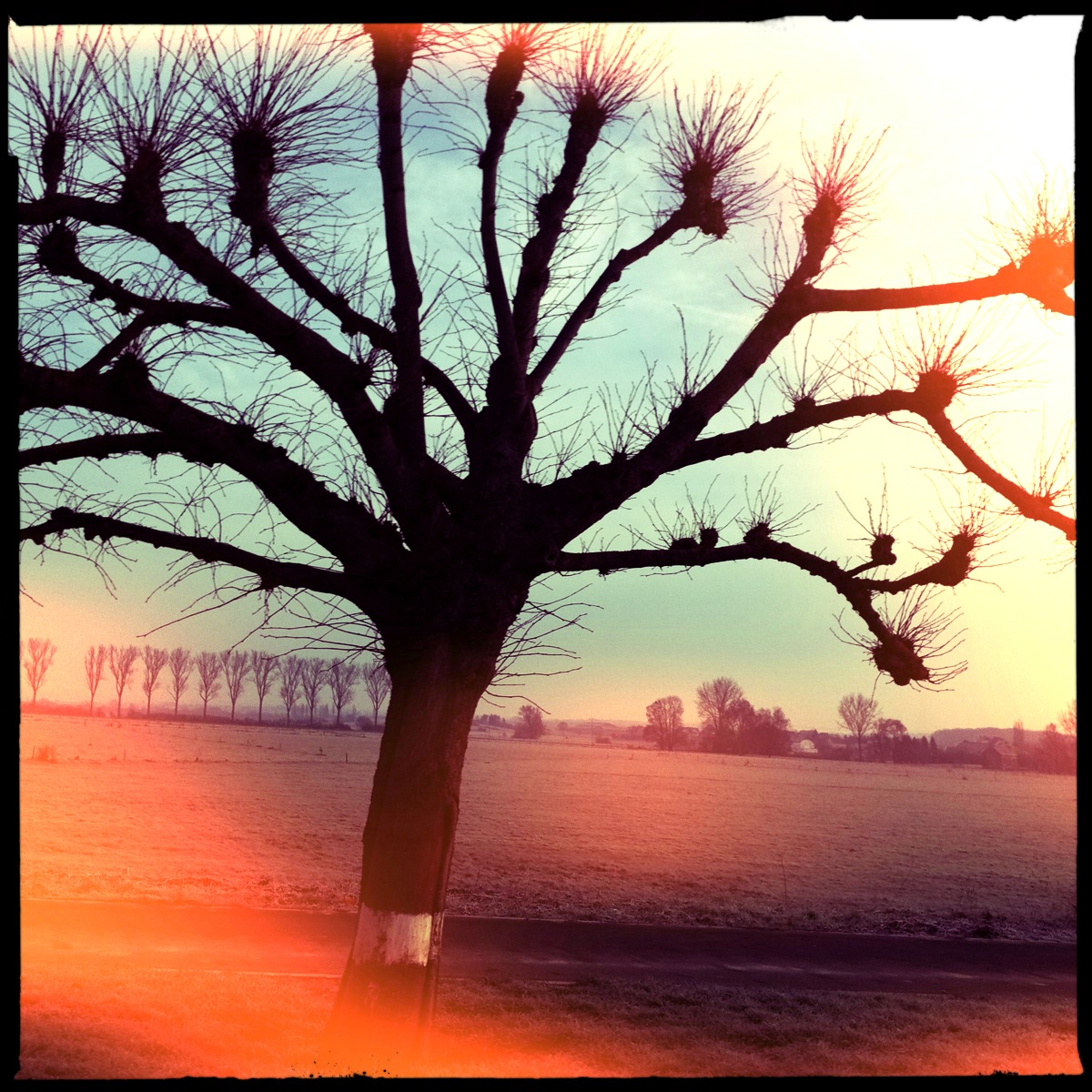
Joshua Tree

== Awards ==
- 2017: Monika von Boch-Preis für Fotografie

== Exhibitions ==
- 2013: Von Glückspilzen und anderen Lichtwelten, Galerie Clairefontaine (Espace 2), Luxemburg
- 2013: The Story of the Creative, See.Me Exhibition Space, New York City
- 2014: Salon d'automne du Cercle artistique de Luxembourg
- 2015: BeNeLux, Galerie bij de Boeken, Ulft, Netherlands
- 2015: Six Lives in Photography, Photomeetings Luxembourg
- 2016: Luxembourg Art Week 2016, Salon d'automne du Cercle artistique de Luxembourg
- 2017: François Besch, Hipstamatics, Museum Schloss Fellenberg, Merzig, Germany
