= Sylvia Kotting-Uhl =

German politician (born 1952)

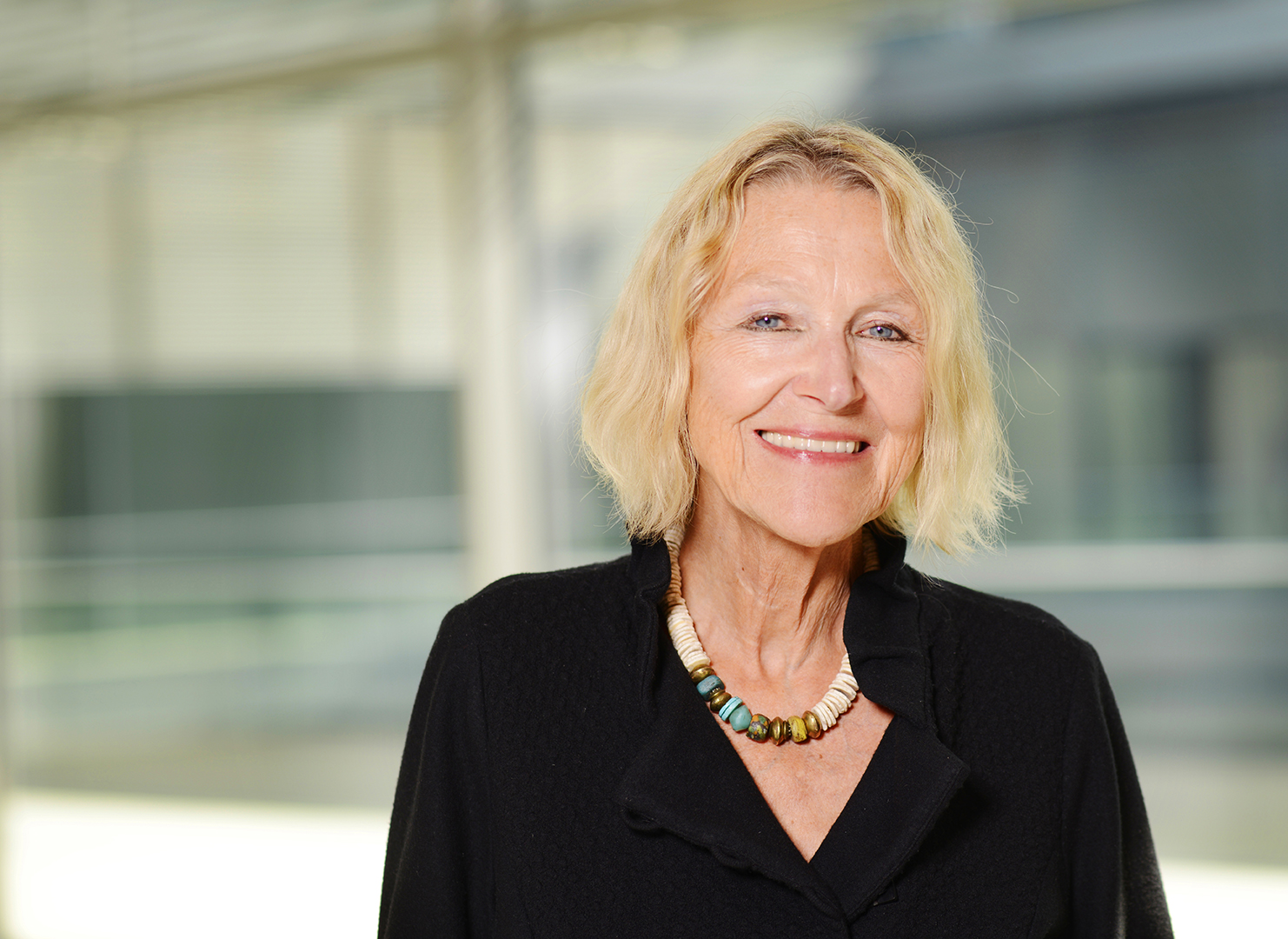
- Kotting-Uhl in 2019

Member of the Bundestag
- In office 2005–2021

Personal details
- Born: 29 December 1952 (age 73) Karlsruhe, West Germany (now Germany)
- Party: Greens
- Children: 3

Sylvia Kotting-Uhl (born 29 December 1952) is a German politician of Alliance 90/The Greens who served as a member of the Bundestag from the state of Baden-Württemberg from 2005 until 2021.

== Early life and career ==
Kotting-Uhl spent her childhood in northern Baden. After graduating from high school she studied German, English and art history in Heidelberg, Edinburgh and Zaragoza. Afterwards she worked as a dramaturg at the Baden State Theatre, but when she started her family she decided on an "alternative life in the Kraichgau with self-catering tendencies".

In a second professional life, from 1985 onwards, Kotting-Uhl built up a children's workshop, which she ran for more than ten years and to which a women's workshop is now also affiliated. She also worked as a lecturer for independent educational institutions and completed a distance learning course in psychology.

== Political career ==
From 2003 until 2005, Kotting-Uhl served as co-chair (alongside Andreas Braun) of the Green Party in Baden-Württemberg.

From the 2005 national elections, Kotting-Uhl was a member of the German Bundestag. She served as chairwoman of the Committee on Environment, Nature Conservation and Nuclear Safety. From 2005 until 2009, she was also a member of the Parliamentary Advisory Board on Sustainable Development.

In addition to her committee assignments, Kotting-Uhl was part of the German-Japanese Parliamentary Friendship Group, which she chaired from 2014 until 2018.

From 2014 to 2016, Kotting-Uhl was one of the members of the country's temporary National Commission on the Disposal of Radioactive Waste, chaired by Ursula Heinen-Esser and Michael Müller.

Following the 2016 state elections in Baden-Württemberg, Kotting-Uhl was part of the Winfried Kretschmann’s team in the negotiations between the Green Party and Christian Democratic Union (CDU) on a coalition agreement for Germany's first state government led by the Greens.

In 2017, Kotting-Uhl made news headlines when she successfully filed a complaint against the Government of the United Kingdom for a breach of the Aarhus Convention by failing to notify the German public of the potential environmental impacts of the Hinkley Point C nuclear power station.

In early 2020, Kotting-Uhl announced that she would not stand in the 2021 federal elections but instead resign from active politics by the end of the parliamentary term.

== Other activities ==
- German Federal Environmental Foundation (DBU), Member of the Board of Trustees (since 2018)
- Federal Company for Radioactive Waste Disposal (BGE), Member of the Supervisory Board (since 2017)
- German Federation for the Environment and Nature Conservation (BUND), Member
- Greenpeace, Member
- World Wide Fund for Nature (WWF), Member
