= Dietrich Bahner =

German politician (1939–2009)

Member of the Bundestag for Berlin
- In office 12 September 1979 – 29 March 1983
- Preceded by: Jürgen Wohlrabe
- Succeeded by: multi-member district
- Constituency: Christian Democratic Union List

Member of the Berlin House of Representatives for Wedding
- In office 24 April 1975 – 5 November 1979
- Preceded by: multi-member district
- Succeeded by: Peter Rauschenbach

Personal details
- Born: 8 June 1939 Berlin, Germany
- Died: 21 May 2009 (aged 69) Berlin, Germany
- Party: Independent
- Other political affiliations: Demokratische Alternative für Umweltschutz, Steuerzahler und Arbeitsplätze (1984–1989); Christian Democratic Union (1971–1983)
- Education: Free University of Berlin
- Occupation: Politician; Businessman

Dietrich Bahner (8 June 1939 – 21 May 2009) was a German politician of the Christian Democratic Union (CDU) and former member of the German Bundestag.

== Life ==
Bahner had been a member of the CDU since 1971, one year later he was chairman of the local association in Berlin-Wedding. In 1973 and 1974 he was deputy chairman of the Junge Union Berlin. He was both the district chairman of the CDU in Berlin-Wedding and a member of the federal board of the CDU's economic council. From 1975 to 1979, he was a member of the Berlin House of Representatives, where he resigned to replace Jürgen Wohlrabe in the Bundestag on 12 September 1979. In the 1980 federal elections, he was again sent to the Bundestag as a Berlin member of parliament. He was a member of the Committee on Petitions and the Committee on Labour and Social Affairs.

== Literature ==
Herbst, Ludolf; Jahn, Bruno (2002). Vierhaus, Rudolf (ed.). Biographisches Handbuch der Mitglieder des Deutschen Bundestages. 1949–2002 [Biographical Handbook of the Members of the German Bundestag. 1949–2002] (in German). München: De Gruyter - De Gruyter Saur. p. 1715. ISBN 978-3-11-184511-1.
