= Marc Bernhard =

German politician (born 1972)

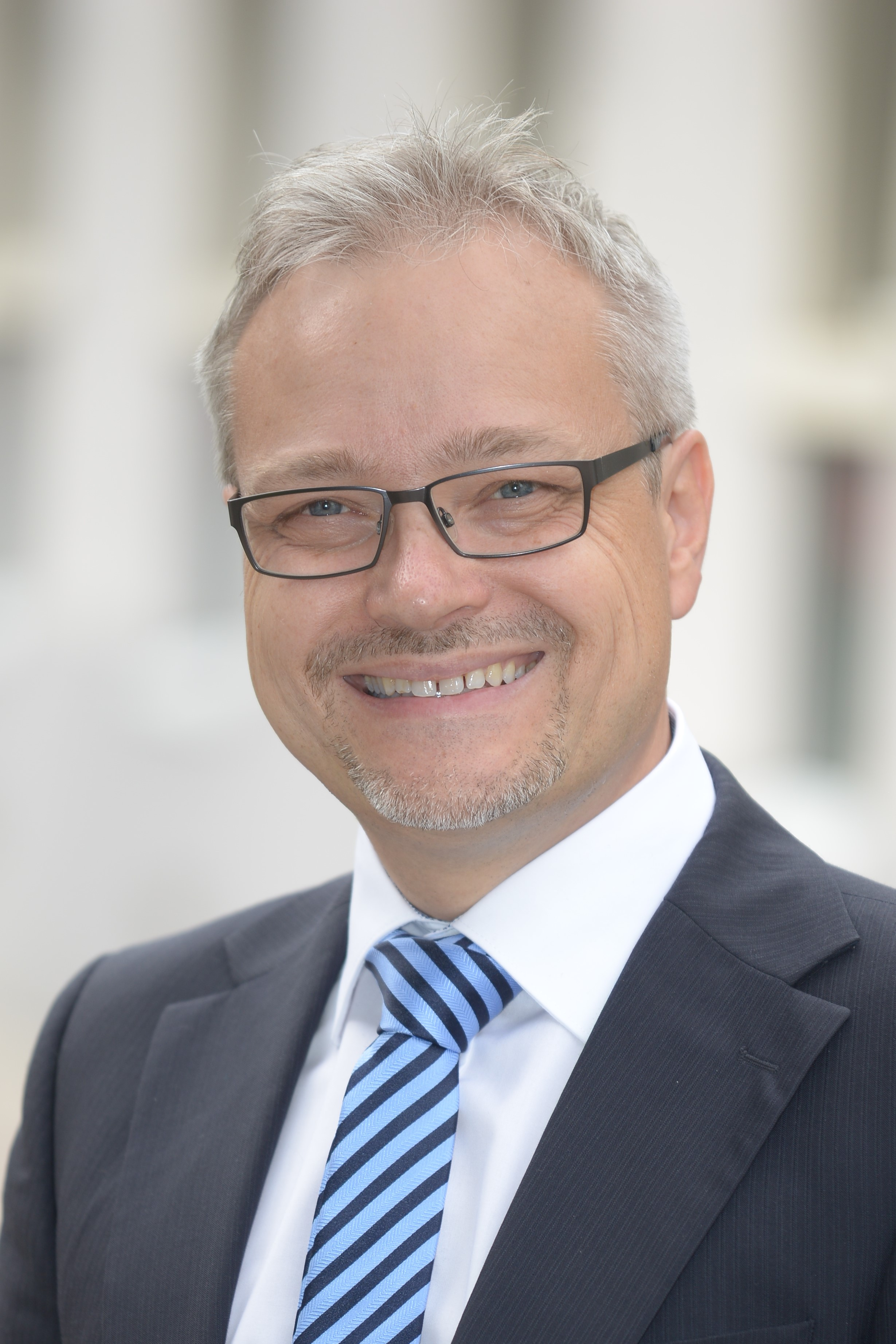
- Bernhard in 2017

Member of the Bundestag
- Incumbent
- Assumed office 24 October 2017

Personal details
- Born: 5 February 1972 (age 54)
- Party: Alternative for Germany

Marc Bernhard (born 5 February 1972) is a German politician for the Alternative for Germany (AfD), and since 2017 member of the Bundestag, the federal legislative body.

== Life and politics ==
Bernhard was born in 1972 in the west German town of Reutlingen and studied jurisprudence at the University of Augsburg and became a lawyer. He worked as CEO of an IT-company in Karlsruhe.

Bernhard was member of the centre-right Christian Democratic Union of Germany before he entered the then newly founded AfD in 2013.

Since 2017 he has been a member of the Bundestag.

Bernhard denies the scientific consensus on climate change.
