= Hans Friderichs =

German politician (1931–2025)

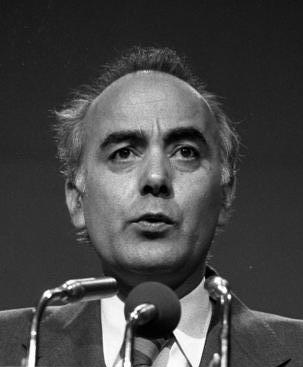
- Friderichs in 1975

Minister of Economy
- In office 15 December 1972 – 7 October 1977
- Chancellor: Willy Brandt; Helmut Schmidt
- Preceded by: Helmut Schmidt
- Succeeded by: Otto Graf Lambsdorff

Personal details
- Born: 16 October 1931 Wittlich, Rhine Province, Prussia, Germany
- Died: 16 November 2025 (aged 94) Mainz, Rhineland-Palatinate, Germany
- Party: Free Democratic Party

Hans Friderichs (16 October 1931 – 16 November 2025) was a German politician who served as the minister of economy from 1972 to 1977. He was also a jurist and businessman.

== Early life and education ==
Friderichs was born in Wittlich on 16 October 1931. He received a bachelor's degree in law and political science and also held a PhD.

== Career ==
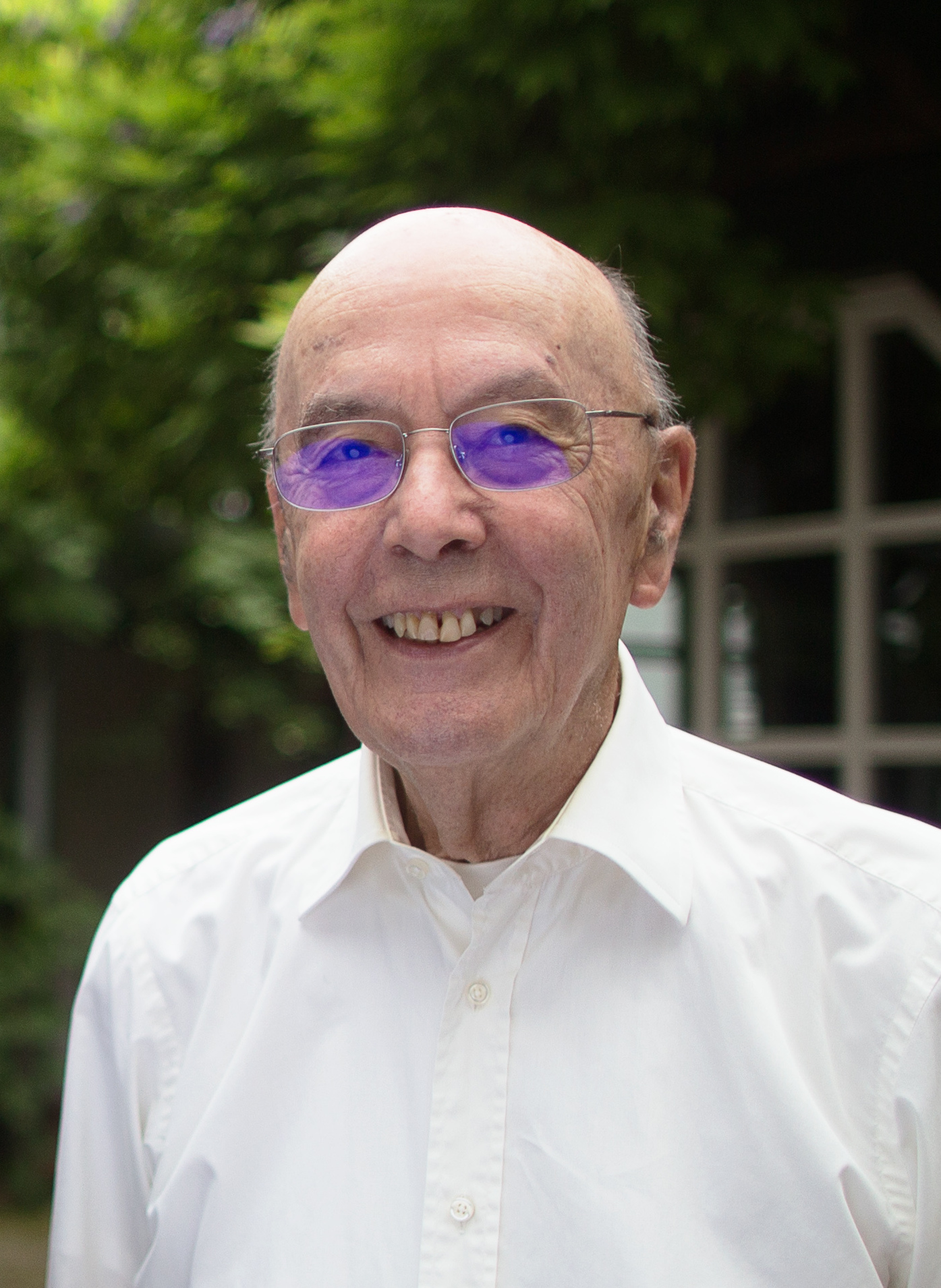
Friderichs in 2017

Friderichs was a member and leader of the Free Democrats. Until 1964 he was the deputy chairman of the party in North Rhine-Westphalia and then he became the chairman. He served as a member of the German Bundestag twice, from 1965 to 1969 and from 1972 to 1977. He was the minister of economy from 15 December 1972 to 7 October 1977. He first served in the cabinet led by Prime Minister Willy Brandt.

After leaving office, Friderichs worked in various capacities at different firms and institutions, including Adidas AG. In October 1977 he was named as the board member of the Dresdner Bank, replacing Jürgen Ponto who had been murdered. Until March 1985, he served as the head of the bank. He was the deputy chairman of the supervisory board of Adidas AG until 2007. On 7 November 2007, he was appointed chairman of the board and served in the post until 2009.

=== Controversy ===
In the course of criminal proceedings opened following the revelation of the notorious Flick affair, Friderichs, together with other eminent German politicians, was convicted for tax evasion and received a monetary penalty in 1985.

== Death ==
Friderichs died on 16 November 2025, at the age of 94.

== Rewards ==
- Decoration of Honour for Services to the Republic of Austria (1977)
- Order of Merit of the Federal Republic of Germany (1978)
- Order of Merit of Rhineland-Palatinate (2016)
