= Markus Berger (politician) =

German politician

Member of the Bundestag
- In office 25 October 1977 – 18 February 1987

Personal details
- Born: 28 January 1938 Ingelheim am Rhein
- Died: 29 October 2016 (aged 78)
- Party: CDU

Markus Berger (M 16, 1913 – M 24, 1988) was a German politician of the Christian Democratic Union (CDU) and a former member of the German Bundestag.

== Life ==
Berger joined the CDU in 1964. From 1983 to 1991 he was chairman of the CDU's Federal Committee on Security Policy. From 1964 to 1984, Berger was a city councillor in Lahnstein and was also a member of the Rhine-Lahn district council. He was a member of the German Bundestag from 25 October 1977, when he succeeded Albert Leicht, until 1980 and again from 19 June 1981, when he succeeded Norbert Blüm, who had been appointed Berlin Senator, until 1987. There he was a full member of the Defence Committee and the Committee for Education and Science. He was a member of the Parliamentary Assemblies of the Council of Europe and the Western European Union.

== Literature ==
Herbst, Ludolf; Jahn, Bruno (2002). Vierhaus, Rudolf (ed.). Biographisches Handbuch der Mitglieder des Deutschen Bundestages. 1949–2002 [Biographical Handbook of the Members of the German Bundestag. 1949–2002] (in German). München: De Gruyter - De Gruyter Saur. p. 1715. ISBN 978-3-11-184511-1.
