= Rudolf Blügel =

German politician (1927–1997)

Member of the Bundestag
- In office 20 July 1979 – 4 November 1980

Personal details
- Born: 5 March 1927 Neunkirchen (Saar)
- Died: 7 August 1997 (aged 70) Neunkirchen (Saar), Saarland, Germany
- Party: CDU

Rudolf Blügel (5 March 1927 – 7 August 1997) was a German politician of the Christian Democratic Union (CDU) and former member of the German Bundestag.

== Life ==
He joined the CDU in 1958. On 20 July 1979 he succeeded Werner Zeyer and was a member of the German Bundestag until the end of the 1980 legislative period. There he was a member of the Committee for Regional Planning, Building and Urban Development.

== Literature ==
Herbst, Ludolf; Jahn, Bruno (2002). Vierhaus, Rudolf (ed.). Biographisches Handbuch der Mitglieder des Deutschen Bundestages. 1949–2002 [Biographical Handbook of the Members of the German Bundestag. 1949–2002] (in German). München: De Gruyter - De Gruyter Saur. p. 1715. ISBN 978-3-11-184511-1.
