= Karin Binder =

German politician (born 1957)

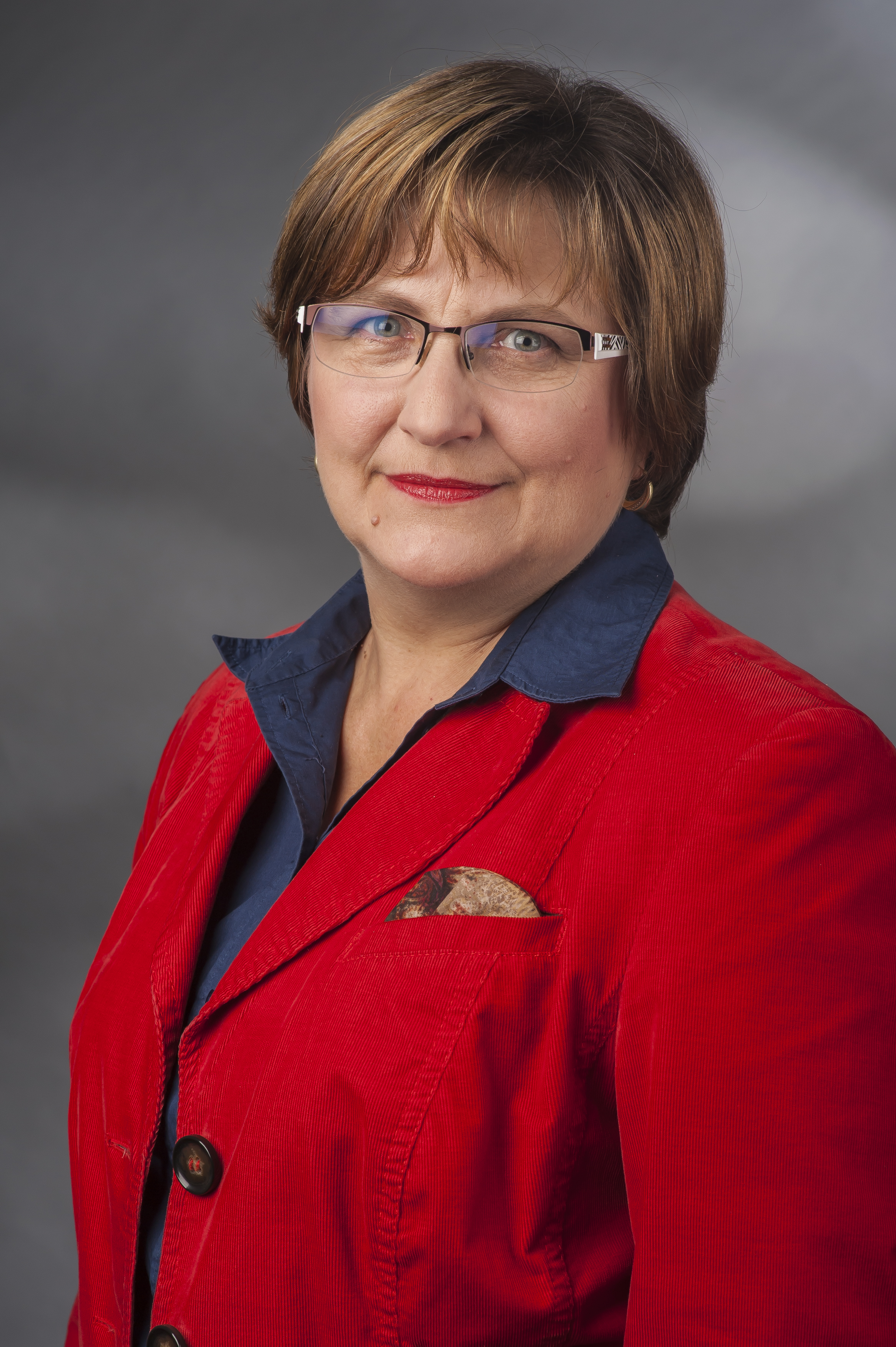
- Binder in 2014

Member of the Bundestag
- In office 2005–2017
- Constituency: Karlsruhe-Stadt

Personal details
- Born: 28 August 1957 (age 68) Stuttgart, West Germany
- Party: Die Linke.
- Website: karin-binder.de

Karin Binder (born 28 August 1957) is a German politician and member of Die Linke (The Left).

From 1975 to 1998 she was a member of the SPD. In 2005, she became a member of Die Linke, as well a member of the Bundestag from the same year. She was re-elected in 2009 and 2013, and did not seek re-election in 2017.
