= Peter Corterier =

German politician

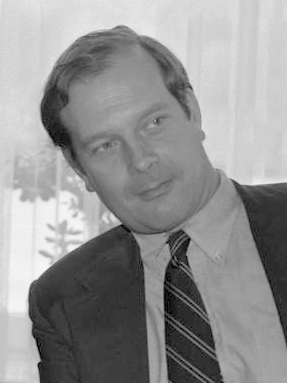
- Corterier in 1975

Member of the Bundestag; from Baden-Württemberg
- In office 13 June 1984 – 18 February 1987
- Preceded by: Rainer Offergeld
- Succeeded by: Multi-member district
- Constituency: State list
- In office 20 October 1969 – 29 March 1983
- Preceded by: Max Güde
- Succeeded by: Rudolf Ruf
- Constituency: Karlsruhe (1969–1976); State list (1976–1980); Karlsruhe-Stadt (1980–1983)

Personal details
- Born: 19 June 1936 Karlsruhe, Germany
- Died: 22 February 2017 (aged 80)
- Party: Social Democratic
- Education: University of Bonn

Peter Corterier (19 June 1936 – 22 February 2017) was a German politician of the Social Democratic Party (SPD) and former member of the German Bundestag.

== Life ==
From 1969 to 1983 Corterier was a member of the German Bundestag. On 13 June 1984, he succeeded Rainer Offergeld, who had left the Bundestag, as a substitute for him, and remained a member of the Bundestag until 1987. Peter Corterier entered the Bundestag in 1976 and 1984 via the Baden-Württemberg state list and otherwise always as a directly elected member of parliament for the Karlsruhe constituency.

From 1973 to 1977 Corterier was also a member of the European Parliament.

== Literature ==
Herbst, Ludolf; Jahn, Bruno (2002). Vierhaus, Rudolf (ed.). Biographisches Handbuch der Mitglieder des Deutschen Bundestages. 1949–2002 [Biographical Handbook of the Members of the German Bundestag. 1949–2002] (in German). München: De Gruyter – De Gruyter Saur. p. 1715. ISBN 978-3-11-184511-1.
