= Johann Christoph Besch =

German politician (1937–2011)

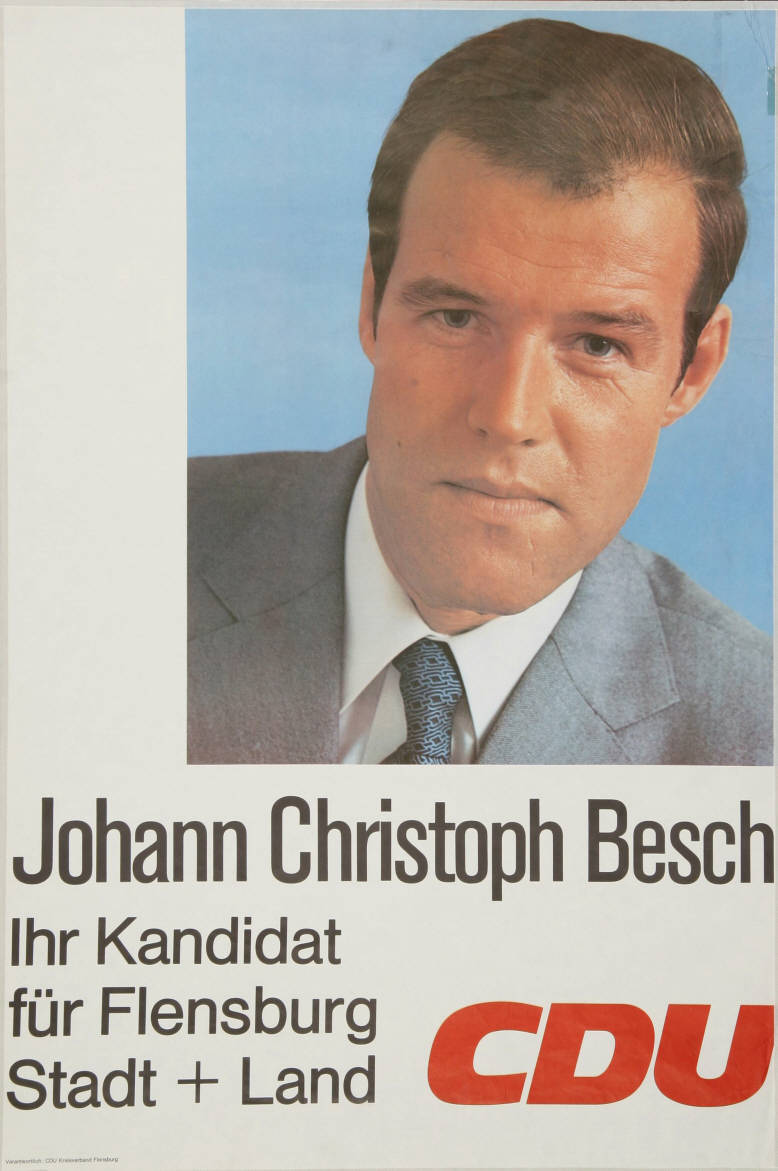
- Candidate poster Johann Christoph Beschs for the 1972 federal elections

Member of the Bundestag
- In office 3 July 1979 – 4 November 1980

Personal details
- Born: 20 March 1937 Hamburg
- Died: 27 February 2011 (aged 73)
- Party: CDU

Johann Christoph Besch (March 20, 1937 – February 27, 2011) was a German politician of the Christian Democratic Union (CDU) and former member of the German Bundestag.

== Life ==
Johann Christoph Besch was head of the scientific service of the Bundestag. He was a member of the Bundestag for the CDU as successor to Karl Carstens from 3 July 1979.

== Literature ==
Herbst, Ludolf; Jahn, Bruno (2002). Vierhaus, Rudolf (ed.). Biographisches Handbuch der Mitglieder des Deutschen Bundestages. 1949–2002 [Biographical Handbook of the Members of the German Bundestag. 1949–2002] (in German). München: De Gruyter - De Gruyter Saur. p. 1715. ISBN 978-3-11-184511-1.
