= List of members of the 7th Bundestag =

This is a list of members of the 7th Bundestag – the lower house of parliament of the Federal Republic of Germany, whose members were in office from 1972 until 1976.

== Summary ==
This summary includes changes in the numbers of the three caucuses (CDU/CSU, SPD, FDP):

Time	Reason of change	CDU/CSU	SPD	FDP	Others	Total number
1972	First meeting	230	225	41		496
8 December 1975	Hans-Uwe Emeis becomes a member but not of SPD caucus	230	224	41	1	496
8 December 1976	Karl-Heinz Stienen leaves the SPD caucus and becomes unaffiliated	230	223	41	2	496

== Members ==
State	No.	Constituency	Member	Party
Schleswig-Holstein	1	Flensburg	Walter Suck	SPD
Schleswig-Holstein	2	Schleswig – Eckernförde	Jürgen Anbuhl	SPD
Schleswig-Holstein	3	Nordfriesland – Dithmarschen-Nord	Willi-Peter Sick	CDU
Schleswig-Holstein	4	Steinburg – Dithmarschen-Süd	Kai-Uwe von Hassel	CDU
Schleswig-Holstein	5	Rendsburg – Neumünster	Elisabeth Orth (Note: Elisabeth Orth died on 10 May 1976.)	SPD
Schleswig-Holstein	6	Kiel	Norbert Gansel	SPD
Schleswig-Holstein	7	Plön	Lauritz Lauritzen	SPD
Schleswig-Holstein	8	Segeberg – Eutin	Klaus Konrad	SPD
Schleswig-Holstein	9	Pinneberg	Hermann P. Reiser	SPD
Schleswig-Holstein	10	Stormarn – Herzogtum Lauenburg	Friedrich Beermann (Note: Friedrich Beermann died on 24 November 1975.)	SPD
Schleswig-Holstein	11	Lübeck	Björn Engholm	SPD
Schleswig-Holstein	List		Rolf Bremer	CDU
Schleswig-Holstein	List		Karl Carstens	CDU
Schleswig-Holstein	List		Karl Eigen	CDU
Schleswig-Holstein	List		Heiner Möller	CDU
Schleswig-Holstein	List		Karl-Heinz Narjes	CDU
Schleswig-Holstein	List		Irma Tübler	CDU
Schleswig-Holstein	List		Olaf Baron von Wrangel	CDU
Schleswig-Holstein	List		Egon Bahr	SPD
Schleswig-Holstein	List		Detlef Haase	SPD
Schleswig-Holstein	List		Hans-Uwe Emeis (Note: Hans-Uwe Emeis took office on 8 December 1975, to succeed Friedrich Beermann.)	SPD
Schleswig-Holstein	List		Rudolf Herbers (Note: Rudolf Herbers took office on 12 May 1976, to succeed Elisabeth Orth.)	SPD
Schleswig-Holstein	List		Uwe Ronneburger (Note: Uwe Ronneburger resigned on 12 June 1975.)	FDP
Schleswig-Holstein	List		Werner Zywietz	FDP
Schleswig-Holstein	List		Walter Peters (Note: Walter Peters took office on 13 June 1975, to succeed Uwe Ronneburger.)	FDP
Hamburg	12	Hamburg-Mitte	Eugen Glombig	SPD
Hamburg	13	Altona	Karl Wilhelm Berkhan (Note: Karl Wilhelm Berkhan resigned on 19 March 1975.)	SPD
Hamburg	14	Eimsbüttel	Wilhelm Nölling (Note: Wilhelm Nölling resigned on 20 May 1974.)	SPD
Hamburg	15	Hamburg-Nord I	Hans Apel	SPD
Hamburg	16	Hamburg-Nord II	Rolf Meinecke	SPD
Hamburg	17	Wandsbek	Alfons Pawelczyk	SPD
Hamburg	18	Bergedorf	Helmut Schmidt	SPD
Hamburg	19	Harburg	Herbert Wehner	SPD
Hamburg	List		Erik Blumenfeld	CDU
Hamburg	List		Carl Damm	CDU
Hamburg	List		Heinrich Gewandt	CDU
Hamburg	List		Gerhard Orgaß	CDU
Hamburg	List		Dietrich Rollmann	CDU
Hamburg	List		Victor Kirst	FDP
Hamburg	List		Helga Schuchardt	FDP
Hamburg	List		Werner Staak (Note: Werner Staak resigned on 13 November 1974.)	SPD
Hamburg	List		Claus Arndt (Note: Claus Arndt took office on 20 May 1974, to succeed Wilhelm Nölling.)	SPD
Hamburg	List		Wiltrud Rehlen (Note: Wiltrud Rehlen took office on 14 November 1974, to succeed Werner Staak.)	SPD
Hamburg	List		Siegfried Röhlig (Note: Siegfried Röhlig took office on 19 March 1975, to succeed Karl Wilhelm Berkhan.)	SPD
Lower Saxony	20	Emden – Leer	Carl Ewen	SPD
Lower Saxony	21	Wilhelmshaven	Herbert Ehrenberg	SPD
Lower Saxony	22	Oldenburg	Walter Polkehn	SPD
Lower Saxony	23	Delmenhorst – Wesermarsch	Heinrich Müller	SPD
Lower Saxony	24	Cuxhaven	Hans Hermsdorf (Note: Hans Hermsdorf resigned on 30 May 1974.)	SPD
Lower Saxony	25	Stade	Nicolaus Dreyer	CDU
Lower Saxony	26	Emsland	Rudolf Seiters	CDU
Lower Saxony	27	Cloppenburg	Manfred Carstens	CDU
Lower Saxony	28	Hoya	Peter Würtz	SPD
Lower Saxony	29	Verden	Karl Ravens	SPD
Lower Saxony	30	Soltau – Harburg	Karl-Heinz Mursch	CDU
Lower Saxony	31	Lüneburg – Lüchow-Dannenberg	Horst Schröder	CDU
Lower Saxony	32	Bersenbrück	Burkhard Ritz	CDU
Lower Saxony	33	Osnabrück	Alfred Emmerlich	SPD
Lower Saxony	34	Nienburg	Richard Ey	CDU
Lower Saxony	35	Schaumburg	Friedel Schirmer	SPD
Lower Saxony	36	Hannover I	Egon Franke	SPD
Lower Saxony	37	Hannover II	Helmut Rohde	SPD
Lower Saxony	38	Hannover III	Werner Marquardt	SPD
Lower Saxony	39	Celle	Olaf Sund	SPD
Lower Saxony	40	Gifhorn	Hermann Barche	SPD
Lower Saxony	41	Hameln – Springe	Heinz Frehsee	SPD
Lower Saxony	42	Holzminden	Karl Ahrens	SPD
Lower Saxony	43	Hildesheim	Hermann Rappe	SPD
Lower Saxony	44	Salzgitter	Hans-Jürgen Junghans	SPD
Lower Saxony	45	Braunschweig	Hermann Oetting	SPD
Lower Saxony	46	Helmstedt – Wolfsburg	Rudolf Hauck	SPD
Lower Saxony	47	Goslar – Wolfenbüttel	Philip Rosenthal	SPD
Lower Saxony	48	Northeim	Martin Schmidt	SPD
Lower Saxony	49	Göttingen	Günter Wichert (Note: Günter Wichert resigned on 10 September 1974.)	SPD
Lower Saxony	List		Odal von Alten-Nordheim	CDU
Lower Saxony	List		Ursula Benedix	CDU
Lower Saxony	List		Philipp von Bismarck	CDU
Lower Saxony	List		Jan Eilers	CDU
Lower Saxony	List		Otto Freiherr von Fircks	CDU
Lower Saxony	List		Heinrich Franke	CDU
Lower Saxony	List		Herbert Gruhl	CDU
Lower Saxony	List		Karl-Heinz Hornhues	CDU
Lower Saxony	List		Hans Edgar Jahn	CDU
Lower Saxony	List		Hans Hugo Klein	CDU
Lower Saxony	List		Volkmar Köhler	CDU
Lower Saxony	List		Karl-Hans Lagershausen	CDU
Lower Saxony	List		Hanna Neumeister	CDU
Lower Saxony	List		Franz-Josef Nordlohne	CDU
Lower Saxony	List		Martin Oldenstädt	CDU
Lower Saxony	List		Eberhard Pohlmann	CDU
Lower Saxony	List		Helmut Sauer	CDU
Lower Saxony	List		Diedrich Schröder	CDU
Lower Saxony	List		Rudolf Sprung	CDU
Lower Saxony	List		Hans-Adolf de Terra	CDU
Lower Saxony	List		Lenelotte von Bothmer	SPD
Lower Saxony	List		Horst Gerlach	SPD
Lower Saxony	List		Hans Lemp	SPD
Lower Saxony	List		Helmuth Möhring	SPD
Lower Saxony	List		Paul Neumann	SPD
Lower Saxony	List		Olaf Schwencke	SPD
Lower Saxony	List		Willi Wolf	SPD
Lower Saxony	List		Wolfgang Schwenk (Note: Wolfgang Schwenk took office on 3 June 1974, to succeed Hans Hermsdorf.)	SPD
Lower Saxony	List		Günther Tietjen (Note: Günther Tietjen took office on 12 September 1974, to succeed Günter Wichert.)	SPD
Lower Saxony	List		Carlo Graaff (Note: Carlo Graaff died on 9 December 1975.)	FDP
Lower Saxony	List		Rötger Groß (Note: Rötger Groß resigned on 5 July 1974.)	FDP
Lower Saxony	List		Detlef Kleinert	FDP
Lower Saxony	List		Fritz Logemann	FDP
Lower Saxony	List		Friedrich Wendig	FDP
Lower Saxony	List		Torsten Wolfgramm (Note: Torsten Wolfgramm took office on 5 July 1974, to succeed Rötger Groß.)	FDP
Lower Saxony	List		Friedrich Kreibaum (Note: Friedrich Kreibaum took office on 15 December 1975, to succeed Carlo Graaff.)	FDP
Bremen	50	Bremen-Ost	Ernst Waltemathe	SPD
Bremen	51	Bremen-West	Claus Grobecker	SPD
Bremen	52	Bremerhaven – Bremen-Nord	Horst Grunenberg	SPD
Bremen	List		Ernst Müller-Hermann	CDU
North Rhine-Westphalia	53	Aachen-Stadt	Dieter Schinzel	SPD
North Rhine-Westphalia	54	Aachen-Land	Kurt Koblitz	SPD
North Rhine-Westphalia	55	Heinsberg	Adolf Spies von Büllesheim	CDU
North Rhine-Westphalia	56	Düren	Wolfgang Vogt	CDU
North Rhine-Westphalia	57	Bergheim (Erft)	Peter Milz	CDU
North Rhine-Westphalia	58	Köln-Land	Rudi Adams	SPD
North Rhine-Westphalia	59	Cologne I	Hans-Jürgen Wischnewski	SPD
North Rhine-Westphalia	60	Cologne II	Katharina Focke	SPD
North Rhine-Westphalia	61	Cologne III	Hubert Weber	SPD
North Rhine-Westphalia	62	Cologne IV	Erich Henke	SPD
North Rhine-Westphalia	63	Bonn	Alo Hauser	CDU
North Rhine-Westphalia	64	Rhein-Sieg-Kreis I	Georg Kliesing	CDU
North Rhine-Westphalia	65	Oberbergischer Kreis – Rhein-Sieg-Kreis II	Horst Waffenschmidt	CDU
North Rhine-Westphalia	66	Rheinisch-Bergischer Kreis	Bertram Blank	SPD
North Rhine-Westphalia	67	Leverkusen – Opladen	Bruno Wiefel	SPD
North Rhine-Westphalia	68	Remscheid	Kurt Wüster	SPD
North Rhine-Westphalia	69	Wuppertal I	Adolf Scheu	SPD
North Rhine-Westphalia	70	Wuppertal II	Willfried Penner	SPD
North Rhine-Westphalia	71	Solingen	Heinz Schreiber	SPD
North Rhine-Westphalia	72	Düsseldorf-Mettmann I	Heinz Pensky	SPD
North Rhine-Westphalia	73	Düsseldorf-Mettmann II	Uwe Holtz	SPD
North Rhine-Westphalia	74	Düsseldorf I	Gottfried Arnold	CDU
North Rhine-Westphalia	75	Düsseldorf II	Helmut Lenders	SPD
North Rhine-Westphalia	76	Düsseldorf III	Manfred Geßner	SPD
North Rhine-Westphalia	77	Neuss – Grevenbroich I	Josef Rommerskirchen	CDU
North Rhine-Westphalia	78	Rheydt – Grevenbroich II	Friedhelm Farthmann (Note: Friedhelm Farthmann resigned on 5 June 1975.)	SPD
North Rhine-Westphalia	79	Mönchengladbach	Curt Becker	CDU
North Rhine-Westphalia	80	Krefeld	Karl-Heinz Stienen	SPD
North Rhine-Westphalia	81	Kempen-Krefeld	Hugo Hammans	CDU
North Rhine-Westphalia	82	Moers	Jürgen Schmude	SPD
North Rhine-Westphalia	83	Kleve	Emil Solke	CDU
North Rhine-Westphalia	84	Dinslaken	Uwe Jens	SPD
North Rhine-Westphalia	85	Oberhausen	Erich Meinike	SPD
North Rhine-Westphalia	86	Mülheim	Willi Müller	SPD
North Rhine-Westphalia	87	Essen I	Erwin Lange	SPD
North Rhine-Westphalia	88	Essen II	Peter Reuschenbach	SPD
North Rhine-Westphalia	89	Essen III	Antje Huber	SPD
North Rhine-Westphalia	90	Duisburg I	Günter Schluckebier	SPD
North Rhine-Westphalia	91	Duisburg II	Hermann Spillecke	SPD
North Rhine-Westphalia	92	Ahaus – Bocholt	Hermann Josef Unland	CDU
North Rhine-Westphalia	93	Tecklenburg	Wilhelm Rawe	CDU
North Rhine-Westphalia	94	Beckum – Warendorf	Heinrich Windelen	CDU
North Rhine-Westphalia	95	Münster	Friedrich-Adolf Jahn	CDU
North Rhine-Westphalia	96	Steinfurt – Coesfeld	Gottfried Köster	CDU
North Rhine-Westphalia	97	Gelsenkirchen I	Josef Löbbert	SPD
North Rhine-Westphalia	98	Gelsenkirchen II	Hans Gertzen	SPD
North Rhine-Westphalia	99	Recklinghausen-Land	Günther Eckerland	SPD
North Rhine-Westphalia	100	Recklinghausen-Stadt	Erich Wolfram	SPD
North Rhine-Westphalia	101	Bottrop – Gladbeck	Johann Wuwer	SPD
North Rhine-Westphalia	102	Höxter	Leo Ernesti	CDU
North Rhine-Westphalia	103	Bielefeld-Land	Heinrich Junker	SPD
North Rhine-Westphalia	104	Bielefeld-Stadt	Elfriede Eilers	SPD
North Rhine-Westphalia	105	Detmold – Lippe	Erhard Mahne	SPD
North Rhine-Westphalia	106	Paderborn – Wiedenbrück	Rainer Barzel	CDU
North Rhine-Westphalia	107	Herford	Günter Biermann	SPD
North Rhine-Westphalia	108	Minden	Friedrich Schonhofen	SPD
North Rhine-Westphalia	109	Lüdinghausen	Udo Fiebig	SPD
North Rhine-Westphalia	110	Wanne-Eickel – Wattenscheid	Heinz Westphal	SPD
North Rhine-Westphalia	111	Herne – Castrop-Rauxel	Walter Arendt	SPD
North Rhine-Westphalia	112	Ennepe-Ruhr-Kreis	Hans-Jürgen Augstein	SPD
North Rhine-Westphalia	113	Hagen	Lothar Wrede	SPD
North Rhine-Westphalia	114	Dortmund I	Werner Zeitler	SPD
North Rhine-Westphalia	115	Dortmund II	Hans-Eberhard Urbaniak	SPD
North Rhine-Westphalia	116	Dortmund III	Walter Behrendt	SPD
North Rhine-Westphalia	117	Bochum	Karl Liedtke	SPD
North Rhine-Westphalia	118	Bochum – Witten	Herbert Baack	SPD
North Rhine-Westphalia	119	Iserlohn	Hermann Scheffler	SPD
North Rhine-Westphalia	120	Lippstadt – Brilon	Hermann Kroll-Schlüter	CDU
North Rhine-Westphalia	121	Olpe – Meschede	Otto Entrup	CDU
North Rhine-Westphalia	122	Arnsberg – Soest	Ferdinand Tillmann	CDU
North Rhine-Westphalia	123	Unna	Manfred Schulte	SPD
North Rhine-Westphalia	124	Lüdenscheid	Friedhelm Halfmeier	SPD
North Rhine-Westphalia	125	Siegen – Wittgenstein	Hermann Schmidt	SPD
North Rhine-Westphalia	List		Ulrich Berger	CDU
North Rhine-Westphalia	List		Karl Bewerunge	CDU
North Rhine-Westphalia	List		Kurt Birrenbach	CDU
North Rhine-Westphalia	List		Helmut von Bockelberg	CDU
North Rhine-Westphalia	List		Gerhard Braun	CDU
North Rhine-Westphalia	List		Ferdinand Breidbach	CDU
North Rhine-Westphalia	List		Fritz Burgbacher	CDU
North Rhine-Westphalia	List		Rembert van Delden	CDU
North Rhine-Westphalia	List		Göke Frerichs (Note: Göke Frerichs resigned on 15 January 1975.)	CDU
North Rhine-Westphalia	List		Hansheinz Hauser	CDU
North Rhine-Westphalia	List		Martin Horstmeier	CDU
North Rhine-Westphalia	List		Herbert Hupka	CDU
North Rhine-Westphalia	List		Agnes Hürland-Büning	CDU
North Rhine-Westphalia	List		Hans Katzer	CDU
North Rhine-Westphalia	List		Josef Klein	CDU
North Rhine-Westphalia	List		Herbert W. Köhler	CDU
North Rhine-Westphalia	List		Wilhelm Krampe	CDU
North Rhine-Westphalia	List		Konrad Kraske	CDU
North Rhine-Westphalia	List		Egon Lampersbach	CDU
North Rhine-Westphalia	List		Paul Löher	CDU
North Rhine-Westphalia	List		Manfred Luda	CDU
North Rhine-Westphalia	List		Josef Mick	CDU
North Rhine-Westphalia	List		Paul Mikat	CDU
North Rhine-Westphalia	List		Adolf Müller	CDU
North Rhine-Westphalia	List		Gerhard Reddemann	CDU
North Rhine-Westphalia	List		Gerd Ritgen	CDU
North Rhine-Westphalia	List		Hermann Josef Russe	CDU
North Rhine-Westphalia	List		Botho Prinz zu Sayn-Wittgenstein-Hohenstein	CDU
North Rhine-Westphalia	List		Hans Peter Schmitz	CDU
North Rhine-Westphalia	List		Hans Werner Schmöle	CDU
North Rhine-Westphalia	List		Gerhard Schröder	CDU
North Rhine-Westphalia	List		Christa Schroeder	CDU
North Rhine-Westphalia	List		Gerd Springorum	CDU
North Rhine-Westphalia	List		Maria Stommel	CDU
North Rhine-Westphalia	List		Max Vehar	CDU
North Rhine-Westphalia	List		Friedrich Vogel	CDU
North Rhine-Westphalia	List		Günter Volmer	CDU
North Rhine-Westphalia	List		Helga Wex	CDU
North Rhine-Westphalia	List		Erika Wolf	CDU
North Rhine-Westphalia	List		Otto Wulff	CDU
North Rhine-Westphalia	List		Manfred Schmidt (Note: Manfred Schmidt took office on 17 January 1975, to succeed Göke Frerichs.)	CDU
North Rhine-Westphalia	List		Helmuth Becker	SPD
North Rhine-Westphalia	List		Willy Brandt	SPD
North Rhine-Westphalia	List		Hermann Buschfort	SPD
North Rhine-Westphalia	List		Bernhard Bußmann	SPD
North Rhine-Westphalia	List		Helmut Esters	SPD
North Rhine-Westphalia	List		Karl-Heinz Hansen	SPD
North Rhine-Westphalia	List		Günter Jaschke	SPD
North Rhine-Westphalia	List		Horst Jaunich	SPD
North Rhine-Westphalia	List		Paul Kratz	SPD
North Rhine-Westphalia	List		Ulrich Lohmar	SPD
North Rhine-Westphalia	List		Wilderich Freiherr Ostman von der Leye	SPD
North Rhine-Westphalia	List		Annemarie Renger	SPD
North Rhine-Westphalia	List		Engelbert Sander	SPD
North Rhine-Westphalia	List		Karl-Heinz Saxowski	SPD
North Rhine-Westphalia	List		Hildegard Schimschok	SPD
North Rhine-Westphalia	List		Adolf Schmidt	SPD
North Rhine-Westphalia	List		Erwin Stahl	SPD
North Rhine-Westphalia	List		Albert Tönjes	SPD
North Rhine-Westphalia	List		Franz Vit	SPD
North Rhine-Westphalia	List		Kurt Vogelsang	SPD
North Rhine-Westphalia	List		Karl-Heinz Walkhoff	SPD
North Rhine-Westphalia	List		Martin Wendt	SPD
North Rhine-Westphalia	List		Karl Wienand (Note: Karl Wienand resigned on 3 December 1974.)	SPD
North Rhine-Westphalia	List		Waltraud Steinhauer (Note: Waltraud Steinhauer took office on 9 December 1974, to succeed Karl Wienand.)	SPD
North Rhine-Westphalia	List		Franz Müntefering (Note: Franz Müntefering took office on 10 June 1975, to succeed Friedhelm Farthmann.)	SPD
North Rhine-Westphalia	List		Ernst Achenbach	FDP
North Rhine-Westphalia	List		Rudolf Augstein (Note: Rudolf Augstein resigned on 24 January 1973.)	FDP
North Rhine-Westphalia	List		Gerhart Baum	FDP
North Rhine-Westphalia	List		Liselotte Funcke	FDP
North Rhine-Westphalia	List		Hans-Dietrich Genscher	FDP
North Rhine-Westphalia	List		Burkhard Hirsch (Note: Burkhard Hirsch resigned on 5 June 1975.)	FDP
North Rhine-Westphalia	List		Otto Graf Lambsdorff	FDP
North Rhine-Westphalia	List		Werner Maihofer	FDP
North Rhine-Westphalia	List		Alfred Ollesch	FDP
North Rhine-Westphalia	List		Rudolf Opitz	FDP
North Rhine-Westphalia	List		Walter Scheel (Note: Walter Scheel resigned on 27 June 1974.)	FDP
North Rhine-Westphalia	List		Rolf Böger (Note: Rolf Böger took office on 25 January 1973, to succeed Rudolf Augstein.)	FDP
North Rhine-Westphalia	List		Eckhard Schleifenbaum (Note: Eckhard Schleifenbaum took office on 5 June 1975, to succeed Burkhard Hirsch.)	FDP
North Rhine-Westphalia	List		Karl-Hans Laermann (Note: Karl-Hans Laermann took office on 28 June 1974, to succeed Walter Scheel.)	FDP
Hesse	126	Waldeck	Rudi Walther	SPD
Hesse	127	Kassel	Holger Börner (Note: Holger Börner resigned on 22 October 1976.)	SPD
Hesse	128	Eschwege	Egon Höhmann	SPD
Hesse	129	Fritzlar-Homberg	Heinz Kreutzmann	SPD
Hesse	130	Hersfeld	Wendelin Enders	SPD
Hesse	131	Marburg	Gerhard Jahn	SPD
Hesse	132	Wetzlar	Helmut Kater	SPD
Hesse	133	Gießen	Erwin Horn	SPD
Hesse	134	Fulda	Hermann Götz	CDU
Hesse	135	Obertaunuskreis	Dietrich Sperling	SPD
Hesse	136	Friedberg	Georg Schlaga	SPD
Hesse	137	Limburg	Benno Erhard	CDU
Hesse	138	Wiesbaden	Horst Krockert	SPD
Hesse	139	Hanau	Gerhard Flämig	SPD
Hesse	140	Frankfurt I	Georg Leber	SPD
Hesse	141	Frankfurt II	Fred Zander	SPD
Hesse	142	Frankfurt III	Hans Matthöfer	SPD
Hesse	143	Groß-Gerau	Hermann Schmitt-Vockenhausen	SPD
Hesse	144	Offenbach	Manfred Coppik	SPD
Hesse	145	Darmstadt	Günther Metzger	SPD
Hesse	146	Dieburg	Willi Bäuerle	SPD
Hesse	147	Bergstraße	Wolfgang Schwabe	SPD
Hesse	List		Wilfried Böhm	CDU
Hesse	List		Alfred Dregger	CDU
Hesse	List		Friedrich Freiwald (Note: Friedrich Freiwald died on 26 October 1974.)	CDU
Hesse	List		Lothar Haase	CDU
Hesse	List		Walther Leisler Kiep (Note: Walther Leisler Kiep resigned on 24 February 1976.)	CDU
Hesse	List		Knut von Kühlmann-Stumm	CDU
Hesse	List		Carl Otto Lenz	CDU
Hesse	List		Christian Lenzer	CDU
Hesse	List		Helmut Link	CDU
Hesse	List		Berthold Martin (Note: Berthold Martin died on 12 November 1973.)	CDU
Hesse	List		Erich Mende	CDU
Hesse	List		Gerhard O. Pfeffermann	CDU
Hesse	List		Walter Picard	CDU
Hesse	List		Walter Wallmann	CDU
Hesse	List		Hanna Walz	CDU
Hesse	List		Hans Wissebach	CDU
Hesse	List		Otto Zink	CDU
Hesse	List		Dieter Hussing (Note: Dieter Hussing took office on 16 November 1973, to succeed Berthold Martin.)	CDU
Hesse	List		Hermann Stahlberg (Note: Hermann Stahlberg took office on 1 November 1974, to succeed Friedrich Freiwald.)	CDU
Hesse	List		Erna-Maria Geier (Note: Erna-Maria Geier took office on 5 March 1976, to succeed Walther Leisler Kiep.)	CDU
Hesse	List		Karl-Hermann Flach (Note: Karl-Hermann Flach died on 25 August 1973.)	FDP
Hesse	List		Klaus-Jürgen Hoffie	FDP
Hesse	List		Wolfgang Mischnick	FDP
Hesse	List		Andreas von Schoeler	FDP
Hesse	List		Richard Wurbs	FDP
Hesse	List		Barbara Lüdemann (Note: Barbara Lüdemann took office on 4 September 1973, to succeed Karl-Hermann Flach.)	FDP
Hesse	List		Wolfgang Schmidt	SPD
Hesse	List		Helga Timm	SPD
Hesse	List		Günther Wuttke	SPD
Hesse	List		Karsten Voigt (Note: Karsten Voigt took office on 28 October 1976, to succeed Holger Börner.)	SPD
Rhineland-Palatinate	148	Neuwied	Peter Büchner	SPD
Rhineland-Palatinate	149	Ahrweiler	Johann Peter Josten	CDU
Rhineland-Palatinate	150	Koblenz	Egon Klepsch	CDU
Rhineland-Palatinate	151	Cochem	Klaus Bremm	CDU
Rhineland-Palatinate	152	Kreuznach	Conrad Ahlers	SPD
Rhineland-Palatinate	153	Bitburg	Alois Mertes	CDU
Rhineland-Palatinate	154	Trier	Carl-Ludwig Wagner (Note: Carl-Ludwig Wagner resigned on 8 April 1976.)	CDU
Rhineland-Palatinate	155	Montabaur	Willi Peiter	SPD
Rhineland-Palatinate	156	Mainz	Hugo Brandt	SPD
Rhineland-Palatinate	157	Worms	Willi Fischer	SPD
Rhineland-Palatinate	158	Frankenthal	Rudolf Kaffka	SPD
Rhineland-Palatinate	159	Ludwigshafen	Hans Bardens	SPD
Rhineland-Palatinate	160	Neustadt – Speyer	Peter Büchner	SPD
Rhineland-Palatinate	161	Kaiserslautern	Adolf Müller-Emmert	SPD
Rhineland-Palatinate	162	Pirmasens	Werner Marx	CDU
Rhineland-Palatinate	163	Landau	Albert Leicht	CDU
Rhineland-Palatinate	List		Norbert Blüm	CDU
Rhineland-Palatinate	List		Johannes Gerster	CDU
Rhineland-Palatinate	List		Georg Gölter	CDU
Rhineland-Palatinate	List		Elmar Pieroth	CDU
Rhineland-Palatinate	List		Jürgen Todenhöfer	CDU
Rhineland-Palatinate	List		Roswitha Verhülsdonk	CDU
Rhineland-Palatinate	List		Richard von Weizsäcker	CDU
Rhineland-Palatinate	List		Waltrud Will-Feld	CDU
Rhineland-Palatinate	List		Karl Martin Graß (Note: Karl Martin Graß took office on 13 April 1976, to succeed Carl-Ludwig Wagner.)	CDU
Rhineland-Palatinate	List		Werner Buchstaller	SPD
Rhineland-Palatinate	List		Hugo Collet	SPD
Rhineland-Palatinate	List		Klaus von Dohnanyi	SPD
Rhineland-Palatinate	List		Karl Haehser	SPD
Rhineland-Palatinate	List		Carl-Christoph Schweitzer	SPD
Rhineland-Palatinate	List		Kurt Jung	FDP
Rhineland-Palatinate	List		Lothar Krall	FDP
Baden-Württemberg	164	Stuttgart I	Peter Conradi	SPD
Baden-Württemberg	165	Stuttgart II	Ernst Haar	SPD
Baden-Württemberg	166	Stuttgart III	Horst Ehmke	SPD
Baden-Württemberg	167	Ludwigsburg	Gunter Huonker	SPD
Baden-Württemberg	168	Heilbronn	Erhard Eppler (Note: Erhard Eppler resigned on 3 June 1976.)	SPD
Baden-Württemberg	169	Leonberg – Vaihingen	Hans Geiger	SPD
Baden-Württemberg	170	Nürtingen – Böblingen	Anton Stark	CDU
Baden-Württemberg	171	Eßlingen	Volker Hauff	SPD
Baden-Württemberg	172	Göppingen	Manfred Wörner	CDU
Baden-Württemberg	173	Ulm	Herbert Werner	CDU
Baden-Württemberg	174	Aalen – Heidenheim	Manfred Abelein	CDU
Baden-Württemberg	175	Schwäbisch Gmünd – Backnang	Dieter Schulte	CDU
Baden-Württemberg	176	Crailsheim	Philipp Jenninger	CDU
Baden-Württemberg	177	Waiblingen	Manfred Wende	SPD
Baden-Württemberg	178	Karlsruhe	Peter Corterier	SPD
Baden-Württemberg	179	Mannheim I	Werner Nagel	SPD
Baden-Württemberg	180	Mannheim II	Hans Georg Schachtschabel	SPD
Baden-Württemberg	181	Heidelberg-Stadt	Alex Möller	SPD
Baden-Württemberg	182	Pforzheim – Karlsruhe-Land I	Lutz Stavenhagen	CDU
Baden-Württemberg	183	Bruchsal – Karlsruhe-Land II	Helmut Artzinger	CDU
Baden-Württemberg	184	Heidelberg-Land – Sinsheim	Fritz Baier	CDU
Baden-Württemberg	185	Tauberbischofsheim	Karl Miltner	CDU
Baden-Württemberg	186	Konstanz	Hermann Biechele	CDU
Baden-Württemberg	187	Donaueschingen	Hansjörg Häfele	CDU
Baden-Württemberg	188	Waldshut	Kurt Georg Kiesinger	CDU
Baden-Württemberg	189	Lörrach – Müllheim	Heinz Eyrich	CDU
Baden-Württemberg	190	Freiburg	Hans Evers	CDU
Baden-Württemberg	191	Emmendingen – Wolfach	Albert Burger	CDU
Baden-Württemberg	192	Offenburg	Wolfgang Schäuble	CDU
Baden-Württemberg	193	Rastatt	Hugo Hauser	CDU
Baden-Württemberg	194	Reutlingen	Anton Pfeifer	CDU
Baden-Württemberg	195	Calw	Helmut Prassler (Note: Helmut Prassler resigned on 3 November 1975.)	CDU
Baden-Württemberg	196	Rottweil	Bruno Heck	CDU
Baden-Württemberg	197	Balingen	Hermann Schwörer	CDU
Baden-Württemberg	198	Biberach	Eugen Maucher	CDU
Baden-Württemberg	199	Ravensburg	Claus Jäger	CDU
Baden-Württemberg	List		Rolf Böhme	SPD
Baden-Württemberg	List		Andreas von Bülow	SPD
Baden-Württemberg	List		Herta Däubler-Gmelin	SPD
Baden-Württemberg	List		Hermann Dürr	SPD
Baden-Württemberg	List		Fritz-Joachim Gnädinger	SPD
Baden-Württemberg	List		Frank Haenschke	SPD
Baden-Württemberg	List		Karl-Hans Kern	SPD
Baden-Württemberg	List		Renate Lepsius	SPD
Baden-Württemberg	List		Hedwig Meermann	SPD
Baden-Württemberg	List		Rainer Offergeld	SPD
Baden-Württemberg	List		Heinz Rapp	SPD
Baden-Württemberg	List		Klaus Richter	SPD
Baden-Württemberg	List		Friedrich Schäfer	SPD
Baden-Württemberg	List		Harald B. Schäfer	SPD
Baden-Württemberg	List		Horst Seefeld	SPD
Baden-Württemberg	List		Hansmartin Simpfendörfer	SPD
Baden-Württemberg	List		Dietrich Elchlepp (Note: Dietrich Elchlepp took office on 4 June 1976, to succeed Erhard Eppler.)	SPD
Baden-Württemberg	List		Siegbert Alber	CDU
Baden-Württemberg	List		Gerold Benz	CDU
Baden-Württemberg	List		Herbert Czaja	CDU
Baden-Württemberg	List		Ludwig Erhard	CDU
Baden-Württemberg	List		Isidor Früh	CDU
Baden-Württemberg	List		Kurt Härzschel (Note: Kurt Härzschel resigned on 23 September 1976.)	CDU
Baden-Württemberg	List		Paula Riede	CDU
Baden-Württemberg	List		Franz Sauter	CDU
Baden-Württemberg	List		Egon Susset	CDU
Baden-Württemberg	List		Kurt Wawrzik	CDU
Baden-Württemberg	List		Karl Weber	CDU
Baden-Württemberg	List		Gerhard Zeitel	CDU
Baden-Württemberg	List		Martin Schetter (Note: Martin Schetter took office on 3 November 1975, to succeed Helmut Prassler.)	CDU
Baden-Württemberg	List		Ingeborg Häckel (Note: Ingeborg Häckel took office on 28 September 1976, to succeed Kurt Härzschel.)	CDU
Baden-Württemberg	List		Martin Bangemann	FDP
Baden-Württemberg	List		Georg Gallus	FDP
Baden-Württemberg	List		Martin Grüner	FDP
Baden-Württemberg	List		Friedrich Hölscher	FDP
Baden-Württemberg	List		Werner Mertes	FDP
Baden-Württemberg	List		Karl Moersch	FDP
Baden-Württemberg	List		Kurt Spitzmüller	FDP
Baden-Württemberg	List		Manfred Vohrer	FDP
Bavaria	200	Altötting	Karl-Heinz Spilker	CSU
Bavaria	201	Fürstenfeldbruck	Richard Jaeger	CSU
Bavaria	202	Ingolstadt	Karl Heinz Gierenstein	CSU
Bavaria	203	Miesbach	Franz-Ludwig Schenk Graf von Stauffenberg	CSU
Bavaria	204	Munich Centre	Manfred Schmidt	SPD
Bavaria	205	Munich North	Wenzel Bredl	SPD
Bavaria	206	Munich East	Jürgen Vahlberg	SPD
Bavaria	207	Munich South	Rudolf Schöfberger	SPD
Bavaria	208	Munich West	Manfred Marschall	SPD
Bavaria	209	Munich Land	Albert Probst	CSU
Bavaria	210	Rosenheim	Ludwig Franz	CSU
Bavaria	211	Traunstein	Matthias Engelsberger	CSU
Bavaria	212	Weilheim	Franz Josef Strauss	CSU
Bavaria	213	Deggendorf	Franz Handlos	CSU
Bavaria	214	Landshut	Friedrich Zimmermann	CSU
Bavaria	215	Passau	Karl Fuchs	CSU
Bavaria	216	Straubing	Alois Rainer	CSU
Bavaria	217	Pfarrkirchen	Friedrich Kempfler	CSU
Bavaria	218	Amberg – Neumarkt	Heinrich Aigner	CSU
Bavaria	219	Burglengenfeld	Dionys Jobst	CSU
Bavaria	220	Regensburg	Hermann Höcherl	CSU
Bavaria	221	Tirschenreuth	Max Kunz	CSU
Bavaria	222	Bamberg	Paul Röhner	CSU
Bavaria	223	Bayreuth	Richard Müller	SPD
Bavaria	224	Coburg	Karl Hofmann	SPD
Bavaria	225	Hof	Hans Büchler	SPD
Bavaria	226	Kulmbach	Lorenz Niegel	CSU
Bavaria	227	Ansbach	Carl-Dieter Spranger	CSU
Bavaria	228	Erlangen	Dieter Haack	SPD
Bavaria	229	Fürth	Horst Haase	SPD
Bavaria	230	Nuremberg North	Hans Batz	SPD
Bavaria	231	Nuremberg South	Egon Lutz	SPD
Bavaria	232	Weißenburg	Richard Stücklen	CSU
Bavaria	233	Aschaffenburg	Paul Gerlach	CSU
Bavaria	234	Bad Kissingen	Alex Hösl	CSU
Bavaria	235	Karlstadt	Alfred Biehle	CSU
Bavaria	236	Schweinfurt	Max Schulze-Vorberg	CSU
Bavaria	237	Würzburg	Linus Memmel	CSU
Bavaria	238	Augsburg	Max Amling	SPD
Bavaria	239	Augsburg-Land	Walter Althammer	CSU
Bavaria	240	Donauwörth	Karl Heinz Lemmrich	CSU
Bavaria	241	Neu-Ulm	Leo Wagner	CSU
Bavaria	242	Kaufbeuren	Hans August Lücker	CSU
Bavaria	243	Kempten	Ignaz Kiechle	CSU
Bavaria	List		Alfons Bayerl	SPD
Bavaria	List		Ludwig Fellermaier	SPD
Bavaria	List		Bruno Friedrich	SPD
Bavaria	List		Friedrich Gerstl	SPD
Bavaria	List		Peter Glotz	SPD
Bavaria	List		Karl Herold	SPD
Bavaria	List		Georg Kahn-Ackermann (Note: Georg Kahn-Ackermann resigned on 18 September 1974.)	SPD
Bavaria	List		Uwe Lambinus	SPD
Bavaria	List		Dieter Lattmann	SPD
Bavaria	List		Hans Lautenschlager	SPD
Bavaria	List		Anke Martiny-Glotz	SPD
Bavaria	List		Rudolf Müller	SPD
Bavaria	List		Konrad Porzner	SPD
Bavaria	List		Philipp Seibert	SPD
Bavaria	List		Paul Heinrich Simon	SPD
Bavaria	List		Hans-Jochen Vogel	SPD
Bavaria	List		Axel Wernitz	SPD
Bavaria	List		Hans de With	SPD
Bavaria	List		Otto Wittmann	SPD
Bavaria	List		Franz Josef Zebisch	SPD
Bavaria	List		Manfred Wimmer (Note: Manfred Wimmer took office on 18 September 1974, to succeed Georg Kahn-Ackermann.)	SPD
Bavaria	List		Walter Becher	CSU
Bavaria	List		Werner Dollinger	CSU
Bavaria	List		Franz Xaver Geisenhofer	CSU
Bavaria	List		Reinhold Kreile	CSU
Bavaria	List		Günther Müller	CSU
Bavaria	List		Erich Riedl	CSU
Bavaria	List		Hans Roser	CSU
Bavaria	List		Albert Schedl	CSU
Bavaria	List		Ursula Schleicher	CSU
Bavaria	List		Peter Schmidhuber	CSU
Bavaria	List		Oscar Schneider	CSU
Bavaria	List		Heinz Starke	CSU
Bavaria	List		Theo Waigel	CSU
Bavaria	List		Jürgen Warnke	CSU
Bavaria	List		Fritz Wittmann	CSU
Bavaria	List		Erich Ziegler	CSU
Bavaria	List		Siegfried Zoglmann	CSU
Bavaria	List		Herbert Christ	FDP
Bavaria	List		Hans A. Engelhard	FDP
Bavaria	List		Josef Ertl	FDP
Bavaria	List		Karl Geldner	FDP
Bavaria	List		Hansheinrich Schmidt	FDP
Saarland	244	Saarbrücken-Stadt	Günter Slotta (Note: Günter Slotta died on 9 June 1974.)	SPD
Saarland	245	Saarbrücken-Land	Alwin Brück	SPD
Saarland	246	Saarlouis	Josef Schmitt	CDU
Saarland	247	Ottweiler	Werner Zeyer	CDU
Saarland	248	St. Ingbert	Werner Wilhelm	SPD
Saarland	List		Werner Ferrang (Note: Werner Ferrang died on 31 May 1974.)	CDU
Saarland	List		Kurt Thürk	CDU
Saarland	List		Doris Pack (Note: Doris Pack took office on 1 June 1974, to succeed Werner Ferrang.)	CDU
Saarland	List		Alwin Kulawig	SPD
Saarland	List		Helwin Peter (Note: Helwin Peter took office on 10 June 1974, to succeed Günter Slotta.)	SPD
West Berlin			Klaus Dieter Arndt (Note: Klaus Dieter Arndt died on 29 January 1974.)	SPD
West Berlin			Reinhard Bühling	SPD
West Berlin			Ulrich Dübber	SPD
West Berlin			Jürgen Egert	SPD
West Berlin			Roelf Heyen (Note: Roelf Heyen died on 5 June 1975.)	SPD
West Berlin			Lothar Löffler	SPD
West Berlin			Kurt Mattick	SPD
West Berlin			Ernst Schellenberg	SPD
West Berlin			Marie Schlei	SPD
West Berlin			Rolf Schwedler	SPD
West Berlin			Hellmut Sieglerschmidt	SPD
West Berlin			Gottfried Wurche (Note: Gottfried Wurche resigned on 3 June 1975.)	SPD
West Berlin			Angela Grützmann (Note: Angela Grützmann took office on 2 February 1974, to succeed Klaus Dieter Arndt.)	SPD
West Berlin			Jürgen Grimming (Note: Jürgen Grimming took office on 18 June 1975, to succeed Gottfried Wurche.)	SPD
West Berlin			Peter Männing (Note: Peter Männing took office on 19 June 1975, to succeed Roelf Heyen.)	SPD
West Berlin			Franz Amrehn	CDU
West Berlin			Lieselotte Berger	CDU
West Berlin			Johann Baptist Gradl	CDU
West Berlin			Gerhard Kunz	CDU
West Berlin			Johannes Müller	CDU
West Berlin			Liselotte Pieser	CDU
West Berlin			Klaus-Peter Schulz	CDU
West Berlin			Günter Straßmeir	CDU
West Berlin			Jürgen Wohlrabe	CDU
West Berlin			Hans-Günter Hoppe	FDP

== See also ==
- Politics of Germany
- List of Bundestag Members
