= Düsseldorf I =

Federal electoral district of Germany

105 Düsseldorf I
- Electoral district for the Bundestag
- Düsseldorf I in 2025
- State: North Rhine-Westphalia
- Population: 331,800 (2019)
- Electorate: 220,827 (2021)
- Major settlements: Düsseldorf (partial)
- Area: 129.6 km^{2}

Current electoral district
- Created: 1949
- Party: CDU
- Member: Thomas Jarzombek
- Elected: 2009, 2013, 2017, 2021, 2025

Düsseldorf I is an electoral constituency (German: Wahlkreis) represented in the Bundestag. It elects one member via first-past-the-post voting. Under the current constituency numbering system, it is designated as constituency 105. It is located in western North Rhine-Westphalia, comprising the northern part of the city of Düsseldorf.

Düsseldorf I was created for the inaugural 1949 federal election. Since 2009, it has been represented by Thomas Jarzombek of the Christian Democratic Union (CDU).

== Geography ==
Düsseldorf I is located in western North Rhine-Westphalia. As of the 2021 federal election, it comprises the northern part of the independent city of Düsseldorf, specifically districts 1, 2, 4, 5, 6, and 7.

== History ==
Düsseldorf I was created in 1949. In the 1949 election, it was North Rhine-Westphalia constituency 19 in the numbering system. From 1953 through 1961, it was number 78. From 1965 through 1998, it was number 74. From 2002 through 2009, it was number 107. In the 2013 through 2021 elections, it was number 106. From the 2025 election, it has been number 105.

Originally, the constituency comprised the modern districts 1, 3 (excluding Oberbilk), 4, 5 (excluding Angermund, Kalkum, and Wittlaer), and Lichtenbroich and Unterrath from 6. From 1965 through 1976, it comprised districts 4, 5 (excluding Angermund, Kalkum, and Wittlaer), Lichtenbroich and Unterrach from 6, and Derendorf, Golzheim, and Pempelfort from 1. It acquired its current borders in the 1980 election.

Election	No.	Name	Borders
1949	19	Düsseldorf I	Düsseldorf city (only 1, 3 (excluding Oberbilk), 4, 5 (excluding Angermund, Kalkum, and Wittlaer), and 6 (only Lichtenbroich and Unterrath) districts)
1953	78	Düsseldorf I	Düsseldorf city (only 1, 3 (excluding Oberbilk), 4, 5 (excluding Angermund, Kalkum, and Wittlaer), and 6 (only Lichtenbroich and Unterrath) districts)
1957	78	Düsseldorf I	Düsseldorf city (only 1, 3 (excluding Oberbilk), 4, 5 (excluding Angermund, Kalkum, and Wittlaer), and 6 (only Lichtenbroich and Unterrath) districts)
1961	78	Düsseldorf I	Düsseldorf city (only 1, 3 (excluding Oberbilk), 4, 5 (excluding Angermund, Kalkum, and Wittlaer), and 6 (only Lichtenbroich and Unterrath) districts)
1965	74	Düsseldorf I	Düsseldorf city (only 1 (only Derendorf, Golzheim, and Pempelfort), 4, 5 (excluding Angermund, Kalkum, and Wittlaer), and 6 (only Lichtenbroich and Unterrath) districts)
1969	74	Düsseldorf I	Düsseldorf city (only 1 (only Derendorf, Golzheim, and Pempelfort), 4, 5 (excluding Angermund, Kalkum, and Wittlaer), and 6 (only Lichtenbroich and Unterrath) districts)
1972	74	Düsseldorf I	Düsseldorf city (only 1 (only Derendorf, Golzheim, and Pempelfort), 4, 5 (excluding Angermund, Kalkum, and Wittlaer), and 6 (only Lichtenbroich and Unterrath) districts)
1976	74	Düsseldorf I	Düsseldorf city (only 1 (only Derendorf, Golzheim, and Pempelfort), 4, 5 (excluding Angermund, Kalkum, and Wittlaer), and 6 (only Lichtenbroich and Unterrath) districts)
1980	74	Düsseldorf I	Düsseldorf city (only 1, 2, 4, 5, 6, and 7 districts)
1983	74	Düsseldorf I	Düsseldorf city (only 1, 2, 4, 5, 6, and 7 districts)
1987	74	Düsseldorf I	Düsseldorf city (only 1, 2, 4, 5, 6, and 7 districts)
1990	74	Düsseldorf I	Düsseldorf city (only 1, 2, 4, 5, 6, and 7 districts)
1994	74	Düsseldorf I	Düsseldorf city (only 1, 2, 4, 5, 6, and 7 districts)
1998	74	Düsseldorf I	Düsseldorf city (only 1, 2, 4, 5, 6, and 7 districts)
2002	107	Düsseldorf I	Düsseldorf city (only 1, 2, 4, 5, 6, and 7 districts)
2005	107	Düsseldorf I	Düsseldorf city (only 1, 2, 4, 5, 6, and 7 districts)
2009	107	Düsseldorf I	Düsseldorf city (only 1, 2, 4, 5, 6, and 7 districts)
2013	106	Düsseldorf I	Düsseldorf city (only 1, 2, 4, 5, 6, and 7 districts)
2017	106	Düsseldorf I	Düsseldorf city (only 1, 2, 4, 5, 6, and 7 districts)
2021	106	Düsseldorf I	Düsseldorf city (only 1, 2, 4, 5, 6, and 7 districts)
2025	105	Düsseldorf I	Düsseldorf city (only 1, 2, 4, 5, 6, and 7 districts)

== Members ==
The constituency has been held by the Christian Democratic Union (CDU) during all but two Bundestag terms since 1949. It was first represented by Robert Lehr of the CDU from 1949 to 1953. He was succeeded by Josef Gockeln from 1953 to 1961, followed by Gottfried Arnold until 1983. Wolfgang Schulhoff then served as representative until 1998, when Michael Müller of the Social Democratic Party (SPD) was elected. He was re-elected in 2002, but Hildegard Müller regained the constituency for the CDU in 2005. Fellow CDU member Thomas Jarzombek was elected in 2009, and re-elected in 2013, 2017, 2021, and 2025.

Election	Member	Party	%
1949	Robert Lehr	CDU	42.5
1953	Josef Gockeln	CDU	58.0
1957	Josef Gockeln	CDU	59.7
1961	Gottfried Arnold	CDU	48.9
1965	Gottfried Arnold	CDU	50.5
1969	Gottfried Arnold	CDU	45.4
1972	Gottfried Arnold	CDU	43.9
1976	Gottfried Arnold	CDU	48.7
1980	Gottfried Arnold	CDU	43.8
1983	Wolfgang Schulhoff	CDU	49.7
1987	Wolfgang Schulhoff	CDU	45.4
1990	Wolfgang Schulhoff	CDU	42.6
1994	Wolfgang Schulhoff	CDU	43.9
1998	Michael Müller	SPD	44.7
2002	Michael Müller	SPD	44.1
2005	Hildegard Müller	CDU	44.6
2009	Thomas Jarzombek	CDU	43.5
2013	Thomas Jarzombek	CDU	47.9
2017	Thomas Jarzombek	CDU	40.4
2021	Thomas Jarzombek	CDU	31.1
2025	Thomas Jarzombek	CDU	36.1

== Election results ==
=== 2025 election ===
Federal election (2025): Düsseldorf I
Notes:	Blue background denotes the winner of the electorate vote. Pink background denotes a candidate elected from their party list. Yellow background denotes an electorate win by a list member, or other incumbent. A ✓ or ✗ denotes status of any incumbent, win or lose respectively.						
Party	Candidate	Votes	%	±%	Party votes	%	±%
CDU	✓ Thomas Jarzombek	67,108	36.1	▲5.0	56,461	30.3	▲4.6
SPD	Zanda Martens	39,356	21.2	▼1.2	32,067	17.2	▼4.7
Greens	Anas Al-Qura’an	32,269	17.4	▼3.8	34,053	18.3	▼4.4
AfD	Andrea Kraljic	18,227	9.8	▲5.8	18,536	9.9	▲5.6
Left	Julia Marmulla	13,321	7.2	▲4.2	17,731	9.5	▲5.7
FDP	Moritz Kracht	9,883	5.3	▼8.6	14,546	7.8	▼8.1
BSW					6,791	3.6	
Volt	Jennifer Scharpenberg	3,344	1.8	▲0.9	1,839	1.0	▲0.4
Tierschutzpartei					1,561	0.8	▼0.1
FW	Burkhard Harting	1,026	0.6	▼0.1	469	0.3	▼0.2
BD	Alexander Giannakis	839	0.5		249	0.1	
PARTEI				▼1.5	817	0.4	▼0.5
PdF					324	0.2	▲0.1
MLPD	Paul Straif	292	0.2	▲0.1	92	0.0	0.0
Team Todenhöfer					274	0.1	▼0.6
dieBasis				▼1.0	270	0.1	▼0.7
MERA25					108	0.1	
Values					106	0.1	
Pirates							▼0.3
Humanists							▼0.1
Gesundheitsforschung							▼0.1
ÖDP							▼0.1
Bündnis C							0.0
SGP						0.0	0.0
Informal votes		1,392			763		
Total valid votes		185,665			186,294		
Turnout		187,057	83.3	▲4.0			
CDU hold	Majority	27,752	14.9				

=== 2021 election ===
Federal election (2021): Düsseldorf I
Notes:	Blue background denotes the winner of the electorate vote. Pink background denotes a candidate elected from their party list. Yellow background denotes an electorate win by a list member, or other incumbent. A ✓ or ✗ denotes status of any incumbent, win or lose respectively.						
Party	Candidate	Votes	%	±%	Party votes	%	±%
CDU	✓ Thomas Jarzombek	54,158	31.1	▼9.3	44,892	25.8	▼6.3
SPD	Zanda Martens	38,955	22.4	▼2.1	38,195	21.9	▲2.4
Greens	Frederik Hartmann	36,926	21.2	▲12.8	39,452	22.6	▲12.7
FDP	Marie-Agnes Strack-Zimmermann	24,242	13.9	▲1.1	27,743	15.9	▼3.8
AfD	Andrea Kraljic	7,002	4.0	▼2.3	7,495	4.3	▼2.7
Left	Helmut Born	5,094	2.9	▼4.4	6,741	3.9	▼4.7
Tierschutzpartei					1,635	0.9	▲0.3
PARTEI	Jan Knichala	2,531	1.5		1,561	0.9	▲0.1
dieBasis	Susanne Bachmann	1,802	1.0		1,535	0.9	
Team Todenhöfer					1,315	0.8	
Volt	Jennifer Scharpenberg	1,546	0.9		1,108	0.6	
FW	Burkhard Harting	1,089	0.6		851	0.5	▲0.3
Pirates					516	0.3	▼0.1
Independent	Lara Baumanns	423	0.2				
Humanists					165	0.1	0.0
LfK					147	0.1	
V-Partei3					145	0.1	0.0
Gesundheitsforschung					143	0.1	0.0
LIEBE					139	0.1	
ÖDP					110	0.1	0.0
du.					89	0.1	
NPD					84	0.0	▼0.1
PdF					52	0.0	
MLPD	Paul Straif	104	0.1	▼0.1	49	0.0	0.0
DKP					45	0.0	0.0
LKR	Nadin Lindermann	76	0.0		42	0.0	
Bündnis C					42	0.0	
SGP					12	0.0	0.0
Informal votes		1,162			807		
Total valid votes		173,948			174,303		
Turnout		175,110	79.3	▲1.0			
CDU hold	Majority	15,203	8.7	▼7.2			

=== 2017 election ===
Federal election (2017): Düsseldorf I
Notes:	Blue background denotes the winner of the electorate vote. Pink background denotes a candidate elected from their party list. Yellow background denotes an electorate win by a list member, or other incumbent. A ✓ or ✗ denotes status of any incumbent, win or lose respectively.						
Party	Candidate	Votes	%	±%	Party votes	%	±%
CDU	✓ Thomas Jarzombek	69,273	40.4	▼7.4	55,052	32.0	▼8.3
SPD	Philipp Tacer	41,903	24.4	▼4.8	33,493	19.5	▼7.0
FDP	Marie-Agnes Strack-Zimmermann	21,944	12.8	▲9.2	33,940	19.7	▲10.6
Greens	Paula Elsholz	14,408	8.4	▲0.2	17,148	10.0	▲0.5
Left	Udo Bonn	12,611	7.4	▲2.1	14,675	8.5	▲2.1
AfD	Guido Dietel	10,912	6.4	▲3.3	12,029	7.0	▲2.8
Tierschutzpartei					1,024	0.6	
PARTEI					1,417	0.8	▲0.5
Pirates					620	0.4	▼1.8
AD-DEMOKRATEN					444	0.3	
DiB					328	0.2	
FW					310	0.2	0.0
BGE					213	0.1	
NPD					204	0.1	▼0.4
V-Partei³					203	0.1	
DM					163	0.1	
Die Humanisten					138	0.1	
ÖDP					130	0.1	0.0
MLPD	Herbert Nussbaum	336	0.2	▲0.1	121	0.1	0.0
Gesundheitsforschung					105	0.1	
Volksabstimmung					93	0.1	▼0.1
DKP					46	0.0	
SGP					14	0.0	0.0
Informal votes		1,560			1,037		
Total valid votes		171,387			171,910		
Turnout		172,947	78.3	▲2.9			
CDU hold	Majority	27,370	16.0	▼2.7			

=== 2013 election ===
Federal election (2013): Düsseldorf I
Notes:	Blue background denotes the winner of the electorate vote. Pink background denotes a candidate elected from their party list. Yellow background denotes an electorate win by a list member, or other incumbent. A ✓ or ✗ denotes status of any incumbent, win or lose respectively.						
Party	Candidate	Votes	%	±%	Party votes	%	±%
CDU	✓ Thomas Jarzombek	78,206	47.9	▲4.4	65,978	40.3	▲7.0
SPD	Philipp Tacer	47,731	29.2	▲0.7	43,269	26.4	▲3.9
Greens	Mona Neubaur	13,427	8.2	▼1.8	15,445	9.4	▼3.2
Left	Helmut Born	8,657	5.3	▼1.2	10,505	6.4	▼1.1
FDP	Gisela Piltz	5,825	3.6	▼6.9	14,985	9.2	▼10.8
AfD	Kerstin Garbracht	5,021	3.1		6,891	4.2	
Pirates	Frank Grenda	3,063	1.9		3,458	2.1	▲0.5
NPD	Angelina Schulze	824	0.5	▼0.3	770	0.5	0.0
PARTEI					541	0.3	
REP	André Maniera	466	0.3		379	0.2	▼0.2
FW					241	0.1	
Volksabstimmung					202	0.1	▲0.1
PRO					201	0.1	
Nichtwahler					187	0.1	
ÖDP					182	0.1	0.0
BIG					126	0.1	
Party of Reason					89	0.1	
MLPD	Kai Müller-Horn	173	0.1	0.0	81	0.0	0.0
RRP					63	0.0	▼0.1
BüSo					33	0.0	0.0
PSG					28	0.0	0.0
Die Rechte					21	0.0	
Informal votes		1,635			1,353		
Total valid votes		163,393			163,675		
Turnout		165,028	75.4	▲2.3			
CDU hold	Majority	30,475	18.7	▲3.8			

=== 2009 election ===
Federal election (2009): Düsseldorf I
Notes:	Blue background denotes the winner of the electorate vote. Pink background denotes a candidate elected from their party list. Yellow background denotes an electorate win by a list member, or other incumbent. A ✓ or ✗ denotes status of any incumbent, win or lose respectively.						
Party	Candidate	Votes	%	±%	Party votes	%	±%
CDU	Thomas Jarzombek	68,749	43.5	▼1.1	52,747	33.3	▼2.1
SPD	Michael Müller	45,125	28.6	▼12.0	35,625	22.5	▼11.1
FDP	Gisela Piltz	16,472	10.4	▲5.2	31,626	20.0	▲5.7
Greens	Mona Neubaur	15,894	10.1	▲4.9	19,967	12.6	▲3.0
Left	Helmut Born	10,266	6.5	▲2.8	11,962	7.6	▲2.7
Pirates					2,554	1.6	
Tierschutzpartei					876	0.6	▲0.2
NPD	Manfred Helmut Breidbach	1,304	0.8	▲0.2	804	0.5	0.0
REP					734	0.5	▲0.2
RENTNER					439	0.3	
FAMILIE					405	0.3	0.0
RRP					155	0.1	
Volksabstimmung					114	0.1	0.0
ÖDP					104	0.1	
Centre					90	0.1	0.0
MLPD	Kai Müller-Horn	204	0.1	0.0	71	0.0	0.0
DVU					47	0.0	
BüSo					38	0.0	0.0
PSG					28	0.0	0.0
Informal votes		1,586			1,214		
Total valid votes		158,014			158,386		
Turnout		159,600	73.1	▼5.7			
CDU hold	Majority	23,624	14.9	▲10.9			

=== 2005 election ===
Federal election (2005): Düsseldorf I
Notes:	Blue background denotes the winner of the electorate vote. Pink background denotes a candidate elected from their party list. Yellow background denotes an electorate win by a list member, or other incumbent. A ✓ or ✗ denotes status of any incumbent, win or lose respectively.						
Party	Candidate	Votes	%	±%	Party votes	%	±%
CDU	Hildegard Müller	74,976	44.6	▲4.2	59,644	35.4	▼0.2
SPD	✗ Michael Müller	68,314	40.6	▼3.5	56,672	33.6	▼3.0
FDP	Gisela Piltz	8,763	5.2	▼2.0	23,983	14.2	▲2.5
Greens	Clara Deilmann	8,624	5.1	▼0.48	16,217	9.6	▼2.7
Left	Helmut Born	6,239	3.7	▲2.6	8,180	4.9	▲3.4
NPD	Paul Mock	1,129	0.7		818	0.5	▲0.3
GRAUEN					997	0.6	▲0.3
Tierschutzpartei					642	0.4	
REP					480	0.3	
Familie					358	0.2	▲0.1
MLPD	Kai Müller-Horn	188	0.1		107	0.1	
PBC					117	0.1	
From Now on... Democracy Through Referendum					110	0.1	
BüSo					56	0.0	
Centre					53	0.0	
Socialist Equality Party					49	0.0	
Informal votes		1,771			1,519		
Total valid votes		168,233			168,485		
Turnout		170,004	78.8	▼9.3			
CDU gain from SPD	Majority	6,662	4.00				
