= Hildegard Müller =

German politician (born 1967)

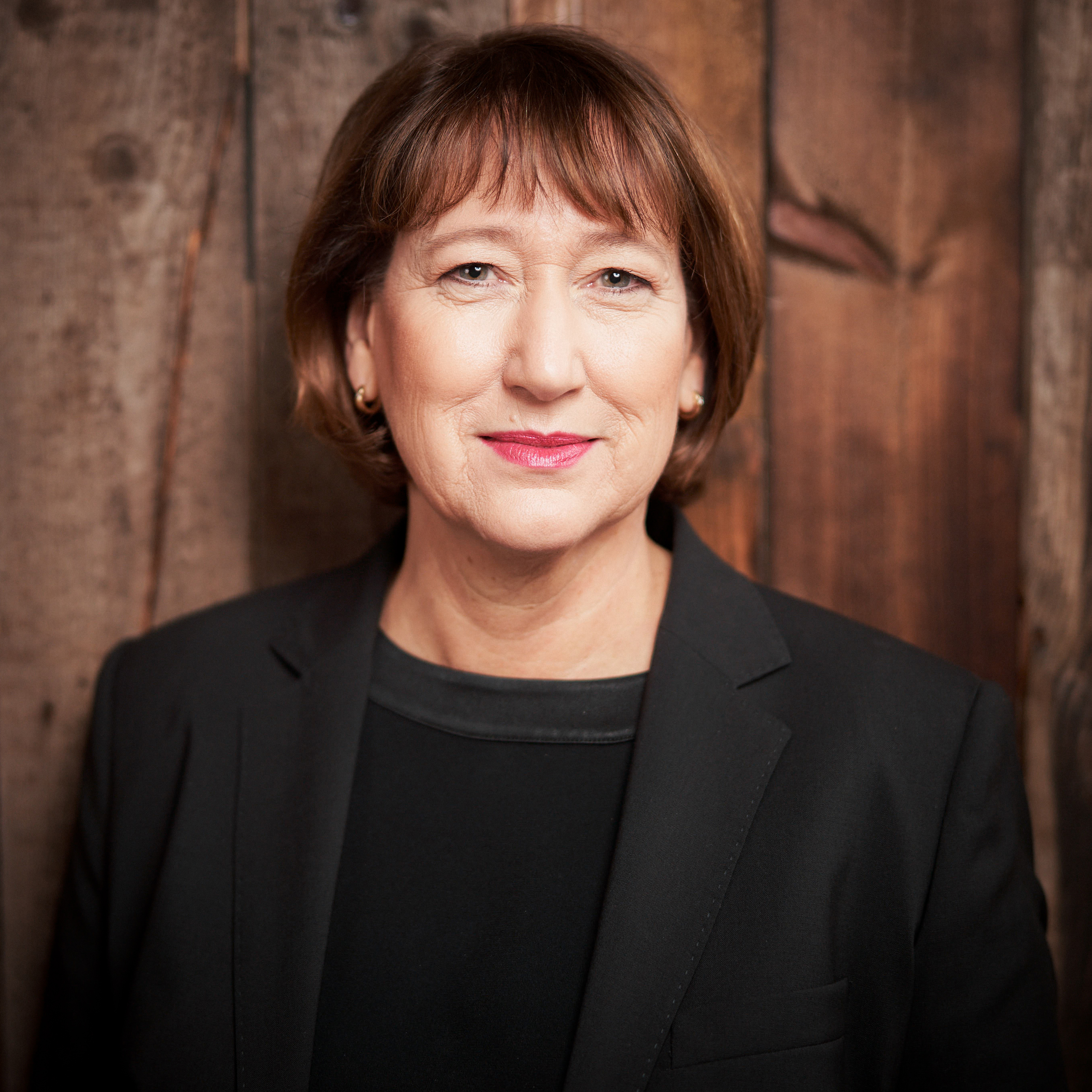
- Müller in 2020

Member of the Bundestag
- In office 17 October 2002 – 1 October 2008
- Succeeded by: Thomas Mahlberg
- Constituency: North Rhine-Westphalia (2002–2005); Düsseldorf I (2005–2008)

Personal details
- Born: 29 June 1967 (age 59) Rheine
- Party: Christian Democratic Union

Hildegard Müller (born 29 June 1967 in Rheine) is a German politician serving as president of the Verband der Automobilindustrie since 2020. From 2002 to 2008, she was a member of the Bundestag. From 2005 to 2008, she served as minister of state of the Federal Chancellery. From 1998 to 2002, she served as chairwoman of the Young Union.
