= Zanda Martens =

German politician

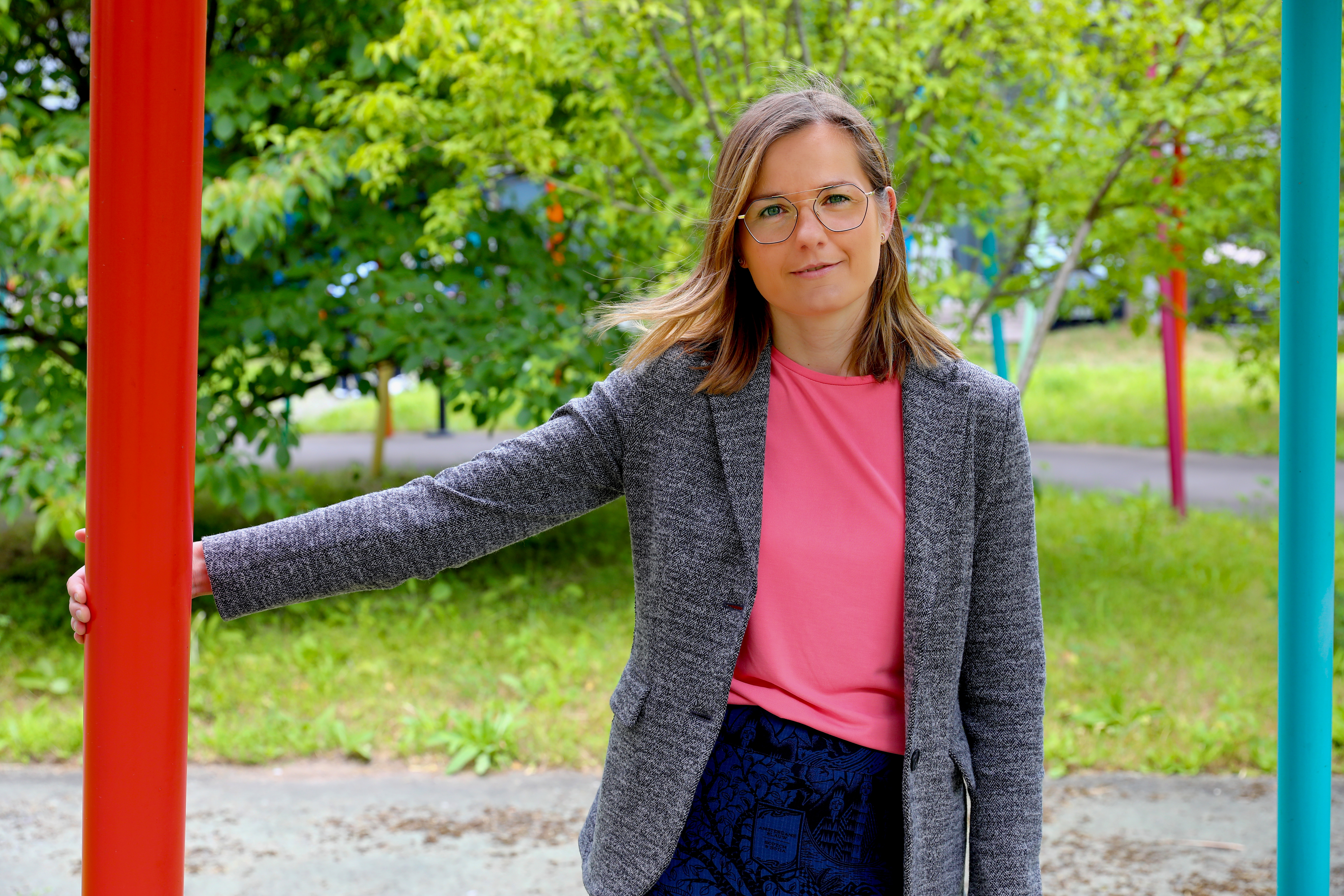

Member of the Bundestag
- Incumbent
- Assumed office 2021

Personal details
- Born: 1 October 1984 (age 42) Liepāja
- Party: SPD
- Education: University of Latvia; Ruhr University Bochum; University of Bremen

Zanda Martena (germanized Zanda Martens born 1 October 1984 in Liepāja, Latvia) is a Latvian-German politician of the Social Democratic Party (SPD) who has been serving as member of the Bundestag, since 2021. She is a full member of the Legal Affairs Committee and committee chair of the European Law Subcommittee.

== Life ==
Zanda Martens (Latvian spelling: Zanda Martena) was born into a working-class family in the Latvian SSR, her parents were employed in a steel mill. After attending school, she studied law at the University of Latvia from 2002 to 2008 with the help of a scholarship. After obtaining a Master of Law, she worked as a lawyer for the board of the Latvian Confederation of Trade Unions (LBAS) from 2008 to 2010. In 2010, she moved to Düsseldorf for personal reasons and acquired German citizenship. She took a course of study for graduates of law studies abroad at the Ruhr University Bochum from 2010 to 2012, from which she graduated with the academic degree Magister Legum (LL.M.). This was followed by doctoral studies at the University of Bremen from 2018 to 2021.

Martens worked as a legal secretary at DGB Rechtsschutz GmbH from 2012 to 2013 and then worked as a trade union secretary for the Vereinte Dienstleistungsgewerkschaft in the Düsseldorf district and in the management of the state district department for postal services, freight forwarding and logistics until 2019. Since 2019, she has been working as a trade union secretary/lawyer for IG Metall.

== Political career ==
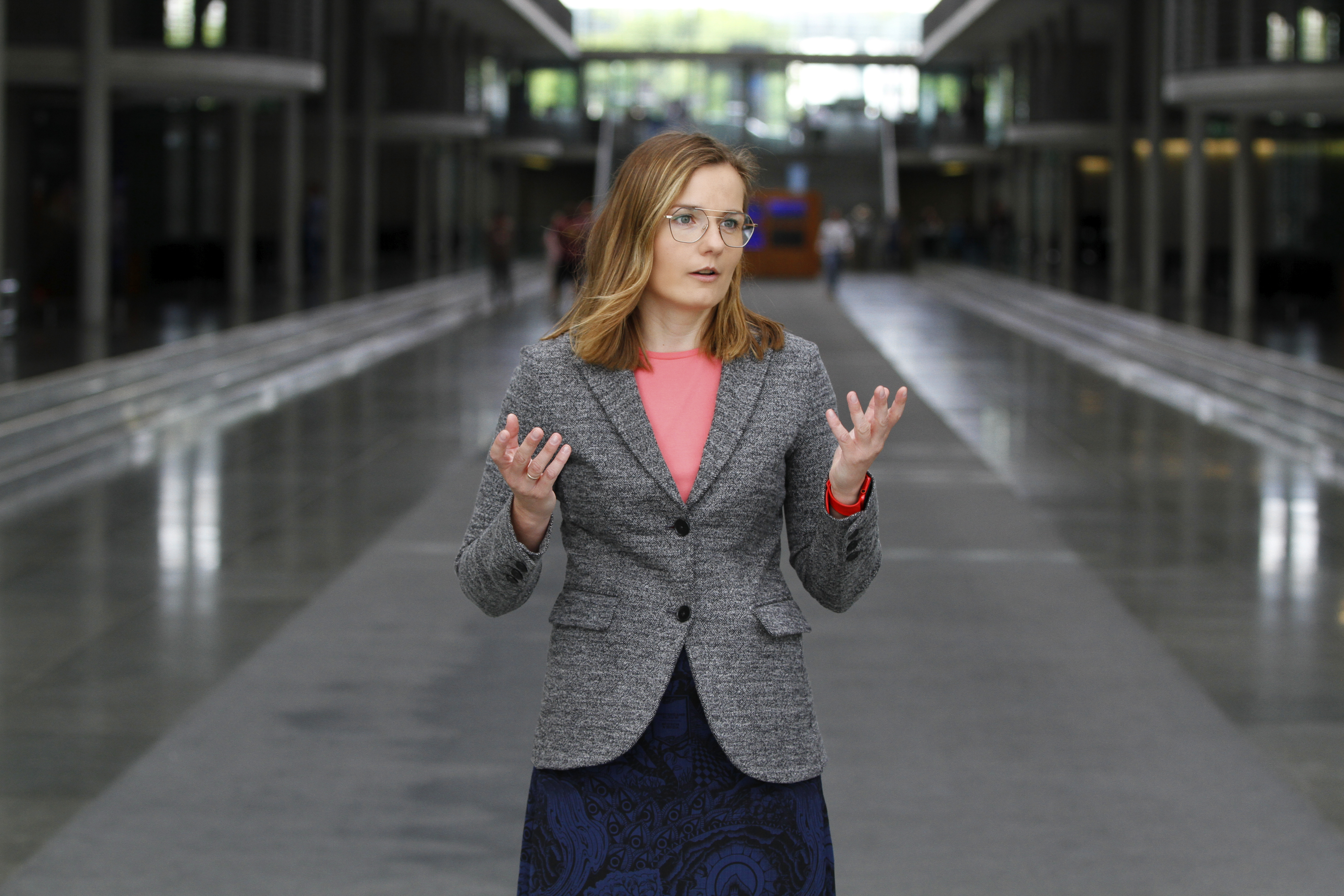
Zanda Martens – YouTube

Martens joined the SPD in January 2018. She was deputy chairwoman of the Arbeitsgemeinschaft für Arbeit (AfA) Düsseldorf from 2019 to 2023 and deputy chairwoman of the SPD subdistrict Düsseldorf from 2021 to 2023. She has been the chairwoman of the SPD Düsseldorf since 2023. Since March 2021, she has been a member of the state executive committee of SPD North Rhine-Westphalia, her party's regional branch in North-Rhine-Westphalia.

Martens became a member of the Bundestag in the 2021 elections, representing the Düsseldorf I district. In parliament, she has been serving on the Committee on Legal Affairs and chairing its Subcommittee on European Law. She is her parliamentary group’s rapporteur on passengers’ rights.

In addition to her committee assignments, Martens has been an alternate member of the German delegation to the NATO Parliamentary Assembly since 2022. In this capacity, she has been serving on the Economics and Security Committee and its Subcommittee on Transition and Development.

Within her parliamentary group, Martens belongs to the Parliamentary Left, a left-wing movement.

In the 2021 federal election, Martens stood as the SPD's direct candidate in constituency 106 (Düsseldorf I). She received 22.4% of the first votes and entered the German Bundestag via position 28 on the state list of the SPD of North Rhine-Westphalia. She is a full member of the Legal Affairs Committee, a deputy member of the Foreign Affairs Committee and chairwoman of the Subcommittee on European Law in the 20th Bundestag. She is a member of the 2nd Committee of Inquiry of the 20th legislative period of the German Bundestag.

== Other activities ==
- Düsseldorf Airport, Member of the Supervisory Board (since 2022)
- IG Metall, Member (since 2011)
