= Friedhelm Farthmann =

German politician (1930–2024)

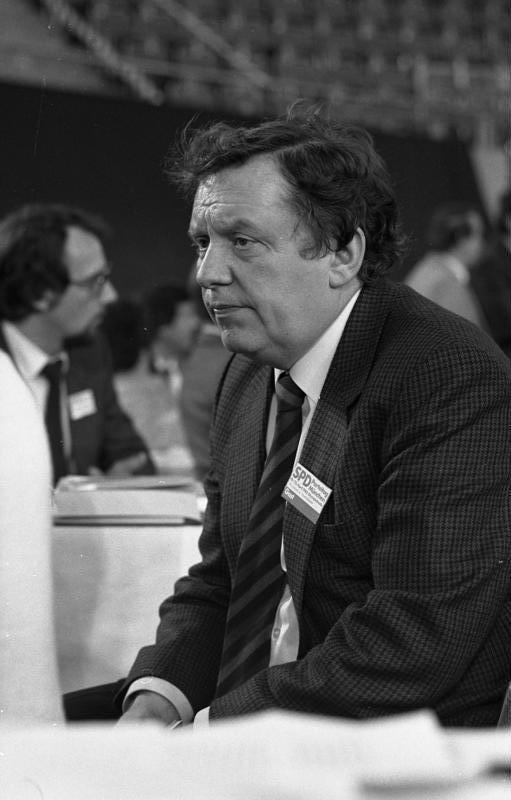
- Farthmann in 1982

Member of the Bundestag
- In office 26 January 1971 – 13 December 1976
- Constituency: Neuss II (1972–1976)

Member of the Landtag of North Rhine-Westphalia
- In office 29 May 1980 – 1 June 2000

Personal details
- Born: 25 November 1930 Bad Oeynhausen, Westphalia, Prussia, Germany
- Died: 9 December 2024 (aged 94)
- Party: SPD
- Education: University of Göttingen
- Occupation: Academic

Friedhelm Farthmann (25 November 1930 – 9 December 2024) was a German academic and politician. A member of the Social Democratic Party, he served in the Bundestag from 1971 to 1976 and in the Landtag of North Rhine-Westphalia from 1980 to 2000.

Farthmann was minister of labour, health and social (Arbeit, Gesundheit und Soziales) in North Rhine-Westphalia from 1975 to 1985, and leader of the SPD fraction in the Landtag from 1985 to 1995.

Farthmann died on 9 December 2024, at the age of 94.
