= Wolfgang Schulhoff =

German politician

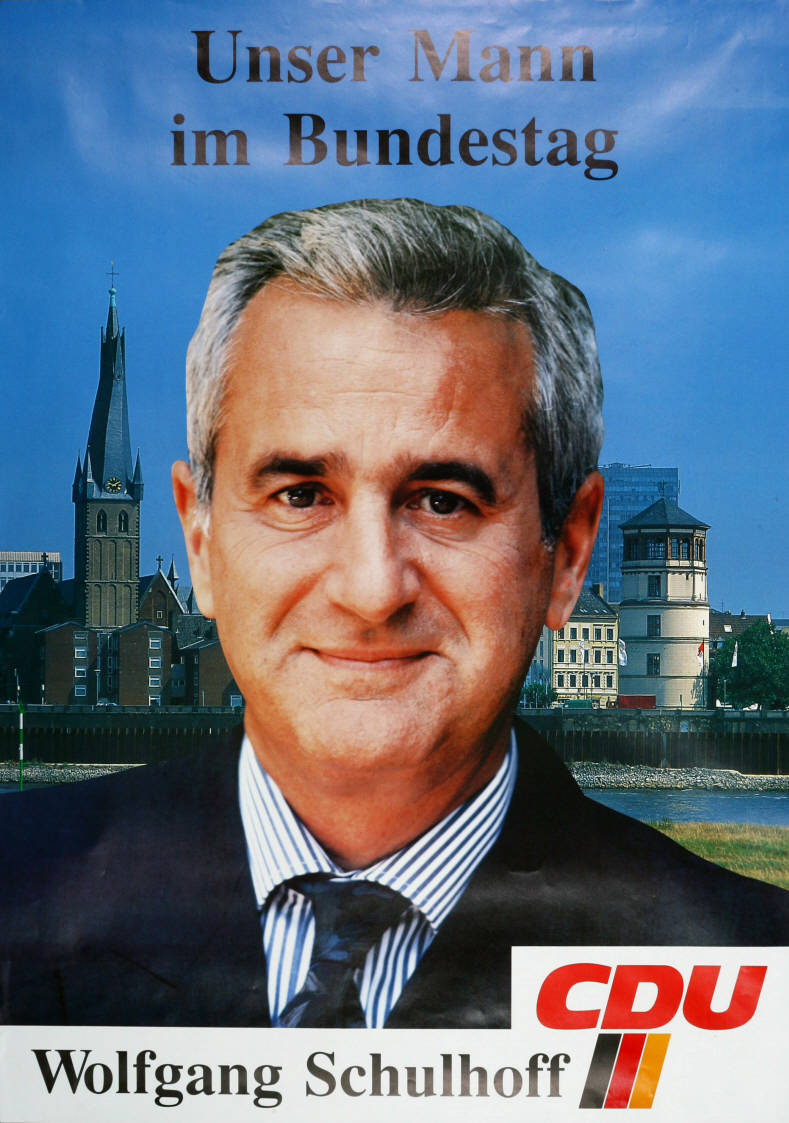
Wolfgang Schulhoff

Wolfgang Schulhoff (14 December 1939 – 17 February 2014) was a German politician. He was a member of the Bundestag, representing Düsseldorf. He was also a member of the CDU.
