= Karl Wienand =

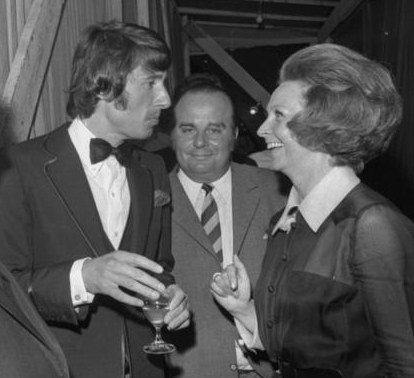
Wienand (middle) with Udo Jürgens and Rut Brandt

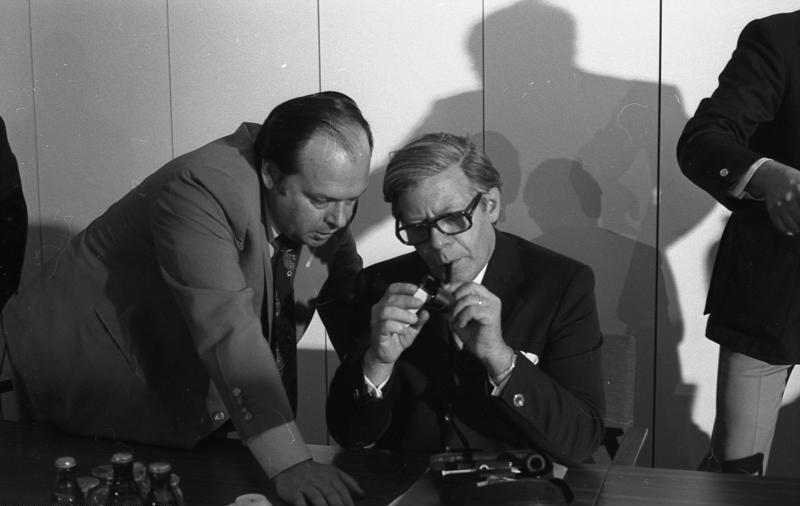
Wienand (left) together with Helmut Schmidt (1974)

Karl Wienand (15 December 1926 – 10 October 2011) was a German politician of the Social Democratic Party (SPD) and secret agent for the DDR's Ministry of State Security (MfS).

== Life ==
Karl Wienand was born 15 December 1926 in Lindenpütz. His father, a German communist party member, was frequently detained as an enemy of the Nazi regime and often demonstrated against Robert Ley. The Nazis would later kill the man.

After distinguishing himself attending Volksschule, Wienand fils was sent in 1941 to the normal schools in Bad Godesberg and Xanten. He performed military service in the Second World War in a penal battalion and was severely wounded. He suffered a head injury and a dislocated shoulder; he also needed a leg amputated. He thus qualified as a "70% casualty".

He was widowed twice, and (step)father to five children. One son of his first wife died in an accident. In 1975, he became director of the "Gesellschaft für kosmetische plastische Chirurgie und Ästhetik mbH Klinik International".

Wienand died on the 10th of October in 2011 in Trier.

== Party work ==
Wienand applied to enter the Nazi party on 9 October 1943, and would be enrolled on 20 April 1944 (as member #10.014.358). In 1947, Wienand attached himself to the SPD. In 1950, he was selected as SPD block captain (German: Unterbezirk) for the Rhein-Sieg-Kreis. Already by 1951 he had advanced to the Mittelrhein committee (German: Bezirk) and by 1955 the central party council (German: Parteirat). In 1990, he resigned from politics. In 2002, he left the SPD, anticipating a censure motion (German: Parteiausschluss).

Per Herbert Wehner, Wienand was a "Mann für heikle Fälle [man with a deft touch]". In the view of the historian Arnulf Baring, he belongs "zum sozialliberalen Kernbereich, zur Handvoll ihrer wichtigsten Figuren [to the central core of social liberalism, the most important handful of figures]".

== Legislative work ==
In 1952, Wienand was the Bürgermeister of Rosbach in Windeck. Following the 1953 German legislative election, Karl Wienand became the youngest representative in the second German Bundestag, at the age of 26. From 15 November 1963 to 13 April 1967 he was deputy chairman of the Bundestag's committee on defense. From 3 March 1964 to 27 April 1967 he headed the SPD's parliamentary working group on national security. From 7 March 1967 to 30 August 1974, Wienand was Chief Whip. His time in the Bundestag lapsed beginning 3 December 1974.

== Scandals and aftermath ==
Wienand was ensnared in a series of political scandals, and was convicted multiple times.

=== Paninternational ===
In the Paninternational Flight 112 disaster on 6 September 1971, 22 people died during an emergency landing on the Autobahn outside Hamburg. Wienand, in return for roughly 162,500 Deutsche Marks (DM), had allegedly shielded the airline from the inspection of the Federal Aviation Office. A parliamentary inquiry on the issue was opened but could not reach any firm conclusions due to partisanship.

=== Vote of no confidence ===
In a vote of no confidence against Chancellor Willy Brandt in 1972, Wienand supposedly paid the CDU representative Julius Steiner 50,000 DM to abstain, a scandal which became known as the "Steiner-Wienand affair". As much was admitted in a 1973 press conference following Steiner's second resignation from the Bundestag. Later it was revealed that Steiner had obtained 50,000 DM from the MfS; whether he had been paid twice is unclear.

=== Tax evasion ===
In 1973, Wienand was stripped of his immunity as a Bundestag member following tax evasion. In 1975 he is believed to have owed altogether 102,000 DM in taxes – not to mention taxes on money received from Paninternational.

=== Espionage ===
In 1993, federal prosecutors at the Federal Prosecutor's Office encountered a description of a covert agent in Main Directorate for Reconnaissance (HVA) records that placed them on Wienand's trail. Starting in June 1959, the MfS had managed Wienand as a possible unofficial collaborator (German: Inoffizieller Mitarbeiter (IM) Vorlauf) code-named "Streit". In 1971, he was accepted as a penetrative unofficial collaborator (German: IM mit besonderen Aufgaben) and renamed in the records as "Kontaktperson". In 1988, he was reregistered as an intelligence source. The prosecutors alleged that from 1970 to 1989 he had secretly worked with the MfS' HVA. The Düsseldorf regional court (German: Oberlandesgericht Düsseldorf) deemed his punishable work to begin in 1976, as he previously had a protection for official speech, and sentenced him in 1996 on account of his espionage for the DDR to two and a half years' time in prison and financial penalties equivalent to the amount of funds Wienand had received from the MfS: 1 million DM. According to the memoirs of the HVA head Markus Wolf, Wienand had been in contact with DDR foreign agents since the end of the 1960s. The Federal Court of Justice (BGH) rejected Wienand's cassatory appeal on 28 November 1997, which was the final court of appeals for the Düsseldorfer jurisdiction. Thereafter German president Roman Herzog commuted his sentence to five years' probation on account of Wienand's heart disease.

Wienand denied the accusations until his death.

=== Cologner funds affair ===
Wienand took millions in bribes for planning and construction of the Cologne waste incinerator (MVA). Allegedly, he was an accomplice to corruption, bribery, and tax evasion. In 2002, he spent three months in pre-trial detention (German: Untersuchungshaft), before the Cologne regional court (German: Oberlandesgericht Köln), on account of deteriorating health, let him instead provide sureties against flight (surrendering his passport and personal ID, as well as performing thrice-weekly check-ins at the local police station). These conditions were then lifted in August 2003 by the Cologne district court (German: Landgericht Köln). Because of his health, the investigation into Wienand could not remain open for long. On 14 December 2004, the district court sentenced him to two years' probation. The court considered it proven that he had been guilty of aiding and abetting a corrupt breach of faith. Wienand's lawyer had admitted at the start of the trial that he had received the amount of a million euros in connection with the Cologne MVA, but not the quantity of 2.1 million that the state's lawyer claimed. The BGH lifted a portion of the sentence in 2005, and Wienand had already been acquitted of parts of it in the Cologne district court.

== Writings ==
- "Der Partei oder dem Gewissen verpflichtet?" [Bound by party or conscience?]. Die Neue Gesellschaft (in German) (3): 366–371. 1970.
