= Jürgen Grimming =

German politician (1938–2023)

Member of the Bundestag
- In office 18 June 1975 – 13 December 1976
- Preceded by: Gottfried Wurche

Personal details
- Born: 23 April 1938 Berlin, Germany
- Died: 18 September 2023 (aged 85) Rottendorf, Bavaria, Germany
- Party: SPD
- Occupation: Businessman

Jürgen Grimming (23 April 1938 – 18 September 2023) was a German businessman and politician. A member of the Social Democratic Party, he served in the Bundestag from 1975 to 1976.

Grimming died in Rottendorf on 18 September 2023, at the age of 85.
