= Michael Müller (politician, born 1948) =

German politician

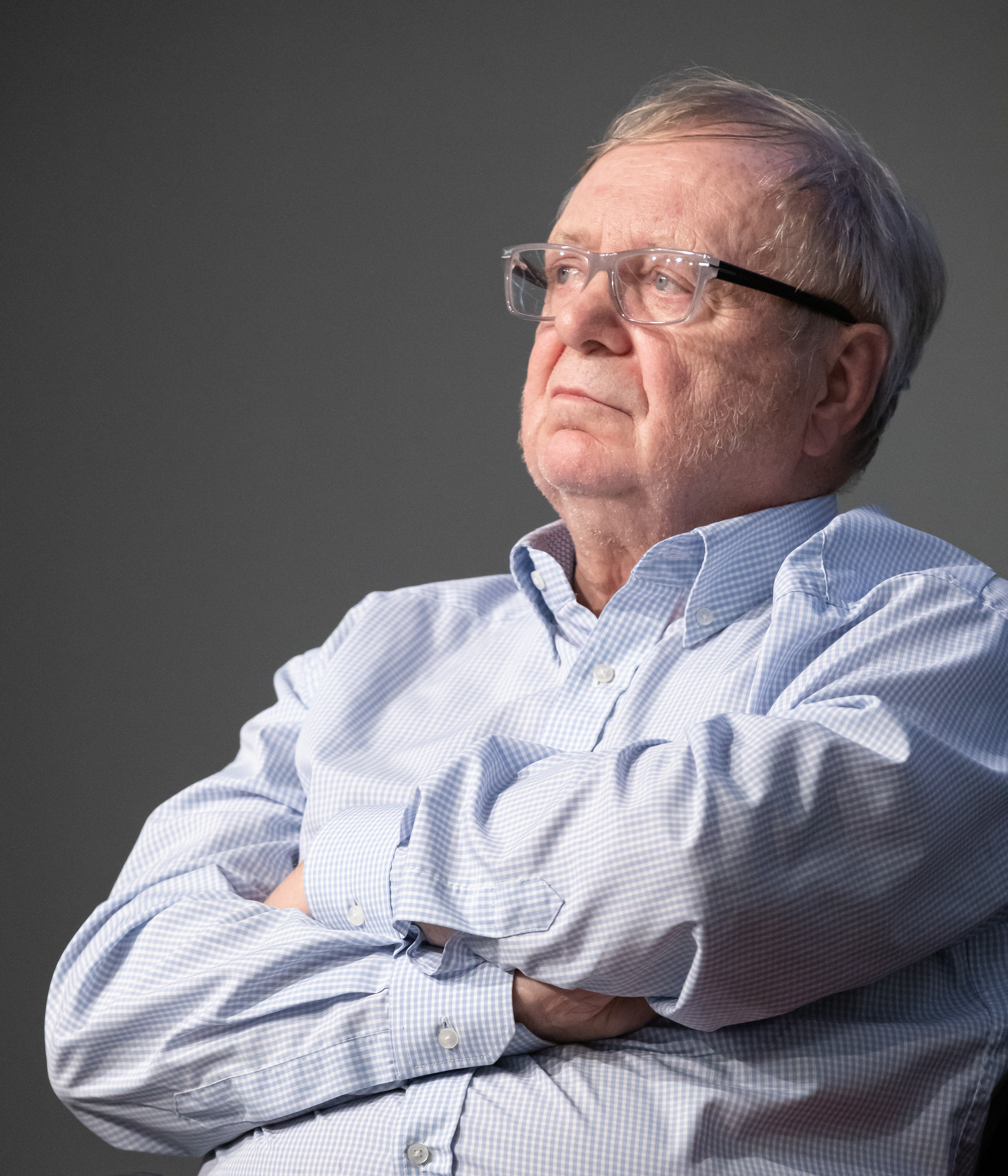
- Müller in 2019

Member of the Bundestag
- In office 29 March 1983 – 27 October 2009

Personal details
- Born: 10 July 1948 (age 77) Bernburg, Saxony-Anhalt, Soviet occupation zone of Germany
- Party: SPD

Michael Müller (born 10 July 1948) is a German politician of the Social Democratic Party (SPD) and former member of the German Bundestag.

== Life ==
Müller has been a member of the SPD since 1966. From 1972 to 1978 he was deputy federal chairman of the Young Socialists. From 1983 to 2009 he was a member of the German Bundestag. He was a directly elected member of parliament for the constituency of Düsseldorf I in the 1998 and 2002 federal elections and otherwise entered the Bundestag via the North Rhine-Westphalia state list. From 23 November 2005 to 27 October 2009 he was Parliamentary State Secretary to the Federal Minister for the Environment, Nature Conservation and Nuclear Safety.

== Literature ==
Herbst, Ludolf; Jahn, Bruno (2002). Vierhaus, Rudolf (ed.). Biographisches Handbuch der Mitglieder des Deutschen Bundestages. 1949–2002 [Biographical Handbook of the Members of the German Bundestag. 1949–2002] (in German). München: De Gruyter - De Gruyter Saur. p. 1715. ISBN 978-3-11-184511-1.
