= Barbara Lüdemann =

German politician (1922–1992)

- Lüdemann in 1974

Member of the Bundestag for Hesse
- In office 4 September 1973 – 13 December 1976
- Preceded by: Karl-Hermann Flach
- Constituency: State list

Member of the Wetzlar District Council
- In office 1964–1976

Personal details
- Born: Barbara Witte; 28 April 1922 Wetzlar, Free State of Prussia, Germany
- Died: 20 February 1992 (aged 69) Wetzlar, Hesse, Germany
- Party: Nazi Party (1941–1945); Free Democratic Party (1964–1992)
- Spouse: Christian Lüdemann (m. 1950; died 1950)
- Parent: Wilhelm Witte (father)

Barbara Lüdemann (née Witte; 28 April 1922 – 20 February 1992) was a German teacher and politician who served in the Bundestag from 1973 until 1976. A member of the Free Democratic Party from Hesse, she became a prominent figure in German family policy, especially with regards to foster care.

== Biography ==
Barbara Witte was born on 28 April 1922 in the city of Wetzlar in Hesse to mining engineer Wilhelm Witte and his wife Hildegard Große-Leege. She joined the Nazi Party on 1 September 1941; her membership number was 8,682,984. She worked on a farm from 1938 to 1942, and studied at the agricultural pedagogical institutes in Dunzig in 1942 and in Dresden from 1944 to 1945. In 1947, she completed her state certification as a teacher of agricultural science, teaching in the towns of Alsfeld, Büdingen, and Grünberg throughout her career, as well as in Wetzlar where she was the senior teacher from 1970 to 1973. She married Christian Lüdemann – the pastor of the town of Schnega – on 14 June 1950, though he died later that year.

Lüdemann joined the Free Democratic Party in 1964. Later that year, she was elected to the Wetzlar District Council, serving until 1976. She became the FDP's deputy leader in the council in 1968. Beginning in 1970, she was also the chair of the Wetzlar branch of the Rural Women's Association. On 4 September 1973, Lüdemann was appointed to the Bundestag to succeed Karl-Hermann Flach, who died in office. While in the Bundestag, she was a member of the Economic Committee and the Committee for Youth, Family and Health; a deputy member of the Committee for Labour and Social Order; and the FDP's parliamentary spokesperson on family policy.

During her tenures in the district council and the Bundestag, Lüdemann became a prominent figure in German family policy, especially with regards to foster care. As a district councillor, she organized local foster homes for children from Berlin. In the Bundestag, one of her main policy goals was to pass a law which stated that no foster child could be "returned to their biological parents against their will", and during debate on the Adoption Placement Act, she advocated for a legal remedy provision. In 1974, Lüdemann received criticism from the magazine Bunte, which accused her of "taking children out of homes". Despite her prominence and seniority, the FDP sidelined Lüdemann in the 1976 election in favor of a more junior candidate, pushing her down to 14th on the party's state list where she was not elected. She was also defeated in the Wetzlar constituency, receiving 8.7% of the vote. She left the Bundestag at the end of her term on 13 December 1976.

In 1975, Lüdemann was awarded the Federal Cross of Merit on Ribbon. She was also awarded the Certificate of Honor from the State of Hesse in 1979. Lüdemann died in Wetzlar on 20 February 1992.
