= Uwe Ronneburger =

German politician

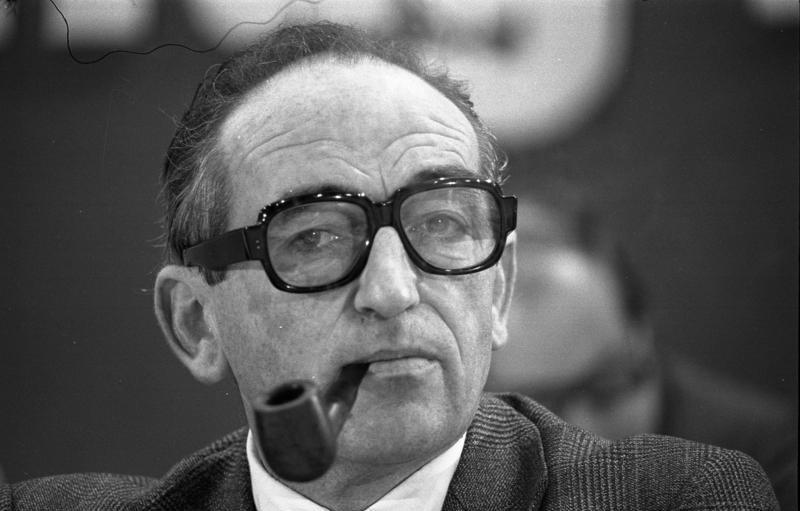
- Uwe Ronneburger, 1977
- Born: 23 November 1920; Kiel, Schleswig-Holstein, Germany
- Died: 1 October 2007 (aged 86); Tetenbüll, Schleswig-Holstein, Germany
- Occupation: Politician
- Political party: Free Democratic Party

Uwe Ronneburger (23 November 1920 – 1 October 2007) was a German politician from the Free Democratic Party.

He was from 1980 to 1983 Chairman of the Committee on Intra-German Relations, from May to December 1990 Chairman of the Defence Committee of the German Bundestag. From 1976 to 1982 he was also deputy national chairman of the FDP. He also was a member of the Landtag of Schleswig-Holstein between 1975 and 1980.
