= Thomas Jarzombek =

German politician

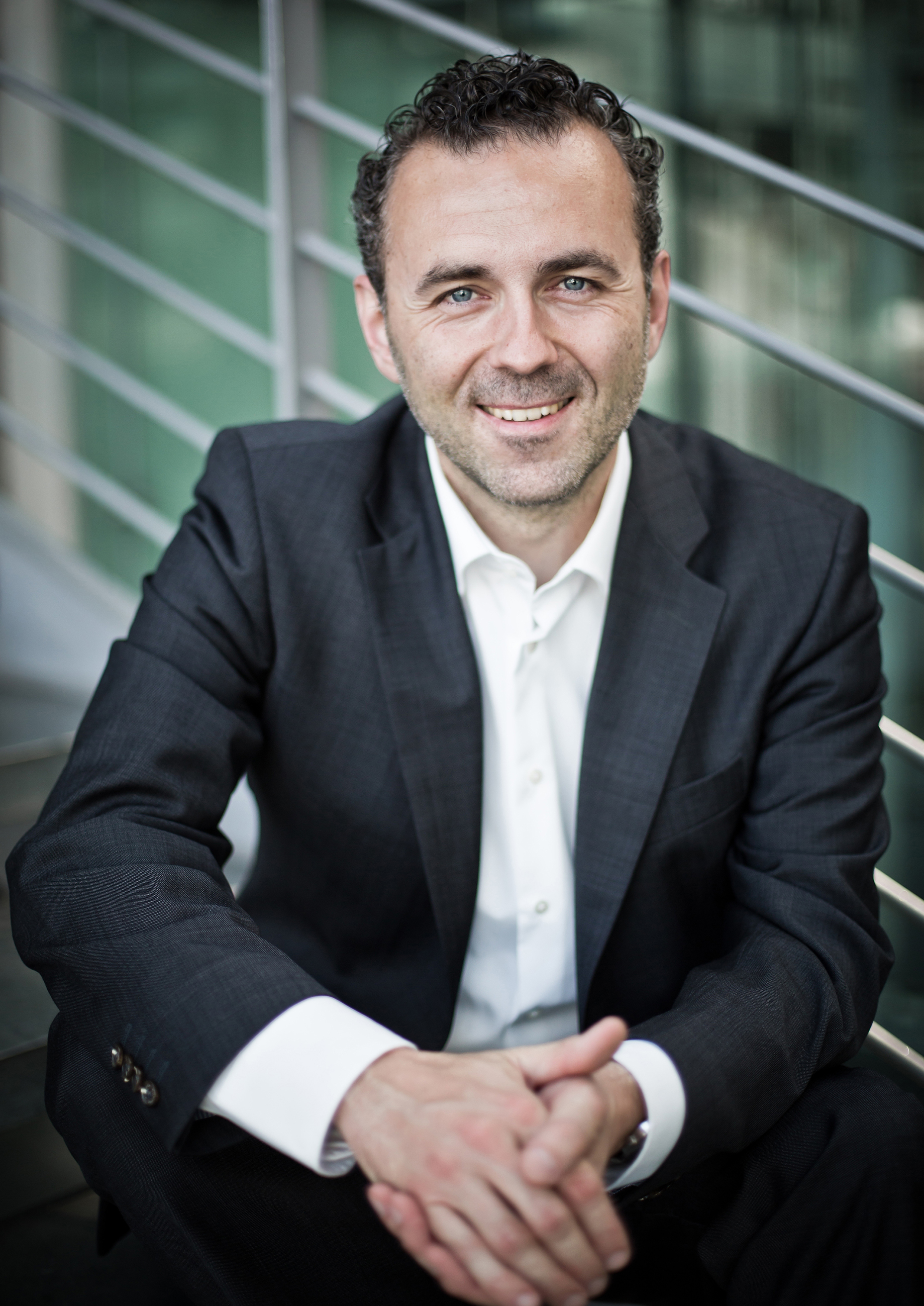
- Jarzombek in 2013

Member of the Bundestag
- Incumbent
- Assumed office 2009
- Preceded by: Thomas Mahlberg

Personal details
- Born: 28 April 1973 (age 53) Düsseldorf, West Germany (now Germany)
- Party: CDU
- Education: Heinrich Heine University Düsseldorf (attended)

Thomas Jarzombek (born 28 April 1973) is a German politician of the Christian Democratic Union (CDU) who has been serving as a member of the Bundestag from the state of North Rhine-Westphalia since 2009.

In addition to his work in parliament, Jarzombek has been serving as a Parliamentary State Secretary at the Federal Ministry for Digital and State Modernisation in the government of Chancellor Friedrich Merz since 2025.

== Early life and education ==
Jarzombek briefly studied business administration at the University of Düsseldorf but dropped out early to start his own IT service business in 1996.

== Political career ==
=== Career in state politics ===
From 2005 until 2009, Jarzombek served as a member of the State Parliament of North Rhine-Westphalia. During that time, he was his parliamentary group's spokesperson on media policy.

=== Member of the German Parliament, 2009–present ===
Jarzombek first became a member of the Bundestag in the 2009 German federal election. He has since been a member of the Committee on Transport and Digital Infrastructure. He has also served on the Committee on Family Affairs, Senior Citizens, Women and Youth (2009–2013) and the Committee on the Digital Agenda (2013–2017).

In the negotiations to form a coalition government under the leadership of Chancellor Angela Merkel following the 2017 federal elections, Jarzombek was part of the working group on digital policy, led Helge Braun, Dorothee Bär and Lars Klingbeil. From 2018 until 2021 he served as Commissioner for the Digital Industry and Start-ups and Federal Government Coordinator of German Aerospace Policy at the Federal Ministry for Economic Affairs and Energy.

In 2021, Jarzombek announced his candidacy to succeed Carsten Linnemann as chair of MIT, the pro-business wing in the CDU/CSU; he ultimately lost an internal vote against Gitta Connemann.

Since the 2021 elections, Jarzombek has been a member of the Committee on Education, Research and Technology Assessment and the Committee on Digitization.

In the negotiations to form a coalition government of the CDU and Green Party under Minister-President of North Rhine-Westphalia Hendrik Wüst following the 2022 state elections, Jarzombek led his party's delegation in the working group on education.

== Other activities ==
- Stiftung Lesen, Member of the Board of Trustees (since 2022)
- Patronage of the TechRiders Summit 2026 with a focus on Digital Sovereignty
- Fraunhofer Center for International Management and Knowledge Economy, Member of the Board of Trustees
- Quadriga Hochschule Berlin, Member of the advisory board on Politics and Public Affairs
- Federal Network Agency for Electricity, Gas, Telecommunications, Post and Railway (BNetzA), Member of the Advisory Board
- KfW Capital, Member of the advisory board (2018–2022)

== Political positions ==
In June 2017, Jarzombek voted against Germany's introduction of same-sex marriage.
