= Karl-Hermann Flach =

German journalist and politician (1929–1973)

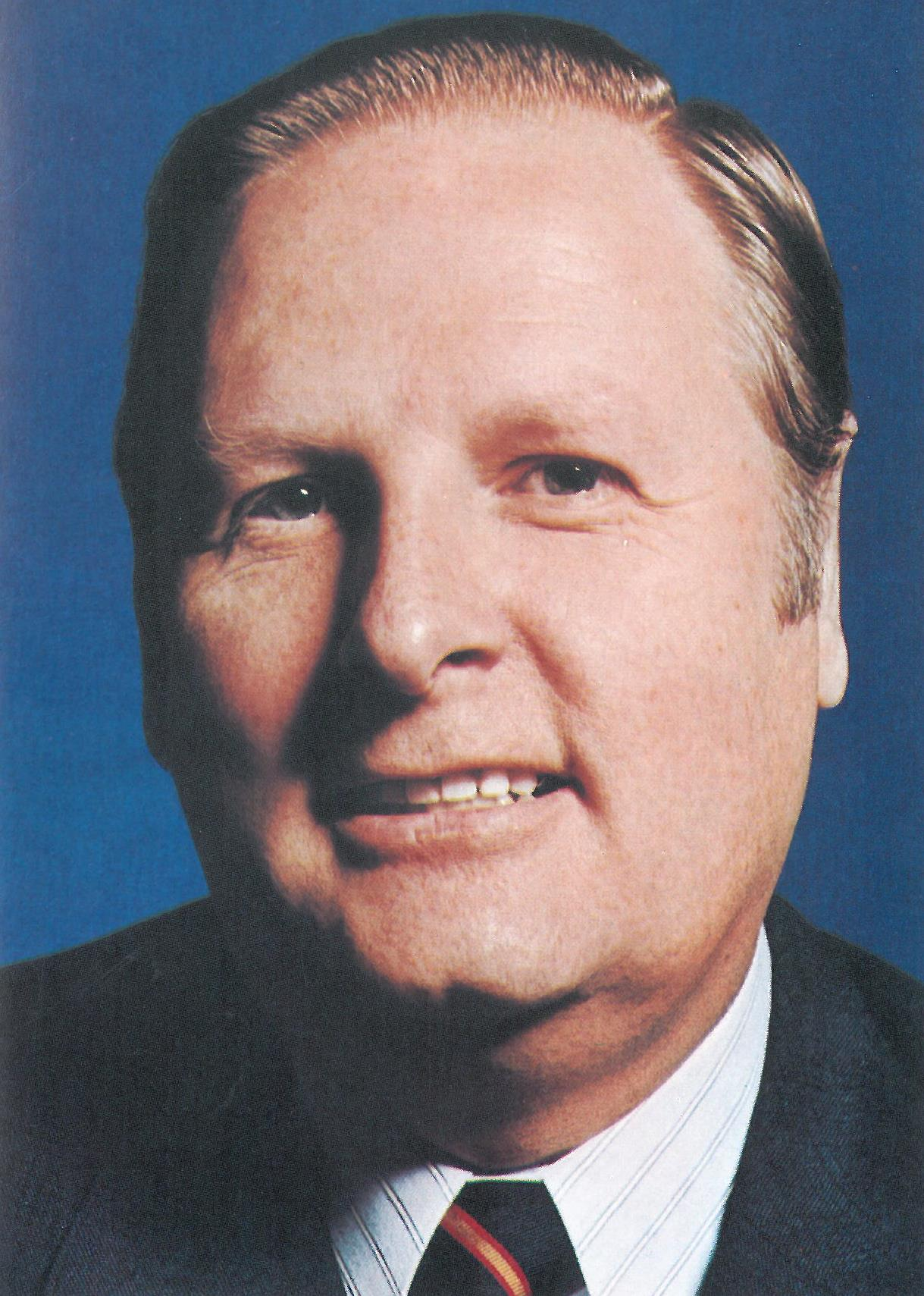
Flach, c. 1972

Karl-Hermann Flach (October 17, 1929 – August 25, 1973) was a German journalist of the Frankfurter Rundschau and a politician of the liberal Free Democrats (FDP).

Flach was born in Königsberg. He became a member of the liberal LDP (in the Soviet zone of Germany) and worked in 1948/1949 for the LDP newspaper Norddeutsche Zeitung in Schwerin. In October 1949 he fled to West Berlin and became a member of the FDP. In 1949–1953 he studied political science at the German School of Politics, which is now the Otto Suhr Institute.

In 1956 he started to work for the federal headquarters of the party and had important campaign jobs in 1957 and 1961. But in 1962 he left the party organisation for the Frankfurter Rundschau, a leading newspaper then considered liberal. From 1971 on he worked again for the FDP, this time as secretary-general of chairman Walter Scheel. Being elected to the Bundestag in 1972 he became vice chairman of the Bundestag party.

Flach died prematurely in Frankfurt, aged 43, in 1973 after having suffered a stroke a month before. He was succeeded in the Bundestag by Barbara Lüdemann.

Flach belonged to the left wing of his party and is considered an important contributor to social liberalism. He was one of the authors of the left liberal Freiburger Thesen, a programmatic paper the party accepted at its congress in October 1971. The stand for the turn to the left the party started in 1968 to become more independent from the conservatives and have a coalition with the social democrats (1969–1982).

He has been honoured with several prizes for his work as a journalist. Later came a foundation and a prize named after him.

== See also ==
- Contributions to liberal theory
