= Karl-Hans Laermann =

German politician (1929–2024)

Minister of Education and Research
- In office 4 February 1994 – 15 November 1994
- Preceded by: Rainer Ortleb
- Succeeded by: Jürgen Rüttgers

Member of the Bundestag
- In office 28 June 1974 – 26 October 1998

Personal details
- Born: 26 December 1929 Venrath, Erkelenz, Rhine Province, Prussia, Germany
- Died: 26 June 2024 (aged 94)
- Party: FDP
- Education: RWTH Aachen University
- Occupation: Academic

Karl-Hans Laermann (26 December 1929 – 26 June 2024) was a German politician. A member of the Free Democratic Party, he served in the Bundestag from 1974 to 1998 and was Minister of Education and Research from February to November 1994.

Laermann died on 26 June 2024, at the age of 94.
