= Rolf Böger =

German politician

Member of the Bundestag
- In office 25 January 1973 – 13 December 1976

Personal details
- Born: 9 August 1908 Strasburg / Westpreußen
- Died: 17 January 1995 (aged 86)
- Party: FDP

Rolf Böger (9 August 1908 – 17 January 1995) was a German politician of the Free Democratic Party (FDP) and former member of the German Bundestag.

== Life ==
Via the state list of North Rhine-Westphalia, he entered the 7th German Bundestag on 25 January 1973 as Rudolf Augstein's successor.

== Literature ==
Herbst, Ludolf; Jahn, Bruno (2002). Vierhaus, Rudolf (ed.). Biographisches Handbuch der Mitglieder des Deutschen Bundestages. 1949–2002 [Biographical Handbook of the Members of the German Bundestag. 1949–2002] (in German). München: De Gruyter - De Gruyter Saur. p. 1715. ISBN 978-3-11-184511-1.
