= Gottfried Arnold (politician) =

German politician

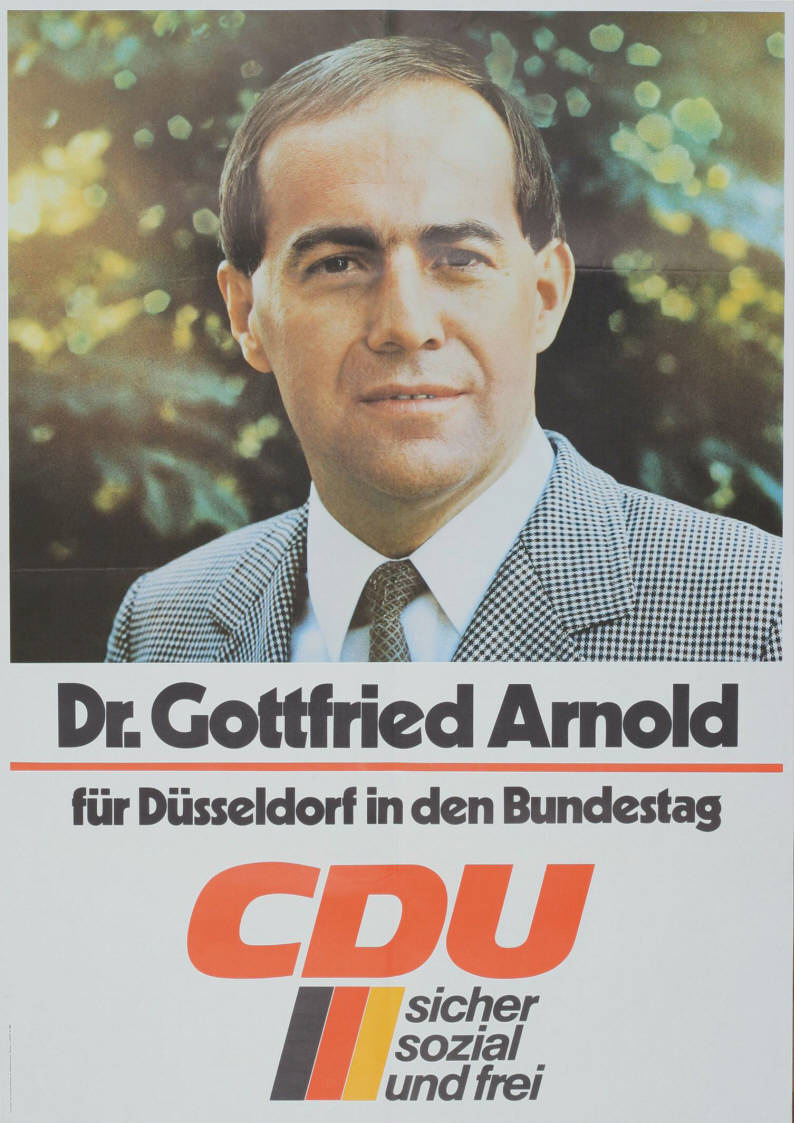
- Gottfried Arnold on a CDU poster for the 1980 federal elections

Member of the Bundestag
- In office 17 October 1961 – 29 March 1983

Personal details
- Born: 10 February 1933 Düsseldorf
- Died: 28 December 2015 (aged 82)
- Party: CDU
- Occupation: Lawyer

Gottfried Arnold (10 February 1933 – 28 December 2015) was a German politician of the Christian Democratic Union (CDU) and former member of the German Bundestag.

== Life ==
Arnold was a member of the CDU and from 1970 to 1981 chairman of the Düsseldorf CDU district association. Gottfried Arnold was a member of the German Bundestag from 1961 to 1983. In parliament he represented the constituency of Düsseldorf.

== Literature ==
Herbst, Ludolf; Jahn, Bruno (2002). Vierhaus, Rudolf (ed.). Biographisches Handbuch der Mitglieder des Deutschen Bundestages. 1949–2002 [Biographical Handbook of the Members of the German Bundestag. 1949–2002] (in German). München: De Gruyter - De Gruyter Saur. p. 1715. ISBN 978-3-11-184511-1.
