= Harald Schneider (politician) =

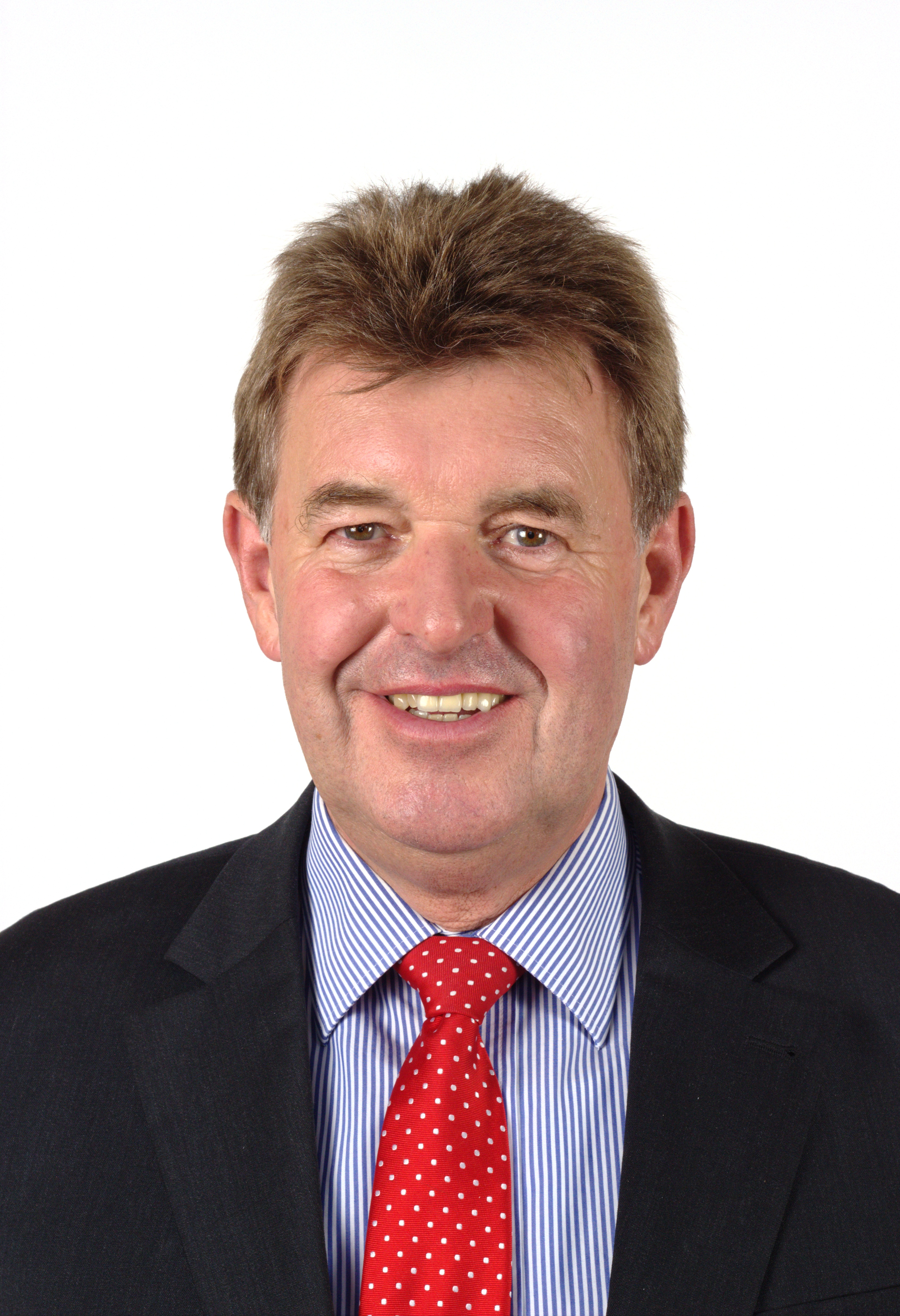
- Harald-Schneider in 2012

Member of the Landtag of Bavaria
- In office 2008–2013

Personal details
- Born: 3 May 1952 (age 74) Würzburg, West Germany
- Party: Social Democratic Party of Germany
- Spouse: Heidemarie Wright

Harald Schneider (born 3 May 1952 in Würzburg) is a German trade union official and politician from the Social Democratic Party of Germany (SPD). He was the state chairman of the German Police Union (GdP) in Bavaria from 2005 to 2010 and a member of the Landtag of Bavaria from 2008 to 2013.

== Life and career ==
Schneider initially attended secondary school and in 1962 transferred to the Alexander von Humboldt Gymnasium in Schweinfurt, where he completed his secondary education in 1969. From 1969 to 1972, he completed police training in Würzburg, Munich, and Dachau. He served in the police force until 1985 at stations in Aschaffenburg, Würzburg, and Karlstadt, most recently as an investigator, and became involved in the police union GdP in 1972. Schneider was promoted to Chief Inspector of Police ; he served as chairman of the staff council and district staff council in Würzburg until 2008 and was a member of the central staff council at the Bavarian State Ministry of the Interior from 1986 to 2008.

== Political career ==
Schneider has been a member of the SPD Bavaria since 1979 and was elected chairman of the party in the Main-Spessart district in 2000. He has been a city councilor in Karlstadt since 1984, a district councillor in the Main-Spessart district since 1988, and was deputy district administrator of the district from 1996 to 2020. From 1994 to 2003, he was a district councilor of the Lower Franconia district assembly.

In the 2008 Bavarian state election, Schneider was elected to the Landtag of Bavaria via the SPD list in Lower Franconia, where he served until 2013. From 2008 to 2013, he was a member of the Committee on Local Government Affairs and Internal Security and simultaneously the security policy spokesperson for the SPD parliamentary group. He was also a member of the Committee on the Environment and Health from 2009 to 2011. In 2012, he was a member of the 15th Federal Convention for the election of the Federal President.

== Social Functions ==
From 1979, Schneider was deputy state and federal youth chairman of the German Police Union (GdP), from 1986 chairman of the staff council of the Lower Franconian police, and co-founder of the sponsoring association for open children's and youth work in Karlstadt (Troja). From 1985 to 2008, he was chairman of the GdP district of Lower Franconia, from 1993 to 2005 deputy state chairman and from 2005 to November 2010 state chairman of the GdP in Bavaria. He was a member of the GdP federal executive board from 1994 to 2010. In 2010, he was appointed honorary chairman of the state trade union association. Since 2012, Schneider has been a board member of the AWO district association of Lower Franconia.

== Awards ==
- 2014: Bayerische Verfassungsmedaille in Silver
- 2019: Local Medal of Merit of Merit in Bronze

== Personal life ==
Schneider is married to former Member of the Bundestag Heidemarie Wright and has three children and five grandchildren.

== See also ==
- List of Social Democratic Party of Germany members
