= Heidemarie Wright =

Member of the Bundestag
- In office 1994–2009

Personal details
- Born: Heidemarie Englert; 20 February 1951 (age 75) Heimbuchenthal, West Germany
- Party: Social Democratic Party of Germany

Heidemarie "Heidi" Wright (née Englert; born 20 February 1951) is a German politician from the Social Democratic Party of Germany (SPD).

== Early life and career ==
Heidemarie Englert was born in Heimbuchenthal, Bavaria. After attending elementary school, Heidemarie Wright completed an apprenticeship as a legal assistant and subsequently worked in law firms in Aschaffenburg and Hanau. After an eight-year break to raise her family, she worked as an administrative employee for the police.

Heidemarie Wright has been married to Harald Schneider since 2006 and has two daughters from her first marriage. She also has two step-sons from her ex-husband's first marriage.

== Party politics ==
She joined the SPD Bavaria in 1983 and served on the board of the Miltenberg SPD district association from 1984 to 2007. Heidemarie Wright also served as deputy chair of the SPD sub-district from 1986 to 2010 and has been a member of the SPD district board in Lower Franconia continuously since 1991.

== Elected office ==
Heidemarie Wright was a member of the Elsenfeld municipal council until December 2006 and also served on the Miltenberg district council from 1996 to July 2007. Since 2008, she has held a seat on the Main-Spessart district council.

From 1994 to 2009, she was a member of the German Bundestag. From 1998 to 2002, she served as deputy spokesperson for the SPD Fraktion's working group on petitions and for the working group on consumer protection, food, and agriculture. She was a member of the Bundestag's Committee on Transport, Building and Urban Development, where she was rapporteur for cycling and road safety. Wright did not run for re-election to the 17th Bundestag in the 2009 German federal election.

Heidemarie Wright was always elected to the Bundestag via the second vote on the Bavarian state list. Her constituency is Main-Spessart.

== Public Offices ==
In November 2004, she was elected Deputy Federal Chairwoman of the Allgemeiner Deutscher Fahrrad-Club (ADFC). She did not run for re-election in November 2010.

== Honours ==
- 2013: Order of Merit of the Federal Republic of Germany
