= Municipal council (Germany) =

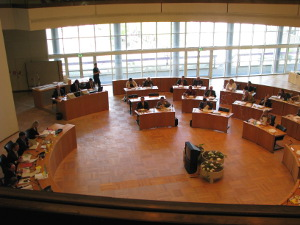
City council meeting in Mannheim

The municipal council (German: Gemeinderat) is the main body of a municipality. The council is the representative body of the municipal citizens and is elected for four, five or six years, depending on the state municipal constitution. Every municipal council in Germany has a mayor (Bürgermeister).

== Designations ==
The term varies across German states and even within states depending on the size and status of the municipality. Specifically, the following terms are used – which vary considerably depending on the specifics of municipal constitutional law :

- Municipal council / city council (in most countries)
- Municipal council (in Brandenburg, Hesse, Mecklenburg-Western Pomerania, Schleswig-Holstein)
- Market town council (in market towns)
- Local council (in local municipalities belonging to the association in Rhineland-Palatinate)
- Council (in Lower Saxony)
- City citizenship (in the city of Bremen)
- City Council (City of Bremerhaven and in Hesse, partly in North Rhine-Westphalia, Schleswig-Holstein and Brandenburg)
- City council (in cities in Mecklenburg-Western Pomerania and Schleswig-Holstein)
- Citizenship (Free and Hanseatic City of Hamburg, where it also serves as the state parliament, as well as Hanseatic cities in Schleswig-Holstein and Mecklenburg-Western Pomerania, but not in the state of Bremen, which is formed from two municipalities and where Citizenship refers solely to the state parliament)
- In the state of Berlin, which is also a unitary municipality, the Abgeordnetenhaus of Berlin is both the state parliament and the municipal representative body.

Designations in the federal states
country	Community	City
Baden-Württemberg	Municipal Council	Municipal Council
Bavaria	Municipal council or market council	City Council
Brandenburg	municipal council	City Council
Hesse	municipal council	City Council
Mecklenburg-Western Pomerania	municipal council	City council (in the Hanseatic cities: citizenship)
Lower Saxony	Council	Council
North Rhine-Westphalia	Municipal Council	City Council
Rhineland-Palatinate	Local council/municipal council	City Council
Saarland	Municipal Council	City Council
Saxony	Municipal Council	City Council
Saxony-Anhalt	Municipal Council	City Council
Schleswig-Holstein	Municipal council or municipal assembly	City council or citizenship (Hanseatic City of Lübeck) or city council (Bad Oldesloe)
Thuringia	Municipal Council	City Council

The members of these bodies are also often called "Gemeinderat" or "Stadtrat" (municipal councillor) (e.g., City Councillor Alois Müller). However, in countries with a magistrate constitution, "Stadtrat" is the name given to an alderman who is a member of the magistrate. The members of the City Council, on the other hand, are called " Stadtrat" (city councillor).City councilors. In Bavaria, the legal designation is "municipal council member" or "city council member," in contrast to the members of the district council and the district council (both also municipal bodies), who are called "district councilors" and "district councilors," respectively.

Depending on the country, the chairman of the city council is either the mayor or lord mayor elected by the people or a chairman elected from the body itself, who may also have a special title, e.g. city president, city council chairman, council chairman, president of the citizenry, mayor (Bürgervorsteher) or citizen spokesman (Bürgerworthalter).

In parishes and student communities there is also a parish council, which is usually called the Pastoral council, parish council or presbytery (see parish leadership).

== Assignment to the executive branch ==
Despite the superficial similarity to a parliament, the municipal council is not part of the legislative branch, but rather of the executive branch. The representations in the city-states of Berlin and Hamburg are an exception to this. In the Free Hanseatic City of Bremen, the Bürgerschaft of the state of Bremen (legislative branch) is distinct from the municipal citizenship of the city municipality of Bremen (executive branch).

This is because in Germany laws can only be passed by the state (i.e. the federal or state governments). Municipalities, as territorial entities, belong to the state in the broader sense, but not to the state in the narrower sense. Laws are indeed made in local councils, but only in the form of statutes and ordinances, i.e. legal norms that rank below formal laws in the hierarchy of norms. Since the local council, despite its parliamentary nature and corresponding public perception, cannot pass laws in the formal sense, it is considered an executive and not a legislative body under constitutional law. Furthermore, the norm-setting activities of the local council only represent a small part of its overall activities. Municipal regulations also do not define the local council as the exclusive or primarily legislative body, but rather as the central governing body of the municipality, with its main focus on executive functions. Just like the judiciary, legislative bodies can only exist at the state, i.e., state and federal, levels.

== Status and tasks ==
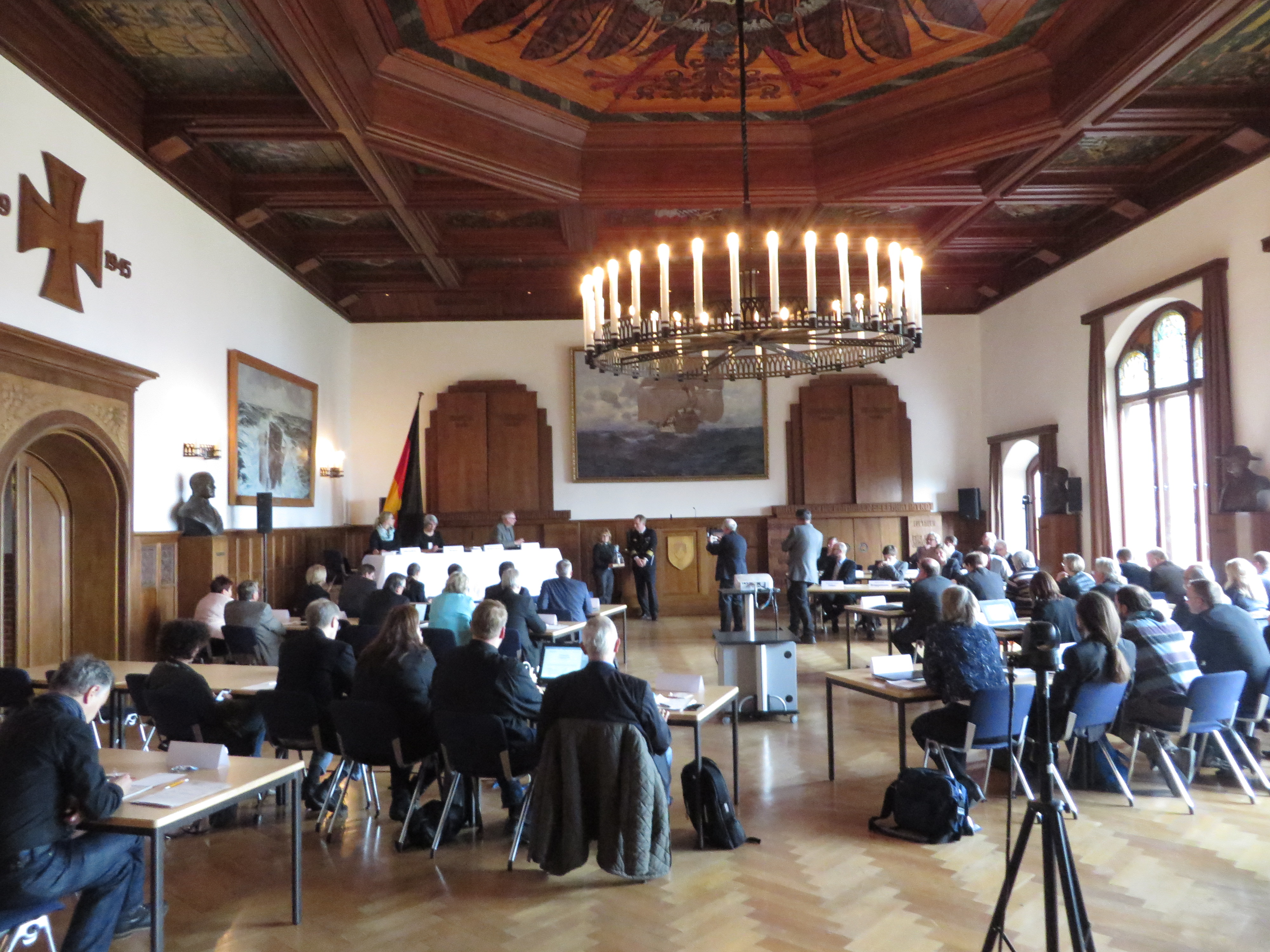
The Flensburg Town Hall council meeting takes place once a year at the Mürwik Naval School. (Photo 2015)

The municipal council is a municipal body and the political representative of the municipal citizens. The municipal council is not an authority in the institutional sense, as it carries out administrative activities under public law (body of a legal entity under public law), but without the external influence that is constitutive of an authority. It decides on the administrative organization of the municipality insofar as matters of the local community (own sphere of influence) or matters that the law assigns to the municipalities for handling on behalf of the state (transferred sphere of influence/commissioned matters) are affected (universal jurisdiction of the municipality) and the mayor ( called Lord Mayor in independent cities and large district towns) is not responsible (organ jurisdiction of the municipal council). The municipal council decides on all matters within the scope of the municipality that are not assigned to other municipal bodies with their own jurisdiction.

The municipal council is not responsible for matters that have been delegated to the mayor, municipal senate , or municipal council committee for independent handling. This includes regular business that arises on an ongoing basis and is not of fundamental importance or entails any significant obligations for the municipality. In accordance with the municipal regulations, the municipal council can also generally delegate certain business to the aforementioned municipal bodies; in such cases, it is no longer responsible for them in individual cases. The municipal council supervises the mayor and the municipal administration, in particular the implementation of its resolutions. The mayor is responsible for the administrative supervision of municipal employees; the municipal council determines the nature and extent of this authority in its rules of procedure. The mayor implements the resolutions of the municipal council. The resolutions become effective externally when they are implemented by the (lord) mayor. The resolutions are not administrative acts , but represent an internal decision-making process; they become administrative acts when they are implemented by the mayor. An exception to this are resolutions that do not require an implementation act.

== Composition ==
=== Election ===
The municipal council is elected by the citizens in elections in accordance with the provisions of the respective local electoral law, with participation from political parties and electoral associations. Within the European Union, EU citizens also have the right to vote and stand for election. Candidates for local elections must be nominated by secret ballot.

=== Structure ===
The municipal council/city council consists of the chairman, who in many federal states is the mayor (or lord mayor), and the elected council members.

The size of the municipal council/city council is determined by the respective municipal ordinances and depends largely on the municipality's population. It varies from 6 to over 90 members.

The voluntary members of the municipal council receive an expense allowance.

=== Special feature in Bavaria ===
In larger municipalities, the municipal council can elect additional professional council members. These are temporary municipal elected officials. They have no voting rights on the municipal council, but only perform an advisory function. Professional council members often have titles such as "advisor" or "councilor" (e.g., district administration officer, environmental officer, city planning officer, city school board member, etc.). The remuneration of professional council members is determined by state law or statutory regulations.

In Bavaria, the number of honorary municipal council members and the allocation of the offices of professional municipal council members (temporary elected municipal officials) to the respective salary groups (salary groups according to the Federal Salary Act) are as follows:

Volunteer council members		Professional municipal council members			
Volunteer council members		District municipalities		Independent cities and large district towns	
Residents	Members	Resident	Salary	Resident	Salary
up to 1,000	8	–	–	up to 30,000	A14/A15
1,001 to 2,000	12	–	–	up to 30,000	A14/A15
2,001 to 3,000	14	–	–	up to 30,000	A14/A15
3,001 to 5,000	16	–	–	up to 30,000	A14/A15
5,001 to 10,000	20	–	–	up to 30,000	A14/A15
10,001 to 15,000	24	10,001 to 15,000	A13/A14	up to 30,000	A14/A15
15,001 to 20,000	24	15,001 to 30,000	A14/A15	up to 30,000	A14/A15
20,001 to 30,000	30	15,001 to 30,000	A14/A15	up to 30,000	A14/A15
30,001 to 50,000	40	more than 30,000	A 14/A 15	30,001 to 50,000	A 16/B 2
50,001 to 100,000	44	more than 30,000	A 14/A 15	50,001 to 100,000	B 2/B 3
100,001 to 200,000	50	more than 30,000	A 14/A 15	100,001 to 200,000	B 3/B 4
Augsburg	60	more than 30,000	A 14/A 15	Augsburg	B 4/B 5
Nürnberg	70			Nürnberg	B 5/B 6
München	80			München	B 6/B 7

=== Regulation in Saxony ===
The composition of Saxon city and municipal councils is stipulated in Section 29 of the Saxon Municipal Code and is generally based on the table below. However, the main statute of the respective municipality may stipulate that the composition is based on the next higher or next lower size group. In the last size group, the number may increase by a maximum of 10 councilors. The mayor is the chairman of the council with voting rights.

Size chart (including district towns and independent cities)
Residents	Municipal councils	Residents	Municipal councils
up to 500	8	up to 30.000 (Meißen)	26
up to 1,000	10	up to 40.000 (Pirna, Bautzen)	30
up to 2,000	12	up to 50.000 (Freiberg)	34
up to 3,000	14	up to 60.000 (Görlitz)	38
up to 5,000	16	up to 80.000 (Plauen)	42
up to 10,000	18	up to 150.000 (Zwickau)	48
up to 20,000	22 (Torgau, Borna,Annaberg-Buchholz)	up to 400.000 (Chemnitz)	54
up to 20,000	22 (Torgau, Borna,Annaberg-Buchholz)	from 400.000 (Dresden, Leipzig)	60

Dresden, Leipzig, and Chemnitz all make use of the above-mentioned regulation and have 70 and 60 city councilors, respectively. The district town of Annaberg-Buchholz also has 26 councilors, four more than planned. Pirna, however, has four fewer councilors than its original size class, namely 26. The same applies to Torgau, which has only 20 councilors. But even Rathen, for example, the municipality with the smallest population in Saxony (347 residents), makes use of the exemption and has 10 councilors.

== Course of business ==
The municipal council makes decisions in meetings (mandatory meetings). Decisions by circular or by soliciting votes in person or by telephone are inadmissible. The reason for the mandatory meeting is the need for joint deliberation, which is an important prerequisite for the accurate formation of the will.

=== Proper summons of all council members ===
All members of the municipal council must be duly summoned. The chairperson convenes the municipal council, stating the agenda and providing reasonable notice. The municipal council's rules of procedure contain provisions regarding the form and notice period for summons. A meeting may also be convened upon request by a portion of the municipal council's members, as further defined in the state municipal code, stating the subject matter to be discussed. If a municipal council member is not summoned, the resolution is invalid unless the council member appears despite the lack of a summons and does not object to the lack of a summons (implied waiver of summons). A lack of summons is not irrelevant simply because their vote had no effect on the municipal council's resolution. Under certain circumstances, the council member could have still changed the consensus during the deliberations by presenting convincing arguments.

=== Majority present and voting ===
For a Quorum to be present, a majority of its members (excluding professional council members) must be present and entitled to vote. The majority is based on the actual strength of the municipal council. Members who have left the council due to relocation, resignation, or death, or members who were excluded from a meeting due to sessional police measures, are not included in the calculation of the majority. Council members who cannot participate in the deliberations and voting due to personal involvement in the matter being discussed or decided upon are taken into account. Under certain circumstances, the presence of a majority of the municipal council members may be waived (e.g., a second discussion on the same matter). Municipal council members are obliged to attend meetings, to carry out the business assigned to them by the first mayor (lord mayor) according to the rules of procedure, and to cast their votes. If a municipal council member abstains from voting in violation of the regulations or fails to attend meetings in violation of the regulations, the municipal council's resolution remains valid; the only option is to impose a fine.

=== Resolution and its form ===
Decisions are generally made by majority vote in public meetings ( unless the public good or the legitimate interests of individuals conflict). Minutes of the council's deliberations must be kept.

=== Preliminary and decision-making committees or municipal senates ===
The municipal council can appoint preparatory committees to facilitate its tasks. For the purpose of division of labor, it also has the option of transferring its authority in certain matters or branches of business to municipal senates ( or decision-making committees). The municipal senates act within their area of responsibility in place of the municipal council. However, the first mayor (lord mayor), his deputy, or a certain number of members of the municipal council can usually request a review by the municipal council. Certain matters are excluded from transfer to a municipal senate. These usually include, somewhat differently depending on the municipal code: statutes (excluding urban development planning ) and ordinances; budget statutes and financial plans; matters requiring approval by the legal supervisory authority, etc. The composition of the senates is determined in the rules of procedure according to the relative strengths of the parties and voting groups in the municipal council. An important municipal senate in practice is the building senate, which advises on and decides on urban development planning (land use plans and development plans) only in large cities.

Committees and parliamentary groups are “auxiliary bodies” of the city council.

The municipal council may appoint so-called knowledgeable citizens or knowledgeable residents to a committee without voting rights, although their number may not exceed the number of regular council members. In practice, this happens upon proposals from the parliamentary groups or the administration. This regulation must first be introduced through the municipal code. In Berlin, such individuals can also exercise voting rights. They are called citizen deputies there. "Knowledgeable residents" in Mecklenburg-Western Pomerania and "citizen committee members" in Schleswig-Holstein also have voting rights in these committees.

== Bias ==
If a decision to be taken entails “a direct advantage or disadvantage” for a council member or a member of a defined group of people related to him, a conflict of interest is presumed, which must be avoided in the interest of the common good: The council member is deemed to be biased and must leave the meeting, the necessary individual decision is made by the relevant committee.

== See also ==
- Stadtrat
- Municipal council (France)
- Municipal Council (Austria)
- Municipal Council (Switzerland)
- District council (Germany) or local council (Ortsbeirat) (local advisory council, district council, local committee)

== Literature ==
- Harald Hofmann, Rolf-Dieter Theisen: Kommunalrecht in NRW. 13., vollständig überarbeitete Auflage. Bernhardt-Witten, Witten 2008, ISBN 978-3-933870-80-3
- Yvonne Ott: Der Parlamentscharakter der Gemeindevertretung: eine rechtsvergleichende Untersuchung der Qualität staatlicher und gemeindlicher Vertretungskörperschaften. Nomos, Baden-Baden 1994, ISBN 978-3-7890-3411-4
