= Stadtrat =

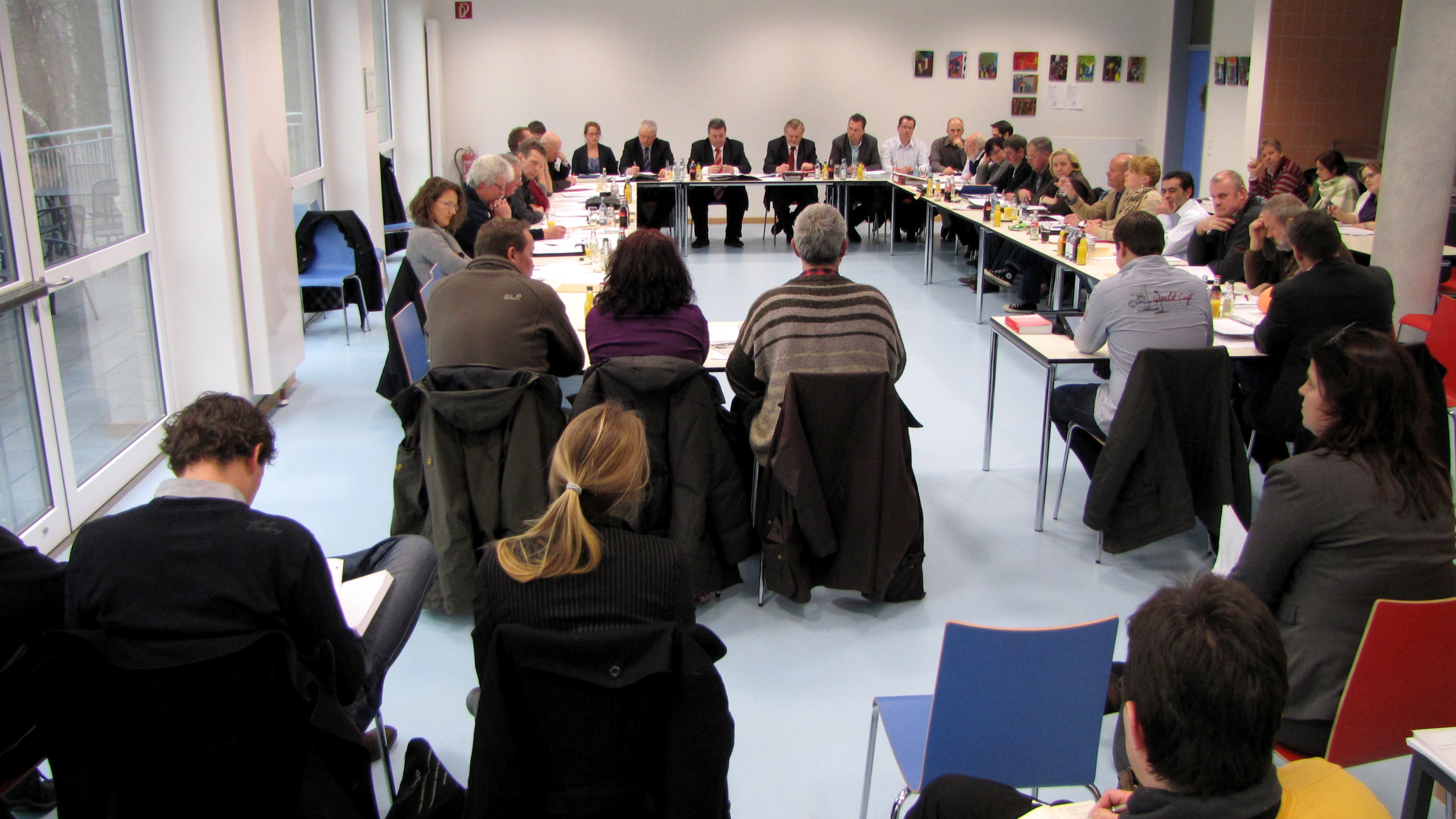
Meeting of the Isselburg City Council, North Rhine-Westphalia, 2011

In the Germanosphere, a Stadtrat (city council) is a collegial body appointed to represent or administer a city, or a member of such a body. Similar terms are used in Italy, the Netherlands, Belgium, France, Spain, Sweden, and other democratic countries. In some German states, Stadtrat also refers to a department head within a city administration.

In Austria, Stadtrat refers to a city government or a member of Municipal Council. In statutory cities (e.g., Vienna), the Stadtrat is called the Stadtsenat (city senate) as a collegial body .

In Switzerland, depending on the canton, Stadtrat refers either to the legislative (law-making) municipal authority, i.e., the municipal parliament, or, more frequently, to the executive (implementing) authority, i.e., the city government.

In Germany, Austria, and Italy, the city council, as an executive body, never has legislative power. In the city-states of Hamburg (Bürgerschaft), Berlin (Abgeordnetenhaus of Berlin), and Vienna (Landtag), this function rests with the respective national parliament or the city-state parliament, to which the city council can introduce draft legislation. In Italy, the legislative function lies with the national parliament, the regional councils, and the provincial parliaments of Trentino and South Tyrol.

== Germany ==
In many German states, Stadtrat (city council) is the name given to the local council, i.e., the municipal representative body in cities (in other municipalities: Gemeinderat [municipal council]). The members of the city council are also sometimes referred to as city councilors and are involved in committees. Within the framework of municipal legislative authority, the city council is the most important body of local self-government. The first female city councilors in Germany were elected in October 1919 in Königsberg (Prussia) (Charlotte Melzer née Linde (1890–1971), Martha Harpf (1874–1942), and Emma Rohrer.) and in Kassel (Johanna Vogt (1862–1944).

In a few states (e.g., Hessen), "Stadtrat" (city council) refers to the members of a city's executive board. City councilors generally and predominantly have the status of honorary officials. The municipality's bylaws may stipulate that a city councilor serves as a full-time elected official. The mayor, acting as department head, assigns them, as department heads, responsibility for specific parts of the city administration. Department heads may also hold titles such as city building director (head of construction) or city treasurer (head of finance). The mayor's deputy holds the title "First City Councilor." In the states where the term "Stadtrat" is used in this way, the municipal council is not called "Stadtrat" but rather "Stadtverordnetenversammlung " (city assembly), "Stadtvertretung" (city council), or "Rat der Stadt" (city council). The members are accordingly called "Stadtverordnete" (city councilors), "Ratsmitglieder" (council members), or "Stadtvertreter" (city representatives).

In Bavaria, the term "professional city council member" is used for department heads to avoid confusion with volunteer city council members elected by the citizens.

In Baden-Württemberg members of the municipal council in cities are called city councilors.

In the capital of the GDR, and after German reunification until the election of a unified Berlin Senate following the elections of 2 December 1990, the members of the East Berlin city government (Magistrat) were called city councilors ("The Lord Mayor and the City Councilors"). The new East Berlin state constitution of 1990 then elevated them to the rank of state ministers. The Senate Law (in a slightly modified version of the West Berlin Senate Law) applied to them. According to the Unification Treaty between the Federal Republic of Germany and the GDR, from the reunification of Germany until the formation of a unified Berlin state government, Berlin was governed jointly by the Senate and the Magistrat All draft resolutions, regardless of whether they applied to the eastern or western part of the city, bore the signatures of both the western and eastern senators. The salary grade for all senators and city councilors in the state government was B11. In contrast to the state level, the department heads in the districts of Berlin (municipal level) are called district councilors; they are elected municipal officials paid according to salary grade B4. The executive branch is the district assembly, whose members are called district representatives.

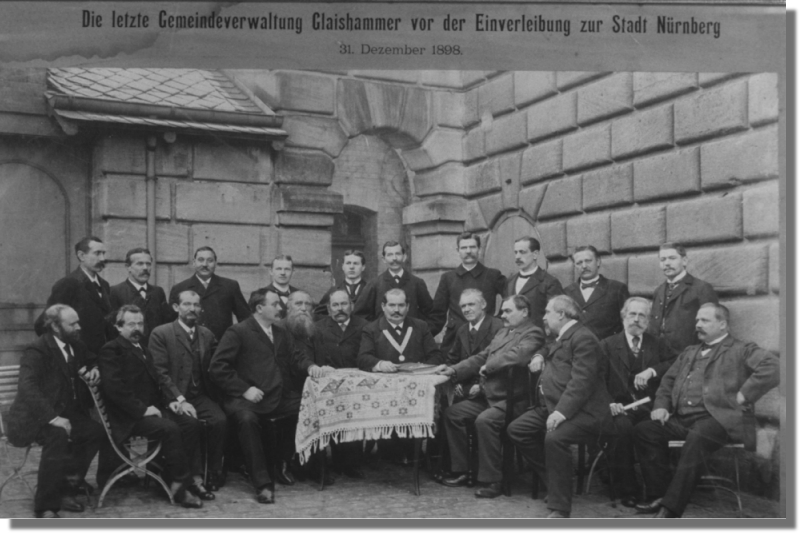
Municipal Council of Nuremberg - Gleißhammer in 1898

== Austria ==
In Austria the term Stadtrat "city council" refers to the collegial body (the body consisting of several persons) that, according to Section 117 Paragraph 1 Letter b of the Federal Constitutional Law of 1920, functions as the executive board of a city; the individual member of the body is also referred to as a city councilor. Statutory cities (cities with their own statutes) also function as district administrative authorities . In these cities, the collegial body is called the "city senate" according to this constitutional provision; its members are also city councilors. The different powers of the city councilors or city senates in municipal administration arise from the detailed regulations contained in the respective state municipal codes and city statutes.

The city council or city senate is elected by the municipal council from among its members. Like the municipal council, the city council or city senate has only executive, not legislative, powers.

Depending on the city's statutes, the allocation of city council positions may be mandated according to proportional representation, in which case members of the opposition can also serve on the council. However, these members are usually also assigned a portfolio, making constructive cooperation in city politics essential. Only in Vienna, due to the large number of councilors (between nine and fifteen), are there not only executive councilors but also non-executive councilors or councilors without portfolios . These latter councilors, in addition to their work on the council, are not actually responsible for managing specific departments within the city administration. Since these positions are filled by a majority vote in the city council, the opposition councilors remain without a portfolio and therefore not executive. While they are represented in city council meetings and receive the same infrastructure and salary as executive councilors, cooperation with them is not required. Lacking portfolio responsibility, they also cannot be removed from office by a Motion of no confidence. In Vienna, the city councilors are simultaneously members of the Vienna state government due to the city's dual function as both city and state.

From the mid-19th century until 31 May 1920, Vienna had a 30-member City Council, chaired by the Mayor, which served as the executive committee of the Vienna City Council. During the founding phase of the Republic, City Councillor Weiskirchner (1918/1919) and City Councillor Reumann (1919/1920) served on this council.

== Switzerland ==
Executive – In Zurich and many other cities in German-speaking Switzerland, the city council is the executive branch, while the legislative branch is usually called the municipal council.

Legislative – In Bern and the other cities of the canton of Bern, it is exactly the opposite: The parliament is called the city council, while the government is called the municipal council in all municipalities, regardless of their size .

Some cities (e.g. Lucerne, Schaffhausen) distinguish between the city council (unofficially also called the "small city council") as the executive branch and the large city council as the municipal parliament (legislative branch).

== South Tyrol (Italy) ==
In South Tyrol, both the city governments and their individual members are referred to as city councilors in urban municipalities. In rural municipalities, however, the governing body is called the municipal committee; its members are optionally referred to as municipal representatives or (analogous to the Italian form) municipal assessors.

== See also ==
- Gemeindeordnung
- Municipal council (Germany)
- District council (Germany)
- Jugendgemeinderat
