= Große Kreisstadt =

City classification in Germany

Administrative divisions of Germany (clickable image)

Große Kreisstadt (German: [ˈɡʁoːsə ˈkʁaɪsˌʃtat], "major district town") is a term in the municipal law (Gemeindeordnung) of several German states. In some federal states the term is used as a special legal status for a district-affiliated town—as distinct from an independent city—with additional competences in comparison with other municipalities of the district. The title is based on sovereign conferment by the state government.

== Administration rules ==
The term is officially used and quoted. In different German federal states (Bundesländer) there are different laws and administration rules about when exactly a town can obtain this status but they do not differ very much. The mayor of a Große Kreisstadt usually bears the title of an Oberbürgermeister (Lord Mayor).

At the moment reforms are being discussed in some states. It is not a main goal of these reforms to make the rules more similar; on the contrary, the district towns are thought to be important in order to preserve the existing regional diversity. In Germany federal states have very similar administration rules, so they are not always comparable to U.S. states for example.

== Große Kreisstädte in Baden-Württemberg, Bavaria and Saxony ==
District-affiliated municipalities may apply for the status of a Große Kreisstadt, conferred by decree of the state's interior ministry. Assuming certain sovereign functions of the district, the municipal authorities have to ensure they are able to carry out the assigned responsibilities. In the state of Baden-Württemberg, the necessary population to obtain this status is 20,000. In Bavaria 30,000 inhabitants are necessary; in Saxony, the minimum population is 17,500 (until 2008: 20,000). Usually, the motion is accepted.

The status of a Große Kreisstadt was first implemented by the Baden-Württemberg Gemeindeordnung on 1 April 1956, followed by Bavaria, where in the course of a 1972 administrative reform, the status was conferred to 23 former independent cities regardless of the population. The smallest Große Kreisstadt is Rothenburg ob der Tauber with about 10,900 inhabitants. Further conferments require a quorum of 30,000, however, in 1998 the historic imperial cities of Dinkelsbühl and Donauwörth were elevated by Bavarian state law, though they did not reach the necessary number of inhabitants. Currently, there are 93 Große Kreisstädte in Baden-Württemberg, 29 in Bavaria, and 50 in Saxony.

== Comparable towns in other states ==
In some German states other terms are used, for example Große selbständige Stadt in Lower Saxony, conclusively assigned by law to the towns of Celle, Cuxhaven, Goslar, Hameln, Hildesheim, Lingen and Lüneburg in the course of the 1970s administrative reform. District-affiliated municipalities with a population of more than 30,000 hold the status of a Selbständige Gemeinde, territorial authorities with more than 20,000 inhabitants could apply for conferment by the Lower Saxon state government.

In the states of Brandenburg, North Rhine-Westphalia and Rhineland-Palatinate, the status of a Große kreisangehörige Stadt is conferred by the state government to municipalities with a certain population (Brandenburg: 35,000; North Rhine-Westphalia: 60,000; Rhineland-Palatinate: 25,000). In Brandenburg and North Rhine-Westphalia, there are also Mittlere kreisangehörige Städte with a population of more than 25,000. In Thuringia, a district-affiliated local authority ensuring adequate administrative and financial parameters may apply for the status. In 2005 the Schleswig-Holstein government declared Norderstedt in Segeberg District (part of the Hamburg Metropolitan Region) a Große kreisangehörige Stadt.

In Saarland, the towns of Sankt Ingbert and Völklingen hold the comparable status of a district-affiliated Mittelstadt. In Hesse, seven towns with a population of more than 50,000 obtained the status of a Sonderstatusstadt: Bad Homburg vor der Höhe, Fulda, Giessen, Hanau, Marburg, Rüsselsheim and Wetzlar.

Saxony-Anhalt has no Große Kreisstädte and instead provides a largely homogenous range of services by the different levels of local government.
