= Alfred Biehle =

German politician

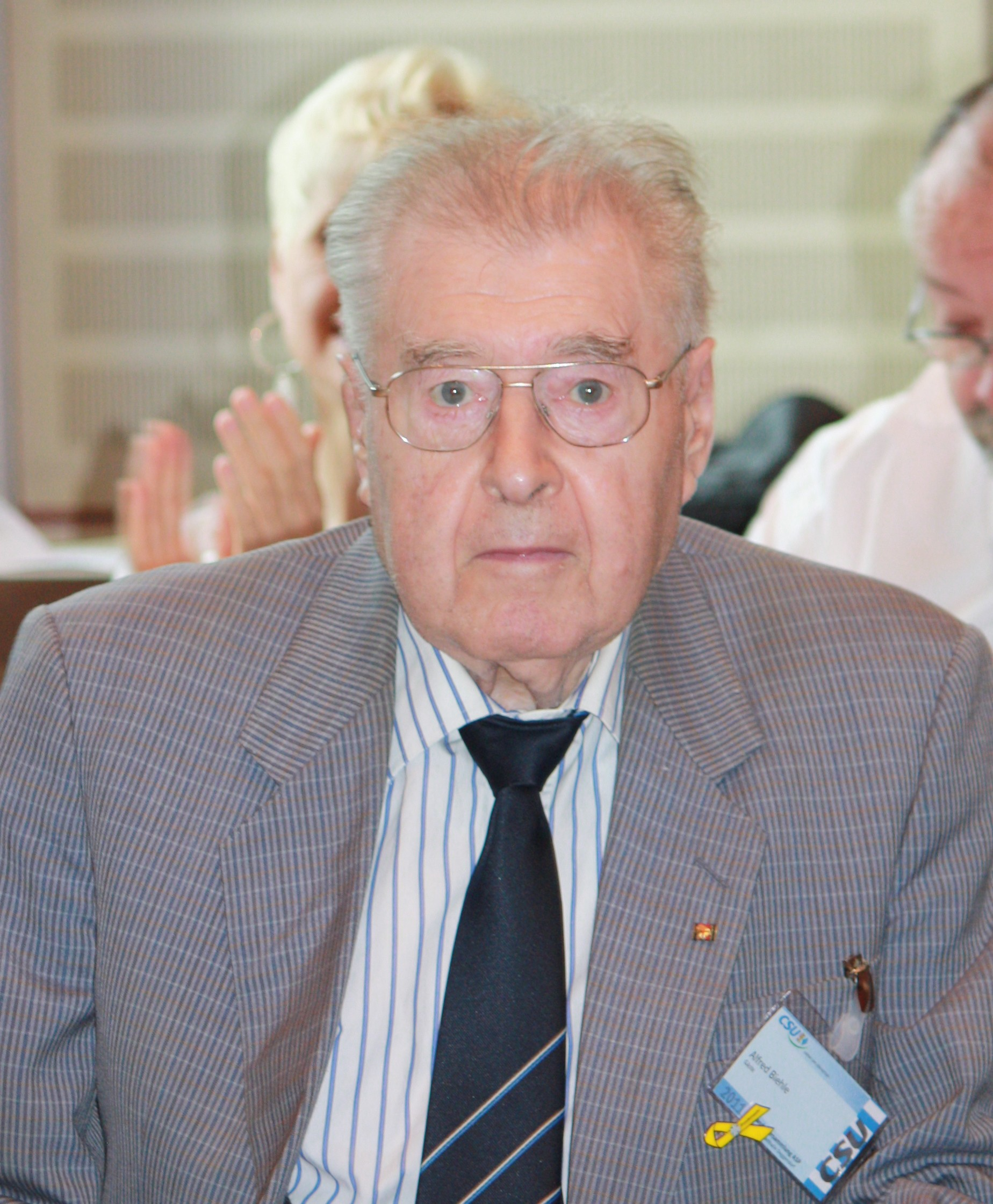
- Biehle in 2011

Member of the Bundestag
- In office 20 October 1969 – 20 December 1990
- Preceded by: Franz Xaver Geisenhofer
- Succeeded by: Wolfgang Zöller
- Constituency: Karlstadt (1969–1976); Main-Spessart (1976–1990)

Personal details
- Born: 15 November 1926 Augsburg, Germany
- Died: 29 October 2014 (aged 87) Karlstadt, Germany
- Party: Christian Social Union
- Children: 1

Alfred Biehle (15 November 1926 – 29 October 2014) was a German politician, representative of the Christian Social Union in Bavaria.

Between 1990 and 1995 he was a Parliamentary Commissioner for the Armed Forces of Germany (a representative of the Wehrbeauftragter des Deutschen Bundestages).

== See also ==
- List of Bavarian Christian Social Union politicians
