= Main-Spessart (electoral district) =

Federal electoral district of Germany

248 Main-Spessart
- Electoral district for the Bundestag
- Main-Spessart in 2025
- State: Bavaria
- Population: 254,900 (2019)
- Electorate: 191,994 (2025)
- Major settlements: Lohr am Main; Karlstadt am Main; Marktheidenfeld
- Area: 2,036.8 km^{2}

Current electoral district
- Created: 1949
- Party: CSU
- Member: Alexander Hoffmann
- Elected: 2013, 2017, 2021, 2025

Main-Spessart is an electoral constituency (German: Wahlkreis) represented in the Bundestag. It elects one member via first-past-the-post voting. Under the current constituency numbering system, it is designated as constituency 248. It is located in northwestern Bavaria, comprising the districts of Main-Spessart and Miltenberg.

Main-Spessart was created for the inaugural 1949 federal election. Since 2013, it has been represented by Alexander Hoffmann of the Christian Social Union (CSU).

== Geography ==
Main-Spessart is located in northwestern Bavaria. As of the 2021 federal election, it comprises the districts of Main-Spessart and Miltenberg.

== History ==
Main-Spessart was created in 1949, then known as Karlstadt. It acquired its current name in the 1976 election. In the 1949 election, it was Bavaria constituency 38 in the numbering system. In the 1953 through 1961 elections, it was number 233. In the 1965 through 1998 elections, it was number 235. In the 2002 and 2005 elections, it was number 250. In the 2009 through 2021 elections, it was number 249. From the 2025 election, it has been number 248.

Originally, the constituency comprised the districts of Karlstadt, Bad Brückenau, Gemünden am Main, Hammelburg, Lohr am Main, and Bad Neustadt an der Saale. In the 1965 through 1972 elections, it lost the Bad Neustadt an der Saale district while gaining the Alzenau in Unterfranken and Marktheidenfeld districts. It acquired its current borders in the 1976 election.

| Election | No. | Name | Borders |
|---|---|---|---|
| 1949 | 38 | Karlstadt | Karlstadt district; Bad Brückenau district; Gemünden am Main district; Hammelburg district; Lohr am Main district; Bad Neustadt an der Saale district |
| 1953 | 233 | Karlstadt | Karlstadt district; Bad Brückenau district; Gemünden am Main district; Hammelburg district; Lohr am Main district; Bad Neustadt an der Saale district |
| 1957 | 233 | Karlstadt | Karlstadt district; Bad Brückenau district; Gemünden am Main district; Hammelburg district; Lohr am Main district; Bad Neustadt an der Saale district |
| 1961 | 233 | Karlstadt | Karlstadt district; Bad Brückenau district; Gemünden am Main district; Hammelburg district; Lohr am Main district; Bad Neustadt an der Saale district |
| 1965 | 235 | Karlstadt | Karlstadt district; Bad Brückenau district; Gemünden am Main district; Hammelburg district; Lohr am Main district; Alzenau in Unterfranken district; Marktheidenfeld district |
| 1969 | 235 | Karlstadt | Karlstadt district; Bad Brückenau district; Gemünden am Main district; Hammelburg district; Lohr am Main district; Alzenau in Unterfranken district; Marktheidenfeld district |
| 1972 | 235 | Karlstadt | Karlstadt district; Bad Brückenau district; Gemünden am Main district; Hammelburg district; Lohr am Main district; Alzenau in Unterfranken district; Marktheidenfeld district |
| 1976 | 235 | Main-Spessart | Main-Spessart district; Miltenberg district |
| 1980 | 235 | Main-Spessart | Main-Spessart district; Miltenberg district |
| 1983 | 235 | Main-Spessart | Main-Spessart district; Miltenberg district |
| 1987 | 235 | Main-Spessart | Main-Spessart district; Miltenberg district |
| 1990 | 235 | Main-Spessart | Main-Spessart district; Miltenberg district |
| 1994 | 235 | Main-Spessart | Main-Spessart district; Miltenberg district |
| 1998 | 235 | Main-Spessart | Main-Spessart district; Miltenberg district |
| 2002 | 250 | Main-Spessart | Main-Spessart district; Miltenberg district |
| 2005 | 250 | Main-Spessart | Main-Spessart district; Miltenberg district |
| 2009 | 249 | Main-Spessart | Main-Spessart district; Miltenberg district |
| 2013 | 249 | Main-Spessart | Main-Spessart district; Miltenberg district |
| 2017 | 249 | Main-Spessart | Main-Spessart district; Miltenberg district |
| 2021 | 249 | Main-Spessart | Main-Spessart district; Miltenberg district |
| 2025 | 248 | Main-Spessart | Main-Spessart district; Miltenberg district |

== Members ==
Like most constituencies in rural Bavaria, it is an CSU safe seat, the party holding the seat continuously since its creation. It was first represented by Maria Probst from 1949 to 1969, followed by Alfred Biehle from 1969 to 1990. Wolfgang Zöller was representative from 1990 to 2013. Alexander Hoffmann was elected in 2013, and re-elected in 2017, 2021, and 2025.

| Election | Member | Party | % |
|---|---|---|---|
| 1949 | Maria Probst | CSU | 54.0 |
| 1953 | Maria Probst | CSU | 68.5 |
| 1957 | Maria Probst | CSU | 70.4 |
| 1961 | Maria Probst | CSU | 68.7 |
| 1965 | Maria Probst | CSU | 67.5 |
| 1969 | Alfred Biehle | CSU | 64.1 |
| 1972 | Alfred Biehle | CSU | 64.6 |
| 1976 | Alfred Biehle | CSU | 63.5 |
| 1980 | Alfred Biehle | CSU | 62.3 |
| 1983 | Alfred Biehle | CSU | 65.6 |
| 1987 | Alfred Biehle | CSU | 61.6 |
| 1990 | Wolfgang Zöller | CSU | 57.7 |
| 1994 | Wolfgang Zöller | CSU | 55.4 |
| 1998 | Wolfgang Zöller | CSU | 53.4 |
| 2002 | Wolfgang Zöller | CSU | 59.0 |
| 2005 | Wolfgang Zöller | CSU | 56.8 |
| 2009 | Wolfgang Zöller | CSU | 52.4 |
| 2013 | Alexander Hoffmann | CSU | 51.7 |
| 2017 | Alexander Hoffmann | CSU | 46.6 |
| 2021 | Alexander Hoffmann | CSU | 38.6 |
| 2025 | Alexander Hoffmann | CSU | 45.5 |

== Election results ==
=== 2025 election ===
Federal election (2025): Main-Spessart
| Notes: | Blue background denotes the winner of the electorate vote. Pink background denotes a candidate elected from their party list. Yellow background denotes an electorate win by a list member, or other incumbent. A ✓ or ✗ denotes status of any incumbent, win or lose respectively. | | | | | | |
| Party | Candidate | Votes | % | ±% | Party votes | % | ±% |
|---|---|---|---|---|---|---|---|
| CSU | ✓ Alexander Hoffmann | 74,872 | 45.5 | ▲6.9 | 67,725 | 41.1 | ▲6.6 |
| AfD | Kerim Denis Erdem | 29,811 | 18.1 | ▲10.1 | 31,911 | 19.4 | ▲10.5 |
| SPD | Bernd Rützel | 25,758 | 15.7 | ▼5.8 | 20,525 | 12.4 | ▼8.4 |
| Greens | Peter Weis | 13,734 | 8.3 | ▼1.7 | 14,699 | 8.9 | ▼2.4 |
| FW | Volker Walfried Hepp | 8,327 | 5.1 | ▼5.0 | 6,235 | 3.8 | ▼2.9 |
| Left | Andreas Adrian | 6,798 | 4.1 | ▲1.5 | 8,065 | 4.9 | ▲2.5 |
| FDP | Noah Winfried Kirchgeßner | 3,807 | 2.3 | ▼3.8 | 5,892 | 3.6 | ▼5.4 |
| BSW | | | | | 5,194 | 3.2 | |
| APT | | | | | 1,427 | 0.9 | ▼0.4 |
| Volt | | | | | 956 | 0.6 | ▲0.4 |
| PARTEI | | | | | 605 | 0.4 | ▼0.4 |
| dieBasis | | | | | 591 | 0.4 | ▼1.5 |
| ÖDP | Wolfgang Franz Winter | 1,431 | 0.9 | Steady | 549 | 0.3 | ▼0.2 |
| BD | | | | | 219 | 0.1 | |
| BP | | | | | 168 | 0.1 | ▼0.1 |
| Humanists | | | | | 97 | 0.1 | Steady |
| MLPD | | | | | 29 | 0.0 | Steady |
| Informal votes | | 947 | | | 598 | | |
| Total valid votes | | 164,538 | | | 164,887 | | |
| Turnout | | 165,485 | 86.2 | ▲4.9 | | | |
| CSU hold | Majority | 45,061 | 27.4 | ▲10.3 | | | |

=== 2021 election ===
Federal election (2021): Main-Spessart
| Notes: | Blue background denotes the winner of the electorate vote. Pink background denotes a candidate elected from their party list. Yellow background denotes an electorate win by a list member, or other incumbent. A ✓ or ✗ denotes status of any incumbent, win or lose respectively. | | | | | | |
| Party | Candidate | Votes | % | ±% | Party votes | % | ±% |
|---|---|---|---|---|---|---|---|
| CSU | ✓ Alexander Hoffmann | 60,489 | 38.6 | ▼8.0 | 54,097 | 34.4 | ▼7.4 |
| SPD | Bernd Rützel | 33,700 | 21.5 | ▼1.1 | 32,771 | 20.9 | ▲2.3 |
| Greens | Armin Beck | 15,813 | 10.1 | ▲3.0 | 17,806 | 11.3 | ▲3.7 |
| FW | Jessica Klug | 15,774 | 10.1 | ▲6.5 | 10,496 | 6.7 | ▲3.8 |
| AfD | René Jentzsch | 12,576 | 8.0 | ▼1.0 | 13,918 | 8.9 | ▼1.9 |
| FDP | Werner Jannek | 9,514 | 6.1 | ▲1.1 | 14,151 | 9.0 | ▲0.2 |
| Left | Andreas Adrian | 4,070 | 2.6 | ▼2.2 | 3,685 | 2.3 | ▼3.1 |
| dieBasis | Sabine Schmitt | 3,195 | 2.0 | | 2,895 | 1.8 | |
| Tierschutzpartei | | | | | 2,042 | 1.3 | ▲0.4 |
| PARTEI | | | | | 1,157 | 0.7 | ▲0.1 |
| ÖDP | Wolfgang Winter | 1,414 | 0.9 | ▼0.4 | 772 | 0.5 | ▼0.1 |
| Team Todenhöfer | | | | | 528 | 0.3 | |
| Pirates | | | | | 487 | 0.3 | 0.0 |
| Unabhängige | | | | | 386 | 0.2 | |
| BP | | | | | 379 | 0.2 | 0.0 |
| Volt | | | | | 322 | 0.2 | |
| Gesundheitsforschung | | | | | 240 | 0.2 | 0.0 |
| V-Partei3 | | | | | 184 | 0.1 | ▼0.2 |
| NPD | | | | | 135 | 0.1 | ▼0.2 |
| Bündnis C | | | | | 129 | 0.1 | |
| du. | | | | | 122 | 0.1 | |
| The III. Path | | | | | 116 | 0.1 | |
| Humanists | | | | | 98 | 0.1 | |
| LKR | Daniel Roth | 240 | 0.2 | | 96 | 0.1 | |
| MLPD | | | | | 31 | 0.0 | 0.0 |
| DKP | | | | | 24 | 0.0 | 0.0 |
| Informal votes | | 1,348 | | | 1,066 | | |
| Total valid votes | | 156,785 | | | 157,067 | | |
| Turnout | | 158,133 | 81.3 | ▲1.2 | | | |
| CSU hold | Majority | 26,789 | 17.1 | ▼6.9 | | | |

=== 2017 election ===
Federal election (2017): Main-Spessart
| Notes: | Blue background denotes the winner of the electorate vote. Pink background denotes a candidate elected from their party list. Yellow background denotes an electorate win by a list member, or other incumbent. A ✓ or ✗ denotes status of any incumbent, win or lose respectively. | | | | | | |
| Party | Candidate | Votes | % | ±% | Party votes | % | ±% |
|---|---|---|---|---|---|---|---|
| CSU | ✓ Alexander Hoffmann | 72,406 | 46.6 | ▼5.1 | 65,245 | 41.8 | ▼7.6 |
| SPD | Bernd Rützel | 35,148 | 22.6 | ▼0.6 | 28,903 | 18.5 | ▼3.0 |
| AfD | Gottfried Walter | 14,075 | 9.1 | ▲5.8 | 16,856 | 10.8 | ▲6.9 |
| Greens | Sabine Stellrecht-Schmidt | 11,050 | 7.1 | ▲0.9 | 11,939 | 7.7 | ▲0.6 |
| FDP | Helge Ziegler | 7,708 | 5.0 | ▲2.4 | 13,720 | 8.8 | ▲4.3 |
| Left | Antje Clemens | 7,515 | 4.8 | ▲1.7 | 8,562 | 5.5 | ▲2.1 |
| FW | Robert Starosta | 5,488 | 3.5 | ▼2.2 | 4,511 | 2.9 | ▼1.1 |
| PARTEI | | | | | 1,055 | 0.7 | |
| ÖDP | Wolfgang-Franz Winter | 1,987 | 1.3 | | 951 | 0.6 | 0.0 |
| V-Partei³ | | | | | 515 | 0.3 | |
| Pirates | | | | | 491 | 0.3 | ▼1.6 |
| NPD | | | | | 453 | 0.3 | ▼0.7 |
| BP | | | | | 344 | 0.2 | ▼0.2 |
| DM | | | | | 343 | 0.2 | |
| Gesundheitsforschung | | | | | 255 | 0.2 | |
| BGE | | | | | 184 | 0.1 | |
| DiB | | | | | 170 | 0.1 | |
| MLPD | | | | | 52 | 0.0 | 0.0 |
| BüSo | | | | | 21 | 0.0 | 0.0 |
| DKP | | | | | 19 | 0.0 | |
| Informal votes | | 1,829 | | | 1,238 | | |
| Total valid votes | | 155,377 | | | 155,968 | | |
| Turnout | | 157,206 | 80.1 | ▲7.8 | | | |
| CSU hold | Majority | 37,258 | 24.0 | ▼4.4 | | | |

=== 2013 election ===
Federal election (2013): Main-Spessart
| Notes: | Blue background denotes the winner of the electorate vote. Pink background denotes a candidate elected from their party list. Yellow background denotes an electorate win by a list member, or other incumbent. A ✓ or ✗ denotes status of any incumbent, win or lose respectively. | | | | | | |
| Party | Candidate | Votes | % | ±% | Party votes | % | ±% |
|---|---|---|---|---|---|---|---|
| CSU | Alexander Hoffmann | 73,001 | 51.7 | ▼0.6 | 69,953 | 49.5 | ▲5.7 |
| SPD | Bernd Rützel | 32,812 | 23.3 | ▲3.4 | 30,486 | 21.6 | ▲3.7 |
| Greens | Heiko Schmidt | 8,810 | 6.2 | ▼3.2 | 9,972 | 7.1 | ▼2.8 |
| FW | Simson Hipp | 8,045 | 5.7 | | 5,619 | 4.0 | |
| AfD | Nadja Stafl | 4,652 | 3.3 | | 5,583 | 3.9 | |
| Left | Georg Liebl | 4,426 | 3.1 | ▼3.0 | 4,839 | 3.4 | ▼3.0 |
| FDP | Uwe Probst | 3,632 | 2.6 | ▼6.3 | 6,413 | 4.5 | ▼9.5 |
| Pirates | Thomas Büttner | 2,822 | 2.0 | | 2,670 | 1.9 | ▼0.1 |
| Tierschutzpartei | | | | | 1,119 | 0.8 | ▲0.1 |
| NPD | Markus Mang | 1,360 | 1.0 | ▼0.2 | 1,404 | 1.0 | ▼0.1 |
| REP | | 1,223 | 0.9 | ▼0.7 | 1,001 | 0.7 | ▼0.5 |
| ÖDP | | | | | 915 | 0.6 | ▼0.1 |
| BP | | | | | 525 | 0.4 | ▲0.1 |
| DIE FRAUEN | | | | | 301 | 0.2 | |
| DIE VIOLETTEN | | | | | 167 | 0.1 | ▼0.1 |
| Party of Reason | | | | | 166 | 0.1 | |
| RRP | | 330 | 0.2 | | 151 | 0.1 | ▼0.6 |
| PRO | | | | | 90 | 0.1 | |
| BüSo | | | | | 31 | 0.0 | 0.0 |
| MLPD | | | | | 25 | 0.0 | 0.0 |
| Informal votes | | 2,024 | | | 1,707 | | |
| Total valid votes | | 141,113 | | | 141,430 | | |
| Turnout | | 143,137 | 72.4 | ▼1.7 | | | |
| CSU hold | Majority | 40,189 | 28.4 | ▼4.1 | | | |

=== 2009 election ===
Federal election (2009): Main-Spessart
| Notes: | Blue background denotes the winner of the electorate vote. Pink background denotes a candidate elected from their party list. Yellow background denotes an electorate win by a list member, or other incumbent. A ✓ or ✗ denotes status of any incumbent, win or lose respectively. | | | | | | |
| Party | Candidate | Votes | % | ±% | Party votes | % | ±% |
|---|---|---|---|---|---|---|---|
| CSU | ✓ Wolfgang Zöller | 75,542 | 52.4 | ▼4.4 | 63,513 | 43.7 | ▼6.4 |
| SPD | Bernd Rützel | 28,659 | 19.9 | ▼8.9 | 25,872 | 17.8 | ▼9.0 |
| Greens | Heiko Schmidt | 13,649 | 9.5 | ▲3.5 | 14,285 | 9.8 | ▲3.2 |
| FDP | Laszlo Riedl | 12,858 | 8.9 | ▲5.0 | 20,360 | 14.0 | ▲5.5 |
| Left | Thomas Endres | 8,817 | 6.1 | | 9,346 | 6.4 | ▲3.3 |
| Pirates | | | | | 2,888 | 2.0 | |
| REP | Jürgen Langanki | 2,230 | 1.5 | ▼0.6 | 1,826 | 1.3 | ▼0.5 |
| NPD | Volker Cigelski | 1,620 | 1.1 | ▼0.1 | 1,575 | 1.1 | 0.0 |
| FAMILIE | | | | | 1,205 | 0.8 | ▲0.2 |
| ÖDP | | | | | 1,087 | 0.7 | |
| Tierschutzpartei | | | | | 1,067 | 0.7 | |
| RRP | | | | | 986 | 0.7 | |
| BP | | | | | 379 | 0.3 | ▲0.1 |
| DIE VIOLETTEN | | | | | 307 | 0.2 | |
| PBC | Erich Freudenberger | 921 | 0.6 | 0.0 | 232 | 0.2 | ▼0.1 |
| CM | | | | | 113 | 0.1 | |
| DVU | | | | | 59 | 0.0 | |
| BüSo | | | | | 47 | 0.0 | 0.0 |
| MLPD | | | | | 46 | 0.0 | 0.0 |
| Informal votes | | 3,186 | | | 2,289 | | |
| Total valid votes | | 144,296 | | | 145,193 | | |
| Turnout | | 147,482 | 74.1 | ▼6.0 | | | |
| CSU hold | Majority | 46,883 | 32.5 | ▲4.5 | | | |

=== 2005 election ===
Federal election (2005):Main-Spessart
| Notes: | Blue background denotes the winner of the electorate vote. Pink background denotes a candidate elected from their party list. Yellow background denotes an electorate win by a list member, or other incumbent. A ✓ or ✗ denotes status of any incumbent, win or lose respectively. | | | | | | |
| Party | Candidate | Votes | % | ±% | Party votes | % | ±% |
|---|---|---|---|---|---|---|---|
| CSU | ✓ Wolfgang Zöller | 88,171 | 56.8 | ▼2.2 | 78,161 | 50.2 | ▼7.1 |
| SPD | Heidemarie Wright | 44,689 | 28.8 | ▼1.0 | 41,828 | 26.8 | ▼2.4 |
| Greens | Nina Hecht | 9,202 | 5.9 | ▲1.1 | 10,339 | 6.6 | ▲0.7 |
| FDP | Joachim Zeller | 6,103 | 3.9 | ▲0.9 | 13,297 | 8.5 | ▲4.0 |
| Left | | | | | 4,906 | 3.1 | ▲2.6 |
| REP | Jürgen Langanki | 3,390 | 2.2 | ▲0.8 | 2,718 | 1.7 | ▲0.8 |
| NPD | Reinhold Oberlercher | 1,821 | 1.2 | | 1,680 | 1.1 | ▲0.9 |
| Familie | | | | | 1,010 | 0.6 | |
| PBC | Erich Freudenberger | 941 | 0.6 | ▲0.3 | 478 | 0.3 | ▲0.2 |
| Independent | Frank Rösner | 933 | 0.6 | | | | |
| Feminist | | | | | 466 | 0.3 | ▲0.2 |
| GRAUEN | | | | | 436 | 0.3 | ▲0.2 |
| BP | | | | | 310 | 0.2 | ▲0.1 |
| BüSo | | | | | 124 | 0.1 | ▲0.1 |
| MLPD | | | | | 84 | 0.1 | |
| Informal votes | | 3,172 | | | 2,585 | | |
| Total valid votes | | 155,250 | | | 155,837 | | |
| Turnout | | 158,422 | 80.1 | ▼3.1 | | | |
| CSU hold | Majority | 43,482 | 28 | | | | |
