= Bernd Rützel =

German politician

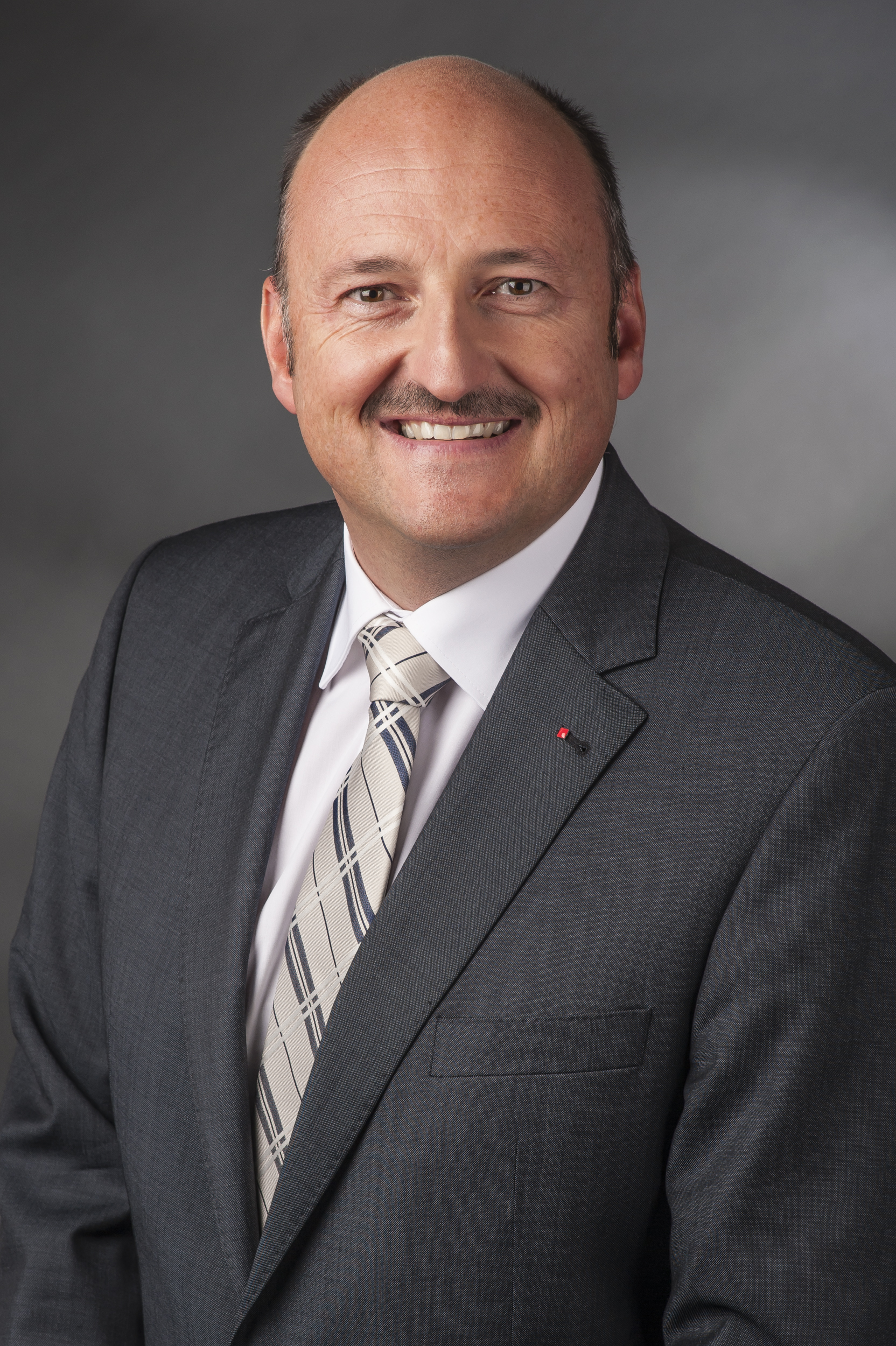
- Bernd Rützel in 2014

Member of the Bundestag
- Incumbent
- Assumed office 2013

Personal details
- Born: Bernd Ferdinand Rützel; 2 October 1968 (age 58) Gemünden am Main, West Germany (now Germany)
- Party: SPD
- Children: 2

Bernd Ferdinand Rützel (born 2 October 1968) is a German politician of the Social Democratic Party (SPD) who has been serving as a member of the Bundestag from the state of Bavaria since 2013.

== Political career ==
Rützel first became a member of the Bundestag in the 2013 German federal election, representing the Main-Spessart district.

In parliament, Rützel has since been serving on the Committee for Labour and Social Affairs. On the committee, he was his parliamentary group’s rapporteur on the 2021 Supply Chain Act. He became the committee’s chair in 2022. From 2018 to 2021, he also served on the Committee for Tourism.

In addition to his committee assignments, Rützel has been chairing the German-Canadian Parliamentary Friendship Group since 2020.

Within his parliamentary group, Rützel belongs to the Parliamentary Left, a left-wing movement.
