= Alexander Hoffmann (politician) =

German politician (b. 1975)

Alexander Hoffmann MdB
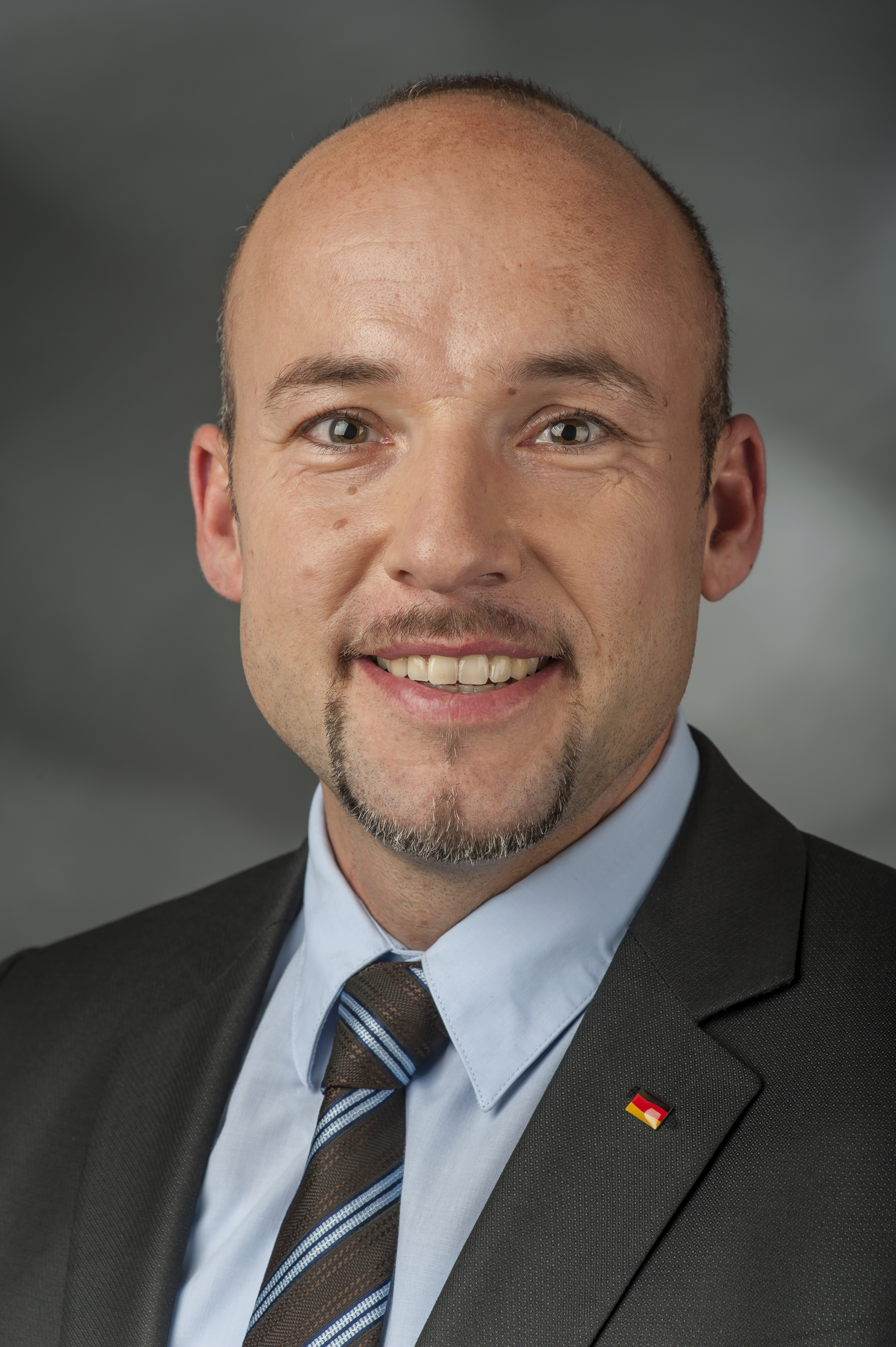
- Hoffmann in 2014

Chairman of the CSU Group in the Bundestag
- Incumbent
- Assumed office 5 May 2025
- Leader: Jens Spahn
- Preceded by: Alexander Dobrindt

Member of the Bundestag; for Main-Spessart
- Incumbent
- Assumed office 22 October 2013
- Preceded by: Wolfgang Zöller

Personal details
- Born: 6 March 1975 (age 51) Würzburg, West Germany
- Party: Christian Social Union
- Children: 2
- Education: University of Würzburg

Alexander Hoffmann (born 6 March 1975) is a German politician of the Christian Social Union (CSU) who has been serving as a member of the Bundestag from the state of Bavaria since 2013, representing Main-Spessart.

== Political career ==
Hoffmann first became a member of the Bundestag in the 2013 German federal election.

In parliament, Hoffmann has since been a member of the Committee on Legal Affairs and Consumer Protection. From 2022 to 2025, he was also a member of the Parliamentary Oversight Panel (PKGr), which provides parliamentary oversight of Germany’s intelligence services BND, BfV and MAD. That same year, he joined the Commission for the Reform of the Electoral Law and the Modernization of Parliamentary Work, co-chaired by Johannes Fechner and Nina Warken.

In the negotiations to form a Grand Coalition under the leadership of Friedrich Merz's Christian Democrats and the SPD following the 2025 German elections, Hoffmann was part of the CDU/CSU delegation in the working group on cultural affairs and media, led by Christiane Schenderlein, Volker Ullrich and Carsten Brosda.

Following the negotiations, Hoffmann succeeded Alexander Dobrindt as head of the Bundestag group of CSU parliamentarians within the joint CDU/CSU group led by Jens Spahn.
