= Wolfgang Zöller =

German politician

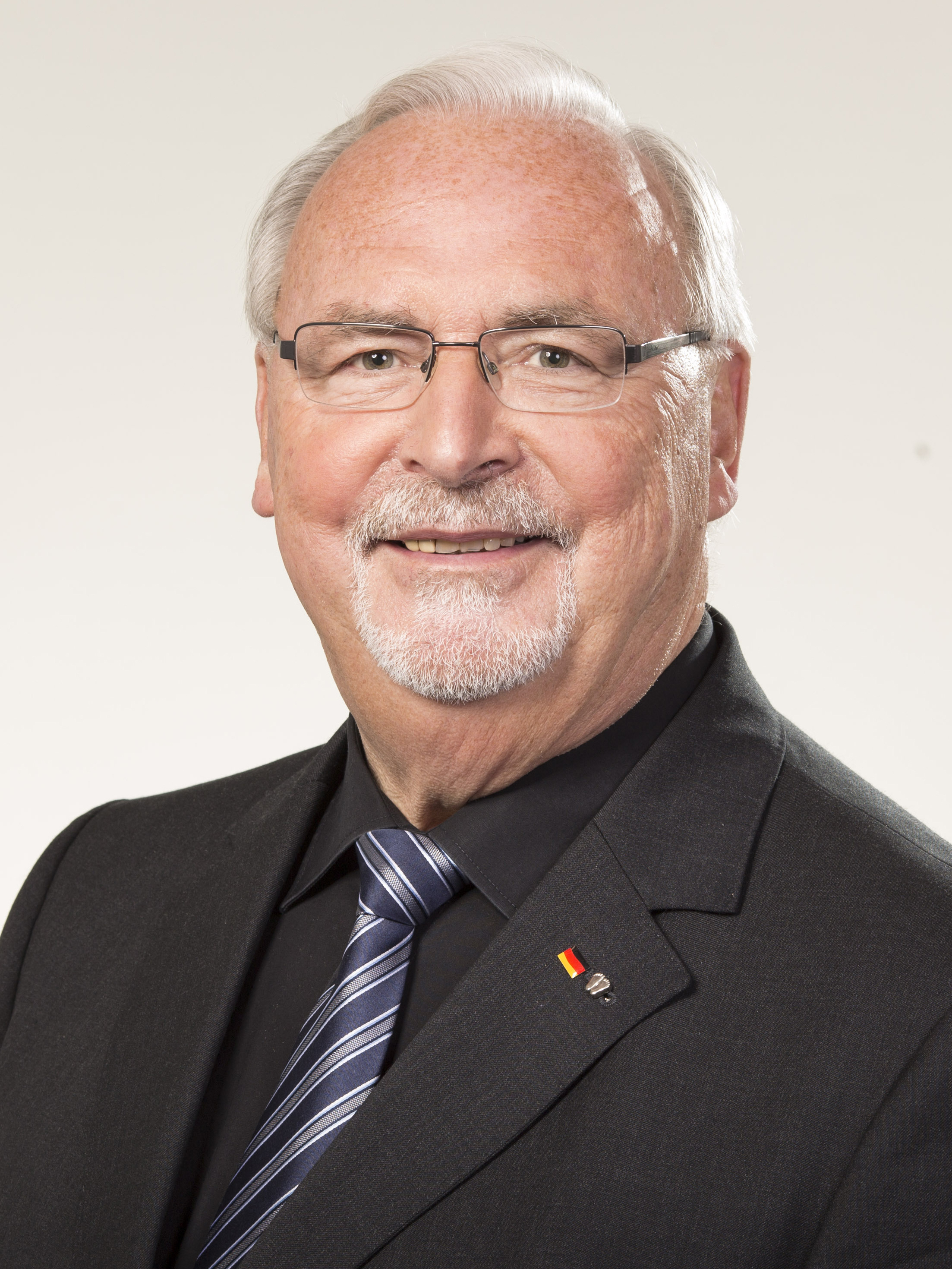
- Zöller in 2012

Member of the Bundestag; for Main-Spessart
- In office 20 December 1990 – 22 October 2013
- Preceded by: Alfred Biehle
- Succeeded by: Alexander Hoffmann

Personal details
- Born: 18 June 1942 (age 84) Obernburg, Germany
- Party: Christian Social Union
- Children: 2
- Education: Technische Hochschule Nürnberg

Wolfgang Zöller (born June 18, 1942) is a German politician, member of the Christian Social Union in Bavaria (CSU).

He was the Federal Government Commissioner for Patients' Affairs from 2009 to 2013 and had previously been deputy chairman of the CDU/CSU parliamentary group in the Bundestag since 2004.

== Early life and education ==
After completing his Mittlere Reife at the Staatliche Realschule Klingenberg, Zöller underwent an apprenticeship as a mechanic, which he completed with a skilled worker examination. Subsequently, he attended the Nuremberg Institute of Technology where he graduated as a Diploma Engineer in Mechanical Engineering (FH). Following further education as a safety engineer, from 1972 to 1990, he served as the chief safety engineer at AKZO in Obernburg am Main.

== Political career ==
In 1969, Zöller became a member of the Young Union and the CSU. From 1989 to 1995, he served as the chairman of the CSU district association in Miltenberg. Since 2001, he has been the chairman of the health policy parliamentary group within the CSU.

From 1972 to 1978, Zöller was a member of the municipal council in his birthplace, Eisenbach, and following its incorporation, from 1978 to 2002, he served on the city council of Obernburg. Since 1978, he has also been a member of the district council of Miltenberg, where he was the chairman of the CSU faction from 1984 to 1987.

Starting in 1990, Zöller was a member of the German Bundestag. Within this role, he served as the health policy spokesperson for the CSU state group from 1994 to 2005 and as the deputy chair of the Bundestag Committee on Health or Health and Social Security from 1998 to 2005. Additionally, from 2002 to 2004, he was the chair of the working group on Health and Social Security, Family, Seniors, Women, and Youth within the CSU state group. He gained attention in the Bundestag for his frequent interjections.

On 26 November 2004, Wolfgang Zöller succeeded the resigned Horst Seehofer as the Deputy Chairman of the CDU/CSU parliamentary group, responsible for Health and Social Security. From November 2005, his responsibilities extended to include Health, Nutrition, Agriculture, and Consumer Protection. Since November 2009, he has been the Patient Advocate of the Federal Government.

Wolfgang Zöller consistently entered the Bundestag as a directly elected representative for the Main-Spessart electoral district. In the 2005 Bundestag election, he secured 56.8% of the first-past-the-post votes. In the 2009 Bundestag election, he defended his direct mandate with 52.4% of the first-past-the-post votes against seven competitors.

He did not run for re-election in the 2013 Bundestag election.

On 28 April 2014, Federal Minister of Health Hermann Gröhe appointed Zöller as the Commissioner for health policy cooperation with Greece. He fulfilled this role voluntarily at the Federal Ministry of Health.

== Personal life ==
Wolfgang Zöller is Catholic, married, and the father of two children.
