= District council (Germany) =

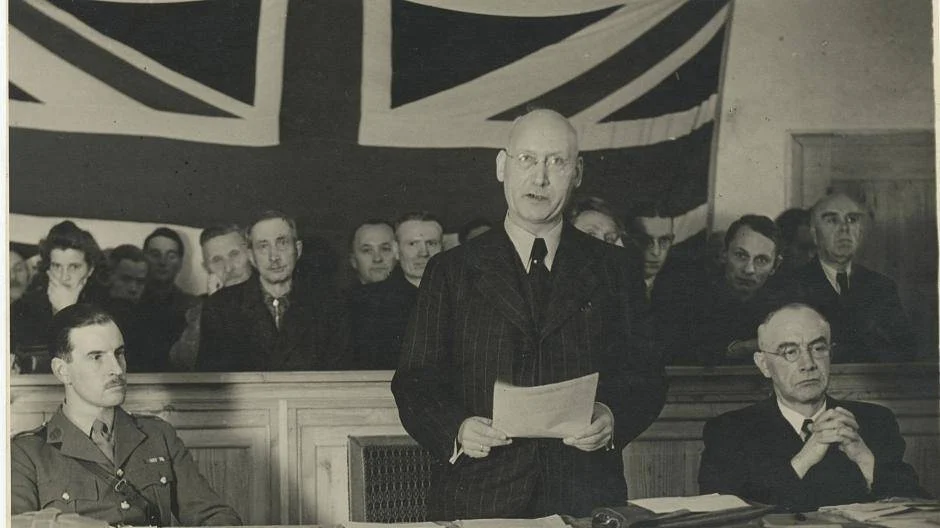
A district council meeting in Kempen-Krefeld in 1946

In Germany, the district council (German: Kreistag) is the municipal representative body at the district level (Kreise).

== Position ==
The establishment of district councils is regulated in detail in the local government law of the federal states in fulfillment of the legislative mandate under Article 28, Paragraph 1, Sentence 2 of the Basic Law. District councils are neither parliaments nor legislative bodies . Rather, as bodies of local self-government, they belong to the executive branch (like city and municipal councils).

== Competencies ==
According to all municipal codes (Gemeindeordnung) in Germany, the district council is always the principal body of the district. It decides on all fundamental matters of the district and can establish principles for the administration of the district ( authority for policymaking ). The district administrator manages day-to-day business and implements the decisions of the district council.

The district council's decision-making powers are limited to its own and delegated responsibilities. Unless all state responsibilities are also transferred to the district ( full municipalization ), the district council cannot decide on the work of the state-run department of the district administration or district office.

== Composition ==
The district council is generally composed of members elected by the district's citizens (including EU citizens) in general, free, direct, equal, and secret elections . The electoral term lasts five years in most states, and six years in Bavaria.

In some states, in addition to the volunteer members, the district council also includes the full-time chief administrative officer of the district (Landrat). The former dual leadership of the full-time senior district administrator and the then honorary district administrator, as required by the North German council constitution, has since been abolished in the latter two states (North Rhine-Westphalia: 1994, Lower Saxony: 1996).

In some states, the district council is chaired by the district administrator; in other states, a separate chairman of the district council, district council president or District President is elected from among the (other) members.

The (other) members of the district council are sometimes referred to as members of the district council, honorary members of the district council, district council members, district councillors, or district council deputies. The term "district council deputies" is misleading in that, unlike members of the Bundestag and state parliaments, the members of the district councils are not parliamentarians and do not enjoy political immunity.

The country-specific differences in the composition and chairmanship of the district council are shown in the table below:

State	State law regulation	Name of the administrative body at district level	Composition of the district council	Chair of the district council	ref
Baden-Württemberg	District regulations for Baden-Württemberg	district	District councilors and district administrator	District Administrator	
Bavaria	District regulations for the Free State of Bavaria	district	District councilors and district administrator	District Administrator	
Brandenburg	Municipal Constitution for the State of Brandenburg	district	District council members and district administrator	Chairman of the District Council (from among the District Council members)	
Hesse	Hessian District Ordinance	district	District council members (excluding district administrator)	Chairman of the District Council (from among the District Council members)	
Mecklenburg-Western Pomerania	Municipal Constitution for the State of Mecklenburg-Western Pomerania	district	District council members (excluding district administrator)	District Council President (from the District Council)	
Lower Saxony	Lower Saxony Municipal Constitution Act	district	District council members and district administrator	Chairman of the District Council (from among the District Council members)	
North Rhine-Westphalia	District regulations for the state of North Rhine-Westphalia	Circle	District council members and district administrator	District Administrator	
Rhineland-Palatinate	District regulations for Rhineland-Palatinate	district	District council members and district administrator	District Administrator	
Saarland	Local Self-Government Act	district	Members of the District Council (excluding the District Administrator)	District Administrator	
Saxony	District regulations for the Free State of Saxony	district	District councilors and district administrator	District Administrator	
Saxony-Anhalt	District regulations for the state of Saxony-Anhalt	district	Volunteer members of the district council and district administrator	Chairman of the District Council (from among the voluntary members of the District Council)	
Schleswig-Holstein	District Ordinance for Schleswig-Holstein	Circle	District council members (excluding district administrator)	District President (from among the district council members)	
Thuringia	Thuringian Municipal Code	district	District council members and district administrator	District Administrator	

== Committees ==
The district council establishes the District Committee as the most important committee under most state regulations, the Audit Committee as well as the Youth Welfare Committee under federal law. It may establish additional committees for specific areas of responsibility to prepare its resolutions or to make final decisions.

== Special types of municipal associations ==
In the three special municipal associations, the equivalents to the district council each have their own names. In the Hanover region, the name is Regionsversammlung (Regional Assembly), in the Aachen city region, it is Städteregionstag (City Region Council), and in the Saarbrücken regional association, it is Regionalversammlung (Regional Assembly).

== See also ==
- Municipal council (Germany)
- Stadtrat
