= Alexander-von-Humboldt-Gymnasium, Schweinfurt =

Coordinates: 50°2′39.23″N 10°12′4.46″E

Alexander-von-Humboldt-Gymnasium

Location
- Geschwister-Scholl-Straße 4; 97424 Schweinfurt; Bavaria; Germany

Information
- School type: Public Gymnasium
- Founded: 1833; 193 years ago
- Head of school: Klemens Alfen
- Grades: 5–12
- Website: avhsw.de

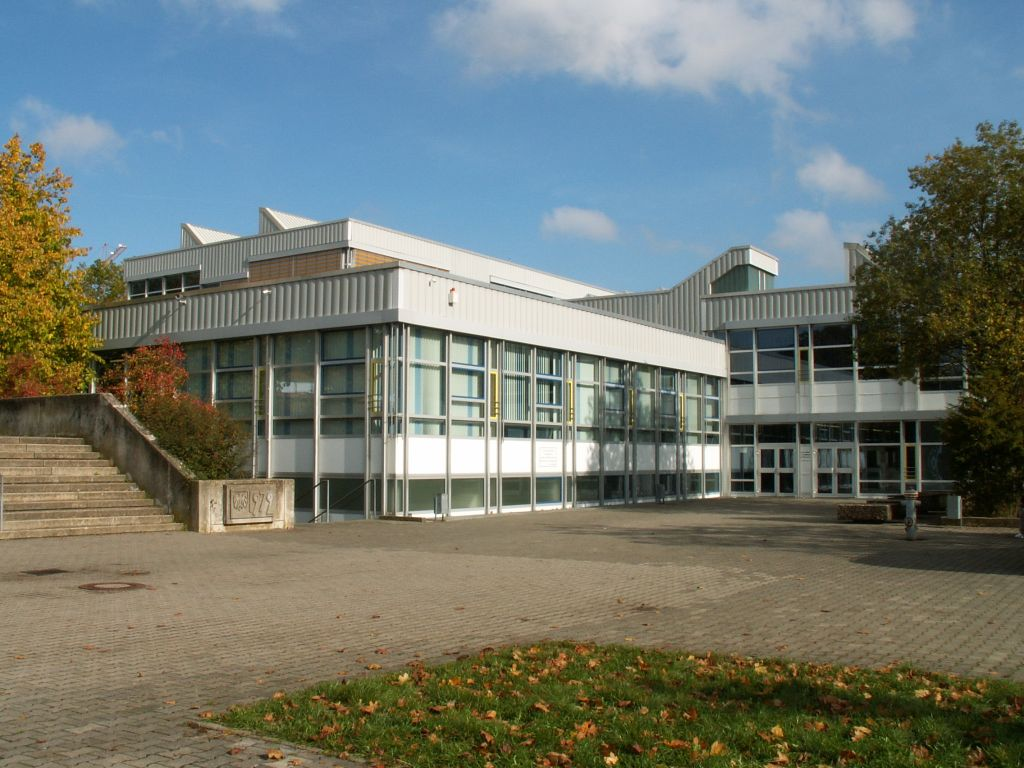
A picture of the Gymnasium.

The Alexander-von-Humboldt-Gymnasium (English: Alexander von Humboldt Gymnasium) is a Gymnasium in Schweinfurt, Bavaria, Germany.

The eponym is Alexander von Humboldt (1769–1859). The school has approximately 100 teachers and 1,200 students.
