= Gemeindeordnung =

The Gemeindeordnung (German: [ɡəˈmaɪndəˌʔɔʁdnʊŋ]) is the municipal code in German law.

== Germany ==
Historically, the Gemeindeordnung was state law. During the Weimar Republic, it became federal law named Deutsche Gemeindeordnung. The Nazi regime made several revisions to comply with their political and legal philosophy.

The German constitution Grundgesetz written in 1949 strongly emphasised the state's authority, and as a result the enactment of the municipal code was transferred back to the states.

Each German state has its own municipal code. There may be further laws like a Kommunalwahlgesetz, containing legal norms for local elections, which are also enacted by the states.

The Gemeindeordnung substitutes a city statute, as it contains a constitution with basic and special rules for every form of community from the smallest village to big cities like Munich, Frankfurt and Cologne. Berlin, Hamburg, and Bremen are themselves city-states and not part of a state.

== See also ==
- Law of Germany
