= List of members of the 6th Bundestag =

| ← | 5th | 7th | → |

Overview
- Legislative body: Bundestag
- Term: October 20, 1969 – December 13, 1972
- Election: 1969 West German federal election
- Government: First Brandt cabinet
- Members: 518
- President of the Bundestag: Kai-Uwe von Hassel

The 6th German Bundestag, the lower house of parliament of the Federal Republic of Germany, was elected on 28 September 1969 and existed between 20 October 1969 and 13 December 1972. It held a total of 199 parliamentary sessions.

On 21 October 1969 the Bundestag elected Willy Brandt (SPD) as federal Chancellor of the Federal Republic of Germany (Note: Although this was (and still is) the official name of the country. It was commonly referred to as West Germany) with 251(+14) (Note: During the existence of West Germany the Abgeordnetenhaus of Berlin elected representatives to the Bundestag for West Berlin. But since they were prohibited by an international treaty to participate in Germanys legislative process, their votes were trivial.) yes votes, 235 (+8) no votes, 4 invalid votes and 5 abstentions on the first ballot.

== Presidium of the Bundestag ==
William Born (FDP) served as Alterspräsident (Father of the House) and presided over the Konstituierende Sitzung, the first parliamentary session, until Kai-Uwe von Hassel was elected as President of the Bundestag.

On 28 October 1969 Carlo Schmid, Herman Schmitt-Vockenhausen (both SPD), Richard Jeager (CDU) and Liselotte Funcke (FDP) were elected as vice presidents of the Bundestag in on ballot with a big majority.

Kai-Uwe von Hassel was elected President of the Bundestag with 411 yes votes, 72 no votes and 34 abstentions on 20 October 1969. This corresponded to 79,5% of the vote. A better result than in his first election in February 1969 after the resignation of his predecessor Eugen Gerstenmaier.

== Composition of the Bundestag ==

Although the CDU/CSU remained the largest party in the Bundestag the SPD and FDP formed a coalition government with Willy Brandt becoming the first SPD Chancellor in the history of the Federal Republic of Germany. The CDU/CSU won 242 seats as well as eight non-voting delegates from West Berlin. The SDP increased their seat count to 224 as well as 13 non-voting delegates from West Berlin while the FDP barley remained in the Bundestag. They got 30 seats as well as one non-voting delegate from West Berlin. Due to changes in the parliamentary caucauses the SPD/FDP coalition lost their majority with resulted in a constructive vote of no confidence. However Willy Brandt remained in power due to the dissent of two members of the Bundestag.

== Summary ==
This summary includes changes in the numbers of the three caucuses (CDU/CSU, SPD, FDP):

| Time | Reason of change | CDU/CSU | SPD | FDP | Others | Total number |
|---|---|---|---|---|---|---|
| 1969 | First meeting | 242 | 224 | 30 | | 496 |
| 9 October 1970 | Erich Mende leaves the FDP caucus and becomes member of the CDU/CSU caucus | 243 | 224 | 29 | | 496 |
| 9 October 1970 | Heinz Starke leaves the FDP caucus and becomes member of the CDU/CSU caucus | 244 | 224 | 28 | | 496 |
| 9 October 1970 | Siegfried Zoglmann leaves the FDP caucus and becomes guest member of the CDU/CSU caucus | 245 | 224 | 27 | | 496 |
| 14 October 1971 | Klaus-Peter Schulz leaves the SPD caucus and becomes unaffiliated | 245 | 223 | 27 | 1 | 496 |
| 19 October 1971 | Klaus-Peter Schulz becomes a member of the CDU/CSU caucus | 246 | 223 | 27 | 0 | 496 |
| 29 February 1972 | Herbert Hupka leaves the SPD caucus and becomes unaffiliated | 246 | 222 | 27 | 1 | 496 |
| 2 March 1972 | Franz Seume leaves the SPD caucus and becomes unaffiliated | 246 | 221 | 27 | 2 | 496 |
| 3 March 1972 | Herbert Hupka becomes a member of the CDU/CSU caucus | 247 | 221 | 27 | 1 | 496 |
| 17 March 1972 | Franz Seume becomes a guest member of the CDU/CSU caucus | 248 | 221 | 27 | | 496 |
| 23 April 1972 | Wilhelm Helms leaves the FDP caucus and becomes unaffiliated | 248 | 221 | 26 | 1 | 496 |
| 5 May 1972 | Wilhelm Helms becomes a guest member of the CDU/CSU caucus | 249 | 221 | 26 | | 496 |
| 17 May 1972 | Günther Müller leaves the SPD caucus and becomes unaffiliated | 249 | 220 | 26 | 1 | 496 |
| 19 September 1972 | Günther Müller becomes a member of the CDU/CSU caucus | 250 | 220 | 26 | | 496 |

== Members ==
The following is the list of members of the 6th Bundestag:

| State | No. | Constituency | Member | Party |
|---|---|---|---|---|
| Schleswig-Holstein | 1 | Flensburg | Walter Suck | SPD |
| Schleswig-Holstein | 2 | Schleswig – Eckernförde | Gerhard Stoltenberg (Note: Gerhard Stoltenberg resigned on 3 June 1971.) | CDU |
| Schleswig-Holstein | 3 | Husum | Hermann Glüsing | CDU |
| Schleswig-Holstein | 4 | Steinburg – Süderdithmarschen | Kai-Uwe von Hassel | CDU |
| Schleswig-Holstein | 5 | Rendsburg – Neumünster | Detlef Struve | CDU |
| Schleswig-Holstein | 6 | Kiel | Hans Müthling | SPD |
| Schleswig-Holstein | 7 | Plön | Friedrich-Karl Storm | CDU |
| Schleswig-Holstein | 8 | Segeberg – Eutin | Hans-Jürgen Klinker | CDU |
| Schleswig-Holstein | 9 | Pinneberg | Hans-Ulrich Brand (Note: Hans-Ulrich Brand resigned on 3 November 1970.) | SPD |
| Schleswig-Holstein | 10 | Stormarn – Herzogtum Lauenburg | Olaf Baron von Wrangel | CDU |
| Schleswig-Holstein | 11 | Lübeck | Björn Engholm | SPD |
| Schleswig-Holstein | List | | Friedrich Beermann | SPD |
| Schleswig-Holstein | List | | Detlef Haase | SPD |
| Schleswig-Holstein | List | | Klaus Konrad | SPD |
| Schleswig-Holstein | List | | Lauritz Lauritzen | SPD |
| Schleswig-Holstein | List | | Elisabeth Orth | SPD |
| Schleswig-Holstein | List | | Richard Tamblé | SPD |
| Schleswig-Holstein | List | | Jürgen Anbuhl (Note: Jürgen Anbuhl took office on 3 November 1970, to succeed Hans-Ulrich Brand.) | SPD |
| Schleswig-Holstein | List | | Rolf Bremer | CDU |
| Schleswig-Holstein | List | | Will Rasner (Note: Will Rasner died on 15 October 1971.) | CDU |
| Schleswig-Holstein | List | | Irma Tübler | CDU |
| Schleswig-Holstein | List | | Helmut Wendelborn (Note: Helmut Wendelborn took office on 11 June 1971, to succeed Gerhard Stoltenberg.) | CDU |
| Schleswig-Holstein | List | | Uwe Looft (Note: Uwe Looft took office on 15 October 1971, to succeed Will Rasner.) | CDU |
| Schleswig-Holstein | List | | Walter Peters | FDP |
| Hamburg | 12 | Hamburg-Mitte | Eugen Glombig | SPD |
| Hamburg | 13 | Altona | Karl Wilhelm Berkhan | SPD |
| Hamburg | 14 | Eimsbüttel | Wilhelm Nölling | SPD |
| Hamburg | 15 | Hamburg-Nord I | Hans Apel | SPD |
| Hamburg | 16 | Hamburg-Nord II | Rolf Meinecke | SPD |
| Hamburg | 17 | Wandsbek | Ilse Elsner (Note: Ilse Elsner resigned on 14 May 1970.) | SPD |
| Hamburg | 18 | Bergedorf | Helmut Schmidt | SPD |
| Hamburg | 19 | Harburg | Herbert Wehner | SPD |
| Hamburg | List | | Erik Blumenfeld | CDU |
| Hamburg | List | | Carl Damm | CDU |
| Hamburg | List | | Heinrich Gewandt | CDU |
| Hamburg | List | | Gerhard Orgaß | CDU |
| Hamburg | List | | Dietrich Rollmann | CDU |
| Hamburg | List | | Klaus Schmid-Burgk | CDU |
| Hamburg | List | | Claus Arndt | SPD |
| Hamburg | List | | Alfons Pawelczyk | SPD |
| Hamburg | List | | Werner Staak (Note: Werner Staak took office on 21 May 1970, to succeed Ilse Elsner.) | SPD |
| Hamburg | List | | Victor Kirst | FDP |
| Lower Saxony | 20 | Emden – Leer | Georg Peters | SPD |
| Lower Saxony | 21 | Wilhelmshaven | Johann Cramer | SPD |
| Lower Saxony | 22 | Oldenburg | Kurt Ross | SPD |
| Lower Saxony | 23 | Delmenhorst – Wesermarsch | Heinrich Müller | SPD |
| Lower Saxony | 24 | Cuxhaven | Heinrich Schröder (Note: Heinrich Schröder resigned on 12 September 1972.) | CDU |
| Lower Saxony | 25 | Stade | Peter Tobaben | CDU |
| Lower Saxony | 26 | Emsland | Rudolf Seiters | CDU |
| Lower Saxony | 27 | Cloppenburg | Kurt Schmücker | CDU |
| Lower Saxony | 28 | Hoya | Otto Bittelmann | CDU |
| Lower Saxony | 29 | Verden | Karl Ravens | SPD |
| Lower Saxony | 30 | Soltau – Harburg | Karl-Heinz Mursch | CDU |
| Lower Saxony | 31 | Lüneburg – Lüchow-Dannenberg | Lambert Huys | CDU |
| Lower Saxony | 32 | Bersenbrück | Burkhard Ritz | CDU |
| Lower Saxony | 33 | Osnabrück | Ferdinand Erpenbeck | CDU |
| Lower Saxony | 34 | Nienburg | Günter von Nordenskjöld | CDU |
| Lower Saxony | 35 | Schaumburg | Friedel Schirmer | SPD |
| Lower Saxony | 36 | Hannover I | Egon Franke | SPD |
| Lower Saxony | 37 | Hannover II | Helmut Rohde | SPD |
| Lower Saxony | 38 | Hannover III | Werner Marquardt | SPD |
| Lower Saxony | 39 | Celle | Hans Hubrig | CDU |
| Lower Saxony | 40 | Gifhorn | Philipp von Bismarck | CDU |
| Lower Saxony | 41 | Hameln – Springe | Heinz Frehsee | SPD |
| Lower Saxony | 42 | Holzminden | Karl Ahrens | SPD |
| Lower Saxony | 43 | Hildesheim | Joachim Raffert | SPD |
| Lower Saxony | 44 | Salzgitter | Hans-Jürgen Junghans | SPD |
| Lower Saxony | 45 | Braunschweig | Walter Schmidt | SPD |
| Lower Saxony | 46 | Helmstedt – Wolfsburg | Rudolf Hauck | SPD |
| Lower Saxony | 47 | Goslar – Wolfenbüttel | Philip Rosenthal | SPD |
| Lower Saxony | 48 | Northeim | Martin Schmidt | SPD |
| Lower Saxony | 49 | Göttingen | Günter Wichert | SPD |
| Lower Saxony | List | | Odal von Alten-Nordheim | CDU |
| Lower Saxony | List | | Bruno Brandes (Note: Bruno Brandes resigned on 29 October 1969.) | CDU |
| Lower Saxony | List | | Alfred Burgemeister (Note: Alfred Burgemeister died on 23 April 1970.) | CDU |
| Lower Saxony | List | | Felix von Eckardt | CDU |
| Lower Saxony | List | | Otto Freiherr von Fircks | CDU |
| Lower Saxony | List | | Heinrich Franke | CDU |
| Lower Saxony | List | | Herbert Gruhl | CDU |
| Lower Saxony | List | | Maria Henze (Note: Maria Henze died on 10 April 1972.) | CDU |
| Lower Saxony | List | | Hans Edgar Jahn | CDU |
| Lower Saxony | List | | Gerhard Jungmann | CDU |
| Lower Saxony | List | | Margot Kalinke | CDU |
| Lower Saxony | List | | Edelhard Rock | CDU |
| Lower Saxony | List | | Herbert Schneider | CDU |
| Lower Saxony | List | | Diedrich Schröder | CDU |
| Lower Saxony | List | | J. Hermann Siemer | CDU |
| Lower Saxony | List | | Rudolf Sprung | CDU |
| Lower Saxony | List | | Franz Varelmann | CDU |
| Lower Saxony | List | | Rudolf Werner | CDU |
| Lower Saxony | List | | Eberhard Pohlmann (Note: Eberhard Pohlmann took office on 4 November 1969, to succeed Bruno Brandes.) | CDU |
| Lower Saxony | List | | Alfred Hein (Note: Alfred Hein took office on 27 April 1970, to succeed Alfred Burgemeister, but later died on 18 April 1971.) | CDU |
| Lower Saxony | List | | Heinz Hartnack (Note: Heinz Hartnack took office on 14 September 1972, to succeed Heinrich Schröder.) | CDU |
| Lower Saxony | List | | Walther Hellige (Note: Walther Hellige took office on 19 April 1971, to succeed Alfred Hein.) | CDU |
| Lower Saxony | List | | Günter Schlichting-von Rönn (Note: Günter Schlichting-von Rönn took office on 17 April 1972, to succeed Maria Henze.) | CDU |
| Lower Saxony | List | | Hermann Barche | SPD |
| Lower Saxony | List | | Lenelotte von Bothmer | SPD |
| Lower Saxony | List | | Horst Gerlach | SPD |
| Lower Saxony | List | | Hans Hermsdorf | SPD |
| Lower Saxony | List | | Hans Lemp | SPD |
| Lower Saxony | List | | Rudi Lotze (Note: Rudi Lotze died on 17 October 1971.) | SPD |
| Lower Saxony | List | | Helmuth Möhring | SPD |
| Lower Saxony | List | | Paul Neumann | SPD |
| Lower Saxony | List | | Wolfgang Schollmeyer | SPD |
| Lower Saxony | List | | Willi Wolf | SPD |
| Lower Saxony | List | | Peter Würtz | SPD |
| Lower Saxony | List | | Hermann Oetting (Note: Hermann Oetting took office on 19 October 1971, to succeed Rudi Lotze.) | SPD |
| Lower Saxony | List | | Carlo Graaff | FDP |
| Lower Saxony | List | | Wilhelm Helms | FDP |
| Lower Saxony | List | | Detlef Kleinert | FDP |
| Lower Saxony | List | | Fritz Logemann | FDP |
| Bremen | 50 | Bremen-Ost | Hermann Hansing | SPD |
| Bremen | 51 | Bremen-West | Hans Stefan Seifriz (Note: Hans Stefan Seifriz resigned on 6 January 1970.) | SPD |
| Bremen | 52 | Bremerhaven – Bremen-Nord | Harry Tallert | SPD |
| Bremen | List | | Karl Krammig | CDU |
| Bremen | List | | Ernst Müller-Hermann | CDU |
| Bremen | List | | Claus Grobecker (Note: Claus Grobecker took office on 8 January 1970, to succeed Hans Stefan Seifriz.) | SPD |
| North Rhine-Westphalia | 53 | Aachen-Stadt | Franz Josef Bach | CDU |
| North Rhine-Westphalia | 54 | Aachen-Land | Josef Müller | CDU |
| North Rhine-Westphalia | 55 | Geilenkirchen – Heinsberg | Fritz Burgbacher | CDU |
| North Rhine-Westphalia | 56 | Düren | Herbert Hermesdorf | CDU |
| North Rhine-Westphalia | 57 | Bergheim (Erft) | Karl Gatzen | CDU |
| North Rhine-Westphalia | 58 | Köln-Land | Rudi Adams | SPD |
| North Rhine-Westphalia | 59 | Cologne I | Hans-Jürgen Wischnewski | SPD |
| North Rhine-Westphalia | 60 | Cologne II | Katharina Focke | SPD |
| North Rhine-Westphalia | 61 | Cologne III | Hubert Weber | SPD |
| North Rhine-Westphalia | 62 | Cologne IV | Erich Henke | SPD |
| North Rhine-Westphalia | 63 | Bonn | Alo Hauser | CDU |
| North Rhine-Westphalia | 64 | Siegkreis I – Bonn-Land | Georg Kliesing | CDU |
| North Rhine-Westphalia | 65 | Oberbergischer Kreis – Siegkreis II | Gustav Stein | CDU |
| North Rhine-Westphalia | 66 | Rheinisch-Bergischer Kreis | Paul Lücke | CDU |
| North Rhine-Westphalia | 67 | Leverkusen – Opladen | Bruno Wiefel | SPD |
| North Rhine-Westphalia | 68 | Remscheid | Kurt Wüster | SPD |
| North Rhine-Westphalia | 69 | Wuppertal I | Adolf Scheu | SPD |
| North Rhine-Westphalia | 70 | Wuppertal II | Kurt Matthes | SPD |
| North Rhine-Westphalia | 71 | Solingen | Arthur Killat | SPD |
| North Rhine-Westphalia | 72 | Düsseldorf-Mettmann I | Heinz Pensky | SPD |
| North Rhine-Westphalia | 73 | Düsseldorf-Mettmann II | Georg Neemann | SPD |
| North Rhine-Westphalia | 74 | Düsseldorf I | Gottfried Arnold | CDU |
| North Rhine-Westphalia | 75 | Düsseldorf II | Helmut Lenders | SPD |
| North Rhine-Westphalia | 76 | Düsseldorf III | Manfred Geßner | SPD |
| North Rhine-Westphalia | 77 | Neuss – Grevenbroich I | Josef Rommerskirchen | CDU |
| North Rhine-Westphalia | 78 | Rheydt – Grevenbroich II | Alphons Horten | CDU |
| North Rhine-Westphalia | 79 | Mönchengladbach | Curt Becker | CDU |
| North Rhine-Westphalia | 80 | Krefeld | Ferdinand Schmidt | SPD |
| North Rhine-Westphalia | 81 | Kempen-Krefeld | Hugo Hammans | CDU |
| North Rhine-Westphalia | 82 | Moers | Jürgen Schmude | SPD |
| North Rhine-Westphalia | 83 | Kleve | Emil Solke | CDU |
| North Rhine-Westphalia | 84 | Dinslaken | Udo Hein (Note: Udo Hein died on 19 January 1971.) | SPD |
| North Rhine-Westphalia | 85 | Oberhausen | Erich Meinike | SPD |
| North Rhine-Westphalia | 86 | Mülheim | Willi Müller | SPD |
| North Rhine-Westphalia | 87 | Essen I | Erwin Lange | SPD |
| North Rhine-Westphalia | 88 | Essen II | Karl Bergmann | SPD |
| North Rhine-Westphalia | 89 | Essen III | Antje Huber | SPD |
| North Rhine-Westphalia | 90 | Duisburg I | Eberhard Brünen | SPD |
| North Rhine-Westphalia | 91 | Duisburg II | Hermann Spillecke | SPD |
| North Rhine-Westphalia | 92 | Ahaus – Bocholt | Hermann Josef Unland | CDU |
| North Rhine-Westphalia | 93 | Tecklenburg | Wilhelm Rawe | CDU |
| North Rhine-Westphalia | 94 | Beckum – Warendorf | Heinrich Windelen | CDU |
| North Rhine-Westphalia | 95 | Münster | Franz Berding | CDU |
| North Rhine-Westphalia | 96 | Steinfurt – Coesfeld | Gottfried Köster | CDU |
| North Rhine-Westphalia | 97 | Gelsenkirchen I | Josef Löbbert | SPD |
| North Rhine-Westphalia | 98 | Gelsenkirchen II | Hans Gertzen | SPD |
| North Rhine-Westphalia | 99 | Recklinghausen-Land | Günther Eckerland | SPD |
| North Rhine-Westphalia | 100 | Recklinghausen-Stadt | Erich Wolfram | SPD |
| North Rhine-Westphalia | 101 | Bottrop – Gladbeck | Johann Wuwer | SPD |
| North Rhine-Westphalia | 102 | Höxter | Gerd Ritgen | CDU |
| North Rhine-Westphalia | 103 | Bielefeld-Land | Heinrich Junker | SPD |
| North Rhine-Westphalia | 104 | Bielefeld-Stadt | Gerhard Koch | SPD |
| North Rhine-Westphalia | 105 | Detmold – Lippe | August Berlin | SPD |
| North Rhine-Westphalia | 106 | Paderborn – Wiedenbrück | Rainer Barzel | CDU |
| North Rhine-Westphalia | 107 | Herford | Günter Biermann | SPD |
| North Rhine-Westphalia | 108 | Minden | Friedrich Schonhofen | SPD |
| North Rhine-Westphalia | 109 | Lüdinghausen | Günter Rinsche | CDU |
| North Rhine-Westphalia | 110 | Wanne-Eickel – Wattenscheid | Heinz Westphal | SPD |
| North Rhine-Westphalia | 111 | Herne – Castrop-Rauxel | Herbert Kriedemann | SPD |
| North Rhine-Westphalia | 112 | Ennepe-Ruhr-Kreis | Wilhelm Michels | SPD |
| North Rhine-Westphalia | 113 | Hagen | Lothar Wrede | SPD |
| North Rhine-Westphalia | 114 | Dortmund I | Karl Schiller | SPD |
| North Rhine-Westphalia | 115 | Dortmund II | Friedhelm Dohmann (Note: Friedhelm Dohmann died on 20 February 1970.) | SPD |
| North Rhine-Westphalia | 116 | Dortmund III | Walter Behrendt | SPD |
| North Rhine-Westphalia | 117 | Bochum | Karl Liedtke | SPD |
| North Rhine-Westphalia | 118 | Bochum – Witten | Herbert Baack | SPD |
| North Rhine-Westphalia | 119 | Iserlohn | Werner Jacobi (Note: Werner Jacobi died on 5 March 1970.) | SPD |
| North Rhine-Westphalia | 120 | Lippstadt – Brilon | Bernhard Balkenhol | CDU |
| North Rhine-Westphalia | 121 | Olpe – Meschede | Franz Lenze | CDU |
| North Rhine-Westphalia | 122 | Arnsberg – Soest | Ernst Majonica | CDU |
| North Rhine-Westphalia | 123 | Unna | Manfred Schulte | SPD |
| North Rhine-Westphalia | 124 | Altena – Lüdenscheid | Friedhelm Halfmeier | SPD |
| North Rhine-Westphalia | 125 | Siegen – Wittgenstein | Hermann Schmidt | SPD |
| North Rhine-Westphalia | List | | Ulrich Berger | CDU |
| North Rhine-Westphalia | List | | Karl Bewerunge | CDU |
| North Rhine-Westphalia | List | | Kurt Birrenbach | CDU |
| North Rhine-Westphalia | List | | Theodor Blank (Note: Theodor Blank resigned on 21 April 1972.) | CDU |
| North Rhine-Westphalia | List | | Helmut von Bockelberg | CDU |
| North Rhine-Westphalia | List | | Günter Böhme | CDU |
| North Rhine-Westphalia | List | | Aenne Brauksiepe | CDU |
| North Rhine-Westphalia | List | | Ferdinand Breidbach | CDU |
| North Rhine-Westphalia | List | | Rembert van Delden | CDU |
| North Rhine-Westphalia | List | | Hans Dichgans | CDU |
| North Rhine-Westphalia | List | | Leo Ernesti | CDU |
| North Rhine-Westphalia | List | | Göke Frerichs | CDU |
| North Rhine-Westphalia | List | | Martin Horstmeier | CDU |
| North Rhine-Westphalia | List | | Maria Jacobi | CDU |
| North Rhine-Westphalia | List | | Hans Katzer | CDU |
| North Rhine-Westphalia | List | | Heinrich Köppler (Note: Heinrich Köppler resigned on 8 August 1970.) | CDU |
| North Rhine-Westphalia | List | | Wilhelm Krampe | CDU |
| North Rhine-Westphalia | List | | Konrad Kraske | CDU |
| North Rhine-Westphalia | List | | Egon Lampersbach | CDU |
| North Rhine-Westphalia | List | | Eduard Lensing | CDU |
| North Rhine-Westphalia | List | | Manfred Luda | CDU |
| North Rhine-Westphalia | List | | Josef Mick | CDU |
| North Rhine-Westphalia | List | | Paul Mikat | CDU |
| North Rhine-Westphalia | List | | Adolf Müller | CDU |
| North Rhine-Westphalia | List | | Winfried Pinger | CDU |
| North Rhine-Westphalia | List | | Gerhard Reddemann | CDU |
| North Rhine-Westphalia | List | | Josef Rösing | CDU |
| North Rhine-Westphalia | List | | Hermann Josef Russe | CDU |
| North Rhine-Westphalia | List | | Botho Prinz zu Sayn-Wittgenstein-Hohenstein | CDU |
| North Rhine-Westphalia | List | | Otto Schmidt | CDU |
| North Rhine-Westphalia | List | | Kurt Schober | CDU |
| North Rhine-Westphalia | List | | Gerhard Schröder | CDU |
| North Rhine-Westphalia | List | | Christa Schroeder | CDU |
| North Rhine-Westphalia | List | | Georg Schulhoff | CDU |
| North Rhine-Westphalia | List | | Gerd Springorum | CDU |
| North Rhine-Westphalia | List | | Maria Stommel | CDU |
| North Rhine-Westphalia | List | | Max Vehar | CDU |
| North Rhine-Westphalia | List | | Friedrich Vogel | CDU |
| North Rhine-Westphalia | List | | Wolfgang Vogt | CDU |
| North Rhine-Westphalia | List | | Günter Volmer | CDU |
| North Rhine-Westphalia | List | | Bernhard Winkelheide | CDU |
| North Rhine-Westphalia | List | | Erika Wolf | CDU |
| North Rhine-Westphalia | List | | Otto Wulff | CDU |
| North Rhine-Westphalia | List | | Valentin Brück (Note: Valentin Brück took office on 14 August 1970, to succeed Heinrich Köppler.) | CDU |
| North Rhine-Westphalia | List | | Paul Löher (Note: Paul Löher took office on 23 April 1972, to succeed Theodor Blank.) | CDU |
| North Rhine-Westphalia | List | | Walter Arendt | SPD |
| North Rhine-Westphalia | List | | Helmuth Becker | SPD |
| North Rhine-Westphalia | List | | Willy Brandt | SPD |
| North Rhine-Westphalia | List | | Hermann Buschfort | SPD |
| North Rhine-Westphalia | List | | Bernhard Bußmann | SPD |
| North Rhine-Westphalia | List | | Elfriede Eilers | SPD |
| North Rhine-Westphalia | List | | Helmut Esters | SPD |
| North Rhine-Westphalia | List | | Udo Fiebig | SPD |
| North Rhine-Westphalia | List | | Karl-Heinz Hansen | SPD |
| North Rhine-Westphalia | List | | Herbert Hupka | SPD |
| North Rhine-Westphalia | List | | Günter Jaschke | SPD |
| North Rhine-Westphalia | List | | Peter-Michael Koenig | SPD |
| North Rhine-Westphalia | List | | Hubert Lemper | SPD |
| North Rhine-Westphalia | List | | Ulrich Lohmar | SPD |
| North Rhine-Westphalia | List | | Wilhelm Maibaum | SPD |
| North Rhine-Westphalia | List | | Wilderich Freiherr Ostman von der Leye | SPD |
| North Rhine-Westphalia | List | | Heinz Pöhler | SPD |
| North Rhine-Westphalia | List | | Annemarie Renger | SPD |
| North Rhine-Westphalia | List | | Engelbert Sander | SPD |
| North Rhine-Westphalia | List | | Karl-Heinz Saxowski | SPD |
| North Rhine-Westphalia | List | | Hildegard Schimschok | SPD |
| North Rhine-Westphalia | List | | Albert Tönjes | SPD |
| North Rhine-Westphalia | List | | Franz Vit | SPD |
| North Rhine-Westphalia | List | | Karl-Heinz Walkhoff | SPD |
| North Rhine-Westphalia | List | | Martin Wendt | SPD |
| North Rhine-Westphalia | List | | Karl Wienand | SPD |
| North Rhine-Westphalia | List | | Hans-Eberhard Urbaniak (Note: Hans-Eberhard Urbaniak took office on 9 March 1970, to succeed Werner Jacobi.) | SPD |
| North Rhine-Westphalia | List | | Heinrich Welslau (Note: Heinrich Welslau took office on 26 February 1970, to succeed Friedhelm Dohmann.) | SPD |
| North Rhine-Westphalia | List | | Friedhelm Farthmann (Note: Friedhelm Farthmann took office on 26 June 1971, to succeed Udo Hein.) | SPD |
| North Rhine-Westphalia | List | | Ernst Achenbach | FDP |
| North Rhine-Westphalia | List | | Wolfram Dorn | FDP |
| North Rhine-Westphalia | List | | Liselotte Funcke | FDP |
| North Rhine-Westphalia | List | | Hans-Dietrich Genscher | FDP |
| North Rhine-Westphalia | List | | Gerhard Kienbaum (Note: Gerhard Kienbaum resigned on 2 May 1972.) | FDP |
| North Rhine-Westphalia | List | | Erich Mende | FDP |
| North Rhine-Westphalia | List | | Alfred Ollesch | FDP |
| North Rhine-Westphalia | List | | Walter Scheel | FDP |
| North Rhine-Westphalia | List | | Siegfried Zoglmann | FDP |
| North Rhine-Westphalia | List | | Rudolf Opitz (Note: Rudolf Opitz took office on 2 May 1972, to succeed Gerhard Kienbaum.) | FDP |
| Hesse | 126 | Waldeck | Karl Bechert | SPD |
| Hesse | 127 | Kassel | Holger Börner | SPD |
| Hesse | 128 | Eschwege | Egon Höhmann | SPD |
| Hesse | 129 | Fritzlar-Homberg | Heinz Kreutzmann | SPD |
| Hesse | 130 | Hersfeld | Wendelin Enders | SPD |
| Hesse | 131 | Marburg | Gerhard Jahn | SPD |
| Hesse | 132 | Wetzlar | Helmut Kater | SPD |
| Hesse | 133 | Gießen | Erwin Horn | SPD |
| Hesse | 134 | Fulda | Hermann Götz | CDU |
| Hesse | 135 | Obertaunuskreis | Dietrich Sperling | SPD |
| Hesse | 136 | Friedberg | Georg Schlaga | SPD |
| Hesse | 137 | Limburg | Benno Erhard | CDU |
| Hesse | 138 | Wiesbaden | Horst Krockert | SPD |
| Hesse | 139 | Hanau | Gerhard Flämig | SPD |
| Hesse | 140 | Frankfurt I | Georg Leber | SPD |
| Hesse | 141 | Frankfurt II | Brigitte Freyh | SPD |
| Hesse | 142 | Frankfurt III | Hans Matthöfer | SPD |
| Hesse | 143 | Groß-Gerau | Hermann Schmitt-Vockenhausen | SPD |
| Hesse | 144 | Offenbach | Horst Schmidt (Note: Horst Schmidt resigned on 3 November 1969.) | SPD |
| Hesse | 145 | Darmstadt | Günther Metzger | SPD |
| Hesse | 146 | Dieburg | Willi Bäuerle | SPD |
| Hesse | 147 | Bergstraße | Wolfgang Schwabe | SPD |
| Hesse | List | | Friedrich Freiwald | CDU |
| Hesse | List | | Lothar Haase | CDU |
| Hesse | List | | Dieter Hussing | CDU |
| Hesse | List | | Walther Leisler Kiep | CDU |
| Hesse | List | | Carl Otto Lenz | CDU |
| Hesse | List | | Christian Lenzer | CDU |
| Hesse | List | | Helmut Link | CDU |
| Hesse | List | | Walter Löhr | CDU |
| Hesse | List | | Berthold Martin | CDU |
| Hesse | List | | Walter Picard | CDU |
| Hesse | List | | Ludwig Preiß | CDU |
| Hesse | List | | Carl Reinhard | CDU |
| Hesse | List | | Clemens Riedel | CDU |
| Hesse | List | | Hermann Stahlberg | CDU |
| Hesse | List | | Hanna Walz | CDU |
| Hesse | List | | Hans Wissebach | CDU |
| Hesse | List | | Otto Zink | CDU |
| Hesse | List | | Kurt Gscheidle (Note: Kurt Gscheidle resigned on 7 November 1969.) | SPD |
| Hesse | List | | Wolfgang Schmidt | SPD |
| Hesse | List | | Helga Timm | SPD |
| Hesse | List | | Günther Wuttke | SPD |
| Hesse | List | | Fred Zander (Note: Fred Zander took office on 3 November 1969, to succeed Horst Schmidt.) | SPD |
| Hesse | List | | Peter Säckl (Note: Peter Säckl took office on 10 November 1969, to succeed Kurt Gscheidle.) | SPD |
| Hesse | List | | Knut von Kühlmann-Stumm (Note: Knut von Kühlmann-Stumm resigned on 30 May 1972.) | FDP |
| Hesse | List | | Wolfgang Mischnick | FDP |
| Hesse | List | | Richard Wurbs | FDP |
| Hesse | List | | Alexander Menne (Note: Alexander Menne took office on 31 May 1972, to succeed Knut von Kühlmann-Stumm.) | FDP |
| Rhineland-Palatinate | 148 | Neuwied | Walter Hallstein | CDU |
| Rhineland-Palatinate | 149 | Ahrweiler | Johann Peter Josten | CDU |
| Rhineland-Palatinate | 150 | Koblenz | Egon Klepsch | CDU |
| Rhineland-Palatinate | 151 | Cochem | Klaus Bremm | CDU |
| Rhineland-Palatinate | 152 | Kreuznach | Wilhelm Dröscher (Note: Wilhelm Dröscher resigned on 12 October 1971.) | SPD |
| Rhineland-Palatinate | 153 | Bitburg | Hans Richarts | CDU |
| Rhineland-Palatinate | 154 | Trier | Carl-Ludwig Wagner | CDU |
| Rhineland-Palatinate | 155 | Montabaur | August Hanz | CDU |
| Rhineland-Palatinate | 156 | Mainz | Hugo Brandt | SPD |
| Rhineland-Palatinate | 157 | Worms | Willi Fischer | SPD |
| Rhineland-Palatinate | 158 | Frankenthal | Rudolf Kaffka | SPD |
| Rhineland-Palatinate | 159 | Ludwigshafen | Hans Bardens | SPD |
| Rhineland-Palatinate | 160 | Neustadt – Speyer | Georg Gölter | CDU |
| Rhineland-Palatinate | 161 | Kaiserslautern | Adolf Müller-Emmert | SPD |
| Rhineland-Palatinate | 162 | Pirmasens | Josef Becker | CDU |
| Rhineland-Palatinate | 163 | Landau | Albert Leicht | CDU |
| Rhineland-Palatinate | List | | Werner Buchstaller | SPD |
| Rhineland-Palatinate | List | | Hugo Collet | SPD |
| Rhineland-Palatinate | List | | Klaus von Dohnanyi | SPD |
| Rhineland-Palatinate | List | | Karl Haehser | SPD |
| Rhineland-Palatinate | List | | Luise Herklotz | SPD |
| Rhineland-Palatinate | List | | Willi Peiter | SPD |
| Rhineland-Palatinate | List | | Elfriede Seppi | SPD |
| Rhineland-Palatinate | List | | Peter Büchner (Note: Peter Büchner took office on 12 October 1971, to succeed Wilhelm Dröscher.) | SPD |
| Rhineland-Palatinate | List | | Udo Giulini | CDU |
| Rhineland-Palatinate | List | | Marie-Elisabeth Klee | CDU |
| Rhineland-Palatinate | List | | Werner Marx | CDU |
| Rhineland-Palatinate | List | | Rudolf Müller | CDU |
| Rhineland-Palatinate | List | | Elmar Pieroth | CDU |
| Rhineland-Palatinate | List | | Richard von Weizsäcker | CDU |
| Rhineland-Palatinate | List | | Kurt Jung | FDP |
| Rhineland-Palatinate | List | | Fritz-Rudolf Schultz (Note: Fritz-Rudolf Schultz resigned on 11 March 1970.) | FDP |
| Rhineland-Palatinate | List | | Lothar Krall (Note: Lothar Krall took office on 16 March 1970, to succeed Fritz-Rudolf Schultz.) | FDP |
| Baden-Württemberg | 164 | Stuttgart I | Erwin Schoettle | SPD |
| Baden-Württemberg | 165 | Stuttgart II | Ernst Haar | SPD |
| Baden-Württemberg | 166 | Stuttgart III | Horst Ehmke | SPD |
| Baden-Württemberg | 167 | Ludwigsburg | Annemarie Griesinger (Note: Annemarie Griesinger resigned on 6 September 1972.) | CDU |
| Baden-Württemberg | 168 | Heilbronn | Erhard Eppler | SPD |
| Baden-Württemberg | 169 | Leonberg – Vaihingen | Peter Petersen | CDU |
| Baden-Württemberg | 170 | Nürtingen – Böblingen | Anton Stark | CDU |
| Baden-Württemberg | 171 | Eßlingen | Thomas Ruf | CDU |
| Baden-Württemberg | 172 | Göppingen | Manfred Wörner | CDU |
| Baden-Württemberg | 173 | Ulm | Ludwig Erhard | CDU |
| Baden-Württemberg | 174 | Aalen – Heidenheim | Manfred Abelein | CDU |
| Baden-Württemberg | 175 | Schwäbisch Gmünd – Backnang | Dieter Schulte | CDU |
| Baden-Württemberg | 176 | Crailsheim | Philipp Jenninger | CDU |
| Baden-Württemberg | 177 | Waiblingen | Manfred Wende | SPD |
| Baden-Württemberg | 178 | Karlsruhe | Peter Corterier | SPD |
| Baden-Württemberg | 179 | Mannheim I | Carlo Schmid | SPD |
| Baden-Württemberg | 180 | Mannheim II | Hans Georg Schachtschabel | SPD |
| Baden-Württemberg | 181 | Heidelberg-Stadt | Alex Möller | SPD |
| Baden-Württemberg | 182 | Pforzheim – Karlsruhe-Land I | Siegfried Meister | CDU |
| Baden-Württemberg | 183 | Bruchsal – Karlsruhe-Land II | Helmut Artzinger | CDU |
| Baden-Württemberg | 184 | Heidelberg-Land – Sinsheim | Fritz Baier | CDU |
| Baden-Württemberg | 185 | Tauberbischofsheim | Karl Miltner | CDU |
| Baden-Württemberg | 186 | Konstanz | Hermann Biechele | CDU |
| Baden-Württemberg | 187 | Donaueschingen | Hansjörg Häfele | CDU |
| Baden-Württemberg | 188 | Waldshut | Kurt Georg Kiesinger | CDU |
| Baden-Württemberg | 189 | Lörrach – Müllheim | Heinz Eyrich | CDU |
| Baden-Württemberg | 190 | Freiburg | Hans Evers | CDU |
| Baden-Württemberg | 191 | Emmendingen – Wolfach | Albert Burger | CDU |
| Baden-Württemberg | 192 | Offenburg | Hans Furler | CDU |
| Baden-Württemberg | 193 | Rastatt | Hugo Hauser | CDU |
| Baden-Württemberg | 194 | Reutlingen | Anton Pfeifer | CDU |
| Baden-Württemberg | 195 | Calw | Helmut Prassler | CDU |
| Baden-Württemberg | 196 | Rottweil | Bruno Heck | CDU |
| Baden-Württemberg | 197 | Balingen | Hermann Schwörer | CDU |
| Baden-Württemberg | 198 | Biberach | Eugen Maucher | CDU |
| Baden-Württemberg | 199 | Ravensburg | Eduard Adorno (Note: Eduard Adorno resigned on 21 August 1972.) | CDU |
| Baden-Württemberg | List | | Hans-Joachim Baeuchle | SPD |
| Baden-Württemberg | List | | Hans Bay | SPD |
| Baden-Württemberg | List | | Andreas von Bülow | SPD |
| Baden-Württemberg | List | | Hermann Dürr | SPD |
| Baden-Württemberg | List | | Walter Faller | SPD |
| Baden-Württemberg | List | | Hans Geiger | SPD |
| Baden-Württemberg | List | | Fritz-Joachim Gnädinger | SPD |
| Baden-Württemberg | List | | Volker Hauff | SPD |
| Baden-Württemberg | List | | Hans Hörmann | SPD |
| Baden-Württemberg | List | | Karl-Hans Kern | SPD |
| Baden-Württemberg | List | | Ellen Lauterbach | SPD |
| Baden-Württemberg | List | | Hedwig Meermann | SPD |
| Baden-Württemberg | List | | Rainer Offergeld | SPD |
| Baden-Württemberg | List | | Klaus Richter | SPD |
| Baden-Württemberg | List | | Fritz Rinderspacher | SPD |
| Baden-Württemberg | List | | Friedrich Schäfer | SPD |
| Baden-Württemberg | List | | Marta Schanzenbach | SPD |
| Baden-Württemberg | List | | Horst Seefeld | SPD |
| Baden-Württemberg | List | | Siegbert Alber | CDU |
| Baden-Württemberg | List | | August Berberich | CDU |
| Baden-Württemberg | List | | Herbert Czaja | CDU |
| Baden-Württemberg | List | | Isidor Früh | CDU |
| Baden-Württemberg | List | | Kurt Härzschel | CDU |
| Baden-Württemberg | List | | Erwin Häussler | CDU |
| Baden-Württemberg | List | | Julius Steiner | CDU |
| Baden-Württemberg | List | | Egon Susset | CDU |
| Baden-Württemberg | List | | Kurt Wawrzik | CDU |
| Baden-Württemberg | List | | Karl Weber | CDU |
| Baden-Württemberg | List | | Ralf Dahrendorf (Note: Ralf Dahrendorf resigned on 25 August 1970.) | FDP |
| Baden-Württemberg | List | | Emmy Diemer-Nicolaus | FDP |
| Baden-Württemberg | List | | Martin Grüner | FDP |
| Baden-Württemberg | List | | Werner Mertes | FDP |
| Baden-Württemberg | List | | Karl Moersch | FDP |
| Baden-Württemberg | List | | Wolfgang Rutschke (Note: Wolfgang Rutschke resigned on 7 January 1971.) | FDP |
| Baden-Württemberg | List | | Georg Gallus (Note: Georg Gallus took office on 10 September 1970, to succeed Ralf Dahrendorf.) | FDP |
| Baden-Württemberg | List | | Kurt Spitzmüller (Note: Kurt Spitzmüller took office on 12 January 1971, to succeed Wolfgang Rutschke.) | FDP |
| Bavaria | 200 | Altötting | Valentin Dasch (Note: Valentin Dasch resigned on 15 September 1972.) | CSU |
| Bavaria | 201 | Fürstenfeldbruck | Richard Jaeger | CSU |
| Bavaria | 202 | Ingolstadt | Karl Heinz Gierenstein | CSU |
| Bavaria | 203 | Miesbach | Franz Gleissner | CSU |
| Bavaria | 204 | Munich Centre | Manfred Schmidt | SPD |
| Bavaria | 205 | Munich North | Wenzel Bredl | SPD |
| Bavaria | 206 | Munich East | Franz Marx | SPD |
| Bavaria | 207 | Munich South | Günther Müller | SPD |
| Bavaria | 208 | Munich West | Erwin Folger | SPD |
| Bavaria | 209 | Munich Land | Albert Probst | CSU |
| Bavaria | 210 | Rosenheim | Ludwig Franz | CSU |
| Bavaria | 211 | Traunstein | Matthias Engelsberger | CSU |
| Bavaria | 212 | Weilheim | Franz Josef Strauss | CSU |
| Bavaria | 213 | Deggendorf | Stefan Dittrich | CSU |
| Bavaria | 214 | Landshut | Friedrich Zimmermann | CSU |
| Bavaria | 215 | Passau | Franz Xaver Unertl (Note: Franz Xaver Unertl died on 31 December 1970.) | CSU |
| Bavaria | 216 | Straubing | Alois Rainer | CSU |
| Bavaria | 217 | Pfarrkirchen | Friedrich Kempfler | CSU |
| Bavaria | 218 | Amberg – Neumarkt | Heinrich Aigner | CSU |
| Bavaria | 219 | Burglengenfeld | Dionys Jobst | CSU |
| Bavaria | 220 | Regensburg | Hermann Höcherl | CSU |
| Bavaria | 221 | Tirschenreuth | Franz Weigl | CSU |
| Bavaria | 222 | Bamberg | Paul Röhner | CSU |
| Bavaria | 223 | Bayreuth | Albrecht Schlee | CSU |
| Bavaria | 224 | Coburg | Karl Hofmann | SPD |
| Bavaria | 225 | Hof | Martin Hirsch (Note: Martin Hirsch resigned on 8 December 1971.) | SPD |
| Bavaria | 226 | Kulmbach | Lorenz Niegel | CSU |
| Bavaria | 227 | Ansbach | Georg Ehnes (Note: Georg Ehnes resigned on 19 September 1972.) | CSU |
| Bavaria | 228 | Erlangen | Dieter Haack | SPD |
| Bavaria | 229 | Fürth | Werner Dollinger | CSU |
| Bavaria | 230 | Nuremberg North | Hans Batz | SPD |
| Bavaria | 231 | Nuremberg South | Käte Strobel | SPD |
| Bavaria | 232 | Weißenburg | Richard Stücklen | CSU |
| Bavaria | 233 | Aschaffenburg | Paul Gerlach | CSU |
| Bavaria | 234 | Bad Kissingen | Alex Hösl | CSU |
| Bavaria | 235 | Karlstadt | Alfred Biehle | CSU |
| Bavaria | 236 | Schweinfurt | Max Schulze-Vorberg | CSU |
| Bavaria | 237 | Würzburg | Linus Memmel | CSU |
| Bavaria | 238 | Augsburg | Anton Ott | CSU |
| Bavaria | 239 | Augsburg-Land | Walter Althammer | CSU |
| Bavaria | 240 | Donauwörth | Karl Heinz Lemmrich | CSU |
| Bavaria | 241 | Neu-Ulm | Leo Wagner | CSU |
| Bavaria | 242 | Kaufbeuren | Hans August Lücker | CSU |
| Bavaria | 243 | Kempten | Wolfgang Pohle (Note: Wolfgang Pohle died on 27 August 1971.) | CSU |
| Bavaria | List | | Hans Bals | SPD |
| Bavaria | List | | Hannsheinz Bauer | SPD |
| Bavaria | List | | Alfons Bayerl | SPD |
| Bavaria | List | | Fritz Böhm | SPD |
| Bavaria | List | | Ludwig Fellermaier | SPD |
| Bavaria | List | | Walter Fritsch | SPD |
| Bavaria | List | | Hermann Haage (Note: Hermann Haage died on 21 December 1970.) | SPD |
| Bavaria | List | | Karl Herold | SPD |
| Bavaria | List | | Richard Kohlberger | SPD |
| Bavaria | List | | Walter Langebeck | SPD |
| Bavaria | List | | Hans Lautenschlager | SPD |
| Bavaria | List | | Konrad Porzner | SPD |
| Bavaria | List | | Gerhard Reischl | SPD |
| Bavaria | List | | Christoph Schiller | SPD |
| Bavaria | List | | Philipp Seibert | SPD |
| Bavaria | List | | Max Seidel | SPD |
| Bavaria | List | | Paul Heinrich Simon | SPD |
| Bavaria | List | | Alois Strohmayr | SPD |
| Bavaria | List | | Hans de With | SPD |
| Bavaria | List | | Otto Wittmann | SPD |
| Bavaria | List | | Franz Josef Zebisch | SPD |
| Bavaria | List | | Georg Kahn-Ackermann (Note: Georg Kahn-Ackermann took office on 28 December 1970, to succeed Hermann Haage.) | SPD |
| Bavaria | List | | Hans Büchler (Note: Hans Büchler took office on 9 December 1971, to succeed Martin Hirsch.) | SPD |
| Bavaria | List | | Walter Becher | CSU |
| Bavaria | List | | Karl Fuchs | CSU |
| Bavaria | List | | Ingeborg Geisendörfer | CSU |
| Bavaria | List | | Franz Xaver Geisenhofer | CSU |
| Bavaria | List | | Karl Theodor Freiherr von und zu Guttenberg (Note: Karl Theodor Freiherr von und zu Guttenberg resigned on 6 June 1972.) | CSU |
| Bavaria | List | | Ignaz Kiechle | CSU |
| Bavaria | List | | Gisbert Kley | CSU |
| Bavaria | List | | Reinhold Kreile | CSU |
| Bavaria | List | | Edeltraud Kuchtner | CSU |
| Bavaria | List | | Erich Riedl | CSU |
| Bavaria | List | | Hans Roser | CSU |
| Bavaria | List | | Oscar Schneider | CSU |
| Bavaria | List | | Karl-Heinz Spilker | CSU |
| Bavaria | List | | Jürgen Warnke | CSU |
| Bavaria | List | | Erich Ziegler | CSU |
| Bavaria | List | | Albert Schedl (Note: Albert Schedl took office on 7 January 1971, to succeed Franz Xaver Unertl.) | CSU |
| Bavaria | List | | Fritz Wittmann (Note: Fritz Wittmann took office on 6 September 1971, to succeed Wolfgang Pohle.) | CSU |
| Bavaria | List | | Roland Cantzler (Note: Roland Cantzler took office on 7 June 1972, to succeed Karl Theodor Freiherr von und zu Guttenberg.) | CSU |
| Bavaria | List | | Herbert Prochazka (Note: Herbert Prochazka took office on 18 September 1972, to succeed Valentin Dasch.) | CSU |
| Bavaria | List | | Otto Menth (Note: Otto Menth took office on 19 September 1972, to succeed Georg Ehnes.) | CSU |
| Bavaria | List | | Josef Ertl | FDP |
| Bavaria | List | | Albrecht Haas (Note: Albrecht Haas died on 20 January 1970.) | FDP |
| Bavaria | List | | Hansheinrich Schmidt | FDP |
| Bavaria | List | | Heinz Starke | FDP |
| Bavaria | List | | Karl Geldner (Note: Karl Geldner took office on 26 January 1970, to succeed Albrecht Haas.) | FDP |
| Saarland | 244 | Saarbrücken-Stadt | Günter Slotta | SPD |
| Saarland | 245 | Saarbrücken-Land | Heinrich Draeger | CDU |
| Saarland | 246 | Saarlouis | Josef Schmitt | CDU |
| Saarland | 247 | Ottweiler | Leo Gottesleben | CDU |
| Saarland | 248 | St. Ingbert | Werner Wilhelm | SPD |
| Saarland | List | | Alwin Brück | SPD |
| Saarland | List | | Alwin Kulawig | SPD |
| Saarland | List | | Franz-Lorenz von Thadden | CDU |
| West Berlin | | | Klaus Dieter Arndt | SPD |
| West Berlin | | | Willy Bartsch | SPD |
| West Berlin | | | Reinhard Bühling | SPD |
| West Berlin | | | Roelf Heyen | SPD |
| West Berlin | | | Edith Krappe | SPD |
| West Berlin | | | Harry Liehr (Note: Harry Liehr resigned on 16 July 1971.) | SPD |
| West Berlin | | | Lothar Löffler | SPD |
| West Berlin | | | Kurt Mattick | SPD |
| West Berlin | | | Ernst Schellenberg | SPD |
| West Berlin | | | Marie Schlei | SPD |
| West Berlin | | | Klaus-Peter Schulz | SPD |
| West Berlin | | | Franz Seume | SPD |
| West Berlin | | | Hellmut Sieglerschmidt | SPD |
| West Berlin | | | Ulrich Dübber (Note: Ulrich Dübber took office on 16 July 1971, to succeed Harry Liehr.) | SPD |
| West Berlin | | | Franz Amrehn | CDU |
| West Berlin | | | Ernst Benda (Note: Ernst Benda resigned on 8 December 1971.) | CDU |
| West Berlin | | | Johann Baptist Gradl | CDU |
| West Berlin | | | Georg Kotowski | CDU |
| West Berlin | | | Ernst Lemmer (Note: Ernst Lemmer died on 18 August 1970.) | CDU |
| West Berlin | | | Johannes Müller | CDU |
| West Berlin | | | Liselotte Pieser | CDU |
| West Berlin | | | Jürgen Wohlrabe | CDU |
| West Berlin | | | Karl-Heinz Schmitz (Note: Karl-Heinz Schmitz took office on 20 August 1970, to succeed Ernst Lemmer, but later resigned on 25 August 1971.) | CDU |
| West Berlin | | | Lieselotte Berger (Note: Lieselotte Berger took office on 26 August 1971, to succeed Karl-Heinz Schmitz.) | CDU |
| West Berlin | | | Gerhard Kunz (Note: Gerhard Kunz took office on 13 December 1971, to succeed Ernst Benda.) | CDU |
| West Berlin | | | William Borm | FDP |

== See also ==
- Politics of Germany
- List of Bundestag Members
