= Karl Ludwig Freiherr von und zu Guttenberg =

German anti-Nazi resistance member

Karl Ludwig Freiherr von und zu Guttenberg (22 March 1902 – 23/24 April 1945) was a member of the German anti-Nazi resistance. He was executed in the aftermath of the failure of the 20 July plot to assassinate Adolf Hitler.

The von Guttenberg family originates back to 1149 in Franconia (northern part of Bavaria) in the southern part of Germany. Karl Ludwig Freiherr von und zu Guttenberg studied law and history in Munich and graduated in 1929. In that year he married Therese, Princess Schwarzenberg. They had two daughters and one son.

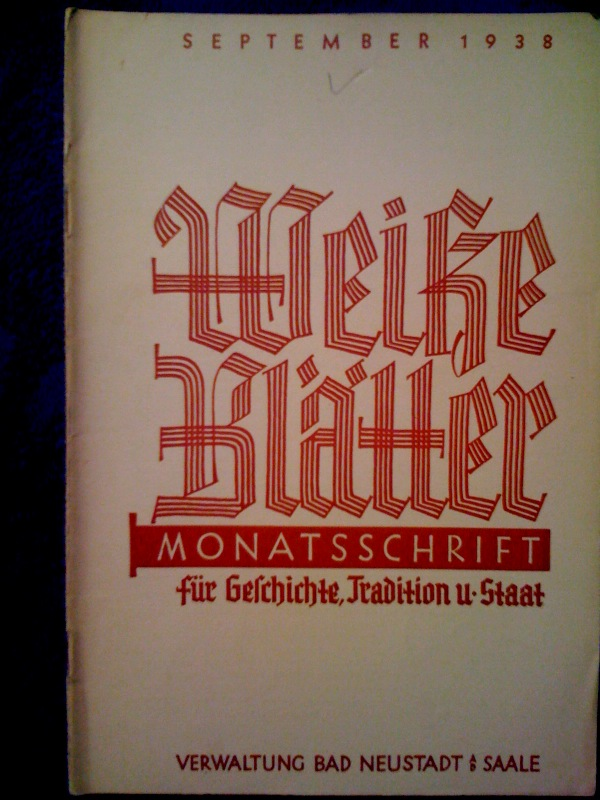
Title page of the White Papers of September 1938

Karl Ludwig von Guttenberg was a Catholic monarchist who started publishing the White Papers; Journals on History, Tradition and State (formerly called Monarchy) in 1934. Amongst its authors were Reinhold Schneider, Jochen Klepper, Ulrich von Hassell and Werner Bergengruen. The White Papers (in German: Weiße Blätter) soon became an important organ and also a meeting place, through their publishers many various contacts, for the conservative opposition against the Nazi regime under Hitler. Karl Ludwig Freiherr von und zu Guttenberg first introduced Carl Goerdeler and Ulrich von Hassell to each other in 1939.

In 1941, von Guttenberg was ordered to work in counterintelligence at the Foreign Affairs Office in Berlin through the help of Ludwig Beck. There, von Guttenberg worked under Admiral Wilhelm Canaris and belonged to the social circle of Hans von Dohnanyi, Justus Delbrück, and Hans Oster.

After the failure of the assassination attempt on Adolf Hitler on 20 July 1944, von Guttenberg was arrested by the Gestapo and interrogated under torture, apparently without result and he revealed no names of members of the resistance.

In the night between the 23 and 24 of April in 1945, Karl Ludwig von und zu Guttenberg was murdered by order of Gestapo chief Heinrich Müller.

The late politician and anti-Nazi resistance activist Karl Theodor Freiherr von und zu Guttenberg was his nephew and the latter's son Enoch zu Guttenberg was a conductor and father of politician and businessman Karl-Theodor zu Guttenberg.
