= Karl-Theodor zu Guttenberg =

German businessman, journalist, podcaster and politician (born 1971)

Karl-Theodor zu Guttenberg Bundesminister a. D.
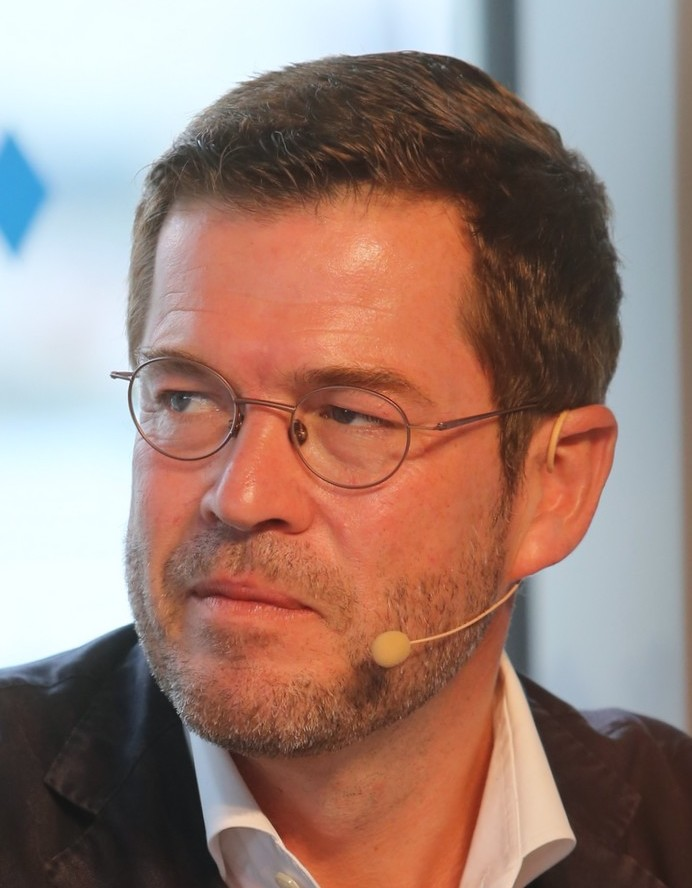
- Guttenberg in 2017

Minister of Defence
- In office 28 October 2009 – 1 March 2011
- Chancellor: Angela Merkel
- Preceded by: Franz Josef Jung
- Succeeded by: Thomas de Maizière

Minister for Economic Affairs and Technology
- In office 10 February 2009 – 27 October 2009
- Chancellor: Angela Merkel
- Preceded by: Michael Glos
- Succeeded by: Rainer Brüderle

Secretary General of the Christian Social Union
- In office 3 November 2008 – 10 February 2009
- Leader: Horst Seehofer
- Preceded by: Christine Haderthauer
- Succeeded by: Alexander Dobrindt

Member of the Bundestag; for Kulmbach
- In office 17 October 2002 – 3 March 2011
- Preceded by: Bernd Protzner
- Succeeded by: Emmi Zeulner (2013)

Personal details
- Born: Karl-Theodor Maria Nikolaus Johann Jacob Philipp Joseph Sylvester Buhl-Freiherr von und zu Guttenberg; 5 December 1971 (age 54) Munich, West Germany
- Party: Christian Social Union
- Spouse: Stephanie von Bismarck-Schönhausen (m. 2000; div. 2025)
- Domestic partner: Katherina Reiche
- Children: 2
- Parents: Enoch zu Guttenberg; Christiane zu Eltz
- Relatives: Guttenberg family
- Education: University of Bayreuth; University of Southampton

Military service
- Allegiance: Germany
- Branch: Bundeswehr
- Service years: 1991–1992
- Rank: Stabsunteroffizier der Reserve
- Unit: Army (Heer) / Gebirgsjägerbrigade 23

Karl-Theodor Maria Nikolaus Johann Jacob Philipp Franz Joseph Sylvester Buhl-Freiherr von und zu Guttenberg (born 5 December 1971), known professionally as Karl-Theodor zu Guttenberg, is a German businessman, author, journalist, podcaster, and former politician of the Christian Social Union (CSU). He served as a member of the Bundestag from 2002 to 2011, as Secretary-General of the CSU from 2008 to 2009, as Federal Minister for Economics and Technology in 2009 and as Federal Minister of Defence from 2009 to 2011.

After the discovery of extensive plagiarism in his doctoral dissertation and the decision of the University of Bayreuth to revoke his doctorate, an affair known as the Guttenberg plagiarism scandal, he resigned from all political posts in March 2011.

In 2011, Guttenberg joined the Center for Strategic and International Studies (CSIS). Guttenberg is the chairman and a founder of Spitzberg Partners, an advisory and investment firm based in New York City.

== Education ==
In 1991, after finishing high school (Gymnasium) in Rosenheim, Guttenberg completed his mandatory military service reaching the rank of Sergeant. Guttenberg studied law at the University of Bayreuth, where he passed the first legal state examination (said to be the equivalent of a master's degree) in 1999. Guttenberg chose not to pursue the second state examination (the equivalent of a bar exam), and focused on running the Munich-based "Guttenberg GmbH" holding where, along with a few employees, he managed his family's significant assets and various participations. Due to the holding's low revenue and small number of employees, it was said that Guttenberg had exaggerated his business experience. The Guttenberg GmbH had assets under management of at least a quarter billion euros, including a 26.5 percent stake in Rhön-Klinikum AG, which was sold in March 2002 to Bayerische Hypo- und Vereinsbank for 260 million euros. From 1996 to 2002, Guttenberg was a member of the board of directors of Rhön-Klinikum AG. Until September 2004, he was a managing director of the KT-Kapitalverwaltung GbR in Munich.

Guttenberg studied law at the University of Bayreuth. He successfully defended his dissertation Verfassung und Verfassungsvertrag. Konstitutionelle Entwicklungsstufen in den USA und der EU (lit. 'Constitution and Constitutional Treaty. Stages of Constitutional Development in the USA and EU'), and was awarded the academic degree Doctor of Law (Doktor der Rechte) in 2007. Following accusations of plagiarism in Guttenberg's dissertation, the University of Bayreuth conducted an investigation, culminating on 23 February 2011 with the revocation of Guttenberg's doctorate.

In 2019, Guttenberg was awarded a Doctor of Philosophy degree from the University of Southampton.

== Political career ==
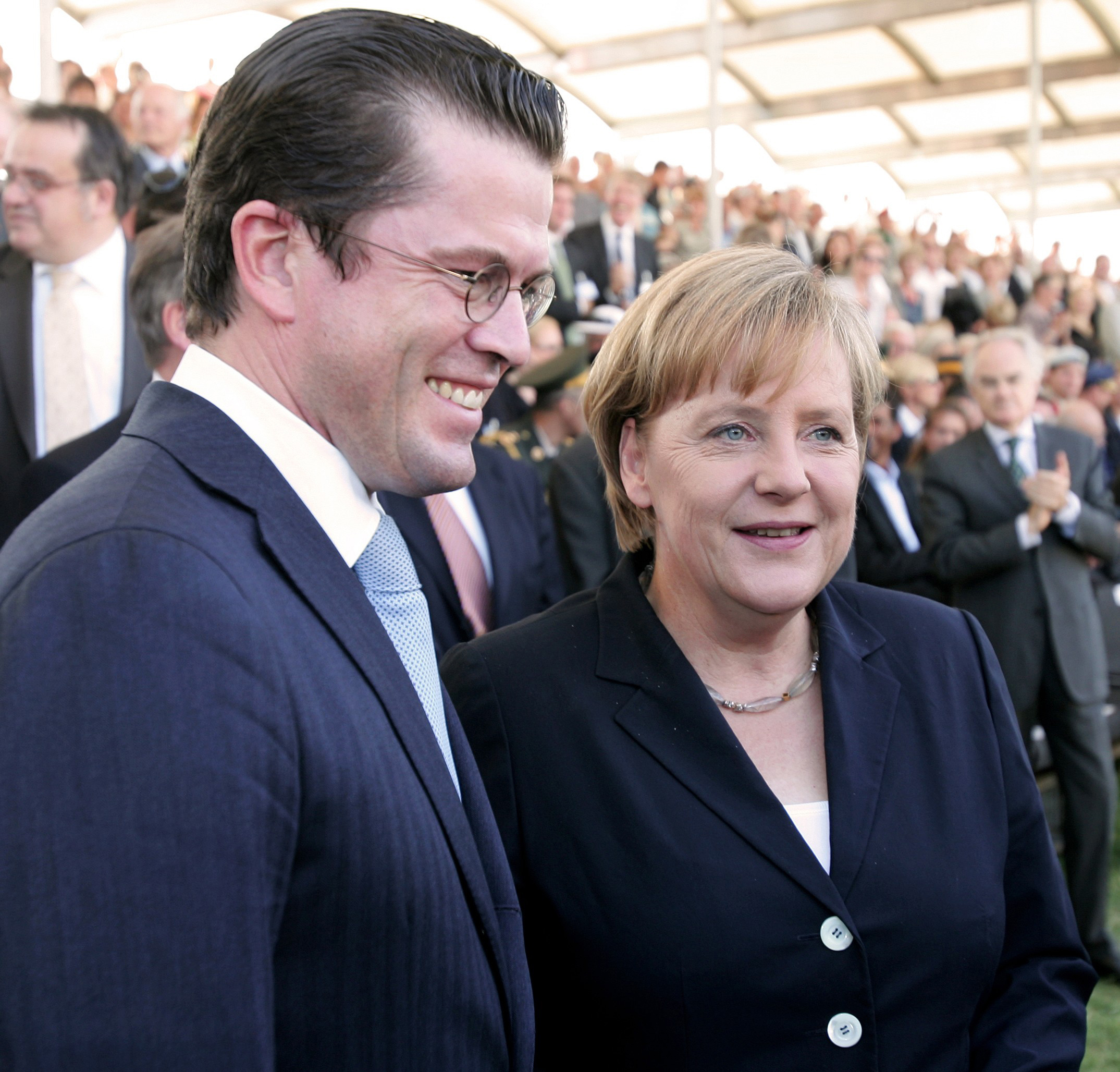
Guttenberg with German Chancellor Angela Merkel, 2010

Guttenberg is a member of the Christian Social Union of Bavaria (CSU) and held different positions within the party, including that of secretary general.

=== Member of Parliament ===
In 2002, Guttenberg was elected to the Bundestag as the representative of Kulmbach. He was reelected in 2005, winning 60.0% of the votes in his constituency. In 2009, he was reelected again with 68.1% of the votes in his district, obtaining the highest percentage of votes of all elected representatives in Germany for that election cycle.

From October 2005 to November 2008, Guttenberg served as chairman of the CDU/CSU parliamentary group in the Bundestag's Foreign Affairs Committee and as spokesman of the CDU/CSU parliamentary group in the Bundestag's Committee on disarmament, non-proliferation and arms control. He also chaired the CSU Foreign Policy Expert Committee and the German-British parliamentary group during that time.

==== Political positions ====
In early 2004, Guttenberg introduced the concept of a Privileged Partnership between Turkey and the European Union as a viable alternative to accession of Turkey to the European Union into the German political discourse. Guttenberg based his opposition to full Turkish membership in the EU on the country's insufficient fulfillment of relevant accession criteria, for example with regard to the Cyprus dispute. At the same time, he stressed the necessity of maintaining good relations with Turkey and was therefore critical of a French initiative to criminalize the denial of the Armenian genocide.

Guttenberg also repeatedly warned of the looming threat posed to German and European security by Iran's nuclear and ballistic missile programs. However, he rejected taking rash military action against Iran and instead called for an international diplomatic effort to deal with Tehran's nuclear program. As a Member of Parliament, he was a strong critic of the far-left party Die Linke, which he accused of links to terrorists. He was also a member of the Europa-Union Parliamentary Group of the German Bundestag and a member of the Board of Trustees of the Foundation Memorial to the Murdered Jews of Europe.

==== Secretary General of the CSU ====
In September 2008, the CSU suffered heavy losses in the Bavarian state election and lost its absolute majority in the Bavarian Landtag for the first time in 46 years. As a result of this political defeat, the CSU party leadership stepped down and Horst Seehofer, the new CSU chairman and minister-president of Bavaria, appointed Guttenberg as secretary general of the CSU in November 2008.

As secretary-general, Guttenberg called for tax cuts, an increase in family benefits and structural reforms within the CSU to foster more direct political participation of the party base. In addition to domestic policy he also emphasized his focus on international affairs.

=== Federal Minister of Economics ===
After the resignation of Michael Glos on 9 February 2009 Guttenberg became Federal Minister of Economics and Technology in the first Merkel cabinet. Guttenberg, the youngest economics minister in the German post-war era, came to office during the 2008 financial crisis and the Great Recession.

During the 2008 financial crisis, several major German banks were near failure, including Hypo Real Estate, which received €102 billion of credit and guarantees from Germany's bank rescue fund. In this case, Guttenberg opposed an overly hasty nationalization of Hypo Real Estate, which he considered only as "ultissima ratio, a measure of the very last resort". A few months later he drafted a legislative proposal to minimize the financial risks of failing banks, which caused controversy but later became the foundation of the German bank restructuring bill.

In the case of troubled German companies asking for state aid, including automaker Opel and now-defunct mail-order service Arcandor/Quelle, Guttenberg was reluctant to commit government resources. He insisted on strict conditionality, including restructuring, and limited support to only those companies which were otherwise competitive but were temporarily affected by the crisis.

In November 2008, Opel had appealed for governmental assistance because of severe financial problems facing its American parent, General Motors (GM). In 2009, Opel employed 25,000 workers in Germany and indirectly supported 50,000 additional jobs through its supplier network. In March 2009, Guttenberg made his first visit to the US as economics minister, focusing his trip on the future of Opel. In his talks with U.S. Treasury Secretary Timothy Geithner, the director of the United States National Economic Council, Lawrence Summers, and Rick Wagoner, then CEO of General Motors, Guttenberg demanded that GM provide a viable restructuring plan for Opel as a precondition for receiving financial assistance from the German state. Guttenberg and Wagoner agreed on the necessity of a private investor for Opel.

After Guttenberg's visit to the US, negotiations between the German government, GM, and potential Opel investors, including Fiat and Canada's Magna International, were stalled by GM and the U.S. Treasury. In contrast to Merkel and other German political leaders, Guttenberg preferred insolvency for Opel rather than the infusion of unconditional financial assistance from the German state. Because of the resultant financial risks to the German state, Guttenberg opposed the sale of Opel to Magna International, favoured by Chancellor Merkel, and—according to media coverage—even offered his resignation over the controversy. The Opel-Magna deal later failed, and Opel remained a subsidiary of GM, who had to reimburse financial assistance to Germany. In the summer of 2009, he surpassed Angela Merkel as the most popular politician in Germany.

=== Federal Minister of Defence ===
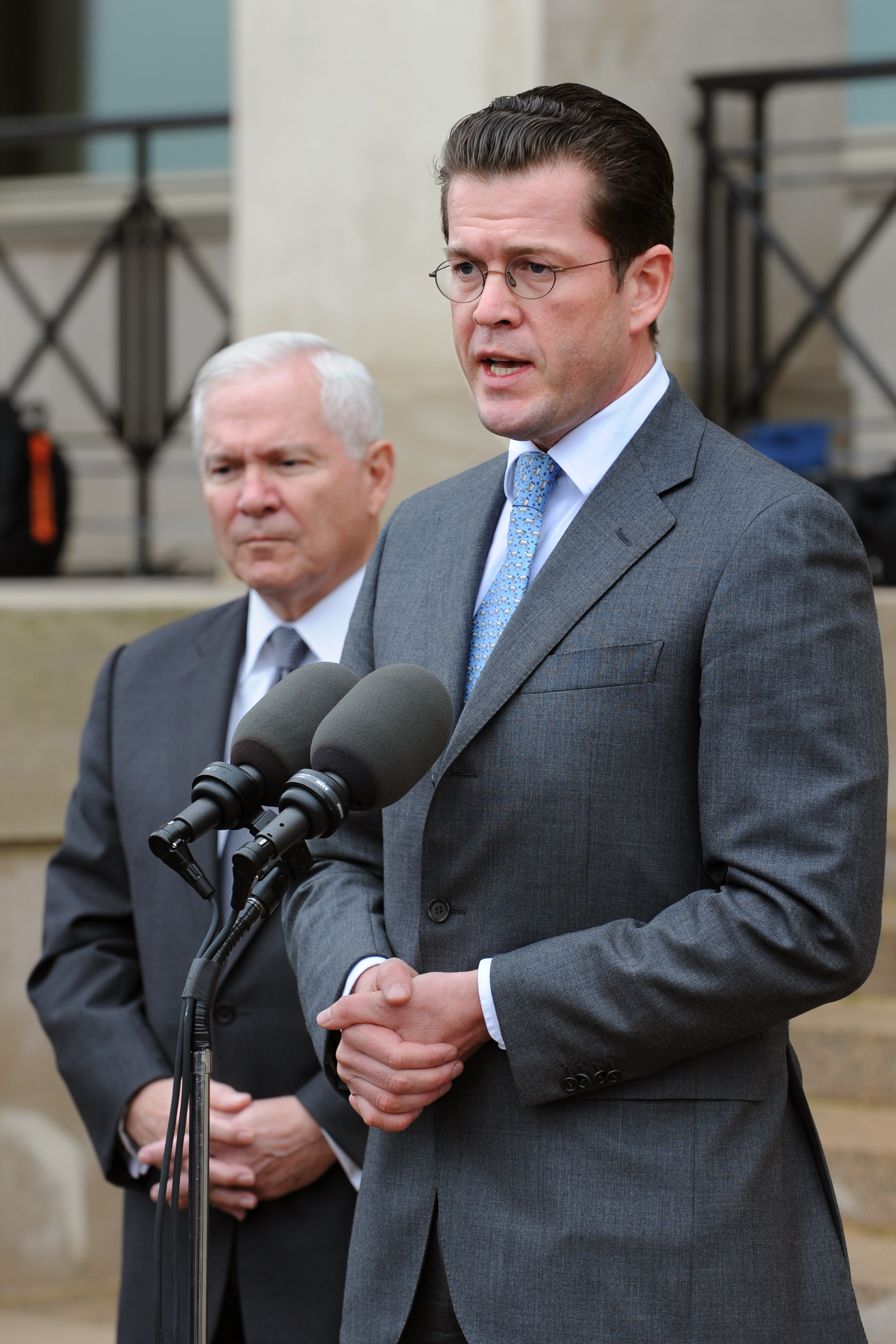
Guttenberg with U.S. Secretary of Defense Robert M. Gates in front of the Pentagon, 2009

The 2009 Bundestag elections led to a change in government, as the incumbent grand coalition of CDU/CSU and SPD was replaced by a center-right coalition of CDU/CSU and FDP.

According to German press reports, Chancellor Merkel offered Guttenberg the choice between the interior and the defence ministries while negotiating the distribution of ministerial posts within the new coalition government. Guttenberg decided to opt for the defence portfolio and took the oath of office on 28 October 2009 as part of the Second Merkel cabinet. He was the youngest-ever German defence minister in the post-war era.

==== Afghanistan ====
The first political challenge facing defence minister Guttenberg was dealing with the Kunduz airstrike of 4 September 2009. Initially, he adopted the position of his predecessor Jung and defended the air strike as "militarily appropriate". However, in contrast to Jung, Guttenberg conceded that the strike had also caused civilian casualties. After Guttenberg had received additional information and investigative reports dating back to the tenure of his predecessor Jung, Guttenberg changed his position concerning the "Kunduz airstrike" and dismissed Bundeswehr Chief of Staff Schneiderhahn and Parliamentary State Secretary of Defence Wichert on 26 November 2009.

Jung, who in the meantime had assumed the position of labor minister in the second Merkel cabinet, took full political responsibility for the delay in sharing relevant Kunduz air strike information and resigned the following day.

At the demand of the opposition parties, the Bundestag subsequently established a special investigative committee to shed light on the defense ministry's communications policy in connection with the Kunduz air strike. The final report of the Bundestag's special investigative committee cleared Guttenberg from the accusation that he had been responsible for the defence ministry's inadequate communications policy following the Kunduz strike. The findings were supported by members from the ruling CDU/CSU-FDP coalition while the opposition parties criticized the special investigative committee's report and later published their own account of the investigation.

Shortly after taking office, Guttenberg publicly compared the situation faced by Bundeswehr soldiers in Afghanistan to "war". In doing so, Guttenberg broke a major political taboo since up until then Germany's political leadership – including the Chancellor and previous defense ministers – had only referred to the Afghanistan intervention as a "stabilization deployment". The new classification of the Bundeswehr's Afghanistan deployment as "war" improved the legal status of German soldiers operating under international law.

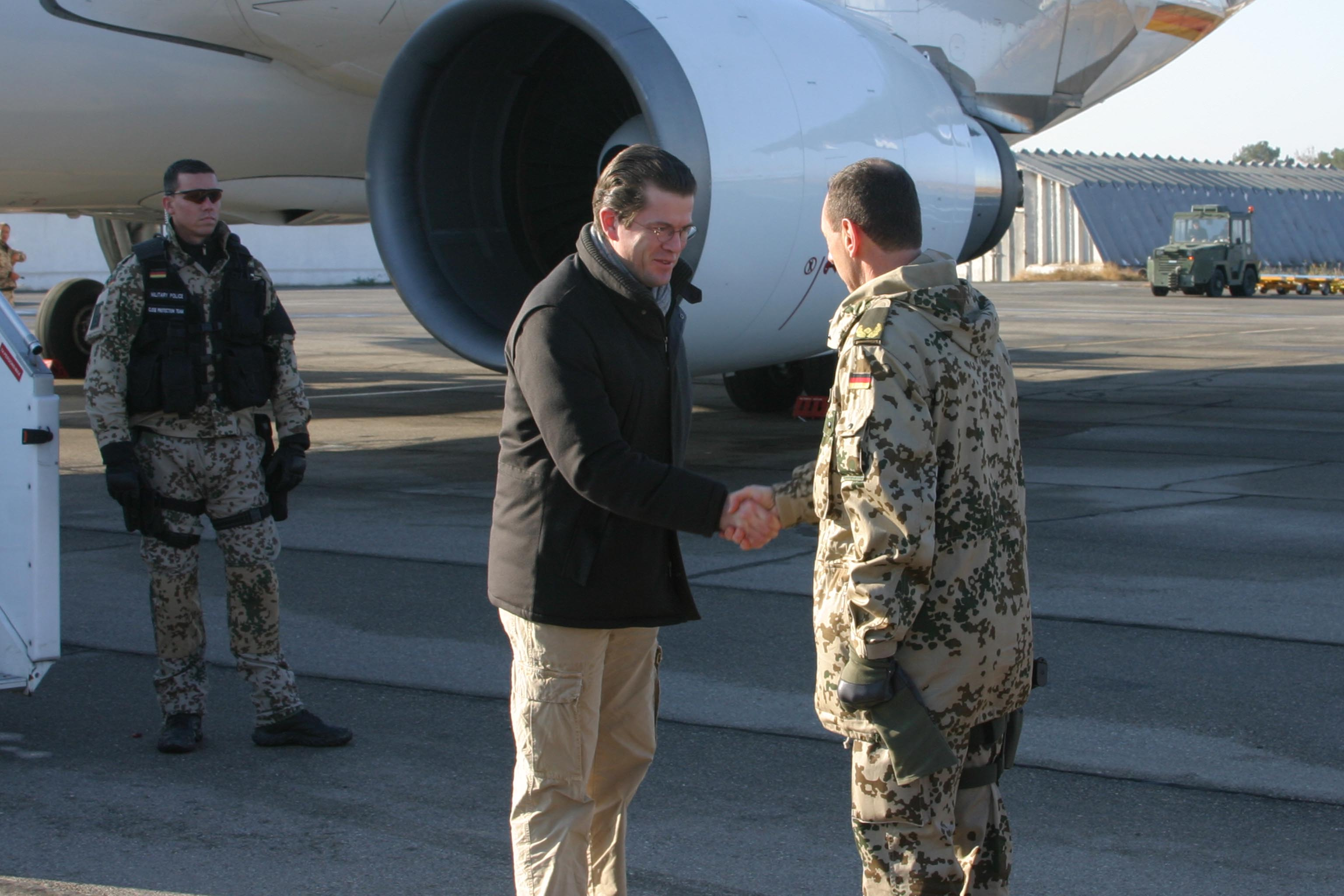
Guttenberg in Kunduz Province in December 2009

Guttenberg attempted to elevate public perception of Germany's Afghan mission by personally participating – sometimes along with the Chancellor – at funeral services held for fallen Bundeswehr soldiers. In November 2010, Guttenberg established the Combat Action Medal of the Bundeswehr, which is awarded for bravery in combat and to soldiers who were the targets of terrorist or military attacks.

At the political level, Guttenberg spoke out strongly against a military withdrawal from Afghanistan. He specifically warned against imposing fixed troop withdrawal timetables that do not take into account the security situation on the ground. Furthermore, Guttenberg also demanded a stronger involvement of key neighboring states such as Russia, India, and China in the resolution of the Afghan conflict. In light of the traditionally challenging security situation in Afghanistan, Guttenberg called for the development of an internationally coordinated long-term security strategy – based on the use of special forces and close intelligence cooperation within the coalition – to stabilize the country even after the eventual withdrawal of all foreign troops.

During his tenure as defense minister, Guttenberg made nine visits to Afghanistan and the German soldiers deployed there. To gain a first-hand understanding of the situation on the ground and the military risks of the Bundeswehr's mission, Guttenberg went several times to the frontlines of the Afghan conflict. He also invited journalists to accompany him on these trips in an effort to educate the wider German public about the nature of the Bundeswehr deployment in Afghanistan. In December 2010, Guttenberg traveled to Afghanistan along with his wife Stephanie to visit with the troops before the Christmas holidays. In addition, he was also accompanied by German TV moderator Johannes B. Kerner, who hosted his prime-time talk show at the Bundeswehr camp in Mazar-i-Sharif featuring the Guttenbergs and German soldiers deployed there. While other German media and the opposition parties sharply criticized Guttenberg for allowing Kerner to host his show in Afghanistan, the reaction by the German troops and the general public was predominantly positive.

==== Bundeswehr reform ====
In early 2010, Guttenberg decided to push for fundamental Bundeswehr reforms in an effort to address the structural deficits within the German armed forces and to deal with declining defense budgets. The overall goal was to boost the Bundeswehr's expeditionary capabilities while, at the same time, achieving cost reductions. To accomplish these reforms, Guttenberg proposed to reduce the armed forces to 165,000 active duty soldiers and to suspend the draft, resulting in the most comprehensive restructuring of the Bundeswehr since its founding in 1955. Guttenberg's reform plans were supported by a blue-ribbon "Bundeswehr Structural Commission" that the minister created in April 2010. The proposals triggered a major debate about the country's draft system and were met with significant political opposition, not least in Guttenberg's own political party. In the end, Guttenberg's view won out and on 29 October 2010, the CSU general party convention approved the minister's motion to suspend the draft by a large majority. Several weeks later, Chancellor Merkel's CDU held its own party convention and also voted in favor of suspending the draft. In November 2010, a United States diplomatic cables leak revealed that American diplomats viewed Guttenberg positively, with one cable describing him as a "foreign policy expert, a transatlanticist and a close and well-known friend to the United States".

=== Plagiarism scandal and resignation ===
In 2011, Guttenberg resigned amid controversy over the doctoral dissertation he submitted at the University of Bayreuth, after the first accusations of plagiarism became public in February 2011. Guttenberg's dissertation, Verfassung und Verfassungsvertrag (lit. 'Constitution and Constitutional Treaty'), had been the basis of his 2007 doctorate from the University of Bayreuth. Guttenberg at first denied intentional plagiarism, calling the accusations "absurd," but acknowledged that he may have made errors in his footnotes. In addition, it emerged that Guttenberg had requested a report from the Bundestag's research department, which he had then inserted into his dissertation without attribution. On 23 February 2011, Guttenberg apologized in parliament for flaws in his dissertation, but denied intentional deception and denied the use of a ghostwriter.

On 23 February 2011, the University of Bayreuth rescinded Guttenberg's doctorate. In part due to the expressions of confidence by Angela Merkel, the scandal continued to evoke heavy criticism from prominent academics, legal scholars (who accused Guttenberg of intentional plagiarism), and politicians both in the opposition and in the governing coalition. On 1 March 2011, Guttenberg announced his resignation as Minister of Defense, from his seat in the Bundestag, and from all other political offices.

In May 2011, a University of Bayreuth commission tasked with investigating Guttenberg's dissertation came to the conclusion that Guttenberg had engaged in intentional deception in the writing of his dissertation, and had violated standards of good academic practice. The commission found that he had included borrowed passages throughout his dissertation without citation, and had modified those passages in order to conceal their origin.

In November 2011, the prosecution in Hof discontinued the criminal proceedings for copyright violations against Guttenberg on condition of Guttenberg paying €20,000 to a charity. The prosecutor found 23 prosecutable copyright violations in Guttenberg's dissertation, but estimated that the material damage suffered by the authors of those texts was marginal.

The scandal also led to scrutiny of other politicians' doctorates, notably that of his colleague in the federal cabinet Annette Schavan and Hungarian President Pál Schmitt, who lost their doctorates for similar reasons.

=== 2017 German federal election ===
Guttenberg returned to German politics by making a speech during the 2017 German federal election in which he hailed Chancellor Angela Merkel. The speech was widely reported on in German media and described as marking his comeback in German politics. Guttenberg also said Germany should preserve its relationship with the United States in order to renew the ties after the end of the Trump era, noting that "they won't forget it if, at a time when they were being mocked by the whole world, we maintained contacts with them and said this relationship is important now and will remain so in future." Guttenberg himself has always ruled out the possibility of a comeback.

== Career after politics ==
In September 2011, Guttenberg joined the Washington-based Center for Strategic and International Studies (CSIS). At the Halifax International Security Forum in November 2011, Guttenberg made his first public appearance since joining CSIS. During a plenary session on the Great Recession, he voiced pessimism about the current state of the EU and decried a severe "crisis of political leadership".

In November 2011, Guttenberg published the book Vorerst gescheitert (lit. 'Failed for Now'). The publication is based on a series of conversations with the editor-in-chief of Die Zeit, Giovanni di Lorenzo, in which Guttenberg talks extensively for the first time about his political career, the plagiarism scandal and his resignation, as well as his plans for the future. Guttenberg's criticism in the book of the direction which the CSU is headed sparked some controversy within his party.

Since 2013, he has been a member of the International Advisory Board of Barrick Gold Corporation.

Guttenberg is a strong critic of Russian president Vladimir Putin's expansionist foreign policy. In Spring 2014, he decried an "astonishing leadership vacuum in the world" and demanded that the West, and especially Europe, respond to Moscow's aggressions with strong political action. He praised Chancellor Merkel for her firm stance against Putin. Guttenberg appeared together with Henry Kissinger during a CNN interview about the Russo-Ukrainian war and explained the significant domestic political resistance that Merkel's Russia policy faced in Germany. Several months later Guttenberg accused the EU of inaction and a lack of capabilities given the crises in Ukraine and the Middle East.

Since July 2014, he has also been an advisor to Ripple Labs.

In October 2015, former CSU chairman Horst Seehofer appointed Guttenberg to his competence team for the election campaign. He has also been advising Deutsche Lufthansa on innovation issues since 2015.

At Edelman, he was initially a founding member of the Global Advisory Board, established in 2018, and was later appointed to the Board of Directors. He is also a board member of the Institute for Strategic Dialogue (ISD).

Guttenberg is a member of the advisory board of Renew Democracy Initiative, a non-partisan organization founded in 2017.

In 2022, Guttenberg signed a contract with RTL Television. His documentary on Vladimir Putin, "KT Guttenberg − Auf den Spuren der Macht Der Fall Putin", was broadcast on RTL+ in autumn 2022 and then on n-tv on 12 December 2022. A second programme, "KT Guttenberg − Um Gottes Willen? Die Macht der Kirche in Deutschland" was broadcast on n-tv in January 2024.

In December 2022, he co-hosted the annual review "Menschen, Bilder, Emotionen" with Thomas Gottschalk.

Since 2023, there is a weekly podcast with Gregor Gysi called "Gysi gegen Guttenberg – Der Deutschland-Podcast". In September 2024, a book based on their joint podcast was published entitled „Gysi gegen Guttenberg: Gespräche über die Zeit, in der wir leben“.

In October 2023, Guttenberg published his book „3 Sekunden – Notizen aus der Gegenwart“, in which he shares his thoughts on everyday observations. These are based on posts he had previously published on LinkedIn. In August 2025, the book „3 Worte – Neue Notizen aus der Gegenwart“ was published. Since the end of 2023, several articles by Guttenberg have been published in Focus magazine.

In 2013, Guttenberg formed Spitzberg Partners LLC, a consulting and investment company. In September 2014, Spitzberg Partners and Canadian Acasta Capital founded Atlantic Advisory Partners (AAP), a partnership to promote business and trade between Canada and the European Union in connection with the Comprehensive Economic and Trade Agreement (CETA).

Guttenberg invests in several companies through New York-based Spitzberg Partners.

He is reported by Intelligence Online to help German and European companies to enter the U.S. market. His firm Spitzberg Partners works with private and government entities (such as the state of Delaware in the Global Delaware project).

One of his investments is the government and defense procurement company Govradar, founded by Bundeswehr reserve officer and former Palantir employee Sascha Goyk. Due to Guttenberg's former government positions and his partner Katherina Reiche's current role in the government, the investment has been discussed by German media as a possible case of conflict of interests.

In 2022, Guttenberg co-founded the production company Open Minds Media GmbH, in which Dominik Wichmann and Klaus Brinkbäumer, among others, hold shares. In 2026, Open Minds Media launched the GUTTENBERG media brand, whose publications include the newsletter "NEULAND Update" and the podcasts "Land in Sicht" and "Make America Good Again". Open Minds Media also produced the ARD documentary “'Westerwelle”' about Guido Westerwelle, directed by Jobst Knigge.

== Family and personal life ==
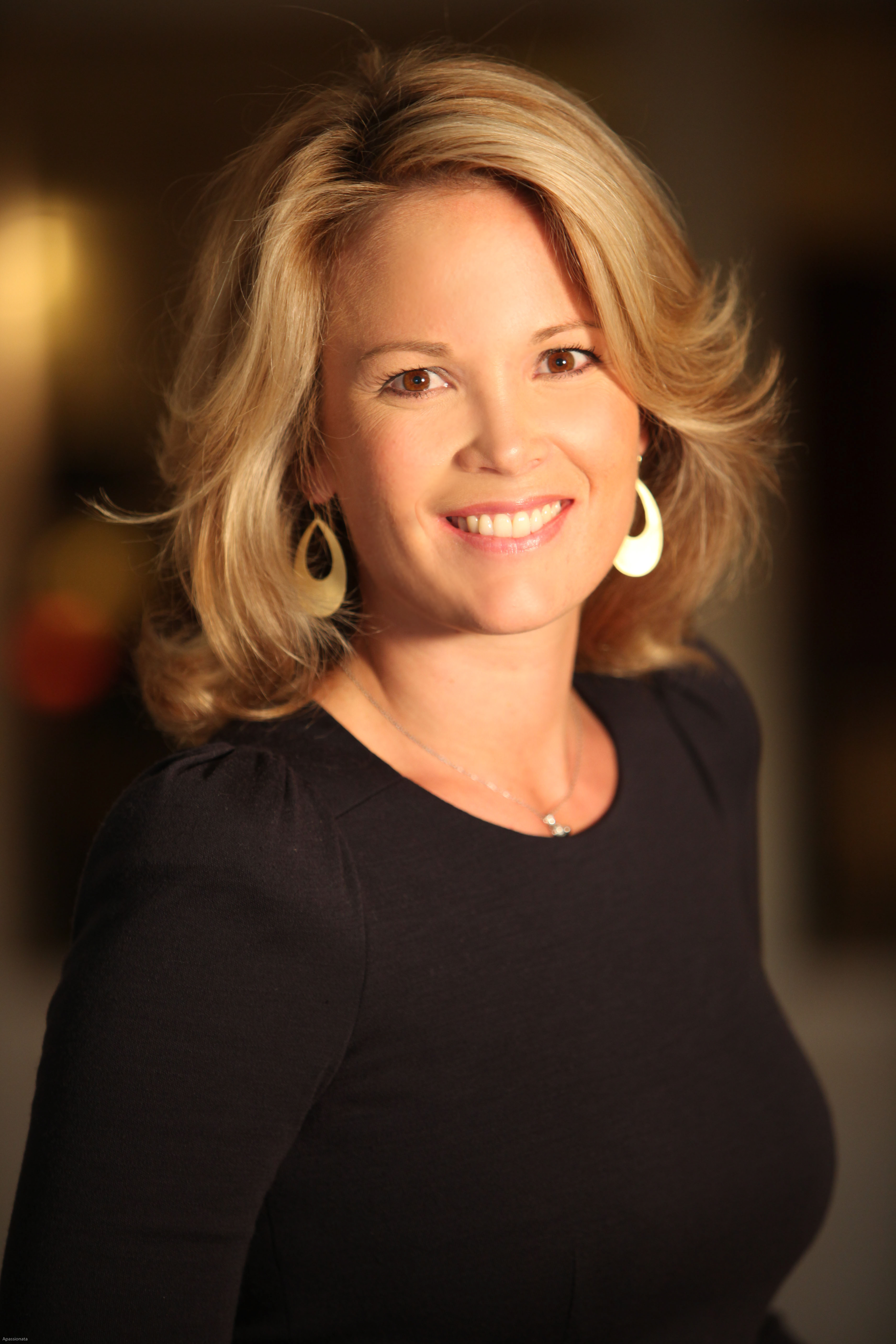
Stephanie zu Guttenberg, née Gräfin von Bismarck-Schönhausen, the ex-wife of Guttenberg (2010)

Guttenberg is a member of the House of Guttenberg, first documented in 1158, and conferred the rank of baron by the Holy Roman Emperor in 1700. Since the adoption of Germany's 1919 Weimar Constitution, which abolished the nobility's privileges, "noble titles form part of the name only".

His grandfather, Karl Theodor Freiherr von und zu Guttenberg (1921–1972), was a CSU politician and hard-line conservative during the Cold War, noted for his opposition to the Ostpolitik. During the Second World War, he narrowly escaped execution after refusing to kill Jews, stating that he would rather shoot SS members. Several other members of Guttenberg's family also offered resistance to the Nazi regime, among them his great-grandfather Georg Enoch Freiherr von und zu Guttenberg, and Karl Ludwig Freiherr von und zu Guttenberg, a great-great-uncle of Guttenberg. Karl Ludwig was a Catholic monarchist, who prior to the Second World War published the "Weiße Blätter" (White Papers), an important publication of the conservative opposition to the Nazi regime. He belonged to the circle of anti-Hitler conspirators around Hans von Dohnányi, Justus Delbrück, and Hans Oster. After the failure of the 20 July plot he was arrested and later executed. His grandmother, Rosa Sophie Prinzessin von Arenberg (1922–2012), was a member of the House of Arenberg.

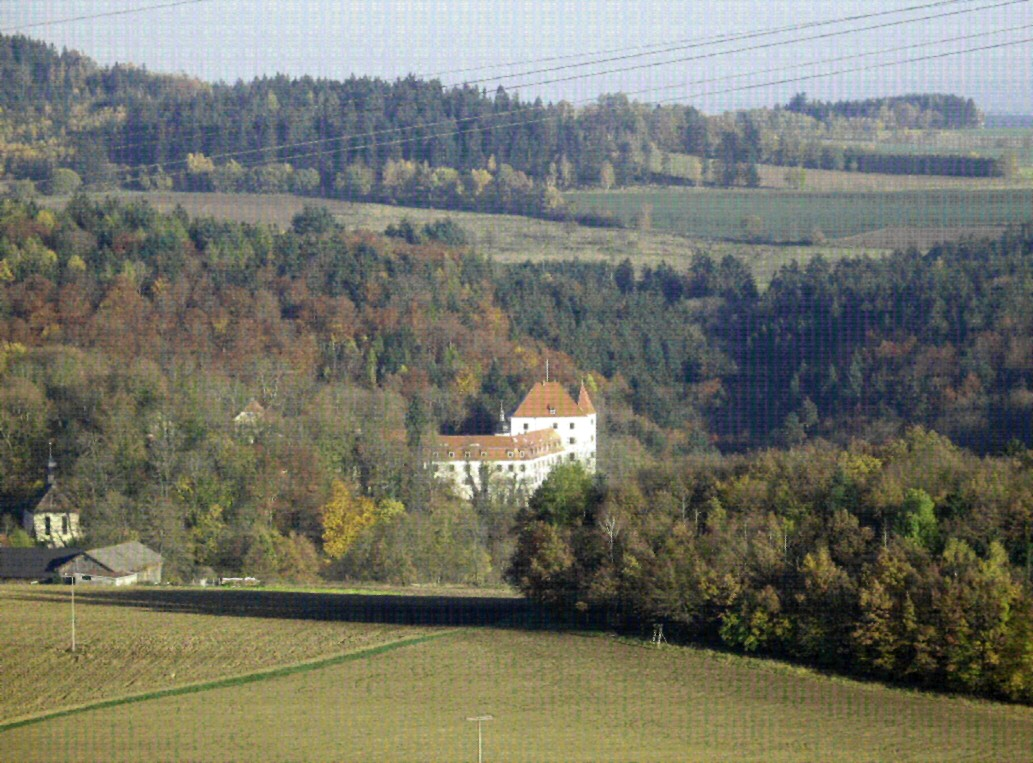
The family castle in Guttenberg, Bavaria

Guttenberg was born in Munich. He lived at his family castle in Guttenberg, Bavaria (district of Kulmbach), a village whose history is closely associated with the House of Guttenberg, and in a mansion in a refined part of Berlin, Berlin-Westend. The castle has been in the possession of the Guttenberg family since 1482. In September 2011, it became known that Guttenberg had bought a house for his family in Greenwich, Connecticut, close to New York City.

Guttenberg's father was Enoch zu Guttenberg, a conductor, who has been decorated with the Order of Merit of the Federal Republic of Germany (Officer's Cross) as well as the Bavarian Order of Merit. He has received many awards for his contributions to classical music, including the German Cultural Award and the Echo Klassik award. Previously, Enoch zu Guttenberg also owned the winery estate Weingut Reichsrat von Buhl.

Guttenberg's mother, Christiane zu Eltz is a member of the Eltz family, which has strong ties with Croatia. She is the daughter of Ludwine, Countess Pejacsevich de Verocze. Her father was Jakob von und zu Eltz, a former President of the Association of Winemakers in Rheingau who became active in Croatian politics after Croatian independence. She divorced Enoch zu Guttenberg in 1977, and Karl-Theodor grew up with his father. His mother married secondly Adolf Richard Barthold von Ribbentrop, owner of an Eltville art gallery and son of Joachim von Ribbentrop, in 1985, and has two children from her second marriage. Guttenberg has a younger brother, Philipp Franz zu Guttenberg (born 1973), who married a daughter of Godfrey Macdonald, 8th Baron Macdonald.

In February 2000, Guttenberg married Stephanie Gräfin von Bismarck-Schönhausen (born on 24 November 1976), a great-great-granddaughter of the first Chancellor of Germany Otto von Bismarck.They have two daughters. In September 2023, it was announced that the couple had separated at the end of 2022. In April 2025, the court officially divorced them. Guttenberg is Catholic. Since 2024, Guttenberg has been in a relationship with Katherina Reiche, who was appointed Federal Ministry for Economic Affairs and Energy in May 2025.

He is a close friend of German-American entrepreneur Peter Thiel.

== Awards ==
Guttenberg was awarded the "Politikaward" in 2009, which is a German "Politician of the Year" award. It was awarded by politik & kommunikation, a German periodical for political communications.

In 2010, the German news magazine Focus named him "Man of the Year".

In 2011, the Carneval Association of Aachen awarded him the "Order Against Dead Seriousness" (German: Orden wider den tierischen Ernst), although he did not attend the ceremony in person, sending instead his younger brother.

== Selected publications ==
=== Books ===
- zu Guttenberg, Karl-Theodor; di Lorenzo, Giovanni (2011). Vorerst gescheitert – Karl-Theodor zu Guttenberg im Gespräch mit Giovanni di Lorenzo [Failed for Now – Karl-Theodor zu Guttenberg in Conversation with Giovanni di Lorenzo] (in German). Freiburg im Breisgau: Verlag Herder. ISBN 978-3-451-30584-9.
- zu Guttenberg, Karl-Theodor (2010). Die Idee vom Staatsbürger in Uniform. Lehren aus dem 20. Juli 1944 [The Idea of the Citizen in Uniform: Lessons from July 20th 1944] (in German). Sankt Augustin: Konrad Adenauer Foundation. ISBN 978-3-941904-75-0.
- zu Guttenberg, Karl-Theodor (2009). Verantwortung in der sozialen Marktwirtschaft [Responsibility in the Social Market Economy] (in German). Stuttgart: Robert Bosch Stiftung. ISBN 978-3-939574-18-7.
- Altomonote, Carlo; Defraigne, Pierre; Delattre, Lucas; zu Guttenberg, Karl-Theodor; Goulard, Sylvie; Scharping, Rudolf (2006). Le Partenariat Privilégié, Alternative à l'Adhésion [The Privileged Partnership, an Alternative to Membership]. Note bleue de la Fondation Schuman (in French). Paris, Brussels: Fondation Robert Schuman. ISSN 1761-2233.
- zu Guttenberg, Karl-Theodor (2004). Die Beziehungen zwischen der Türkei und der EU – eine "Privilegierte Partnerschaft [The Relationship between Turkey and the EU – A "Privileged Partnership"] (in German). München: Akademie für Politik und Zeitgeschehen, Hanns-Seidel-Foundation. ISBN 3-88795-274-X.

=== Articles ===
- zu Guttenberg, Karl-Theodor; Gartzke, Ulf (1 November 2016). "A Recipe for Discord". Handelsblatt.
- "Industry 4.0-A Dubious Battle". Handelsblatt Global Edition. 7 March 2016. Archived from the original on 10 April 2016.
- "Welcome to Realpolitik". Handelsblatt. 4 December 2015. Archived from the original on 25 January 2016.
- "Blockchain: Lassen wir die Zukunft von der Kette?" [Blockchain: Do we unleash the future?] (in German). Handelsblatt. 28 November 2015. Archived from the original on 26 January 2016.
- zu Guttenberg, Karl-Theodor; Gartzke, Ulf (2015). "Europas digitale Zukunft" [Europe's digital future] (in German). CIVIS mit Sonde. Archived from the original on 26 January 2016.
- zu Guttenberg, Karl-Theodor; Crosby, John Henry (26 January 2015). "A forgotten witness in the fight against anti-Semitism". Journal Sentinel. Archived from the original on 27 May 2015.
- zu Guttenberg, Karl-Theodor; Stavridis, James G. (21 January 2015). "Who is to Blame". Horizons. Archived from the original on 13 February 2015.
- zu Guttenberg, Karl-Theodor; Barbieri, Pierpaolo (16 December 2014). "Europe's Anti-Austerity Duo". The New York Times. Archived from the original on 24 December 2014.
- "Why Silicon Valley struggles to conquer Europe". Financial Times. 8 December 2014.
- "Saving Transatlantic Ties in Hodies and Suits". Handelsblatt. 25 November 2014. Archived from the original on 19 March 2015.
- "The Return of Europe's Sleepwalkers". The Wall Street Journal. 3 September 2014.
- zu Guttenberg, Karl-Theodor; Werner, Richard A. (18 August 2014). "How Money is Made". Project Syndicate.
- zu Guttenberg, Karl-Theodor; Stronach, Belinda (14 July 2014). "Breathe deep. EU trade is oxygen". The Globe and Mail.
- zu Guttenberg, Karl-Theodor; Gartzke, Ulf (24 April 2013). "The Other Transatlantic Partnership". Project Syndicate.
- zu Guttenberg, Karl-Theodor; Determann, Lothar (7 April 2014). "On War and Peace in Cyberspace: Security, Privacy, Jurisdiction" (PDF). Hastings Constitutional Law Quarterly. Archived from the original (PDF) on 12 August 2014.
- "More of Merkel's mettle would sap Putin's strength". Financial Times. 14 April 2014. Archived from the original on 27 January 2016.
- "From Government to Googlement: How to Protect Data". The Huffington Post. 2 April 2014. Archived from the original on 21 April 2014.
- "It Takes Three To Tango". The American Interest. 12 March 2014. Archived from the original on 24 March 2014.
- zu Guttenberg, Karl-Theodor; Klich, Bogdan (7 March 2014). "Disrupting Putin's Game Plan". Project Syndicate. Archived from the original on 25 March 2014.
- zu Guttenberg, Karl-Theodor; Kasparov, Garry (6 January 2014). "Putin Is Basking in an 'Astonishing Leadership Vacuum'". Time. Archived from the original on 8 January 2014.
- "Beyond Lecturing Berlin". New York Times. 26 November 2013.
- "Merkel's American Minders". Project Syndicate. 28 October 2013. Archived from the original on 20 May 2014.
- zu Guttenberg, Karl-Theodor; Gartzke, Ulf (31 August 2013). "Syria Tests Germany's Culture of Reluctance". The New York Times. Archived from the original on 11 August 2019.
- zu Guttenberg, Karl-Theodor; Barbieri, Pierpaolo (19 June 2013). "Trans-Atlantic Trade and Its Discontents". The New York Times.
- zu Guttenberg, Karl-Theodor; Gartzke, Ulf (2 April 2013). "Germany Must Have Israel's Back". The Wall Street Journal. Archived from the original on 27 April 2015.
- "Historic chance grounded by petty politics". Financial Times. 10 October 2012. Archived from the original on 25 October 2016.
- "Revamping the Bundeswehr". The German Times. February 2011. Archived from the original on 27 January 2016.
- "Für eine neue Bundeswehr: einsatzorientiert und zukunftsfähig" [For a New Bundeswehr: Deployment-focused and Forward-looking] (in German). Europäische Sicherheit. January 2011.
- "Auf dem Weg zur Neuausrichtung der Bundeswehr" [On the Path towards a Realignment of the Bundeswehr] (PDF) (in German). Politik&Sicherheit. 24 September 2010. Archived (PDF) from the original on 27 January 2016.
- Guttenberg, Karl-Theodor zu (15 April 2010). "Offener Brief an eine moralische Instanz" [Open Letter to a Moral Authority]. Die Welt (in German). Archived from the original on 18 April 2010.
- "Die Zukunft der NATO − Ihre Strategien und ihre Missionen" [The Future of NATO − Strategies and Mssions] (in German). Europäische Sicherheit. March 2010. Archived from the original on 15 October 2010.
- "Den Wandel gestalten" [Designing the Change] (in German). Europäische Sicherheit. January 2010.
- zu Guttenberg, Karl-Theodor; Picaper, Jean-Paul (2010). "L' Etoile Montante de la Politique Allemande" [The Rising Star of German Politics] (in French). Politique Internationale. Archived from the original on 6 April 2012.
- "Schlanker und effizienter" [Leaner and More Efficient] (in German). Die Welt. 20 November 2009.
- "Wir sollten stolz auf den Widerstand sein" [We Should be Proud of the Resistance] (in German). Bild. 20 July 2009.
- "A new era of accountable capitalism". Financial Times. 24 March 2009.
- "Die Zukunft der transatlantischen Beziehungen" [The Future of Transatlantic Relations] (PDF) (in German). Politische Studien. January–February 2009. Archived from the original (PDF) on 12 August 2011.
- "Das Erbe von Stauffenberg" [Stauffenberg's Legacy]. Die Welt (in German). Welt am Sonntag. 18 January 2009. Archived from the original on 18 January 2009.
- "Was wir von Paris erwarten" [What We Expect from Paris]. Die Welt (in German). 8 June 2008.
- "Partner mit Defiziten" [Partner with Deficits] (in German). Frankfurter Rundschau. 1 April 2008. Archived from the original on 27 January 2016.
- "Europe can limit Iran's nuclear ambitions". Financial Times. 7 February 2008.
- "Genug des Lobs" [Enough of that Praise] (in German). Der Tagesspiegel. 18 January 2008.
- "Afghans Respond Favorably to NATO Efforts in Afghanistan". Atlantische Initiative. 15 January 2008. Archived from the original on 23 September 2015.
- Guttenberg, Karl-Theodor zu (4 February 2007). "Der ganze Balkan gehört zu Europa" [The Whole Balkans Belong to Europe]. Die Welt (in German).
- "Eine Lösung für den Kosovo" [A Solution for Kosovo] (in German). Berliner Zeitung. 18 February 2006.
- "Wider eine ad hoc Politik" [Against an Ad Hoc Policy] (in German). Internationale Politik. June 2005.
- "Preserving Europe : Offer Turkey a 'privileged partnership' instead". The New York Times. 15 December 2004.

Political offices
Preceded by Michael Glos	Federal Minister of Economics and Technology; 2009	Succeeded by Rainer Brüderle
Preceded by Franz Josef Jung	Defence Minister of Germany; 2009–2011	Succeeded by Thomas de Maizière
Party political offices
Preceded by Christine Haderthauer	General Secretary of the Christian Social Union in Bavaria; 2008–2009	Succeeded by Alexander Dobrindt
