= Guttenberg, Bavaria =

Guttenberg
- Municipality
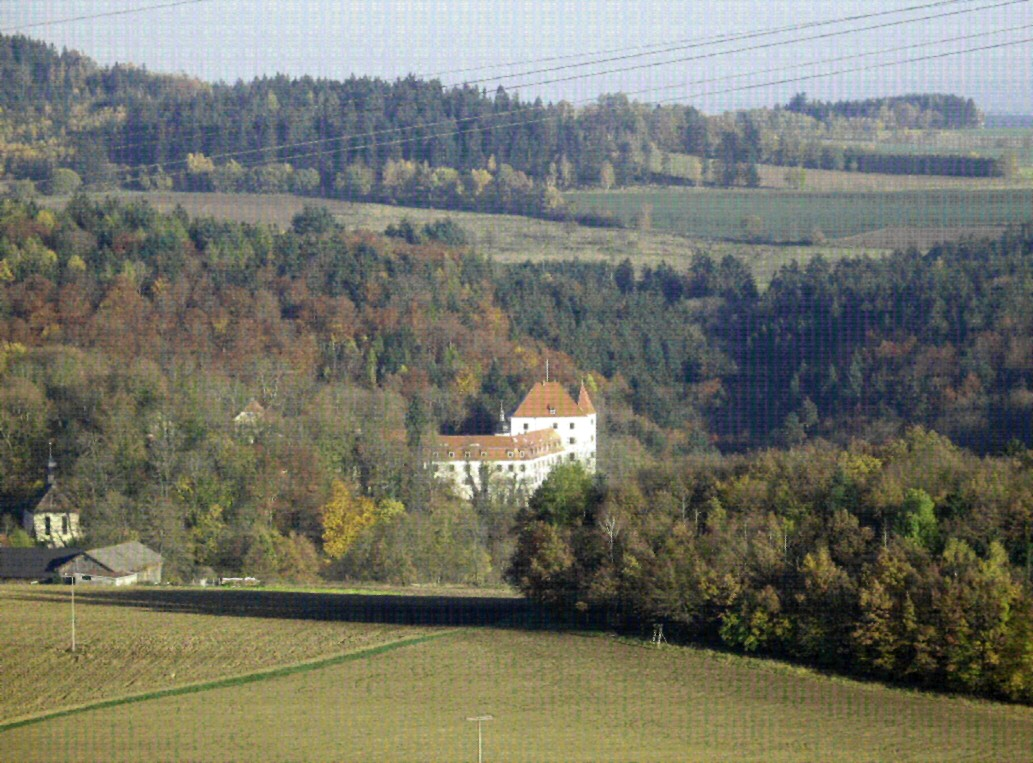
- Guttenberg Castle

- Coat of arms

- Location of Guttenberg within Kulmbach district
- Interactive map of Guttenberg
- Location within Germany Location within Bavaria
- Coordinates: 50°8′N 11°34′E
- Country: Germany
- State: Bavaria
- Admin. region: Oberfranken
- District: Kulmbach
- Municipal assoc.: Untersteinach
- Subdivisions: 14 Ortsteile

Government
  - Mayor (2020–26): Philip Laaber (CSU)

Area
  - Total: 10.66 km^{2} (4.12 sq mi)
- Elevation: 452 m (1,483 ft)

Population (2025-12-31)
  - Total: 459
  - Density: 43.1/km^{2} (112/sq mi)
- Time zone: UTC+01:00 (CET)
  - Summer (DST): UTC+02:00 (CEST)
- Postal codes: 95358
- Dialling codes: 09225
- Vehicle registration: KU
- Website: www.gemeinde-guttenberg.de

Guttenberg (German pronunciation: [ˈɡʊtn̩bɛʁk]) is a municipality in the district of Kulmbach in Bavaria in Germany.

The town is closely tied to House of Guttenberg, who have been associated with the locality since the Middle Ages and still own most of the land in the area.

A landmark in the municipality is the Guttenberg Castle, the seat of the Guttenberg family.

The municipality's coat of arms is derived from that of the Guttenberg family.

== Famous people ==
- Enoch zu Guttenberg (1946–2018), conductor
- Karl-Theodor zu Guttenberg (born 1971), his son, CSU politician and former Federal Minister.

== Neighbourhoods ==
Guttenberg is made up of the following neighbourhoods:

- Breitenreuth
- Buch
- Eeg
- Guttenberg
- Kaltenstauden
- Maierhof
- Messengrund

- Möhrenreuth
- Neuenwirtshaus
- Pfaffenreuth
- Streichenreuth
- Torkel
- Torschenknock
- Vogtendorf
