= House of Guttenberg =

Wealthy Franconian family

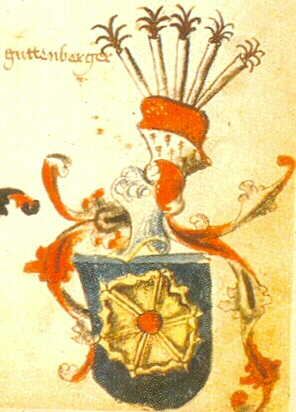
Guttenberg coat of arms (1459)

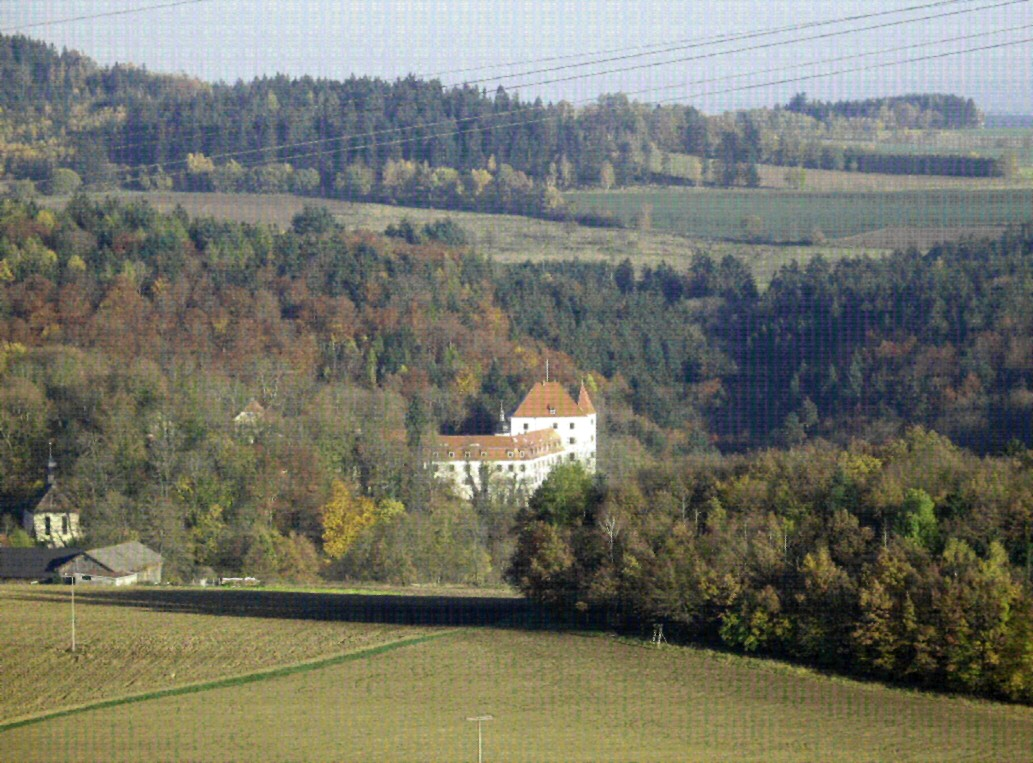
Guttenberg Castle

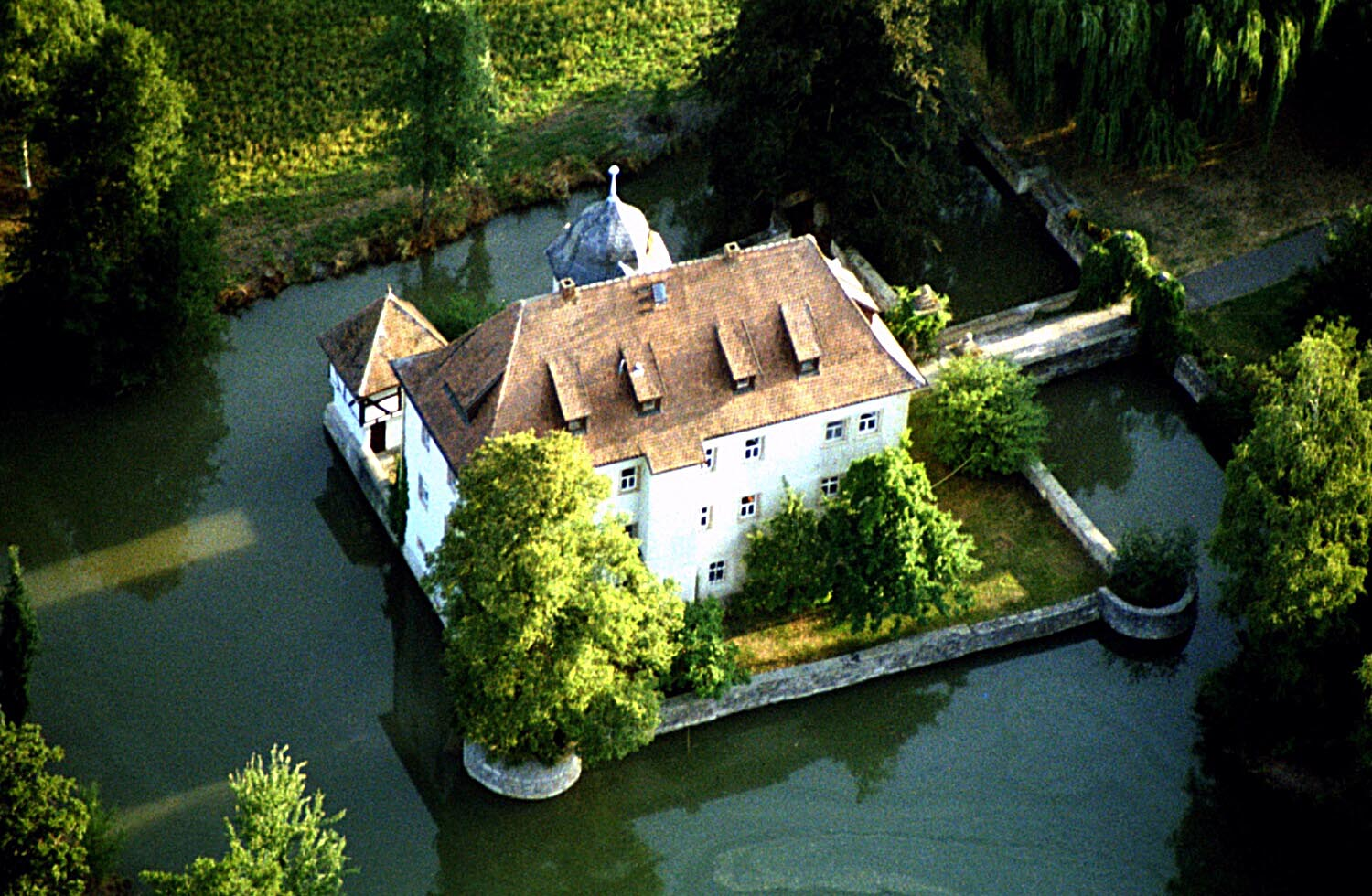
Kleinbardorf Castle, owned by the Guttenberg family from 1691 to 1896

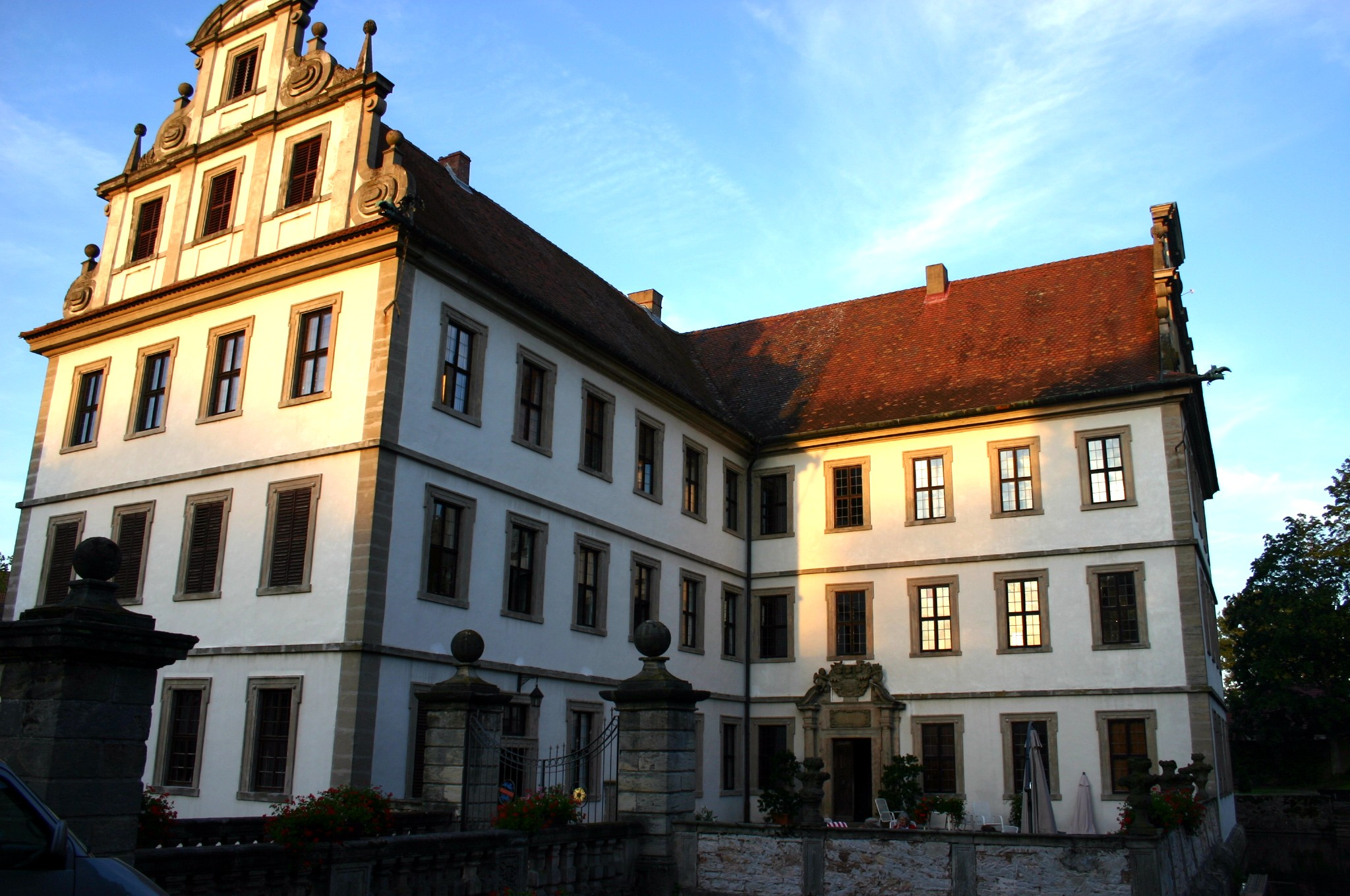
Kirchlauter Palace

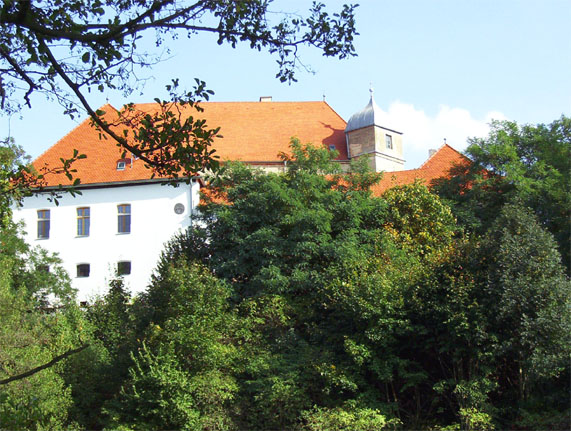
Fronberg Palace

The House of Guttenberg is a prominent wealthy noble Franconian family. It traces its origins back to 1149 with a Gundeloh von Blassenberg (Plassenberg), though the first mention in a document is dated 1158. The name Guttenberg is derived from Guttenberg in present-day Bavaria, and it was adopted by a Heinrich von Blassenberg around 1310.

== History ==
The Plassenberg family members were ministeriales of the Counts of Andechs (later the Dukes of Andechs-Meranien) and used as their seat the Plassenburg of Kulmbach. The castle of Guttenberg remains the main seat of the family.

The family currently consists of two branches: the elder branch, von und zu Guttenberg, and the younger Steinhausen branch. In 1700, the family rose from the rank of Reichsritter (Imperial Knight) to Reichsfreiherr (Baron of the Holy Roman Empire).

After the Holy Roman Empire dissolved, they were given the rank of Freiherr (Baron) of Bavaria (1814 and 1817). According to historian Werner Wagenhöfer, the Guttenberg family is the most researched family of the low nobility in Franconia, along with the Seckendorff and Bibra families.

== Prominent members ==
- Johann Gottfried von Guttenberg, Prince-Bishop of Würzburg (1684–1698)
- Emil Freiherr von Guttenberg (1841–1941), Austrian politician
- Elisabeth Johanna Freifrau von und zu Guttenberg (1900–1998), chair of the Arbeitsgemeinschaft Katholischer Frauen Bayerns
- Karl Ludwig Freiherr von und zu Guttenberg (1902–1945), anti-Nazi activist and Catholic monarchist
- Karl Theodor Freiherr von und zu Guttenberg (1921–1972), German CSU politician
- Enoch zu Guttenberg (1946–2018), conductor
- Karl-Theodor Freiherr von und zu Guttenberg (born 1971), German CSU politician, former Federal Minister of Commerce and Minister of Defense in the first and second Merkel Cabinets
- Philipp Anton Christoph Freiherr von Guttenberg, Domherr of Würzburg

== Localities with the Guttenberg coat-of-arms ==
Coat-of-arms of municipality of Guttenberg

Coat-of-arms of municipality of Kirchlauter

Coat-of-arms of municipality of Sulzdorf an der Lederhecke

Coat-of-arms of municipality of Rugendorf

Coat-of-arms of municipality of Breitbrunn

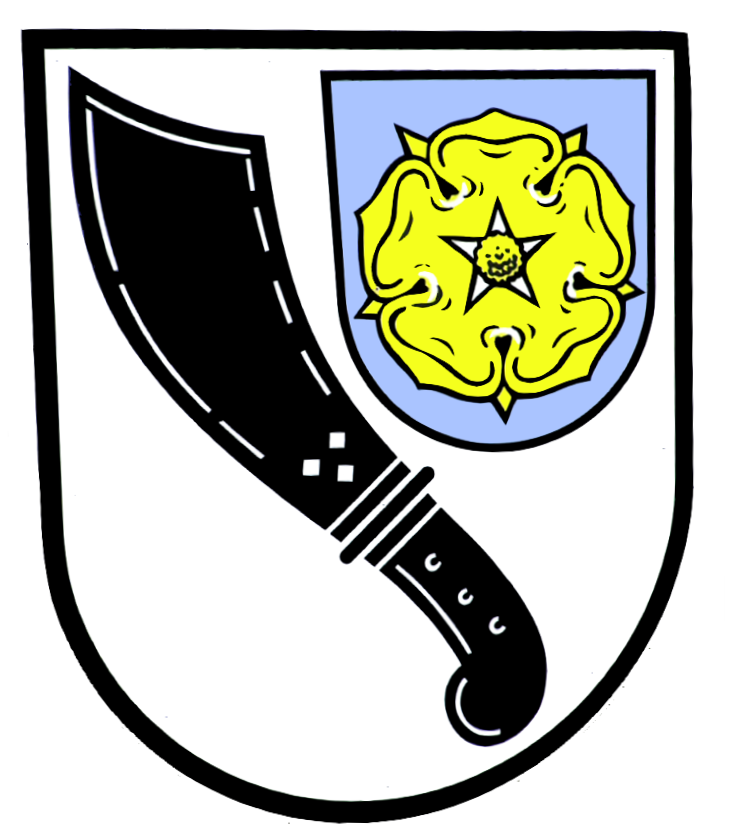
Coat-of-arms of municipality of Bindlach

Coat-of-arms of municipality of Ködnitz
