= Enoch zu Guttenberg =

German conductor

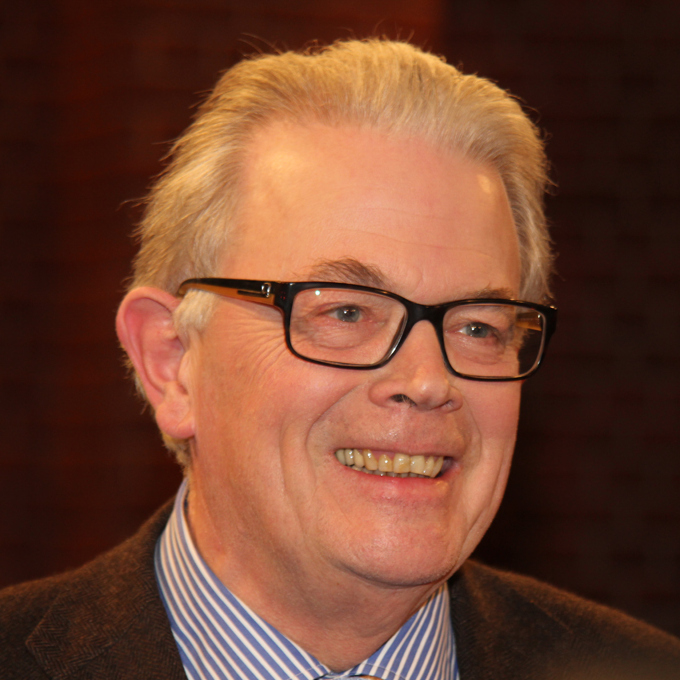
- Enoch zu Guttenberg in 2012
- Born: Georg Enoch Robert Prosper Philipp Franz Karl Theodor Maria Heinrich Johannes Luitpold Hartmann Gundeloh Freiherr von und zu Guttenberg; 29 July 1946; Guttenberg, Bavaria, Germany
- Died: 15 June 2018 (aged 71); Munich, Germany
- Occupations: Conductor; Intendant
- Organizations: Chorgemeinschaft Neubeuern; KlangVerwaltung; BUND; Herrenchiemsee Festival
- Children: Karl-Theodor zu Guttenberg
- Parents: Karl Theodor von und zu Guttenberg; Rosa Sophie Prinzessin von Arenberg
- Awards: Bundesverdienstkreuz; Bayerischer Verdienstorden
- Website: web.archive.org/web/20070925035809/http://www.enochzuguttenberg.de/

Georg Enoch Robert Prosper Philipp Franz Karl Theodor Maria Heinrich Johannes Luitpold Hartmann Gundeloh Freiherr von und zu Guttenberg (29 July 1946 – 15 June 2018) was a German conductor. He also owned the large winery estate Weingut Reichsrat von Buhl. He founded musical ensembles for performances of sacred choral works, and the Herrenchiemsee Festival. In 1975, he co-founded the BUND, a German organization dedicated to protecting the natural environment.

== Career ==
Born in Guttenberg, Bavaria, Germany, on 29 July 1946, he was a member of the House of Guttenberg, and the son of CSU politician Karl Theodor von und zu Guttenberg and Rosa Sophie Prinzessin von Arenberg. He was the father of CSU politician Karl-Theodor zu Guttenberg.

Guttenberg studied composition and conducting in Munich and Salzburg, influenced by Bernhard Paumgartner, Antal Doráti and Karl von Feilitzsch. He founded musical ensembles for performances of sacred choral works. In 1967, he founded the choir Chorgemeinschaft Neubeuern, leading them to international recognition within short time. They appeared at festivals such as the Schwetzingen Festival, the Berliner Festwochen, the Mozartwoche in Salzburg, the Schleswig-Holstein Musik Festival, the Rheingau Musik Festival and the Europäische Wochen Passau. They toured in Europe and South America. Guttenberg focused on sacred choral works such as Bach's St John Passion and St Matthew Passion, and is regarded as a Bekenntnismusiker, performing the works as a personal confession. In a personal style, he combined the knowledge of historically informed performance with modern and vital expressiveness.

From 1981 to 1987, Guttenberg also conducted the Cäcilienverein in Frankfurt. He worked as a guest conductor with orchestras such as NDR Sinfonieorchester, the Deutsche Oper am Rhein, the Mozarteum Orchestra Salzburg, and the MDR Symphony Orchestra. In 1997, Guttenberg co-founded the orchestra KlangVerwaltung. In 2010, he conducted Verdi's Requiem in Rome in honour of Pope Benedict XVI.

In 2001, he founded the Herrenchiemsee Festival, with performances at Schloss Herrenchiemsee, and served as its Intendant. For the opening of 2012 festival, he programmed four Bach cantatas in a dramatiturgical sequence: O Ewigkeit, du Donnerwort, BWV 20, Weinen, Klagen, Sorgen, Zagen, BWV 12, Wahrlich, wahrlich, ich sage euch, BWV 86, and Herr Gott, dich loben alle wir, BWV 130. A reviewer noted music-making in chamber scale, but with spiritual depth and intensity.

In 2017, when his choir celebrated its 50th anniversary, he and the choir received the Rheingau Musik Preis at a Bruckner concert at Eberbach Abbey, performing his Ave Maria, Te Deum and his unfinished Ninth Symphony.

He was politically active in environmental protection, and was in 1975 a co-founder of the BUND, a German organisation dedicated to protecting the natural environment. He left the organisation in 2012.

Guttenberg died in Munich on 15 June 2018 at the age of 71.

== Awards ==
- 1988: Deutscher Kulturpreis
- 1991: Bundesverdienstkreuz 1. Klasse
- 2001: Bayerischer Verdienstorden
- 2008: Echo Klassik (returned in 2018)
- 2017: Rheingau Musik Preis
