= Wilhelm Helms =

German politician (1923–2019)

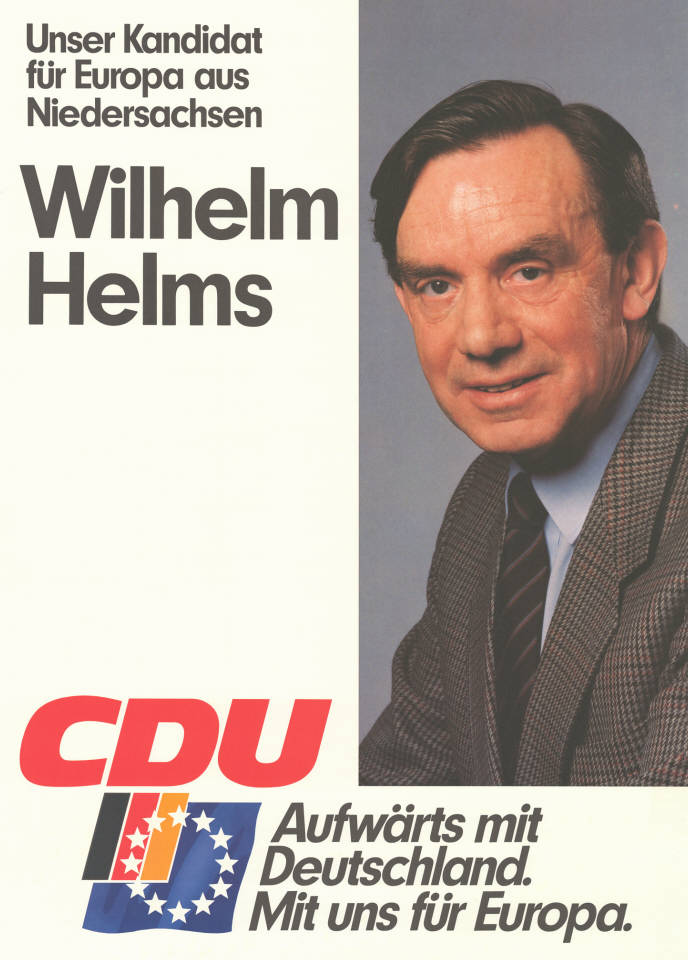
- Wilhelm Helms campaign poster

Member of the Bundestag
- In office 1969–1972

Member of the European Parliament
- In office 17 July 1979 – 23 July 1984

Personal details
- Born: 19 December 1923 Twistringen, Lower Saxony, Germany
- Died: 8 December 2019 (aged 95) Vechta, Lower Saxony, Germany
- Party: German Party; The Free Democratic Party (from 1963)
- Occupation: Politician / Farmer

Wilhelm Helms (19 December 1923 – 8 December 2019) was a German politician. He served as a member of the Bundestag from 1969 to 1972. Helms was notable for his 1972 party switch that threatened to collapse the government of Chancellor Willy Brandt.

== Early life and career ==
Wilhelm Helms was born on 19 December 1923 in the Bissenhausen district of Twistringen, Germany. His father, Heinrich Helms died in 1941 while his brother, Heinrich, was killed in World War II.

After high school, he was drafted into the Wehrmacht. He served in a tank crew on the Russian front and left the army in 1945. He worked his family's farm after the war.

== Political career ==
In 1956, he became involved in politics as a local councilor in his hometown, becoming the mayor in 1961. In 1963, he switched parties to join the Free Democratic Party and become a regional administrator. The party selected him to its list for the 1969 West German federal election and he entered the Bundestag. His Free Democrats entered into a coalition with the Social Democratic Party of Willy Brandt, giving the ruling coalition 251 votes, a majority of three votes.

== 1972 party switch ==
Shortly after the 1972 Baden‐Württemberg state election in which the CDU/CSU won overwhelmingly, Helms announced that he would leave the Free Democrats and apply for membership in the Christian Democratic Union. With the coalition down to 249 members, Helms’ party switch would shift the balance of power in the Bundestag. The opposition proposed a vote of no-confidence in the government to replace Brandt with Rainer Barzel. Helms suggested that he had disagreements over domestic policy and expressed reservations with the governments policy in Eastern Europe. Brandt's government negotiated treaties with the Soviet Union and Poland that would coming for a vote.

At the no-confidence vote, two CDU politicians voted to support Brandt while Helms would not reveal how he had voted. However, he later stated that he would support the vote for the treaties. Helms sat with the CDU for the remainder of his term. In the 1972 West German federal election, he was not re-elected to the Bundestag.

== Later career ==
In 1979, Helms won a seat in the European Parliament from the CDU. He served on the Delegation for relations with Canada, the Committee on Agriculture and the Committee on Transport. He left the European Parliament in 1984.

== Personal life ==
In 1944, he met his wife, Lya Schilmbller, who had been sent to work on the farm. The couple become engaged in 1946 and married in 1948.

In 1990, Helms took issue with Brandt's memoir, which suggested that Helms had a financial motive for switching parties. His suit was unsuccessful.

Helms died on 8 December 2019 in Vechta, Germany at the age of 95.
