= Roland Cantzler =

German politician (1931–2023)

Roland Cantzler (4 April 1931 – 24 September 2023) was a German jurist and politician, representative of the Christian Social Union of Bavaria. He was a member of the German Bundestag.

== Life and career ==
After leaving school and having successfully passed the Abitur examination, Cantzler studied law, economics, and tax law. He then worked as a public prosecutor in Weiden in der Oberpfalz, Ansbach and Nuremberg, and was a judge from 1961 to 1970 at the Nuremberg Social Security Court, before becoming President of the Bayreuth Social Security Court in 1978. He was President of the Nuremberg Social Security Court from 1994 to 1996. In addition, he was Deputy Head of the Nuremberg Pensions Authority.

Cantzler joined the CSU, becoming involved with their youth wing, the Young Union (JU), and was Regional Deputy Chair of the JU for Nuremberg. He was also Deputy Chair of the Nuremberg CSU party.

Cantzler was a city councilor in Nuremberg from 1972 to 1996. He entered the Bundestag on 7 June 1972, when he succeeded Karl Theodor Freiherr von und zu Guttenberg, remaining only until the end of the 1972 parliamentary term. He was elected to fill this role due to his position on the CSU's regional list for Bavaria.

Roland Cantzler died on 24 September 2023, at the age of 92.

== See also ==
- List of Bavarian Christian Social Union politicians
