= Bruno Brandes =

German politician (1910–1985)

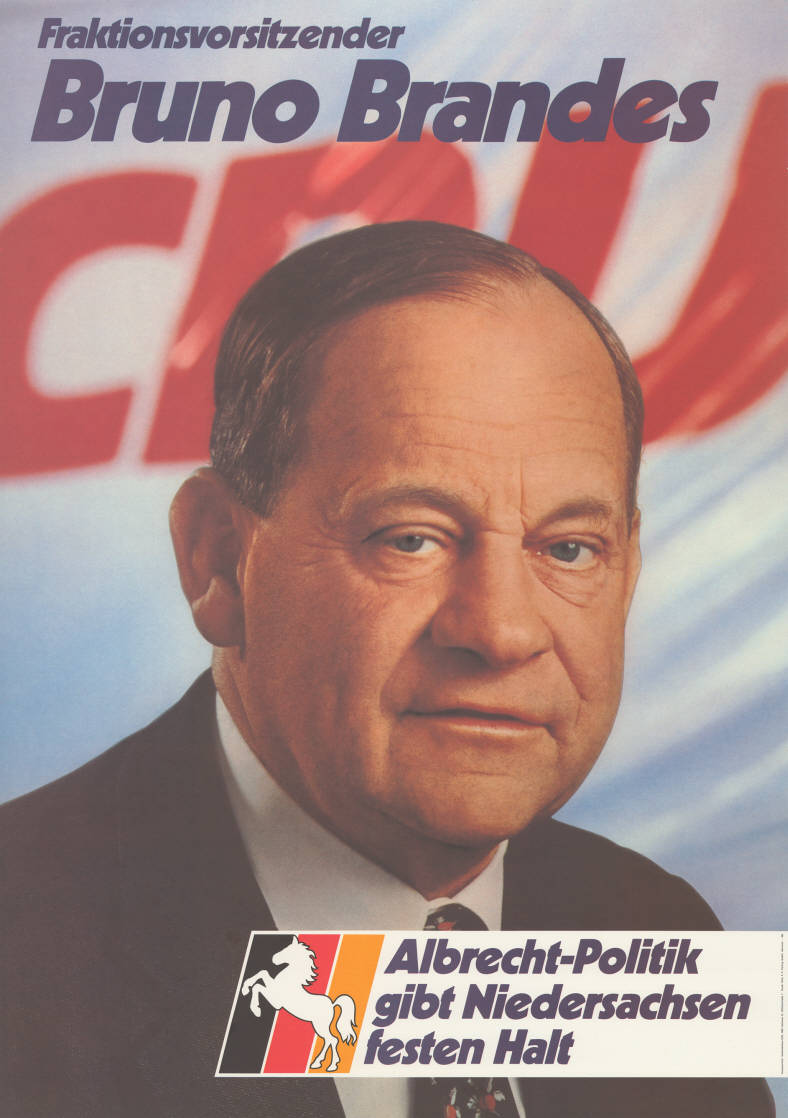
- Bruno Brandes' candidate poster for the state election in Lower Saxony 1982

Member of the Bundestag
- In office 20 October 1969 – 29 October 1969

Personal details
- Born: 27 March 1910 Groß Ilsede
- Died: 21 June 1985 (aged 75) Bischofsgrün, Bavaria, Germany
- Party: CDU
- Relatives: Ina Brandes (granddaughter)

Bruno Brandes (27 March 1910 – 21 June 1985) was a German politician of the Christian Democratic Union (CDU) and former member of the German Bundestag.

== Life ==
Brandes had been mayor and council member of the town of Holzminden and member of the district council of the district of Holzminden since 1956. He was a member of the Lower Saxony state parliament from 1963 until his death. There he was chairman of the CDU parliamentary group from 1965 to 1970 and from 1976 to 1982. From 1973 to 1978, he was chairman of the Legal and Constitutional Committee, and from 1982 to 198,5 he served as President of the State Parliament and from 1981 to 1985 also as District Administrator of the Holzminden District.

He was elected to the German Bundestag in the 1969 federal elections, but resigned his seat on 29 October 1969 to remain in Lower Saxony's state politics.

== Literature ==
Herbst, Ludolf; Jahn, Bruno (2002). Vierhaus, Rudolf (ed.). Biographisches Handbuch der Mitglieder des Deutschen Bundestages. 1949–2002 [Biographical Handbook of the Members of the German Bundestag. 1949–2002] (in German). München: De Gruyter – De Gruyter Saur. p. 1715. ISBN 978-3-11-184511-1.
