= Karl Theodor Freiherr von und zu Guttenberg =

German politician (1921-1972)

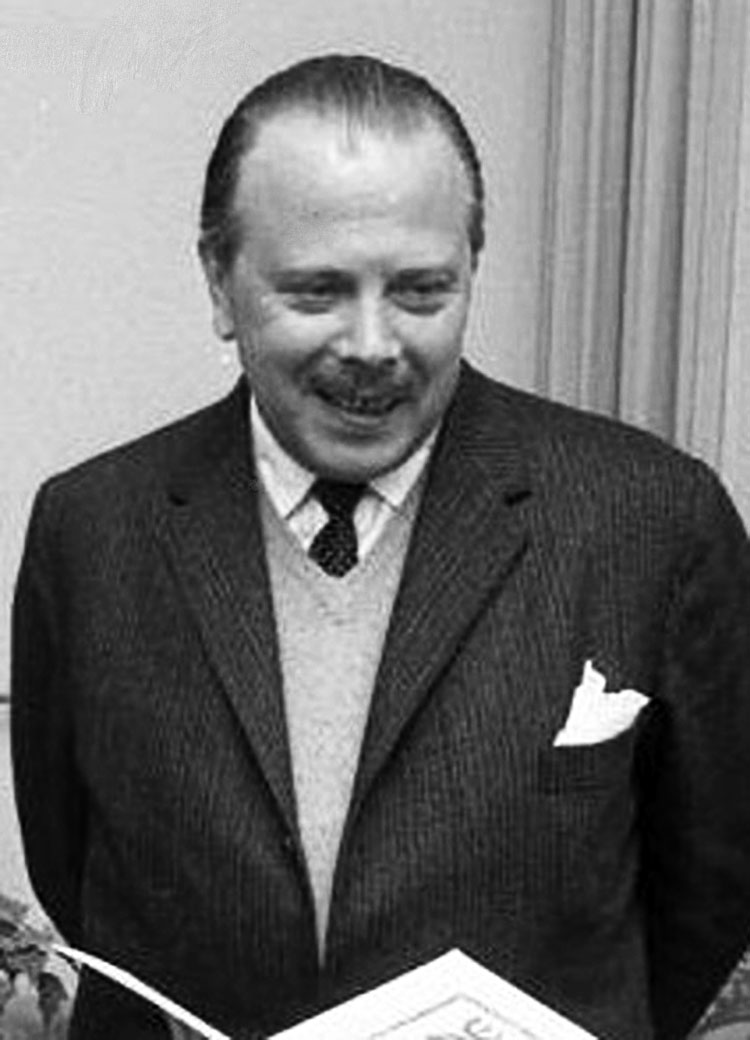
- Guttenberg in 1967

Member of the Bundestag; from Bavaria
- In office 15 October 1957 – 6 June 1972
- Preceded by: Michael Horlacher
- Succeeded by: Roland Cantzler
- Constituency: Forchheim (1957–1965); Kulmbach (1965–1969); State list (1969–1972)

Personal details
- Born: Karl Theodor Maria Georg Achaz Eberhardt Josef Freiherr von und zu Guttenberg; 23 May 1921 Weisendorf, Germany
- Died: 4 October 1972 (aged 51) Stadtsteinach, West Germany
- Party: Christian Social Union
- Children: 4, including Enoch
- Relatives: Guttenberg family Arenberg family (by marriage)
- Education: Stella Matutina

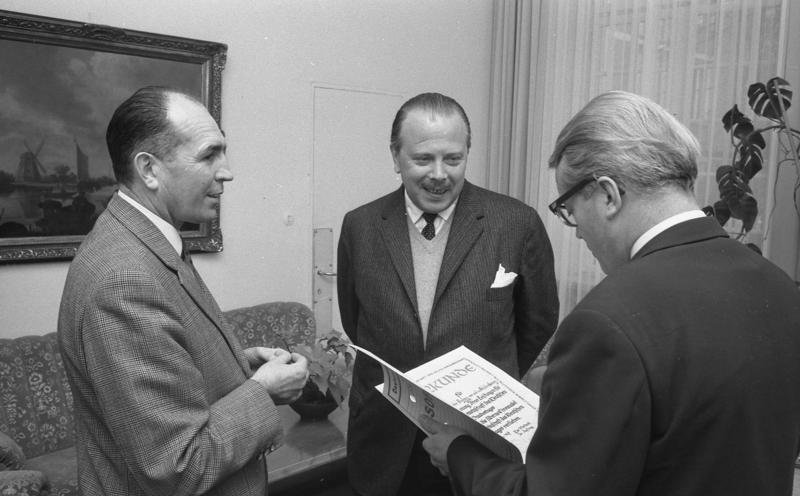
Karl Theodor Freiherr von und zu Guttenberg (center), December 1967

Karl Theodor Maria Georg Achaz Eberhardt Josef Freiherr von und zu Guttenberg (23 May 1921 – 4 October 1972) was a German politician of the Christian Social Union of Bavaria (CSU). He was parliamentary secretary of state in the Chancellor's Office in the government of Kurt Georg Kiesinger from 1967 until 1969, as well as the foreign policy spokesman of the CDU/CSU group in the Bundestag. Guttenberg was perceived as a conservative anti-communist as well as a proponent of European integration. His work was mostly within the field of foreign policy.

Guttenberg served as an officer during World War II, but was punished for anti-Nazi statements and became, through his uncle Karl Ludwig Freiherr von und zu Guttenberg, a member of the anti-Nazi resistance in the German army. While his uncle was imprisoned after the 20 July plot and executed shortly before the war's end, Karl Theodor zu Guttenberg was taken prisoner of war by the British, and soon after started to work for British propaganda, including the Soldatensender Calais.

Guttenberg owned large estates in Franconia, several hotels as well as the winery Weingut Reichsrat von Buhl in the Palatinate. Himself a member of the House of Guttenberg, he married Rosa Sophie Prinzessin von Arenberg, of the House of Arenberg, in 1943. Their son Enoch zu Guttenberg became a conductor as well as inherited Weingut Reichsrat von Buhl. His grandson is the politician and former federal government minister Karl-Theodor zu Guttenberg.

He became a member of the CSU in 1946, and was a member of the Bundestag from 1957 to 1972, where he represented Kulmbach. In the Bundestag, he was a noted public speaker and was for several years the foreign policy spokesman of the CDU/CSU group. Guttenberg was a fierce critic of the Ostpolitik of Willy Brandt. After Brandt's government had recognized the existence of "a second German state" (the German Democratic Republic), he called it a "dark hour". While most of the CDU/CSU group abstained during the vote on the Basic Treaty, 1972, Guttenberg voted against. In a speech, he stated: "The "GDR" must be revealed to the world for what it is: Not a state, but a caricature of a state".

A Roman Catholic, Guttenberg became a Knight of the Order of the Holy Sepulchre in 1957. He received the Grand Cross of the Order of Merit of the Federal Republic of Germany in 1972.

== Death ==
He died of amyotrophic lateral sclerosis in 1972, aged 51.

== Publications ==
- Gemeinsame Außenpolitik? Eine Antwort auf Herbert Wehner, Bonn 1960
- Wenn der Westen will. Plädoyer für eine mutige Politik, Stuttgart 1964
- Deutschland in der atlantischen Partnerschaft, Düsseldorf 1965
- Wege zur Wiedervereinigung. Brauchen wir eine neue Deutschlandpolitik?, Hamburg 1965
- Die Zukunft Europas. Wirtschaftliche, politische und weltanschauliche Aspekte, Düsseldorf 1970
- Im Interesse der Freiheit, Stuttgart 1970
- Fußnoten, Stuttgart 1971
- Die neue Ostpolitik. Wege und Irrwege, Osnabrück 1972
