= Fritz-Rudolf Schultz =

German politician (1917–2002)

- Born: 19 February 1917; Munich, German Empire
- Died: 2 March 2002 (aged 85); Gau-Bischofsheim, Germany
- Occupation: Politician
- Awards: Knight's Cross of the Iron Cross with Oak Leaves; Great Cross of Merit

Fritz-Rudolf Schultz (19 February 1917 – 2 March 2002) was a German politician and member of the FDP. During World War II, Schultz served in the Wehrmacht as an officer and regimental commander. He was awarded the Knight's Cross of the Iron Cross with Oak Leaves.

After the war Schultz initially worked on his parents vineyard in Gau-Bischofsheim. He became a member of the German Bundestag and was elected Ombudsman for the Military (Wehrbeauftragter) on 11 March 1970. He held this office until 19 March 1975.

== Awards ==
- Iron Cross (1939) 2nd Class (29 September 1939) & 1st Class (1 September 1940)
- German Cross in Gold on 26 December 1943 as Hauptmann in the I./Panzer-Regiment 35
- Knight's Cross of the Iron Cross with Oak Leaves
  - Knight's Cross on 21 April 1944 as Hauptmann of the Reserve and commander of the I./Panzer-Regiment 35
  - Oak Leaves on 28 October 1944 as Major and leader of Panzer-Regiment 35
