= Hermann Otto Solms =

German politician (born 1940)

Hermann Otto Solms MdB
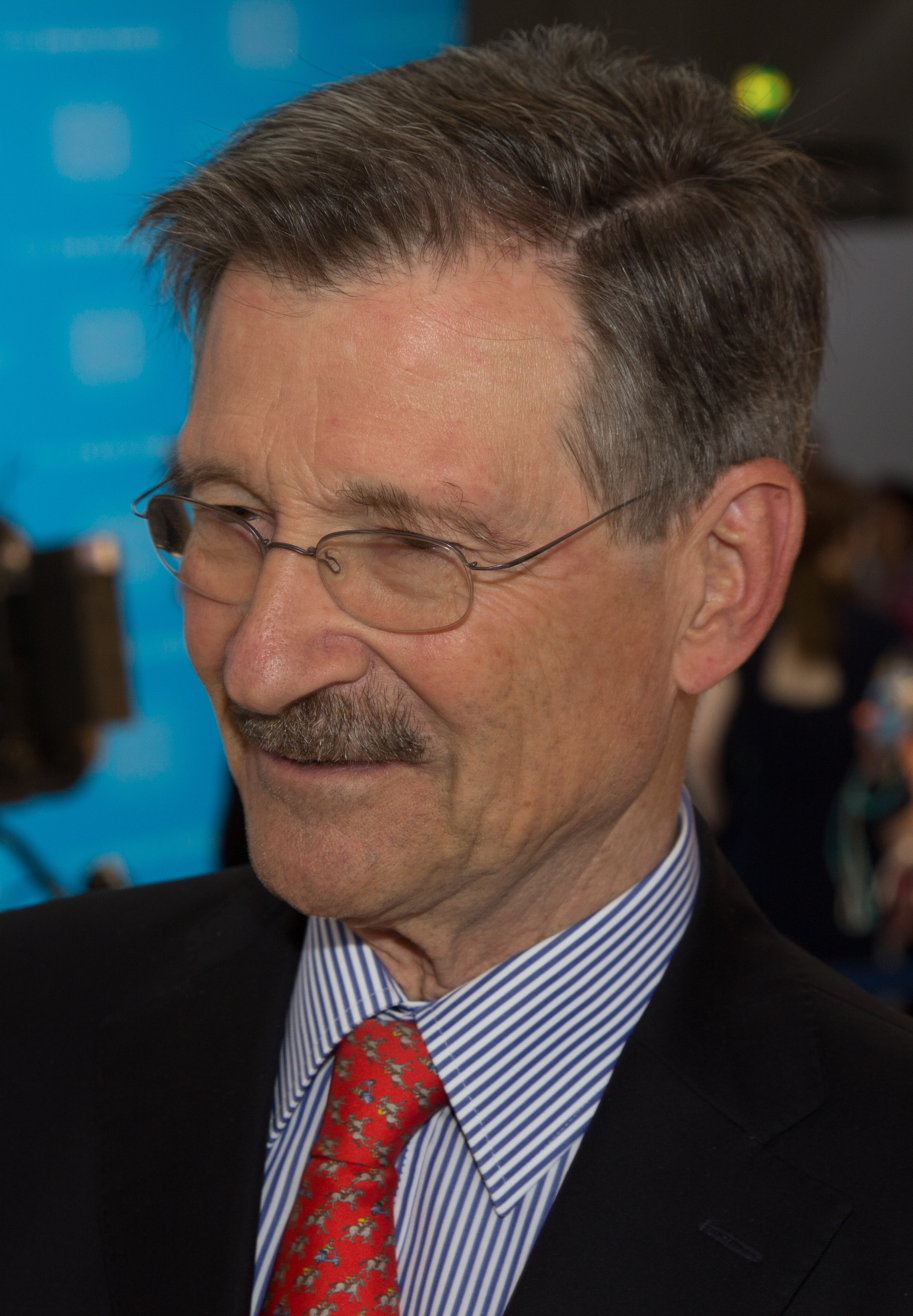
- Solms in 2018

Vice President of the Bundestag (on proposal of the FDP-group)
- In office 26 October 1998 – 22 October 2013
- Preceded by: Burkhard Hirsch
- Succeeded by: Wolfgang Kubicki (2017)

Leader of the Free Democratic Party in the Bundestag
- In office 15 January 1991 – 26 October 1998
- Preceded by: Wolfgang Mischnick
- Succeeded by: Wolfgang Gerhardt

Member of the Bundestag for Hesse
- In office 24 October 2017 – 26 October 2021
- Constituency: Free Democratic Party List
- In office 4 November 1980 – 22 October 2013
- Constituency: Free Democratic Party List

Personal details
- Born: 24 November 1940 (age 85) Lich, German Reich
- Party: Free Democratic Party
- Spouse: Christiane Meyer zu Eissen
- Children: 3
- Education: University of Frankfurt; University of Giessen; Kansas State University, Manhattan
- Website: Official website

Hermann Otto Solms (born Hermann Otto Prince zu Solms-Hohensolms-Lich; 24 November 1940) is a German politician of the Free Democratic Party (FDP).

Between 1980 and 2013, he was a member of the Bundestag, from 1991 to 1998 as Chairman of the FDP parliamentary party and from 1998 to 2013 as Vice President of the Bundestag. After a four year absence, he was re-elected to the Bundestag in 2017 before retiring in 2021.

== Early life ==
Solms was born posthumously, the third son and fifth child of Hermann Otto Hereditary Prince zu Solms-Hohensolms-Lich (1902–1940). His father was the heir to the fortune and legacy of the Princes zu Solms-Hohensolms-Lich, a noble family known in Germany since 1129, whose Imperial county was made a principality of the Holy Roman Empire in 1792, but mediatized under the sovereignty of the Grand Duchy of Hesse in 1806. Hermann Otto's father died while serving as a lieutenant in the Luftwaffe at Neuruppin on 3 July 1940. His mother, née Baroness Gertrude von Werthern-Beichlingen (1913–1987), was remarried in 1950 to Hans Joachim Sell of Neustettin.

After completing his secondary education (Abitur) in 1960, Solms carried out his obligatory military service and then completed a commercial apprenticeship in 1964. He studied Economics in Frankfurt am Main and Giessen, Germany and Kansas, USA, finishing in 1969 with an economics degree and in 1975 with a doctoral degree in agriculture (Dr. agr.).

In 1970 he began working as a researcher at the Institute for Environmental Management Studies at University of Giessen and in 1973 he became the personal advisor of Bundestag vice president Liselotte Funcke. Since 1976 he has been an independent consultant.

== Political career ==
Since 1971, Solms has been a member of the FDP, holding the post of Treasury Secretary from 1987 to 1999. After the death of his successor, Günter Rexrodt, Solms was again appointed Secretary of the Treasury in the middle of 2004, confirmed on 5 May 2005 in Cologne by a majority of 90.6%.

=== Member of Parliament, 1980–2013 ===
Solms was a member of the Bundestag (MdB) between 1980 and 2013, serving as Deputy Chairman from 1985 to 1991, and as Chairman of the FDP Bundestag parliamentary group from 15 January 1991 to 26 October 1998.

Following the 1998 elections Solms was selected to serve as Vice President of the Bundestag, under the leadership of President Wolfgang Thierse. In his capacity as vice president, he was also a member of the parliament's Council of Elders, which – among other duties – determines daily legislative agenda items and assigns committee chairpersons based on party representation. He was selected for this office again in 2002, 2005 and 2009.

In the negotiations to form a coalition government with the Christian Democrats – both the Christian Democratic Union (CDU) and the Christian Social Union in Bavaria (CSU) – following the 2009 federal elections, Solms led the FDP delegation in the working group on taxes, national budget, and financial policy; his counterpart from the CDU was Thomas de Maizière. He did not run for a parliamentary seat in the 2013 elections after having failed to be selected for the first position on the Hesse FDP state list in December 2012. His term as Member of Bundestag expired on 22 September 2013.

=== Member of Parliament, 2017–2021 ===
In the 2017 federal elections, Solms was again elected to the Bundestag. At the age of 76 years, he opened the parliament's first session. In the (unsuccessful) negotiations to form a coalition government with the CDU/CSU and the Green Party following the elections, he was part of the FDP delegation. Since 2018, he has been serving as deputy chairman of the Berlin-Taipei Parliamentary Circle of Friends.

In late 2019, Solms announced that he would not stand in the 2021 federal elections but instead resign from active politics at the end of the parliamentary term.

== Other activities ==
=== Corporate boards ===
- Deutsche Vermögensberatung (DVAG), Member of the Advisory Board
- Piper Deutschland AG, Member of the Supervisory Board

=== Non-profit organizations ===
- Deutsche Stiftung Eigentum, Chairman of the Board of Trustees
- Friedrich Naumann Foundation, Member of the Board of Trustees
- Herbert Giersch Stiftung, Member of the Advisory Board
- Peace of Westphalia Prize, Member of the Jury
- Association of German Foundations, Member of the Parliamentary Advisory Board (2009–2013)
- German Institute for International and Security Affairs (SWP), Member of the Council (2002–2005)

== Personal life ==
From 1969 to 1971 Solms was married to Margit Mayer (born 1944), by whom he had no children. In 1989 he married Christiane Meyer zu Eisen (born 1955), with whom he had three daughters.

== Awards ==
- Taiwan: Order of Propitious Clouds with Grand Cordon (2019).
