= Burkhard Hirsch =

German politician (1930–2020)

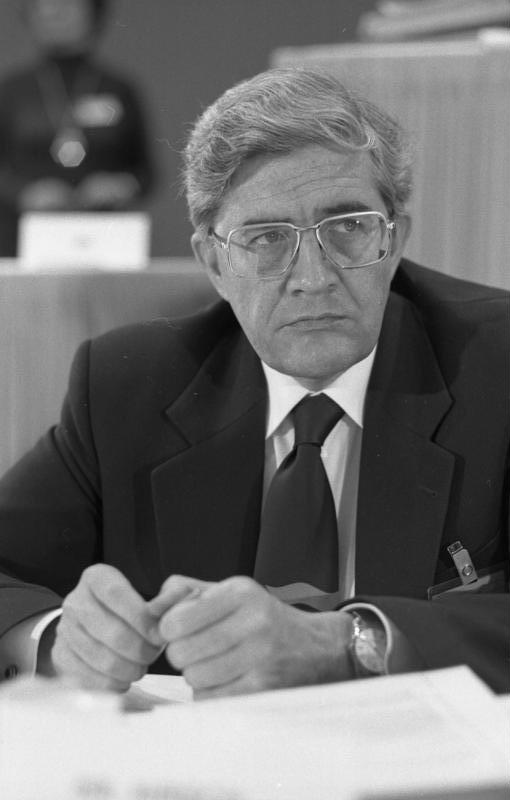

Vice President of the Bundestag (on proposal of the FDP-group)
- In office 10 November 1994 – 26 October 1998
- Preceded by: Dieter-Julius Cronenberg
- Succeeded by: Hermann Otto Solms

Member of the Bundestag
- In office 1980–1998

Minister of the Interior of North Rhine-Westphalia
- In office 28 May 1975 – 4 June 1980
- Preceded by: Willi Weyer
- Succeeded by: Herbert Schnoor

Member of the German Bundestag
- In office 1972 – 28 May 1975

Personal details
- Born: 29 May 1930 Magdeburg, Germany
- Died: 11 March 2020 (aged 89) Düsseldorf, Germany
- Party: Free Democratic Party
- Education: University of Marburg
- Profession: Lawyer

Burkhard Hirsch (29 May 1930 – 11 March 2020) was a German politician and civil liberties advocate. A member of the Free Democratic Party (FDP), Hirsch spent 21 years in the Bundestag (1972–1975, 1980–1998). He also served five years as Minister of the Interior of North Rhine-Westphalia (1975–1980).

== Early life and career ==
Born in Magdeburg, then part of the Prussian Province of Saxony, Hirsch earned his Abitur in Halle. He studied law and political sciences (Rechts- und Staatswissenschaften) at the University of Marburg. He completed his first and second Staatsexamen in 1954 and 1959, respectively, and earned his Doctor of Laws in 1961 with a doctoral thesis Der Begriff des Bundesstaates in der deutschen Staatsrechtslehre. He worked as a lawyer at the Amts- und Landgericht Düsseldorf from 1964. He was a member of the Wirtschaftsvereinigung Eisen- und Stahlindustrie from 1960 to 1967.

== Political career ==
Hirsch joined the FDP in 1949 and was a member of their youth organisation Jungdemokraten until 1964. He served on the city council of Düsseldorf from 1964 to 1972 and was president of the regional party from 1971 to 1977. He served on the party's board in North Rhine-Westphalia from 1971 to 2005, and then became its honorary chairman. He first attained a seat in the Bundestag in the 1972 federal election. From 1973 to 2005, he was on the FDP's national board and then became an honorary member. Hirsch left the Bundestag in 1975 to become Minister of the Interior of North Rhine-Westphalia, serving as vice minister-president from 1979. He returned to the Bundestag in 1980. From 1994 to 1998, he was a vice president of the Bundestag.

Hirsch gained a reputation as one of the most vocal advocates for civil liberties in Germany, which earned him the Arnold-Freymuth-Preis in 1998 and the Fritz Bauer Prize in 2006. Hirsch was also awarded an honorary doctorate by the Goethe University Frankfurt in 2006, and was praised in a speech by Peter-Alexis Albrecht as "a nonpartisan, relentless, and aggressive advocate of the rigorous rule of law".

== Later life and death ==
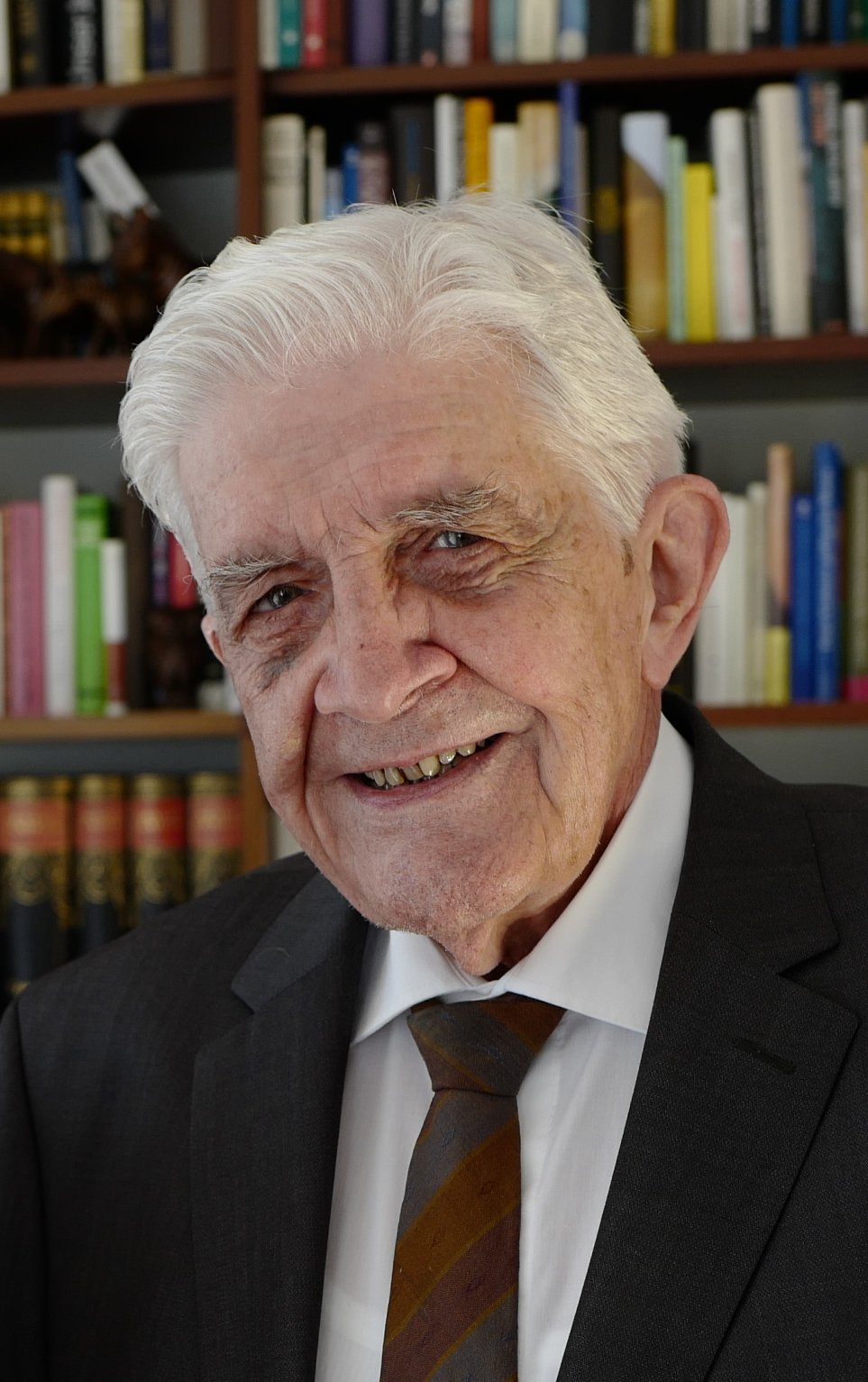
Hirsch in 2017

Hirsch was president of the council of the Hochschule Düsseldorf from 2008 to 2015, with a short interruption. For his influential work for the academy, he was the first to be awarded an honorary citizenship, in May 2016. He died on 11 March 2020. The Hochschule wrote in an obituary:

Er war gleichsam ein Brückenbauer zwischen den Menschen und Nationen – in der logischen Argumentation sachlich und konstruktiv; in seinem Handeln und Wirken stets menschlich zugewandt und wohlwollend.
(He was, as it were, a bridge-builder between people and nations – practical and constructive in his logical argumentation and always humane and benevolent in his actions and influence.)

== Awards ==
- 2016: Honorary citizen (Ehrenbürger of the Hochschule Düsseldorf)
- 2006: Honorary doctorate of the Goethe University Frankfurt
- 2006: Fritz Bauer Prize of the Humanistische Union
- 1998: Arnold-Freymuth-Preis
- 1998: Josef-Neuberger-Medaille
- 1976: Theodor-Heuss-Preis of the Theodor-Heuss-Stiftung
