= Commentary on Edward Snowden's disclosure =

Reactions to global surveillance disclosures

Commentary on Edward Snowden's disclosure is part of the reactions to global surveillance disclosures made by Edward Snowden.

== Executive branch ==
On June 8, 2013, Director of National Intelligence (DNI) James R. Clapper denounced as "reckless" the disclosures of "intelligence community measures used to keep Americans safe." He condemned the leaks as having done "huge, grave damage" to the U.S. intelligence capabilities.

Later that month, U.S. President Barack Obama was dismissive of Snowden, saying, "I'm not going to be scrambling jets to get a 29-year-old hacker." In early August, Obama said that Snowden was no patriot and that Americans would have been better off if they had remained unaware of the NSA surveillance activities that Snowden revealed. Obama also said that he had "called for a thorough review of our surveillance operations before Mr. Snowden made these leaks.... My preference, and I think the American people's preference, would have been for a lawful, orderly examination of these laws; a thoughtful fact-based debate that would then lead us to a better place."

On August 4, Chairman of the Joint Chiefs of Staff Martin Dempsey said on the weekly ABC interview show This Week that Snowden "has caused us some considerable damage to our intelligence architecture. Our adversaries are changing the way that they communicate."

In September, DNI Clapper acknowledged that Snowden may have done a public service and started a needed debate about the balance between privacy and security. "As loath as I am to give any credit for what's happened here, which was egregious, I think it's clear that some of the conversations that this has generated, some of the debate, actually probably needed to happen," he said. "It's unfortunate they didn't happen some time ago, but if there's a good side to this, that's it."

On January 29, 2014, DNI Clapper gave public testimony to a session of the Senate Intelligence Committee. He asked that "Snowden and his accomplices" return the purloined NSA documents. When Clapper was asked whether the word "accomplices" referred to journalists, Clapper's spokesperson Shawn Turner responded, "Director Clapper was referring to anyone who is assisting Edward Snowden to further threaten our national security through the unauthorized disclosure of stolen documents related to lawful foreign intelligence collection programs."

=== Former executive branch officials ===
In late June 2013, Former US President Jimmy Carter said: "He's obviously violated the laws of America, for which he's responsible, but I think the invasion of human rights and American privacy has gone too far ... I think that the secrecy that has been surrounding this invasion of privacy has been excessive, so I think that the bringing of it to the public notice has probably been, in the long term, beneficial."

Earlier that month, former Vice President Dick Cheney suggested that Snowden might be a spy working for the Chinese government.

Some former U.S. intelligence officials speculated that Chinese or Russian intelligence agents might have gleaned additional classified material from Snowden, a view shared by some former Russian agents. Snowden, however, told journalist Glenn Greenwald in July, "I never gave any information to either government, and they never took anything from my laptops."

Stewart Baker, a former NSA general counsel in the early 1990s, said at a July 18, 2013 hearing, "I am afraid that hyped and distorted press reports orchestrated by Edward Snowden and his allies may cause us – or other nations – to construct new restraints on our intelligence gathering, restraints that will leave us vulnerable to another security disaster."

Former CIA and NSA chief General Michael Hayden in late June 2013 welcomed the public debate about the balance between privacy and security that the leaks had provoked: "I am convinced the more the American people know exactly what it is we are doing in this balance between privacy and security, the more they know the more comfortable they will feel." In September 2013, Hayden stressed the indisputable legality of "what the NSA is doing" and called Snowden a "troubled young man", albeit "morally arrogant to a tremendous degree"; he also said about his prospects in Russia: "I suspect he will end up like most of the rest of the defectors who went to the old Soviet Union: Isolated, bored, lonely, depressed -- and most of them ended up alcoholics."

Speaking at the University of Connecticut on April 23, 2014, former U.S. Secretary of State Hillary Clinton insinuated that she found Snowden's motives suspicious. "When he emerged and when he absconded with all that material, I was puzzled because we have all these protections for whistle-blowers. If he were concerned and wanted to be part of the American debate, he could have been," she said. "But it struck me as—I just have to be honest with you—as sort of odd that he would flee to China, because Hong Kong is controlled by China, and that he would then go to Russia—two countries with which we have very difficult cyberrelationships, to put it mildly." Clinton added, "I think turning over a lot of that material—intentionally or unintentionally—drained, gave all kinds of information, not only to big countries, but to networks and terrorist groups and the like. So I have a hard time thinking that somebody who is a champion of privacy and liberty has taken refuge in Russia, under Putin's authority."

== Congress ==
Reactions to Snowden's disclosures among members of Congress initially were largely negative. Speaker of the House John Boehner and senators Dianne Feinstein and Bill Nelson called Snowden a traitor, and several senators and representatives joined them in calling for Snowden's arrest and prosecution.

Representative Thomas Massie was one of few members of Congress to question the constitutional validity of the government surveillance programs and suggest that Snowden should be granted immunity from prosecution. Senator Rand Paul offered tentative support for Snowden, saying they were reserving judgment on Snowden until more information about the surveillance programs and about Snowden's motives were known. Senator Paul said, "I do think when history looks at this, they are going to contrast the behavior of James Clapper, our National Intelligence Director, with Edward Snowden. Mr. Clapper lied in Congress in defiance of the law, in the name of security. Mr. Snowden told the truth in the name of privacy." Paul later called Snowden a "civil disobedient", like Martin Luther King Jr., but who faced life imprisonment. Representative John Lewis made comparisons between Snowden and Gandhi, saying the leaker was appealing to a "higher law".

Senator Bill Nelson, "What Edward Snowden did amounts to an act of treason." Similar comments have also been made by Rep. Peter T. King, Rep. John Boehner, and Sen. Dianne Feinstein.

On July 25, the US Senate Committee on Appropriations unanimously adopted an amendment by Senator Lindsey Graham to the "Fiscal Year 2014 Department of State, Foreign Operations, and Related Programs Appropriations Bill" that would seek sanctions against any country that offers asylum to Snowden.

In response to the information release by Snowden, Rep. Justin Amash (R-Mich.) and Rep. John Conyers (D-Mich.) proposed an amendment to the National Defense Authorization Act to curtail the NSA gathering and storage of the personal records, but the House rejected it by a narrow margin of 205–217. Amash subsequently told Fox News that Snowden was "a whistle-blower. He told us what we need to know."

On the Sunday ABC interview show This Week, Rep. Dutch Ruppersberger, D-Maryland, of the United States House Select Committee on Intelligence was asked by Raddatz, "Are efforts being thwarted in trying to get information for members of Congress?" He replied,

...[S]ince this incident occurred with Snowden, we've had three different hearings for members of our Democratic Caucus, and the Republican Caucus, where General Alexander has come with his deputy, Chris Inglis, to ask any questions that people have as it relates to this information. And we will continue to do that because what we're trying to do now is to get the American public to know more about what's going on....But we can do better. I have to educate my caucus more, the Democratic Caucus. And we're trying to declassify as much as we can.

U.S. Senator John McCain (R-AZ) said on the August 11 edition of Fox News Sunday that Snowden had become a hero to young Americans, as he reminded them of the Jason Bourne character. McCain attributed it to generation change and a lack of confidence in the federal government. "Right now there's kind of a generational change," he said. "Young Americans do not trust this government."

Gordon Humphrey, the conservative Republican senator for New Hampshire from 1979 to 1991, expressed support for Snowden. Glenn Greenwald revealed that Humphrey, a former member of the Senate Foreign Relations Committee, had been in contact with Snowden via email. Humphrey told Snowden, "Provided you have not leaked information that would put in harms way any intelligence agent, I believe you have done the right thing in exposing what I regard as massive violation of the United States Constitution." Humphrey cited Snowden as a "courageous whistle-blower".

Tom McClintock (R-Calif) came out in favor of amnesty for Snowden, saying

I think it would be best if the American government granted him amnesty to get him back to America where he can answer questions without the threat of prosecution... We have some very good laws against sharing secrets and he broke those laws. On the other hand, he broke them for a very good reason because those laws were being used in direct contravention of our 4th Amendment rights as Americans.

Arizona Senator John McCain criticized politicians who voted in favor of the PATRIOT Act, but were outraged by the NSA spying on phone calls by saying, "We passed the Patriot Act. We passed specific provisions of the act that allowed for this program to take place, to be enacted in operation. Now, if members of Congress did not know what they were voting on, then I think that that's their responsibility a lot more than it is the government's."

In 2013, an IP address linked to the U.S. Senate was seen editing Snowden's Wikipedia page to refer to him as a traitor instead of a dissident. Similarly, in 2014, an IP address linked to the House of Representatives edited Navi Pillay's page to refer to Snowden as an "American traitor".

== Public ==
Glenn Greenwald, one of the journalists who received the documents, praised Snowden for having done a service by revealing the surveillance on the American public. John Cassidy of The New Yorker called Snowden "a hero" and said that "in revealing the colossal scale of the US government's eavesdropping on Americans and other people around the world, [Snowden] has performed a great public service that more than outweighs any breach of trust he may have committed." CNN columnist Douglas Rushkoff also called Snowden's leak an act of heroism. Amy Davidson, writing in The New Yorker, was thankful for the "overdue" conversation on privacy and the limits of domestic surveillance.

American political commentators and public figures such as Noam Chomsky, Chris Hedges, Michael Moore, Cornel West, Glenn Beck, Matt Drudge, Alex Jones, Andrew Napolitano, Oliver Stone, Michael Savage, and Stephen Walt praised Snowden for exposing secret government surveillance.

Other commentators were more critical of Snowden's methods and motivations. Jeffrey Toobin, for example, denounced Snowden as "a grandiose narcissist who deserves to be in prison". Writing in The New Yorker, Toobin argued that the programs exposed were not illegal, therefore Snowden was not a whistleblower. Further, Toobin questioned "whether the government can function when all of its employees (and contractors) can take it upon themselves to sabotage the programs they don't like".

The editors of Bloomberg News argued that, while the government ought to prosecute Snowden, the media's focus on Snowden took attention away from issues of U.S. government surveillance, the interpretations of the Patriot Act, and the Foreign Intelligence Surveillance Act (FISA) court actions, all of which are "what really matters in all this." Greenwald accused the media in the U.S. of focusing on Edward Snowden instead of on wrongdoing by Director of National Intelligence James R. Clapper and other U.S. officials. In an op-ed, author Alex Berenson argued that the federal government should have flown a representative to Hong Kong to ask Snowden to give testimony in front of the U.S. Congress and offer him a fair criminal trial, with a view to preventing further unintended disclosures of classified information to other countries.

Cybersecurity scholar Peter Singer divided the material disclosed by Snowden into three categories: "smart, useful espionage against enemies of the United States; legally questionable activities that involved US citizens through backdoors and fudging of policy/law; un-strategic (stupid) actions targeting American allies that has had huge blowback on US standing and US business." It was postulated that these were differing ways people viewed Snowden, which could explain why he was so polarizing. Singer also spoke of a "double legacy" from the NSA revelations released by Snowden: "One, it's hollowed out the American ability to operate effectively in ensuring the future of the internet itself, in the way we would hope it would be. That has huge long-term consequences. And the second is, it's been and will be a hammer-blow to American technology companies. The cloud computing industry, for example, had a recent estimate that they'll lose $36 billion worth of business because of this."

=== Public opinion polls ===
Surveys conducted by news outlets and professional polling organizations found that American public opinion was divided on Snowden's disclosures, and that those polled in Canada and Europe were more supportive of Snowden than respondents in the U.S.

==== United States ====
===== 2013 =====
- June 10–11, 2013: Gallup poll showed 44 percent of Americans thought it was right for Snowden to share the information with the press while 42 percent thought it was wrong.
- June 12–16: USA Today/Pew Research poll found that 49 percent thought the release of information served the public interest while 44 percent thought it harmed it. The same poll found that 54 percent felt a criminal case should be brought against Snowden, and 38 percent disagreed.
- June 12–16: The Washington Post-ABC News poll cited 43 percent of respondents saying Snowden ought to be charged with a crime, while 48 percent said he ought not.
- June 17–18: Rasmussen Reports asked Americans to describe Snowden in a single word. Twelve percent said he was a hero, 21 percent called him a traitor, 34 percent said he fell somewhere in between, and 29 percent said it was too early to tell.
- June 15–July 1: The Economist/YouGov poll tracked public opinion over three consecutive weekends, comparing results from June 15–17, June 22–24 and June 29–July 1. Asked their view of Snowden, respondents indicating "favorable" rose from 40 percent to 42 percent then down to 36 percent. "Unfavorable" grew steadily from 39 percent to 41 percent to 43 percent. Those supporting his prosecution increased from 27 percent to 34 percent and held there; those opposed steadily declined from 32 percent to 31 percent to 25 percent.
- July 1–2: The Huffington Post/YouGov poll found that 38 percent of Americans thought Snowden did the wrong thing, 33 percent said he did the right thing, and 29 percent were unsure.
- July 17–21: NBC News/The Wall Street Journal Survey found that 11 percent of Americans viewed Snowden positively while 34 percent had a negative view.
- June 28–July 8: Quinnipiac University Polling Institute survey found that 55 percent of Americans regarded Snowden as a whistleblower while 34 percent saw him as a traitor. When Quinnipiac repeated the poll from July 28–31, the results were unchanged.
- July 28–29: Among likely U.S. voters surveyed by Rasmussen Reports, 32 percent considered Snowden a traitor who endangered lives and national security, whereas 11 percent called him a hero.
- November 14–17: The Washington Post-ABC News poll found a significant shift in opinion as to whether or not Snowden ought to be charged with a crime. In contrast to the same organizations' June poll, November's results showed 52 percent favoring his prosecution (up from 43 percent) and 38 percent opposed (down from 48 percent). Similarly, when asked whether, irrespective of his being charged with a crime, Snowden was right or wrong to disclose the NSA intelligence-gathering efforts, 37 percent said he was right and 55 percent said he was wrong. All told, nearly two to one (60 percent versus 32 percent) thought Snowden's disclosures had harmed U.S. national security.

===== 2014 =====
- January 15–19: USA Today/Pew Research poll reported little change from the previous June on the question of the government pursuing a criminal case against Snowden, with 56 percent in favor and 32 percent opposed. The poll found that people younger than 30 offered the least support for prosecution, being evenly divided at 42 percent in favor and 42 percent opposed. Over all age groups, opinion was also nearly equally divided as to whether or not Snowden's disclosures had served the public interest: 45 percent said yes, while 43 percent said Snowden harmed the public interest.
- January 18–20: The Economist/YouGov poll likewise found Americans evenly split, with 43 percent viewing Snowden favorably and 41 percent unfavorably; 46 percent approving his leaks and 43 percent disapproving; 28 percent supporting his prosecution and 29 percent opposed.
- January 22: CBS News poll revealed a larger split (almost 3:1) as to whether or not Snowden ought to stand trial for his actions, with 61 percent in favor and 23 percent saying he should be granted amnesty. CBS News also differed from Pew Research on the issue of whether or not Snowden's disclosures had been good for the country, with 40 percent saying yes and 46 percent saying it had been bad. When asked to come up with a word that best describes Snowden, nearly a quarter of respondents volunteered either "traitor" or a similar word questioning his loyalty to his country, while 8 percent said he is "brave" or "courageous" or "a hero." Just 2 percent volunteered that he is a "patriot" or "patriotic," and another 2 percent said "terrorist."
- January 22–25: NBC News/The Wall Street Journal Survey found continued low public approval for Snowden, with 23 percent supporting what he did, 37 percent opposing it, and 39 percent expressing no opinion.
- March 26–28: The Huffington Post/YouGov poll found that 31 percent thought Snowden was right to leak top-secret information about government surveillance programs to the media, while 33 percent believed he was wrong; 45 percent favored his prosecution, with 34 percent opposed; and 35 percent would support a presidential pardon, with 43 percent opposed.
- May 20: NBC News asked viewers to weigh in via Twitter on whether they thought Snowden was a "patriot" or "traitor." Prior to airing its Snowden interview, viewers were closely split on the matter; after the program aired, 60 percent said they considered him a patriot.
- May 29: A YouGov survey found that 55 percent of Americans thought Snowden was right to leak details of the PRISM program. Twenty percent of Americans aged 16–34 thought Snowden's actions were wrong, while 41 percent of those 55 and over held this view.
- June 1: An NBC News poll of registered voters found that 34 percent opposed Snowden's leaks, 24 percent backed him and another 40 percent had no opinion. Among those who closely followed the story, 49 percent opposed his actions and 33 percent supported them. "These overall numbers," said NBC News, "are essentially unchanged from a January 2014 NBC News/Wall Street Journal [poll], when 23 percent of registered voters said they supported Snowden's actions, versus 38 percent who opposed them."
- July 2: A poll conducted by cloud storage service Tresorit, showed that 55% of all Americans supported Edward Snowden's disclosures, whereas only 29% were against them.
- July 14: Pew Research Center found worldwide opposition to U.S. eavesdropping and a decline in the view that the U.S. respects its people's personal freedoms, but little evidence that America's overall image had been severely damaged. While the majority of Americans and others condoned spying on suspected terrorists, they agreed it is unacceptable to spy on American citizens.

==== Canada and Europe ====
In a June 2013 Emnid survey, 50 percent of Germans polled considered Snowden a hero, and 35 percent would hide him in their homes.

In October 2013, 67 percent of Canadians polled considered Snowden a hero, as did 60 percent of UK respondents.

In an April 2014 UK YouGov poll, 46 percent of British people thought that newspapers reporting on the materials given to them by Snowden was good for society, while 22 percent thought it was bad for society and 31 percent didn't know.

== Media ==
On January 1, 2014, the editorial board of The New York Times praised Snowden as a whistleblower and wrote in favor of granting him clemency, arguing that while Snowden may have broken the law, he had "done his country a great service" by bringing the abuses of the NSA to light. "When someone reveals that government officials have routinely and deliberately broken the law," they wrote, "that person should not face life in prison at the hands of the same government." The Times cast doubt on the claim made by Snowden's critics that he had damaged national security, and concluded with a request to President Obama to discontinue the "vilification" of Snowden and to give him "an incentive to return home." The article garnered an unusual amount of blowback for an editorial, with responses from multiple media outlets. The Guardian called for a pardon in an editorial coincidentally published the same day, saying Snowden should be allowed to return home with dignity.

In a January 4, 2014 article, Peter Baker of The New York Times laid out the polarization of opinions throughout the U.S. and the impetus toward clemency gained by public reaction to Snowden's revelations. Yet despite a growing backlash against government surveillance, Baker noted, calls for leniency had made little headway in the White House, Justice Department, or national security establishment.

In September 2016, the editorial board of The Washington Post characterized the issue of whether Snowden deserved a presidential pardon as "a complicated question" to which the president's answer should be "no". The editors of the Post credited Snowden for "necessary reforms" brought about by his revelations of en masse collection of telephone data by the NSA, but stressed Snowden's separate leak of information about the agency's PRISM program and other "basically defensible" intelligence operations as reasons why he should face trial, saying that Snowden hurt his credibility as "an avatar of freedom" by accepting asylum in Russia. The editors of the Post dismissed calls from human-rights organizations for clemency because of Snowden's "noble purposes" and the policy changes resulting from the leaks, and urged the president not to pardon Snowden despite the Post itself being responsible for publishing some of the leaked material. According to The Guardian, the editorial stunned many American journalists. Glenn Greenwald, one of the journalists to whom Snowden had initially leaked the classified documents, characterized the Post editorial as "an act of journalistic treachery" and "cowardice", noting that the Post had accepted a Pulitzer Prize for publishing Snowden's leaks concerning PRISM and the other operations mentioned in its editorial.

== Non-governmental organizations ==
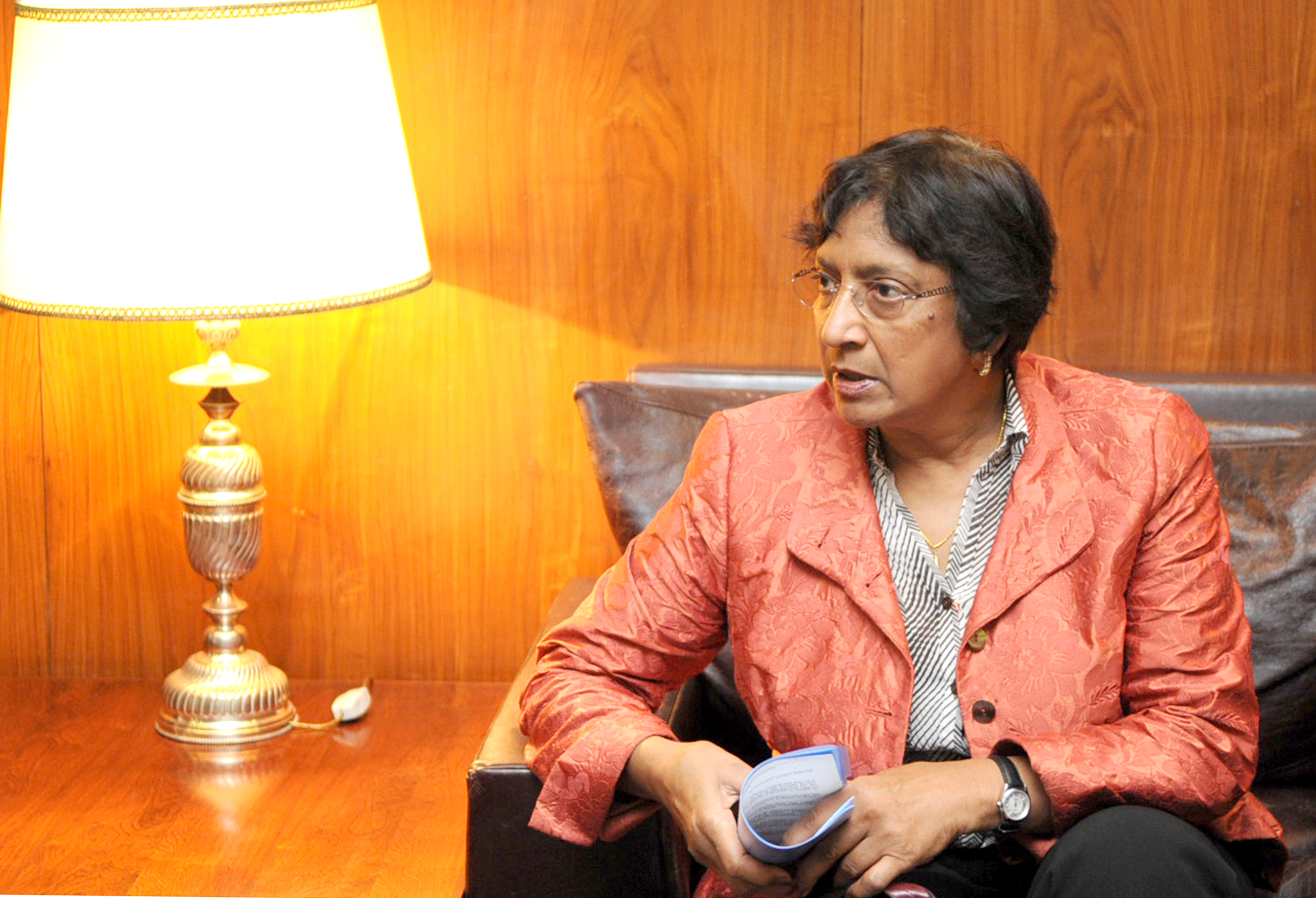
Navi Pillay, the United Nations' High Commissioner for Human Rights, said: "Without prejudging the validity of any asylum claim by Snowden, I appeal to all States to respect the internationally guaranteed right to seek asylum."

After Amnesty International met Edward Snowden in Moscow in mid July 2013, the organization said:

What he has disclosed is patently in the public interest and as a whistleblower his actions were justified. He has exposed unlawful sweeping surveillance programmes that unquestionably interfere with an individual's right to privacy. States that attempt to stop a person from revealing such unlawful behaviour are flouting international law. Freedom of expression is a fundamental right.

Widney Brown, Senior Director of Amnesty, feared that Snowden would be at "great risk" of human rights violations if forcibly transferred to the United States, and urged no country to return Snowden to the US. Michael Bochenek, Director of Law and Policy at Amnesty International deplored the US pressure on governments to block Snowden's asylum attempts, saying "It is his unassailable right, enshrined in international law".

Human Rights Watch said that if Snowden were able to raise the issue of NSA mass surveillance without facing espionage charges, he would not have left the United States in the first place. Human Rights Watch writes that any country where Snowden seeks asylum should consider his claim fairly and protect his rights under international law, which recognizes that revealing official secrets is sometimes justified in the public interest.

Navi Pillay, the United Nations High Commissioner for Human Rights, said: "Snowden's case has shown the need to protect persons disclosing information on matters that have implications for human rights, as well as the importance of ensuring respect for the right to privacy".

Transparency International, International Association of Lawyers against Nuclear Arms and Vereinigung Deutscher Wissenschaftler awarded Snowden the German Whistleblowerpreis 2013.

The Humanist Union awarded him the Fritz Bauer Prize 2013.

=== Whistleblowers ===
Daniel Ellsberg, the whistleblower and leaker of the top-secret Pentagon Papers in 1971, stated in an interview with CNN that he thought Snowden had done an "incalculable" service to his country and that his leaks might prevent the United States from becoming a surveillance state. He said Snowden had acted with the same sort of courage and patriotism as a soldier in battle. In an op-ed the following morning, Ellsberg added that "there has not been in American history a more important leak than Edward Snowden's release of NSA material ... including the Pentagon Papers." Ray McGovern, a retired CIA officer turned political activist, agreed with Ellsberg and added, "This time today I'm feeling much more hopeful for our democracy than I was feeling this time yesterday."

William Binney, a whistleblower who disclosed details of the NSA's mass surveillance activities, said that Snowden had "performed a really great public service to begin with by exposing these programs and making the government in a sense publicly accountable for what they're doing." After Snowden cited a conversation with a "reliable source" about allegations that the US was "hacking into China", Binney felt he was "transitioning from whistle-blower to a traitor."

Thomas Drake, former senior executive of NSA and whistleblower, said that he feels "extraordinary kinship" with Snowden. "What he did was a magnificent act of civil disobedience. He's exposing the inner workings of the surveillance state. And it's in the public interest. It truly is."

WikiLeaks founder Julian Assange hailed Snowden as a "hero" who has exposed "one of the most serious events of the decade – the creeping formulation of a mass surveillance state." After charges against Snowden were revealed, Assange released a statement asking people to "step forward and stand with" Snowden. Following President Obama's assurances that changes are planned for the NSA surveillance program, Assange said in a written statement that Obama had "validated Edward Snowden's role as a whistle-blower".

Shamai Leibowitz, who leaked details about an FBI operation, said that the legal threats and "smear campaign" against Snowden are a "grave mistake" because "If the government really wanted to keep more secrets from coming out, they would do well to let this man of conscience go live his life in some other country."

In October 2013, four US whistleblowers and activists visited Moscow to present Snowden with an award for truth-telling titled The Sam Adams Award for Integrity in Intelligence.
