= Helga Seibert =

German judge

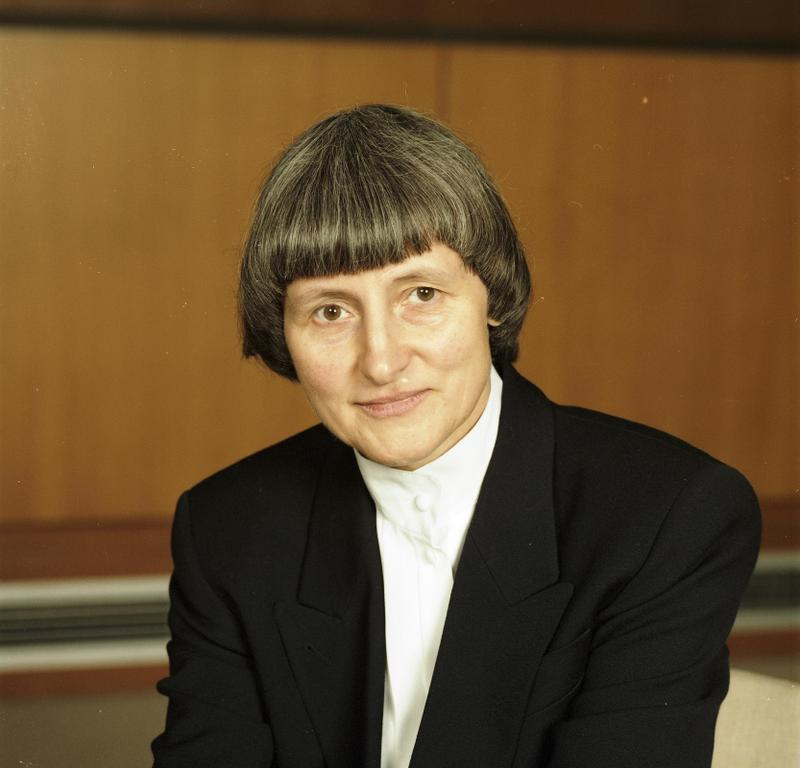

Justice of the Federal Constitutional Court of Germany
- In office 28 November 1989 – 28 September 1998

Helga Seibert (7 January 1939 – 12 April 1999) was a German judge. She was a judge in the Federal Constitutional Court of Germany. She was born in Witzenhausen, and died in Munich.

Shortly before her death she won the Fritz Bauer Prize from the Humanist Union. The explanatory memorandum stated; "The fact that a civil rights organization honors a supreme judge, may seem unusual, but it is for your work towards the specific benefits of dealing with fundamental rights."
