= Presidium of the Bundestag =

Responsible for the routine administration of the Bundestag

The Presidium of the Bundestag is responsible for the routine administration of the Bundestag, including its clerical and research activities. The presidium consists of the President of the Bundestag and varying number of Vice Presidents, currently four.

== Composition ==
The presidium is elected by the Bundestag at its first meeting after an election; by tradition, the largest faction in the Bundestag has the right to nominate a candidate for the post of president. On the first two ballots, a nominee needs a majority of all Bundestag members in order to be elected; on the third ballot a plurality (more yes than no votes) is sufficient. The president's term ends with the end of the legislature, but they can be re-elected, as long as they are re-elected as member of the Bundestag and, de facto, as long as their faction remains the largest.

Besides the president, the presidium also includes a varying number of vice presidents, who are also elected at the first session of each legislative period (according to the same majority-conditions).

Until 1994, the number and distribution of Vice Presidents among the factions was not regulated in the standing rules, but was negotiated at the beginning of each legislative session. In the 1st Bundestag (1949–1953), two Vice Presidents were elected, one each for the second and third largest factions (SPD and FDP); in the 2nd Bundestag (1953–1957), three Vice Presidents were elected, with the three largest factions each providing one (CDU/CSU, SPD and FDP). In the 3rd Bundestag (1957–1961), the same procedure was initially followed, but later the fourth-largest faction (DP/FVP) was also granted a Vice President. From the 4th to the 9th Bundestag (1961–1983), only three factions were represented in Parliament (CDU/CSU, SPD and FDP); during this period, the custom developed of electing four Vice Presidents, with the second-largest faction providing two and the others one each. This was maintained in the 10th, 11th and 12th Bundestag (1983–1994), although further factions were again represented with Alliance 90/The Greens and (from the 12th Bundestag) the PDS. Although these factions put forward their own candidates for the presidium, they had no chance due to the agreement of the other factions.

At the beginning of the 13th Bundestag (1994–1998), the election of the Vice Presidents was then regulated in the standing rules: Since then, the number of vice presidents to be elected must be at least equal to the number of factions, and each faction has the right to propose a candidate for one of the positions, against whom no opposing candidate can be brought forward. However, each individual vice president must still be elected by the entire house. If a faction fails to nominate a candidate who receives majority support, it cannot fill its seat on the Presidium, which then remains vacant. Since first entering the Bundestag in 2017, the far-right AfD faction's candidates for the presidium have never been elected. They filed a lawsuit against this regulation, which the Federal Constitutional Court upheld in 2022; the court clarified that the factions have a right to nominate for positions in the presidium, but that this nomination is subject to the condition of election.

Optionally, the Bundestag can decide to elect additional vice presidents. Since 1994, this has happened twice; in the 16th Bundestag (2005–2009), the SPD was allowed to nominate a second Vice President following inter-party agreement; in the 18th Bundestag (2013–2017), the CDU/CSU and SPD-factions were each allowed to nominate a second Vice President.

The standing rules of the Bundestag also stipulate that in the event of the absence or vacancy of the entire Presidium, the President by right of age shall chair the session. Up to and including the 18th Bundestag (2013–2017), this was the oldest member; since the 19th Bundestag (2017–2021), it has been the longest-serving member of the Bundestag. This rule is of particular relevance in the first session of each legislative term until the election of the President.

== 1st Bundestag (1949–1953) ==
President	Period	Faction
Erich Köhler; Hermann Ehlers	7 September 1949 – 18 October 1950; 19 October 1950 – 6 October 1953	CDU/CSU; CDU/CSU
Vice President	Period	Faction
Carlo Schmid Hermann Schäfer	7 September 1949 – 6 October 1953 7 September 1949 – 6 October 1953	SPD FDP
President by right of age	Period	Faction
Paul Löbe	7 September 1949 – 6 October 1953	SPD

Erich Köhler resigned as President of the Bundestag on 18 October 1950 in the wake of cross-party criticism of his conduct of office. Hermann Ehlers was elected as his successor on 19 October.

== 2nd Bundestag (1953–1957) ==
President	Period	Faction
Hermann Ehlers; Eugen Gerstenmaier	6 October 1953 – 29 October 1954; 16 November 1954 – 15 October 1957	CDU/CSU; CDU/CSU
Vice President	Period	Faction
Richard Jaeger Carlo Schmid Herrmann Schäfer; Ludwig Schneider Max Becker	6 October 1953 – 15 October 1957 6 October 1953 – 15 October 1957 6 October 1953 – 28 October 1953; 28 October 1953 – 15 October 1957 4 July 1956 – 15 October 1957	CDU/CSU SPD FDP; FDP (1953–1956), FVP/DP (1956–1957) FDP
President by right of age	Period	Faction
Konrad Adenauer	6 October 1953 – 15 October 1957	CDU/CSU

Konrad Adenauer refrained from presiding over the opening session due to his position as Chancellor. Therefore, the second oldest member, Marie Elisabeth Lüders (FDP, 1878–1966), presided over the opening session until the election of the president was concluded.

Hermann Ehlers died on 29 October 1954. On 16 November 1954, Eugen Gerstenmaier was elected to the vacant post.

As Ludwig Schneider left the FDP parliamentary group on February 23, 1956 during the legislative period to co-found the FVP, Max Becker (FDP) was elected to the presidency unopposed on July 4, 1956. As Ludwig Schneider did not resign, the number of vice presidents increased to four.

== 3rd Bundestag (1957–1961) ==
President	Period	Faction
Eugen Gerstenmaier	15 October 1957 – 17 October 1961	CDU/CSU
Vice President	Period	Faction
Richard Jaeger Carlo Schmid Max Becker; Thomas Dehler Victor-Emanuel Preusker	15 October 1957 – 17 October 1961 15 October 1957 – 17 October 1961 15 October 1957 – 29 July 1960; 28 September 1960 – 17 October 1961 23 April 1958 – 4 October 1960	CDU/CSU SPD FDP; FDP DP/FVP
President by right of age	Period	Faction
Konrad Adenauer	15 October 1957 – 17 October 1961	CDU/CSU

Konrad Adenauer refrained from presiding over the opening session due to his position as Chancellor. Therefore, the second oldest member, Marie Elisabeth Lüders (FDP, 1878–1966), presided over the opening session until the election of the president was concluded. On 18 April 1958 President of the Bundestag Eugen Gerstenmaier had to give up the chairmanship of the session without one of the Vice Presidents being present at the time. Kurt Pohle, the fifteenth oldest and oldest member present at the time, took over the chairmanship for a short time until Vice President Carlo Schmid arrived and replaced him.

== 4th Bundestag (1961–1965) ==
President	Period	Faction
Eugen Gerstenmaier	17 October 1961 – 19 October 1965	CDU/CSU
Vice President	Period	Faction
Richard Jaeger Carlo Schmid Erwin Schoettle Thomas Dehler	17 October 1961 – 19 October 1965 17 October 1961 – 19 October 1965 17 October 1961 – 19 October 1965 17 October 1961 – 19 October 1965	CDU/CSU SPD (1st) SPD (2nd) FDP
President by right of age	Period	Faction
Konrad Adenauer	17 October 1961 – 19 October 1965	CDU/CSU

Konrad Adenauer refrained from presiding over the opening session due to his position as Chancellor. Therefore, the second oldest member, Robert Pferdmenges (CDU/CSU, 1880–1962), presided over the opening session until the election of the president was concluded.

== 5th Bundestag (1965–1969) ==
President	Period	Faction
Eugen Gerstenmaier; Kai-Uwe von Hassel	19 October 1965 – 31 January 1969; 5 February 1969 – 20 October 1969	CDU/CSU; CDU/CSU
Vice President	Period	Faction
Richard Jaeger; Maria Probst; Richard Jaeger Carlo Schmid; Karl Mommer Thomas Dehler; Walter Scheel Erwin Schoettle	19 October 1965 – 26 October 1965; 9 December 1965 – 1 May 1967; 11 May 1967 – 20 October 1969 19 October 1965 – 1 December 1966; 14 December 1966 – 20 October 1969 19 October 1965 – 21 July 1967; 8 September 1967 – 20 October 1969 19 October 1965 – 20 October 1969	CDU/CSU; CDU/CSU; CDU/CSU SPD (1st); SPD (1st) FDP; FDP SPD (2nd)
President by right of age	Period	Faction
Konrad Adenauer; Arthur Enk	19 October 1965 – 19 April 1967; 19 April 1967 – 20 October 1969	CDU/CSU; CDU/CSU

== 6th Bundestag (1969–1972) ==
President	Period	Faction
Kai-Uwe von Hassel	20 October 1969 – 13 December 1972	CDU/CSU
Vice President	Period	Faction
Carlo Schmid Richard Jaeger Liselotte Funcke Hermann Schmitt-Vockenhausen	20 October 1969 – 13 December 1972 20 October 1969 – 13 December 1972 20 October 1969 – 13 December 1972 20 October 1969 – 13 December 1972	SPD (1st) CDU/CSU FDP SPD (2nd)
President by right of age	Period	Faction
William Borm	20 October 1969 – 13 December 1972	FDP

== 7th Bundestag (1972–1976) ==
President	Period	Faction
Annemarie Renger	13 December 1972 – 14 December 1976	SPD
Vice President	Period	Faction
Hermann Schmitt-Vockenhausen Kai-Uwe von Hassel Liselotte Funcke Richard Jaeger	13 December 1972 – 14 December 1976 13 December 1972 – 14 December 1976 13 December 1972 – 14 December 1976 13 December 1972 – 14 December 1976	SPD CDU/CSU (1st) FDP CDU/CSU (2nd)
President by right of age	Period	Faction
Ludwig Erhard	13 December 1972 – 14 December 1976	CDU/CSU

== 8th Bundestag (1976–1980) ==
President	Period	Faction
Karl Carstens; Richard Stücklen	14 December 1976 – 31 May 1979; 31 May 1979 – 4 November 1980	CDU/CSU; CDU/CSU
Vice President	Period	Faction
Richard Stücklen; Richard von Weizsäcker Annemarie Renger Liselotte Funcke; Richard Wurbs Hermann Schmitt-Vockenhausen; Georg Leber	14 December 1976 – 31 May 1979; 21 June 1979 – 4 November 1980 14 December 1976 – 4 November 1980 14 December 1976 – 23 November 1979; 28 November 1979 – 4 November 1980 14 December 1976 – 2 August 1979; 12 September 1979 – 4 November 1980	CDU/CSU; CDU/CSU SPD (1st) FDP; FDP SPD (2nd); SPD (2nd)
President by right of age	Period	Faction
Ludwig Erhard; Johann Baptist Gradl	14 December 1976 – 5 May 1977; 5 May 1977 – 4 November 1980	CDU/CSU; CDU/CSU

== 9th Bundestag (1980–1983) ==
President	Period	Faction
Richard Stücklen	4 November 1980 – 29 March 1983	CDU/CSU
Vice President	Period	Faction
Annemarie Renger Richard von Weizsäcker; Heinrich Windelen Richard Wurbs Georg Leber	4 November 1980 – 29 March 1983 4 November 1980 – 21 March 1981; 2 April 1981 – 29 March 1983 4 November 1980 – 29 March 1983 4 November 1980 – 29 March 1983	SPD (1st) CDU/CSU; CDU/CSU FDP SPD (2nd)
President by right of age	Period	Faction
Herbert Wehner	4 November 1980 – 29 March 1983	SPD

== 10th Bundestag (1983–1987) ==
President	Period	Faction
Rainer Barzel; Philipp Jenninger	29 March 1983 – 25 October 1984; 5 November 1984 – 18 February 1987	CDU/CSU; CDU/CSU
Vice President	Period	Faction
Richard Stücklen Annemarie Renger Richard Wurbs; Dieter-Julius Cronenberg Heinz Westphal	29 March 1983 – 18 February 1987 29 March 1983 – 18 February 1987 29 March 1983 – 13 December 1984; 14 December 1984 – 18 February 1987 29 March 1983 – 18 February 1987	CDU/CSU SPD (1st) FDP; FDP SPD (2nd)
President by right of age	Period	Faction
Egon Franke	29 March 1983 – 18 February 1987	SPD

Egon Franke refrained from presiding over the opening session of the 10th Bundestag as he was under investigation for embezzlement at the time (he was later acquitted). The function was assumed by the next oldest member of parliament, Willy Brandt (SPD, 1913–1992).

== 11th Bundestag (1987–1990) ==
President	Period	Faction
Philipp Jenninger; Rita Süssmuth	18 February 1987 – 11 November 1988; 25 November 1988 – 20 December 1990	CDU/CSU; CDU/CSU
Vice President	Period	Faction
Richard Stücklen Annemarie Renger Dieter-Julius Cronenberg Heinz Westphal	18 February 1987 – 20 December 1990 18 February 1987 – 20 December 1990 18 February 1987 – 20 December 1990 18 February 1987 – 20 December 1990	CDU/CSU SPD (1st) FDP SPD (2nd)
President by right of age	Period	Faction
Willy Brandt	18 February 1987 – 20 December 1990	SPD

== 12th Bundestag (1990–1994) ==
President	Period	Faction
Rita Süssmuth	20 December 1990 – 10 November 1994	CDU/CSU
Vice President	Period	Faction
Hans Klein Helmuth Becker Dieter-Julius Cronenberg Renate Schmidt	20 December 1990 – 10 November 1994 20 December 1990 – 10 November 1994 20 December 1990 – 10 November 1994 20 December 1990 – 10 November 1994	CDU/CSU SPD (1st) FDP SPD (2nd)
President by right of age	Period	Faction
Willy Brandt; Alfred Dregger	20 December 1990 – 8 October 1992; 8 October 1992 – 10 November 1994	SPD; CDU/CSU

== 13th Bundestag (1994–1998) ==
President	Period	Faction
Rita Süssmuth	10 November 1994 – 26 October 1998	CDU/CSU
Vice President	Period	Faction
Hans Klein; Michaela Geiger Hans-Ulrich Klose Burkhard Hirsch Antje Vollmer	10 November 1994 – 26 November 1996; 16 January 1997 – 26 October 1998 10 November 1994 – 26 October 1998 10 November 1994 – 26 October 1998 10 November 1994 – 26 October 1998	CDU/CSU; CDU/CSU SPD FDP Alliance 90/The Greens
President by right of age	Period	Faction
Stefan Heym; Alfred Dregger	10 November 1994 – 31 October 1995; 31 October 1995 – 26 October 1998	PDS; CDU/CSU

Hans Klein died on 26 November 1996. On 16 January 1997, Michaela Geiger was elected to the vacant post. The election of Michaela Geiger resulted in the first majority female presidium of the Bundestag.

== 14th Bundestag (1998–2002) ==
President	Period	Faction
Wolfgang Thierse	26 October 1998 – 17 October 2002	SPD
Vice President	Period	Faction
Anke Fuchs Rudolf Seiters Hermann Otto Solms Antje Vollmer Petra Bläss	26 October 1998 – 17 October 2002 26 October 1998 – 17 October 2002 26 October 1998 – 17 October 2002 26 October 1998 – 17 October 2002 26 October 1998 – 17 October 2002	SPD CDU/CSU FDP Alliance 90/The Greens PDS
President by right of age	Period	Faction
Fred Gebhardt; Hans-Eberhard Urbaniak	26 October 1998 – 16 August 2000; 16 August 2000 – 17 October 2002	PDS; SPD

== 15th Bundestag (2002–2005) ==
President	Period	Faction
Wolfgang Thierse	17 October 2002 – 18 October 2005	SPD
Vice President	Period	Faction
Susanne Kastner Norbert Lammert Hermann Otto Solms Antje Vollmer	17 October 2002 – 18 October 2005 17 October 2002 – 18 October 2005 17 October 2002 – 18 October 2005 17 October 2002 – 18 October 2005	SPD CDU/CSU FDP Alliance 90/The Greens
President by right of age	Period	Faction
Otto Schily	17 October 2002 – 18 October 2005	SPD

== 16th Bundestag (2005–2009) ==
President	Period	Faction
Norbert Lammert	18 October 2005 – 27 October 2009	CDU/CSU
Vice President	Period	Faction
Gerda Hasselfeldt Wolfgang Thierse Susanne Kastner Hermann Otto Solms Katrin Göring-Eckardt Petra Pau	18 October 2005 – 27 October 2009 18 October 2005 – 27 October 2009 18 October 2005 – 27 October 2009 18 October 2005 – 27 October 2009 18 October 2005 – 27 October 2009 7 April 2006 – 27 October 2009	CDU/CSU SPD (1st) SPD (2nd) FDP Alliance 90/The Greens The Left
President by right of age	Period	Faction
Otto Schily	18 October 2005 – 27 October 2009	SPD

== 17th Bundestag (2009–2013) ==
President	Period	Faction
Norbert Lammert	27 October 2009 – 22 October 2013	CDU/CSU
Vice President	Period	Faction
Gerda Hasselfeldt; Eduard Oswald Wolfgang Thierse Hermann Otto Solms Katrin Göring-Eckardt Petra Pau	27 October 2009 – 16 March 2011; 23 March 2011 – 22 October 2013 27 October 2009 – 22 October 2013 27 October 2009 – 22 October 2013 27 October 2009 – 22 October 2013 27 October 2009 – 22 October 2013	CDU/CSU; CDU/CSU SPD FDP Alliance 90/The Greens The Left
President by right of age	Period	Faction
Heinz Riesenhuber	27 October 2009 – 22 October 2013	CDU/CSU

== 18th Bundestag (2013–2017) ==
President	Period	Faction
Norbert Lammert	22 October 2013 – 24 October 2017	CDU/CSU
Vice President	Period	Faction
Johannes Singhammer Peter Hintze; Michaela Noll Edelgard Bulmahn Ulla Schmidt Petra Pau Claudia Roth	22 October 2013 – 24 October 2017 22 October 2013 – 26 November 2016; 19 January 2017 – 24 October 2017 22 October 2013 – 24 October 2017 22 October 2013 – 24 October 2017 22 October 2013 – 24 October 2017 22 October 2013 – 24 October 2017	CDU/CSU (1st) CDU/CSU (2nd); CDU/CSU (2nd) SPD (1st) SPD (2nd) The Left Alliance 90/The Greens
President by right of age	Period	Faction
Heinz Riesenhuber; Wolfgang Schäuble	22 October 2013 – 1 June 2017; 1 June 2017 – 24 October 2017	CDU/CSU; CDU/CSU

The CDU/CSU Vice President Peter Hintze died on 26 November 2016. On 19 January 2017, Michaela Noll was elected to the vacant post.

On 1 June 2017, the Bundestag changed its standing rules to the effect that the President by right of age was no longer the oldest member in terms of years of life, but the longest-serving member. At the time, this was Wolfgang Schäuble, born 1942 and a member of the Bundestag since 1972.

== 19th Bundestag (2017–2021) ==
President	Period	Faction
Wolfgang Schäuble	24 October 2017 – 26 October 2021	CDU/CSU
Vice President	Period	Faction
Hans-Peter Friedrich Thomas Oppermann; Dagmar Ziegler Wolfgang Kubicki Petra Pau Claudia Roth	24 October 2017 – 26 October 2021 24 October 2017 – 25 October 2020; 26 November 2020 – 26 October 2021 24 October 2017 – 26 October 2021 24 October 2017 – 26 October 2021 24 October 2017 – 26 October 2021	CDU/CSU SPD; SPD FDP The Left Alliance 90/The Greens
President by right of age	Period	Faction
Wolfgang Schäuble	24 October 2017 – 26 October 2021	CDU/CSU

Wolfgang Schäuble, MdB since 1972, refrained from presiding over the opening session of the 19th Bundestag as he stood for election as president of the Bundestag and did not want to preside over his own election. The function was assumed by the next longest-serving member of parliament, Hermann Otto Solms (FDP, MdB 1980–2013 and 2017–2021).

The SPD's Vice President Thomas Oppermann died on 25 October 2020, Dagmar Ziegler was elected to the vacant post.

The AfD was represented in the 19th Bundestag with faction status and had the right to nominate a vice president. However, during the entire legislative period none of the proposed candidates achieved the necessary majority.

== 20th Bundestag (2021–2025) ==
President	Period	Faction
Bärbel Bas	26 October 2021 – 25 March 2025	SPD
Vice President	Period	Faction
Aydan Özoğuz Yvonne Magwas Claudia Roth; Katrin Göring-Eckardt Wolfgang Kubicki Petra Pau	26 October 2021 – 25 March 2025 26 October 2021 – 25 March 2025 26 October 2021 – 8 December 2021; 9 December 2021 – 25 March 2025 26 October 2021 – 25 March 2025 26 October 2021 – 25 March 2025	SPD CDU/CSU Alliance 90/The Greens; Alliance 90/The Greens FDP The Left
President by right of age	Period	Faction
Wolfgang Schäuble; Peter Ramsauer	26 October 2021 – 26 December 2023; 26 December 2023 – 25 March 2025	CDU/CSU; CDU/CSU

Claudia Roth resigned her post as vice president on 8 December 2021 upon entering office as State Minister and Federal Commissioner for Culture and the Media. Katrin Göring-Eckardt, who already had served as vice president in the 16th and 17th Bundestag, was elected to the post one day later, on 9 December 2021.

The AfD was represented in the 20th Bundestag with faction status and had the right to nominate a vice president. However, during the entire legislative period none of the proposed candidates achieved the necessary majority.

== 21st Bundestag (2025–) ==
President	Period	Faction
Julia Klöckner	25 March 2025 –	CDU/CSU
Vice President	Period	Faction
Andrea Lindholz Josephine Ortleb Omid Nouripour Bodo Ramelow	25 March 2025 – 25 March 2025 – 25 March 2025 – 25 March 2025 –	CDU/CSU SPD Alliance 90/The Greens The Left
President by right of age	Period	Faction
Gregor Gysi	25 March 2025 –	The Left

The presidium of the 21st Bundestag is the first since that of the 1st Bundestag, none of whose members had previously served in the presidium.

The AfD is represented in the 21st Bundestag with faction status and has the right to nominate a vice president. However, as of April 2025, no candidate has received the necessary majority.
