= Helga Einsele =

German criminologist, prison director and prisons reformer

- Born: Helga Marianne Freda Hackmann; June 9, 1910; Dölau (Halle), Saxony, Prussia, Germany
- Died: February 13, 2005 (aged 94); Frankfurt am Main, Hesse, Germany
- Education: Königsberg; Breslau; Heidelberg
- Occupations: Jurist; Criminologist; Prison director Criminal justice reform activist
- Spouse: Prof. Dr. Wilhelm Einsele (1904-1966)
- Children: Nele Löw Beer (25 August 1941 - 2 March 2015) freelance journalist & games designer
- Father: Dr. Friedrich Hackmann

Helga Einsele (born Helga Hackmann: 9 June 1910 - 13 February 2005) was a German criminologist, prison director and high-profile prisons reformer.

== Life and works ==
=== Provenance and early years ===
Helga Marianne Freda Hackmann was born into a liberally minded family in Dölau on the edge of Halle in Saxony. She was the elder of her parents' two daughters. During the first part of her childhood the family lived at Torgau, a little town on the banks of the Elbe to the east of Halle. The family later relocated in connection with her father's work. Dr. Friedrich Hackmann worked as a secondary school teacher, returning in 1923 to the school at which he had started his career in 1906, having accepted a position as "school director". He was removed from his headship ten years later by the Hitler government in October 1933), following a protracted dispute with the Hitler Youth organisation. Helga's mother was an early advocate of women's emancipation. Helga Hackmann grew up in Lüneburg, where she and her younger sister Erdmuthe attended their father's school, the Johanneum (Gymnasium) in the city centre. Completing her schooling in 1929, she moved on to study Jurisprudence at the universities of Königsberg, Breslau (since 1945 "Wrocław") and Heidelberg. Her university career was interrupted by an eighteen month stay, during 1931/32, in New York: the visit was undertaken in the company of a Heidelberg graduate student, whose trip was being funded by a bursary from Columbia University. Helga Hackmann had originally gotten to know the biology student Wilhelm Einsele (1904-1966) through their shared political involvement. Her studies in New York were complemented by a period of practical social work with women of the New York Police Department. Later, during the 1930s, she would draw on the notes and experiences from her time in New York for her doctorate.

=== Law student at Heidelberg ===
As a law student at Heidelberg, after "overcoming [her] bourgeois scruples", she soon joined socialist student groups. She was taught and powerfully influenced by the politician-professor Gustav Radbruch, a former Justice Minister, and one of the intellectual heavy-weights of the Social Democratic Party. She was particularly affected by Radbruch's intense concern with the political and social problems affecting and impacted by the justice system. It was from him that she acquired her deep conviction that reform of criminal justice was not enough: a completely new approach to law breaking was necessary. In the context of the 1930s, long before the reform of penal institutions and acceptance on the part of government and society of the rehabilitative function of the prison system, many of the ideas she shared with Radbruch must have seemed more than Utopian, but they would remain an important strand in Helga Hackmann's professional life for more than half a century during which some of them came to be seen as progressively less outlandish. She passed her Level 1 national law exams in 1935, gaining a distinction. Under most circumstances that would have opened the way for a traineeship in the government justice service, but in Hitler's Germany she was unable to follow that path. Two grounds were given: "as a married woman, such a course would be unsuitable for her, and her political attitudes made her admission to government service undesirable". Helga Hackmann had married Wilhelm Einsele in 1931, during their time together in New York City.

=== Government imposed career deferral ===
Helga Einsele's completion of her doctorate seems to have been delayed until 1938, when Wilhelm Einsele obtained a job as a Fisheries Biology Manager at Langenargen in the extreme south-west of Germany. Legislation passed in 1933 meant that Helga Einsele was not permitted to work in the discipline for which she was qualified, and during the mid-1930s the couple were obliged to focus their energies on making ends meet. When she had started preparing her doctoral dissertation, her supervisor had been her mentor Gustav Radbruch, but he had been removed from his university post in 1933 under the terms of government legislation intended (among other things) to remove high-profile political opponents from public office. By 1935, Radbruch was in Oxford, England, and Herbert Engelhard had taken over as Helga Einsele's doctoral supervisor. (Note: Herbert Engelhard was an academic colleague and friend of Gustav Radbruch whose future career prospects, due to his refusal to join the party looked bleak after 1933. But he continued to lecture in criminal law and coach students for their exams at Heidelberg University till his health failed him during the early 1940s.) Forbidden from working in the German legal system, she was able to complete and submit her doctoral dissertation while living with her husband on the shores of Lake Constance, eventually receiving her doctorate (apparently remotely) from Heidelberg University in 1939. Her doctoral dissertation was entitled "Das Frauengericht in New York" (loosely, "Women's Courts in New York").

=== War years ===
By that time, they had moved again. During 1938, Wilhelm and Helga left Konstanz and settled in a remote Mountain village in Austria, which remained a separate country till March 1938. Here, they remained, sitting out fascism and war, till 1945. Their daughter Nele was born in 1941.

=== 1945 ===
After the war ended in 1945, Helga Einsele returned with her daughter to Germany, making her home in the American occupation zone at Frankfurt am Main.

Wilhelm Einsele remained in Austria, where he had established a small research institute of his own at Kreuzstein (Mondsee), and was building a reputation for his scholarly insights into inland fisheries management. Through her old tutor, Gustav Radbruch, Helga Einsele met Radbruch's friend, Fritz Bauer, who would soon become both a friend and a professional colleague. Over the next couple of decades she would frequently assist Bauer, sharing in his denazification work.

=== Prison director and prisons reformer ===
Radbruch and Bauer had both established formidable reputations as academic jurists before 1933 and they returned in 1945, well networked within the post-war political establishment in what became, in May 1949, the German Federal Republic (West Germany). It was partly thanks to the contacts and recommendations of these two former law professors that in 1947, Helga Einsele found herself faced with two competing job offers in Frankfurt am Main. Faced with the choice between taking charge of the police department or of the large women's prison in Frankfurt-Preungesheim, Einsele chose the prison job. She had, according to one source, already been picked out for it by Georg-August Zinn, who had emerged from an American prisoner of war camp, a respected and experienced legal academic untainted by Nazism, to be appointed in October 1945 as Justice Minister for the newly established (and soon to be renamed) Greater Hesse region. Einsele remained in charge of the prison at Preungesheim for twenty-eight years, till her retirement from the post in 1975. During that period, she came to public attention as a very public champion for a radically more "humanized" ethos in the West German penal system. She became well known for introducing "ground-breaking reforms" in prisoners' living conditions at the Preungesheim prison. Her work led subsequently to major reforms in the living conditions of women prisoners across the country.

Einsele's reform agenda at Preungesheim did not go unresisted. In 1947, she took over a prison in which most of the prison officers had been on duty under National Socialism. The idea that there might be - and was - such a thing as a "born criminal type" was a deeply ingrained underlying assumption. When first she suggested that prison officers and prisoners should attend her lecture together, and that the prisoners should be seated for the event rather than being left to stand while the officers sat, the institution became "a witches cauldron". Prisoner officers found it unreasonable. They found the new prison director and her ideas "weird". But such resistance only fuelled Einsele's convictions that there had to be a better way. Radbruch had taught her that Germany did not need a better criminal justice system, but something better than a criminal justice system". (Note: "Nicht ein besseres Strafrecht, sondern etwas, das besser ist als Strafrecht.") She never forgot it. When a prisoner became so frustrated and enraged that she defecated in the middle of the floor of her cell, the prison director personally cleared up the mess, hoping both to shame the prisoner into not doing it again, and to make clear that she was not going to be fazed by a pile of shit. The prisoner repeated the performance, with the added embellishment of smearing excrement on the cell walls. Again, Einsele personally cleaned the mess away. The woman did not repeat her performance a third time.

With the support of Hilda Heinemann, whose husband was the West German president at the time, Helga Einsele became the first West German prison director to install a "mother and child" unit in a prison, launching an agenda-setting experiment whereby female offenders were no longer obliged automatically to hand their babies and children over to a state orphanage at the start of a prison sentence. Another important reform involved instructing prison staff to treat prisoners with respect. Traditionally prisoners had been addressed with the familiar pronoun "du" (thee/thou/tu), implying inferior status; while prison staff had expected to be addressed by those in their charge as "Sie" (ye/you/vous) implying superior status. Einsele caused consternation in some quarters by instructing prisoner staff to address prisoners with the more respectful "Sie" pronoun. Where possible, she included the prisoners themselves in any decision process affecting daily prison life, and she also institutionalised this consultative approach by supporting the creation of representative bodies or "prisoner councils". According to at least one source Einsele also extended to inmates the right to wear "normal clothing" and allocated a social worker to each of them. She also pioneered the provision of certain therapeutic treatments and backed the establishment if self-help groups by prisoners. It was largely as a result of statistical evidence correlating Einsele's reforms with reduced recidivism rates, that interest in her ideas extended both throughout Hesse and far beyond the state boundaries.

=== Recognition ===
Fritz Bauer died unexpectedly in July 1968. The Humanist Union, of which Bauer had been a co-founder, established the annually awarded Fritz Bauer Prize to celebrate his memory. In 1969, Helga Einsele became the first recipient. That was only one of a number of awards and other marks of esteem that Einsele received because of her efforts, over many years, to create a humane prisons system in West Germany. In 1976, she received the irregularly awarded Humanitarian Prize of the German Freemasons. In 1979, she was a recipient of the Wilhelm Leuschner Medal, awarded by the State of Hessen.

=== Retirement ===
Helga Einsele retired from her position with the prisons service in 1975, having reached the age of 65 and was appointed that same year to an honorary professorship in Criminology at the Goethe University of Frankfurt. The honorary professorship was no sinecure. She conducted seminars at the university, published articles in specialist journals and as contributions to lexicons. She remained a campaigner, delivering speeches in support of "points of contact for women who have fallen foul of the criminal justice system" and many other, mainly human, issues with links to criminology. She also worked at the "mother and child" unit in Preungesheim prison. Although, as one affectionate obituarist recalled, she loved to discuss over a cup of tea with those who came to visit her, she also found time to complete her autobiography, "Mein Leben mit Frauen in Haft" (loosely, "My life with imprisoned women"), which was published in 1995.

=== Death ===
Helga Einsele died at Frankfurt on 13 February 2010. Her daughter and grandson were with her.

== Socialist politics ==
In 1953, Helga Einsele "re-joined" the Social Democratic Party. Although it is unclear whether she had ever found time actually to become a mainstream party member as a university student before the transformation of Germany into a one-party dictatorship, she had certainly involved herself with socialist student groups at university and been heavily influenced by the former SPD government minister Gustav Radbruch. That had been sufficient to mark her out for career blocking government measures during the 1930s. She herself told an interviewer in 1970 that she had been "kicked out of the judiciary by the Nazis" ("von den Nazis 1935 aus dem Justizdienst geworfen") because of her membership of the "Sozialistischer Studentenbund", which appears to have been one of a number of locally organised social democrat student group with close links to the (since 1933 outlawed) Social Democratic Party.

Following a decade during which the "socialist paradise" of East Germany came to be seen as no more than a front for anti-democratic Soviet imperialism, while West Germany experienced a sustained "economic miracle", and the conservative chancellorship of Konrad Adenauer - or something very like it - seemed likely to endure for ever, the left-of-centre Social Democratic Party (SPD) finally came up with a plan designed to make itself electable in the democratic part of Germany. The Godesberger Programme repudiated Marxism and set aside many other left-wing tenets associated with the party's history. After nearly eight years in the making, a new programme was presented to a special meeting of party activist members, held in the town hall at Bad Godesberg during three days in November 1959. There was no more talk of socialisation or even of the working class. When a vote was taken, just sixteen comrades voted against the Godesberger Programme. One of them was cast by a delegate sent from Wolfgang Abendroth's Frankfurt party branch, Helga Einsele.

A burning political issue of the time involved West German rearmament and the positioning (and/or use) in Germany of nuclear weapons. Einsele was uncomfortable with re-armament, while the SPD of the Godesberger Programme, keen to avoid charges of political extremism and pro-Kremlin tendencies, generally sought to avoid public internal wranglings on the issue. Where that proved impossible, the party leadership lined up uncomfortably behind the conservatives, just as they had in 1914. When the affiliated Socialist German Student League ("Sozialistischer Deutscher Studentenbund" / SDS) came out in open opposition to rearmament, it was the SDS that had to go. The party leadership demanded that party members who were also members of the SDS should resign their SDS memberships. Those who combined membership of both organisations were, in most cases, university professors, many of whom would hitherto have been seen as non-dogmatic leftists. They included respected jurists such as Wolfgang Abendroth from Frankfurt, Ossip K. Flechtheim from Cologne and Heinz-Joachim Heydorn. From within the party, Helga Einsele and other set up a support group for the SDS. The party leadership demanded her resignation from the support group. When she refused, she was herself expelled from the party, by means of an angry-formal letter signed by party secretary Willi Wiedemann. (Note: "Frau Dr. Helga Einsele, Sie haben dem Frankfurter Parteivorstand mitgeteilt, daß Sie entgegen der Forderung des Bundesvorstandes, nicht bereit sind, aus der Förderergesellschaft des SDS auszutreten. Mit dieser Entscheidung verlieren Sie Ihre Mitgliedschaft in der SPD. Ein Einspruch gegen den Ausschluß ist nicht möglich. Ihr Parteibuch ist Eigentum der Partei und ist bis zum Freitag in der Frankfurter Parteizentrale abzugeben....) It turned out that Wiedemann's letter had been a standard text sent to a number of party colleagues: Helga Einsele was in good company. Other recipients included Wolfgang Abendroth, Helmut Gollwitzer, Ossip K. Flechtheim, Fritz Lamm, Walter Fabian, and Heinz Brakemeier.

Far from fading away after being disowned by the SPD, the SDS continued to flourish as a focus of extra-parliamentary opposition. Although it's underlying political objectives were broadly aligned with Helga Einsele's views on a number of topics, it was in respect of anti-war activism that Einsele most obviously found herself on the same side of relevant political fences as the SDS. Retirement from the prison service gave her more time for politics. After 1975, declaring herself a "democratic socialist", she participated in noisy opposition to the deployment of SS-20 missiles in "White Russia" and Ukraine, west of the Urals and, after 1979, in the surging peace movement across West Germany, opposing the deployment there of US Pershing II missiles between 1979 and 1991. In 1980, by this time aged 70, she was one of those arrested during a "peaceful blockade" of the Mutlanger Heath US army base, as part of an ultimately unsuccessful attempt to prevent the delivery to the base of nuclear missiles. (They arrived in 1983.) She was tried and convicted under a charge of Coercion ("Nötigung"), but avoided the headline-grabbing indignity of a prison sentence in the state institution of which, till five year before, she had been the director. Instead she received a fine.

Another issue in respect of which the eighty-year old was often to be found marching alongside street demonstrators one or several generations her junior was Paragraph 218 of the country's penal code (Strafgesetzbuch). Helga Einsele was not a fan of West Germany's pre-reunification abortion laws.
