= Fritz Bauer Prize =

The Fritz Bauer Prize (German: Fritz Bauer-Preis) is a prize awarded by the Humanist Union, established in 1968 in memory of its founder, Fritz Bauer, the longtime Attorney General of Hesse. The Humanist Union presents the award to those who have excelled in contributions to the humanization, liberalization and democratization of the judiciary.

Since 2013, the Fritz Bauer Prize for Social Engagement has also been awarded by the Eberhard-Ludwigs-Gymnasium, where Bauer completed his secondary education. This prize was initiated by the jurist Herta Däubler-Gmelin.

In 2014, the German Federal Minister of Justice Heiko Maas established the Fritz Bauer Study Prize for Human Rights and Contemporary Legal History, awarded for doctoral theses in law that address Fritz Bauer, his work, or related themes. The prize is awarded every two years by the Federal Ministry of Justice and Consumer Protection.

== Recipients ==
- 1969 Helga Einsele
- 1970 Gustav Heinemann
- 1971 Birgitta Wolf
- 1972 Emmy Diemer-Nicolaus
- 1973 Heinrich Hannover
- 1975 Helmut Ostermeyer
- 1976 Werner Hill
- 1977 Heinz D. Stark
- 1978 Gerald Grünwald
- 1980 Peggy Parnass
- 1981 Ulrich Vultejus
- 1982 Ruth Leuze
- 1983 Erich Küchenhoff
- 1984 Ulrich Finckh
- 1985 Rosi Wolf-Almanasreh
- 1986 Ossip K. Flechtheim
- 1988 Eckart Spoo
- 1990 Liselotte Funcke
- 1993 Erwin Fischer
- 1995 Hans Lisken
- 1996 Hanne Vack und Klaus Vack
- 1997 Günter Grass
- 1999 Helga Seibert
- 2000 Regine Hildebrandt
- 2003 Dieter Schenk
- 2004 Susanne von Paczensky
- 2006 Burkhard Hirsch
- 2008 Klaus Waterstradt
- 2010 Helmut Kramer
- 2012 Joachim Perels
- 2014 Edward Snowden
- 2016 Gefangenen-Gewerkschaft/Bundesweite Organisation
- 2018 Hans-Christian Ströbele
- 2021 netzpolitik.org
- 2023 Complainants against the Climate Protection Act
