= Norbert Lammert =

German politician (born 1948)

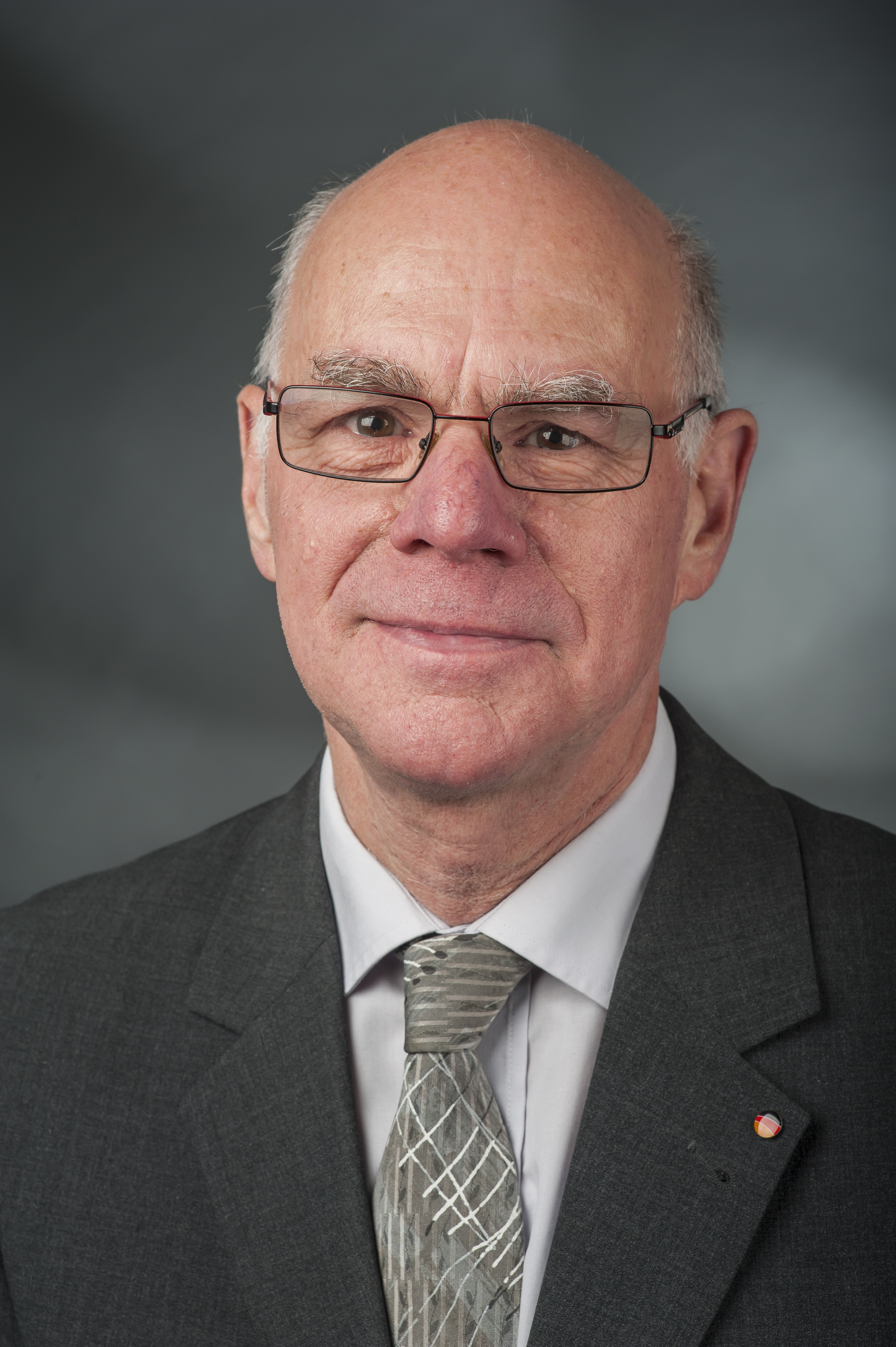
- Lammert in 2014

Chair of the Konrad Adenauer Foundation
- In office 1 December 2018 – 1 January 2026
- General Secretary: Michael Thielen; Mark Speich
- Preceded by: Hans-Gert Pöttering
- Succeeded by: Annegret Kramp-Karrenbauer

President of the Bundestag
- In office 18 October 2005 – 24 October 2017
- Preceded by: Wolfgang Thierse
- Succeeded by: Wolfgang Schäuble

Vice President of the Bundestag (on proposal of the CDU/CSU-group)
- In office 17 October 2002 – 18 October 2005
- President: Wolfgang Thierse
- Preceded by: Rudolf Seiters
- Succeeded by: Gerda Hasselfeldt

Parliamentary State Secretary in the Ministry of Transport
- In office 15 May 1997 – 26 October 1998
- Chancellor: Helmut Kohl
- Minister: Matthias Wissmann
- Preceded by: Manfred Carstens
- Succeeded by: Achim Großmann

Parliamentary State Secretary in the Ministry for Economic Affairs
- In office 17 November 1994 – 15 May 1997
- Chancellor: Helmut Kohl
- Minister: Günter Rexrodt
- Preceded by: Reinhard Göhner
- Succeeded by: Heinrich Leonhard Kolb

Parliamentary State Secretary in the Ministry for Education and Science
- In office 21 April 1989 – 17 November 1994
- Chancellor: Helmut Kohl
- Minister: Heinz Riesenhuber; Matthias Wissmann
- Preceded by: Irmgard Karwatzki
- Succeeded by: Bernd Neumann

Member of the Bundestag for North Rhine-Westphalia
- In office 4 November 1980 – 24 October 2017
- Preceded by: multi-member district
- Succeeded by: multi-member district

Personal details
- Born: 16 November 1948 (age 78) Bochum, British occupation zone, Allied-occupied Germany (now North Rhine-Westphalia, Germany)
- Party: Christian Democratic Union (1966–)
- Spouse: Gertrud
- Children: 4
- Education: Ruhr University Bochum
- Occupation: Politician; Academic
- Website: Official website

Norbert Lammert (born 16 November 1948) is a German politician of the Christian Democratic Union (CDU). He served as the 12th president of the Bundestag from 2005 to 2017.

== Early life and education ==
The son of a baker, Lammert attended gymnasium in Bochum where he studied classics. He obtained his abitur in 1967. He carried out military service in the Bundeswehr from 1967 to 1969. Following his military service he enrolled at the Ruhr University Bochum, which included a period abroad at the University of Oxford, where he studied political science and modern history. He obtained his doctorate (Dr. rer. soc.) from the Ruhr University Bochum in 1975.

== Political career ==
Having joined the CDU in 1966, he was deputy chairman of the Bochum branch of the CDU. From 1978 to 1984, he was deputy leader of a part (Westfalen-Lippe) of the North Rhine-Westphalian branch of the Junge Union, the CDU youth organization. In the 1980 national elections, he was elected to the Bundestag and kept his mandate continuously until stepping down in 2017. During his tenure in the Bundestag he served (as usual for all MPs) on several committees.

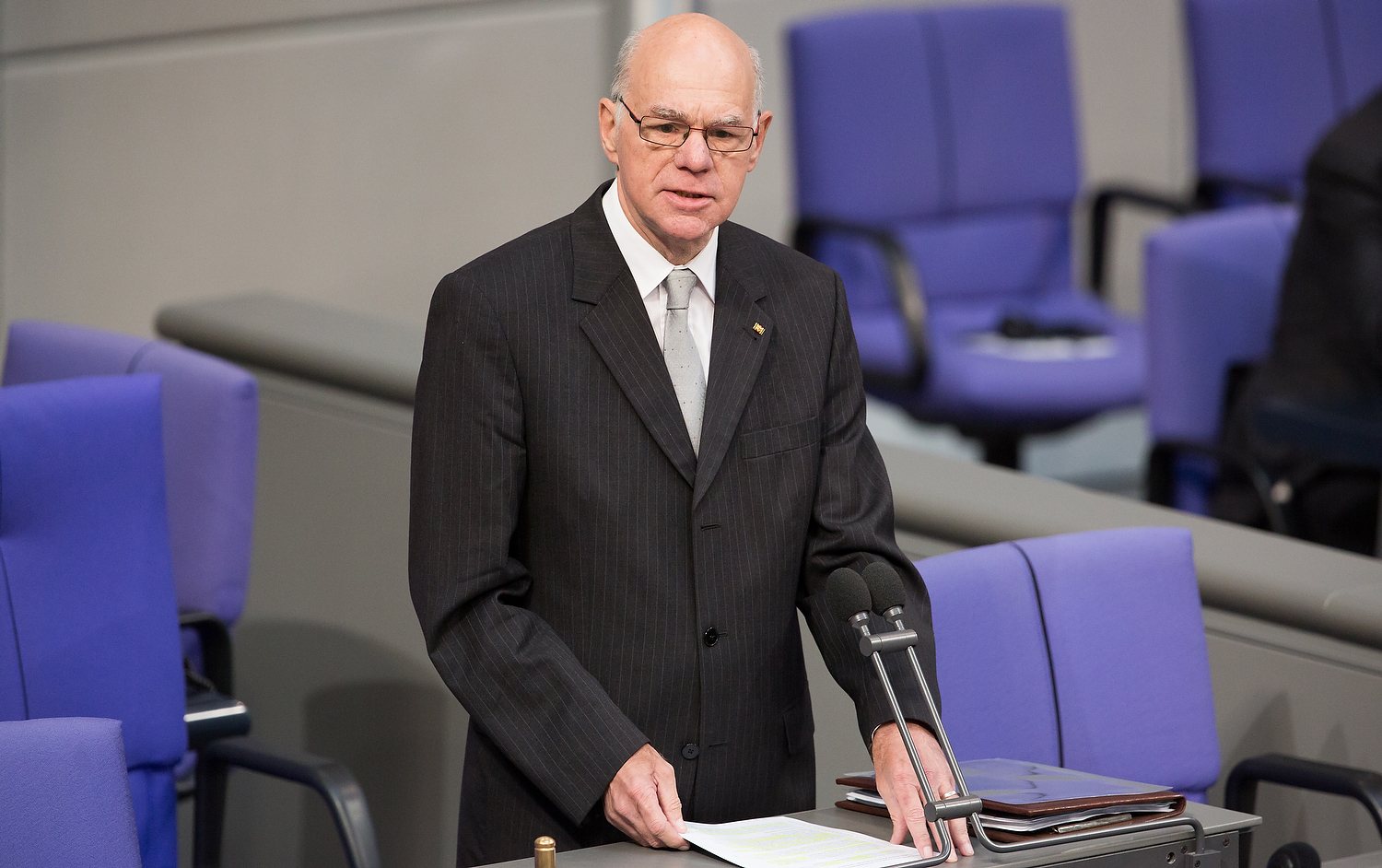
Norbert Lammert in the German Bundestag, 2014

Following the 2005 federal elections in which the CDU became the strongest party and formed a grand coalition with the Social Democratic Party (SPD), Lammert was elected by the Bundestag on 18 October 2005 to replace Wolfgang Thierse of the SPD as its President. Lammert received 564 of 607 votes cast, including most of the SPD's votes. He was reelected to this post by the 17th Bundestag after the 2009 federal election with a similarly good result. In his capacity as president, he chairs the parliament's Council of Elders, which – among other duties – determines daily legislative agenda items and assigning committee chairpersons based on party representation. Lammert's tenure in office gained him recognition across party lines as he was determined to uphold the honor and importance of the federal parliament while at the same time displaying a dry, sophisticated sense of humor most notably in exchanges with then-chairmen of Die Linke Gregor Gysi.

In the negotiations to form a Grand Coalition of the Christian Democrats (CDU together with the Bavarian CSU) and the SPD following the 2013 federal elections, Lammert was part of the CDU/CSU delegation in the working group on cultural and media affairs, led by Michael Kretschmer and Klaus Wowereit.

When Federal President Joachim Gauck announced in June 2016 that he would not stand for reelection, Lammert was soon mentioned by German and international media as likely successor.

In October 2016, Lammert announced that he would not stand in the 2017 federal elections and resign from active politics by the end of the parliamentary term.

== Later career ==
In 2018, Lammert took on the role of chairman of the Konrad Adenauer Foundation (KAS).

Since 2022, following an appointment by Chancellor Olaf Scholz, Lammert has been serving on a three-member panel (alongside Krista Sager and Andreas Voßkuhle) to assess potential conflicts of interest, requiring senior German officials from the chancellor to deputy ministers to observe a cooling-off period if they want to quit the government for a job in business.

== Political positions ==
=== Role of the parliament ===
Throughout his tenure, Lammert has not shied from speaking out against the government about potential threats to parliament's role. He became widely respected for upholding parliamentarians' rights, including leading the way in condemning the 1915 Armenian massacres as a Turkish genocide in 2016. In 2011, he questioned why the Bundestag had not been consulted on Chancellor Angela Merkel's decision to close all nuclear plants following Fukushima Daiichi nuclear disaster. He has insisted that members of parliament be consulted fully on the bailout schemes for the euro zone debt crisis.

=== European integration ===
In 2012, Lammert said he wants a financial transaction tax to be introduced in as many countries as possible, "at least" in the Eurozone. Later that year, he demanded that the EU not take in new members for the time being because of the European debt crisis and also expressed doubts that Croatia was ready to join; Croatia eventually joined the EU in 2013.

=== Human rights ===
Following the Charlie Hebdo shooting in 2015, Lammert criticized Saudi Arabia for condemning the Paris attacks as a violation of Islam, "then two days later letting the blogger Raif Badawi be flogged in public in Jeddah for insulting Islam". Ahead of Egyptian president Abdel Fattah el-Sisi's first official visit to Germany in June 2015, Lammert announced that he would not meet the former army chief, citing "an unbelievable number of death sentences".

In February 2016, Lammert visited the Zaatari refugee camp in Jordan to learn more about the plight of Syrians fleeing the violence in the ongoing Syrian civil war that erupted in 2011.

In June 2017, Lammert voted against Germany's introduction of same-sex marriage.

== Controversy ==
=== Party financing ===
In December 2010, Lammert imposed a fine of €1.2 million ($1.6 million) on the CDU for breaching party donation rules, for party funding violations in the western state of Rhineland-Palatinate at the time of the regional election in 2006.

=== Plagiarism allegations ===
In July 2013, an anonymous internet blogger, using the name of Robert Schmidt, accused Lammert of having plagiarized other works when writing his dissertation. Lammert rejected this reproach and asked the University of Bochum to check his dissertation; he also published it via internet. High-ranking politicians of the Social Democratic Party (SPD) and of the German Green Party underlined that there should be no condemnation in advance. In November 2013 the university finished a thorough investigation and came to the conclusion that, although the dissertation contained "avoidable shortcomings in the citations", those did not constitute plagiarism.

== Other activities ==
=== Corporate boards ===
- RAG AG, Member of the Supervisory Board
- RAG-Stiftung, Member of the Board of Trustees (2017–2022)
- Evonik Industries, Member of the supervisory board (2005–2007)
- RTL Television, Member of the Program Committee (1998–2007)

=== Non-profit organizations ===
- Deutsche Nationalstiftung, Member of the Senate
- Konrad Adenauer Prize, Member of the Advisory Board
- Kunsthistorisches Institut in Florenz (KHI), Member of the Board of Trustees
- Federal Cultural Foundation, ex-officio Member of the Board of Trustees
- Goethe-Institut, Member of the General Meeting
- Institute for Advanced Study, Member of the Board of Trustees (2009–2013)
- Konrad Adenauer Foundation, chairman of the Board of Directors
- Memorial to the Murdered Jews of Europe, chairman of the Board of Trustees
- musikFabrik, Member of the Board of Trustees
- Norbert Lammert Foundation, chairman of the Board of Trustees
- Ruhrfestspiele, Member of the Supervisory Board
- Ruhr University Bochum, Member of the Board of Trustees (2002–2008)

== Recognition ==
- 2019 – Hans Ehrenberg Prize

== Personal life ==
Lammert is member of the Catholic Church. He is married to Gertrud and has four children.

== Literature ==
- Michael F. Feldkamp, ed. (2007). Der Bundestagspräsident. Amt - Funktion - Person. Vol. 16. München: Wahlperiode. ISBN 978-3-7892-8201-0.

Political offices
Preceded by Wolfgang Thierse	President of the Bundestag; 2005–2017	Succeeded by Wolfgang Schäuble
Preceded by Hans-Gert Pöttering	Chairman of the Konrad Adenauer Foundation; 2018–present	Incumbent
