= Herbert Schnoor =

German politician and lawyer (1927–2021)

Minister of the Interior of North Rhine-Westphalia
- In office 4 June 1980 – 17 July 1995

Head of the Staatskanzlei des Landes Nordrhein-Westfalen
- In office 4 June 1975 – 4 June 1980

Personal details
- Born: 1 June 1927 Aurich, Germany
- Died: 20 June 2021 (aged 94) Werder, Germany
- Party: SPD

Herbert Schnoor (1 June 1927 – 20 June 2021) was a German politician and lawyer.

== Biography ==
Schnoor was born in Aurich on 1 June 1927. In 1944, he was conscripted into the Reich Labour Service before a brief stint in the military in World War II. After the war, he studied law, earning his doctorate in 1959. He began working in the government of North Rhine-Westphalia in the Ministry of Land and the Ministry of Culture. He also spent a brief time in the Federal Ministry of Health. For one year, he was director of personnel in North Rhine-Westphalia's Ministry of the Interior.

Schnoor joined the Social Democratic Party of Germany (SPD) in 1965. He was appointed State Secretary for Science and Research of North Rhine-Westphalia in 1970 by Heinz Kühn. Five years later, he was appointed head of the Staatskanzlei des Landes Nordrhein-Westfalen. Following SPD victories in the region in 1980, he succeeded Burkhard Hirsch to become Minister of the Interior. During his tenure, he followed moderate policies and rejected the use of force. In doing so, he allocated political popularity for himself and became one of the most energetic members in the cabinet of Minister-President Johannes Rau. However, he was criticized for his response to violence which occurred during a visit by United States President George H. W. Bush. He also drew backlash for his handling of the Gladbeck hostage crisis, when he did not use anti-terrorist resources available to him and delayed police deployment. In February 1989, at the request of the Christian Democratic Union of Germany, he appeared before a parliamentary commission in Düsseldorf regarding the case. However, he retained his position until July 1995. He was notably welcoming of Yazidis into North Rhine-Westphalia and traveled to Turkey in 1989 to give a report on the minority's persecution.

Following his resignation, Schnoor worked as a lawyer. He died on 20 June 2021 at the age of 94.

== Distinctions ==
- Gustav-Heinemann-Bürgerpreis (1989)
- Order of Merit of North Rhine-Westphalia (1997)
- Order of Merit of Brandenburg (2010)
