= Liselotte Funcke =

German politician (1918–2012)

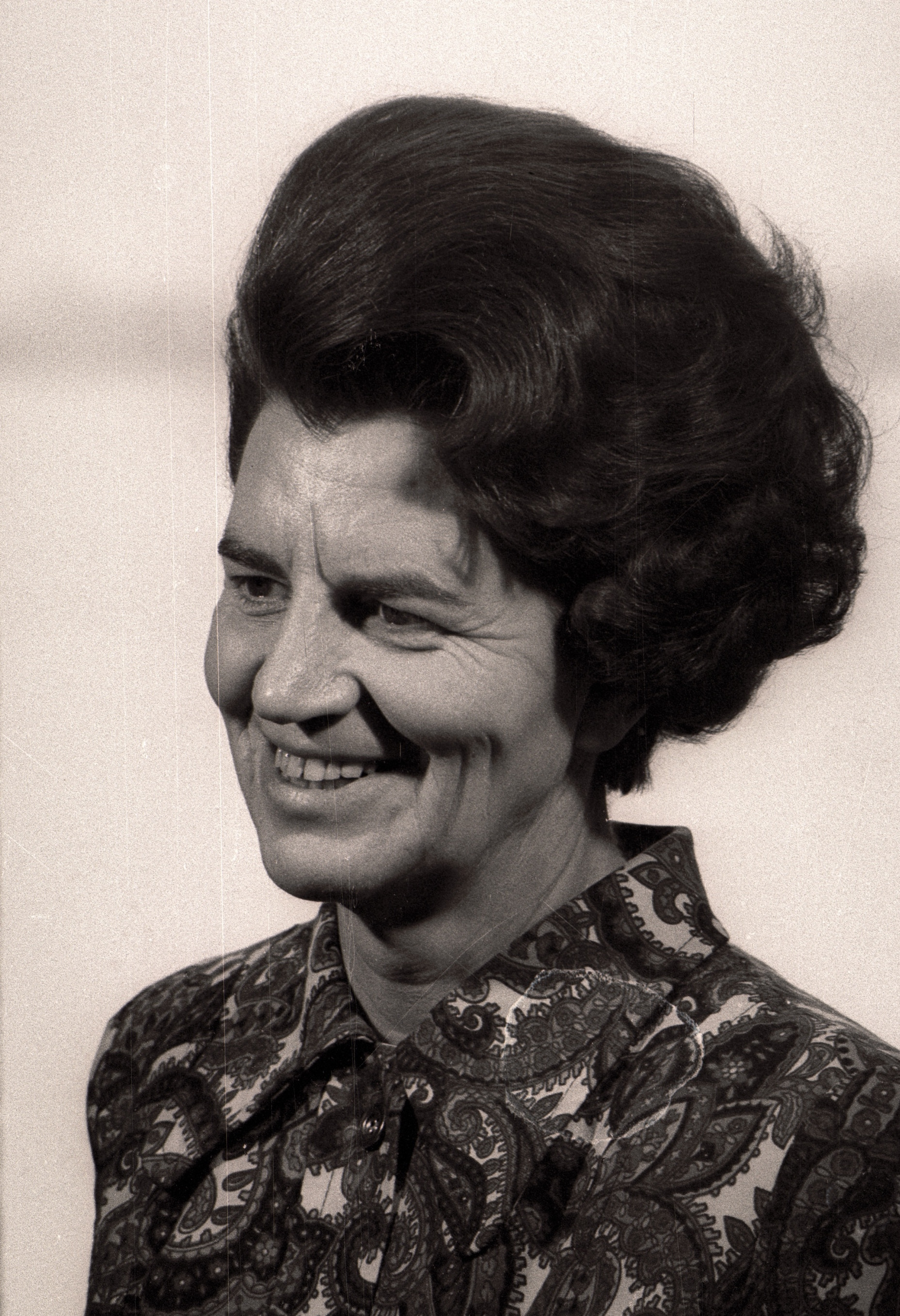
- Liselotte Funcke in 1974

Member of the Bundestag
- In office 17 October 1961 – 23 November 1979

Personal details
- Born: 20 July 1918 Hagen, German Empire
- Died: 1 August 2012 (aged 94) Hagen, Germany
- Party: FDP
- Occupation: Politician

Liselotte Funcke (20 July 1918 – 1 August 2012) was a German liberal politician of the Free Democratic Party (FDP). She was a member of the German Bundestag parliament from 1961 to 1979, serving as its vice president from 1969. She then was appointed state Minister of Economy in North Rhine-Westphalia, the first woman in the position. Funcke is remembered for her engagements to integrate foreigners in German society, as the Federal Commissioner for Foreigners (Ausländerbeauftragte) from 1981 to 1991, and afterwards.

== Life ==
Funcke was born in Hagen to a liberal-leaning family, the fourth child of a factory owner. Her father was member of the board and president of the Reichsverbandes der Deutschen Industrie from 1919 to 1933, and became a member of the Bundestag for the FDP in the 1950s. Her mother came from the Osthaus family of bankers. She attended the Realgymnasium, where she achieved the Abitur in 1937. She served in the Arbeitsdienst and attended the Kaufmannsschule Dortmund. She then studied Betriebswirtschaftslehre (business administration) in Berlin, where she earned her diploma in 1941. Funcke worked for three years for a Wirtschaftsprüfer (statutory auditor) in Wuppertal; from 1944 she was responsible for balance, taxes, and finance in the company Schraubenfabrik und Gesenkeschmiede Funcke & Hueck, which her great-grandfather had founded in Hagen.

Funcke's political career began after World War II, joining the FDP in 1946. She was a member of the Landtag of North Rhine-Westphalia state parliament from 1950 to 1961, when she was elected to the German Bundestag. Funcke was the parliament's vice-president from 1969 to 1979. From 1972 to 1979 she was chairman of the Bundestag's Finance Committee, having already been its deputy chairman from 1965 to 1969.

Funcke served as state Minister of Economy (Wirtschaft, Mittelstand und Verkehr) in North Rhine-Westphalia from 1979, the first woman in the position. She had to leave the post a year later because her party was no longer part of the Landtag. She was the Ausländerbeauftragte der Bundesregierung (Federal Commissioner for Foreigners) from 1981 to 1991, working for the federal government for the integration of foreigners and their families, again the first woman to hold the position. She understood the position as "interpreter" of the problems of the foreigners, especially the large group of Turkish workers who brought their families with them; it earned her the respectful name Mutter der Türken (Mother of the Turks), and she continued to serve their interests in public after her official term.

Funcke died in Hagen at the age of 94.

== Publications ==
- Liselotte Funcke, ed. (1979). Frauen sprechen im Bundestag, Verlag Bonn Aktuell, Stuttgart. Verlag Bonn Aktuell. ISBN 978-3-87959-111-4.
- Liselotte Funcke, ed. (1984). Frei sein, um andere frei zu machen. Frauen in der Politik. Die Liberalen. Stuttgart/Herford: Seewald Verlag. ISBN 978-3-512-00707-1.
- Hagener Straßen erzählen Geschichte(n). Hagen: Ardenkuverlag. 1999. ISBN 978-3-932070-16-7.
- Hagener Industriebetriebe. Tuche, Sensen, Federn, Stahl. Hagen: Ardenkuverlag. 2003. ISBN 978-3-932070-44-0.
- Wo unsere Großeltern einkauften – Hagener Einzelhandel. Hagen: Ardenkuverlag. 2009. ISBN 978-3-932070-92-1.
- 265 Jahre Bürgermeister der Stadt Hagen. Hagen: Ardenkuverlag. 2011. ISBN 978-3-942184-17-5.

== Awards ==
- 1973: Order of Merit of the Federal Republic of Germany
- 1975: Wolfgang Döring Medal
- 1975: Grand Cross of the Order of Merit of the Federal Republic of Germany
- 1984: Theodor Heuss Medal
- 1985: Grand Cross of the Spanish Order of Civil Merit
- 1986: Order of Merit of North Rhine-Westphalia
- 1987: Grand Cross of the Order of Merit (Portugal)
- 1988: Grand Officer's Cross of the Order of Merit of the Italian Republic
- 1988: Order of the Yugoslav Star with Golden Wreath
- 1990: Fritz Bauer Prize of the Humanist Union
- 1991: Heinz Herbert Karry-Preis
- 1999: Honorary doctorate of the Fernuniversität Hagen
- 2003: Alfred-Müller-Felsenburg-Preis für aufrechte Literatur
