= Hans Klein (politician) =

German politician (1931–1996)

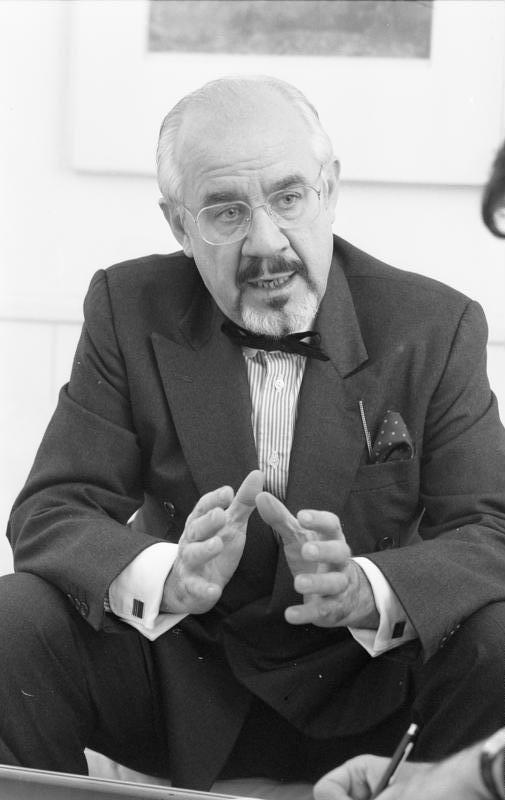
- Klein in 1990

Minister for Economic Cooperation
- In office 12 March 1987 – 21 April 1989
- Chancellor: Helmut Kohl
- Preceded by: Jürgen Warnke
- Succeeded by: Jürgen Warnke

Minister for Special Affairs
- In office 26 November 1989 – 20 December 1990
- Chancellor: Helmut Kohl
- Preceded by: Rudolf Seiters
- Succeeded by: Lothar de Maizière

Vice President of the Bundestag
- In office 20 December 1990 – 26 November 1996
- President: Rita Süssmuth

Personal details
- Born: Hans Klein; 11 July 1931 Šumperk, Czechoslovakia (now Czech Republic)
- Died: 26 November 1996 (aged 65) Bonn, North Rhine-Westphalia, Germany
- Party: Christian Social Union
- Children: 3
- Education: University of Leicester
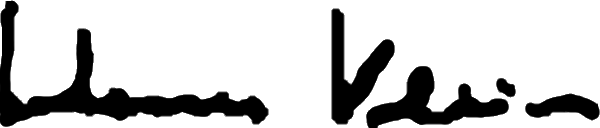
- Signature

Hans Klein (11 July 1931 – 26 November 1996) was a German politician (CSU) who served as Vice President of the Bundestag from 1990 until his death in 1996.

Klein had previously served as Minister for Special Affairs from 1989 to 1990 and as Minister for Economic Cooperation from 1987 to 1989 both in Helmut Kohl's third cabinet.
