= Peggy Parnass =

German-Swedish actress and writer (1927–2025)

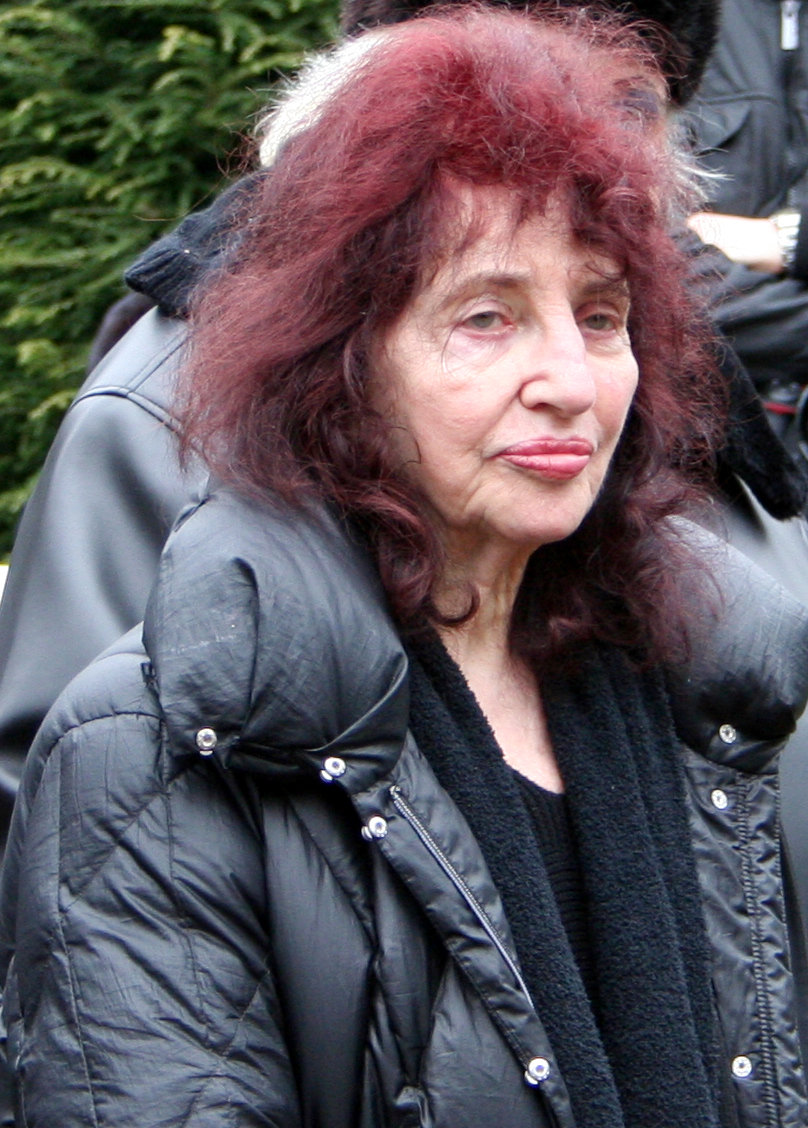
Peggy Parnass in 2009

Ruth Peggy Sophie Parnass (11 October 1927 – 12 March 2025) was a German-Swedish actress, columnist, court reporter, short story writer and non-fiction writer who lived in Hamburg.

== Life and career ==
Born in Hamburg on 11 October 1927, she was the daughter of Herta Emanuel and Simon, a Polish Jew from Tarnopol. Both were sent by the Nazis to the Treblinka extermination camp where they died in 1942. Parnass tells the story of her childhood in Unter die Haut (1983) and in Kindheit (2014), illustrated by Tita do Rêgo Silva. She and her little brother Gady had been sent to Sweden in 1939. Separated from her brother, she lived in 12 different families until, towards the end of the Second World War, she was sent to London to stay with an uncle, the only surviving member of the family. After spending three years there, she returned to Stockholm, completing her studies in Hamburg and Paris. Her brother went to Israel.

Although she had vowed never to live in Germany again, after returning to Hamburg to visit her cousin, she met many interesting left-wing antifascists and decided to stay. For 17 years, she worked for the magazine Konkret, where she reported on the proceedings of the Berlin law courts. Her work forms the basis of her widely acclaimed Prozesse (Trials), published in 1978, for which she received the Joseph Drexel Prize in 1979 for outstanding achievements in journalism.

Parnass died on 12 March 2025, at the age of 97.

== Awards ==
Parnass received several awards including:

- 1980: Fritz Bauer Prize
- 1998: Biermann-Ratjen-Medaille
- 2008: Order of Merit of the Federal Republic of Germany

== Selected publications ==
- Prozesse 1970–1978; Reinbek bei Hamburg: Rowohlt, 1992; ISBN 3-499-19190-3 (=Hamburg: Rasch und Röhring, 1990; ISBN 3-89136-393-1; 1. Auflage: Frankfurt am Main: Zweitausendeins, 1978)
- Interview mit Marie Marcks; in: Marie Marcks: Schöne Aussichten; Berlin: Elefantenpress, 1980; ISBN 3885200317
- Unter die Haut; Hamburg: Konkret-Literatur-Verlag, 1983; ISBN 3-922144-26-8
- Kleine radikale Minderheit; Hamburg: Konkret Literatur Verlag, 1985; ISBN 3-922144-46-2
- Süchtig nach Leben; Hamburg: Konkret Literatur Verlag, 1990; ISBN 3-922144-90-X (Autobiography)
- Mut und Leidenschaft; Hamburg: Konkret Literatur Verlag, 1993; ISBN 3-89458-121-2
- Vor- und Nachwort in: Flora Neumann: Erinnern, um zu leben. Vor Auschwitz, in Auschwitz, nach Auschwitz; Hamburg: Konkret Literatur Verlag, 2006^{3}; ISBN 3-89458-246-4
- Kindheit; Hamburg: Verlag Schwarze Kunst, 2012; ISBN 978-3-927840-43-0 (with lithographs by Tita do Rêgo Silva)

== Films ==
Parnass appeared in several films and television programmes including:

- 1965: Zwei
- 1967: Das Kriminalmuseum (1 episode)
- 1967–1968: Bürgerkrieg in Rußland (TV miniseries), as Fanny Kaplan
- 1968: Stahlnetz (1 episode)
- 1969: Kaddish for the Living
- 1980: Panic Time (cameo)
- 1985: King Kongs Faust
- 1995: Nobody Loves Me

Documentary

- 1982: Von Richtern und anderen Sympathisanten (German Film Awards)
