= Wolfgang Thierse =

German politician (born 1943)

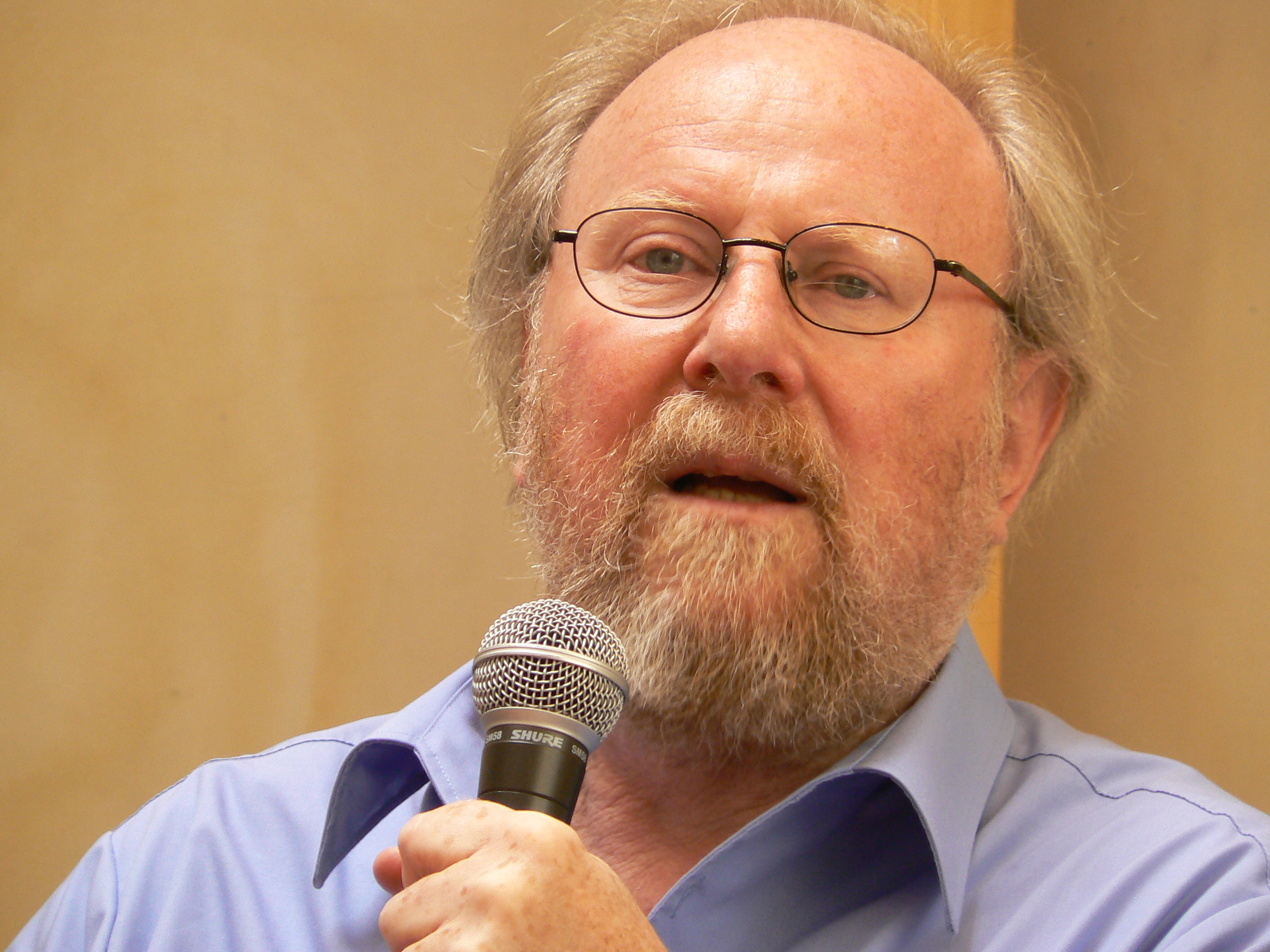
- Thierse in 2012

President of the Bundestag
- In office 26 October 1998 – 18 October 2005
- Preceded by: Rita Süssmuth
- Succeeded by: Norbert Lammert

Vice President of the Bundestag (on proposal of the SPD-group)
- In office 18 October 2005 – 22 October 2013
- President: Norbert Lammert
- Preceded by: Susanne Kastner
- Succeeded by: Edelgard Bulmahn

Deputy Leader of the Social Democratic Party
- In office 27 September 1990 – 15 November 2005
- Leader: Hans-Jochen Vogel; Björn Engholm; Johannes Rau (acting); Rudolf Scharping; Oskar Lafontaine; Gerhard Schröder; Franz Müntefering
- Preceded by: Position established
- Succeeded by: Peer Steinbrück
Parliamentary constituencies
Member of the Bundestag; from Berlin
In office 3 October 1990 – 22 October 2013
Preceded by	Constituency established
Succeeded by	Multi-member district
Constituency	Volkskammer (1990); Berlin-Mitte – Prenzlauer Berg – Weißensee I (1990–1994); State list (1994–2002); Berlin-Pankow (2002–2009); State list (2009–2013)
Member of the Volkskammer for Berlin
In office 5 April 1990 – 2 October 1990
Preceded by	Constituency established
Succeeded by	Constituency abolished

Personal details
- Born: 22 October 1943 (age 83) Breslau, Gau Lower Silesia, Nazi Germany
- Party: Social Democratic
- Other political affiliations: New Forum (1989–1990); SDP in the GDR (1990)
- Children: 2
- Education: Humboldt University of Berlin

Wolfgang Thierse (German: [ˈvɔlfɡaŋ ˈtiːɐ̯zə]; born 22 October 1943) is a German politician of the Social Democratic Party (SPD). He served as the 11th president of the Bundestag from 1998 to 2005.

== Early life and career ==
Thierse was born in Breslau (Wrocław in present-day Poland). He is a Roman Catholic and grew up in East Germany. After his Abitur, he first worked as a typesetter in Weimar and then studied the German language and literature at Humboldt University, in Berlin, where he was an active member of the Catholic Student Community. He also became a research assistant in the university's Department of Cultural Theory / Aesthetics. In 1975–76 he was employed by the Ministry of Culture of the German Democratic Republic. But when he joined the protests against the expulsion of singer-songwriter and dissident Wolf Biermann from the GDR he lost his job.

From 1977 to 1990, Thierse worked as a research assistant at the Central Institute of the History of Literature in the Academy of Arts and Sciences of the GDR. He was one of the editors of the "Historical Dictionary of Aesthetic Concepts".

== Early political career ==
Although his father had been a member of the Centre Party in the Weimar Republic and later of the Christian Democratic Union (East Germany), Wolfgang Thierse did not belong to any political party before 1990. That did not mean that he was not interested in politics. His father regularly listened to the West Berlin radio station RIAS and so Wolfgang had a chance to hear speeches from debates in the West German parliament. He was particularly impressed by Carlo Schmid, Herbert Wehner, and later Willy Brandt.

In October 1989, Thierse joined the opposition group New Forum and in January 1990 the Social Democratic Party in the GDR, whose leader he became in June. In August 1990, under Thierse's leadership, the East German Social Democratic Party quit the governing coalition, apparently denying the coalition, which was led by Christian Democrats, a ruling majority.

With regard to German reunification, Thierse was in favour of a gradual process, but he realised soon that the majority of the population of the GDR wanted to join the West German state as quickly as possible.

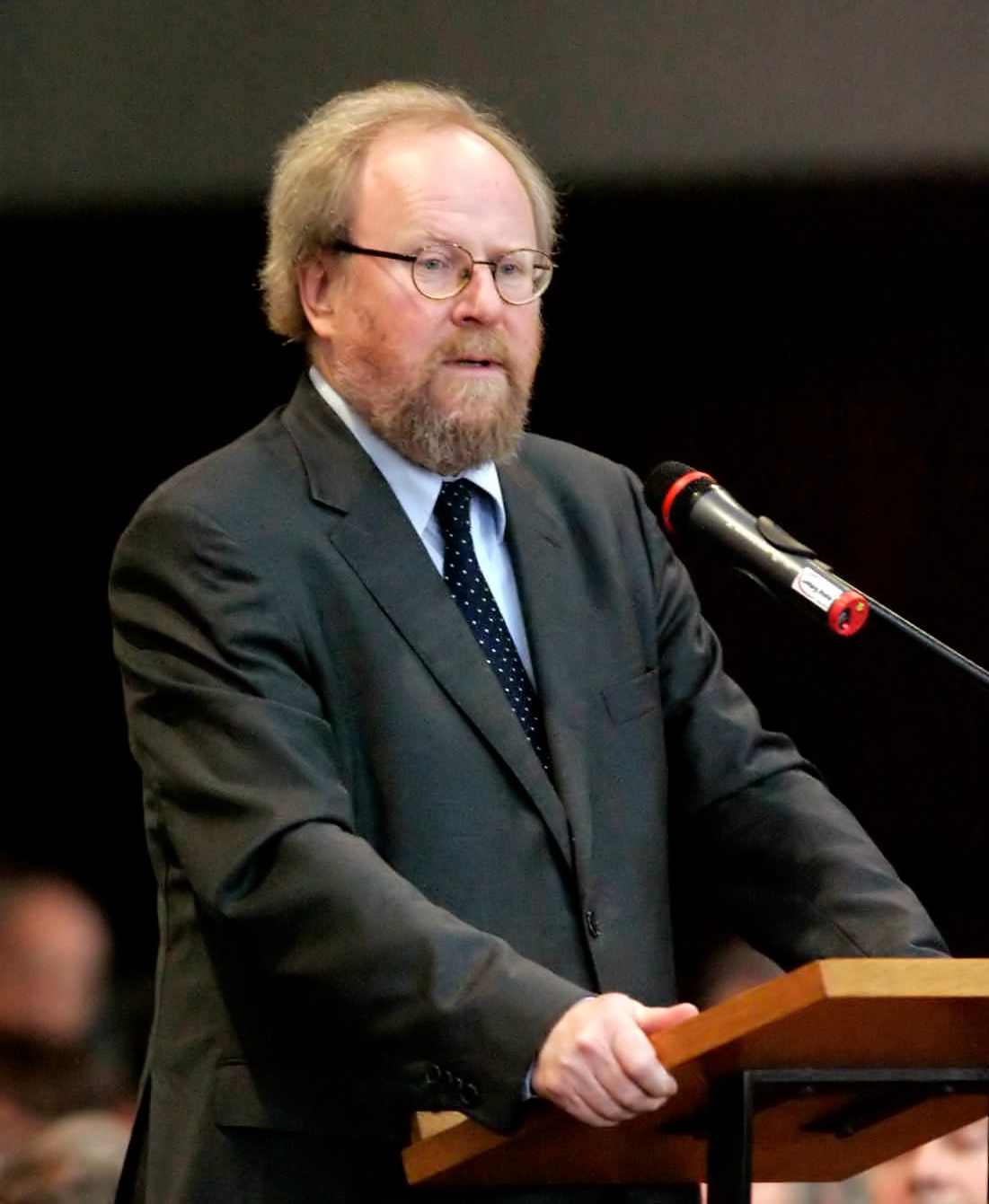
Thierse in 2005

When the East German SPD merged with the West German SPD, Thierse became the SPD's deputy leader, an office he held until 2005. Until 2009 he belonged to the SPD's national executive. He also belonged to various party commissions, which dealt with subjects like the party's basic values, or the special problems of East Germany. He was elected as a member of the East German parliament in 1990.

== Member of the German Bundestag (1990–2013) ==
Following the German reunification, Thierse served as member of the Bundestag, the lower house of the parliament of Germany. He was his parliamentary group's deputy chairman from 1994 on, under the leadership of its chairman Rudolf Scharping. From 1995 until 1998, he was a member of the committee on the Election of Judges (Wahlausschuss), which is in charge of appointing judges to the Federal Constitutional Court of Germany.

=== President of the Bundestag (1998–2005) ===
After the SPD's victory in the 1998 general elections, Thierse was elected president of the Bundestag on 26 October. That was "a historic date", as he called it, because it was the first time that a citizen of the former GDR became Germany's second-highest representative. He had not been a lifelong resistance fighter against the rule of the Socialist Unity Party of Germany and had ever identified with that rule, he said, but he represented a large majority of the East German population there. Journalists call him "the advocate of the East". He served for two terms until October 2005, when he was succeeded by Norbert Lammert. In addition, he was chairman of the German delegation to the Parliamentary Assembly of the Organization for Security and Co-operation in Europe (OSCE) from 2002 until 2009.

He has never given the impression "to be in the sole possession of truth". He considers it most important to him to "include" opponents, the "other" person, the "other" opinion. Therefore, it is necessary for speakers to put aside their manuscripts sometimes and to enter into a real dialogue with the speakers before them.

As president of the Bundestag, Thierse visited numerous countries. He has always shown a great interest in inter-cultural dialogue. In his speeches he addressed a variety of questions such as the consequences of globalization on the one hand and increasing individualization on the other, or problems of the environment.

Thierse passionately promoted the idea that the Bundestag should move to Berlin and thereby underline the process of reunification. It was highly satisfactory for him when to open its first meeting there in 1999.

In response to the CDU donations scandal in 2000, Thierse imposed a $21 million fine on former Chancellor Helmut Kohl's party for accepting illegal financing. At the time, the fine was the largest in the history of the federal republic. Thierse accused Kohl of "intentional violations of political contribution laws and the Constitution over many years."

Thierse was especially involved in the fight against right-wing extremism. He takes part in discussions, campaigns and demonstrations. He visits neo-Nazi strongholds, particularly in East Germany, and encourages people to stand up for democracy.

In 2002, Thierse demanded the abolition of checks on former Stasi employees.

=== Vice President of the Bundestag (2005–2013) ===
After the 2005 elections, Thierse was elected vice president of the Bundestag, serving alongside President Norbert Lammert. He also served on the Committee on Cultural Affairs and Media. In addition, he was a member of the Art Advisory Board of the German Bundestag.

== Other activities ==
- Action Reconciliation Service for Peace (ASF), Member of the Board of Trustees
- Central Committee of German Catholics (ZdK), Member
- Cusanuswerk, Member of the Advisory Board
- Foundation for the Humboldt Forum in the Berlin Palace, Member of the Council
- Green Helmets, Member of the Board of Trustees
- Memorial to the Murdered Jews of Europe Foundation, member of the board of trustees
- Willy Brandt Foundation, chairman of the board of trustees
- Foundation Flight, Expulsion, Reconciliation, member of the board of trustees (2010–2013)
- Freya von Moltke Foundation for the New Kreisau, member of the board of trustees (2005–2009)
- German Historical Museum (DHM), member of the board of trustees (2005–2013)
- Hertha BSC, member of the business advisory board (2005–2009)
- German Federal Cultural Foundation, member of the board of trustees (2002–2005)

== Recognition ==
Among the honours Thierse received are an honorary doctorate (awarded by the Philosophical Faculty of the University of Münster) and the Federal Cross of Merit.

== Personal life ==
Wolfgang Thierse is married with two children. He lives in Prenzlauer Berg, a north-eastern part of Berlin.

Thierse has published several books, especially about the situation in East Germany. In 2003 a CD was published with Charles Dickens' "A Christmas Carol" read by Thierse. The proceeds were for the "Green Berets", a charity that helped young Muslims and Christians to rebuild destroyed areas like Bosnia or Afghanistan.

"Peter and the Wolf" is another fairy tale read on CD by Wolfgang Thierse. Again the profit is for charity.

== Controversy ==
On 30 December 2012, Thierse caused outrage by an interview in a Berlin paper ("Berliner Morgenpost"), criticizing gentrification tendencies in formerly poor Berlin inner city districts such as Prenzlauer Berg and Kreuzberg. He specifically mentioned so called "Swabians" (German: "Schwaben") who serve as prototype for wealthy migrants from western Germany who often work in highly paid jobs in the Berlin media and culture industry, as well as government and industry organizations, replacing the original Berlin under-class population. Thierse specifically mentioned the usage of Swabian or more generally South-German terms for food like "Wecken" or "Pflaumendatschis" instead of the Berlin dialect variants for rolls or plum cakes respectively. Furthermore, those Swabians (symbolizing all migrants from the former West Germany) would be attracted by the cultural gems of Berlin and its status as chaotic, poor and sexy metropolis, but after some time in town would like to transform it in another variant of their small wealthy south German towns of origin.

Thierse received strong criticism from prominent Swabians such as Cem Özdemir (chairman of Germany's Green Party) and by European Commissioner for Energy Günther Oettinger (CDU, conservative party), as well as by fellow high-ranking SPD party members. Oettinger pointed out that the Berlin state would only be a viable state because of Germany's internal rescue fund ("Länderfinanzausgleich") which is mainly financed by the two German states that comprise parts of the historic region of Swabia, namely Baden-Württemberg and Bavaria, and in addition by Hesse. The state of Berlin is by far the main beneficiary of this rescue fund.

Some commentators (inter alia, Germany's Stern magazine) even raised accusations against Thierse of discrimination against large parts of the West German population. Germany's Federal minister for Economic Cooperation, Dirk Niebel (FDP, liberal party), born and raised in Hamburg but representing a south-western constituency around Heidelberg, called Thierse furiously in a public reaction reported by the news magazine "Focus", a "pietistischer Zickenbart" ("pietistic bitchy greybeard").

On 1 January 2013, Thierse re-affirmed his previous statements in the Berlin paper "Tagesspiegel": He called the public criticism "ridiculous", mentioned that intra-German migrants should be allowed to use their South German dialects only in their states/regions of origin and furthermore talked about an "Organisierte Schwabenschaft" (roughly "Organized Swabians") that would have appeared in the nationwide media and that would abuse its influence. In particular this term "Organisierte Schwabenschaft" caused significant outrage, especially in West Germany, since the usage and wording resembled to the usage of similarly sounding racist terms by right-wing extremists against immigrants and religious minorities. According to the weekly "Die Zeit" magazine, Thierse would have de-masked himself as a "babbit" who did serious harm to the gentrification debate by introducing ethnic terms and regional prejudice into the public discussion.

Prominent former TV host and political correspondent Ulrich Kienzle accused Thierse in an emotional personal letter to him of talking nonsense and artificially intensifying a deeply rooted rivalry between South Germans and Prussians that would date back to even before the Battle of Königgrätz where Prussian forces defeated Austria and its South German allies. This victory eventually led to the Prussia-dominated German Empire in 1870–1871.

In an online essay for Der Spiegel, Jan Fleischhauer pointed out that so called "Schwaben-Hass" (discrimination or hatred vs Swabians) would be a politically correct variant of xenophobia for left-wing intellectuals and bohemians used to hide respectively camouflage otherwise totally unacceptable political positions against foreign infiltration or domination by immigrants.

For reconciliatory efforts, Thierse received a "Goldene Narrenschelle", an order of Carneval from Vereinigung Schwäbisch-Alemannischer Narrenzünfte (VSAN), an umbrella organization of Swabian–Alemannic Fastnacht.

== Selected publications ==
- (Hg.): Arbeit ist keine Ware. Herder, Freiburg im Breisgau [u.a.] 2009, ISBN 978-3-451-30290-9.
- (Hg.): Grundwerte für eine gerechte Weltordnung. Eine Denkschrift der Grundwertekommission der SPD zur internationalen Politik. Suhrkamp, Frankfurt am Main 2003, ISBN 3-518-06720-6.
- Zukunft Ost. Perspektiven für Ostdeutschland in der Mitte Europas. Rowohlt, Berlin 2001, ISBN 3-87134-442-7.
- mit Avraham Burg: Das Parlament in der deutschen und in der israelischen Demokratie. Friedrich-Ebert-Stiftung, Herzliya 2000.
- "Ernst Barlachs Plastik "Der Schwebende" zwischen Ost und West". In: Barlachs Engel. Stimmen zum Kölner Schwebenden. Herausgegeben von Antje Löhr-Sieberg und Annette Scholl unter Mitarbeit von Anselm Weyer. Greven Verlag, Köln 2011, S. 54–57. ISBN 978-3-7743-0481-9.

== Literature ==
- Michael F. Feldkamp (ed.), Der Bundestagspräsident. Amt – Funktion – Person. 16. Wahlperiode, München 2007, ISBN 978-3-7892-8201-0

Political offices
Preceded by Rita Süssmuth	President of the Bundestag; 1998–2005	Succeeded by Norbert Lammert
