= Emmy Diemer-Nicolaus =

German politician

Member of the Bundestag
- In office 15 October 1957 – 22 September 1972

Personal details
- Born: 31 January 1910 Gießen, Grand Duchy of Hesse, German Empire
- Died: 1 January 2008 (aged 97) Stuttgart, Baden-Württemberg, Germany
- Party: FDP

Emmy DiemerNicolaus (31 January 1910 – 1 January 2008) was a German politician of the Free Democratic Party (FDP) and former member of the German Bundestag.

== Life ==
Emmy Diemer-Nicolaus was a municipal councillor in Stuttgart from 1946 to 1950. Afterwards, she was a member of the state parliament of Württemberg-Baden from 1950 to 1952. After the merger of Württemberg-Baden, Württemberg-Hohenzollern and Baden from 1952 to 1957 she was a member of the state parliament of Baden-Württemberg. Here she was particularly committed to a liberal constitution for Baden-Württemberg.

In 1957, Diemer-Nicolaus was elected to the German Bundestag via the state list of the FDP in Baden-Württemberg.

== Literature ==
Herbst, Ludolf; Jahn, Bruno (2002). Vierhaus, Rudolf (ed.). Biographisches Handbuch der Mitglieder des Deutschen Bundestages. 1949–2002 [Biographical Handbook of the Members of the German Bundestag. 1949–2002] (in German). München: De Gruyter - De Gruyter Saur. p. 1715. ISBN 978-3-11-184511-1.
