= European Civil Liberties Network =

European Civil Liberties Network is a Europe-wide civil liberties advocacy group.

== See also ==
- American Civil Liberties Union
- Statewatch
