= Düsseldorf University of Applied Sciences =

Public research university in North Rhine-Westphalia, Germany

- Hochschule Düsseldorf
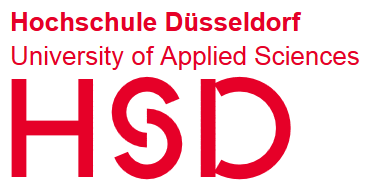
- Motto: Kosmos der Ideen
- Motto in English: Cosmos of Ideas
- Type: Public
- Established: 1971; 55 years ago
- Founders: Landtag of North Rhine-Westphalia
- President: Edeltraud Vomberg
- Academic staff: 860 professors 199
- Students: 11,012 WS 2022/23
- Address: Münsterstraße 156, Düsseldorf, North Rhine-Westphalia, 40476, Germany; 51.248°N 6.791°E
- Campus: Urban
- Colors: Red
- Website: www.hs-duesseldorf.de

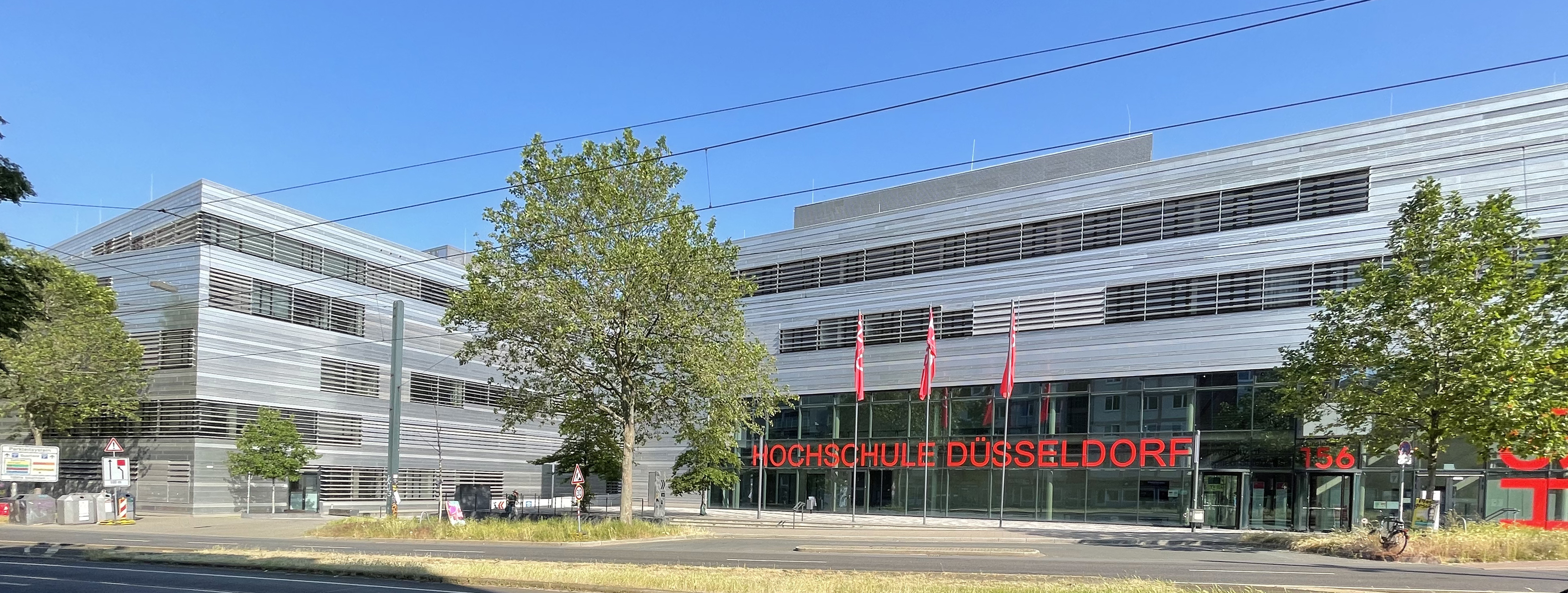
Hochschule Düsseldorf

The Düsseldorf University of Applied Sciences is a Fachhochschule (University of Applied Sciences) with departments for social sciences and cultural studies, technical sciences, architecture, media, design and business education in Düsseldorf with more than 9,000 students. Its foundation was in 1971. It is the second largest University of Applied Sciences in North Rhine-Westphalia, after the Technical University of Cologne.

On 1 May 2015 the name was changed from Fachhochschule Düsseldorf to Hochschule Düsseldorf.

== History ==
Hochschule Düsseldorf, University of Applied Sciences (HSD), was established on August 1, 1971, through the merger of several regional educational institutions. This consolidation aimed to create a comprehensive institution offering a wide range of applied sciences programs. Over the years, HSD has expanded its academic offerings and facilities, becoming one of the largest universities of applied sciences in North Rhine-Westphalia. In 2015, the institution underwent a rebranding, changing its name from Fachhochschule Düsseldorf to Hochschule Düsseldorf to reflect its broad spectrum of disciplines and its commitment to practical, application-oriented education.

== List of Departments ==
- Architecture
- Design
- Electrical Engineering
- Mechanical and Process Engineering
- Media
- Social Sciences and Cultural Studies
- Business Studies
- Education

== Study Programs ==
The university provides bachelor's and master's degrees.

Faculty of Architecture:

- Bachelor's Programmes:
  - Architecture
- Master's Programmes:
  - Architecture

Faculty of Design:

- Bachelor's Programmes:
  - Communication Design
  - Retail Design
- Master's Programmes:
  - Exhibition Design

Faculty of Electrical Engineering and Information Technology:

- Bachelor's Programmes:
  - Electrical Engineering
  - Information Technology
- Master's Programmes:
  - Automation and Control
  - Communication Engineering

Faculty of Mechanical and Process Engineering:

- Bachelor's Programmes:
  - Mechanical Engineering
  - Process Engineering
- Master's Programmes:
  - Mechanical Engineering
  - Process Engineering

Faculty of Media:

- Bachelor's Programmes:
  - Audio and Video
  - Media Engineering
  - Media Informatics
- Master's Programmes:
  - Media Informatics

Faculty of Social Sciences and Cultural Studies:

- Bachelor's Programmes:
  - Early Childhood Education and Family Studies
  - Social Work / Social Pedagogy (Full-Time/Part-Time)
- Master's Programmes:
  - Culture, Aesthetics, Media (Full-Time/Part-Time)
  - Empowerment Studies (Full-Time/Part-Time)
  - Social Work and Pedagogy with a Focus on Psychosocial Counselling

Faculty of Business Studies:

- Bachelor's Programmes:
  - Business Administration (Full-Time/Part-Time)
  - Communication and Multimedia Management
  - International Management
  - Taxation 3in1
- Master's Programmes:
  - Business Analytics
  - Communication, Multimedia and Market Management

Centre for Digitalisation and Digitality (ZDD):

- Bachelor's Programmes:
  - Data Science, AI and Intelligent Systems (DAISY)
- Master's Programmes:
  - Transforming Digitality
