= Dieter-Julius Cronenberg =

German politician

Dieter Julius Cronenberg

Member of the Bundestag
- In office 14 December 1976 – 10 November 1994

Personal details
- Born: 8 February 1930 Neheim, Germany
- Died: 21 November 2013 (aged 83)
- Party: FDP

Dieter Julius Cronenberg (8 February 1930 – 21 November 2013) was a German politician of the Free Democratic Party (FDP) and former member of the German Bundestag.

== Biography ==
From 1976 to 1994, Cronenberg was a member of the German Bundestag. From 1979 to 1985 he was deputy chairman of the FDP parliamentary group in the Bundestag. In December 1984, he was elected vice president of the German Bundestag to succeed Richard Wurbs and remained so for over ten years until he left the Bundestag in 1994.

== Literature ==
Herbst, Ludolf; Jahn, Bruno (2002). Vierhaus, Rudolf (ed.). Biographisches Handbuch der Mitglieder des Deutschen Bundestages. 1949–2002 [Biographical Handbook of the Members of the German Bundestag. 1949–2002] (in German). München: De Gruyter - De Gruyter Saur. p. 1715. ISBN 978-3-11-184511-1.
