= Humanist Union =

German civil rights organization

The Humanist Union (German: Humanistische Union, HU) is a German civil rights organization. Their targets include the enforcement of freedom of information, direct democracy and the abolition of the Federal Office for the Protection of the Constitution. Part of its program are the separation of church and state; it takes a critical stance on constitutional privileges granted to philosophical and religious organizations and against religious education. The Humanist Union was founded in 1961 in Munich and is the oldest existing civil rights organization in the Federal Republic of Germany. It has about 1,200 members. The Humanist Union is a member of the European Civil Liberties Network. It has awarded the Fritz Bauer Prize since 1968.
