= List of presidents of the Bundestag =

The President of the Bundestag (Präsident des Deutschen Bundestages) presides over the sessions of the German parliament, the Bundestag. Since the introduction of the office in 1949, thirteen people held the office. President of the current 21st Bundestag is, since 25 March 2025, Julia Klöckner (CDU).

== List of ==
Political parties CDU SPD

Portrait	Name (Born–Died)	Term of office			Political party
Portrait	Name (Born–Died)	Took office	Left office	Days	Political party
1	Erich Köhler (1892–1958)	7 September 1949	18 October 1950	406	Christian Democratic Union
2	Hermann Ehlers (1904–1954)	19 October 1950	29 October 1954	1471	Christian Democratic Union
3	Eugen Gerstenmaier (1906–1986)	16 November 1954	31 January 1969	5190	Christian Democratic Union
4	Kai-Uwe von Hassel (1913–1997)	5 February 1969	13 December 1972	1407	Christian Democratic Union
5	Annemarie Renger (1919–2008)	13 December 1972	14 December 1976	1462	Social Democratic Party
6	Karl Carstens (1914–1992)	14 December 1976	31 May 1979	898	Christian Democratic Union
7	Richard Stücklen (1916–2002)	31 May 1979	29 March 1983	1398	Christian Democratic Union
8	Rainer Barzel (1924–2006)	29 March 1983	25 October 1984	576	Christian Democratic Union
9	Philipp Jenninger (1932–2018)	5 November 1984	11 November 1988	1467	Christian Democratic Union
10	Rita Süssmuth (1937–2026)	25 November 1988	26 October 1998	3622	Christian Democratic Union
11	Wolfgang Thierse (born 1943)	26 October 1998	18 October 2005	2549	Social Democratic Party
12	Norbert Lammert (born 1948)	18 October 2005	24 October 2017	4389	Christian Democratic Union
13	Wolfgang Schäuble (1942–2023)	24 October 2017	26 October 2021	1463	Christian Democratic Union
14	Bärbel Bas (born 1968)	26 October 2021	25 March 2025	1246	Social Democratic Party
15	Julia Klöckner (born 1972)	25 March 2025	Incumbent	313	Christian Democratic Union
