= Second Bundestag =

2nd Bundestag
←	1st	3rd	→

Overview
- Legislative body: Bundestag
- Jurisdiction: Germany
- Meeting place: Bundeshaus, Bonn
- Term: 6 October 1953 – 6 October 1957
- Election: 6 September 1953
- Government: Second Adenauer cabinet
- Members: 509
- President: Hermann Ehlers (CDU/CSU; Eugen Gerstenmaier (CDU/CSU)

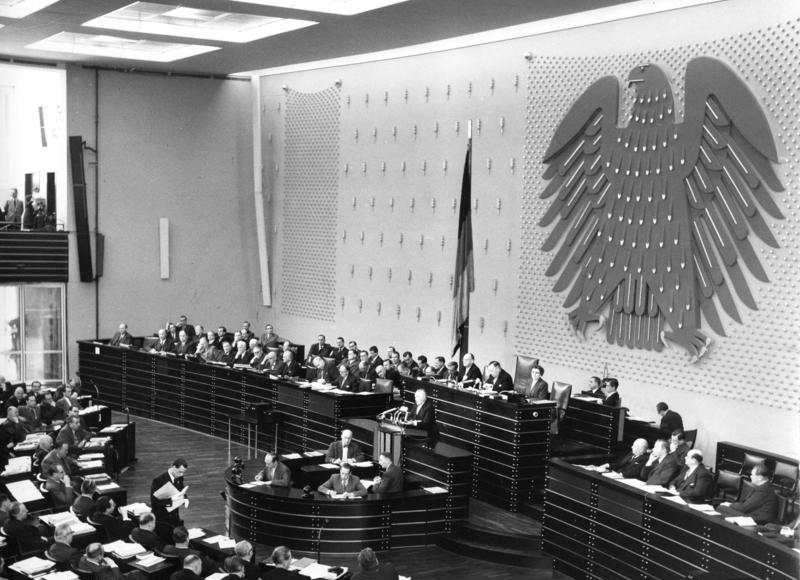
Second reading of the Paris Agreements in the German Bundestag in Bonn on 25 February 1955.

The Bundestag is the German federal parliament, and the only federal representative body that is directly elected by the German people. It was established in 1949 by the Basic Law for the Federal Republic of Germany and is the historical successor to the Reichstag. The Second German Bundestag came into being in 1953 and ended in 1957.

== Dates of Session ==
1953-1957

- The 2nd Bundestag convened in Bonn on 6 October 1953.
- The session ended on 6 October 1957.

== Coalitions ==
- CDU/CSU and FDP form coalition (311 seats, 63.9%) to reelect Konrad Adenauer as Chancellor of Germany

== Major political events ==
- Bundestag reelects Hermann Ehlers as the second President of the Bundestag, 6 October 1953
- Bundestag reelects Konrad Adenauer Chancellor of Germany, 6 October 1953.
- Upon Ehlers' death, Bundestag elects Eugen Gerstenmaier third President of the Bundestag, 16 November 1954
- Bundestag passes first reform of state-funded pension system
- Bundestag ratifies Treaty of Rome
- In 1955, constitution is amended to allow for defensive military and conscription over the strong opposition of the SPD minority
- Germany joins the NATO

== Officers ==
- President of the Bundestag - Hermann Ehlers, Eugen Gerstenmaier

== Seats by Party ==
+	+	+	+	+	+	+	+	+	+	+	+	+	+	+	+	+	+	+	+	+	+	+	+	+	+	+	+	+	+	+	+	+	+	+	+	+	+	+	+	+	+	+	+	+	+	+	+
+	+	+	+	+	+	+	+	+	+	+	+	+	+	+	+	+	+	+	+	+	+	+	+	+	+	+	+	+	+	+	+	+	+	+	+	+	+	+	+	+	+	+	+	+	+	+	+
+	+	+	+	+	+	+	+	+	+	+	+	+	+	+	+	+	+	+	+	+	+	+	+	+	+	+	+	+	+	+	+	+	+	+	+	+	+	+	+	+	+	+	+	+	+	+	+
+	+	+	+	+	+	+	+	+	+	+	+	+	+	+	+	+	+	+	+	+	+	+	+	+	+	+	+	+	+	+	+	+	+	+	+	+	+	+	+	+	+	+	+	+	+	+	+
+	+	+	+	+	+	+	+	+	+	+	+	+	+	+	+	+	+	+	+	+	+	+	+	+	+	+	+	+	+	+	+	+	+	+	+	+	+	+	+	+	+	+	+	+	+	+	+
+	+	+																																													
+	+	+	+	+	+	+	+	+	+	+	+	+	+	+	+	+	+	+	+	+	+	+	+	+	+	+	+	+	+	+	+	+	+	+	+	+	+	+	+	+	+	+	+	+	+	+	+
+	+	+	+	+	+	+	+	+	+	+	+	+	+	+	+	+	+	+	+	+	+	+	+	+	+	+	+	+	+	+	+	+	+	+	+	+	+	+	+	+	+	+	+	+	+	+	+
+	+	+	+	+	+	+	+	+	+	+	+	+	+	+	+	+	+	+	+	+	+	+	+	+	+	+	+	+	+	+	+	+	+	+	+	+	+	+	+	+	+	+	+	+	+	+	+
+	+	+	+	+	+	+																																									
+	+	+	+	+	+	+	+	+	+	+	+	+	+	+	+	+	+	+	+	+	+	+	+	+	+	+	+	+	+	+	+	+	+	+	+	+	+	+	+	+	+	+	+	+	+	+	+
+	+	+	+	+	+	+	+	+	+	+	+	+	+	+	+	+	+	+	+	+	+	+	+	+	+	+																					
+	+	+	+	+	+	+	+	+	+	+	+	+	+	+																																	
+	+	+																																													

+	CDU/CSU: 243 (45.2%)
+	SPD: 151 (28.8%)
+	FDP: 48 (9.5%)
+	GB/BHE: 27 (5.9%)
+	DP: 15 (3.3%)
+	Zentrum: 3 (0.8%)
	Total: 487 Seats

Preceded by 1st Bundestag	German Bundestag; 1949–1953	Succeeded by 3rd Bundestag
