= First Bundestag =

1st Bundestag
| 2nd | → |

Overview
- Legislative body: Bundestag
- Jurisdiction: Germany
- Meeting place: Bundeshaus, Bonn
- Term: 7 September 1949 – 7 September 1953
- Election: 14 August 1949
- Government: First Adenauer cabinet
- Members: 402
- President: Erich Köhler (CDU/CSU); Hermann Ehlers (CDU/CSU)

The First German Bundestag was the first German parliament after the Second World War. It existed between September 7, 1949 and September 7, 1953. The senior president was Paul Löbe from the SPD. On September 15, 1949, the first Bundestag elected Konrad Adenauer ( CDU ) Chancellor with 202 yes votes, 142 no votes, 44 abstentions and one invalid vote in the first ballot. The first bundestag held a total of 282 sessions, with the last session taking place on July 29, 1953. It was succeeded by the Second German Bundestag.

== Dates of Session ==
1949-1953

- Election for the first Bundestag occurred on 14 August 1949.
- The Bundestag convened for the first time in Bonn on 7 September 1949.
- The session ended on September 7, 1953.

== Coalitions ==
- CDU/CSU, FDP and DP form coalition (208 seats, 51.7%) to elect Konrad Adenauer as the first Chancellor of Germany

== Major political events ==
- Bundestag meets with quorum of members to elect Erich Köhler first President of the Bundestag, 7 September 1949.
- Federal Convention elects Theodor Heuss first President of Germany. The President takes the oath of office before a joint session of the Bundestag and the Bundesrat on the same date, Friday, 12 September 1949.
- Bundestag elects Konrad Adenauer first Chancellor of Germany, Monday 15 September 1949.
- Köhler loses support within his own party, Hermann Ehlers elected second President of the Bundestag.
- Kurt Schumacher is temporarily removed from the Bundestag after calling Adenauer "the Allied Forces' Chancellor"
- Bundestag passes laws concerning restitution and recovery of damages due to World War II (Lastenausgleichsgesetz), corporate governance, and antitrust regulation
- Bundestag ratifies treaty for the European Coal and Steel Community

== Officers ==
- President of the Bundestag - Erich Köhler, Hermann Ehlers

== Seats by party ==
| + | + | + | + | + | + | + | + | + | + | + | + | + | + | + | + | + | + | + | + | + | + | + | + | + | + | + | + | + | + | + | + | + | + | + | + | + | + | + | + | + | + | + | + | + | + | + | + |
| + | + | + | + | + | + | + | + | + | + | + | + | + | + | + | + | + | + | + | + | + | + | + | + | + | + | + | + | + | + | + | + | + | + | + | + | + | + | + | + | + | + | + | + | + | + | + | + |
| + | + | + | + | + | + | + | + | + | + | + | + | + | + | + | + | + | + | + | + | + | + | + | + | + | + | + | + | + | + | + | + | + | + | + | + | + | + | + | + | + | + | + | + | + | + | + | + |
| + | + | + | + | + | + | + | + | + | + | + | + | + | + | + | + | + | + | + | + | + | + | + | + | + | + | + | + | + | + | + | + | + | + | + | + | + | + | + | + | + | + | + |
| + | + | + | + | + | + | + | + | + | + | + | + | + | + | + | + | + | + | + | + | + | + | + | + | + | + | + | + | + | + | + | + | + | + | + | + | + | + | + | + | + | + | + | + | + | + | + | + |
| + | + | + | + | + | + | + | + | + | + | + | + | + | + | + | + | + | + | + | + | + | + | + | + | + | + | + | + | + | + | + | + | + | + | + | + | + | + | + | + | + | + | + | + | + | + | + | + |
| + | + | + | + | + | + | + | + | + | + | + | + | + | + | + | + | + | + | + | + | + | + | + | + | + | + | + | + | + | + | + | + | + | + | + | + | + | + | + | + | + |
| + | + | + | + | + | + | + | + | + | + | + | + | + | + | + | + | + | + | + | + | + | + | + | + | + | + | + | + | + | + | + | + | + | + | + | + | + | + | + | + | + | + | + | + | + | + | + | + |
| + | + | + | + |
| + | + | + | + | + | + | + | + | + | + | + | + | + | + | + |
| + | + | + | + | + | + | + | + | + | + | + | + | + | + | + | + | + |
| + | + | + | + | + | + | + | + | + | + | + | + | + | + | + | + | + |
| + | + | + | + | + | + | + | + | + | + |
| + | + | + | + | + | + | + | + | + | + | + | + |
| + | + | + | + | + |
| + | + | + | + |

| + | CDU/CSU: 139 (31.0%) |
| + | SPD: 131 (29.2%) |
| + | FDP: 52 (11.9%) |
| + | KPD: 15 (5.7%) |
| + | BP: 17 (4.2%) |
| + | DP: 17 (4.0%) |
| + | Zentrum: 10 (3.1%) |
| + | WAV: 12 (2.9%) |
| + | DRP: 5 (1.8%) |
| + | Others: 4 (6.2%) |
| | Total: 402 Seats |

| Preceded by — | German Bundestag; 1949–1953 | Succeeded by 2nd Bundestag |
