= Langer Eugen =

High-rise building in Germany

Coordinates: 50°43′06″N 7°07′39″E

Langer Eugen ("Tall Eugene")
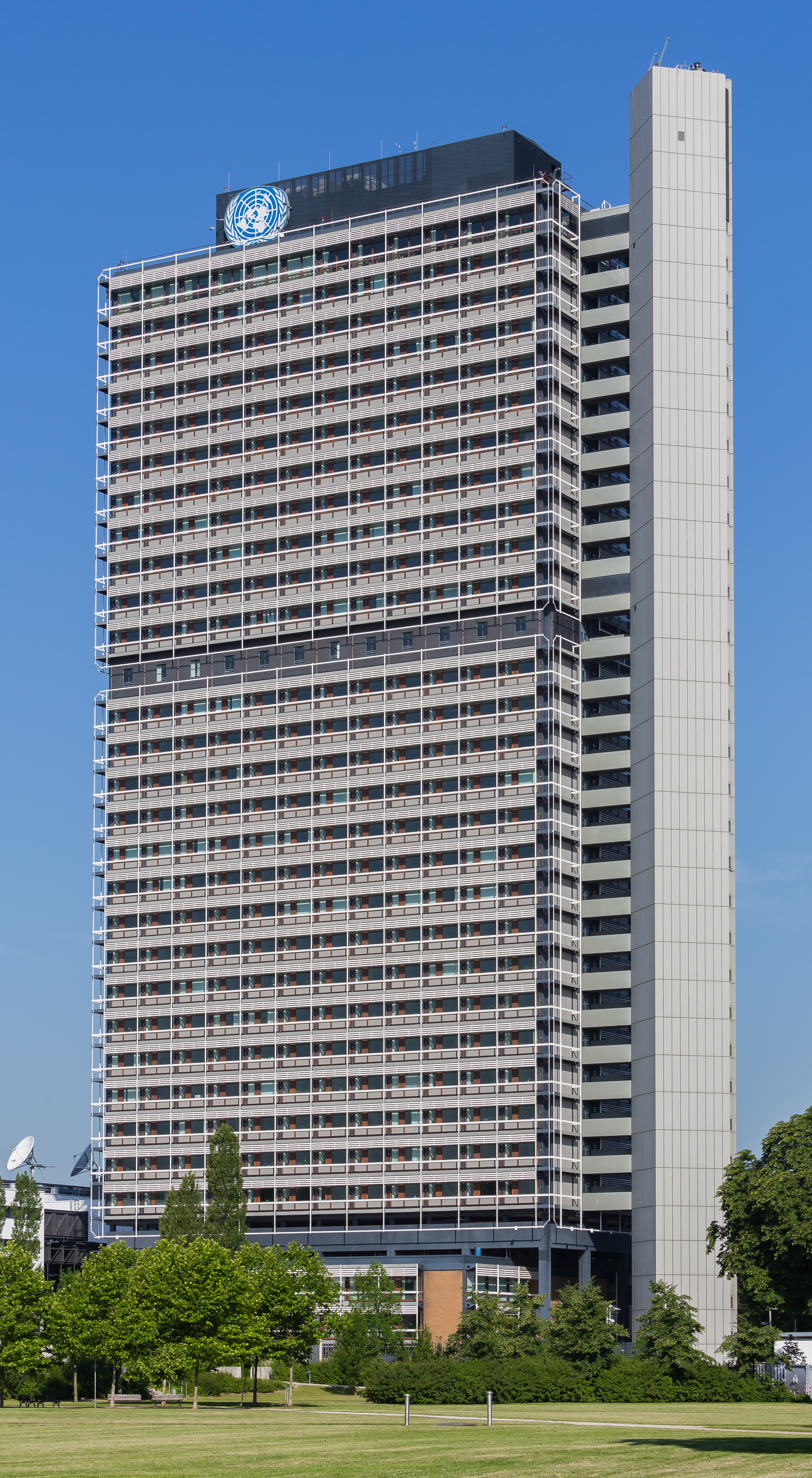
- Interactive map of the Langer Eugen ("Tall Eugene") area
- Former names: Neues Abgeordnetenhochhaus (New Representatives Tower)
- Alternative names: UN-Hochhaus (UN Tower)

General information
- Location: Bonn, Germany
- Current tenants: United Nations
- Named for: Eugen Gerstenmaier
- Construction started: 29 August 1966
- Topped-out: 10 May 1968
- Completed: 19 February 1969
- Owner: Institute for Federal Real Estate (Germany)

Height
- Height: 115 metres (377 ft)

Technical details
- Floor count: 30
- Lifts/elevators: 13

Design and construction
- Architect: Egon Eiermann

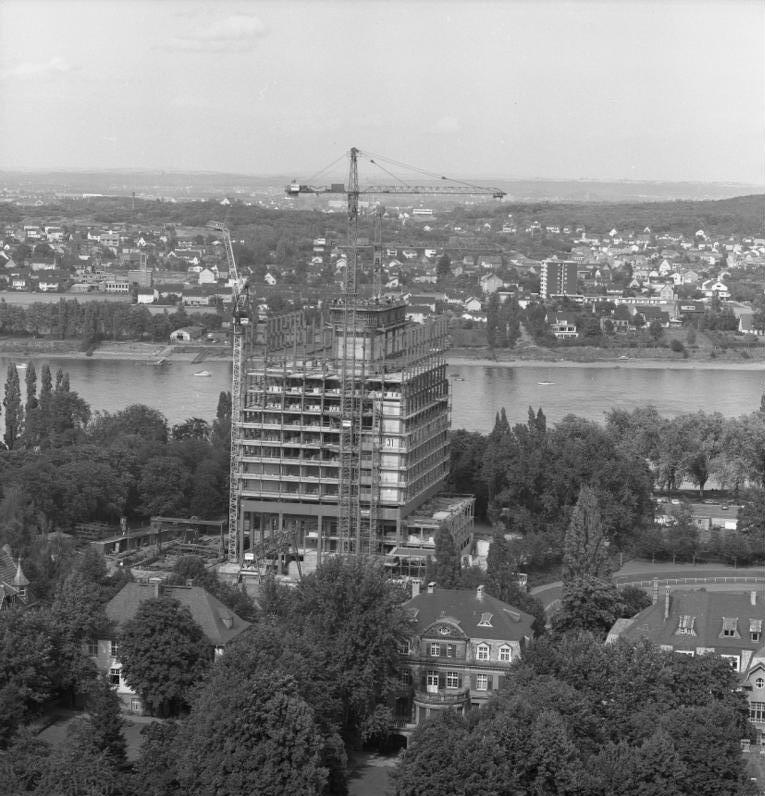
Langer Eugen under construction, looking east across the Rhine

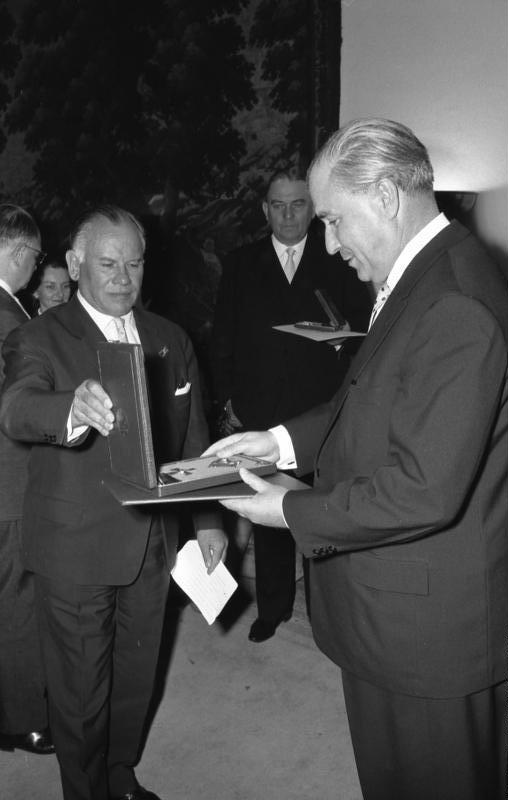
Eugen Gerstenmaier (left)

Langer Eugen (English: "Tall Eugene") is an office tower in the Gronau district of Bonn, Germany. It was built between 1966 and 1969. Since 2006 it has housed several United Nations organizations. Until the German Bundestag (parliament) moved to Berlin in 1999, the building was the primary location for the offices of the members of the Bundestag. After renovations, eleven UN organizations moved into the building and it began serving as the center of the UN Campus, Bonn. Langer Eugen is protected as a landmark or listed building under the North Rhine-Westphalia Monument Protection Law. It is currently the second-tallest building in Bonn and the 43rd tallest building in Germany (excluding non-habitable structures such as radio and observation towers, steeples, and chimneys). When it was built it was briefly the second-tallest building in Germany, behind the Bayer-Hochhaus.

== History ==
=== Old Representatives House ===
The Bundestag, which met in the Bundeshaus in Bonn beginning in 1949, had built a 160-office building connected to the Bundeshaus in 1951 to house the representatives' offices, the "Abgeordnetenhochhaus" (Representatives Tower). As the Bundestag at that time had nearly 500 representatives so additional office space was rented for the other representatives. Construction of a new office building was prevented by a building freeze which took effect in 1956. The freeze was enacted due to Bonn's officially 'provisional' status as capital of West Germany. It was felt that excessive construction would make its status seem more permanent and undermine the eventual reunification. The halt was eventually loosened as the lack of space grew ever more urgent in the early 1960s. At that time, planning for the new Representatives House began.

=== Construction and renovations ===
The area between the Bundeshaus and the Bonn Sports Complex, which was in the process of relocating, seemed ideal. In March 1965, Egon Eiermann, one of the most prominent German architects of the period, received the contract for the design and the artistic management. The cornerstone was laid on 19 August 1966; it topped out on 10 May 1968, was dedicated on 19 February 1969 and the representatives moved in on 1 November 1969. The construction cost 50 million Deutsche Marks. With the completion of the building, each representative in the Bundestag had his own office of 17 square meters with additional open plan offices for secretaries.

In 1975, glass doors were installed on all office floors for fire protection and an emergency landing platform was installed on the roof. In 1979, an emergency exit stair tower was added on the Rhine side of the building after plans of Eiermann's student, Georg Pollich.

=== Name ===
The building's name, "Langer Eugen" ("Tall Eugene") is an ironic reference to the short stature of Eugen Gerstenmaier (the implied "Short Eugene"), who was President of the Bundestag when the tower was built, and was the driving force behind its construction.

=== Post-Bundestag era — UN Campus ===
After the Bundestag moved back to the Reichstag building in Berlin in the summer of 1999, Langer Eugen was next used by the Federal Institute for Vocational Education (Bundesinstitut für Berufsbildung) and various other national and international educational institutions. On 28 May 2003 the federal government decided to turn the building over the United Nations for permanent use. The required renovations were handled by the North Rhine-Westphalia state construction company and cost an estimated €54 million. The renovations made few substantial alterations in order to preserve Eiermann's architecture as much as possible. On 31 March 2006, ownership of the property was transferred to the Federal Ministry for the Environment, Nature Conservation, Building and Nuclear Safety.

With the exception of the largest office, the United Nations Framework Convention on Climate Change secretariat, all the Bonn-based UN offices were moved into the building in April 2006 (though part of the growing Climate Secretariat moved into the building in July 2010). At the beginning of May, three large, lighted UN-emblems were added to the roof, though for technical reasons, one could not be placed on the Rhine-facing side. Also as part of the security preparations for UN occupancy, a 700-meter fence was built encircling the UN campus and an adjacent road was closed to traffic. On 11 July 2006, then Secretary-General dedicated the UN Campus. After the renovations, there is room for approximately 675 employees in the building, though some floors remain empty for future UN institutions to occupy. With the occupancy of the UN, the area became an extraterritorial jurisdiction, similar to an embassy or consulate.

== Architecture and design ==
According to the specifications, the building is 115 meters high, distributed over 30 stories, with an additional three basement levels. At the time of its use by the Bundestag, floors 3-17 each accommodated 30 offices for the 446 representatives. Floors 19-28 housed the various committee offices as well as conference rooms. Technical facilities were located on floors 18 and 30. The 29th and top usable floor, housed a restaurant. Since the renovations, the building now contains 410 offices, 40 conference rooms, and a library.

The frame of the building is made entirely of steel. This is highly unusual in central European construction where most buildings use concrete frames. Therefore, even though it is only the 43rd tallest building in Germany, it is actually the tallest building in Germany with a steel frame.

The building is protected as a landmark by the North Rhine-Westphalian government. The building received this status very early, less than 30 years after its construction. Preservationists justified their decision, stating that the building, with its eschewal of hierarchical elements in the facade design, was a "vivid example for the understanding of democratic construction in the young West Germany."

== See also ==
- List of tallest buildings in Germany
- UN Campus, Bonn
