= Egon Eiermann =

German architect

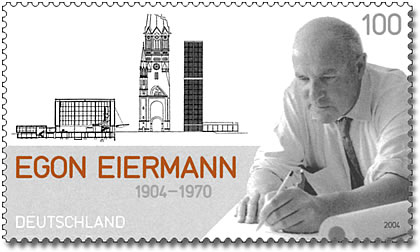
- Egon Eiermann on a German stamp
- Born: September 29, 1904; Neuendorf bei Potsdam, Prussia, German Empire
- Died: July 19, 1970 (aged 65); Baden Baden, West Germany
- Education: Technische Universität Berlin
- Occupations: Architect, furniture designer
- Notable work: Embassy of Germany, Washington, D.C.; New church at Kaiser Wilhelm Memorial Church; Langer Eugen, Bonn

Egon Eiermann (29 September 1904 – 19 July 1970) was one of Germany's most prominent architects in the second half of the 20th century. He was also a furniture designer. From 1947, he was Professor for architecture at Technische Hochschule Karlsruhe (today Karlsruhe Institute of Technology).

== Biography ==
Eiermann was born in Neuendorf bei Potsdam (now part of Babelsberg, Potsdam), the son of Wilhelm Eiermann (1874–1948), a locomotive engineer and his wife Emma Gellhorn (1875–1959). He archived his Abitur at the Althoff-Gymnasium and studied architecture at Technische Universität Berlin. From 1925 to 1928, he was master student of Hans Poelzig. After graduating in 1928, he gained professional experience in the construction departments of Karstadt AG in Hamburg and the Berlin electricity works (Bewag (Berlin)). From 1931 to 1945, he was an independent architect in Berlin and initially planned residential buildings. Before World War II he had an office with fellow architect Fritz Jaenecke. During the Nazi era, he mainly created industrial architecture. In 1945, he escaped to Buchen in West Germany, the birthplace of his father. From 1946 to 1965, he had a shared office with Robert Hilgers. In 1948, the office was relocated to Karlsruhe. He joined the faculty of the Technische Hochschule Karlsruhe in 1947, working there on developing steel frame construction methods. Students were Oswald Mathias Ungers and Julia Bolles-Wilson. During a study trip to the United States in 1950, he met Walter Gropius, Marcel Breuer and Konrad Wachsmann in Boston and in 1956 also Ludwig Mies van der Rohe. In 1967, Eiermann chaired the jury in the architectural competition for the Olympic Park in Munich. (Note: Behnisch and Partners & Frei Otto won the competition with a characteristic tent roof.)

== Personal life ==
In 1940, he married in Berlin interior designer Charlotte, née Friedheim (1912–2001) and in 1954 in Berlin architect Brigitte, née Feyerabendt (1924–2019). He had two children: with his first wife Andreas (born 1942), from his second marriage Anna (born 1956).

He died in Baden-Baden, aged 65. He is buried at the Buchen Cemetery.

== Works ==
During the years of reconstruction, his steel-frame industrial buildings became exemplary. The buildings were transparent, inviting, democratic, making order visible.

A functionalist, his major works include: the textile mill at Blumberg (1951); the West German pavilion at the Brussels World's Fair (with Sep Ruf, 1958); (Note: A pavilion group consisting of eight elegant, transparent glass cubes was created.) the Embassy of Germany, Washington, D.C. (1958–1964); the highrise Langer Eugen for the German Parliament in Bonn (1965–1969); the IBM-Germany Headquarters in Stuttgart (1967–1972); and, the Olivetti building in Frankfurt (1968–1972). By far his most famous work is the new church on the site of the Kaiser Wilhelm Memorial Church in Berlin (1959–1963).

The sets of the 1926 film The Pink Diamond were designed by Eiermann.

- 1929–1930 Substation of the Berliner Elektrizitätswerke AG, Berlin-Steglitz
- 1931–1933 Hesse residential building, Berlin-Lankwitz
- 1936–1937 Steingroever residential building, Berlin-Grunewald
- 1938 factory building and boiler house of the Degea-AG-Auergesellschaft, Berlin-Wedding
- 1938–1939 expansion and conversion of the Total-Werke Foerstner & Co, Apolda
- 1939–1941 factory buildings of Märkische Metallbau GmbH, Oranienburg
- 1948–1950 administration and factory building of Ciba AG, Wehr/Baden
- 1949–1950 handkerchief weaving mill/spinning mill, Blumberg/Black Forest
- 1950–1953 administration building of the United Silk Weaving Works, Krefeld
- 1951–1956 experimental power plant of TU Karlsruhe
- 1953 St. Matthew Church, Pforzheim
- 1953–1954 Burda Moden publishing house, Offenburg
- 1954–1961 residential building, Interbau, Hansaviertel, Berlin-Tiergarten
- 1955–1957 Volkshilfe administration building, Cologne
- 1956–1958 German Pavilion, World Exhibition in Brussels (with Sep Ruf, exterior planning by Walter Rossow)
- 1956–1960 administration building of Steinkohlebergwerke AG, Essen
- 1957–1963 Kaiser Wilhelm Memorial Church, Berlin-Charlottenburg
- 1958–1961 Head office of Neckermann Versand KG, Frankfurt am Main
- 1958–1961 administration building of the steel structure Gustav Müller, Offenburg
- 1958–1964 Chancellery building of the German Embassy, Washington
- 1959–1962 Eiermann house, Baden-Baden
- 1961–1967 buildings for the DEA-Scholven GmbH refinery, Karlsruhe
- 1965–1969 high-rise building for members of the German Bundestag, Bonn
- 1967–1972 Administration and training center of Deutsche Olivetti, Frankfurt am Main,
- 1967–1972 IBM headquarters, Stuttgart-Vaihingen (Eiermann-Campus)

=== Gallery ===
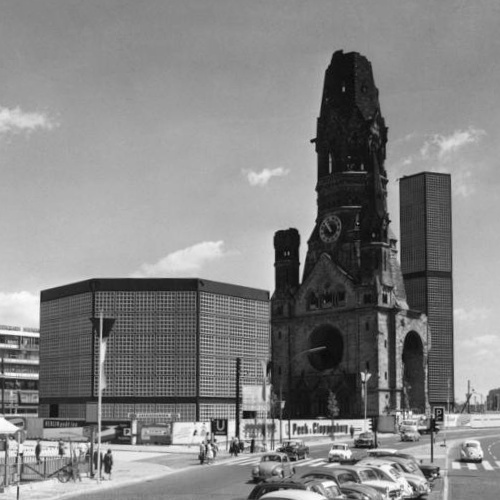
Kaiser-Wilhelm-Gedächtniskirche

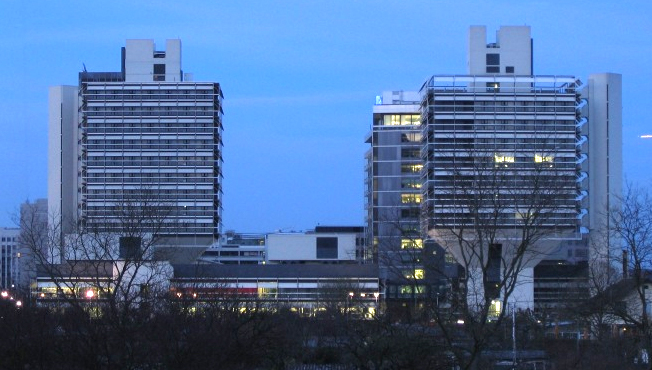
Olivetti Buildings in Frankfurt

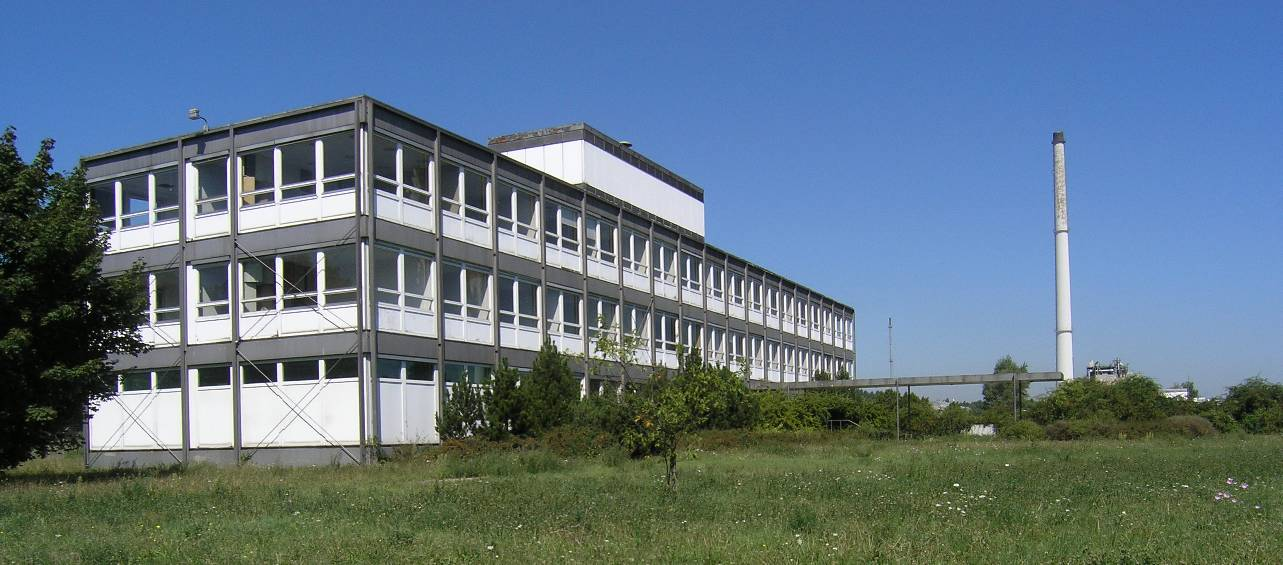
Office building of DEA oil refinery, Karlsruhe

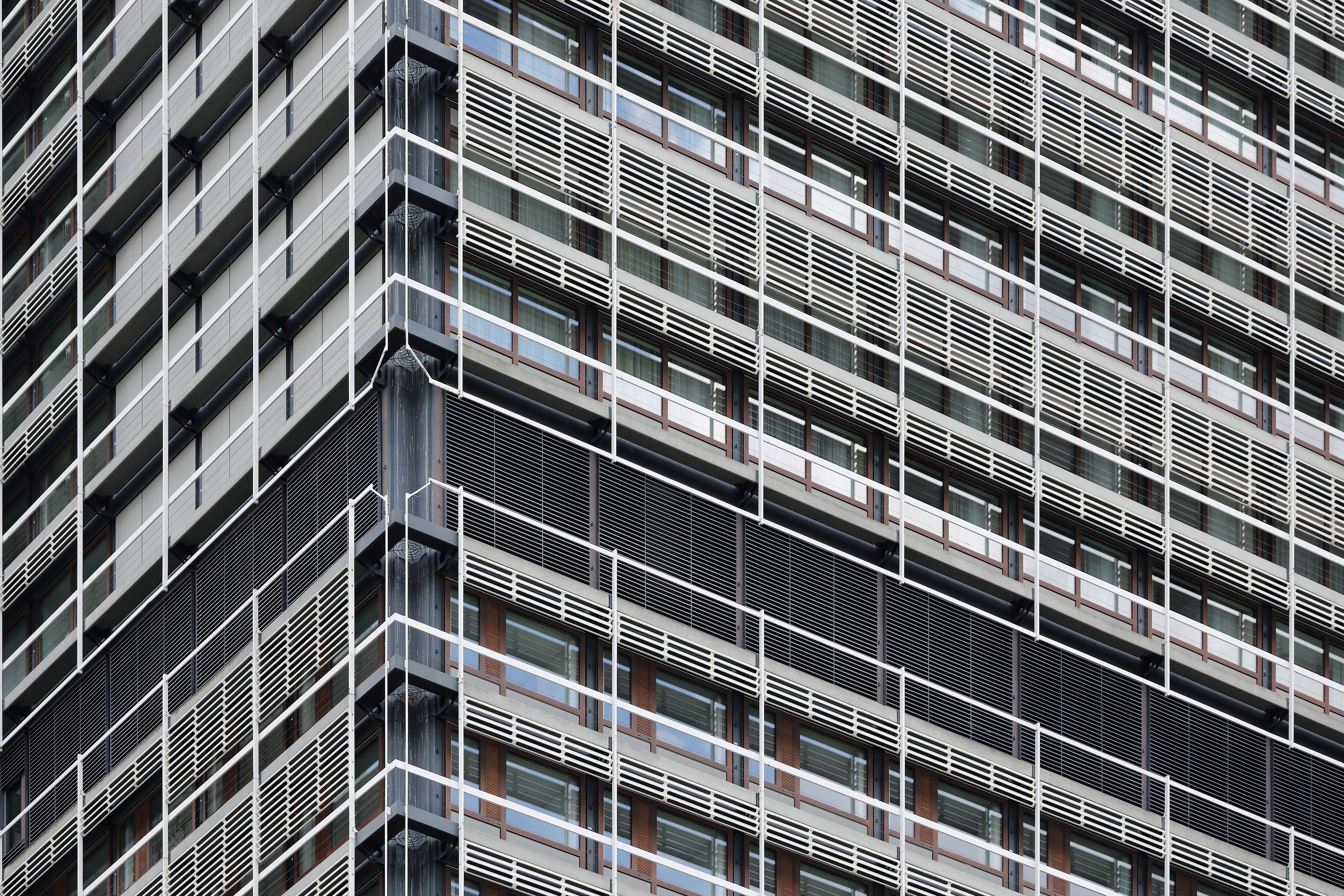
Langer Eugen, Bonn – detail of the facade

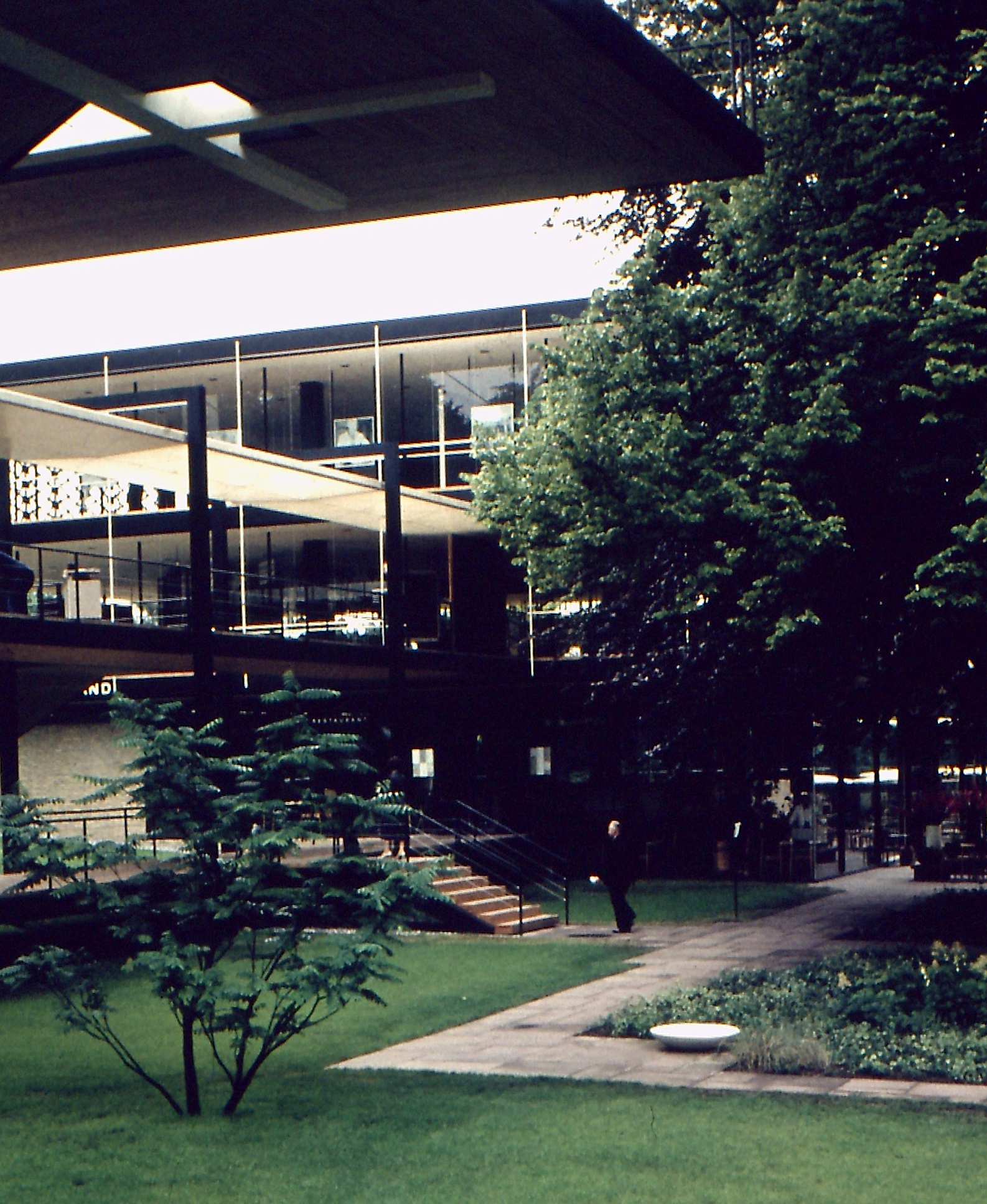
Expo Brüssel 1958 German pavilion

=== Design ===
From 1949, the first functional and serially produced seating furniture made of wood and tubular steel was created in cooperation with the Esslingen company Wilde + Spieth.

- 1950 SE 68 tubular steel chair
- 1952 E 10 wicker chair
- 1952–1953 SE 18 wooden folding chair
- 1953 table frame Eiermann 1
- 1960–1961 Church seat SE 121
- 1965 table frame Eiermann 2

== Awards ==
- 1962 Berlin Art Prize
- 1965 honorary doctorate from Technische Universität Berlin
- 1965 Grand State Prize for Architecture of the State of North Rhine-Westphalia
- 1968 Grand Prize of the Association of German Architects (Großer BDA Preis)
- 1968 Grand Federal Cross of Merit
- 1969 Hugo Häring Prize of the BDA Baden-Württemberg
- 1970 Order Pour le Mérite for Science and Arts

In 1997, the Egon Eiermann Society was founded in Karlsruhe. In 2004, the Bundespost honored Eiermann with a special postage stamp. In Karlsruhe, Egon-Eiermann-Allee (49°02′12″N 8°20′56″E) was named after him in 2009. One of the lecture halls in the architectural building (49°00′40″N 8°24′40″E) of the Karlsruhe Institute of Technology bears his name. The Egon Eiermann Award is an international ideas competition in architecture.

=== Memberships ===
- 1926 Founding member of the "Group of Young Architects" ("Gruppe junger Architekten")
- 1931 Member of the Association of German Architects (Bund Deutscher Architekten)
- 1931 Member of Deutscher Werkbund
- 1951 Founding member of the German Design Council (Rat für Formgebung)
- 1955 Member of the Academy of Arts, Berlin (West), Section Architecture
- 1960 Honorary member of the Central Association of Austrian Architects
- 1962 Member of the planning council for the new buildings of the German Bundestag and the German Bundesrat in Bonn
- 1963 Corresponding Honorary Member of the Royal Institute of British Architects
- 1969 Founding member of the Housing and Environment Institute of the Hessian state government
