= Council of Elders of the Bundestag =

Committee of the German Bundestag

The Council of Elders (German: Ältestenrat, pronounced [ˈɛltəstn̩ˌʁaːt]) of the German parliament Bundestag is a joint deliberative body which includes the following members:

- President;
- Vice presidents;
- Bundestag members appointed by parliamentary groups in proportion to their size. There are twenty-three appointees in all, including parliamentary secretaries of each parliamentary group.

As one of six Organs of the Bundestag, the Council of Elders (under the Rules of Procedure) is tasked with managing the internal affairs of the Bundestag. It is the entity which determines daily legislative agenda items and assigning committee chairpersons based on party representation. The council also serves as an important forum for interparty negotiations on specific legislation and procedural issues.

== Mechanics ==
The Council of Elders performs two functions:

1. Assist the President in the conduct of business and ensure the parliamentary groups reach an agreement;
2. Making decisions on the internal affairs of the Bundestag, provides such activities are without the exclusive competence of the President.

At the beginning of each electoral term, the Council is to reach agreement on the distribution of committee (and deputy) chairs among parliamentary groups. The number, size of committees, as well as the system used to determine their composition, which is proportional to the relative strengths of the parliamentary groups, are decided ultimately by the Bundestag. As a rule, the Council's decisions are based on agreements reached among all the parliamentary groups in the House (cross-party agreements).

While the parliament is in session, the Council of Elders convene weekly at meetings chaired by the President of the Bundestag. A minister of state at the Federal Chancellery or some other representative of the Federal Government is usually in attendance at these meetings.

== Chair distribution ==
Until 1970, the relative strengths of the parliamentary groups were calculated using a process that favoured larger parties. This process, known as the d'Hondt method, was also used to calculate the outcome of federal elections until the Bundestag's tenth term in 1983.

Since then, a system that aims to ensure parity for minority parties has been adopted. In the ninth electoral term (1980), this system was refined by applying the Sainte-Laguë method (or Schepers method.) Using this method, the total number of Members of the Bundestag is divided by the number of members of each parliamentary group; the resulting number is then multiplied progressively by 0.5, 1.5, 2.5 and so on.

These newer calculations produce rank order numbers according to which the seats are then distributed: the first seat is allocated to the parliamentary group with the lowest rank order number, the second seat to the one with the next lowest rank order number, and so on.
