= Kai-Uwe von Hassel =

German politician (1913–1997)

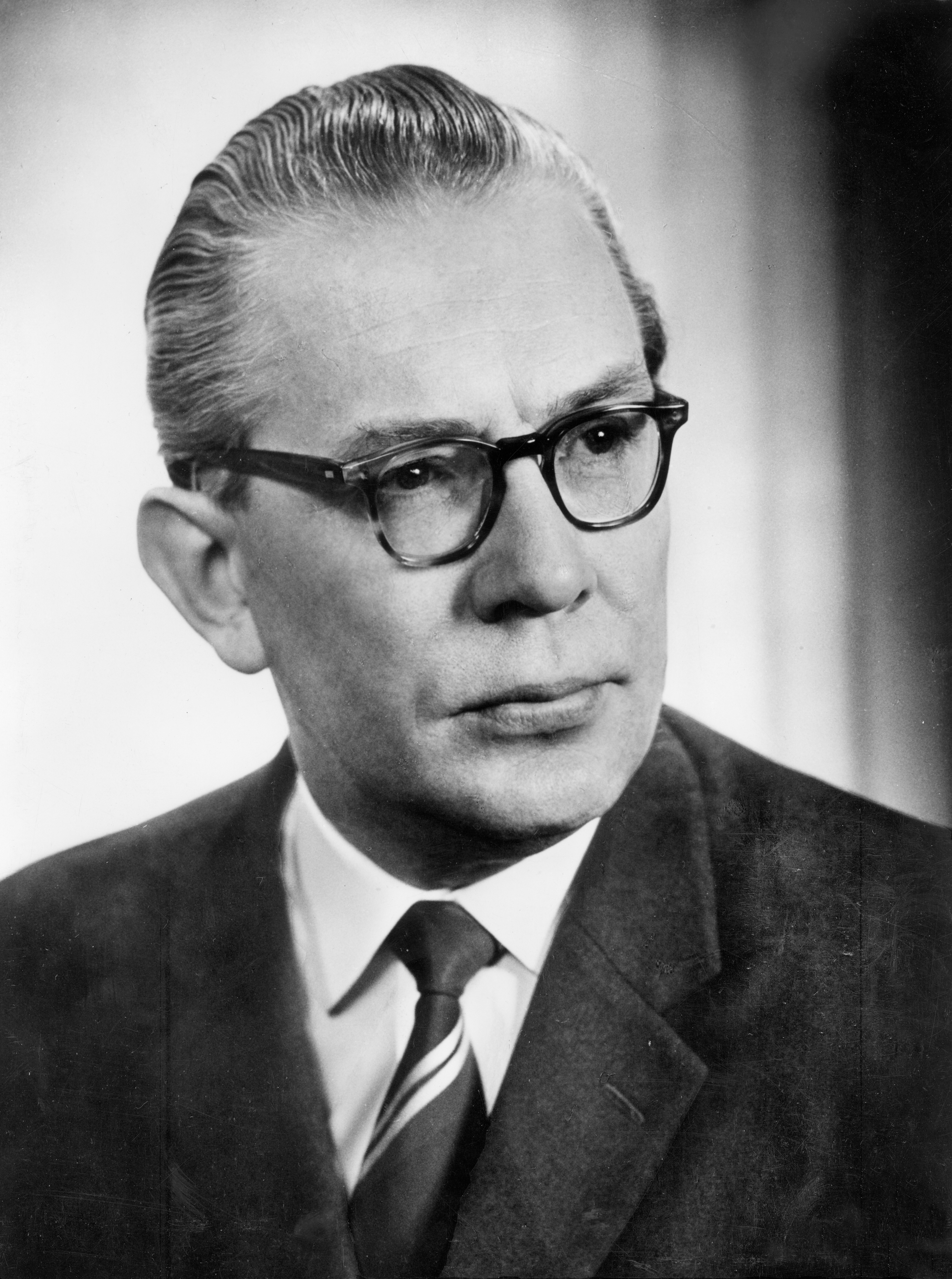
- von Hassel in 1966

President of the Bundestag
- In office 5 February 1969 – 13 December 1972
- Preceded by: Eugen Gerstenmaier
- Succeeded by: Annemarie Renger

Minister for Displaced Persons, Refugees and War Victims
- In office 1 December 1966 – 5 February 1969
- Chancellor: Kurt Georg Kiesinger
- Preceded by: Johann Baptist Gradl
- Succeeded by: Heinrich Windelen

Minister of Defence
- In office 9 January 1963 – 1 December 1966
- Chancellor: Konrad Adenauer; Ludwig Erhard
- Preceded by: Franz Josef Strauß
- Succeeded by: Gerhard Schröder

Minister-President of Schleswig-Holstein
- In office 11 October 1954 – 7 January 1963
- Deputy: Hans-Adolf Asbach; Carl-Anton Schaefer; Bernhard Leverenz; Helmut Lemke
- Preceded by: Friedrich Wilhelm Lübke
- Succeeded by: Helmut Lemke

President of the Bundesrat
- In office 7 September 1955 – 6 September 1956
- First Vice President: Peter Altmeier
- Preceded by: Peter Altmeier
- Succeeded by: Kurt Sieveking
Parliamentary constituencies
Member of the Bundestag for Schleswig-Holstein
In office 19 October 1965 – 4 November 1980
Preceded by	Constituency established
Succeeded by	Kurt Leuschner
Constituency	Steinburg – Dithmarschen Süd
In office 6 October 1953 – 4 November 1954
Preceded by	Johannes Hagge
Succeeded by	Heinrich Reichold
Constituency	Schleswig – Eckernförde
Member of the Landtag of Schleswig-Holstein
In office 27 October 1958 – 2 October 1965
Preceded by	Hanno Schmidt
Succeeded by	Hans Alwin Ketels
Constituency	Flensburg-West
In office 11 October 1954 – 27 October 1958
Preceded by	Constituency established
Succeeded by	Jürgen Thee
Constituency	Schleswig
In office 7 August 1950 – 11 October 1954
Preceded by	Peter Jensen
Succeeded by	Peter Jensen
Constituency	Flensburg-Land-West

Personal details
- Born: 21 April 1913 Gare, German East Africa, German Empire (now Tanga Region, Tanzania)
- Died: 8 May 1997 (aged 84) Aachen, Germany
- Party: Christian Democratic Union (1946–1997)
- Children: 3

Kai-Uwe von Hassel (21 April 1913 – 8 May 1997) was a German politician from Schleswig-Holstein associated with the Christian Democratic Union (CDU). He served as Minister President of Schleswig-Holstein from 1954 to 1963, as Federal Minister of Defence from 1963 to 1966, and as Federal Minister for Displaced Persons, Refugees and War Victims from 1966 to 1969. From 1969 to 1972 he was the fourth president of the Bundestag. Having previously served as President of the Bundesrat in his capacity as Minister-President from 1955 to 1956, he is (as of 2025) the only person to have presided over both of the legislative constitutional bodies of the federal republic.

== Life and career ==
Hassel was born in Gare, German East Africa (now in Lushoto, Tanga Region, Tanzania), where his father Theodor von Hassel (1868–1935) had served as a Schutztruppe officer. After the First World War, the Hassel family was banished from Tanganyika by the British mandate administration and settled in Glücksburg, Schleswig-Holstein. Hassel took his Abitur school-leaving exam in 1933, trained as an agribusiness merchant, and returned to the Tanganyika Territory in 1935. At the beginning of the Second World War he was interned in Dar es Salaam by the British authorities and was again banished to Germany. Drafted into the Wehrmacht armed forces, he served as an interpreter for the Abwehr military intelligence organisation under Admiral Wilhelm Canaris and was decorated with the Iron Cross (2nd Class).

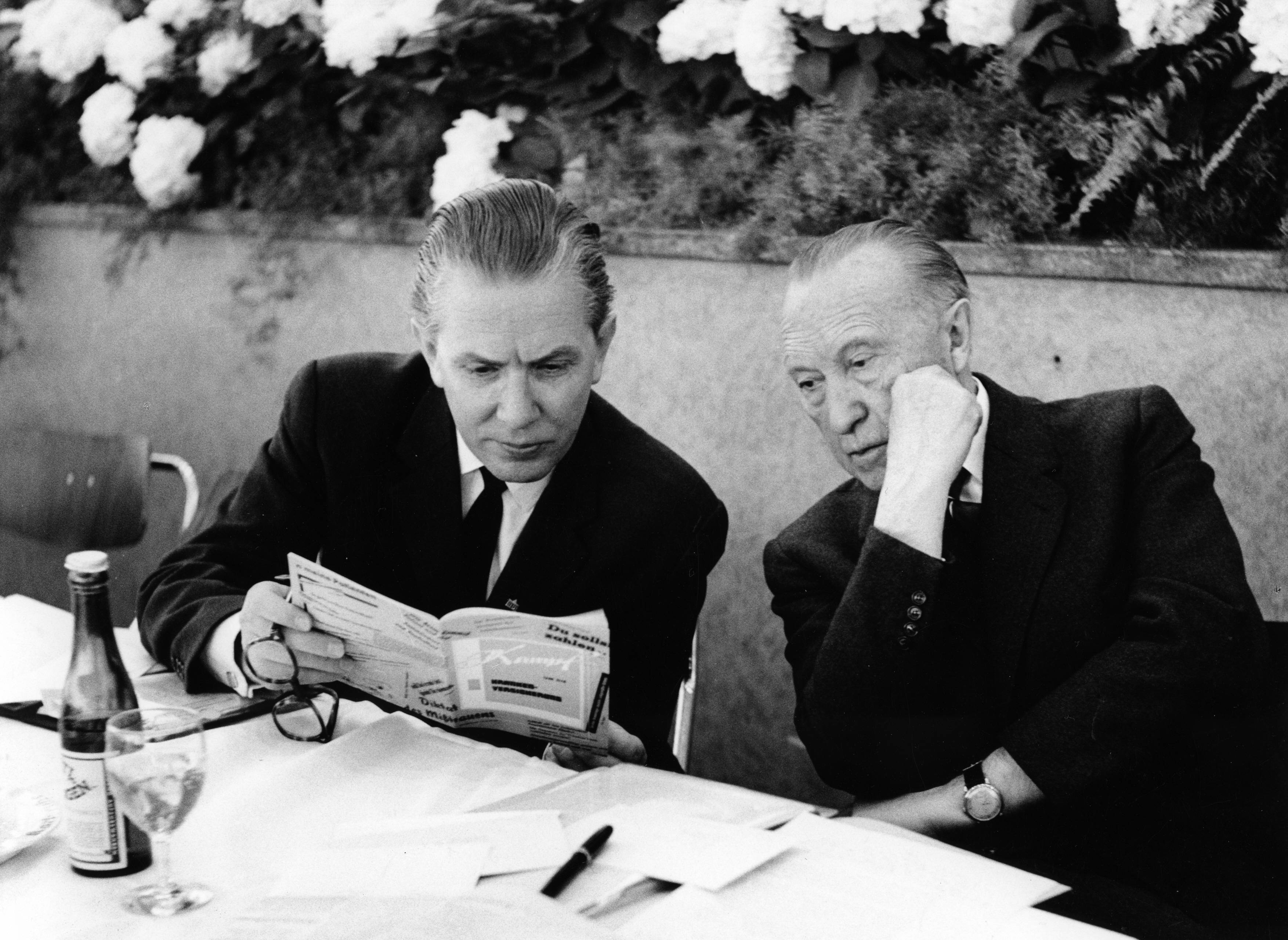
Hassel and Adenauer during a 1960 party conference

After the war, Hassel joined the newly established Christian Democrat party in the Flensburg district and from 1947 served as mayor of Glücksburg. In 1950 he became a member of the Schleswig-Holstein legislature, and at the 1953 federal election a member of the German Bundestag.

On 11 October 1954 Hassel assumed the office of a Minister-President of Schleswig-Holstein. From 1955–1956, he was President of the German Bundesrat. He was closely associated with Ludwig Erhard's two Chancellorships, serving as Minister of Defense from 9 January 1963 to 1 December 1966. In 1963 he secretly asked the United States to supply the Bundeswehr with chemical weapons. He then served in Kurt Georg Kiesinger's cabinet from 1 December 1966 to 21 October 1969 as Minister of Displaced Persons, Refugees, and War Victims. His son Joachim von Hassel, a naval aviator and Oberleutnant zur See, was killed in a Lockheed F-104 Starfighter crash on 10 March 1970.

Following his service in the government, Hassel was president of the Bundestag from 5 February 1969 to 13 December 1972, having been elected when the previous president, Eugen Gerstenmaier, resigned during a financial scandal. In 1979, he was elected to the European Parliament and served for one term, retiring in 1984. He died aged 84, when he suffered a heart attack during the Charlemagne Award ceremony in the Aachen city hall in 1997.

Political offices
Preceded by Franz Josef Strauß	Minister President of Schleswig-Holstein; 1954–1963	Succeeded by Gerhard Schröder
Preceded by Peter Altmeier	President of the Bundesrat; 1955–1956	Succeeded by Kurt Sieveking
Preceded by Franz Josef Strauß	Federal Minister of Defence; 1963–1966	Succeeded by Gerhard Schröder
Preceded by Eugen Gerstenmaier	President of Bundestag; 1969–1972	Succeeded by Annemarie Renger
