= Bundestag =

Federal parliament of Germany

Coordinates: 52°31′07″N 13°22′34″E

German Federal Diet Deutscher Bundestag
- 21st Bundestag

History
- Established: 7 September 1949; 77 years ago
- Preceded by: Historically: Reichstag (Nazi Germany, 1933–1945); De jure: Reichstag (German Reich, 1871–1945)

Leadership
- President: Julia Klöckner, CDU/CSU since 25 March 2025
- Vice presidents: Josephine Ortleb, SPD since 25 March 2025
- Andrea Lindholz, CDU/CSU since 25 March 2025
- Omid Nouripour, Alliance 90/The Greens since 25 March 2025
- Bodo Ramelow, The Left since 25 March 2025
- President by right of age: Gregor Gysi, The Left since 25 March 2025
- Chancellor: Friedrich Merz, CDU/CSU since 6 May 2025
- Leader of the Opposition (Note: Though the by-laws of the Bundestag do not mention such a position, the leader of the largest opposition Fraktion is called leader of the opposition by convention.): Alice Weidel and Tino Chrupalla, AfD since 6 May 2025

Structure
- Seats: 630
- Political groups: Government (Merz cabinet) (328) CDU/CSU (208) CDU (164) CSU (44) SPD (120); Opposition (302) AfD (150) The Greens (85) The Left (64) Non-attached (3) (Note: These non-attached members comprise Stefan Seidler, a representative of the SSW; Jan Wenzel Schmidt, formerly a member of the AfD group but still a member of that party; and Sieghard Knodel, who left both the AfD group and the party.)

Elections
- Voting system: Personalised proportional representation
- Last election: 23 February 2025
- Next election: On or before 25 March 2029

Meeting place
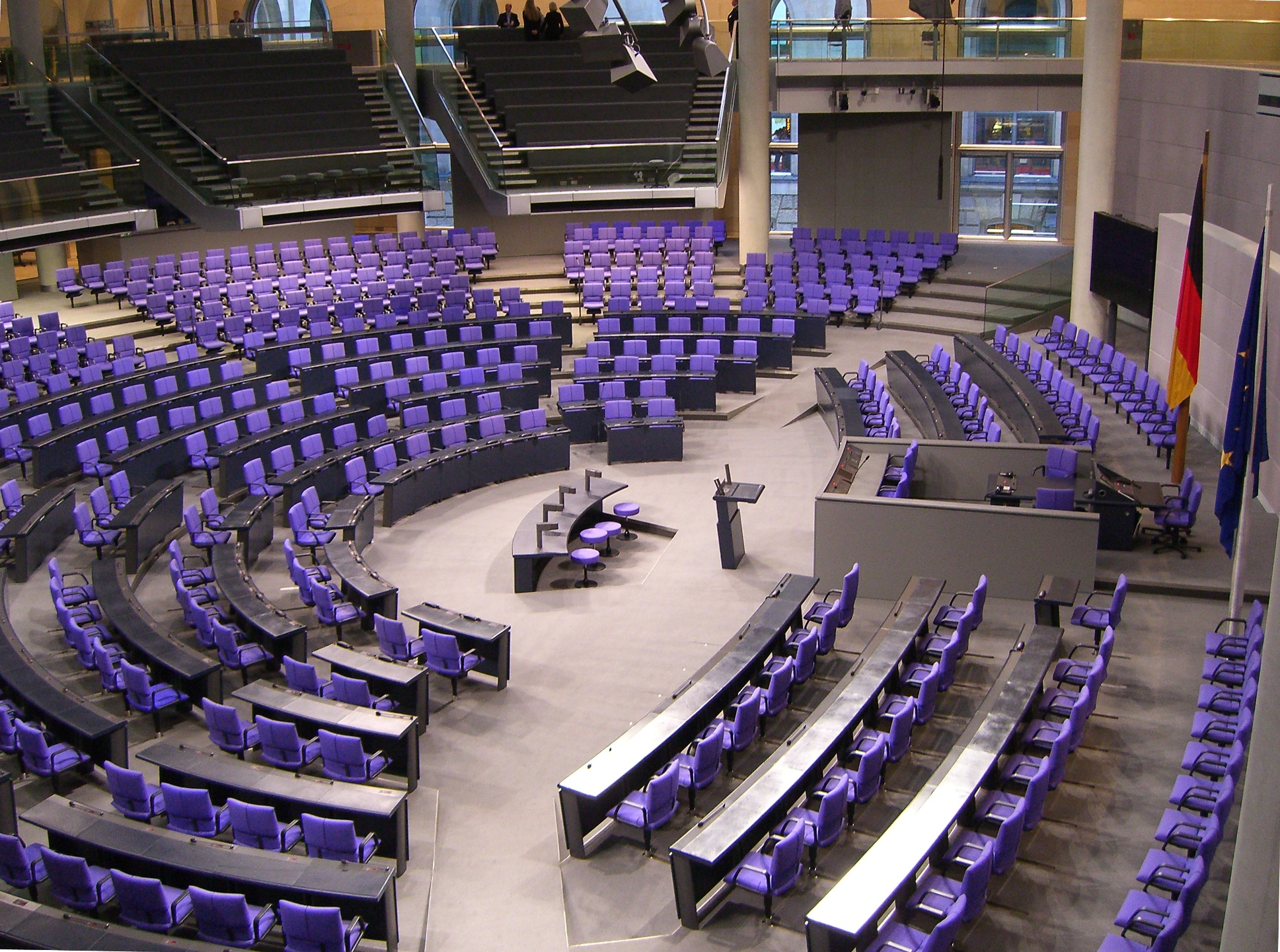
- Reichstag building Mitte, Berlin, Germany

Website
- bundestag.de

Constitution
- Basic Law for the Federal Republic of Germany

Rules
- Rules of Procedure of the German Bundestag and Mediation Committee (English)

The Bundestag (German pronunciation: [ˈbʊndəstaːk], 'Federal Diet') is the federal parliament of Germany. It is the only constitutional body in the country directly elected by the German people. The Bundestag was established by Title III (Note: Articles 38 to 49) of the Basic Law for the Federal Republic of Germany (Grundgesetz) in 1949 as one of the legislative bodies of Germany, the other being the Bundesrat.

The members of the Bundestag are representatives of the German people as a whole, are not bound by any orders or instructions and are only accountable to their conscience. (Note: Article 38 Section 1 Grundgesetz) Since the current 21st legislative period, the Bundestag has a fixed number of 630 members. The Bundestag is elected every four years by German citizens (Note: German Citizens are defined in Article 116 Grundgesetz) aged 18 and older. (Note: Article 38 Section 2 Grundgesetz: Any person who has attained the age of eighteen shall be entitled to vote; any person who has attained the age of majority may be elected.) Elections use a proportional representation system which combines first-past-the-post voting for constituency-seats with proportional representation to ensure its composition mirrors the national popular vote. The German Bundestag cannot dissolve itself; only the president of Germany can do so under certain conditions.

Together with the Bundesrat, the Bundestag forms the legislative branch of government at the federal level. The Bundestag is considerably more powerful than the Bundesrat, which represents the state governments. All bills must first be passed in the Bundestag before they are discussed in the Bundesrat. The Bundesrat can only accept laws passed by the Bundestag without amendment. Only in some areas, where laws directly affect the states, can the Bundesrat reject laws; otherwise, it can only lodge an objection to them, which the Bundestag can overrule. Above all, however, the chancellor and the federal government are solely responsible to the Bundestag. The Bundestag also has sole budgetary authority.

Since 1999, the Bundestag has met in the Reichstag building in Berlin. The Bundestag also operates in multiple new government buildings in Berlin around the neo-renaissance house and has its own police force (the Bundestagspolizei), directly subordinated to the Bundestag Presidency. The Bundestag's presiding officer is the president of the Bundestag; they are deputized by the Vice Presidents of the Bundestag. Since 2025, Julia Klöckner of the CDU/CSU is the president of the Bundestag. In the protocol order of the federation, the President of the Bundestag ranks second after the President and before the Chancellor.

== History ==
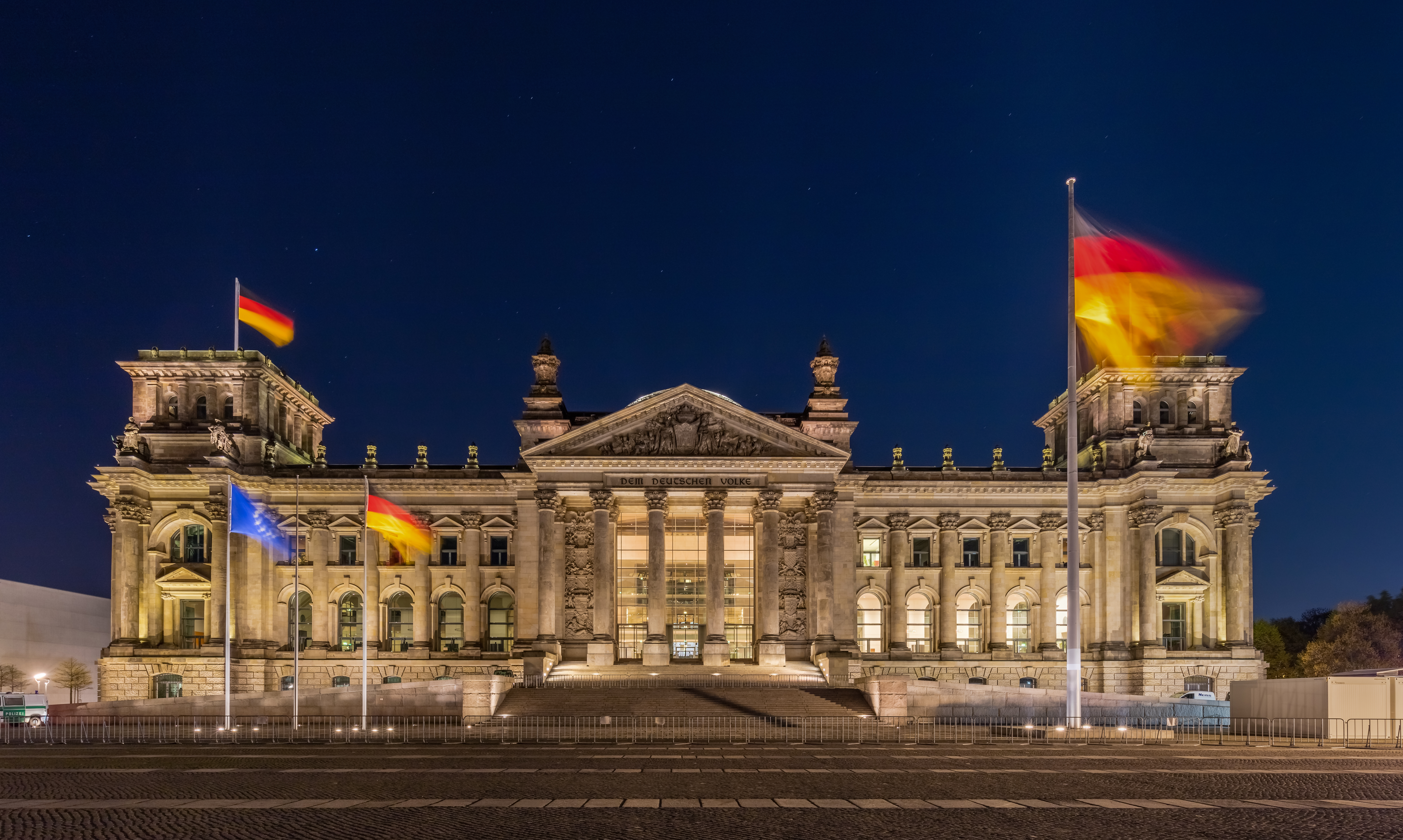
The German Unity Flag is a national memorial to German reunification that was raised on 3 October 1990; it waves in front of the Reichstag building in Berlin, seat of the Bundestag.

The first body to be called Bundestag was the legislative body of the German Confederation, which convened in Frankfurt am Main from 1816 to 1866. This Bundestag was a convention of state envoys. During the revolution of 1848/49, the National Assembly, which met in Frankfurt am Main, was the first elected German parliament and served as a constituent assembly for a German state, which ultimately did not come to pass.

The North German Confederation, founded in 1866/67, was the first German nation state with an established elected parliament, however this ended up being called the Reichstag. In 1870/71, the federation was expanded to include the southern German territories and was henceforth called the German Empire. The Reichstag building, where the current Bundestag meets since 1999 (see below), was built in 1888. The German Empire was not yet a parliamentary democracy in the modern sense, but a constitutional monarchy with democratic elements. The Reichstag had to approve all bills, had the right to initiate legislation and, in particular, had budgetary sovereignty. However, the Chancellor and the imperial government were not responsible to parliament, but to the emperor alone. It was not until 1918, a few weeks before the end of the First World War, that the Reichstag was given the right, as part of a constitutional reform, to withdraw its confidence in the Chancellor and thus force him to resign. There was also no universal suffrage for the Reichstag; only men over the age of 25 were entitled to vote in Reichstag elections.

After its defeat in the First World War, Germany became a republic and a parliamentary democracy with the Weimar Constitution of 1919. The voting age was lowered to 21 years and women were given the right to vote for (and serve in) the Reichstag. However, the first German democracy failed for various reasons, some of which were directly related to the Reichstag. The pure proportional representation system in elections did not produce clear majorities and the various parties were not sufficiently willing to compromise to form stable governments. This led to numerous changes of government and snap elections. In the last years of the Weimar Republic, opposition parties on the far-right and the far-left held the majority of seats in the Reichstag, which led the governments to rule largely by emergency decrees and bypass parliament. In 1933, Adolf Hitler was appointed chancellor and through the Reichstag Fire Decree, the Enabling Act of 1933 and the death of President Paul von Hindenburg in 1934, gained unlimited power. After this, the Reichstag, in which only the Nazi Party was represented from November 1933 on, met only rarely, above all to extend the emergency laws on which the Nazi dictatorship was formally based. It last convened on 26 April 1942.

With the Basic Law of 1949, Germany's second democratic constitution, the Bundestag was established as the new parliament. Due to the division of Germany, the Bundestag was de facto a West German parliament until 1990. The socialist GDR in East Germany had its own parliament, the Volkskammer, which, however, did not emerge from democratic elections except for its last electoral term in 1990. Because West Berlin was not officially under the jurisdiction of the Basic Law during the division, the Bundestag met in Bonn in several different buildings, including (provisionally) a former waterworks facility and finally in the Bundeshaus. In addition, owing to the city's legal status, citizens of West Berlin were unable to vote in elections to the Bundestag, and were instead represented by 22 non-voting delegates chosen by the House of Representatives, the city's legislature.

Since German reunification in 1990, the Bundestag has once again been an all-German parliament. In 1999, the German parliament moved from Bonn to Berlin and sits once again in the Reichstag building.

== Tasks ==
=== Legislative process ===
Together with the Bundesrat, the Bundestag forms the legislative branch of the German political system.

The Bundestag is one of three constitutional bodies (along with the Bundesrat and the federal government) that have the right of initiative for the legislative process. In order to introduce a bill in the Bundestag, the support of a faction or of a number of MPs corresponding to at least 5% of all MPs is required. All bills (including those introduced by the Bundesrat and the government) are first voted on in the Bundestag (for bills from the Bundesrat and the government, however, an opinion must first be obtained from the other body). A bill is first discussed at first reading, then referred to one or more committees, where it can be amended; the resulting committee version then goes back to the plenary, where it is passed at second and third reading. Amendments can also be tabled at this stage. A simple majority (more yes votes than no votes with no regard to abstentions) is required for normal legislative proposals. In some very rare cases, the Basic Law requires the so-called chancellor majority (majority of all members of parliament) for simple laws, for example to establish new intermediate and subordinate federal authorities. Laws amending the Basic Law require a two-thirds majority of all members of the Bundestag.

A law passed by the Bundestag is passed on to the Bundesrat. Amendments to the Basic Law and laws that directly affect the states must be passed by the Bundesrat by majority vote (amendments to the Basic Law, again, by a two-thirds majority); all other laws are considered passed if the Bundesrat does not object to them within 14 days. An objection by the Bundesrat can be overruled by the Bundestag with a chancellor majority if the Bundesrat has not raised the objection with a two-thirds majority (in the latter case, in order to override an objection, a two-thirds majority of members present corresponding at least to the chancellor majority is necessary). In no case can the Bundesrat make amendments to a bill. If the Bundesrat rejects a bill, the matter is often referred to the so-called mediation committee, a body made up of an equal number of members of the Bundestag and Bundesrat, which attempts to negotiate whether the bill can find the approval of both chambers with certain amendments. A version amended in this way must then be passed again by a majority in both chambers in order to become law (in this case the rules of procedure of both chambers provide for an abbreviated legislative procedure).

In the final step, a law must be signed by the President of Germany (they have a right of veto in theory, but this has been used very rarely in the history of the Federal Republic).

=== Elections ===
The Bundestag has an elective function for a number of offices.

==== Chancellor ====
The chancellor is elected by the Bundestag and formally appointed by the president of Germany. A chancellor's election is necessary whenever the office of chancellor has fallen vacant. This is the case if a newly elected Bundestag meets for the first time, or during legislative periods, if the former chancellor died or resigned.

The chancellor's election is one of the few cases in which a vote in the Bundestag requires a majority of all elected members, not just a majority of those assembled at the time, the so-called Kanzlermehrheit ("chancellor majority"). As with other elections performed by the Bundestag, the chancellor is elected via secret ballot. The election procedure laid down in the Basic Law can be divided into three phases: The process begins with the President of Germany proposing a candidate to the Bundestag (usually a candidate on which the majority party or the coalition parties have agreed to beforehand), who is then voted upon without debate ("1st voting phase"). If the nominee reaches the necessary "chancellor majority", the president appoints him or her and, after that, the president of the Bundestag will administer the oath of office before the assembled house. If this nominee is not elected, the right of nomination is transferred onto the Bundestag: Candidates can now be nominated for election, whereby a nomination must be supported by at least a quarter of all MPs. The Bundestag can hold any number of ballots in this manner for two weeks. To be elected, a candidate still needs a "chancellor majority" of yes-votes ("Second voting phase"). If the Bundestag is unable to elect a chancellor in these fourteen days, a final ballot is held on the very next day. Once again, candidates can be nominated by at least a quarter of all MPs. Candidates receiving a "chancellor majority" in this ballot are elected. Otherwise, it is up to the President of Germany either to appoint the candidate with the plurality of votes as Chancellor or to dissolve the Bundestag and call new elections ("Third voting phase").

Another possibility to vote a new chancellor into office is the constructive vote of no confidence, which allows the Bundestag to replace a sitting chancellor, if it elects a new chancellor with the "chancellor-majority".

As of 2025, all chancellors of the federal republic have been (re-)elected on proposal of the President and on the first ballot with the exceptions of Helmut Kohl, who was elected to his first term via a constructive vote of no confidence against Helmut Schmidt in 1982, and Friedrich Merz, who was elected chancellor during the second voting phase (on the second ballot), after not having received the necessary majority on the first ballot in 2025.

==== Judges of the federal constitutional court ====
The Bundestag shares responsibility with the Bundesrat for electing the judges of the Federal Constitutional Court. Both chambers elect four judges to each of the court's two senates. They also elect the president and vice-president of the Federal Constitutional Court in alternating order. In the Bundestag, this requires a two-thirds majority of members present, which has equal at least a majority of all members.

==== Further elective functions ====
In addition to these central elections, the Bundestag elects the President and Vice President of the Federal Audit Office, the Commissioner for the Armed Forces, the Federal Commissioner for Data Protection and Freedom of Information, the Federal Commissioner for the Victims of the SED Dictatorship, two-thirds of the members of the Joint Committee and half of the members of the Mediation Committee.

The Bundestag also has significant influence on the election of the President of Germany: All members of the Bundestag are ex officio members of the Federal Convention, a non-permanent constitutional body whose sole task is to elect the president; however, the convention also includes state electors, elected by the 16 German state parliaments. The majority ratios in the Bundestag therefore do not necessarily have to correspond to those in the Federal Assembly.

== Electoral term and principle of discontinuation ==
The Bundestag within the political system of Germany

The Bundestag is elected for four years, and new elections must be held no earlier than 46 and no later than 48 months after the beginning of a given legislative term.

By way of exception, there may be an early election if the President of Germany dissolves the Bundestag. However, the President only has the right to do so in the event of a failed chancellor election or if an incumbent chancellor requests dissolution after losing a vote of confidence. The possibility of an early election is therefore in theory much more limited than is the case in some other parliamentary democracies. This restriction is intended to encourage the parliamentary groups to cooperate in difficult situations, and is a lesson learned from the experience of the Weimar Republic, in which snap elections were very frequent because the parties were unable to compromise and form stable governments. In constitutional reality however, the deliberately lost vote of confidence (also known as a false vote of confidence) has established itself as a way for the chancellor to bring about new elections, de facto at his or her discretion (this has happened four times so far: 1972, 1982/83, 2005 and 2024/25). (Note: In contrast, there have only been two "genuine" votes of confidence (1982 and 2001) that the chancellor actually intended to win.)

A legislative term ends at the moment when a newly-elected Bundestag convenes for the first time, which must occur within 30 days after an election. The principle applies that there can be no "period without parliament". An elected Bundestag is fully competent to act until a newly-elected Bundestag convenes for its first session. Prorogations and dissolutions (in the strict sense), as known in the Westminster system, do not exist in Germany. Even an early dissolution of the Bundestag, as described above, in practice only leads to an early election, but does not end the legislative period itself. Before a constitutional amendment in 1976, a "Standing Committee" took the place of the Bundestag once its term expired (which happened after dissolution by the President or 48 months after its constitution) and until a new Bundestag was constituted; the 1976 amendment introduced the current system of fully continuous terms, where the outgoing Bundestag's term only ends when the new Bundestag convenes for the first time, meaning that lame duck sessions can occur in the four weeks following an election. This has happened four times so far:

Legislative term	Plenary meeting	Date	Reason or subject	Plenary protocol
13th	248th	16 October 1998	Government statement by Foreign Minister Klaus Kinkel Resolution on participation in the air operations planned by NATO in the Kosovo conflict	
15th	187th	26 September 2005	Resolution on continuation of the participation of armed German forces in the deployment of an International Security Assistance Force in Afghanistan under NATO leadership	
20th	213th	13 March 2025	Motion to amend the Basic Law (amendment of Art. 109 and 115 and introduction of Art. 143 h), first reading	
20th	214th	18 March 2025	Motion to amend the Basic Law (amendment of Art. 109 and 115 and introduction of Art. 143 h), second and third reading	

Following the tradition of German parliamentarism, the Bundestag is subject to the principle of discontinuation, meaning that a newly-elected Bundestag is legally regarded as a body and entity completely different from the previous Bundestag. This leads to the result that any motion, application or action submitted to the previous Bundestag, e.g. a bill referred to the Bundestag by the Federal Government, is regarded as void by non-decision (German terminology: "Die Sache fällt der Diskontinuität anheim"). Thus any bill that has not been decided upon by the beginning of the new electoral period must be brought up by the government again if it aims to uphold the motion, this procedure in effect delaying the passage of the bill. Furthermore, any newly-elected Bundestag will have to freshly decide on the rules of procedure (Geschäftsordnung), which is done by a formal decision of taking over such rules from the preceding Bundestag by reference. If the succeeding Bundestag convenes with same or similar majorities like its predecessor, the parliament can decide to take over earlier initiatives of legislation in the same fashion to abbreviate the process, thus effectively breaking the principle of discontinuation by a pull.

== Election and membership ==
=== Election system (since 2023) ===
After the imperial Reichstag was elected according to a pure first-past-the-post electoral system (with run-off elections) and the Reichstag of the Weimar Republic according to a pure proportional representation system, mixed-member proportional representation, a system combining proportional representation with elements of first-past-the-post voting, has been used for the Bundestag since the 1949 founding of the Federal Republic until 2023. Before an electoral reform in 2023, the Bundestag nominally had 598 members, with the mixture of majority and proportional representation regularly leading to a large number of additional overhang and compensation mandates.

In 2023, this was remedied with a series of modifications that led to a fixed number of seats of 630 and significantly increased the proportional aspect, removing guaranteed constituency seats via a winner-take-all system, thereby making the system no longer mixed proportional, but a personalised and localised proportional one. After this revised electoral law was confirmed by the Federal Constitutional Court with some modifications following constitutional complaints, it was applied for the first time in 2025.

Every elector has two votes: a constituency vote (first vote) and a party list vote (second vote). Based solely on the first votes, 299 members are elected in single-member constituencies by first-past-the-post voting. The second votes are used to produce proportionality with respect to the total number of 630 seats; first at the federal level and then at state level (using the Sainte-Laguë method). In most cases, the number of constituencies won by a party in a given state does not exactly correspond to the number of seats to which the party is entitled in that state via second votes. This is balanced in two different ways:

- If a party wins fewer constituencies in a state than it is entitled to based on the second-vote result, the highest-placed candidates from the state list are elected accordingly to the additional seats.
- If a party wins more constituency seats in a state than its second votes would entitle it to, only the corresponding number of constituency winners with the highest percentage of first votes are elected. The remaining constituency winners for that party are not elected. (Note: Before 2023, overhang seats were added for the surplus constituency seats a party had won, and levelling seats added to maintain the proportional share of other parties. Levelling seats were also added to maintain the proportional share of seats between different states.)

To qualify for any seats, however, a party must either win three single-member constituencies via first votes (basic mandate clause) or exceed a threshold of 5% of the second votes nationwide. This does not apply to independent constituency candidates: these always enter the Bundestag if they win their constituency. (However, no independent constituency candidate has won a constituency since 1949). Seats allocated in this way are subtracted from the base number of 630 when the mandates are distributed among the parties. In addition, the second votes of voters who have elected a successful independent candidate in a constituency are not taken into account when calculating the number of mandates (although they are for the 5% threshold).

Parties representing recognized national minorities (currently Danes, Frisians, Sorbs, and Romani people) are exempt from both the 5% national threshold and the basic mandate clause. The only party that has been able to benefit from this provision so far at the federal level is the South Schleswig Voters' Association, which represents the minorities of Danes and Frisians in Schleswig-Holstein, and succeeded in winning a seat in 1949, 2021, and 2025.

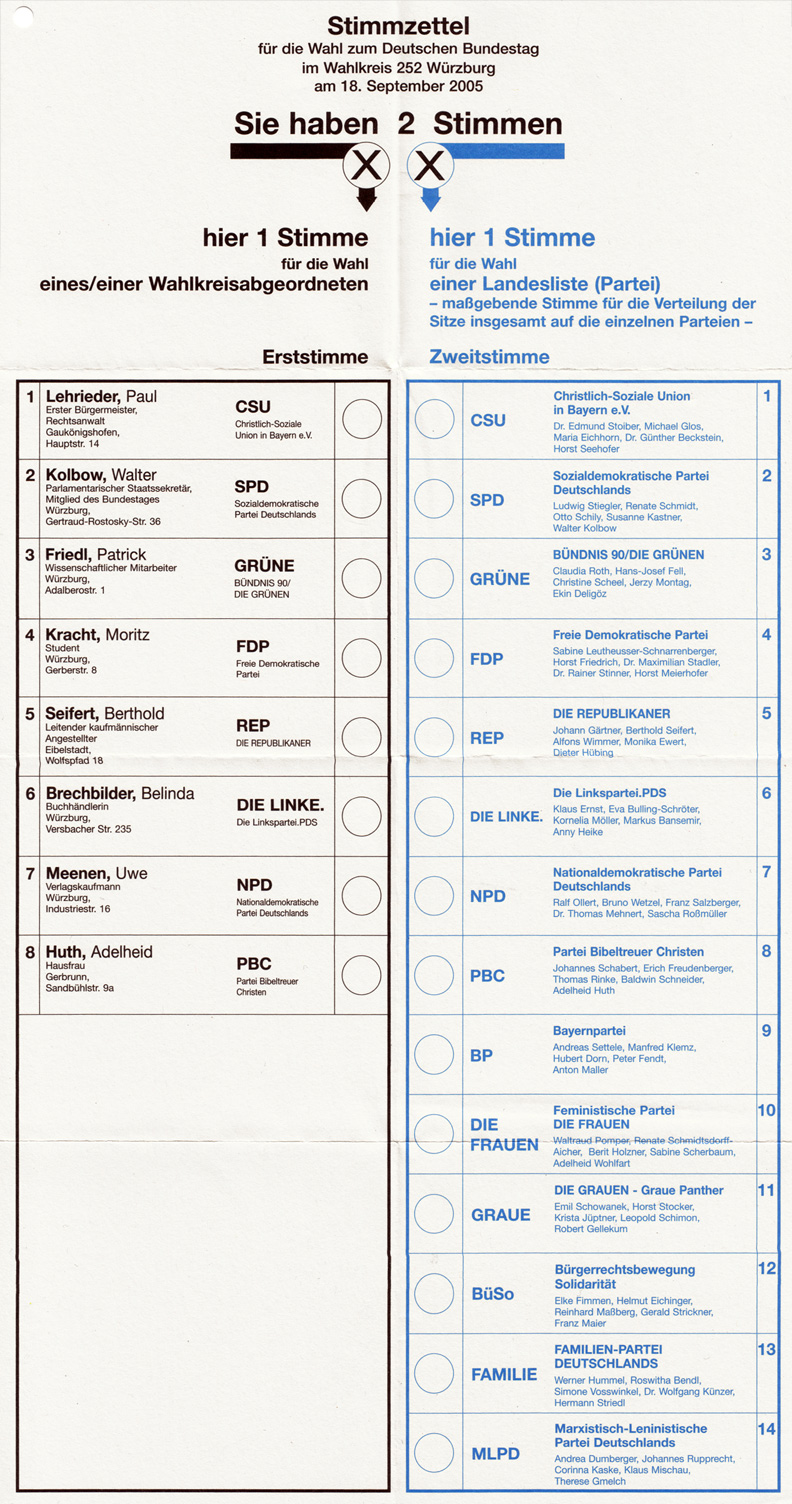
Bundestag ballot from the 2005 election in the Würzburg district. The column for the constituency vote (with the name, occupation, and address of each candidate) is on the left in black print; the column for the party list vote (showing top five list candidates in the state) is on the right in blue print.

=== Succession in case of early retirement ===
If a member of parliament leaves the Bundestag during the current legislative term, either through resignation or death, another candidate from that party from the corresponding state takes their place. Successful constituency candidates who did not receive a seat in the previous election due to the principle of second vote coverage are considered first, followed by the candidates on the respective state list. However, if the list is exhausted, the seat in question remains vacant for the remainder of the term. If the departing member was an independent constituency candidate, the seat also remains empty.

== Latest election result ==
=== Regular election of 2025 ===
The latest federal election was held on Sunday, 23 February 2025, to elect the members of the 21st Bundestag.

Party	Party list			Constituency			Total seats	+/–
Party	Votes	%	Seats	Votes	%	Seats	Total seats	+/–
Christian Democratic Union	11,194,700	22.55	36	12,601,967	25.46	128	164	+12
Alternative for Germany	10,327,148	20.80	110	10,175,438	20.56	42	152	+69
Social Democratic Party	8,148,284	16.41	76	9,934,614	20.07	44	120	–86
Alliance 90/The Greens	5,761,476	11.61	73	5,442,912	11.00	12	85	–33
The Left	4,355,382	8.77	58	3,932,584	7.94	6	64	+25
Christian Social Union	2,963,732	5.97	0	3,271,730	6.61	44	44	–1
Sahra Wagenknecht Alliance	2,468,670	4.97	0	299,226	0.60	0	0	New
Free Democratic Party	2,148,878	4.33	0	1,623,351	3.28	0	0	–91
Free Voters	769,170	1.55	0	1,254,488	2.53	0	0	0
Human Environment Animal Protection Party	482,032	0.97	0	82,485	0.17	0	0	0
Volt Germany	355,146	0.72	0	391,577	0.79	0	0	0
Die PARTEI	242,806	0.49	0	122,386	0.25	0	0	0
Grassroots Democratic Party of Germany	85,557	0.17	0	41,903	0.08	0	0	0
Bündnis Deutschland	79,012	0.16	0	88,046	0.18	0	0	New
South Schleswig Voters' Association	76,126	0.15	1	58,773	0.12	0	1	0
Ecological Democratic Party	49,730	0.10	0	54,641	0.11	0	0	0
Team Todenhöfer	24,558	0.05	0	9,757	0.02	0	0	0
Party of Progress	21,377	0.04	0	1,282	0.00	0	0	0
Marxist–Leninist Party of Germany	19,876	0.04	0	24,208	0.05	0	0	0
Party of Humanists	14,446	0.03	0	1,873	0.00	0	0	0
Pirate Party Germany	13,809	0.03	0	2,152	0.00	0	0	0
Bavaria Party	12,315	0.02	0	5,784	0.01	0	0	0
Alliance C – Christians for Germany	11,784	0.02	0	2,021	0.00	0	0	0
MERA25	7,128	0.01	0	658	0.00	0	0	New
Values Union	6,803	0.01	0	2,844	0.01	0	0	New
Bürgerrechtsbewegung Solidarität	719	0.00	0	1,303	0.00	0	0	0
Human World	694	0.00	0				0	0
Socialist Equality Party	425	0.00	0	73	0.00	0	0	0
Party for Rejuvenation Research	304	0.00	0				0	0
Independents				70,110	0.14	0	0	0
Total	49,642,087	100.00	354	49,498,186	100.00	276	630	–105
Valid votes	49,642,087	99.43		49,498,186	99.14			
Invalid/blank votes	285,228	0.57		429,129	0.86			
Total votes	49,927,315	100.00		49,927,315	100.00			
Registered voters/turnout	60,490,603	82.54		60,490,603	82.54			
Source: Federal Returning Officer

== List of Bundestag by term ==
Seat distribution in the German Bundestag (at the beginning of each term)
Term	Election	Seats	CDU/CSU	SPD	FDP	Greens (Note: 1983 to 1994 The Greens and 1990 to 1994 Alliance 90, since 1994 Alliance 90/The Greens)	The Left (Note: 1990 to 2005 PDS (Party of Democratic Socialism), 2005 to 2007 The Left Party.PDS, since 2007 The Left)	AfD	Others Sonstige
1st	1949	402	139	131	52	–	–	–	80 (Note: DP 17, BP 17, KPD 15, WAV 12, Centre Party 10, DKP-DRP 5, SSW 1, Independents 3)
2nd	1953	487	243	151	48	–	–	–	45 (Note: DP 15, GB/BHE 27, Centre Party 3)
3rd	1957	497	270	169	41	–	–	–	17
4th	1961	499	242	190	67	–	–	–	–
5th	1965	496	245	202	49	–	–	–	–
6th	1969	496	242	224	30	–	–	–	–
7th	1972	496	225	230	41	–	–	–	–
8th	1976	496	243	214	39	–	–	–	–
9th	1980	497	226	218	53	–	–	–	–
10th	1983	498	244	193	34	27	–	–	–
11th	1987	497	223	186	46	42	–	–	–
12th	1990	662	319	239	79	8	17	–	–
13th	1994	672	294	252	47	49	30	–	–
14th	1998	669	245	298	43	47	36	–	–
15th	2002	603	248	251	47	55	2	–	–
16th	2005	614	226	222	61	51	54	–	–
17th	2009	622	239	146	93	68	76	–	–
18th	2013	630	311	192	–	63	64	–	–
19th	2017	709	246	153	80	67	69	94	–
20th	2021	736(735) (Note: The FDP lost a seat in the repeat of a small part of the election in 2024.)	197	206	92(91)	118	39	83	1 (Note: SSW)
21st	2025	630	208	120	–	85	64	152	1

Parties in the ruling coalition
View source data.

Timeline of the political parties represented in the Bundestag
1940s	1950s										1960s										1970s										1980s										1990s										2000s										2010s										2020s
9	0	1	2	3	4	5	6	7	8	9	0	1	2	3	4	5	6	7	8	9	0	1	2	3	4	5	6	7	8	9	0	1	2	3	4	5	6	7	8	9	0	1	2	3	4	5	6	7	8	9	0	1	2	3	4	5	6	7	8	9	0	1	2	3	4	5	6	7	8	9	0	1	2	3	4	5
CSU
CDU
Centre
BP
	BHE		GB/BHE													GDP																									DSU																											AfD
DP								DP
FDP							FVP	DP
FDP							FDP																																																													FDP
WAV
SSW																																																																								SSW
																																		Greens												Alliance 90/Greens
																																									Greens/Alliance 90					Alliance 90/Greens
SPD																																																								SPD
SPD																																																								WASG		Die Linke																	Die Linke	Die Linke
KPD																																									PDS																	Die Linke																	BSW	Die Linke
NDP	DRP
DRP	DRP

== Presidents since 1949 ==
Presidents of the Bundestag
No.	Name	Party	Beginning of term	End of term	Length of term
1	Erich Köhler (1892–1958)	CDU	7 September 1949	18 October 1950 (Note: Resigned for medical reasons)	1 year, 41 days
2	Hermann Ehlers (1904–1954)	CDU	19 October 1950	29 October 1954 (Note: Died in office)	4 years, 10 days
3	Eugen Gerstenmaier (1906–1986)	CDU	16 November 1954	31 January 1969 (Note: Resigned for political reasons)	14 years, 76 days
4	Kai-Uwe von Hassel (1913–1997)	CDU	5 February 1969	13 December 1972	3 years, 312 days
5	Annemarie Renger (Note: First woman to hold the post) (1919–2008)	SPD	13 December 1972	14 December 1976	4 years, 1 day
6	Karl Carstens (1914–1992)	CDU	14 December 1976	31 May 1979 (Note: Elected President of Germany)	2 years, 168 days
7	Richard Stücklen (1916–2002)	CSU	31 May 1979	29 March 1983	3 years, 363 days
8	Rainer Barzel (1924–2006)	CDU	29 March 1983	25 October 1984	1 year, 210 days
9	Philipp Jenninger (1932–2018)	CDU	5 November 1984	11 November 1988	4 years, 6 days
10	Rita Süssmuth (1937–2026)	CDU	25 November 1988	26 October 1998	9 years, 335 days
11	Wolfgang Thierse (b. 1943)	SPD	26 October 1998	18 October 2005	6 years, 357 days
12	Norbert Lammert (b. 1948)	CDU	18 October 2005	24 October 2017	12 years, 6 days
13	Wolfgang Schäuble (1942–2023)	CDU	24 October 2017	26 October 2021	4 years, 2 days
14	Bärbel Bas (b. 1968)	SPD	26 October 2021	25 March 2025	3 years, 150 days
15	Julia Klöckner (b. 1972)	CDU	25 March 2025	present	1 year, 242 days

== Organization ==
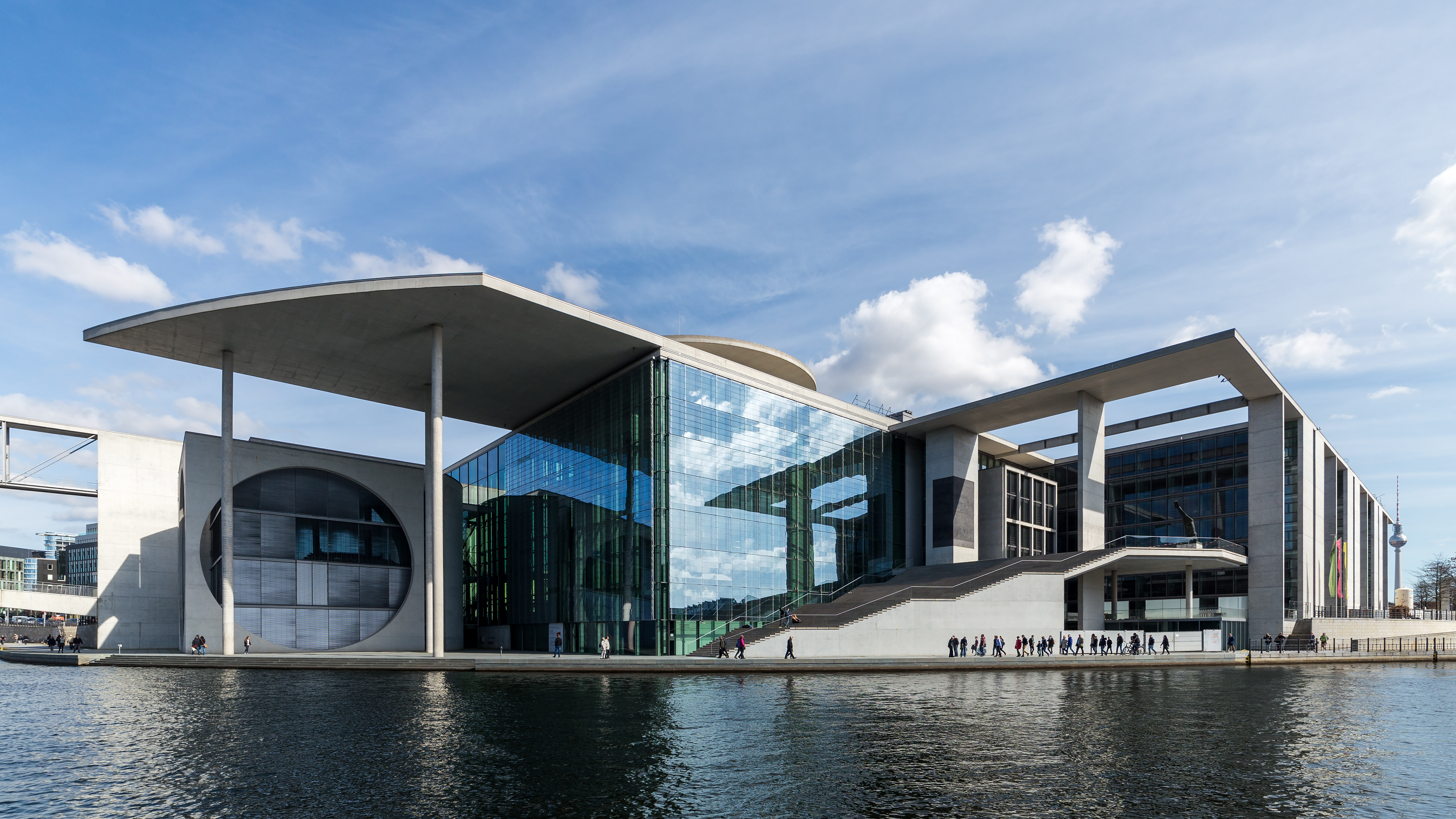
The Marie-Elisabeth-Lüders-Haus, one of the official buildings of the complex, housing the parliamentary library

=== Presidium and Council of Elders ===
The executive bodies of the Bundestag are the Presidium and the Council of Elders. The Presidium consists of the President, the presiding officer, and several Vice Presidents. The President and Vice Presidents are elected by the plenary of the Bundestag, whereby traditionally the largest fraction nominates the President and each fraction may nominate a vice president. In addition to the members of the Presidium, the Council of Elders includes 23 other deputies who are delegated proportionally by the factions. The council is the coordination hub, determining the daily legislative agenda and assigning committee chairpersons based on Parliamentary group representation. The council also serves as an important forum for interparty negotiations on specific legislation and procedural issues. The Presidium is responsible for the routine administration of the Bundestag, including its clerical and research activities.

=== Legislative calendar ===
The Bundestag cannot be adjourned or prorogued during the current legislative term, but is always fully capable of acting and sets its own legislative calendar. Normally, the Bundestag sits for at least twenty weeks per year, interrupted by non-sessional weeks, especially a long parliamentary summer recess, during which the MPs are present in their constituencies. The course of a session week is traditionally always the same: meetings of the parliamentary faction's internal committees take place on Monday and Tuesday mornings, and meetings in the faction-plenary on Tuesday afternoon. From Wednesday to Friday, plenary sessions and committee meetings take place in parallel (this is the reason why often very few members are present at plenary debates). Committee meetings are interrupted on very important items on the agenda so that all MPs have the opportunity to be present in the plenary hall. The highlights of the procedures include government statements by the Chancellor and the general debate at the beginning of the annual budget deliberations, during which there is a direct clash between the Chancellor and the opposition leader.

Independently of the usual procedure, the Bundestag can also convene for extraordinary sessions at any time. This must happen if one third of the MPs, the President of Germany or the Chancellor request it (Basic Law, Article 39.3).

=== Factions and groups ===
The most important organisational structures within the Bundestag are 'factions' (Fraktionen; sing. Fraktion). A parliamentary faction must consist of at least 5% of all members of parliament. Members of parliament from different parties may only join in a faction if those parties did not run against each other in any German state during the election. Normally, all parties that surpassed the 5%-threshold build a faction of their own. The CDU and CSU however, have always formed a joint faction, called CDU/CSU or Union. This is possible, as the CSU only runs in the state of Bavaria and the CDU only runs in the other 15 states. The size of a faction determines the extent of its representation on committees, the time slots allotted for speaking, the number of committee chairs it can hold, and its representation in executive bodies of the Bundestag. The factions, not the members, receive the bulk of government funding for legislative and administrative activities.

The leadership of each Fraktion consists of a parliamentary party leader, several deputy leaders, and an executive committee. The leadership's major responsibilities are to represent the Fraktion, enforce party discipline and orchestrate the party's parliamentary activities. The members of each Fraktion are distributed among working groups focused on specific policy-related topics such as social policy, economics, and foreign policy. The Fraktion meets every Tuesday afternoon in the weeks in which the Bundestag is in session to consider legislation before the Bundestag and formulate the party's position on it.

Parties that do not hold 5% of the Bundestag-seats may be granted the status of a group in the Bundestag; this is decided case by case, as the rules of procedure do not state a fixed number of seats for this. This status entails some privileges which are in general less than those of a faction.

=== Committees ===
Most of the legislative work in the Bundestag is the product of standing committees, which exist largely unchanged throughout one legislative period. The number of committees approximates the number of federal ministries, and the titles of each are roughly similar (e.g., defense, agriculture, and labor). There are, as of the current nineteenth Bundestag, 24 standing committees. The distribution of committee chairs and the membership of each committee reflect the relative strength of the various Parliamentary groups in the chamber. In the current nineteenth Bundestag, the CDU/CSU chaired ten committees, the SPD five, the AfD and the FDP three each, The Left and the Greens two each. Members of the opposition party can chair a significant number of standing committees (e.g. the Budget Committee of the Bundestag was by tradition chaired by the biggest opposition party, until the 21st Bundestag, when Alternative for Germany was denied this post). These committees have either a small staff or no staff at all.

=== Administration ===
The members of Bundestag and the presidium are supported by the Bundestag Administration. It is headed by the Director, that reports to the President of the Bundestag. The Bundestag Administrations five departments are Parliament Service (Parlament und Abgeordnete), Research and External-Affairs (Wissenschaft und Aussenbeziehungen), Information & Documentation (Information und Dokumentation) which is responsible for the content on bundestag.de and Parlamentsfernsehen (Parliament-TV), Technics and Central Affairs (Zentralabteilung). The Central Affairs departement handels human resources and the legal department. The Parliamnet police also fall under this department. The Bundestag Administration employs around 3,000 employees.

=== Lobby Register ===
In 2021, the Bundestag established a statutory lobby register (Lobby Register Act). It lists all lobbyists and lobbying organizations registered with the Bundestag that are present within the Bundestag and exert influence on parliamentarians. Prior to this, a "Public List of the Registration of Associations and Their Representatives" had been in existence since 1972.

As of October 2026, approximately 6,333 organizations and individuals were registered as active interest representatives in the official lobbying register of the German Bundestag.

== Location ==
Also following the tradition of German diets, the German Bundestag can legally convene on any location, domestic and foreign. The Reichstag plenary chamber is not determined by law as the location of the assembly, making it a facility of convenience. Bundestag's predecessor, the German Reichstag, convened in the Kroll Opera House in Berlin, after the Reichstag with its then wooden interior and walls burned down in the Reichstag fire.

After World War II, the Bundestag did not have own facilities to call home and had to convene in the Bundeshaus in Bonn together with the Bundesrat. 1953, the plenary chambers in the Bundeshaus had to be expanded and the Bundestag assembled in a radio building in Cologne. Until 1965, the Bundestag assembled in West Berlin for nine sessions. Seven sessions have been held in the Technische Universität Berlin and two sessions in Berlin's Congress Hall in Tiergarten. The assemblies met severe protest from the communist side, the last session even interrupted by Soviet aircraft in supersonic low-altitude flight. 1971, the four occupying powers agreed to not accept Bundestag assemblies in West Berlin anymore. The Bundestag assembled in the Old Waterworks Building in Bonn when the old plenary chamber had to get broken down, and in the new plenary chamber for only a few years after Germany's reunification.

The most distinctive assembly of the Bundestag outside its regular chambers was on 4 October 1990, the day after German reunification. The Bundestag assembled inside the Reichstag building in Berlin for the first time after 57 years, and remote from its then-regular home in Bonn. Soon after this most memorable assembly, the Bundestag decided to move from Bonn back to Berlin by a law which sets only the city of Berlin to be the home of the Bundestag, not the building.

== See also ==
- German governing coalition
- Parliamentwatch
