= Bundeshaus (Bonn) =

Former seat of the Bundestag in Bonn, Germany

Coordinates: 50°43′10″N 7°07′27″E

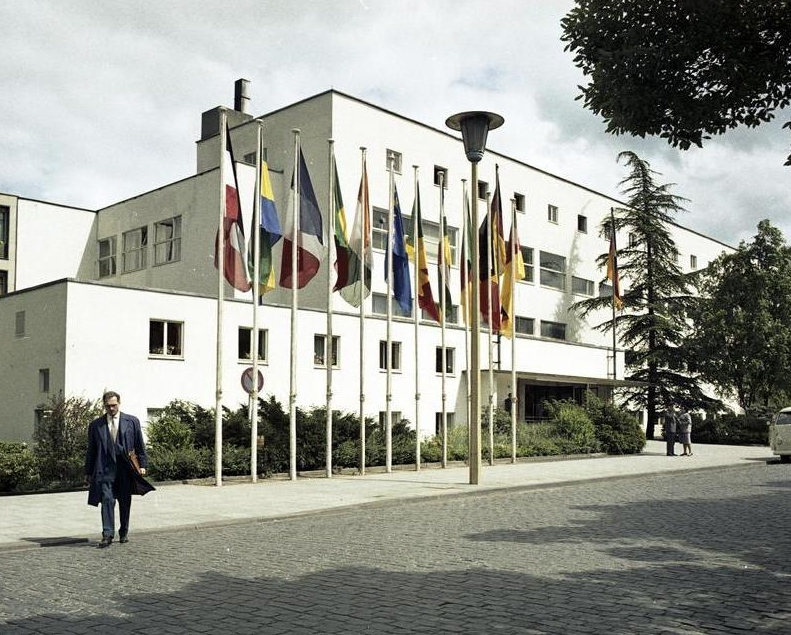
The Bundeshaus in 1961

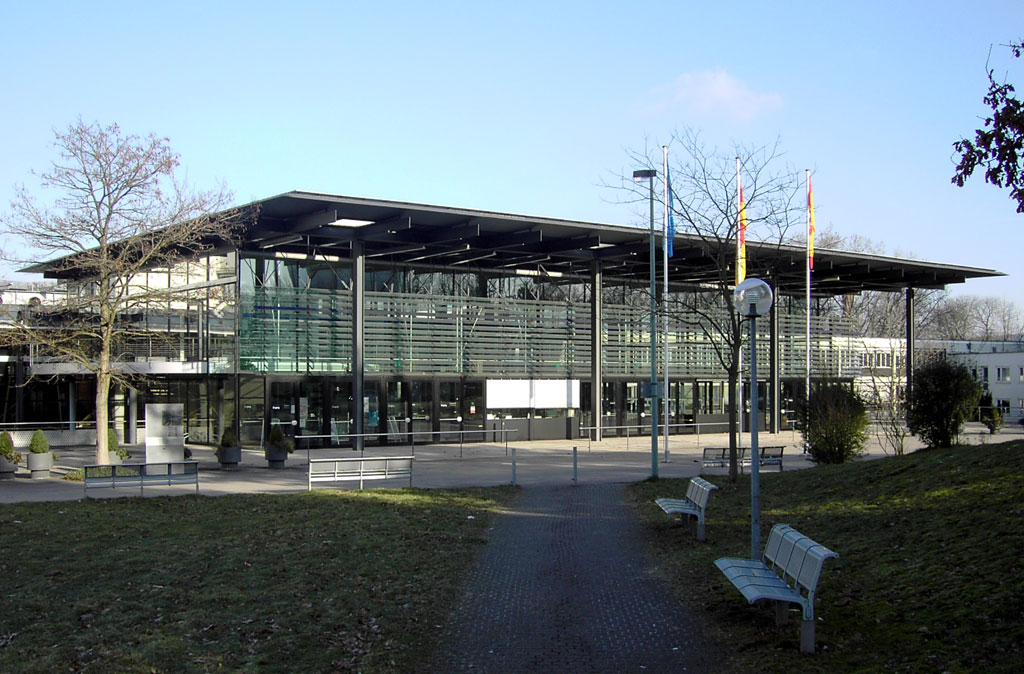
Plenary chamber of the German Bundestag in Bonn, architect Günter Behnisch

The Bundeshaus or Federal Parliament is a building complex in Bonn, Germany, which served as the seat of both the Bundestag and Bundesrat in West Germany from 1949 until 1999. The main building, constructed between 1930 and 1933, served as a pedagogical academy until the end of the Second World War. After the resolution of the Hauptstadtfrage (Capital Question) in 1949 in favor of Bonn, the structure was converted into the provisional seat of the Bundestag and Bundesrat.

For over forty years it served as the seat of both constitutional bodies. The Bundeshaus was expanded and renovated numerous times until these institutions were transferred to Berlin after the Hauptstadtbeschluss (Capital Resolution) in 1999, nine years after the German reunification.

The parliamentary chamber then became the "Internationale Kongresszentrum Bundeshaus Bonn", now known as the "World Conference Center Bonn", in which national and international conferences take place. The southern part of the building is to become the headquarters of the Climate Secretariat of the United Nations as part of the "UN-Campus", including the former Abgeordnetenhochhaus and the office block known as "Langer Eugen" (Tall Eugene, nickname of Eugen Gerstenmaier, former President of the Bundestag).

The Haus der Geschichte provides an opportunity to book tours and to visit the former Bundesrat.
