= Parliamentwatch =

German Internet portal

Parliamentwatch (abgeordnetenwatch.de) is a German Internet portal that allows asking questions to representatives and candidates in various parliaments publicly. The independent, nonpartisan site aims to increase transparency in government and deepen German democracy. Questions and answers are published, as well as the voting records of the deputies.

It is a non-profit project of Parlamentwatch e.V. and Parlamentwatch GmbH (technical service provider for Parlamentwatch e.V.) in cooperation with Mehr Demokratie e.V. and Mehr Bürgerrechte e.V. and is supported by BonVenture - Fonds und Stiftung für Soziale Verantwortung. The goal is to be financed through fund-raising groups and online advertisements that can be hidden on demand. Additional income comes from selling enhanced profiles to deputies and candidates.

== Moderation ==
All questions are read by a team of moderators to make sure they are within the moderation code, which prohibits insulting statements, incitement, discrimination, questions concerning private life, and requests that are bound to discretion.

Questions that violate the code are not activated and published, but the politician is informed about the incident. Beyond that, the project is strongly committed to neutrality and stays above party politics. In addition to general information about deputies, their voting behavior in issues that attract special public attention is documented.

== Statistics ==
On average, the website counts 6,800 visitors a day and about three million page impressions per month. More than 80% of all MPs of the federal parliament answer questions through Parliament Watch. In Germany, the project covers the federal parliament, the European parliament, nine state parliaments and 54 parliaments on the communal level. All in all the digital voters' memory counts 143,507 questions and 115,921 answers (as of 31 January 2013).

== Awards ==
- 2010: Fairness Initiative Award
- 2011: German Civic Engagement Award
- 2012: Wolfgang-Heilmann-Preis
- 2013: Democracy Award by the National Democratic Institute

== Landesparlamente ==
Due to abgeordnetenwatch's success in the German Bundestag, fundraising groups were established in August 2007 in order to make the site available for Germany's 16 Landesparlamente ("states"). Donations and supporting members in each state enable the implementation of the project on the state level; each state's portal is activated once 90 days' advance financing is accrued.

=== Hamburgische Bürgerschaft ===
abgeordnetenwatch.de is based in Hamburg; the project started in December 2004 for the Hamburgische Bürgerschaft ("Hamburg Parliament") after a successful referendum to reform and democratize the electoral system. The online dialog on abgeordnetenwatch.de enabled the citizens to get to know their politicians better and make a more qualified decision in the elections. After the election, the site made it possible to ask questions to members of Hamburg's Bezirksversammlungen ("Diets of the borough").

After the establishment of the city parliament that was elected in February 2008, the project was temporarily suspended until enough funding was provided. It was no longer possible to administer abgeordnetenwatch.de on a volunteer basis.

=== Controversy ===
During the 2007 election campaigns in the German states of Rheinland-Pfalz, Baden-Württemberg, Saxony-Anhalt, Mecklenburg-Vorpommern, Berlin, and Bremen, it was also possible to question the candidates.

In Bremen, candidates of the Social Democratic Party (Sozialdemokratische Partei Deutschlands, SPD) and The Left (Die Linke) launched a boycott against the project because right-wing candidates had not been excluded. However, the boycott was disrupted by Social Democrat Helga Ziegert, and Joachim Weihrauch from The Left enhanced his Parliamentwatch profile during the election.

== Profile enhancements ==
The site publishes basic information about each candidate at no cost. For a €179 fee, candidates can add a photo and web link, announce specific dates and events regarding election campaigns, and publish a résumé of their political work and goals. The proceeds from profile enhancements contribute to the project's budget.

== Other countries ==
So far, further Parliament Watch projects can be found in Ireland, Austria, Luxembourg and Tunisia. In addition, Parliament Watch inspires similar projects in other countries, e.g., Malaysia.
