= Hermann Ehlers =

German politician (1904–1954)

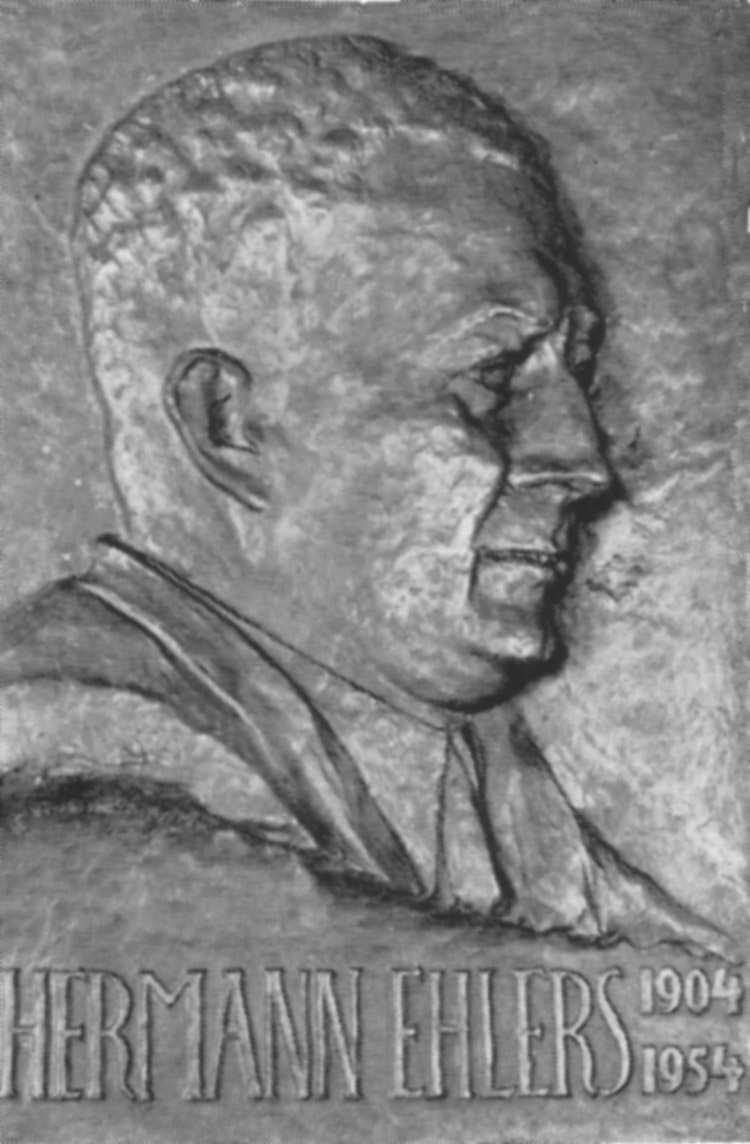

President of the Bundestag
- In office 19 October 1950 – 29 October 1954
- Preceded by: Erich Köhler
- Succeeded by: Eugen Gerstenmaier

Member of the Bundestag; from Lower Saxony
- In office 7 September 1949 – 29 October 1954
- Preceded by: Constituency established
- Succeeded by: Wilhelm Lotze
- Constituency: State list (1949–1953); Delmenhorst – Wesermarsch (1953–1954)

Personal details
- Born: Hermann Ludwig Ehlers; 1 October 1904 Berlin, Germany
- Died: 29 October 1954 (aged 50) Oldenburg, West Germany
- Party: Christian Democratic Union
- Spouse: Jutta Taubert (m. 1947)
- Education: FWU Berlin

Hermann Ehlers (1 October 1904 – 29 October 1954) was a German politician. He was the second president of the Bundestag from 19 October 1950 to 29 October 1954.

He was a member of the Christian Democratic Union.

== Early life ==
Ehlers was born in Berlin on 1 October 1904 to Hermann Heinrich Ludwig Ehlers and Adelheid Louise Auguste (Rabe) Ehlers. His parents moved to Berlin from Sülze shortly before Hermann's birth due to the opening of a job with the post office for the elder Ehlers. Hermann was raised in a bourgeoisie, politically conservative and evangelical environment.

== University and Early Political Involvement ==
After graduating from vocational school in Steglitz in 1922, Ehlers began studying law at the Humboldt University of Berlin. Ehlers' time at college was surely influenced by the revolutions, inflation, unemployment, and political radicalization that characterized Germany following World War I, and Ehler became exceedingly active in student political groups such as the "Verband der Vereine Deutscher Studenten" (United German Student Union).

Ehlers began studying at the University of Bonn in the summer of 1924, where he began attending the lectures of the famous but controversial professor of constitutional law, Carl Schmitt. Schmitt, a pioneer in the realm of authoritarian politics, ultimately inspired Ehlers to write his dissertation on the "Essence and Effects of an Imperial Prussian State." Ehlers was also heavily influenced by the early national-socialist Arthur Moeller van den Bruck during this time, and began to sympathize with the German National People's Party, a precursor to the National Socialist German Worker's Party of the 1930s.

== Nazi-Era ==
Although initially enthusiastic about the sense of national awakening that occurred in the wake of the appointment of Adolf Hitler as chancellor, Ehlers was ultimately turned away from the Nazi movement by his Christian beliefs and activity within the church. After passing the state bar exam and receiving the title of "Gerichtsassessor" in July 1931, Ehlers began working in the administration service of the Evangelischen Kirche der Altpreußischen Union (Evangelical Church of the Prussian Union). He continued to work in various offices for the church throughout the 1930s.

In 1937, Ehlers along with three other members of the Confessing Church were arrested by the Gestapo on charges of "disobedience to the state." These charges stemmed from a decision made by the Confession Church to act against the will of the Reich and publish the names of those who had succeeded from the church for political gain. Since Ehlers was not present at the meeting in which the church decided to publish these names, he was released from prison after only fourteen days. His arrest reflects the fine line he and his fellow church members were walking in relation to the Nazi government. Throughout the remainder of the Nazi-Era Ehlers would continue to identify Hitler's regime as the primary opponent of the church, and viewed the ongoing battle as a necessary one: "We no longer oppose an illegitimate church government, but rather the state. We must go the way of disobedience. This will certainly mean an exasperating fight."

Ehlers was drafted into the military on 23 October 1940, and assigned to anti-aircraft warfare in Hamburg. He became a candidate for the title of officer on 20 February 1942 and was promoted to lieutenant a year later. Throughout his time in the military he continued to commit himself to the council of the Confessing Church.

== Post-War ==
Ehlers decided in August 1946 on the basis of his Christian beliefs to begin working with the CDU, and began his political career as a councilman in Oldenburg. He was elected to the German Bundestag in 1949, and his election as President of the Bundestag in 1950 served as a symbol of the party's commitment to remaining interconfessional.

Ehlers died from septic tonsillitis on 29 October 1954 in an Oldenburg hospital.

== Family life and legacy ==
Ehlers was married to Jutta Taubert, who died in Switzerland in 2002. Multiple schools and dormitories within Germany carry his name, and the Hermann Ehlers Stiftung continues to operate as a think tank for the CDU to this day. The Evangelical Task Force of the CDU/CSU has awarded the Hermann Ehlers Medal to church and political personalities for their service to evangelicalism since 2004.
