= Eugen Gerstenmaier =

German politician (1906–1986)

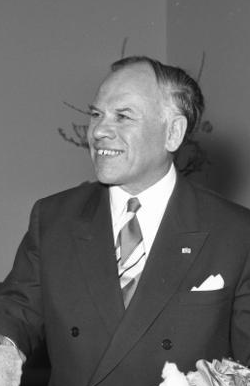
- Gerstenmaier 1960

President of the Bundestag
- In office 16 November 1954 – 31 January 1969
- Preceded by: Hermann Ehlers
- Succeeded by: Kai-Uwe von Hassel

Member of the Bundestag
- In office 7 September 1949 – 19 October 1969
- Preceded by: Constituency established
- Succeeded by: Dieter Schulte
- Constituency: Backnang (1949–1965); Schwäbisch Gmünd – Backnang (1965–1969)

Personal details
- Born: 25 August 1906 Kirchheim unter Teck, German Empire
- Died: 13 March 1986 (aged 79) Oberwinter, West Germany
- Party: Christian Democratic Union
- Children: 3
- Education: University of Tübingen; University of Zurich; University of Rostock

Eugen Karl Albrecht Gerstenmaier (25 August 1906 – 13 March 1986) was a German Protestant theologian, resistance fighter in the Third Reich, and a CDU politician. From 1954 to 1969, he served as the third president of the Bundestag. With a tenure of over 14 years, he is, as of January 2026, the longest serving presiding officer of the German parliament and also the only person to preside over the Bundestag during four legislative periods (the 2nd, 3rd, 4th, and 5th Bundestag).

== Life, career, resistance ==
Gerstenmaier was born in Kirchheim unter Teck. After training as a salesman, Gerstenmaier did his Abitur and then studied philosophy, German language and literature, and Protestant theology in Tübingen, Rostock and Zurich. In 1934, he was detained for a short time for being a member of the Confessing Church. In 1935, he became Theodor Heckel's assistant in the German Evangelical Church's office for outside affairs. After the Munich Conference in 1938, Gerstenmaier joined the resistance group about the Kreisau Circle.

On 20 July 1944, the day of Claus Schenk von Stauffenberg's attempt on Adolf Hitler's life at the Wolf's Lair in East Prussia, Gerstenmaier was at his assigned place at the Bendlerblock in Berlin to support the attempted assassination and coup d'état against the Nazi régime. Along with many others, he was arrested after the plot failed, and on 11 January 1945, Gerstenmaier was sentenced by the Volksgerichtshof to seven years in labour prison (Zuchthaus). This by the standards of "hanging judge" Roland Freisler unusually lenient sentence (the prosecution had demanded death by hanging) may partially be explained by Gerstenmaier's playing the "unworldly theologian" role to the hilt, partially by intercession on his behalf with Freisler by acting national press chief Helmut Sündermann. He spent only a few months there as he was freed by US troops at the end of the war. Along with Hermann Ehlers, a German politician, he was active in the Evangelical Aid organization (Evangelisches Hilfswerk); from 1945 to 1951, he was its leader.

== In the Bundestag ==
From 1949 to 1969, Gerstenmaier was a member of the Bundestag for the CDU. From 1949 to 1953, he was the Acting Chairman of the Foreign Board at the Bundestag, and eventually, until 17 December 1954, the chairman.

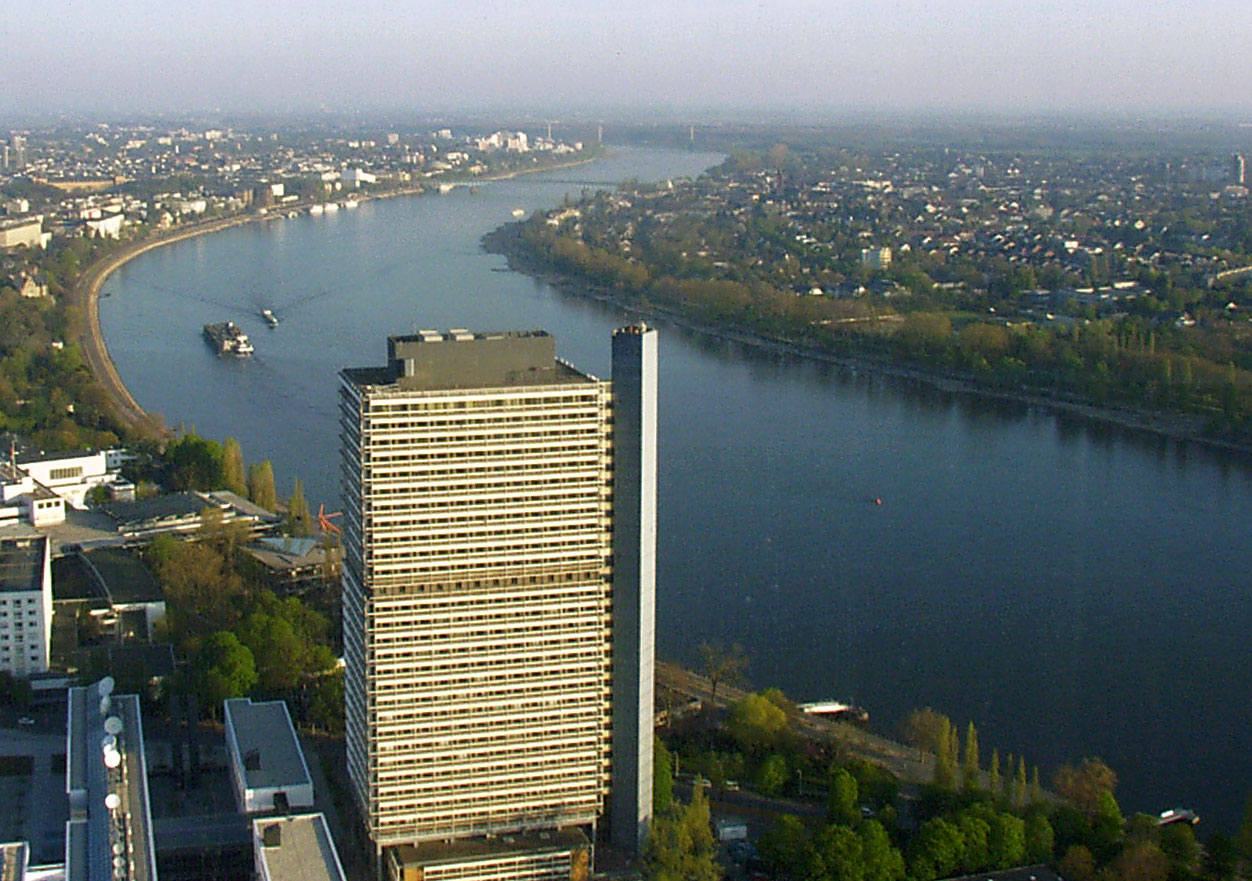
"Langer Eugen" in Bonn, the former (until 1999) Bundestag members' office building

After Hermann Ehlers's sudden death in 1954, Gerstenmaier became his successor (until 1969) as Bundestag President. With his election on 16 November 1954 arose a unique situation with two factional colleagues running against each other for the Bundestag Presidency. Against the "official" CDU/CSU candidate Gerstenmaier, whom many members, and the governing coalition, saw as being too close to the Church, stood Ernst Lemmer, put forward by FDP member Hans Reif, who lost only on the third ballot by a mere 14 votes. From 1957 until 12 October 1959, Gerstenmaier was Chairman of the Subcommission for managing the Bundestag "household".

On 31 January 1969, Gerstenmaier resigned his post as Bundestag President after public controversy about claims of certain compensation benefits, to which he was legally entitled. However, the sheer amount of these claims was considered scandalous, and the suspicion that political influence was at work could not be allayed. His successor was Kai-Uwe von Hassel.

Gerstenmeier died in Bonn. The 29-floor highrise in Bonn, in whose building Gerstenmaier had played such a significant rôle, and in which each member of the Bundestag had an office, is nicknamed "Langer Eugen" ("Long Eugen") after Eugen Gerstenmaier. It has, however, been described as "Bonn's ugliest building". Since June 2006 it is seat of United Nations Organizations.

== Political leanings ==
Eugen Gerstenmaier belonged to a CDU faction who internally criticized Konrad Adenauer's policy of engaging the West because that brought along with it a tendency to turn away from the goal of reuniting Germany. Even in social policy, Gerstenmaier was rather critical of Adenauer and supported Ludwig Erhard's position instead, with pointedly Christian-Protestant arguments against the "total welfare state". From 1956 to 1966, he was acting CDU Federal Chairman.

Gerstenmaier belonged to the select committee of both "Union" parties (the CDU and CSU) which on 24 February 1959 put forward Ludwig Erhard as a candidate for Federal President (Bundespräsident), although Erhard declined the honour.

== Honours ==
In 1980, Gerstenmaier was the CDU's delegate alongside Hermann Kunst (chairman), Alex Möller (for the SPD), Rudolf Hanauer (for the CSU) and Bernhard Leverenz (for the FDP) on the Arbitration Committee for Overseeing Compliance with the Election Campaigning Agreement in the Bundestag election campaign.

From 1977 until his death, Gerstenmaier was Chairman of the Association of Former Members of the German Bundestag (or as of 1984, the Association of Former Members of the German Bundestag and the European Parliament).

In 1957, Gerstenmaier received the Grand Decoration of Honour in Gold with Sash for Services to the Republic of Austria.

== Publications ==
- Kirche, Volk und Staat: Stimmen aus der Deutschen Evangelischen Kirche zur Oxforder Weltkirchenkonferenz (as editor) Berlin: Furche-verlag 1937
- Der dritte Bundestag. Zum Wahlgesetz und zur Gestalt des künftigen Parlaments, in: Der Wähler, Jg. 1955, Heft 11, Seiten 495–497
- Brauchen wir einen besseren Bundestag?, in: DER SPIEGEL, Jg. 1964, Heft 38 vom 16. September 1964
- Öffentliche Meinung und Parlamentarische Entscheidung, in: Karl Dietrich Bracher u.a., Die moderne Demokratie und ihr Recht. Festschrift für Gerhard Leibholz zum 65. Geburtstag, Tübingen 1966, Seiten 123–134
- Zukunftserwartungen der Demokratie, in: Bitburger Gespräche, Jahrbuch 1972–73, Trier 1974, Seiten 41–50
- Gewissensentscheidung im Parlament, in: Deutsches Ärzteblatt, Jg. 1980, Heft 30, Seiten 1855–1858
- Streit und Friede hat seine Zeit. Ein Lebensbericht, Frankfurt am Main 1981

== Literature ==
- Bruno Heck (ed.): Widerstand - Kirche - Staat. Eugen Gerstenmaier zum 70. Geburtstag. Stuttgart 1976
- Daniela Gniss: Der Politiker Eugen Gerstenmaier 1906-1986, Düsseldorf 2005
- Michael F. Feldkamp (ed.): Der Bundestagspräsident. Amt - Funktion - Person. 16. Wahlperiode, München 2007, ISBN 978-3-7892-8201-0
