= Erich Köhler =

German politician (1892–1958)

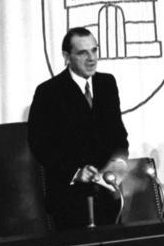
- Köhler in 1949

President of the Bundestag
- In office 7 September 1949 – 18 October 1950
- Preceded by: Office established
- Succeeded by: Hermann Ehlers

Member of the Bundestag; from Hesse
- In office 7 September 1949 – 16 October 1957
- Preceded by: Constituency established
- Succeeded by: Berthold Martin
- Constituency: State list (1949–1953); Obertaunuskreis (1953–1957)

Member of the Landtag of Hesse
- In office 26 February 1946 – 1 June 1947
- Preceded by: Constituency established
- Succeeded by: Richard Graf Matuschka-Greiffenclau
- Constituency: State list (1946); Wahlkreis XIII (1946–1947)

Personal details
- Born: 27 June 1892 Erfurt, Germany
- Died: 23 October 1958 (aged 66) Wiesbaden, West Germany
- Party: Christian Democratic Union
- Other political affiliations: DVP (before 1933)
- Education: Marburg University; HU Berlin; Leipzig University; Kiel University

Erich Köhler (27 June 1892 – 23 October 1958) was a German politician. He was the first president of the Bundestag from 7 September 1949 to 18 October 1950.

Köhler co-founded the Christian Democratic Union of Germany in 1945. He was elected as a member of the first German Bundestag for Hesse in 1949.
