= President of the Bundestag =

Presiding officer of the German federal parliament

- Präsidentin des Deutschen Bundestages
- Seal of the Bundestag

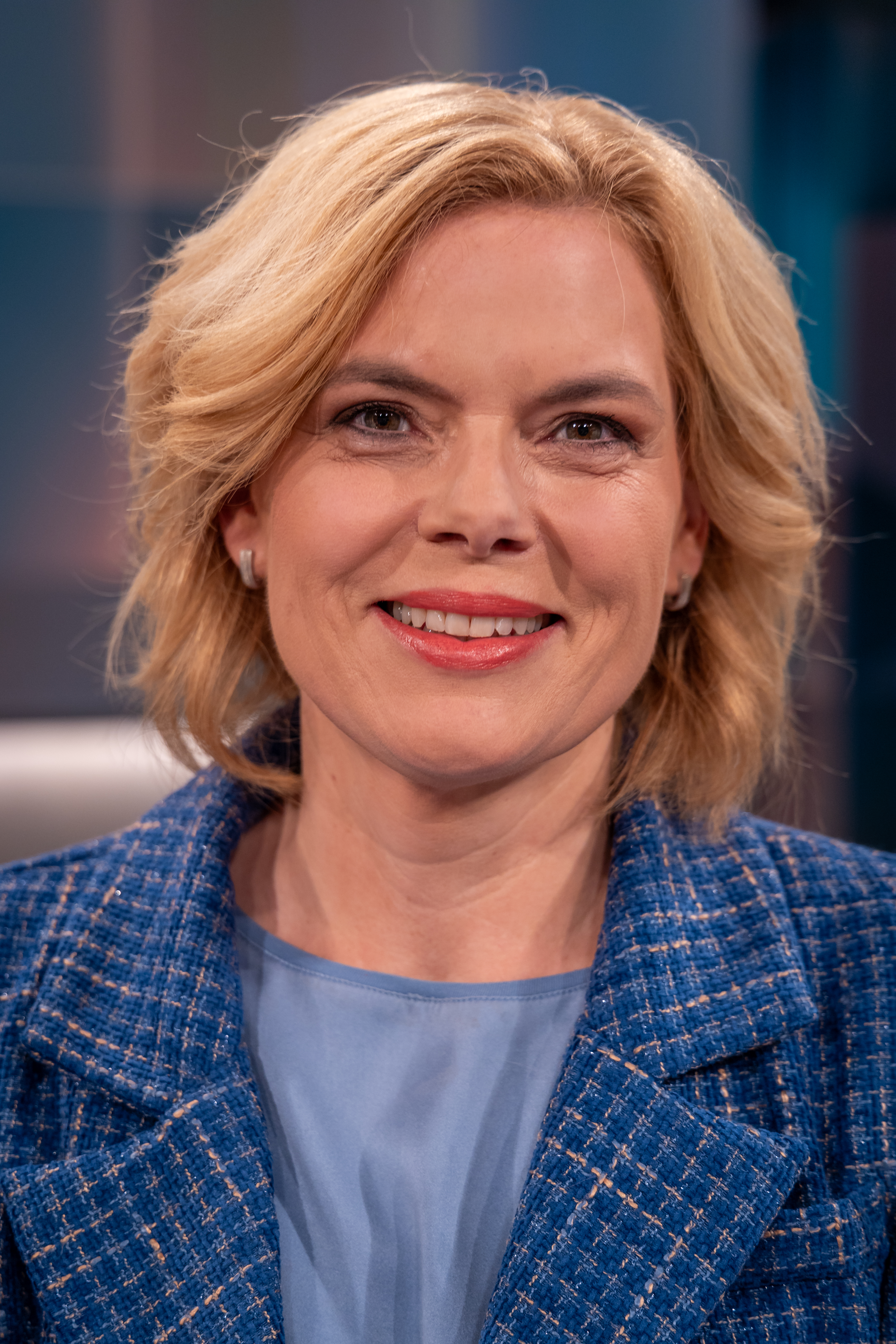
- Incumbent; Julia Klöckner since 25 March 2025
- Presidium of the Bundestag
- Style: Ms. President (when addressed in the Bundestag)
- Type: Presiding officer
- Seat: Reichstag building, Berlin
- Nominator: Political parties
- Appointer: Bundestag; traditionally appointing nominee of the largest party
- Term length: Contemporaneous to legislative period
- Constituting instrument: German Basic Law
- Precursor: President of the Reichstag
- Formation: 7 September 1949
- First holder: Erich Köhler
- Deputy: Vice Presidents of the Bundestag
- Website: www.bundestag.de

The president of the Bundestag (German: Präsidentin des Deutschen Bundestages or Bundestagspräsidentin; Präsident when the office is held by a man) presides over the sessions of the Bundestag, the federal parliament of Germany, with functions similar to that of a speaker in other countries. In the German order of precedence, the office is ranked second after the president and before the chancellor.

The current office-holder is Julia Klöckner (CDU), who was elected during the first session of the 21st Bundestag on 25 March 2025.

== Election and customs ==
The president of the Bundestag is elected during the constituent session of each election period after the federal elections or in a later session, if the office has fallen vacant, by all members of the Bundestag. The president has to be a member of the Bundestag. Until the election of the president, the session is chaired by the father of the House, the so-called Alterspräsident. Since 2017, this has been the longest serving member of the Bundestag; in 1949–2017, it was the oldest member of the Bundestag by age.

Usually, the president of the Bundestag is a member of the largest parliamentary group. This constitutional convention had emerged already in times of the Weimar Republic, but this is not required by law. The term ends with the election period, and there is no provision for an early removal. The term of the president can only end prematurely if they resign the position, leave the Bundestag or die. They can be re-elected in the next election period provided they become a member of the Bundestag again.

Traditionally, the president of the Bundestag is proposed by the largest group, and elected uncontested. The only exception so far has been in 1954 after the unexpected death of Hermann Ehlers (CDU). Nominated by Hans Reif (Free Democratic Party (FDP)), Ernst Lemmer (CDU) stood against the "official" CDU/CSU candidate, Eugen Gerstenmaier, and lost after three ballots with a difference of 14 votes (204 for Gerstenmaier, 190 for Lemmer, 15 abstentions).

== Presidium of the Bundestag ==
The president of the Bundestag has several deputies, the vice presidents of the Bundestag (Vizepräsident des Deutschen Bundestages or Bundestagsvizepräsident), who are supplied by the other parliamentary groups. The number of vice presidents was not fixed in the Bundestag's Geschäftsordnung (rules of order) since 1949, when two were elected, representing opposition and minor party FDP. As the reigning Union of CDU/CSU comprises two independent but complementary parties, CDU in all states but Bavaria, CSU only in Bavaria, the CSU got a deputy in 1953. Since 1961, the other large party, the SPD, also got a second deputy. When the Green party joined in 1983, the number was not increased, and their candidates were not elected. The same occurred for the successor to the former Socialist Unity Party of Germany, the Party of Democratic Socialism (PDS) after reunification in 1990.

In 1994, things changed when it was decided that each parliamentary group should be represented by at least one vice president. Since then, the Greens and the PDS/Linke have also had deputies.

However, when the new AfD first entered the parliament in 2017, none of their six candidates for vice president were elected, nor were any of their over 30 candidates in the 20th Bundestag since 2021. There is some controversy over this cordon sanitaire imposed against the far-right AfD, but the Federal Constitutional Court of Germany has ruled that even though the rules of order of the Bundestag give the AfD the right to a Vice-Presidential post, there is no obligation for any given member of the Bundestag to vote for any given candidate for Vice-President of the Bundestag and the office requires election by a majority vote of the Bundestag. Together, the president and the vice presidents make up the Presidium of the Bundestag.

In the former 20th Bundestag, the vice presidents were:

- Aydan Özoğuz (SPD)
- Yvonne Magwas (CDU/CSU)
- Katrin Göring-Eckardt (Bündnis 90/Die Grünen)
- Wolfgang Kubicki (FDP)
- Petra Pau (Die Linke)

== Legal background ==
The legal foundation for the office is Article 40 of the Basic Law which states that the Bundestag elects a president and vice presidents and is to give itself rules of order. Due to a 1952 Federal Constitutional Court decision, the Geschäftsordnung has to be enacted afresh in every election period, but usually the old rules are reenacted without change. The Geschäftsordnung specifies the duties of the president of the Bundestag and the vice presidents as well as their number.

== Duties ==
The president's most important duty is to chair the sessions of the Bundestag. The president determines the order of speakers and opens and closes the debates, and ensures that debates take place in an orderly fashion. In the case of grave disruption, they may exclude a member of parliament for up to 30 session days. All draft legislation initiated by the Federal Government, the Bundestag or the Bundesrat is addressed to the president, as well as all submissions and petitions from within or addressed to the Bundestag. The president of the Bundestag also chairs the Council of Elders, which manages the internal affairs of the Bundestag. For the election of a new Federal president, the president of the Bundestag convenes and chairs the Bundesversammlung.

Additionally, the president receives the statements of account of the political parties, monitors party financing and regulates campaign cost reimbursement. The president also has police power over the premises of the parliament and oversees its police force, can veto any search and seizure there to protect the independence of the parliament, and acts as the employer of the Bundestag's public servants.

== List of presidents ==
Political parties CDU SPD

Portrait	Name (Born–Died)	Term of office (Note: Presidents of the Bundestag regularly leave office at the end of each legislative session, meaning that the office is vacant at the beginning of a session. Even if they are then re-elected, there is technically no continuous term of office, but always a short interruption of a few hours at the beginning of each session. For the sake of simplicity, this is not shown in the following table.)			Faction	Legislative sessions
Portrait	Name (Born–Died)	Took office	Left office	Days	Faction	Legislative sessions
1	Erich Köhler (1892–1958) (aged 66)	7 September 1949	18 October 1950	1 year, 41 days	CDU/CSU	1st
2	Hermann Ehlers (1904–1954) (aged 50)	19 October 1950	29 October 1954	4 years, 10 days	CDU/CSU	1st, 2nd
3	Eugen Gerstenmaier (1906–1986) (aged 79)	16 November 1954	31 January 1969	14 years, 76 days	CDU/CSU	2nd, 3rd, 4th, 5th
4	Kai-Uwe von Hassel (1913–1997) (aged 84)	5 February 1969	13 December 1972	3 years, 312 days	CDU/CSU	6th
5	Annemarie Renger (1919–2008) (aged 88)	13 December 1972	14 December 1976	4 years, 1 day	SPD	7th
6	Karl Carstens (1914–1992) (aged 77)	14 December 1976	31 May 1979	2 years, 168 days	CDU/CSU	8th
7	Richard Stücklen (1916–2002) (aged 85)	31 May 1979	29 March 1983	3 years, 302 days	CDU/CSU	8th, 9th
8	Rainer Barzel (1924–2006) (aged 82)	29 March 1983	25 October 1984	1 year, 210 days	CDU/CSU	10th
9	Philipp Jenninger (1932–2018) (aged 85)	5 November 1984	11 November 1988	4 years, 6 days	CDU/CSU	10th, 11th
10	Rita Süssmuth (1937–2026) (aged 88)	25 November 1988	26 October 1998	9 years, 335 days	CDU/CSU	11th, 12th, 13th
11	Wolfgang Thierse (born 1943)	26 October 1998	18 October 2005	6 years, 357 days	SPD	14th, 15th
12	Norbert Lammert (born 1948)	18 October 2005	24 October 2017	12 years, 6 days	CDU/CSU	16th, 17th, 18th
13	Wolfgang Schäuble (1942–2023) (aged 81)	24 October 2017	26 October 2021	4 years, 2 days	CDU/CSU	19th
14	Bärbel Bas (born 1968)	26 October 2021	25 March 2025	3 years, 150 days	SPD	20th
15	Julia Klöckner (born 1972)	25 March 2025	Incumbent	1 year, 217 days	CDU/CSU	21st

== Books ==
Michael F. Feldkamp (ed.), Der Bundestagspräsident. Amt - Funktion - Person. 16. Wahlperiode, München 2007, ISBN 978-3-7892-8201-0
