= List of members of the 1st Bundestag =

1st Bundestag
2nd	→

Overview
- Legislative body: Bundestag
- Jurisdiction: Germany
- Meeting place: Bundeshaus, Bonn
- Term: 7 September 1949 – 7 September 1953
- Election: 14 August 1949
- Government: First Adenauer cabinet
- Members: 402
- President: Erich Köhler (CDU/CSU; Hermann Ehlers (CDU/CSU)

This is a list of members of the First German Bundestag – the lower house of parliament of the Federal Republic of Germany, whose members were in office from 1949 until 1953.

They were elected in the 1949 West German federal election.

== Members ==
State	No.	Constituency	Member	Party
Schleswig-Holstein	1	Husum – Südtondern – Eiderstedt	Christian Giencke	CDU
Schleswig-Holstein	2	Flensburg	Eduard Edert	Independent
Schleswig-Holstein	3	Schleswig – Eckernförde	Johannes Hagge	CDU
Schleswig-Holstein	4	Norder- und Süderdithmarschen	Hermann Glüsing	CDU
Schleswig-Holstein	5	Rendsburg	Detlef Struve	CDU
Schleswig-Holstein	6	Kiel	Walter Brookmann	CDU
Schleswig-Holstein	7	Plön – Eutin/Nord	Heinrich Gerns	CDU
Schleswig-Holstein	8	Oldenburg – Eutin/Süd	Paul Stech	SPD
Schleswig-Holstein	9	Lübeck	Paul Bromme	SPD
Schleswig-Holstein	10	Segeberg – Neumünster	Carl Schröter (Note: Carl Schröter died on 25 February 1952.)	CDU
Schleswig-Holstein	10	Segeberg – Neumünster	Walter Bartram (Note: Walter Bartram was by-elected on 4 May 1952, to succeed Carl Schröter. He took office on 13 May 1952.)	CDU
Schleswig-Holstein	11	Steinburg	Willi Steinhörster	SPD
Schleswig-Holstein	12	Pinneberg	Anni Krahnstöver	SPD
Schleswig-Holstein	13	Stormarn	Hans Ekstrand	SPD
Schleswig-Holstein	14	Herzogtum Lauenburg	Wilhelm Gülich	SPD
Schleswig-Holstein	List		Hans Ewers	DP
Schleswig-Holstein	List		Wolfgang Hedler	DP
Schleswig-Holstein	List		Otto Wittenburg	DP
Schleswig-Holstein	List		Fritz Baade	SPD
Schleswig-Holstein	List		Kurt Pohle	SPD
Schleswig-Holstein	List		Fritz Oellers (Note: Fritz Oellers resigned on 5 June 1951.)	FDP
Schleswig-Holstein	List		Hans Revenstorff	FDP
Schleswig-Holstein	List		Curt Hoffmann (Note: Curt Hoffmann took office on 15 June 1951, to succeed Fritz Oellers.)	FDP
Schleswig-Holstein	List		Linus Kather	CDU
Schleswig-Holstein	List		Hermann Clausen	SSW
Hamburg	1	Hamburg I	Peter Blachstein	SPD
Hamburg	2	Hamburg IV	Margarete Gröwel	CDU
Hamburg	3	Hamburg III	Gerd Bucerius	CDU
Hamburg	4	Hamburg VI	Karl Meitmann	SPD
Hamburg	5	Hamburg V	Irma Keilhack	SPD
Hamburg	6	Hamburg VIII	Willy Max Rademacher	FDP
Hamburg	7	Hamburg II	Hugo Scharnberg	CDU
Hamburg	8	Hamburg VII	Herbert Wehner	SPD
Hamburg	List		Hellmut Kalbitzer	SPD
Hamburg	List		Erich Klabunde (Note: Erich Klabunde died on 21 November 1950.)	SPD
Hamburg	List		Gertrud Lockmann (Note: Gertrud Lockmann took office on 28 November 1950, to succeed Erich Klabunde.)	SPD
Hamburg	List		Hermann Schäfer	FDP
Hamburg	List		Albert Walter	DP
Hamburg	List		Gustav Gundelach	KPD
Lower Saxony	1	Aurich – Emden	Georg Peters	SPD
Lower Saxony	2	Leer	Johann Temmen	SPD
Lower Saxony	3	Wilhelmshaven – Friesland	Johann Cramer	SPD
Lower Saxony	4	Emsland	Bernard Povel (Note: Bernard Povel died on 21 October 1952.)	CDU
Lower Saxony	5	Bersenbrück – Lingen	Heinrich Eckstein	CDU
Lower Saxony	6	Osnabrück	Anton Storch	CDU
Lower Saxony	7	Delmenhorst – Wesermarsch	Fritz Ohlig	SPD
Lower Saxony	8	Oldenburg – Ammerland	Robert Dannemann	FDP
Lower Saxony	9	Vechta – Cloppenburg	Georg Kühling	CDU
Lower Saxony	10	Cuxhaven – Hadeln – Wesermünde	Arthur Mertins	SPD
Lower Saxony	11	Stade – Bremervörde	Heinrich Hellwege	DP
Lower Saxony	12	Verden – Rotenburg – Osterholz	Hans-Joachim von Merkatz	DP
Lower Saxony	13	Lüneburg – Dannenberg	Friedrich Nowack	SPD
Lower Saxony	14	Harburg – Soltau	Wilhelm Bahlburg	DP
Lower Saxony	15	Fallingbostel – Hoya	Heinz Matthes	DP
Lower Saxony	16	Celle	Lisa Korspeter	SPD
Lower Saxony	17	Uelzen	Moritz-Ernst Priebe	SPD
Lower Saxony	18	Stadt Hannover-Nord	Bruno Leddin (Note: Bruno Leddin died on 25 March 1951.)	SPD
Lower Saxony	18	Stadt Hannover-Nord	Egon Franke (Note: Egon Franke was by-elected on 6 May 1951, to succeed Bruno Leddin. He took office on 17 May 1951.)	SPD
Lower Saxony	19	Stadt Hannover-Süd	Kurt Schumacher (Note: Kurt Schumacher died on 20 August 1952.)	SPD
Lower Saxony	19	Stadt Hannover-Süd	Ernst Winter (Note: Ernst Winter was by-elected on 9 November 1952, to succeed Kurt Schumacher.)	SPD
Lower Saxony	20	Hannover-Land	Hans Jahn	SPD
Lower Saxony	21	Neustadt – Grafschaft Schaumburg	Ernst Weltner	SPD
Lower Saxony	22	Nienburg – Schaumburg-Lippe	Otto Heinrich Greve	SPD
Lower Saxony	23	Diepholz – Melle – Wittlage	Rudolf Eickhoff	DP
Lower Saxony	24	Hameln – Springe	Herbert Kriedemann	SPD
Lower Saxony	25	Alfeld – Holzminden	Elinor Hubert	SPD
Lower Saxony	26	Hildesheim	Heinrich-Wilhelm Ruhnke	SPD
Lower Saxony	27	Gandersheim – Salzgitter	Karl Bielig	SPD
Lower Saxony	28	Stadt Braunschweig	Otto Arnholz	SPD
Lower Saxony	29	Braunschweig-Land – Helmstedt	Hermann Troppenz	SPD
Lower Saxony	30	Wolfenbüttel – Goslar-Land	Fritz Wenzel	SPD
Lower Saxony	31	Harz	Hermann Stopperich (Note: Hermann Stopperich died on 6 January 1952.)	SPD
Lower Saxony	31	Harz	Hans-Joachim Fricke (Note: Hans-Joachim Fricke was by-elected on 16 March 1952, to succeed Hermann Stopperich. He took office on 22 March 1952.)	DP
Lower Saxony	32	Peine – Gifhorn	Joachim Schöne	SPD
Lower Saxony	33	Northeim – Einbeck – Duderstadt	Martin Schmidt	SPD
Lower Saxony	34	Göttingen-Münden	Arno Hennig	SPD
Lower Saxony	List		Wilhelm Brese	CDU
Lower Saxony	List		Else Brökelschen	CDU
Lower Saxony	List		Hermann Ehlers	CDU
Lower Saxony	List		Ernst Kuntscher	CDU
Lower Saxony	List		Fritz Mensing	CDU
Lower Saxony	List		Wilhelm Naegel	CDU
Lower Saxony	List		Kurt Schmücker	CDU
Lower Saxony	List		Oskar Wackerzapp	CDU
Lower Saxony	List		Hermann A. Eplée (Note: Hermann A. Eplée took office on 16 January 1953, to succeed Bernard Povel.)	CDU
Lower Saxony	List		Carl von Campe (Note: Carl von Campe took office on 23 January 1950, to succeed Friedrich Klinge, but resigned on 8 January 1952.)	DP
Lower Saxony	List		Ernst Farke	DP
Lower Saxony	List		Margot Kalinke	DP
Lower Saxony	List		Friedrich Klinge (Note: Friedrich Klinge died on 21 December 1949.)	DP
Lower Saxony	List		Christian Kuhlemann	DP
Lower Saxony	List		Hans Mühlenfeld (Note: Hans Mühlenfeld resigned on 15 May 1953.)	DP
Lower Saxony	List		Hans-Christoph Seebohm	DP
Lower Saxony	List		Peter Tobaben	DP
Lower Saxony	List		Robert Jaffé (Note: Robert Jaffé took office on 9 January 1952, to succeed Carl von Campe.)	DP
Lower Saxony	List		Ernst Woltje (Note: Ernst Woltje took office on 30 May 1953, to succeed Hans Mühlenfeld.)	DP
Lower Saxony	List		Fritz Dorls (Note: Fritz Dorls was removed on 23 October 1952.)	DKP–DRP
Lower Saxony	List		Heinz Frommhold	DKP–DRP
Lower Saxony	List		Herwart Miessner	DKP–DRP
Lower Saxony	List		Fritz Rössler (Note: Fritz Rössler used the alias Franz Richter. He resigned on 21 February 1952.)	DKP–DRP
Lower Saxony	List		Adolf von Thadden	DKP–DRP
Lower Saxony	List		Elfriede Jaeger (Note: Elfriede Jaeger took office on 29 February 1952, to succeed Fritz Rössler.)	DKP–DRP
Lower Saxony	List		Walther Hasemann	FDP
Lower Saxony	List		Erich Langer	FDP
Lower Saxony	List		Alfred Onnen	FDP
Lower Saxony	List		Artur Stegner	FDP
Bremen	1	Bremen-Ost	Heinz Meyer	SPD
Bremen	2	Bremen-West	Siegfried Bärsch	SPD
Bremen	3	Bremerhaven – Bremen-Nord	Bernhard Lohmüller (Note: Bernhard Lohmüller died on 2 March 1952.)	SPD
Bremen	3	Bremerhaven – Bremen-Nord	Philipp Wehr (Note: Philipp Wehr was by-elected on 18 May 1952, to succeed Bernhard Lohmüller. He took office on 21 May 1952.)	SPD
Bremen	List		Adolf Ahrens	DP
Bremen	List		Johannes Degener (Note: Johannes Degener resigned on 31 December 1951.)	CDU
Bremen	List		Ernst Müller-Hermann (Note: Ernst Müller-Hermann took office on 1 January 1952, to succeed Johannes Degener.)	CDU
North Rhine-Westphalia	1	Aachen-Stadt	Helene Weber	CDU
North Rhine-Westphalia	2	Aachen-Land	Franz Mühlenberg	CDU
North Rhine-Westphalia	3	Geilenkirchen – Erkelenz – Jülich	Karl Müller	CDU
North Rhine-Westphalia	4	Düren – Monschau – Schleiden	Bernhard Günther	CDU
North Rhine-Westphalia	5	Bergheim – Euskirchen	Johannes Even	CDU
North Rhine-Westphalia	6	Köln-Land	Aloys Lenz	CDU
North Rhine-Westphalia	7	Cologne II	Hermann Pünder	CDU
North Rhine-Westphalia	8	Cologne I	Aenne Brauksiepe	CDU
North Rhine-Westphalia	9	Cologne III	Johannes Albers	CDU
North Rhine-Westphalia	10	Bonn-Stadt und -Land	Konrad Adenauer	CDU
North Rhine-Westphalia	11	Siegkreis	Peter Etzenbach	CDU
North Rhine-Westphalia	12	Oberbergischer Kreis	August Dresbach	CDU
North Rhine-Westphalia	13	Rheinisch-Bergischer Kreis	Paul Lücke	CDU
North Rhine-Westphalia	14	Rhein-Wupper-Kreis	Günter Henle	CDU
North Rhine-Westphalia	15	Remscheid – Solingen	Hermann Runge	SPD
North Rhine-Westphalia	16	Wuppertal I	Carl Wirths	FDP
North Rhine-Westphalia	17	Wuppertal II	Eugen Huth	CDU
North Rhine-Westphalia	18	Düsseldorf-Mettmann	Gerhard Schröder	CDU
North Rhine-Westphalia	19	Düsseldorf I	Robert Lehr	CDU
North Rhine-Westphalia	20	Düsseldorf II	Josef Gockeln	CDU
North Rhine-Westphalia	21	Neuss – Grevenbroich	Richard Muckermann	CDU
North Rhine-Westphalia	22	Krefeld	Günther Serres	CDU
North Rhine-Westphalia	23	Rheydt – M. Gladbach – Viersen	Hans Schmitz	CDU
North Rhine-Westphalia	24	Kempen-Krefeld	Matthias Hoogen	CDU
North Rhine-Westphalia	25	Moers	Friedhelm Missmahl	SPD
North Rhine-Westphalia	26	Geldern – Kleve	Martin Frey	CDU
North Rhine-Westphalia	27	Rees – Dinslaken	Franz Etzel (Note: Franz Etzel resigned on 4 January 1953.)	CDU
North Rhine-Westphalia	28	Oberhausen	Martin Heix	CDU
North Rhine-Westphalia	29	Mülheim	Otto Striebeck	SPD
North Rhine-Westphalia	30	Essen I	Erwin Lange	SPD
North Rhine-Westphalia	31	Essen II	Karl Bergmann	SPD
North Rhine-Westphalia	32	Essen III	Jakob Kaiser	CDU
North Rhine-Westphalia	33	Duisburg I	Eberhard Brünen	SPD
North Rhine-Westphalia	34	Duisburg II	Gustav Sander	SPD
North Rhine-Westphalia	35	Borken – Bocholt – Ahaus	Theodor Blank	CDU
North Rhine-Westphalia	36	Steinfurt – Tecklenburg	Georg Pelster	CDU
North Rhine-Westphalia	37	Beckum – Warendorf	Bernhard Raestrup	CDU
North Rhine-Westphalia	38	Münster-Stadt und -Land	Peter Nellen	CDU
North Rhine-Westphalia	39	Lüdinghausen – Coesfeld	Hubert Schulze-Pellengahr	CDU
North Rhine-Westphalia	40	Gelsenkirchen	Robert Geritzmann	SPD
North Rhine-Westphalia	41	Recklinghausen-Land	Anton Hoppe	CDU
North Rhine-Westphalia	42	Recklinghausen-Stadt	Bernhard Winkelheide	CDU
North Rhine-Westphalia	43	Gladbeck – Bottrop	Wilhelm Tenhagen	SPD
North Rhine-Westphalia	44	Warburg – Höxter – Büren	Friedrich Holzapfel (Note: Friedrich Holzapfel resigned on 20 January 1953.)	CDU
North Rhine-Westphalia	45	Paderborn – Wiedenbrück	Maria Niggemeyer	CDU
North Rhine-Westphalia	46	Bielefeld – Halle	Johannes Böhm	SPD
North Rhine-Westphalia	47	Bielefeld-Stadt	Frieda Nadig	SPD
North Rhine-Westphalia	48	Herford-Stadt und -Land	Heinrich Höcker	SPD
North Rhine-Westphalia	49	Detmold	August Berlin	SPD
North Rhine-Westphalia	50	Lemgo	Wilhelm Mellies	SPD
North Rhine-Westphalia	51	Minden – Lübbecke	Paul Bleiß	SPD
North Rhine-Westphalia	52	Wattenscheid – Wanne-Eickel	Erich Meyer	SPD
North Rhine-Westphalia	53	Herne – Castrop-Rauxel	Heinrich Imig	SPD
North Rhine-Westphalia	54	Ennepe-Ruhr – Witten	Walter Freitag	SPD
North Rhine-Westphalia	55	Hagen	Luise Rehling	CDU
North Rhine-Westphalia	56	Dortmund I	Fritz Henßler	SPD
North Rhine-Westphalia	57	Dortmund II	Dietrich Keuning	SPD
North Rhine-Westphalia	58	Dortmund III – Lünen	Otto Dannebom	SPD
North Rhine-Westphalia	59	Bochum	Erich Ollenhauer	SPD
North Rhine-Westphalia	60	Iserlohn-Stadt und -Land	Erik Nölting (Note: Erik Nölting died on 15 July 1953.)	SPD
North Rhine-Westphalia	61	Unna – Hamm	Alfred Gleisner	SPD
North Rhine-Westphalia	62	Meschede – Olpe	Hermann Ehren	CDU
North Rhine-Westphalia	63	Arnsberg – Soest	Heinrich Lübke (Note: Heinrich Lübke resigned on 30 September 1950.)	CDU
North Rhine-Westphalia	63	Arnsberg – Soest	Ernst Majonica (Note: Ernst Majonica was by-elected on 19 November 1950, to succeed Heinrich Lübke.)	CDU
North Rhine-Westphalia	64	Lippstadt – Brilon	Aloys Feldmann	CDU
North Rhine-Westphalia	65	Altena – Lüdenscheid	Erwin Welke	SPD
North Rhine-Westphalia	66	Siegen-Stadt und -Land – Wittgenstein	Theodor Siebel	CDU
North Rhine-Westphalia	List		Luise Albertz	SPD
North Rhine-Westphalia	List		Karl Brunner (Note: Karl Brunner died on 13 November 1951.)	SPD
North Rhine-Westphalia	List		Willi Eichler	SPD
North Rhine-Westphalia	List		Robert Görlinger	SPD
North Rhine-Westphalia	List		Heinrich Happe	SPD
North Rhine-Westphalia	List		Rudolf-Ernst Heiland	SPD
North Rhine-Westphalia	List		Werner Jacobi	SPD
North Rhine-Westphalia	List		Georg Richard Kinat	SPD
North Rhine-Westphalia	List		Liesel Kipp-Kaule	SPD
North Rhine-Westphalia	List		Gerhard Lütkens	SPD
North Rhine-Westphalia	List		Walter Menzel	SPD
North Rhine-Westphalia	List		August Weinhold	SPD
North Rhine-Westphalia	List		Maria Ansorge (Note: Maria Ansorge took office on 17 November 1951, to succeed Karl Brunner.)	SPD
North Rhine-Westphalia	List		Franz Heinen (Note: Franz Heinen took office on 24 July 1953, to succeed Erik Nölting.)	SPD
North Rhine-Westphalia	List		Martin Blank	FDP
North Rhine-Westphalia	List		Franz Blücher	FDP
North Rhine-Westphalia	List		Arthur Grundmann	FDP
North Rhine-Westphalia	List		Hermann Höpker-Aschoff (Note: Hermann Höpker-Aschoff resigned on 9 September 1951.)	FDP
North Rhine-Westphalia	List		Albert Ludwig Juncker	FDP
North Rhine-Westphalia	List		Walther Kühn	FDP
North Rhine-Westphalia	List		Erich Mende	FDP
North Rhine-Westphalia	List		Friedrich Middelhauve (Note: Friedrich Middelhauve resigned on 17 October 1950.)	FDP
North Rhine-Westphalia	List		Hans Albrecht Freiherr von Rechenberg (Note: Hans Albrecht Freiherr von Rechenberg died on 19 January 1953.)	FDP
North Rhine-Westphalia	List		Paul Luchtenberg (Note: Paul Luchtenberg took office on 30 October 1950, to succeed Friedrich Middelhauve.)	FDP
North Rhine-Westphalia	List		Oscar Funcke (Note: Oscar Funcke took office on 14 September 1961, to succeed Hermann Höpker-Aschoff.)	FDP
North Rhine-Westphalia	List		Paul Hans Jaeger (Note: Paul Hans Jaeger took office on 22 January 1953, to succeed Hans Albrecht Freiherr von Rechenberg.)	FDP
North Rhine-Westphalia	List		Rudolf Amelunxen (Note: Rudolf Amelunxen resigned on 7 October 1949.)	Centre
North Rhine-Westphalia	List		Thea Arnold	Centre
North Rhine-Westphalia	List		Gregor Determann	Centre
North Rhine-Westphalia	List		Heinrich Glasmeyer	Centre
North Rhine-Westphalia	List		Wilhelm Hamacher (Note: Wilhelm Hamacher died on 29 July 1951.)	Centre
North Rhine-Westphalia	List		Paul Krause (Note: Paul Krause died on 18 October 1950.)	Centre
North Rhine-Westphalia	List		Otto Pannenbecker	Centre
North Rhine-Westphalia	List		Bernhard Reismann	Centre
North Rhine-Westphalia	List		Gerhard Ribbeheger	Centre
North Rhine-Westphalia	List		Helene Wessel	Centre
North Rhine-Westphalia	List		Helmut Bertram (Note: Helmut Bertram took office on 3 November 1949, to succeed Rudolf Amelunxen.)	Centre
North Rhine-Westphalia	List		Alex Willenberg (Note: Alex Willenberg took office on 26 October 1950, to succeed Paul Krause.)	Centre
North Rhine-Westphalia	List		Johannes Hoffmann (Note: Johannes Hoffmann took office on 7 August 1951, to succeed Wilhelm Hamacher.)	Centre
North Rhine-Westphalia	List		Willi Agatz	KPD
North Rhine-Westphalia	List		Paul Harig	KPD
North Rhine-Westphalia	List		Kurt Müller	KPD
North Rhine-Westphalia	List		Hugo Paul	KPD
North Rhine-Westphalia	List		Max Reimann	KPD
North Rhine-Westphalia	List		Heinz Renner	KPD
North Rhine-Westphalia	List		Friedrich Rische	KPD
North Rhine-Westphalia	List		Grete Thiele	KPD
North Rhine-Westphalia	List		Walter Vesper (Note: Walter Vesper resigned on 30 June 1952.)	KPD
North Rhine-Westphalia	List		Heinrich Niebes (Note: Heinrich Niebes took office on 10 July 1952, to succeed Walter Vesper.)	KPD
North Rhine-Westphalia	List		Johannes Kunze	CDU
North Rhine-Westphalia	List		Günther Sewald (Note: Günther Sewald died on 25 November 1949.)	CDU
North Rhine-Westphalia	List		Viktoria Steinbiß	CDU
North Rhine-Westphalia	List		Robert Pferdmenges (Note: Robert Pferdmenges took office on 12 January 1950, to succeed Günther Sewald.)	CDU
North Rhine-Westphalia	List		Johannes Handschumacher (Note: Johannes Handschumacher took office on 21 January 1953, to succeed Franz Etzel.)	CDU
North Rhine-Westphalia	List		Richard Oetzel (Note: Richard Oetzel took office on 24 January 1953, to succeed Friedrich Holzapfel.)	CDU
Hesse	1	I	Karl Rüdiger (Note: Karl Rüdiger died on 20 February 1951.)	FDP
Hesse	1	I	Hans Merten (Note: Hans Merten was by-elected on 15 April 1951, to succeed Karl Rüdiger. He took office on 23 April 1951.)	SPD
Hesse	2	II	Georg August Zinn (Note: Georg August Zinn resigned on 21 January 1951.)	SPD
Hesse	2	II	Ludwig Preller (Note: Ludwig Preller was by-elected on 11 March 1951, to succeed Georg August Zinn. He took office on 16 March 1951.)	SPD
Hesse	3	III	Rudolf Freidhof	SPD
Hesse	4	IV	August-Martin Euler	FDP
Hesse	5	V	Adolf Arndt	SPD
Hesse	6	VI	Ludwig Preiß	FDP
Hesse	7	VII	Karl Gaul	FDP
Hesse	8	VIII	Ludwig Schneider	FDP
Hesse	9	IX	Anton Sabel	CDU
Hesse	10	X	Heinrich Müller	SPD
Hesse	11	XI	Wilhelm Knothe (Note: Wilhelm Knothe died on 20 February 1952.)	SPD
Hesse	11	XI	Kurt Moosdorf (Note: Kurt Moosdorf was by-elected on 4 May 1952, to succeed Wilhelm Knothe.)	SPD
Hesse	12	XII	Josef Arndgen	CDU
Hesse	13	XIII	Victor-Emanuel Preusker	FDP
Hesse	14	XIV	Jakob Altmaier	SPD
Hesse	15	XV	Hermann Brill	SPD
Hesse	16	XVI	Willi Birkelbach	SPD
Hesse	17	XVII	Georg Stierle	SPD
Hesse	18	XVIII	Ludwig Bergsträsser	SPD
Hesse	19	XIX	Harald Koch	SPD
Hesse	20	XX	Richard Hammer	FDP
Hesse	21	XXI	Heinrich Georg Ritzel	SPD
Hesse	22	XXII	Heinrich von Brentano	CDU
Hesse	List		Hermann Götz	CDU
Hesse	List		Anne Marie Heiler	CDU
Hesse	List		Werner Hilpert (Note: Werner Hilpert resigned on 10 October 1949.)	CDU
Hesse	List		Erich Köhler	CDU
Hesse	List		Willy Massoth	CDU
Hesse	List		Hans Schlange-Schöningen (Note: Hans Schlange-Schöningen resigned on 9 June 1950.)	CDU
Hesse	List		Heinrich Hohl (Note: Heinrich Hohl took office on 3 November 1949, to succeed Werner Hilpert.)	CDU
Hesse	List		Peter Horn (Note: Peter Horn took office on 10 June 1950, to succeed Hans Schlange-Schöningen.)	CDU
Hesse	List		Max Becker	FDP
Hesse	List		Heinrich Fassbender	FDP
Hesse	List		Hans Friedrich	FDP
Hesse	List		Otto Kneipp	FDP
Hesse	List		Heinrich Leuchtgens	FDP
Hesse	List		Walter Fisch	KPD
Hesse	List		Oskar Müller	KPD
Hesse	List		Willi Richter	SPD
Rhineland-Palatinate	1	Altenkirchen (Westerwald)	Franz-Josef Wuermeling	CDU
Rhineland-Palatinate	2	Ahrweiler	Johann Junglas	CDU
Rhineland-Palatinate	3	Koblenz	Karl Weber	CDU
Rhineland-Palatinate	4	Cochem	Paul Gibbert	CDU
Rhineland-Palatinate	5	Kreuznach	Hugo Mayer	CDU
Rhineland-Palatinate	6	Prüm	Matthias Joseph Mehs	CDU
Rhineland-Palatinate	7	Trier	Heinrich Kemper	CDU
Rhineland-Palatinate	8	Westerburg	Robert Stauch	CDU
Rhineland-Palatinate	9	Mainz	Joseph Schmitt	CDU
Rhineland-Palatinate	10	Worms	Willy Müller	SPD
Rhineland-Palatinate	11	Ludwigshafen am Rhein	Friedrich Wilhelm Wagner	SPD
Rhineland-Palatinate	12	Neustadt an der Weinstraße	Ernst Roth (Note: Ernst Roth died on 14 May 1951.)	SPD
Rhineland-Palatinate	12	Neustadt an der Weinstraße	Willy Odenthal (Note: Willy Odenthal was by-elected on 23 September 1951, to succeed Ernst Roth. He took office on 28 September 1951.)	SPD
Rhineland-Palatinate	13	Kaiserslautern	Adolf Ludwig	SPD
Rhineland-Palatinate	14	Zweibrücken	Josef Becker	CDU
Rhineland-Palatinate	15	Speyer	Eduard Orth	CDU
Rhineland-Palatinate	List		Karl Atzenroth	FDP
Rhineland-Palatinate	List		Fritz Neumayer	FDP
Rhineland-Palatinate	List		Robert Philipp Nöll von der Nahmer	FDP
Rhineland-Palatinate	List		Wilhelm Nowack (Note: Wilhelm Nowack resigned on 30 September 1952.)	FDP
Rhineland-Palatinate	List		Anton Eberhard (Note: Anton Eberhard took office on 3 October 1952, to succeed Wilhelm Nowack.)	FDP
Rhineland-Palatinate	List		Emil Bettgenhäuser	SPD
Rhineland-Palatinate	List		Anton Diel	SPD
Rhineland-Palatinate	List		Peter Jacobs	SPD
Rhineland-Palatinate	List		Maria Dietz	CDU
Rhineland-Palatinate	List		Jakob Neber	CDU
Rhineland-Palatinate	List		Otto Niebergall	KPD
Bavaria	1	Altötting	Georg Mayerhofer	BP
Bavaria	2	Fürstenfeldbruck	Richard Jaeger	CSU
Bavaria	3	Ingolstadt	Hermann Aumer	BP
Bavaria	4	Miesbach	Josef Eichner	BP
Bavaria	5	Munich North	Walter Seuffert	SPD
Bavaria	6	Munich East	Franz Marx	SPD
Bavaria	7	Munich South	Max Wönner	SPD
Bavaria	8	Munich West	Otto Graf	SPD
Bavaria	9	Munich Land	Anton Besold	BP
Bavaria	10	Rosenheim	Hugo Decker	BP
Bavaria	11	Traunstein	Sepp Parzinger	BP
Bavaria	12	Weilheim	Franz Josef Strauss	CSU
Bavaria	13	Deggendorf	Ludwig Volkholz	BP
Bavaria	14	Landshut	Elimar Freiherr von Fürstenberg	BP
Bavaria	15	Passau	Fritz Schäffer	CSU
Bavaria	16	Pfarrkirchen	Conrad Fink	BP
Bavaria	17	Straubing	Johann Wartner	BP
Bavaria	18	Vilshofen	Anton von Aretin	BP
Bavaria	19	Amberg	Josef Schatz	CSU
Bavaria	20	Burglengenfeld	Karl Kahn	CSU
Bavaria	21	Cham	Christof Nickl	CSU
Bavaria	22	Regensburg	Max Solleder	CSU
Bavaria	23	Tirschenreuth	Hans Bodensteiner	CSU
Bavaria	24	Bamberg	Emil Kemmer	CSU
Bavaria	25	Bayreuth	Matthäus Herrmann	SPD
Bavaria	26	Coburg	Ernst Zühlke	SPD
Bavaria	27	Forchheim	Michael Horlacher	CSU
Bavaria	28	Hof	Arno Behrisch	SPD
Bavaria	29	Kulmbach	Friedrich Schönauer (Note: Friedrich Schönauer died on 2 April 1950.)	SPD
Bavaria	29	Kulmbach	Johannes Semler (Note: Johannes Semler was by-elected on 14 May 1950, to succeed Friedrich Schönauer.)	CSU
Bavaria	30	Ansbach	Friedrich Bauereisen	CSU
Bavaria	31	Erlangen	Willibald Mücke	SPD
Bavaria	32	Nuremberg	Walter Sassnick	SPD
Bavaria	33	Nuremberg-Fürth	Wilhelm Fischer (Note: Wilhelm Fischer died on 21 October 1951.)	SPD
Bavaria	33	Nuremberg-Fürth	Johann Segitz (Note: Johann Segitz was by-elected on 2 December 1951, to succeed Wilhelm Fischer. He took office on 4 December 1951.)	SPD
Bavaria	34	Schwabach	Georg Kurlbaum	SPD
Bavaria	35	Weißenburg	Richard Stücklen	CSU
Bavaria	36	Aschaffenburg	Hugo Karpf	CSU
Bavaria	37	Bad Kissingen	Gustav Fuchs	CSU
Bavaria	38	Karlstadt	Maria Probst	CSU
Bavaria	39	Schweinfurt	Friedrich Funk	CSU
Bavaria	40	Würzburg	Wilhelm Laforet	CSU
Bavaria	41	Augsburg-Stadt	Josef Ferdinand Kleindinst	CSU
Bavaria	42	Augsburg-Land	Josef Oesterle	CSU
Bavaria	43	Dillingen	Hans Schütz	CSU
Bavaria	44	Donauwörth	Martin Loibl (Note: Martin Loibl died on 16 April 1951.)	CSU
Bavaria	44	Donauwörth	Wilhelm Niklas (Note: Wilhelm Niklas was by-elected on 27 May 1951, to succeed Martin Loibl. He took office on 30 May 1951.)	CSU
Bavaria	45	Kaufbeuren	Josef Spies	CSU
Bavaria	46	Kempten	Karl von Spreti	CSU
Bavaria	47	Memmingen	Joseph-Ernst Graf Fugger von Glött	CSU
Bavaria	List		Anna Maria Bieganowski	WAV
Bavaria	List		Hans-Gerd Fröhlich	WAV
Bavaria	List		Günter Goetzendorff	WAV
Bavaria	List		Hans Löfflad	WAV
Bavaria	List		Alfred Loritz	WAV
Bavaria	List		Wilhelm Paschek (Note: Wilhelm Paschek died on 22 April 1952.)	WAV
Bavaria	List		Otto Reindl	WAV
Bavaria	List		Wilhelm Schmidt	WAV
Bavaria	List		Johann Schuster	WAV
Bavaria	List		Hans Tichi	WAV
Bavaria	List		Josef Wallner	WAV
Bavaria	List		Stephan Weickert (Note: Stephan Weickert died on 16 March 1952.)	WAV
Bavaria	List		Konrad Wittmann	WAV
Bavaria	List		Wilfried Keller (Note: Wilfried Keller took office on 24 April 1952, to succeed Wilhelm Paschek.)	WAV
Bavaria	List		Thomas Dehler	FDP
Bavaria	List		Hans Dirscherl	FDP
Bavaria	List		Konrad Frühwald	FDP
Bavaria	List		Fritz Linnert (Note: Fritz Linnert died on 27 October 1949.)	FDP
Bavaria	List		Josef Trischler	FDP
Bavaria	List		Hans Wellhausen	FDP
Bavaria	List		Walter Zawadil	FDP
Bavaria	List		Herta Ilk (Note: Herta Ilk took office on 3 November 1949, to succeed Fritz Linnert.)	FDP
Bavaria	List		Lisa Albrecht	SPD
Bavaria	List		Valentin Baur	SPD
Bavaria	List		Franz Höhne	SPD
Bavaria	List		Waldemar von Knoeringen (Note: Waldemar von Knoeringen resigned on 3 April 1951.)	SPD
Bavaria	List		Richard Reitzner	SPD
Bavaria	List		Käte Strobel	SPD
Bavaria	List		Gerhard Kreyssig (Note: Gerhard Kreyssig took office on 4 April 1951, to succeed Waldemar von Knoeringen.)	SPD
Bavaria	List		Joseph Baumgartner (Note: Joseph Baumgartner resigned on 1 January 1951.)	BP
Bavaria	List		Anton Donhauser	BP
Bavaria	List		Hermann Etzel	BP
Bavaria	List		Ernst Falkner (Note: Ernst Falkner died on 27 October 1950.)	BP
Bavaria	List		Gebhard Seelos (Note: Gebhard Seelos resigned on 25 September 1951.)	BP
Bavaria	List		Franz Ziegler (Note: Franz Ziegler died on 30 December 1949.)	BP
Bavaria	List		Wilhelm Rahn (Note: Wilhelm Rahn took office on 14 January 1950, to succeed Franz Ziegler.)	BP
Bavaria	List		Roman Lampl (Note: Roman Lampl took office on 10 November 1950, to succeed Ernst Falkner.)	BP
Bavaria	List		Eugen Fürst zu Oettingen-Wallerstein (Note: Eugen Fürst zu Oettingen-Wallerstein took office on 8 January 1951, to succeed Joseph Baumgartner.)	BP
Bavaria	List		Franz Xaver Meitinger (Note: Franz Xaver Meitinger took office on 26 September 1951, to succeed Gebhard Seelos.)	BP
Bavaria	List		Heinrich Maerkl (Note: Heinrich Maerkl took office on 1 September 1952, to succeed Eugen Fürst zu Oettingen-Wallerstein.)	BP
Baden	1	Konstanz	Josef Schüttler	CDU
Baden	2	Donaueschingen	Anton Hilbert	CDU
Baden	3	Lörrach	Lambert Schill	CDU
Baden	4	Freiburg	Hermann Kopf	CDU
Baden	5	Emmendingen	Heinrich Höfler	CDU
Baden	6	Offenburg	Oskar Rümmele	CDU
Baden	7	Rastatt	Wendelin Morgenthaler	CDU
Baden	List		Friedrich Maier	SPD
Baden	List		Gustav Herbig (Note: Gustav Herbig resigned on 1 December 1951.)	SPD
Baden	List		Marta Schanzenbach	SPD
Baden	List		Walter Faller (Note: Walter Faller took office on 4 December 1951, to succeed Gustav Herbig.)	SPD
Baden	List		Karl Hoffmann	FDP
Baden	List		Willy Stahl	FDP
Württemberg-Baden	1	Stuttgart I	Clara Döhring	SPD
Württemberg-Baden	2	Stuttgart II	Erwin Schoettle	SPD
Württemberg-Baden	3	Ludwigsburg	Willi Lausen	SPD
Württemberg-Baden	4	Heilbronn	Georg Kohl (Note: Georg Kohl died on 31 January 1952.)	FDP
Württemberg-Baden	4	Heilbronn	Adolf Mauk (Note: Adolf Mauk was by-elected on 20 March 1952, to succeed Georg Kohl. He took office on 7 April 1952.)	FDP
Württemberg-Baden	5	Böblingen	Paul Bausch	CDU
Württemberg-Baden	6	Esslingen	Franz Ott	Independent
Württemberg-Baden	7	Göppingen	Georg Baur	CDU
Württemberg-Baden	8	Ulm	Ludwig Erhard	CDU
Württemberg-Baden	9	Aalen	Rudolf Vogel	CDU
Württemberg-Baden	10	Backnang	Eugen Gerstenmaier	CDU
Württemberg-Baden	11	Crailsheim	Josef Brönner	CDU
Württemberg-Baden	12	Waiblingen	Karl Georg Pfleiderer	FDP
Württemberg-Baden	13	Karlsruhe-Stadt	Hermann Veit	SPD
Württemberg-Baden	14	Mannheim-Stadt	Carlo Schmid	SPD
Württemberg-Baden	15	Heidelberg	Eduard Wahl	CDU
Württemberg-Baden	16	Karlsruhe-Land	Gottfried Leonhard	CDU
Württemberg-Baden	17	Bruchsal	August Neuburger	CDU
Württemberg-Baden	18	Mannheim-Land	Richard Freudenberg	Independent
Württemberg-Baden	19	Sinsheim	Eugen Leibfried	CDU
Württemberg-Baden	20	Tauberbischofsheim	Oskar Wacker	CDU
Württemberg-Baden	List		Helmut Bazille	SPD
Württemberg-Baden	List		Oskar Matzner	SPD
Württemberg-Baden	List		Emmy Meyer-Laule	SPD
Württemberg-Baden	List		Karl Mommer	SPD
Württemberg-Baden	List		Ernst Paul	SPD
Württemberg-Baden	List		Theodor Heuss (Note: Theodor Heuss resigned on 15 September 1949.)	FDP
Württemberg-Baden	List		Hubertus von Golitschek	FDP
Württemberg-Baden	List		Robert Margulies	FDP
Württemberg-Baden	List		Ernst Mayer (Note: Ernst Mayer died on 18 December 1952.)	FDP
Württemberg-Baden	List		Wilhelm Rath	FDP
Württemberg-Baden	List		Margarete Hütter (Note: Margarete Hütter took office on 15 September 1949, to succeed Theodor Heuss.)	FDP
Württemberg-Baden	List		Axel de Vries (Note: Axel de Vries took office on 5 January 1953, to succeed Ernst Mayer.)	FDP
Württemberg-Baden	List		Karl Kern	CDU
Württemberg-Baden	List		Robert Leibbrand (Note: Robert Leibbrand resigned on 26 January 1950.)	KPD
Württemberg-Baden	List		Hermann Nuding (Note: Hermann Nuding resigned on 20 April 1951.)	KPD
Württemberg-Baden	List		Rudolf Kohl (Note: Rudolf Kohl took office on 26 January 1950, to succeed Robert Leibbrand.)	KPD
Württemberg-Baden	List		Gertrud Strohbach (Note: Gertrud Strohbach took office on 16 May 1951, to succeed Hermann Nuding.)	KPD
Württemberg-Hohenzollern	1	Reutlingen	Oskar Kalbfell	SPD
Württemberg-Hohenzollern	2	Calw	Fritz Schuler	CDU
Württemberg-Hohenzollern	3	Rottweil	Karl Gengler	CDU
Württemberg-Hohenzollern	4	Balingen	Franz Weiß	CDU
Württemberg-Hohenzollern	5	Biberach	Bernhard Bauknecht	CDU
Württemberg-Hohenzollern	6	Ravensburg	Kurt Georg Kiesinger	CDU
Württemberg-Hohenzollern	List		Franz Pfender	CDU
Württemberg-Hohenzollern	List		Julie Rösch	CDU
Württemberg-Hohenzollern	List		Fritz Erler	SPD
Württemberg-Hohenzollern	List		Hermann-Eberhard Wildermuth (Note: Hermann-Eberhard Wildermuth died on 9 March 1952.)	FDP
Württemberg-Hohenzollern	List		Eduard Leuze (Note: Eduard Leuze took office on 21 March 1952, to succeed Hermann-Eberhard Wildermuth.)	FDP
West Berlin			Willy Brandt	SPD
West Berlin			Paul Löbe	SPD
West Berlin			Franz Neumann	SPD
West Berlin			Louise Schroeder	SPD
West Berlin			Otto Suhr (Note: Otto Suhr resigned on 31 January 1952.)	SPD
West Berlin			Ernst Schellenberg (Note: Ernst Schellenberg took office on 1 February 1952, to succeed Otto Suhr.)	SPD
West Berlin			Wilhelm Königswarter (Note: Wilhelm Königswarter took office on 1 February 1952.)	SPD
West Berlin			Kurt Neubauer (Note: Kurt Neubauer took office on 1 February 1952.)	SPD
West Berlin			Richard Schröter (Note: Richard Schröter took office on 1 February 1952.)	SPD
West Berlin			Jeanette Wolff (Note: Jeanette Wolff took office on 1 February 1952.)	SPD
West Berlin			Heinrich Krone	CDU
West Berlin			Robert Tillmanns	CDU
West Berlin			Ferdinand Friedensburg (Note: Ferdinand Friedensburg took office on 1 February 1952.)	CDU
West Berlin			Ernst Lemmer (Note: Ernst Lemmer took office on 1 February 1952.)	CDU
West Berlin			Agnes Katharina Maxsein (Note: Agnes Katharina Maxsein took office on 1 February 1952.)	CDU
West Berlin			Hans Reif	FDP
West Berlin			Hans Henn (Note: Hans Henn took office on 1 February 1952.)	FDP
West Berlin			Karl Hübner (Note: Karl Hübner took office on 1 February 1952.)	FDP
West Berlin			Friederike Mulert (Note: Friederike Mulert took office on 1 February 1952.)	FDP
West Berlin			Rudolf Will (Note: Rudolf Will took office on 1 February 1952.)	FDP

== See also ==
- Politics of Germany
- List of Bundestag Members
