= List of members of the Bundestag who died in office =

List of German MPs who died in office

The following is a list of members of the German Bundestag who died in office since its establishment in 1949.

== West Germany (1949-1990) ==
Member	Party	Constituency	Date of death	Age at death (years)	Cause
Fritz Linnert	FDP	Bavaria	27 October 1949	64	
Günther Sewald	CDU	North Rhine-Westphalia	25 November 1949	44	
Friedrich Klinge	DP	Lower Saxony	21 December 1949	66	
Franz Ziegler	BP	Bavaria	30 December 1949	50	
Friedrich Schönauer	SPD	Bavaria	2 April 1950	45	
Paul Krause	Centre	North Rhine-Westphalia	18 October 1950	44	
Ernst Falkner	BP	Bavaria	27 October 1950	41	
Erich Klabunder	SPD	Hamburg	27 October 1950	43	Stroke
Karl Rüdiger	FDP	Hesse (Waldeck)	20 February 1951	54	Road accident
Martin Loibl	CSU	Bavaria (Donauwörth)	16 April 1951	52	
Bruno Leddin	SPD	Lower Saxony (Hannover North)	25 April 1951	53	
Ernst Roth	SPD	Rhineland-Palatinate (Neustadt an der Weinstrasse)	14 May 1951	50	Stroke
Wilhelm Hamacher	Centre	North Rhine-Westphalia	29 July 1951	67	
Wilhelm Fischer	SPD	Bavaria (Nuremberg–Fürth)	21 October 1951	47	
Karl Brunner	SPD	North Rhine-Westphalia	13 November 1951	46	
Hermann Stopperich	SPD	Lower Saxony (Goslar)	6 January 1952	56	
Georg Kohl	FDP	Baden-Württemberg (Heilbronn)	31 January 1952	70	
Wilhelm Knothe	SPD	Hesse (Friedberg)	20 February 1952	63	
Carl Schröter	CDU	Schleswig-Holstein (Segeberg–Neumünster)	25 February 1952	64	
Bernhard Lohmüller	SPD	Bremen (Bremerhaven–Bremen North)	2 March 1952	60	
Hermann-Eberhard Wildermuth	FDP	Württemberg-Hohenzollern	9 March 1952	61	
Stephan Weickert	GB/BHE	Bavaria	16 March 1952	59	
Kurt Schumacher	SPD	Lower Saxony (Hannover South)	20 August 1952	56	
Ernst Mayer	FDP	Baden-Württemberg	18 December 1952	51	
Hans Albrecht Freiherr von Rechenberg	FDP	North Rhine-Westphalia	19 January 1953	60	
Walther Kolbe	CDU	North Rhine-Westphalia	25 December 1953	53	
Franz Böhner	Centre	North Rhine-Westphalia	8 January 1954	64	
Robert Görlinger	SPD	North Rhine-Westphalia	10 February 1954	65	
Ernst Winter	SPD	Lower Saxony (Hannover South)	7 March 1954	65	
Wilhelm Tenhagen	SPD	North Rhine-Westphalia	22 August 1954	42	Fall
Hermann Ehlers	CDU	Lower Saxony (Delmenhorst–Wesermarsch)	29 October 1954	50	Tonsilitis
Carl Wirths	FDP	North Rhine-Westphalia (Wuppertal I)	16 June 1955	57	
Fritz Schuler	CDU	Baden-Württemberg (Calw)	30 July 1955	70	
Walter Sassnick	SPD	Bavaria (Nuremberg)	6 November 1955	60	
Hans Griem	CDU	Hamburg (Hamburg VI)	7 November 1955	53	
Robert Tillmanns	CDU	Berlin	12 November 1955	59	Heart attack
Gerhard Lütkens	SPD	North Rhine-Westphalia	17 November 1955	62	
Wilhelm Naegel	CDU	Lower Saxony	24 May 1956	52	
Otto Ziegler	SPD	Lower Saxony	27 July 1956	61	
Otto Lenz	CDU	Rhineland-Palatinate (Ahrweiler)	2 May 1957	53	Malaria
Louise Schroeder	SPD	Berlin	4 June 1957	70	Heart attack
Johannes Böhm	SPD	North Rhine-Westphalia (Bielefeld-Halle)	18 July 1957	67	
Walter Brookmann	CDU	Schleswig-Holstein (Kiel)	31 August 1957	56	
Josef Brönner	CDU	Baden-Württemberg (Crailsheim)	21 January 1958	73	
Wolfgang Klausner	CSU	Bavaria (Traunstein)	17 April 1958	52	Road accident
Lisa Albrecht	SPD	Bavaria	16 May 1958	61	
Wilhelm Mellies	SPD	North Rhine-Westphalia (Lemgo)	19 May 1958	58	
Karl Arnold	CDU	North Rhine-Westphalia (Geilenkirchen–Erkelenz–Jülich)	29 June 1958	57	Heart attack
Josef Gockeln	CDU	North Rhine-Westphalia (Düsseldorf II)	6 December 1958	57	Road accident
Fritz Heinrich	SPD	North Rhine-Westphalia	7 March 1959	38	Injuries from World War II
Anton Diel	SPD	Rhineland-Palatinate	6 April 1959	61	
Ernst Pernoll	CDU	Lower Saxony (Harburg-Soltau)	15 July 1959	56	
Josef Oesterle	CSU	Bavaria (Augsburg-Land)	31 August 1959	60	
Johannes Kunze	CDU	North Rhine-Westphalia (Iserlohn)	11 October 1959	67	
Philipp Wehr	SPD	Bremen (Bremerhaven–Bremen North)	20 February 1960	53	
Hermann Lindrath	CDU	Baden-Württemberg (Mannheim-Land)	27 February 1960	63	
Paul Leverkuehn	CDU	Hamburg	1 March 1960	66	
Wilhelm Gülich	SPD	Schleswig-Holstein	15 April 1960	64	
Adolf Cillien	CDU	Lower Saxony (Hannover North)	29 April 1960	67	
Otto Köhler	FDP	Schleswig-Holstein	27 June 1960	63	
Hans Jahn	SPD	Lower Saxony (Hannover Land)	10 July 1960	74	
Max Becker	FDP	Hesse	29 July 1960	72	
Hugo Rasch	SPD	North Rhine-Westphalia	15 September 1960	47	
Friedrich Maier	SPD	Baden-Württemberg	14 December 1960	65	
Kurt Pohle	SPD	Schleswig-Holstein	3 November 1961	62	
Philipp Meyer	CSU	Bavaria (Donauwörth)	29 January 1962	75	
Adolf Ludwig	SPD	Rhineland-Palatinate	18 February 1962	69	
Hermann Finckh	SPD	Baden-Württemberg (Göppingen)	28 April 1962	51	
Richard Reitzner	SPD	Bavaria	11 May 1962	68	
Georg von Manteuffel-Szoege	CSU	Bavaria (Schwabach)	8 June 1962	73	
Julius Brecht	SPD	North Rhine-Westphalia	10 July 1962	62	
Helene Weber	CDU	North Rhine-Westphalia	25 July 1962	81	
Robert Pferdemenges	CDU	North Rhine-Westphalia	28 September 1962	82	
Walther Kühn	FDP	North Rhine-Westphalia	4 December 1962	69	
Jakob Altmaier	SPD	Hesse (Hanau)	8 January 1963	73	Heart attack
Wolfgang Döring	FDP	North Rhine-Westphalia	17 January 1963	43	Heart attack
Karl-Heinz Lünenstraß	SPD	North Rhine-Westphalia	22 May 1963	43	Heart attack
Ernst Keller	FDP	North Rhine-Westphalia	21 July 1963	62	
Friedrich Funk	CSU	Bavaria (Schweinfurt)	5 August 1963	62	
Heinrich Gerns	CDU	Schleswig-Holstein (Plön–Eutin/North)	20 August 1963	71	
Walter Menzel	SPD	North Rhine-Westphalia	24 September 1963	62	
Heinrich Höfler	CDU	Baden-Württemberg (Emmendingen)	21 October 1963	66	
Günter Klein	SPD	Berlin	22 October 1963	63	
Erich Ollenbauer	SPD	Lower Saxony (Hannover South)	14 December 1963	62	Pulmonary embolism
Wilhelm Goldhagen	CDU	Schleswig-Holstein (Pinneberg)	7 January 1964	62	
Heinrich Deist	SPD	North Rhine-Westphalia (Bochum)	7 March 1964	61	
Luise Rehling	CDU	North Rhine-Westphalia	29 May 1964	67	Stroke
Josef Lermer	CSU	Bavaria (Straubing)	15 July 1964	69	
Walter Harm	SPD	Lower Saxony	10 August 1964	57	
Kurt Schröder	SPD	Lower Saxony (Goslar)	6 September 1964	57	
Franz Ruland	CDU	Saarland	28 September 1964	63	
Ladislaus Winterstein	SPD	Hesse	2 November 1964	59	
Heinrich von Brentano	CDU	Hesse (Bergstrasse)	14 November 1964	60	Esophageal cancer
Johannes Even	CDU	North Rhine-Westphalia (Bergheim-Euskirchen)	24 November 1964	60	
Hermann Ehren	CDU	North Rhine-Westphalia	30 November 1964	70	
Rudolf Ernst Heiland	SPD	North Rhine-Westphalia	6 May 1965	54	
Georg Lang	CSU	Bavaria (Munich East)	1 June 1965	52	
Friedrich Wilhelm Willeke	CDU	North Rhine-Westphalia (Recklinghausen-Land)	24 June 1965	71	Heart attack
Gerhard Philipp	CDU	North Rhine-Westphalia	20 April 1966	62	
Josef Braun	SPD	Berlin	17 July 1966	59	
Wenzel Jaksch	SPD	North Rhine-Westphalia	27 November 1966	70	Road accident
Hans Verbeek	CDU	North Rhine-Westphalia (Bergheim)	13 December 1966	49	
Fritz Erler	SPD	Baden-Württemberg	22 February 1967	53	Cancer
Heinrich Wilper	CDU	North Rhine-Westphalia (Höxter)	3 March 1967	58	
Helmut Schlüter	SPD	Lower Saxony	7 April 1967	41	
Konrad Adenauer	CDU	North Rhine-Westphalia (Bonn)	19 April 1967	91	Heart attack
Maria Probst	CSU	Bavaria (Karlstadt)	1 May 1967	64	
Thomas Dehler	FDP	Bavaria	21 July 1967	69	Heart failure
Theodor Mengelkamp	CDU	North Rhine-Westphalia (Iserlohn)	21 July 1967	43	Heart attack
Franz Stein	SPD	Rhineland-Palatinate	14 September 1967	67	
Hans-Christoph Seebohm	CDU	Lower Saxony (Harburg-Soltau)	17 September 1967	64	Pulmonary embolism
Hermann Reinholz	CDU	Rhineland-Palatinate	7 October 1967	43	
Günter Frede	SPD	Lower Saxony	23 November 1967	66	
Rudolf Hussong	SPD	Saarland (Saarbrücken-Stadt)	10 December 1967	64	
Hans Merten	SPD	Hesse (Gießen)	12 December 1967	69	
Paul Gibbert	CDU	Rhineland-Palatinate (Cochem)	30 December 1967	69	
Hans Wellmann	SPD	Berlin	30 May 1969	57	
Konstantin Prinz von Bayern	CSU	Bavaria (Munich-Mitte)	30 July 1969	48	Plane crash
Paul Kübler	SPD	Baden-Württemberg (Mannheim II)	9 August 1969	46	
Helene Wessel	SPD	North Rhine-Westphalia	13 October 1969	71	
Albrecht Haas	FDP	Bavaria	21 January 1970	63	
Friedhelm Dohmann	SPD	North Rhine-Westphalia (Dortmund II)	20 February 1970	38	
Werner Jacobi	SPD	North Rhine-Westphalia (Iserlohn)	5 March 1970	63	
Alfred Burgemeister	CDU	Lower Saxony	23 April 1970	63	
Ernst Lemmer	CDU	Berlin	18 August 1970	72	
Hermann Haage	SPD	Bavaria	21 December 1970	58	
Franz Xaver Unertl	CSU	Bavaria (Passau)	30 December 1970	59	
Udo Hein	SPD	North Rhine-Westphalia (Dinslaken)	19 January 1971	56	
Alfred Hein	CDU	Lower Saxony	18 April 1971	56	
Wolfgang Pohle	CSU	Bavaria (Kempten)	27 August 1971	67	
Will Rasner	CDU	Schleswig-Holstein	15 October 1971	51	
Rudi Lotze	SPD	Lower Saxony	17 October 1971	49	
Maria Henz	CDU	Lower Saxony	10 April 1972	46	
Karl-Hermann Flach	FDP	Hesse	25 August 1973	43	Stroke
Berthold Martin	CDU	Hesse (Obertaunuskreis)	12 November 1973	60	
Klaus Dieter Arndt	SPD	Berlin	29 January 1974	46	
Werner Ferrang	CDU	Saarland	31 May 1974	50	
Günter Slotta	SPD	Saarland (Saarbrücken-Stadt)	9 June 1974	49	
Friedrich Freiwald	CDU	Hesse	26 October 1974	63	
Roelf Heyen	SPD	Berlin	5 November 1974	36	Heart disease
Friedrich Beermann	SPD	Schleswig-Holstein (Stormarn–Herzogtum Lauenburg)	24 November 1974	63	
Carlo Graaff	FDP	Lower Saxony	9 December 1974	61	
Elisabeth Orth	SPD	Schleswig-Holstein (Rendsburg–Neumünster)	10 May 1976	55	
Alex Hösl	CSU	Bavaria (Bad Kissingen)	20 March 1977	57	
Ludwig Erhard	CDU	Baden-Württemberg	5 May 1977	80	Heart failure
Hermann Spillecke	CDU	North Rhine-Westphalia (Duisburg II)	5 May 1977	52	
Wolfgang Schwabe	SPD	Hesse (Bergstrasse)	4 January 1978	67	
Alfred Ollesch	FDP	North Rhine-Westphalia	16 April 1978	62	
Bertram Blank	SPD	North Rhine-Westphalia	23 May 1978	58	
Reinhold Staud	SPD	Hesse (Darmstadt)	11 September 1978	49	
Adolf Scheu	SPD	North Rhine-Westphalia (Wuppertal I)	20 December 1978	71	
Egon Höhmann	SPD	Hesse (Eschwege)	19 January 1979	52	
Walter Peters	FDP	Schleswig-Holstein	8 April 1979	66	
Hermann Schmitt-Vockenhausen	SPD	Hesse (Groß-Gerau)	2 August 1979	49	
Heinrich Reichold	CSU	Bavaria	2 October 1979	49	
Kurt Koblitz	SPD	North Rhine-Westphalia (Aachen-Land)	13 October 1979	63	
Lauritz Lauritzen	SPD	Schleswig-Holstein (Plön)	5 June 1980	70	
Horst Korber	SPD	Berlin	2 July 1981	54	
Franz Amrehn	CDU	Berlin	4 October 1981	68	
Albert Burger	CDU	Baden-Württemberg (Emmendingen-Lahr)	10 October 1981	56	
Hans Hubrig	CDU	Lower Saxony (Celle)	25 March 1982	57	
Egon Lampersbach	CDU	North Rhine-Westphalia	16 December 1982	65	
Hermann Schmidt	SPD	North Rhine-Westphalia (Siegen-Wittgenstein I)	10 February 1983	66	
Gerhard Brosi	SPD	Baden-Württemberg	3 April 1984	40	
Harm Dallmeyer	CDU	Schleswig-Holstein (Flensburg-Schleswig)	11 April 1984	40	
Alois Mertes	CDU	Rhineland-Palatinate (Bitburg)	16 June 1985	63	Stroke
Werner Marx	CDU	Rhineland-Palatinate (Pirmasens)	12 July 1985	60	Complications from arterial surgery
Walter Polkehn	SPD	Lower Saxony (Oldenburg)	3 April 1985	64	
Franz-Josef Conrad	CDU	Saarland (Saarbrücken II)	12 September 1985	41	
Haimo George	CDU	Baden-Württemberg (Calw)	5 October 1985	52	Heart attack
Helga Wex	CDU	North Rhine-Westphalia	9 January 1986	61	Cancer
Peter Milz	CDU	North Rhine-Westphalia (Euskirchen–Erftkreis II )	26 November 1986	51	
Ruth Zutt	SPD	Baden-Württemberg	19 June 1987	58	
Peter Lorenz	CDU	Berlin	6 December 1987	64	Heart failure
Lieselotte Berger	CDU	Berlin	26 September 1989	68	
Heinrich Klein	SPD	Hesse	18 December 1989	57	
Werner Weiß	CDU	Rhineland-Palatinate	6 February 1990	63	

== Post-reunification (1990-present) ==
Member	Party	Constituency	Date of death	Age at death (years)	Cause
Gerhard Riege	PDS	Thuringia	15 February 1992	61	Suicide by hanging
Hubert Doppmeier	CDU	North Rhine-Westphalia (Gütersloh)	8 March 1992	48	
Lutz Stavenhagen	CDU	Baden-Württemberg (Pforzheim)	31 May 1992	52	Pneumonia
Franz-Hermann Kappes	CDU	Hesse (Bergstrasse)	24 August 1992	53	Heart attack
Willy Brandt	SPD	North Rhine-Westphalia	8 October 1992	78	Intestinal cancer
Walter Rempe	SPD	North Rhine-Westphalia (Cologne I)	22 April 1993	59	
Günther Tietjen	SPD	Lower Saxony	7 July 1993	49	
Richard Bayha	SPD	Hesse (Hanau)	3 November 1993	64	
Hans H. Gattermann	FDP	North Rhine-Westphalia	27 January 1994	62	Heart failure
Klaus Beckmann	FDP	North Rhine-Westphalia	27 May 1994	49	
Rainer Haungs	CDU	Baden-Württemberg (Emmendingen-Lahr)	18 January 1996	53	
Ulrich Böhme	SPD	North Rhine-Westphalia (Unna I)	7 February 1996	56	
Heinz-Adolf Hörsken	CDU	Hesse (Groß-Gerau)	23 February 1996	57	
Hans Klein	CSU	Bavaria	26 November 1996	65	Heart attack
Karl H. Fell	CDU	North Rhine-Westphalia (Heinsberg)	5 December 1996	59	
Christine Kurzhals	SPD	Saxony	4 May 1998	47	
Michaela Geiger	CSU	Bavaria (Weilheim)	30 December 1998	55	Cancer
Gert Willner	CDU	Schleswig-Holstein	23 March 2000	59	
Ilse Schumann	SPD	Saxony-Anhalt (Dessau-Bitterfeld)	9 August 2000	61	
Fred Gebhardt	PDS	Hesse	15 August 2000	72	
Werner Schuster	SPD	Hesse	10 May 2001	62	Cancer
Kristin Heyne	Greens	Hamburg	30 January 2002	49	Cancer
Dietmar Schlee	CDU	Baden-Württemberg (Zollernalb–Sigmaringen)	3 August 2002	64	
Jürgen Möllemann	Independent	North Rhine-Westphalia	5 June 2003	57	Skydiving incident
Marita Sehn	FDP	Rhineland-Palatinate	18 January 2004	48	Struck by a car
Anke Hartnagel	SPD	Hamburg (Hamburg North)	17 April 2004	62	Cancer
Matthias Weisheit	SPD	Baden-Württemberg	17 May 2004	58	Heart attack
Günter Rexrodt	FDP	Berlin	19 August 2004	62	Complications from throat surgery
Hans Büttner	SPD	Bavaria	18 September 2004	59	Heart attack
Dagmar Schmidt	SPD	North Rhine-Westphalia	9 November 2005	57	Brain tumor
Johann-Henrich Krummacher	CDU	Baden-Württemberg (Stuttgart I)	25 February 2008	61	
Hermann Scheer	SPD	Baden-Württemberg	14 October 2010	66	
Jürgen Hermmann	CDU	North Rhine-Westphalia (Höxter–Lippe II)	11 August 2012	49	Heart failure
Ottmar Schreiner	SPD	Saarland	6 April 2013	66	Bladder cancer
Max Stadler	FDP	Bavaria	12 May 2013	62	Heart attack
Andreas Schockenhoff	CDU	Baden-Württemberg (Ravensburg)	13 December 2014	57	Heart failure or heat exposure after entering a sauna
Philipp Mißfelder	CDU	North Rhine-Westphalia	13 July 2015	35	Pulmonary embolism
Peter Hintze	CDU	North Rhine-Westphalia	26 November 2016	66	Cancer
Ewald Schurer	SPD	Bavaria	3 December 2017	63	
Jimmy Schulz	FDP	Bavaria	25 November 2019	51	Pancreatic cancer
Thomas Oppermann	SPD	Lower Saxony (Göttingen)	25 October 2020	66	
Karin Strenz	CDU	Mecklenburg-Vorpommern (Ludwigslust-Parchim II – Nordwestmecklenburg II – Landkreis Rostock I)	21 March 2021	53	Heart disease
Martin Hebner	AfD	Bavaria	7 July 2021	61	Brain tumor
Ingrid Remmers	Linke	North Rhine-Westphalia	9 August 2021	56	
Axel Gehrke	AfD	Schleswig-Holstein	22 September 2021	79	Cancer
Rainer Keller	SPD	North Rhine-Westphalia (Wesel I)	22 September 2022	56	
Gero Storjohann	CDU	Schleswig-Holstein	29 January 2023	64	
Corinna Miazga	AfD	Bavaria	25 February 2023	39	Breast cancer
Wolfgang Schäuble	CDU	Baden-Württemberg (Offenburg)	26 December 2023	81	Cancer
Stephanie Aeffner	Greens	Baden-Württemberg	15 January 2025	48	
Erwin Rüddel	CDU	Rhineland-Palatinate (Neuwied)	3 February 2025	69	Pulmonary embolism
Carsten Träger	SPD	Bavaria (Fürth)	21 March 2026	52	
