= Müller-Hermann =

Müller-Hermann is a surname. Notable people with the surname include:

- Ernst Müller-Hermann (1915–1994), German politician
- Johanna Müller-Hermann (1868–1941), Austrian composer and pedagogue
