= Diether Posser =

German politician (1922–2010)

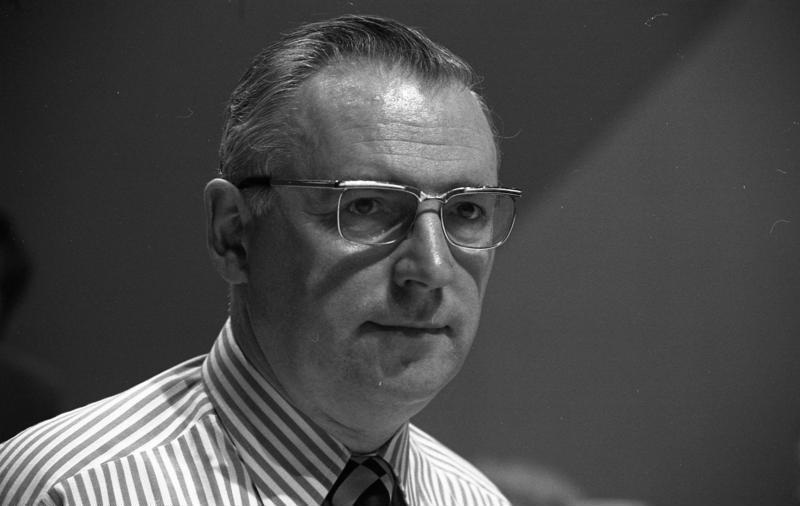
Diether Posser

Diether Posser (9 March 1922 in Essen – 9 January 2010 in Essen) was a German politician, who was a representative of the Social Democratic Party.

== Life ==
During his childhood in Essen he was influenced by the Lutheran church. After serving in the military for the required time Posser studied law and became a lawyer in 1951. In 1952 he founded, with the former Secretary of the Interior Gustav Heinemann (previously of the CDU), Hans Bodensteiner (from the CSU), Thea Arnold, Helene Wessel (both from the Zentrumspartei), Hermann Etzel (Bayernpartei), and the future President Johannes Rau the pacifist All-German People's Party, of which he was made General Secretary after the 1953 resignation of Bodensteiner.

After the party's collapse in 1957, he became a member of the SPD, for whom he joined the Landtag of North Rhine-Westphalia in 1966. In 1968 he was named the Minister for Federal Affairs. In 1972 he switched to the Judicial Department, before he became Finance Minister in 1978. He held this position until 1988 in the second and third cabinets of President Johannes Rau.

Posser was the Godfather of actor Diether Krebs.

== Works ==
- "Rapallo, nicht Tauroggen", in Stimme der Gemeinde, Issue 4, 1954, Page 87.
- "Politik ohne Solidarität", in Gesamtdeutsche Rundschau, Issue 24, 1955.
- Anwalt im Kalten Krieg. Ein Stück deutscher Geschichte in politischen Prozessen 1951–1968. Munich: C. Bertelsmann Verlag, 1991; ISBN 3-570-02347-8 (und weitere Auflagen).
- "Gustav Heinemann", in: Protestantische Profile. Lebensbilder aus fünf Jahrhunderten, ed. by Klaus Scholder and Dieter Kleinmann, Königstein/Ts. 1983, S.382–396.
- "Die Hauptsache ist, daß die Hauptsache die Hauptsache bleibt", in: Begegnungen mit Wilhelm Busch, ed. by Karl-Heinz Ehring and Ulrich Parzany, Neukirchen-Vluyn 1997, S.67–71.

== See also ==
- List of Social Democratic Party of Germany politicians
