= Carl Schröter =

Carl Schröter may refer to:

- Carl Schröter (politician) (1887–1952), German politician
- Carl Joseph Schröter (1855–1939), Swiss botanist
