= Mensing =

Mensing is a German surname. Notable people with the surname include:

- Barbara Mensing (born 1960), German archer
- Fritz Mensing (1895–1978), German politician
- Johannes Mensing (1477–1547), German Dominican theologian
- Jenny Mensing (born 1986), German swimmer
- Lucy Mensing (1901-1995), German physicist
- Simon Mensing (born 1982), footballer
- Gladys Mensing, who was a party to the PLIVA, Inc. v. Mensing case decided by the Supreme Court of the United States in 2011
