= Karl Brunner =

Karl Brunner or Carl Brunner may refer to:

- Carl Brunner von Wattenwyl (1823–1914), Swiss entomologist
- Karl Brunner (died 1867) (1796–1867), Swiss chemist
- Karl Brunner (economist) (1916–1989), Swiss economist
- Karl Brunner (luger) (born 1951), Italian Olympic luger
- Karl Brunner (politician, born 1905) (1905–1951), German politician
- Karl Brunner (SS general) (1900–1980), SS general
- Karl Brunner, chemist, co-namesake of the Einhorn–Brunner reaction
