= Johannes Handschumacher =

German politician (1887–1957)

Member of the Bundestag
- In office 21 January 1953 – 7 September 1953

Personal details
- Born: 5 July 1887
- Died: 31 October 1957 (aged 70)
- Party: CDU

Johannes Handschumacher (July 5, 1887 – October 31, 1957) was a German politician of the Christian Democratic Union (CDU) and former member of the German Bundestag.

== Life ==
After the Second World War he joined the CDU. On 21 January 1953, he moved up to the German Bundestag on the North Rhine-Westphalian state list for the retired member of parliament Franz Etzel, to which he belonged until the end of the legislative period in the same year.

== Literature ==
Herbst, Ludolf; Jahn, Bruno (2002). Vierhaus, Rudolf (ed.). Biographisches Handbuch der Mitglieder des Deutschen Bundestages. 1949–2002 [Biographical Handbook of the Members of the German Bundestag. 1949–2002] (in German). München: De Gruyter - De Gruyter Saur. p. 1715. ISBN 978-3-11-184511-1.
