= Richard Oetzel =

German politician (1901–1985)

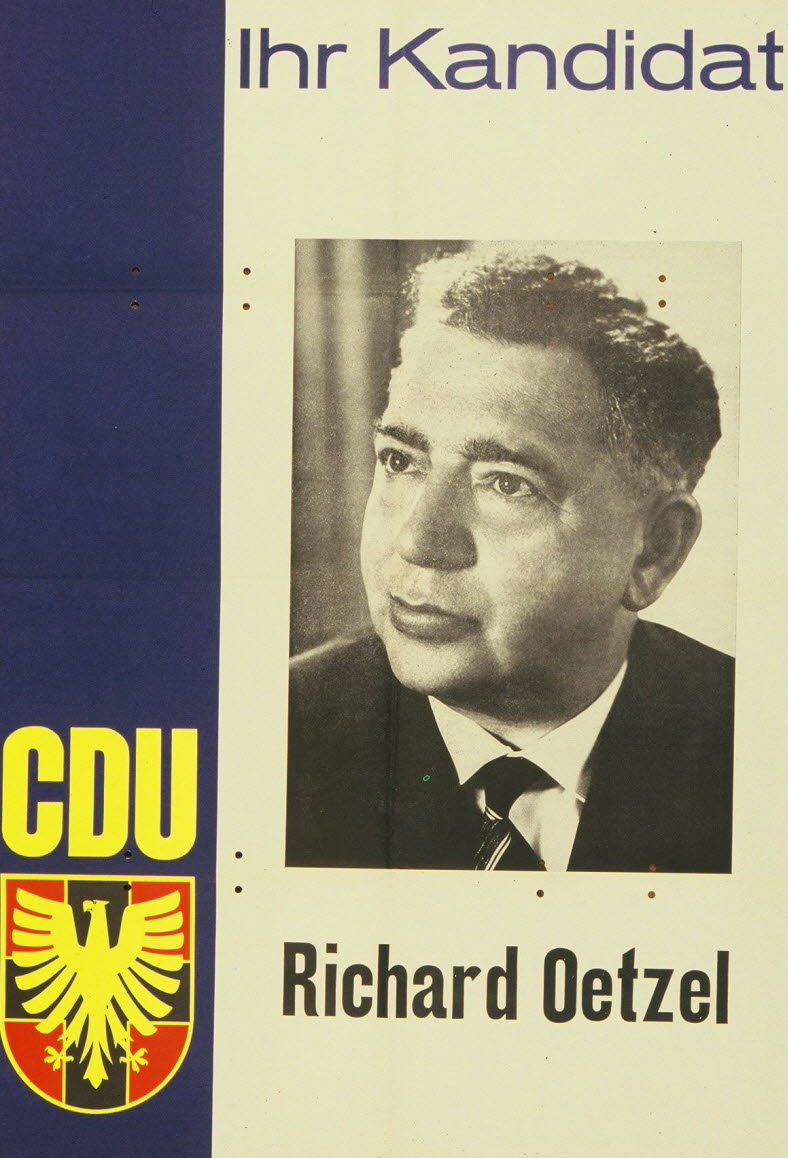

Member of the Bundestag
- In office 24 January 1953 – 17 October 1965

Personal details
- Born: 12 July 1901
- Died: 9 March 1985 (aged 83)
- Party: CDU
- Other political affiliations: Young German Order
- Occupation: Master carpenter

Richard Oetzel (July 12, 1901 – March 9, 1985) was a German master carpenter who became a politician of the Christian Democratic Union (CDU) and a member of the German Bundestag.

== Early life and education ==
Oetzel was born the son of a master carpenter. After completing elementary school, he served a trade apprenticeship and, starting in 1919, attended the Landesbaugewerkschule (state school of building trades) in Holzminden, from which he graduated in 1922 with a degree in civil engineering. Subsequently, he worked as the technical director in his father's carpentry business. In 1931, he passed the state examination to become a master carpenter. In 1940, he took over his father's business, which subsequently was completely destroyed during a bombing raid in the Second World War.

== Postwar political career ==
After the end of the war, Oetzel dedicated himself to rebuilding the business. From 1945 onwards, he served as District Master Craftsman in Witten; alongside this role, he was active in various trade organizations and served as Chief Master of the Building Trades Guild.

In his youth, Oetzel had been a member of the Young German Order in 1922. He joined the Christian Democratic Union (CDU) in 1946 and was elected to its state executive committee in Westphalia. He served as chairman of the Westphalia State Working Group on Small and Medium-Sized Enterprises and as deputy chairman of the corresponding working group within the CDU.

He was elected as a member of the Bundestag from 24 January 1953, when he succeeded the retired member Friedrich Holzapfel, until October 1965. He entered parliament in all election periods via the North Rhine-Westphalia state list.

== Sources ==
Herbst, Ludolf; Jahn, Bruno (2002). Vierhaus, Rudolf (ed.). Biographisches Handbuch der Mitglieder des Deutschen Bundestages. 1949–2002 [Biographical Handbook of the Members of the German Bundestag. 1949–2002] (in German). München: De Gruyter - De Gruyter Saur. p. 1715. ISBN 978-3-11-184511-1.
