= Heinrich Barlage =

German politician

Member of the Bundestag; for Emsland
- In office 6 October 1953 – 15 October 1957
- Preceded by: Hermann A. Eplée
- Succeeded by: Josef Stecker

Personal details
- Born: 6 December 1891 Nordhorn, Germany
- Died: 18 April 1968 (aged 76) Nordhorn, West Germany
- Party: Christian Democratic Union

Heinrich Barlage (6 December 1891 – 18 April 1968) was a German politician of the Christian Democratic Union (CDU) and former member of the German Bundestag.

== Political career ==
Barlage was elected to the council of Altendorf in 1923 and was a member of the council of the town of Nordhorn from 1929 to 1943. In 1930, the centre member was elected to the county committee of the Grafschafter Kreisausschuss (county council) on the basis of an election proposal from the centre and the SPD.

From 1953 to 1957 he was a member of the German Bundestag. He entered the Bundestag as a directly elected member of the Emsland constituency.

== Literature ==
Herbst, Ludolf; Jahn, Bruno (2002). Vierhaus, Rudolf (ed.). Biographisches Handbuch der Mitglieder des Deutschen Bundestages. 1949–2002 [Biographical Handbook of the Members of the German Bundestag. 1949–2002] (in German). München: De Gruyter - De Gruyter Saur. p. 1715. ISBN 978-3-11-184511-1.
