= Detlef Struve =

German politician

Member of the Bundestag
- In office 7 September 1949 – 22 September 1972

Personal details
- Born: 12 May 1903
- Died: 25 May 1987 (aged 84)
- Party: CDU

Detlef Struve (May 12, 1903 – May 25, 1987) was a German politician of the Christian Democratic Union (CDU) and former member of the German Bundestag.

== Life ==
Struve belonged to the district council of the district of Rendsburg and was president of this local parliament from May 1950. From 1947 to 1949, he was a member of the Economic Council for the Bizone and was a member of the German Bundestag from its first election in 1949 to 1972. There he represented the electoral district of Rendsburg and from 1965 the electoral district of Rendsburg-Neumünster. Most recently he achieved 49.4% of the first votes there.

From 1957 to 1972 Struve was deputy chairman of the CDU/CSU parliamentary group in the Bundestag.

== Literature ==
Herbst, Ludolf; Jahn, Bruno (2002). Vierhaus, Rudolf (ed.). Biographisches Handbuch der Mitglieder des Deutschen Bundestages. 1949–2002 [Biographical Handbook of the Members of the German Bundestag. 1949–2002] (in German). München: De Gruyter - De Gruyter Saur. p. 1715. ISBN 978-3-11-184511-1.
