= Walther Hasemann =

German politician (1900–1976)

Member of the Bundestag
- In office 7 September 1949 – 7 September 1953

Personal details
- Born: 18 October 1900 Leer
- Died: 20 November 1976 (aged 76)
- Party: FDP

Walther Hasemann (18 October 1900 – 20 November 1976) was a German politician of the Free Democratic Party (FDP) and former member of the German Bundestag.

== Life ==
Hasemann was a member of the German Bundestag from its first election in 1949 to 1953. He had entered parliament via the state list of the FDP Lower Saxony.

== Literature ==
Herbst, Ludolf; Jahn, Bruno (2002). Vierhaus, Rudolf (ed.). Biographisches Handbuch der Mitglieder des Deutschen Bundestages. 1949–2002 [Biographical Handbook of the Members of the German Bundestag. 1949–2002] (in German). München: De Gruyter - De Gruyter Saur. p. 1715. ISBN 978-3-11-184511-1.
