= Oscar Funcke =

German politician (1885–1965)

Member of the Bundestag
- In office 14 October 1951 – 7 September 1953

Personal details
- Born: 17 June 1885 Hagen
- Died: 6 July 1965 (aged 80)
- Party: FDP

Oscar Funcke (17 June 1885 – 6 July 1965) was a German politician of the Free Democratic Party (FDP) and former member of the German Bundestag.

== Life ==
Funcke entered the German Bundestag on 14 September 1951, when he succeeded Hermann Höpker-Aschoff as the first president of the Federal Constitutional Court. From 26 February 1953, he was deputy chairman of the Advisory Council for Trade Policy Agreements of the Bundestag. He was a member of parliament until the end of the first legislative period.

== Literature ==
Herbst, Ludolf; Jahn, Bruno (2002). Vierhaus, Rudolf (ed.). Biographisches Handbuch der Mitglieder des Deutschen Bundestages. 1949–2002 [Biographical Handbook of the Members of the German Bundestag. 1949–2002] (in German). München: De Gruyter - De Gruyter Saur. p. 1715. ISBN 978-3-11-184511-1.
