= Hermann Nuding =

German politician

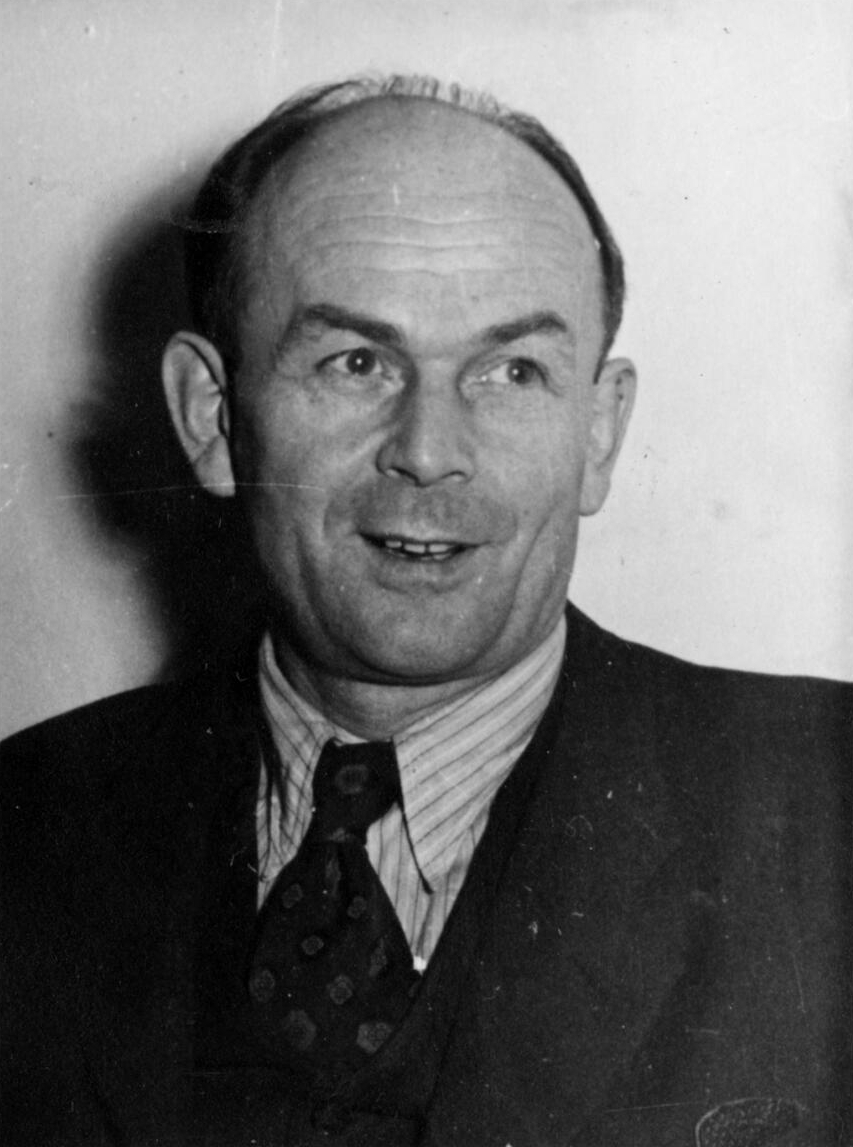
- Nuding in 1951
- Born: Hermann Christian Nuding; 3 July 1902; Oberurbach, Kingdom of Württemberg, German Empire
- Died: 30 May 1966 (aged 63); Stuttgart, Baden-Württemberg, West Germany
- Occupations: Political activist and politician Party Official
- Political party: KPD; SED
- Spouse(s): Paula Rueß/Kopp (1923–1947); Helene (1957–1966)

Hermann Nuding (3 July 1902 – 30 May 1966) was a German politician, political party official (KPD) and, after 1945, an opponent of German re-armament.

== Life ==
=== Early years ===
Nuding was born in Oberurbach, Baden-Württemberg on 3 July 1902. His father was a factory worker. An early ambition to become a teacher was thwarted by the outbreak of war when he was twelve. After leaving school in 1916 he started an apprenticeship for work in the leather and tannery industry. In 1918 he joined the German Leather workers' Trades Union and the Spartacus League which shortly thereafter became the German Communist Party (KPD) In 1919 he joined the Young Communists and became a founding member of the regional Communist Party group in Württemberg and chairman of the KPD in his home town, Oberurbach. He joined the Regional leadership of the Württemberg Young Communists in 1920. He pursued an active political career in the German communist party, which included an extended period in Moscow during 1927/28 attending the International Lenin School.

=== Exile ===
In January 1933 the NSDAP (Nazi party) took power and lost no time in embarking on the creation of a one party state in Germany. Hermann Nuding was arrested in February 1933 and remained in "protective custody" till the start of July 1934 when he emigrated initially to Switzerland, subsequently also spending more time in Moscow. In 1935 he participated, using the pseudonym "Claus Degeb" in the party's Brussels conference and then in 1935/36 worked from his base in Zürich with the illegal Communist Party across the German border in Württemberg. During the second part of the 1930s he continued to work for the German Communist Party, based for some of the period in Belgium. He served as the last head of the party's intelligence service, the Antimilitärischer Apparat.

In 1937 Hermann Nuding and Herbert Wehner were jointly commissioned by the Comintern leadership to compose a diatribe entitled "Trotskyism and Fascism". Leon Trotsky had at one time been seen by many as a likely successor of Lenin and was, by the 1930s, exiled from the Soviet Union and being systematically excoriated by the Soviet leadership and its supporters internationally.

Like many exiled German communists, by the time war broke out in 1939 he was based in France, and during 1939/1940 he was interned at Gurs. On his release he settled down to a life as a small farmer in the south of France using, appropriately, the pseudonym "Jean Bauer". During the early 1940s he worked illegally with both the French Resistance and the Soviet sponsored National Committee for a Free Germany.

=== Peace breaks out ===
After the war ended Nuding returned, in October 1945, to his home region in what remained of Germany. The northern part of Württemberg, including Stuttgart was now in the US occupation zone and formed a part of Württemberg-Baden, a state formed by the occupation forces to accommodate the division of south western German between the US military and the French military. Nuding set about rebuilding the Communist Party in Stuttgart and the surrounding region.

In 1946 he became a member of the provisional regional parliament for Württemberg-Baden and then for its successor assembly, established by the US Military administration. At this point he represented the newly formed SED (party) which had been set up in the Soviet occupation zone, although he would soon revert to the Communist Party when it became apparent that there was no future role for the SED outside that part of Germany controlled by the Soviet military.

By 1949 it was becoming apparent that West Germany and East Germany were developing as separate states, and in August 1949 Nuding was one of the fifteen Communist members of the national Bundestag, located provisionally in Bonn. He remained a member till resigning ostensibly on health grounds on 20 April 1951. Until July 1950 he spoke in the chamber on behalf of the Communist party, but by that time his expulsion from the Communist Party had already been proposed back in September 1949 by Walter Ulbricht, the leader of the newly emerging Soviet backed German Democratic Republic.

=== Disgrace and Expulsion from The Party ===
At the end of April 1945 thirty German communists, grouped in three teams of ten, arrived in what was becoming the Soviet occupation zone in Germany. The men, led by Walter Ulbricht, had spent the war years in Moscow: as matters turned, out they had used their years in exile to formulate a clear nation-building program for what would become the German Democratic Republic. German communists who had spent the war somewhere other in the Soviet Union did not necessarily share the objectives or strategy of the Ulbricht Group and during the later 1940s tensions between the Communist Party's leaders in the Bundestag, based in West Germany, and the men now governing East Germany, became increasingly apparent. In June 1950, at the Communist Party's sixteenth party conference, Nuding was condemned as the party's leading opportunist and the next month, in July 1950 he was stripped of party functions. It was reported in October 1950 that despite being seriously ill he had rejected an "urgent recommendation" to relocate to the German Democratic Republic. His resignation from the German Bundestag on health grounds in April 1951 came as the result of an instruction received from the Berlin-based SED (party).

The underlying differences that led to his resignation were numerous. Issues that triggered his disgrace by the Communist Party included his rejection of the Communist Party's official opposition to the German Trades Union Confederation (founded in Munich in 1949) and his further rejection of the party line that in the event of a war between the Soviet Union and her (former) western allies, the German Communists should actively support the Soviet Union. More generally, while there was unanimity between Nuding and the German Communist Party in opposing German rearmament in respect of West Germany, Nuding also held that rearmament of East Germany was similarly unacceptable: this was at variance with the strategy of the Ulbricht government and their Soviet backers.

Despite his exclusion from his party posts, Hermann Nuding continued to be listed as a party official till May 1955. He was excluded from party membership only on 17 August 1956, although even after this he continued to be consulted by party officials on political and trades union matters.

== Personal ==
Hermann Nuding was married twice. His first marriage to Paula Kopp lasted from 1923 till 1947. Paula then, in 1947, married Hans Rueß, and so is frequently identified in sources as Paula Rueß. Hermann Nuding's second marriage to Helene took place in 1957. Neither marriage gave rise to surviving children.

Hermann Nuding himself spent his final years in poor health as a pensioner in Luginsland (Stuttgart) where he died in December 1966.
