= Günther Serres =

German politician

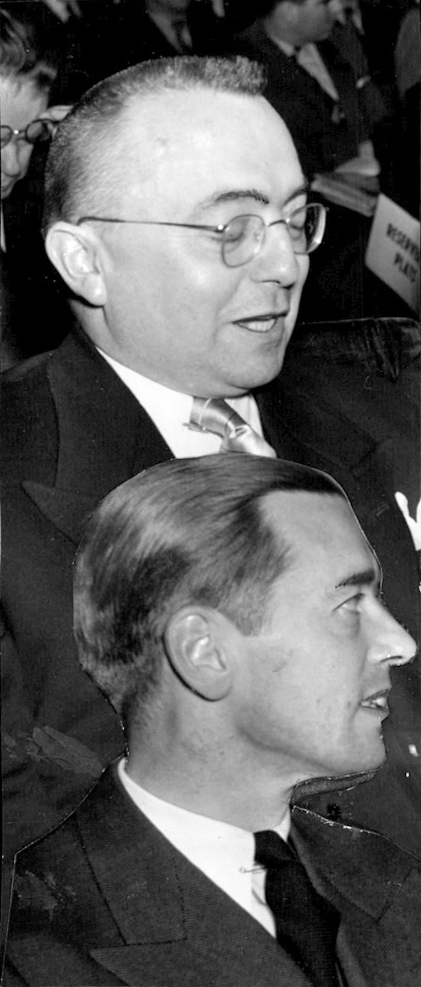
- Günther Serres (top) and Ingemar Hägglöf negotiate butter tariffs at the German-Swedish Chamber of Commerce, 1952.

Member of the Bundestag
- In office 7 September 1949 – 19 October 1969

Personal details
- Born: 18 June 1910
- Died: 26 December 1981 (aged 71)
- Party: CDU

Günther Serres (June 18, 1910 – December 26, 1981) was a German politician of the Christian Democratic Union (CDU) and former member of the German Bundestag.

== Life ==
He was a member of the German Bundestag from its first election in 1949 to 1969. He represented the constituency of Krefeld in parliament as a directly elected member of parliament.

== Literature ==
Herbst, Ludolf; Jahn, Bruno (2002). Vierhaus, Rudolf (ed.). Biographisches Handbuch der Mitglieder des Deutschen Bundestages. 1949–2002 [Biographical Handbook of the Members of the German Bundestag. 1949–2002] (in German). München: De Gruyter - De Gruyter Saur. p. 1715. ISBN 978-3-11-184511-1.
