= Paul Harig =

German politician (1900–1977)

Member of the Bundestag
- In office 7 September 1949 – 7 September 1953

Personal details
- Born: 3 July 1900 Nivilingen / Saargebiet
- Died: 24 May 1977 (aged 76)
- Party: KPD

Paul Harig (3 July 1900 – 24 May 1977) was a German politician of the Communist Party (KPD) and former member of the German Bundestag.

== Life ==
From 1949 to 1953 Harig was a member of the German Bundestag. He was elected to the Bundestag via the North Rhine-Westphalia state list.

== Literature ==
Herbst, Ludolf; Jahn, Bruno (2002). Vierhaus, Rudolf (ed.). Biographisches Handbuch der Mitglieder des Deutschen Bundestages. 1949–2002 [Biographical Handbook of the Members of the German Bundestag. 1949–2002] (in German). München: De Gruyter - De Gruyter Saur. p. 1715. ISBN 978-3-11-184511-1.
