= Hugo Mayer (politician, born 1899) =

German politician

Member of the Bundestag
- In office 7 September 1949 – 6 October 1957

Personal details
- Born: 21 January 1899
- Died: 22 August 1968 (aged 69)
- Party: CDU

Hugo Mayer (January 1, 1899 – August 22, 1968) was a German politician of the Christian Democratic Union (CDU) and former member of the German Bundestag.

== Life ==
In the first and second legislative periods (1949-1957), he represented the Bad Kreuznach / Birkenfeld constituency in the Bundestag as a directly elected member. During both terms of office he was a full member of the Committee on Petitions. In the first term of office he was also a full member of the Committee for Social Policy.

== Literature ==
Herbst, Ludolf; Jahn, Bruno (2002). Vierhaus, Rudolf (ed.). Biographisches Handbuch der Mitglieder des Deutschen Bundestages. 1949–2002 [Biographical Handbook of the Members of the German Bundestag. 1949–2002] (in German). München: De Gruyter - De Gruyter Saur. p. 1715. ISBN 978-3-11-184511-1.
