= Helmut Bertram =

German politician (1910–1981)

Member of the Bundestag
- In office 3 November 1949 – 7 September 1953

Personal details
- Born: 20 March 1910 Soest, German Empire
- Died: 27 January 1981 (aged 70) Soest, West Germany
- Party: FU

Helmut Bertram (20 March 1910 – 27 January 1981) was a German politician of the Federalist Union and former member of the German Bundestag.

== Life ==
He was a member of the German Bundestag from 3 November 1949, when he succeeded Rudolf Amelunxen, until the end of the first term for the Centre Party, which from 14 December 1951 formed a parliamentary group with the Bavarian Party under the name of the Federalist Union. From 16 July 1952 to 10 December 1953 he was a member of the European Parliament for CDU.

== Literature ==
Herbst, Ludolf; Jahn, Bruno (2002). Vierhaus, Rudolf (ed.). Biographisches Handbuch der Mitglieder des Deutschen Bundestages. 1949–2002 [Biographical Handbook of the Members of the German Bundestag. 1949–2002] (in German). München: De Gruyter - De Gruyter Saur. p. 1715. ISBN 978-3-11-184511-1.
