= Karl Kern =

German politician

Member of the Bundestag
- In office 7 September 1949 – 7 September 1953

Personal details
- Born: 18 May 1900
- Died: 14 October 1974 (aged 74)
- Party: CDU

Karl Kern (18 May 1900 – 14 October 1974) was a German politician of the Christian Democratic Union (CDU) and former member of the German Bundestag.

== Life ==
Kern joined the CDU in 1949, and by 1948 he had already returned to the Kirchhausen municipal council. From 1948 he also sat in the Heilbronn district council. In the first legislative period from 1949 to 1953 he was a member of the German Bundestag. In Parliament he was a full member of the Committee on Transport and the Committee on Postal and Telecommunications Affair

== Literature ==
Herbst, Ludolf; Jahn, Bruno (2002). Vierhaus, Rudolf (ed.). Biographisches Handbuch der Mitglieder des Deutschen Bundestages. 1949–2002 [Biographical Handbook of the Members of the German Bundestag. 1949–2002] (in German). München: De Gruyter - De Gruyter Saur. p. 1715. ISBN 978-3-11-184511-1.
