= Ernst Majonica =

German politician (1920–1972)

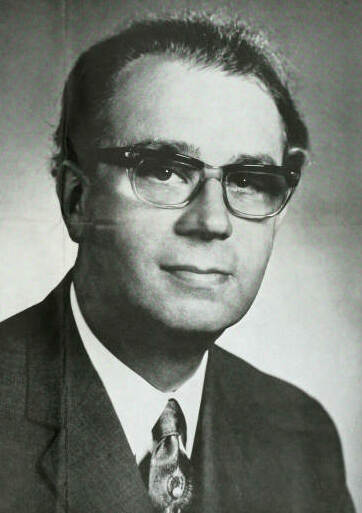

Member of the Bundestag
- In office 19 November 1950 – 22 September 1972

Personal details
- Born: 29 October 1920
- Died: 21 July 1997 (aged 76)
- Party: CDU

Ernst Majonica (29 October 1920 – 21 July 1997) was a German politician of the Christian Democratic Union (CDU) and former member of the German Bundestag.

== Life ==
Majonica joined the CDU and the Junge Union (JU) in 1946. From 1950 to 1955, he was the national chairman of the JU. Majonica was a member of the German Bundestag from 19 November 1950, succeeding Heinrich Lübke, until 1972. He represented the constituency of Arnsberg - Soest in parliament as a member of parliament who was always directly elected. Between 1979 and 1984, he was a member of the first directly elected European Parliament. Majonica was an outspoken supporter of the German NATO membership.

== Literature ==
Herbst, Ludolf; Jahn, Bruno (2002). Vierhaus, Rudolf (ed.). Biographisches Handbuch der Mitglieder des Deutschen Bundestages. 1949–2002 [Biographical Handbook of the Members of the German Bundestag. 1949–2002] (in German). München: De Gruyter - De Gruyter Saur. p. 1715. ISBN 978-3-11-184511-1.
