= Rudolf Freidhof =

German politician (1888–1983)

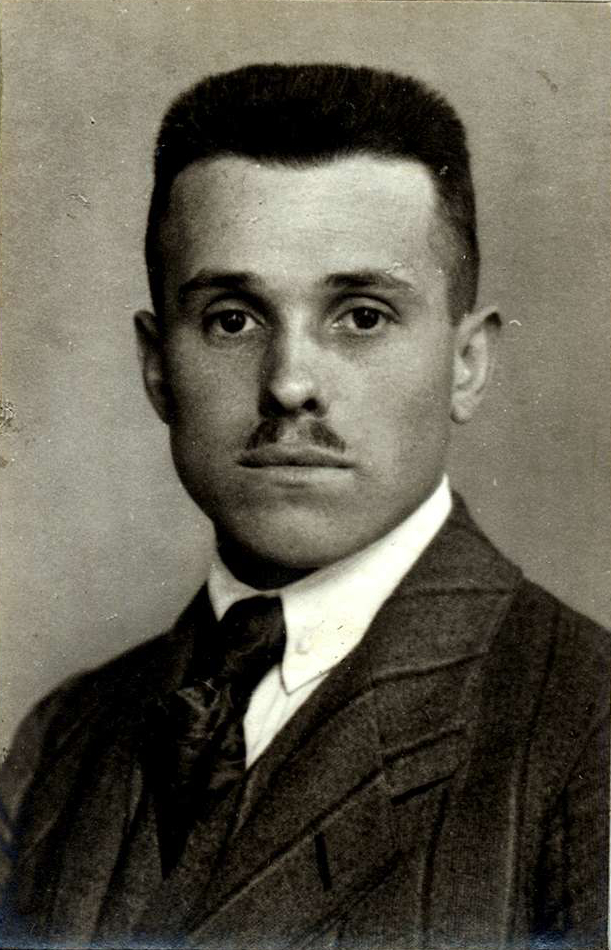
- Rudolf Freidhof (around 1921)

Member of the Bundestag
- In office 7 September 1949 – 6 October 1957

Personal details
- Born: 23 September 1888 Gerlachsheim
- Died: 25 December 1983 (aged 95)
- Party: SPD

Rudolf Freidhof (23 September 1888 – 25 December 1983) was a German politician of the Social Democratic Party (SPD) and a member of the German Bundestag.

== Life ==
After 1945, Freidhof was a member of the SPD and of the State Assembly of Hesse, which advised on the constitution. From 1946 to 1949 he was a member of the Hessian State Parliament and from 1946 to 1947 chairman of the SPD state parliamentary group. Freidhof was a member of the Bundestag from 1949 to 1957, elected directly in the Eschwege constituency.

== Literature ==
Herbst, Ludolf; Jahn, Bruno (2002). Vierhaus, Rudolf (ed.). Biographisches Handbuch der Mitglieder des Deutschen Bundestages. 1949–2002 [Biographical Handbook of the Members of the German Bundestag. 1949–2002] (in German). München: De Gruyter - De Gruyter Saur. p. 1715. ISBN 978-3-11-184511-1.
