= Siegfried Bärsch =

German politician (1920–2008)

Member of the Bundestag
- In office 7 September 1949 – 15 October 1961

Personal details
- Born: 14 February 1920 Frankenberg, Saxony
- Died: 1 September 2008 (aged 88)
- Party: SPD

Siegfried Bärsch (14 February 1920 – 1 September 2008) was a German politician of the Social Democratic Party (SPD) and former member of the German Bundestag.

== Life ==
He won a direct mandate in the (first) federal election in 1949, in the Bremen-West constituency. He was able to defend it in the 1953 Bundestag elections and the 1957 Bundestag elections.

== Literature ==
Herbst, Ludolf; Jahn, Bruno (2002). Vierhaus, Rudolf (ed.). Biographisches Handbuch der Mitglieder des Deutschen Bundestages. 1949–2002 [Biographical Handbook of the Members of the German Bundestag. 1949–2002] (in German). München: De Gruyter - De Gruyter Saur. p. 1715. ISBN 978-3-11-184511-1.
