= Emil Bettgenhäuser =

German politician (1906–1982)

Member of the Bundestag
- In office 7 September 1949 – 15 October 1961

Personal details
- Born: 31 October 1906 Flammersfeld
- Died: 9 November 1982 (aged 76)
- Party: SPD

Emil Bettgenhäuser (October 31, 1906 – November 9, 1982) was a German politician of the Social Democratic Party (SPD) and member of the German Bundestag.

== Life ==
In 1946/47, Bettgenhäuser was a member of the Consultative State Assembly of Rhineland-Palatinate and deputy chairman of the SPD parliamentary group there. From 1947 until his resignation on 30 September 1949, he was a member of the Rhineland-Palatinate state parliament. There he was also deputy chairman of the parliamentary group and was a member of the Council of Elders, the Committee on Rules of Procedure, the Economic and Transport Committee and the Interim Committee.

He was a member of the German Bundestag from its first election in 1949 to 1961.

== Literature ==
Herbst, Ludolf; Jahn, Bruno (2002). Vierhaus, Rudolf (ed.). Biographisches Handbuch der Mitglieder des Deutschen Bundestages. 1949–2002 [Biographical Handbook of the Members of the German Bundestag. 1949–2002] (in German). München: De Gruyter - De Gruyter Saur. p. 1715. ISBN 978-3-11-184511-1.
