= Carl von Campe =

German politician (1894–1977)

Member of the Bundestag
- In office 23 January 1950 – 8 January 1952

Personal details
- Born: 16 April 1894 Hildesheim
- Died: 8 September 1977 (aged 83)
- Party: DP

Carl Campe (16 August 1894 – 8 September 1977) was a German politician of the German Party (DP) and former member of the German Bundestag.

== Life ==
He was a member of the German Bundestag from 23 January 1950, when he succeeded his late party friend Friedrich Klinge, until 8 January 1952. He resigned his mandate to become the first Ambassador of the Federal Republic of Germany to Chile.

== Literature ==
Herbst, Ludolf; Jahn, Bruno (2002). Vierhaus, Rudolf (ed.). Biographisches Handbuch der Mitglieder des Deutschen Bundestages. 1949–2002 [Biographical Handbook of the Members of the German Bundestag. 1949–2002] (in German). München: De Gruyter - De Gruyter Saur. p. 1715. ISBN 978-3-11-184511-1.
