= Walter Faller =

German politician (1909–2003)

Member of the Bundestag
- In office 4 December 1951 – 22 September 1972

Member of the European Parliament
- In office 29 November 1961 – 14 February 1973

Personal details
- Born: 11 November 1909 Frankeneck
- Died: 3 February 2003 (aged 93)
- Party: SPD

Walter Faller (11 November 1909 – 3 February 2003) was a German politician of the Social Democratic Party (SPD) and member of the German Bundestag.

== Life ==
Faller was a member of the Bundestag from 4 December 1951, when he succeeded Gustav Herbig as ambassador, until 1972. He entered parliament via his party's state list for Baden-Württemberg in all federal elections between 1953 and 1969. He was also a member of the European Parliament from 29 November 1961 to 14 February 1973.

== Literature ==
Herbst, Ludolf; Jahn, Bruno (2002). Vierhaus, Rudolf (ed.). Biographisches Handbuch der Mitglieder des Deutschen Bundestages. 1949–2002 [Biographical Handbook of the Members of the German Bundestag. 1949–2002] (in German). München: De Gruyter - De Gruyter Saur. p. 1715. ISBN 978-3-11-184511-1.
