= Bernard Povel =

German politician (1897–1952)

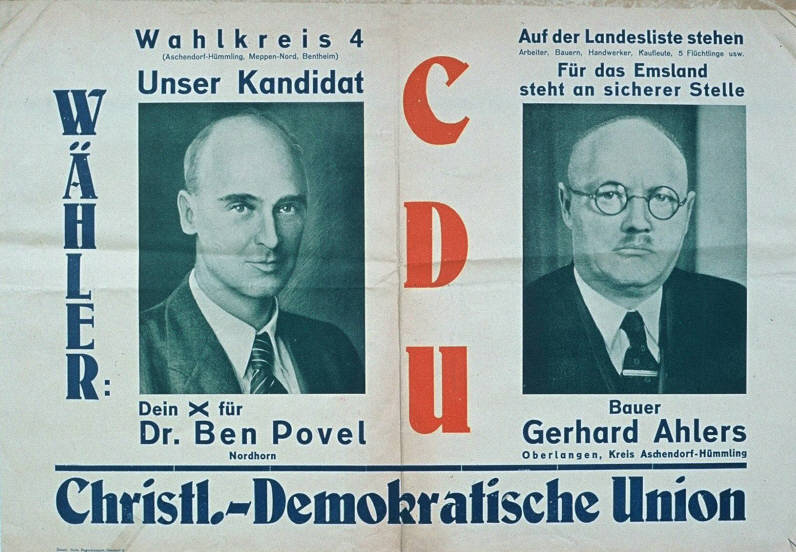
- Image of Ben Povel on a Federal Election poster

Member of the Bundestag; for Emsland
- In office 7 September 1949 – 21 October 1952
- Preceded by: Constituency established
- Succeeded by: Hermann A. Eplée

Personal details
- Born: 28 August 1897 Amsterdam, Netherlands
- Died: 21 October 1952 (aged 55) Munich, West Germany
- Party: Christian Democratic Union
- Education: University of Cologne

Bernardus Povel (28 August 1897 – 21 October 1952) was a German politician of the Christian Democratic Union (CDU) and former member of the German Bundestag.

== Political career ==
In the election to the first Bundestag in 1949, Povel won the mandate of the Emsland constituency.

== Literature ==
Herbst, Ludolf; Jahn, Bruno (2002). Vierhaus, Rudolf (ed.). Biographisches Handbuch der Mitglieder des Deutschen Bundestages. 1949–2002 [Biographical Handbook of the Members of the German Bundestag. 1949–2002] (in German). München: De Gruyter - De Gruyter Saur. p. 1715. ISBN 978-3-11-184511-1.
