= Maria Ansorge =

German politician (1880–1955)

Member of the Bundestag
- In office 17 November 1951 – 7 September 1953

Personal details
- Born: 15 December 1880 Löchau
- Died: 11 July 1955 (aged 74) Dorsten, North Rhine-Westphalia, Germany
- Party: SPD

Maria Ansorge (15 December 1880 – 11 July 1955) was a German politician of the Social Democratic Party (SPD) and former member of the German Bundestag.

== Life ==
She was a member of the First Federal Assembly and was a member of the German Bundestag from 17 November 1951, when she succeeded her late party colleague Karl Brunner, until 1953.

== Literature ==
Herbst, Ludolf; Jahn, Bruno (2002). Vierhaus, Rudolf (ed.). Biographisches Handbuch der Mitglieder des Deutschen Bundestages. 1949–2002 [Biographical Handbook of the Members of the German Bundestag. 1949–2002] (in German). München: De Gruyter - De Gruyter Saur. p. 1715. ISBN 978-3-11-184511-1.
