= Agnes Katharina Maxsein =

German politician (1904–1991)

Member of the Bundestag
- In office 1 February 1952 – 19 October 1969

Personal details
- Born: 4 December 1904
- Died: 31 October 1991 (aged 86)
- Party: CDU

Agnes Katharina Maxsein (4 December 1904 – 31 October 1991) was a German politician of the Christian Democratic Union (CDU) and former member of the German Bundestag.

== Life ==
Maxsein participated in the founding of the CDU Berlin and was its deputy state chairman from 1946 to 1948. From 1946 to 1952 Maxsein was a member of the Berlin state parliament. From 1949 to 1952 she was vice president of the Chamber of Deputies. With the increase in the number of Berlin deputies on February 1, 1952, Maxsein entered the German Bundestag, of which she was a member until 1969.

== Literature ==
Herbst, Ludolf; Jahn, Bruno (2002). Vierhaus, Rudolf (ed.). Biographisches Handbuch der Mitglieder des Deutschen Bundestages. 1949–2002 [Biographical Handbook of the Members of the German Bundestag. 1949–2002] (in German). München: De Gruyter - De Gruyter Saur. p. 1715. ISBN 978-3-11-184511-1.
