= Johannes Hagge =

German politician (1893–1964)

Member of the Bundestag
- In office 7 September 1949 – 7 September 1953

Personal details
- Born: 4 May 1893
- Died: 10 January 1964 (aged 70)
- Party: CDU

Johannes Hagge (4 May 1893 – 10 January 1964) was a German politician of the Christian Democratic Union (CDU) and former member of the German Bundestag.

== Life ==
From 1946 to 1950 Hagge was a member of the state parliament in Schleswig-Holstein, where he represented the constituency of Schleswig-South. In 1948 he became District Administrator in the Schleswig district.

He was a member of the German Bundestag in its first legislative period (1949 to 1953), as a directly elected member of parliament in the constituency of Schleswig-Eckernförde. Originally elected for the CDU, he joined the FDP on 17 June 1953.

== Literature ==
Herbst, Ludolf; Jahn, Bruno (2002). Vierhaus, Rudolf (ed.). Biographisches Handbuch der Mitglieder des Deutschen Bundestages. 1949–2002 [Biographical Handbook of the Members of the German Bundestag. 1949–2002] (in German). München: De Gruyter - De Gruyter Saur. p. 1715. ISBN 978-3-11-184511-1.
