= Walter Bartram =

German politician (1893–1971)

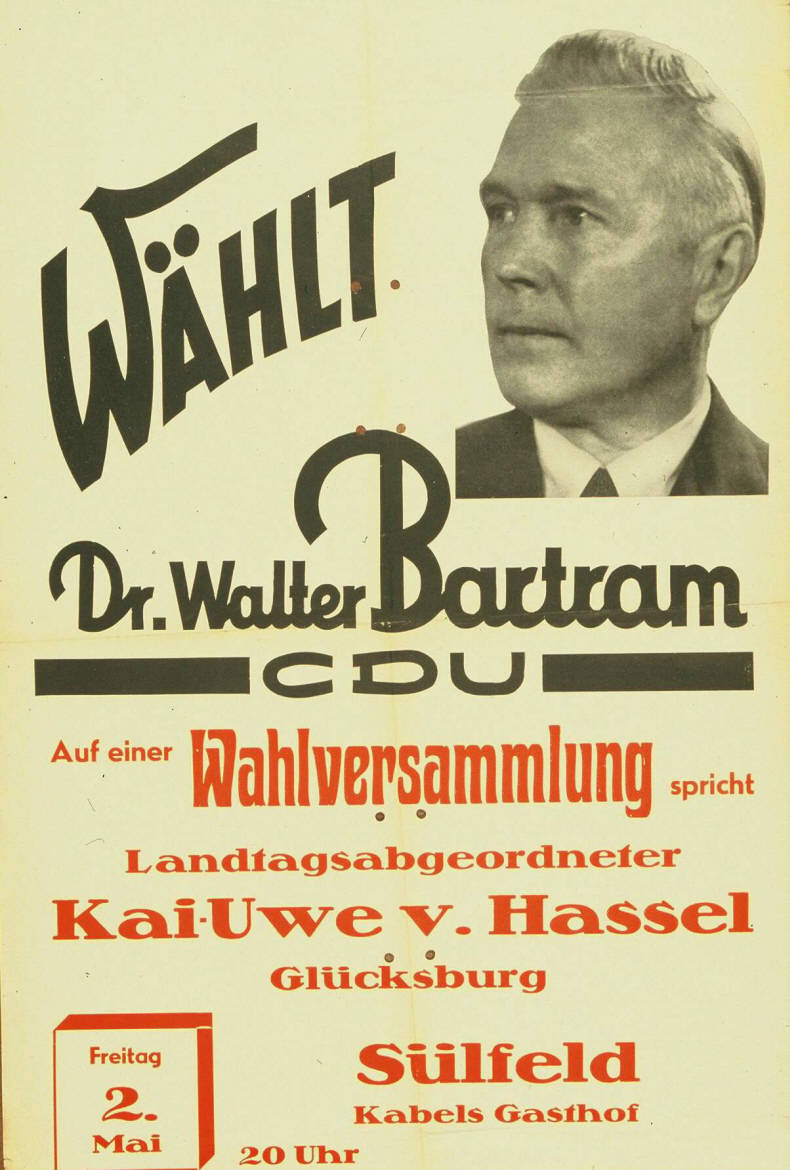
- Walter Bartram on an election poster 1952

Minister President of Schleswig-Holstein
- In office 5 September 1950 – 25 June 1951
- President: Theodor Heuss
- Chancellor: Konrad Adenauer
- Deputy: Waldemar Kraft
- Preceded by: Bruno Diekmann
- Succeeded by: Friedrich Wilhelm Lübke

Member of the Bundestag
- In office 13 May 1952 – 6 October 1957

Personal details
- Born: 21 April 1893 Neumünster
- Died: 29 September 1971 (aged 78) Latendorf, Schleswig-Holstein, Germany
- Party: CDU

Walter Bartram (21 April 1893 – 29 September 1971) was a German politician of the Christian Democratic Union (CDU) and former member of the German Bundestag.

== Life ==
On 5 September 1950 Walter Bartram was elected Prime Minister of Schleswig-Holstein in a coalition with the BHE, FDP and DP.

Bartram became a member of the CDU in 1946. He was district chairman of the CDU in Neumünster. On 4 May 1952 he succeeded Carl Schröter (CDU) in the German Bundestag. He was then a member of the German Bundestag until 1957, representing the constituency of Segeberg - Neumünster.

== Literature ==
Herbst, Ludolf; Jahn, Bruno (2002). Vierhaus, Rudolf (ed.). Biographisches Handbuch der Mitglieder des Deutschen Bundestages. 1949–2002 [Biographical Handbook of the Members of the German Bundestag. 1949–2002] (in German). München: De Gruyter - De Gruyter Saur. p. 1715. ISBN 978-3-11-184511-1.
