= Wilhelm Bahlburg =

German politician (1888–1958)

Member of the Bundestag
- In office 7 September 1949 – 7 September 1953

Personal details
- Born: 27 October 1888 Jesteburg
- Died: 17 February 1958 (aged 69)
- Party: DP

Wilhelm Bahlburg (27 October 1888 – 17 February 1958) was a German politician of the German Party (DP) and former member of the German Bundestag.

== Life ==
From 1949 to 1953 he was a member of the German Bundestag for the constituency of Harburg - Soltau. He died in Buchholz in der Nordheide.

== Literature ==
Herbst, Ludolf; Jahn, Bruno (2002). Vierhaus, Rudolf (ed.). Biographisches Handbuch der Mitglieder des Deutschen Bundestages. 1949–2002 [Biographical Handbook of the Members of the German Bundestag. 1949–2002] (in German). München: De Gruyter - De Gruyter Saur. p. 1715. ISBN 978-3-11-184511-1.
