= Heinrich Glasmeyer =

German politician (1893–1974)

Member of the Bundestag
- In office 7 September 1949 – 6 October 1957

Personal details
- Born: 4 April 1893 Steinbeck, Province of Westphalia, Kingdom of Prussia, German Empire
- Died: 2 January 1974 (aged 80) Rheine, North Rhine-Westphalia, West Germany
- Party: Centre Party; CDU

Heinrich Glasmeyer (April 4, 1893 – January 2, 1974) was a German politician of the Centre Party and, later, the Christian Democratic Union (CDU). During the Weimar Republic, he was elected to the provincial parliament of the Province of Westphalia but was removed from this seat after the Nazi seizure of power. After the end of the Second World War, he returned to political life and was elected to the Bundestag where he served from 1949 to 1957.

== Early life, education and entry into politics ==
Glasmeyer was born in the village of Steinbeck, part of the municipality of Recke in Westphalia. He completed an apprenticeship as a journeyman baker. He then obtained his Abitur and volunteered for military service in World War I, serving from 1914 to 1918. After the war ended, he studyied political science and Catholic theology. In 1919, Glasmeyer joined the Catholic-oriented Centre Party. From 1922 onward, he worked as an independent farmer and earned a doctorate in 1926 with a dissertation on Bourgeois Society and Religion. He was elected as a deputy to the provincial parliament of the Province of Westphalia in the election of March 1933, but lost his seat after only a few months when the Nazi Party enacted a law banning all other political parties.

== Post-war return to politics ==
Glasmeyer returned to political activity in West Germany. In the 1949 federal elections, he was elected as a member of the Bundestag via the North Rhine-Westphalia state list for the Centre Party. He was a full member of the Committee for the Protection of the Constitution, the Committee for Equalization of Burdens and the Committee for ERP Issues. On 23 November 1951, he left the parliamentary group of the Centre Party and joined the Christian Democratic Union (CDU), for which he entered parliament in the 1953 federal elections, also via the North Rhine-Westphalia state list, and served until 1957.

== Sources ==
Herbst, Ludolf; Jahn, Bruno (2002). Vierhaus, Rudolf (ed.). Biographisches Handbuch der Mitglieder des Deutschen Bundestages. 1949–2002 [Biographical Handbook of the Members of the German Bundestag. 1949–2002] (in German). München: De Gruyter - De Gruyter Saur. p. 1715. ISBN 978-3-11-184511-1.
