= Hermann A. Eplée =

German politician (1908–1973)

Member of the Bundestag
- In office 8 September 1958 – 17 October 1961
- Preceded by: Franz Meyers
- Succeeded by: Edmund Sinn
- Constituency: Aachen-Stadt
- In office 16 January 1953 – 6 October 1953
- Preceded by: Bernard Povel
- Succeeded by: Heinrich Barlage
- Constituency: Emsland

Personal details
- Born: 5 December 1908 Mitau, Russian Empire
- Died: 30 April 1973 (aged 64)
- Party: Christian Democratic Union

Hermann A. Eplée (5 December 1908 – 30 April 1973) was a German politician of the Christian Democratic Union (CDU) and former member of the German Bundestag.

== Political career ==
Eplée had been a member of the CDU since 1947. Until 1952 he was chairman of the Committee of Expellees of Lower Saxony and from 1954 to 1958 chairman of the CDU regional association Oder/Neisse, a party-internal organization of expellees. He was a member of the German Bundestag from 16 January 1953, when he succeeded the late Bernardus Povel, until the end of the legislative period a few months later, and again from 8 September 1958, when he succeeded Franz Meyers, who left the Bundestag after his election as Prime Minister of North Rhine-Westphalia. After the end of the legislative period in 1961, Eplée was no longer represented in the Bundestag.

== Literature ==
Herbst, Ludolf; Jahn, Bruno (2002). Vierhaus, Rudolf (ed.). Biographisches Handbuch der Mitglieder des Deutschen Bundestages. 1949–2002 [Biographical Handbook of the Members of the German Bundestag. 1949–2002] (in German). München: De Gruyter - De Gruyter Saur. p. 1715. ISBN 978-3-11-184511-1.
