= Ernst Müller-Hermann =

German politician (1915 – 1994)

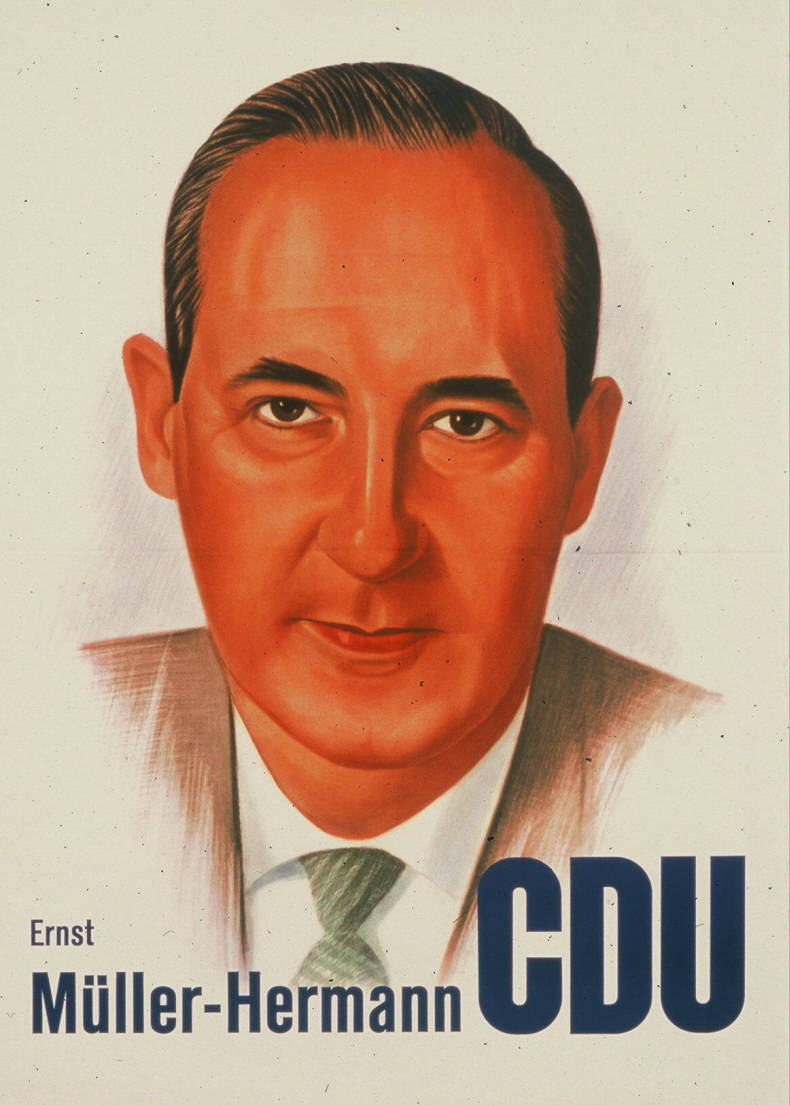
- Ernst Müller-Hermann on a campaign poster for the 1961 federal elections

Member of the Bundestag
- In office 1 January 1952 – 4 November 1980

Personal details
- Born: 30 September 1915
- Died: 19 July 1994 (aged 78)
- Party: CDU

Ernst Müller-Hermann (September 30, 1915 – July 19, 1994) was a German politician of the Christian Democratic Union (CDU) and former member of the German Bundestag.

== Life ==
He became a member of the CDU as early as 1946. From 1946 to 1948, he was state managing director, and from 1968 to 1974 he was state chairman of the Bremen CDU.

From 1946 to 1952, Müller-Hermann was a member of the Bremen State Parliament and from 1950 to 1952 Chairman of the CDU parliamentary group.

He was a member of the German Bundestag from January 1, 1952, when he succeeded Johannes Degener, until 1980. He was elected to parliament in all electoral periods via the CDU's Bremen national list. From 1957 to 1965 he was Deputy Chairman of the Bundestag Committee on Transport, Post and Telecommunications, and from 1965 to 1969 of the Transport Committee. From 13 June 1967 to 1969 he was Deputy Chairman of the CDU/CSU parliamentary group in the Bundestag and from 1969 to 1976 Chairman of the Economics and Food Working Group of the CDU/CSU parliamentary group.

He was a member of the European Parliament from 27 February 1958 to 21 December 1965 and from 19 January 1977 to 1984.

== Literature ==
Herbst, Ludolf; Jahn, Bruno (2002). Vierhaus, Rudolf (ed.). Biographisches Handbuch der Mitglieder des Deutschen Bundestages. 1949–2002 [Biographical Handbook of the Members of the German Bundestag. 1949–2002] (in German). München: De Gruyter - De Gruyter Saur. p. 1715. ISBN 978-3-11-184511-1.
