= Wilhelm Fischer (politician) =

German politician (1904–1951)

Willy Fischer

Member of the Bundestag for Bavaria
- In office 7 September 1949 – 21 October 1951
- Constituency: Nuremberg-Fürth

Personal details
- Born: 26 March 1904 Fürth, Bavaria, German Empire
- Died: 21 October 1951 (aged 47)
- Party: SPD

Wilhelm "Willy" Fischer (26 March 1904 – 21 October 1951) was a German politician from the Social Democratic Party (SPD) and a member of the German Bundestag.

== Life ==
In 1946, Fischer was a member of the Constituent State Assembly in Bavaria, and from 1946 until his entry into the German Bundestag he was a member of the Bavarian Landtag. In the first Bundestag elections of 1949, he was elected to parliament from the constituency of Nuremberg-Fürth and represented it until his death in 1951.

== Literature ==
Herbst, Ludolf; Jahn, Bruno (2002). Vierhaus, Rudolf (ed.). Biographisches Handbuch der Mitglieder des Deutschen Bundestages. 1949–2002 [Biographical Handbook of the Members of the German Bundestag. 1949–2002] (in German). München: De Gruyter - De Gruyter Saur. p. 1715. ISBN 978-3-11-184511-1.
