= Johannes Degener =

German politician (1889–1959)

Member of the Bundestag
- In office 7 September 1949 – 31 December 1951

Personal details
- Born: 14 September 1889 Bremen
- Died: 13 February 1959 (aged 69) Bremen, Germany
- Party: CDU

Johannes Degener (September 14, 1889 – February 13, 1959) was a German politician of the Christian Democratic Union (CDU) and former member of the German Bundestag.

== Life ==
In 1946, he became a member of the CDU and was the state manager from 1946 to 1947, and from 1946 to 1 October 1949, he was a member of the Bremische Bürgerschaft, where he had been chairman of the CDU parliamentary group since 1947.

He was a member of the German Bundestag from the first election in 1949 until 31 December 1951.

== Literature ==
Herbst, Ludolf; Jahn, Bruno (2002). Vierhaus, Rudolf (ed.). Biographisches Handbuch der Mitglieder des Deutschen Bundestages. 1949–2002 [Biographical Handbook of the Members of the German Bundestag. 1949–2002] (in German). München: De Gruyter - De Gruyter Saur. p. 1715. ISBN 978-3-11-184511-1.
