= Fritz Mensing =

German politician (1895–1978)

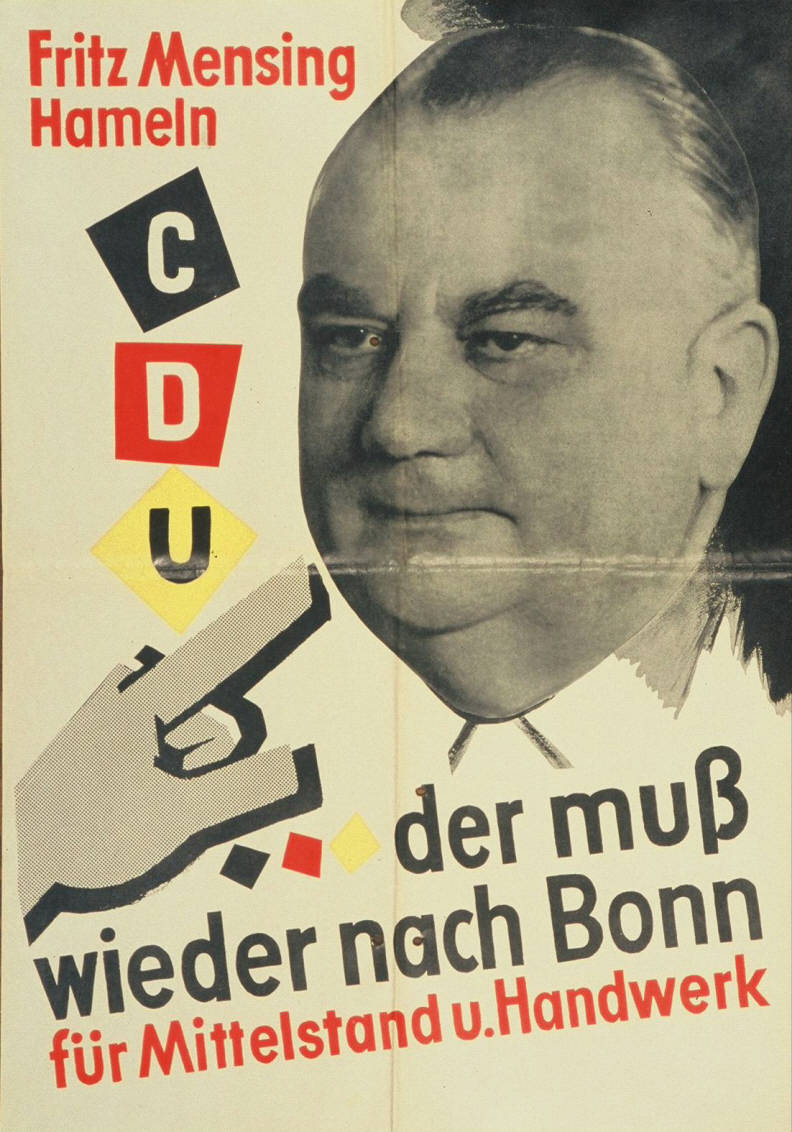
- Mensing on a campaign poster for the 1957 federal elections

Member of the Bundestag
- In office 7 September 1949 – 15 October 1961

Hanover Provincial Landtag Deputy
- In office 29 November 1925 – 14 October 1933

Personal details
- Born: 25 April 1895 Hamelin, Province of Hanover, Kingdom of Prussia, German Empire
- Died: 2 November 1978 (aged 83) Hamelin, Lower Saxony, West Germany
- Party: Economic Party; CDU
- Occupation: Butcher

Friedrich "Fritz" Mensing (25 April 1895 – 2 November 1978) was a German politician who served as a deputy in the provincial parliament of the Province of Hanover as a member of the Economic Party during the Weimar Republic. Politically inactive during Nazi Germany, in post-war West Germany he was elected to the first three Bundestag as a representative of the Christian Democratic Union (CDU).

== Early life and career in the Weimar Republic ==
Mensing was born in Hamelin and, after graduating from the local Gymnasium, completed an apprenticeship as a butcher. After passing his master craftsman's examination, he took over his father's business in Hamelin in 1924 and was a member of the board of the Northwest German Craftsmen's Association. During the Weimar Republic, Mensing was politically active as a member of the conservative Economic Party, also known as the Reich Party of the German Middle Class (German: Reichspartei des deutschen Mittelstandes). He represented the party as a deputy in the provincial parliament of the Province of Hanover from 1925 to 1933. After the Nazi seizure of power, all other parties were outlawed. Throughout the duration of Nazi Germany from 1933 to 1945, Mensing was not politically active and held no political office.

== Post-war life in West Germany ==
After the fall of the Nazi regime in 1945, Mensing reentered politics, and served for a time on the Hamelin city council. He became chairman of the German Butchers' Association and a member of the presidium of the Central Association of German Crafts, as well as holding other positions in craft organizations. He joined the Christian Democratic Union of Germany (CDU) and was elected to the first West German Bundestag in 1949. He was reelected in 1953 and 1957 and served until 1961, entering parliament in each election via the Lower Saxony state list of the CDU. Mensing was a member of the Committee on Food, Agriculture, and Forestry. He was also chairman of the supervisory board of the Volksbank Hameln (a cooperative bank), the main cooperative of the butchery trade. In 1968, he was honored by the German Agricultural Society for exceptional services to the German meat industry. Mensing died in Hamelin in November 1978.

== Sources ==
Herbst, Ludolf; Jahn, Bruno (2002). Vierhaus, Rudolf (ed.). Biographisches Handbuch der Mitglieder des Deutschen Bundestages. 1949–2002 [Biographical Handbook of the Members of the German Bundestag. 1949–2002] (in German). München: De Gruyter - De Gruyter Saur. p. 1715. ISBN 978-3-11-184511-1.
