= Thea Arnold =

German politician (1882–1966)

Member of the Bundestag
- In office September 7, 1949 – September 7, 1953

Personal details
- Born: 11 December 1882 Fulda
- Died: January 26, 1966 (aged 83)
- Party: FU

Thea Arnold (December 11, 1882 – January 26, 1966) was a German politician of the Federalist Union and former member of the German Bundestag.

== Life ==
Arnold was a member of the German Bundestag for one term from 1949 to 1953.

== Literature ==
Herbst, Ludolf; Jahn, Bruno (2002). Vierhaus, Rudolf (ed.). Biographisches Handbuch der Mitglieder des Deutschen Bundestages. 1949–2002 [Biographical Handbook of the Members of the German Bundestag. 1949–2002] (in German). München: De Gruyter - De Gruyter Saur. p. 1715. ISBN 978-3-11-184511-1.
