= Friedrich Holzapfel =

German politician (1900–1969)

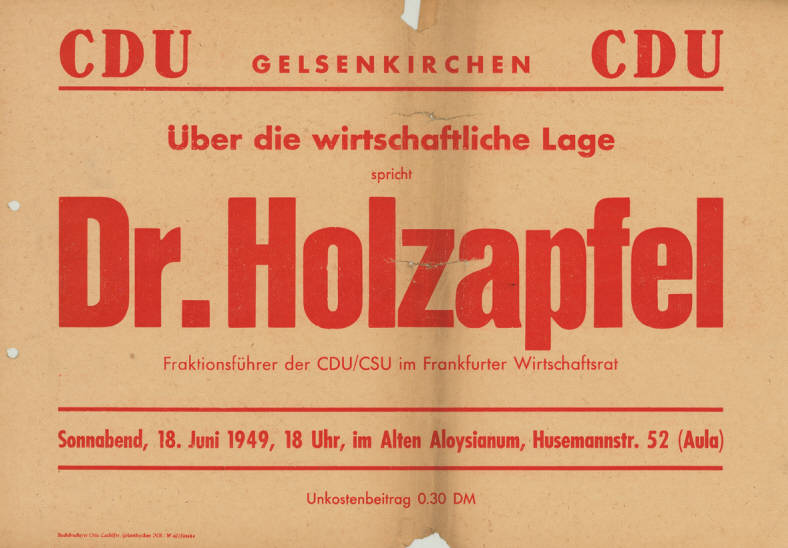
- Announcement poster Friedrich Holzapfels from the year 1949

Member of the Bundestag
- In office 7 September 1949 – 20 January 1953

Personal details
- Born: 20 July 1900 Bielefeld
- Died: 15 November 1969 (aged 69) Pottersville, New Jersey, United States
- Party: CDU

Friedrich Holzapfel (July 20, 1900 – November 15, 1969) was a German politician of the Christian Democratic Union (CDU) and former member of the German Bundestag.

== Life ==
Holzapfel briefly belonged to the state parliament of North Rhine-Westphalia in 1946, was a member of the Zone Advisory Council of the British occupation zone from 1946 to 1948 and of the Economic Council of the Bizone from 1947 to 1949, where he was the parliamentary party chairman of the joint CDU, CSU and DP faction and of the ERP committee.

He belonged to the Bundestag as a directly elected member of parliament in the constituency of Höxter (then Warburg-Höxter-Büren) from the first election in 1949 until his resignation on 20 January 1953.

== Literature ==
Herbst, Ludolf; Jahn, Bruno (2002). Vierhaus, Rudolf (ed.). Biographisches Handbuch der Mitglieder des Deutschen Bundestages. 1949–2002 [Biographical Handbook of the Members of the German Bundestag. 1949–2002] (in German). München: De Gruyter - De Gruyter Saur. p. 1715. ISBN 978-3-11-184511-1.
