= Karl Brunner (politician, born 1905) =

German politician

Member of the Bundestag
- In office 7 September 1949 – 13 November 1951

Personal details
- Born: 12 April 1905 Berlin
- Died: 13 November 1951 (aged 46)
- Party: SPD

Karl Brunner (12 August 1905 – 13 November 1951) was a German politician of the Social Democratic Party (SPD) and former member of the German Bundestag.

== Life ==
In the first federal election in 1949, he was elected to parliament via the North Rhine-Westphalia state list, to which he belonged until his early death in 1951.

== Literature ==
Herbst, Ludolf; Jahn, Bruno (2002). Vierhaus, Rudolf (ed.). Biographisches Handbuch der Mitglieder des Deutschen Bundestages. 1949–2002 [Biographical Handbook of the Members of the German Bundestag. 1949–2002] (in German). München: De Gruyter - De Gruyter Saur. p. 1715. ISBN 978-3-11-184511-1.
