= Günther Sewald =

German politician

Member of the Bundestag
- In office 7 September 1949 – 25 November 1949

Personal details
- Born: 12 April 1905
- Died: 25 November 1949 (aged 44)
- Party: CDU

Günther Sewald (April 12, 1905 – November 25, 1949) was a German politician of the Christian Democratic Union (CDU) and former member of the German Bundestag.

== Life ==
Sewald was a member of the Bundestag from the first federal election until his death. He was elected via the state list of the Christian Democratic Union of Germany (CDU) in North Rhine-Westphalia.

== Literature ==
Herbst, Ludolf; Jahn, Bruno (2002). Vierhaus, Rudolf (ed.). Biographisches Handbuch der Mitglieder des Deutschen Bundestages. 1949–2002 [Biographical Handbook of the Members of the German Bundestag. 1949–2002] (in German). München: De Gruyter - De Gruyter Saur. p. 1715. ISBN 978-3-11-184511-1.
