= Franz Etzel =

German politician (1902–1970)

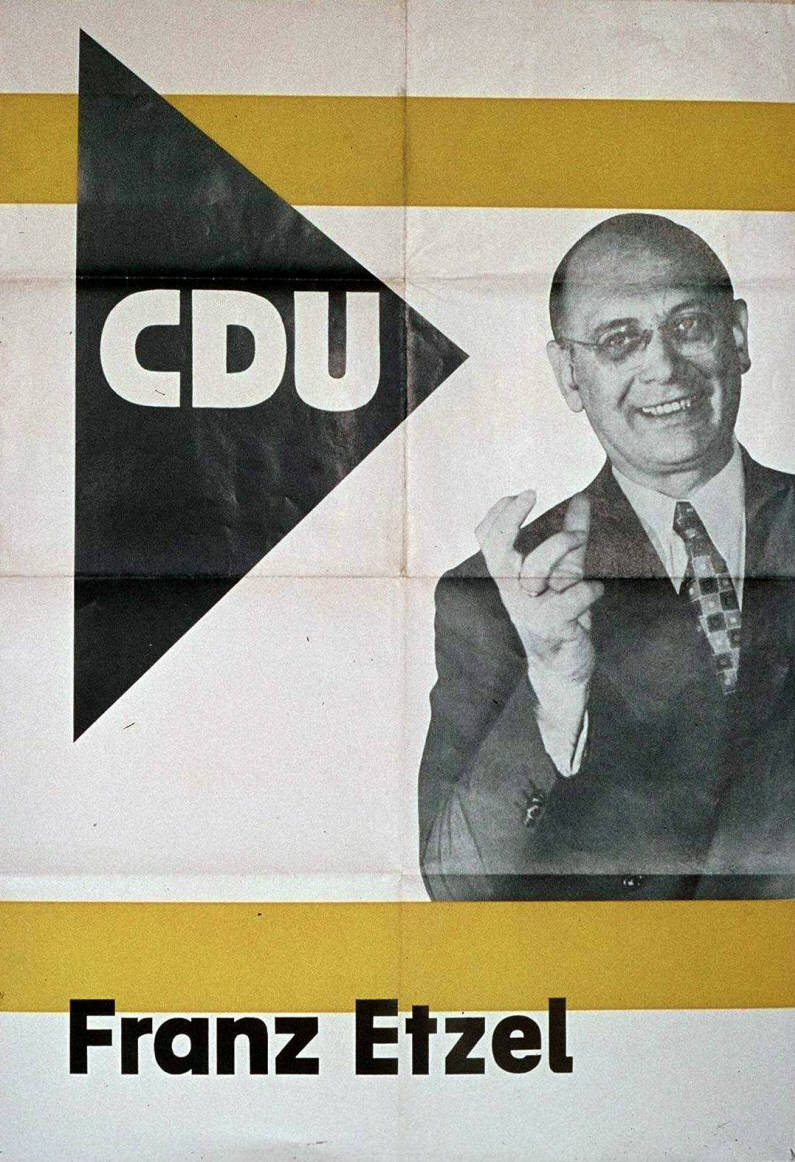
- Franz Etzel in 1957 campaign material

Minister of Finance
- In office 29 October 1957 – 14 November 1961
- Chancellor: Konrad Adenauer
- Preceded by: Fritz Schäffer
- Succeeded by: Heinz Starke

Member of the Bundestag
- In office 15 September 1957 – 19 September 1965
- In office 14 August 1949 – 4 January 1953

Personal details
- Born: 12 August 1902 Wesel
- Died: 9 May 1970 (aged 67) Düsseldorf
- Party: Nazi Party (until 1927); DNVP (1930s); Christian Democratic Union (1945–1970)
- Children: Piet-Jochen Etzel Doris Etzel Franz Etzel

Franz Etzel (12 August 1902 – 9 May 1970) was a German politician of the CDU.

Etzel was born in Wesel, Rhine Province. From 1949 to 4 January 1953 and from 1957 to 1965 Etzel was member of the German Bundestag. From 1957 to 1961 he was Minister of Finance. He died in Wittlaer by Düsseldorf, aged 67.

== See also ==
- List of German finance ministers
