= Walter Brookmann =

German politician (1901–1957)

Member of the Bundestag
- In office 7 September 1949 – 31 August 1957

Personal details
- Born: 23 April 1901 Rostock
- Died: 31 August 1957 (aged 56) Kiel, Schleswig-Holstein, Germany
- Party: CDU

Walter Brookmann (23 April 1901 – 31 August 1957) was a German politician of the Christian Democratic Union (CDU) and former member of the German Bundestag.

== Life ==
Brookmann joined the CDU in 1946 and was CDU Secretary General in Schleswig-Holstein from August 1946 to October 1949. Brookmann was a member of the German Bundestag from 1949 until his death in 1957. There he was deputy chairman of the Committee for All-German Affairs from 1949 to 1953 and deputy chairman of the Committee for All-German and Berlin Affairs from 1953 until his death. Brookmann always entered the Bundestag as a directly elected member of the Kiel constituency.

== Literature ==
Herbst, Ludolf; Jahn, Bruno (2002). Vierhaus, Rudolf (ed.). Biographisches Handbuch der Mitglieder des Deutschen Bundestages. 1949–2002 [Biographical Handbook of the Members of the German Bundestag. 1949–2002] (in German). München: De Gruyter - De Gruyter Saur. p. 1715. ISBN 978-3-11-184511-1.
