= Ernst Falkner =

German politician (1909–1950)

Member of the Bundestag
- In office 7 September 1949 – 27 October 1950

Personal details
- Born: 24 February 1909 München
- Died: 27 October 1950 (aged 41)
- Party: BP

Ernst Falkner (24 February 1909 – 27 October 1950) was a German politician of the Bavaria Party (BP) and former member of the German Bundestag.

== Life ==
Falkner was a member of the German Bundestag from the first federal election in 1949 until his death in 1950.

== Literature ==
Herbst, Ludolf; Jahn, Bruno (2002). Vierhaus, Rudolf (ed.). Biographisches Handbuch der Mitglieder des Deutschen Bundestages. 1949–2002 [Biographical Handbook of the Members of the German Bundestag. 1949–2002] (in German). München: De Gruyter - De Gruyter Saur. p. 1715. ISBN 978-3-11-184511-1.
