= Carl Schröter (politician) =

German politician

Member of the Bundestag
- In office 7 September 1949 – 25 February 1952

Personal details
- Born: 29 May 1887
- Died: 25 February 1952 (aged 64)
- Party: CDU

Carl Schröter (May 29, 1887 – February 25, 1952) was a German politician of the Christian Democratic Union (CDU) and former member of the German Bundestag.

== Life ==
On 26 February 1946, he was appointed by the British occupying power as a member of the Landtag of Schleswig-Holstein. Schröter subsequently also belonged to the second appointed Landtag and was a member of the Landtag elected via the Landesliste from 1947 until his resignation on 21 May 1950, where he was chairman of the CDU Landtag faction and thus also leader of the opposition. In addition, Schröter was a member of the Zone Advisory Council of the British occupation zone in 1947–48 and the Parliamentary Council in 1948–49.

From 1949 until his death, he was a directly elected member of parliament for the Segeberg - Neumünster constituency and finally a member of the German Bundestag, where he was deputy chairman of the CDU/CSU parliamentary group from 17 January 1950.

== Literature ==
Herbst, Ludolf; Jahn, Bruno (2002). Vierhaus, Rudolf (ed.). Biographisches Handbuch der Mitglieder des Deutschen Bundestages. 1949–2002 [Biographical Handbook of the Members of the German Bundestag. 1949–2002] (in German). München: De Gruyter - De Gruyter Saur. p. 1715. ISBN 978-3-11-184511-1.
