= List of German Free Democratic Party politicians =

A list of notable politicians of the German Free Democratic Party:

==A==
- Ernst Achenbach
- Jens Ackermann
- Karl Addicks
- Grigorios Aggelidis
- Christian Ahrendt
- Gustav Altenhain
- Alexander Alvaro
- Hermann Andersen
- Joachim Angermeyer
- Christine Aschenberg-Dugnus
- Karl Atzenroth
- Christel Augenstein
- Rudolf Augstein

== B ==
- Gisela Babel
- Thomas Bach
- Daniel Bahr
- Martin Bangemann
- Georg Barfuß
- Christian Bartelt
- Uwe Barth
- Nicole Bauer
- Gerhart Baum
- Max Becker
- Klaus Beckmann
- Jens Beeck
- Olaf in der Beek
- Nicola Beer
- Florian Bernschneider
- Werner Best
- Stefan Birkner
- Karl Theodor Bleek
- Franz Blücher
- Jörg Bode
- Ingo Bodtke
- Friedhelm Boginski
- Wigald Boning
- William Borm
- Dennys Bornhöft
- Jens Brandenburg
- Mario Brandenburg
- Gökhan Brandt
- Sigismund von Braun
- Rainer Brüderle
- Angelika Brunkhorst
- Klaus Brunnstein
- Sandra Bubendorfer-Licht
- Ignatz Bubis
- Ewald Bucher
- Bernd Klaus Buchholz
- Ernst Burgbacher
- Marco Buschmann
- Karlheinz Busen

== C ==
- Herbert Christ
- Jorgo Chatzimarkakis
- Jürgen Chrobog
- Jürgen Creutzmann
- Fritz Czermak

== D ==
- Rolf Dahlgrün
- Ralf Dahrendorf
- Robert Dannemann
- Werner Danz
- Britta Dassler
- Thomas Dehler
- Volrad Deneke
- Emmy Diemer-Nicolaus
- Hans Dirscherl
- Bijan Djir-Sarai
- René Domke
- Patrick Döring
- Wolfgang Döring
- Wolfram Dörinkel
- Wolfram Dorn
- Otto Dowidat
- Walter Drechsel
- Christian Dürr

== E ==
- Hartmut Ebbing
- Anton Eberhard
- Josef Effertz
- Norbert Eimer
- Otto Eisenmann
- Hans Georg Emde
- Hans A. Engelhard
- Adolf Ernst
- Josef Ertl
- Jörg van Essen

== F ==
- Marcus Faber
- Heinrich Fassbender
- Olaf Feldmann
- Philipp Fernis
- Alena Fink-Trauschel
- Karl-Hermann Flach
- Hedi Flitz
- Daniel Föst
- Björn Försterling
- Helmar Frank
- Rolf Frick
- Richard Freudenberg
- Otto Fricke
- Hans Friderichs
- Paul Friedhoff
- Hans Friedrich
- Horst Friedrich
- Lotte Friese-Korn
- Rita Fromm
- Konrad Frühwald
- Liselotte Funcke
- Oscar Funcke
- Rainer Funke
- Maximilian Funke-Kaiser

== G ==
- Heiner Garg
- Martin Gassner-Herz
- Yvonne Gebauer
- Karl Geldner
- Gustav Freiherr von Gemmingen-Hornberg
- Hans-Dietrich Genscher
- Wolfgang Gerhardt
- Manfred Gerlach
- Fritz Glahn
- Anikó Glogowski-Merten
- Hubertus von Golitschek
- Christian Grascha
- Rötger Groß, de:Rötger Groß
- Josef Grünbeck
- Martin Grüner

== H ==
- Thomas Hacker
- Marcel Hafke
- Jörg-Uwe Hahn
- Dieter Hallervorden
- Hildegard Hamm-Brücher
- Richard Hammer
- Ludwig Hartenfels
- Christoph Hartmann
- Johann Hauser
- Helmut Haussmann
- Christel Happach-Kasan
- Wolfgang Heinz
- Hans Henn
- Katja Hessel
- Theodor Heuss
- Elly Heuss-Knapp
- Dirk Hilbert
- Burkhard Hirsch
- Nadja Hirsch
- Gero Clemens Hocker
- Henning Höne
- Elke Hoff
- Karl Holl
- Hermann Höpker-Aschoff
- Werner Hoyer
- Karl Hübner
- Ole Humpich
- Lydia Hüskens

== I ==
- Ulla Ihnen
- Fritz Emil Irrgang

== J ==
- Gyde Jensen
- Harry John
- Christian Jung

== K ==
- Michael Kauch
- Daniel Karrais
- Friedrich-Wilhelm Kiel
- Emilie Kiep-Altenloh
- Wolf Klinz
- Werner Klumpp
- Wiebke Knell
- Pascal Kober
- Waldemar Koch
- Silvana Koch-Mehrin
- Gabriela König
- Georg Kohl
- Heinrich Kohl
- Moritz Körner
- Holger Krahmer
- Ottomar Rodolphe Vlad Dracula Prince Kretzulesco
- Wolfgang Kubicki
- Knut von Kühlmann-Stumm
- Konstantin Kuhle
- Oliver Kumbartzky

== L ==
- Karl-Hans Laermann
- Alexander Graf Lambsdorff
- Heinz Lange
- Hubert Lanz
- Sibylle Laurischk
- Hans Lenz
- Sabine Leutheusser-Schnarrenberger
- Ernst Ludwig Leyser
- Thorsten Lieb
- Christian Lindner
- Hubertus Prinz zu Löwenstein-Wertheim-Freudenberg
- Barbara Lüdemann
- Marie Elisabeth Lüders

== M ==
- Reinhold Maier
- Werner Maihofer
- Till Mansmann
- Hasso von Manteuffel
- Helmut Markwort
- Gesine Meißner
- Erich Mende
- Christoph Meyer
- Friedrich Middelhauve
- Wolfgang Mischnick
- Erich Mix
- Jürgen Möllemann
- Sky du Mont
- Maximilian Mordhorst
- Hans Mühlenfeld
- Alexander Müller
- Franziska Müller-Rech
- Frank Müller-Rosentritt

== N ==
- Fritz Neumayer
- Dirk Niebel
- Robert Philipp Nöll von der Nahmer
- Wilhelm Nowack

== O ==
- Theodor Oberländer
- Jan-Christoph Oetjen
- Rudolf Opitz
- Rainer Ortleb

== P ==
- Karl-Heinz Paque
- Andreas Paulus
- Rose Pauly
- Cornelia Pieper
- Andreas Pinkwart

== Q ==
- Hans-Hellmuth Qualen, de:Hans-Hellmuth Qualen

== R ==
- Wilhelm Rath
- Hans Albrecht Freiherr von Rechenberg
- Günter Rexrodt
- Klaus Rickert
- René Rock
- Klaus Rainer Röhl
- Hans Joachim von Rohr-Demmin
- Uwe Ronneburger
- Philipp Rösler
- Hans-Ulrich Rülke

== S ==
- Hans-Heinrich Sander
- Thomas Sattelberger
- Walter Scheel
- Eugen Schiffer
- Konrad Schily
- Wilhelmine Schirmer-Pröscher
- Edzard Schmidt-Jortzig
- Jürgen Schmieder
- Daniela Schmitt
- Peter Schmitz
- Fritz Schneider
- Klaus Scholder
- Walter Schroeder
- Ria Schröder
- Fritz-Rudolf Schultz
- Jimmy Schulz
- Marina Schuster
- Willem Schuth
- Hans-Werner Schwarz
- Gerhard Graf von Schwerin
- Hartmut Sieckmann
- Hermann Otto Solms
- Max Stadler
- Alexander von Stahl
- Wolfgang Stammberger
- Heinz Starke
- Bettina Stark-Watzinger
- Marie-Agnes Strack-Zimmermann

== T ==
- Cornelia von Teichman und Logischen
- Linda Teuteberg
- Jens Teutrine
- Alexandra Thein
- Michael Theurer
- Stephan Thomae
- Nico Tippelt
- Manfred Todtenhausen
- Florian Toncar

== V ==
- Marc Vallendar
- Günter Verheugen
- Johannes Vogel
- Fritz Vogt

== W ==
- Fritz Walter
- Rüdiger von Wechmar
- Liesel Westermann
- Guido Westerwelle
- Eberhard Wildermuth
- Heike Wilms-Kegel
- Steven Wink
- Carl Wirths
- Volker Wissing
- David Wulff

== Z ==
- Holger Zastrow
- Martin Zeil
- Roland Zielke
