= Braunschweig (electoral district) =

Federal electoral district of Germany

50 Braunschweig
- Electoral district for the Bundestag
- Braunschweig in 2025
- State: Lower Saxony
- Population: 249,400 (2019)
- Electorate: 187,721 (2021)
- Major settlements: Braunschweig
- Area: 192.7 km^{2}

Current electoral district
- Created: 1949
- Party: SPD
- Member: Christos Pantazis
- Elected: 2021, 2025

Braunschweig is an electoral constituency (German: Wahlkreis) represented in the Bundestag. It elects one member via first-past-the-post voting. Under the current constituency numbering system, it is designated as constituency 50. It is located in southeastern Lower Saxony, comprising the city of Braunschweig.

Braunschweig was created for the inaugural 1949 federal election. Since 2021, it has been represented by Christos Pantazis of the Social Democratic Party (SPD).

== Geography ==
Braunschweig is located in southeastern Lower Saxony. As of the 2021 federal election, it comprises the independent city of Braunschweig.

== History ==
Braunschweig was created in 1949, then known as Stadt Braunschweig. It acquired its current name in the 1965 election. In the inaugural Bundestag election, it was Lower Saxony constituency 28 in the numbering system. From 1953 through 1961, it was number 50. From 1965 through 1998, it was number 45. In the 2002 and 2005 elections, it was number 50. In the 2009 election, it was number 51. Since the 2013 election, it has been number 50. Its borders have not changed since its creation.

Election	No.	Name	Borders
1949	28	Stadt Braunschweig	Braunschweig city
1953	50	Stadt Braunschweig	Braunschweig city
1957	50	Stadt Braunschweig	Braunschweig city
1961	50	Stadt Braunschweig	Braunschweig city
1965	45	Braunschweig	Braunschweig city
1969	45	Braunschweig	Braunschweig city
1972	45	Braunschweig	Braunschweig city
1976	45	Braunschweig	Braunschweig city
1980	45	Braunschweig	Braunschweig city
1983	45	Braunschweig	Braunschweig city
1987	45	Braunschweig	Braunschweig city
1990	45	Braunschweig	Braunschweig city
1994	45	Braunschweig	Braunschweig city
1998	45	Braunschweig	Braunschweig city
2002	50	Braunschweig	Braunschweig city
2005	50	Braunschweig	Braunschweig city
2009	51	Braunschweig	Braunschweig city
2013	50	Braunschweig	Braunschweig city
2017	50	Braunschweig	Braunschweig city
2021	50	Braunschweig	Braunschweig city
2025	50	Braunschweig	Braunschweig city

== Members ==
The constituency was first held by Otto Arnholz of the Social Democratic Party (SPD), who served from 1949 to 1957. Hermann Koch of the Christian Democratic Union (CDU) won in 1957 and served a single term. Walter Schmidt of the SPD then served from 1961 to 1972, followed by Hermann Oetting for a single term. Klaus-Dieter Kühbacher was elected in 1976 and served two terms. In 1983, Joachim Clemens of the CDU was elected representative, and served until 1994. Leyla Onur regained the constituency for the SPD in 1994, and was re-elected in 1998. Carola Reimann won in 2002, and was re-elected in 2005, 2009, 2013, and 2017. She resigned in November 2017 after being appointed to the state government of Lower Saxony. Christos Pantazis of the SPD was elected in 2021.

Election	Member	Party	%
1949	Otto Arnholz	SPD	39.9
1953	Otto Arnholz	SPD	37.1
1957	Hermann Koch	CDU	42.0
1961	Walter Schmidt	SPD	45.2
1965	Walter Schmidt	SPD	47.0
1969	Walter Schmidt	SPD	54.1
1972	Hermann Oetting	SPD	58.6
1976	Klaus-Dieter Kühbacher	SPD	51.0
1980	Klaus-Dieter Kühbacher	SPD	51.5
1983	Joachim Clemens	CDU	46.7
1987	Joachim Clemens	CDU	43.8
1990	Joachim Clemens	CDU	44.3
1994	Leyla Onur	SPD	44.6
1998	Leyla Onur	SPD	55.8
2002	Carola Reimann	SPD	54.1
2005	Carola Reimann	SPD	51.5
2009	Carola Reimann	SPD	38.7
2013	Carola Reimann	SPD	43.6
2017	Carola Reimann	SPD	38.0
2021	Christos Pantazis	SPD	36.7
2025	Christos Pantazis	SPD	33.4

== Election results ==
=== 2025 election ===
Federal election (2025): Braunschweig
Notes:	Blue background denotes the winner of the electorate vote. Pink background denotes a candidate elected from their party list. Yellow background denotes an electorate win by a list member, or other incumbent. A ✓ or ✗ denotes status of any incumbent, win or lose respectively.						
Party	Candidate	Votes	%	±%	Party votes	%	±%
SPD	✓ Christos Pantazis	51,551	33.4	▼3.3	34,992	22.6	▼7.8
CDU	Carsten Müller	38,156	24.7	▲2.3	34,956	22.6	▲4.0
Greens	Lisa-Marie Jalyschko	21,983	14.3	▼6.0	27,788	18.0	▼6.0
AfD	Mirco Hanker	20,471	13.3	▲7.5	20,622	13.3	▲7.4
Left	Leon Huesmann	12,660	8.2	▲4.4	17,979	11.6	▲7.1
BSW					5,966	3.9	
FDP	Anikó Merten	4,461	2.9	▼4.1	6,142	4.0	▼6.1
Volt	Martin Piepgras	2,447	1.6		1,729	1.1	▲0.4
FW	Olaf Funke	1,668	1.1	▲0.2	799	0.5	▼0.1
Tierschutzpartei					1,661	1.1	▼0.1
PARTEI					869	0.6	▼0.6
Independent	Andreas Wolter	615	0.4				
dieBasis				▼1.2	375	0.2	▼0.8
Pirates					287	0.2	▼0.4
Humanists					145	0.1	0.0
Volt					1,012	0.7	
BD					158	0.1	
MLPD	Paul Deutsch	251	0.2	▲0.1	87	0.1	0.0
Team Todenhöfer							▼0.5
ÖDP				▼0.3			▼0.1
Informal votes		1,116			824		
Total valid votes		154,263			154,555		
Turnout		155,379	83.4	▲8.4			
SPD hold	Majority	13,395	8.7	▼6.6			

=== 2021 election ===
Federal election (2021): Braunschweig
Notes:	Blue background denotes the winner of the electorate vote. Pink background denotes a candidate elected from their party list. Yellow background denotes an electorate win by a list member, or other incumbent. A ✓ or ✗ denotes status of any incumbent, win or lose respectively.						
Party	Candidate	Votes	%	±%	Party votes	%	±%
SPD	Christos Pantazis	51,220	36.7	▼1.3	42,377	30.4	▲4.0
CDU	Carsten Müller	31,276	22.4	▼8.9	25,929	18.6	▼10.4
Greens	Margaux Erdmann	28,214	20.2	▲12.2	33,401	24.0	▲12.2
FDP	Anikó Merten	9,816	7.0	▲1.7	14,046	10.1	▲0.1
AfD	Frank Weber	8,045	5.8	▼2.0	8,238	5.9	▼2.5
Left	Alper Özgür	5,352	3.8	▼3.8	6,355	4.6	▼4.8
PARTEI					1,652	1.2	▼0.7
Tierschutzpartei					1,567	1.1	▲0.2
dieBasis	Christoph Bedürftig	1,640	1.2		1,444	1.0	
Independent	Peter Rosenbaum	1,359	1.0				
Volt					1,012	0.7	
FW	Eike Jankun	1,194	0.9		844	0.6	▲0.3
Pirates					785	0.6	▼0.1
Team Todenhöfer					675	0.5	
V-Partei3	Anna Saskia Wolters	630	0.5		280	0.2	0.0
Independent	Andreas Wolter	212	0.2				
Humanists					189	0.1	
ÖDP	Klaus Joachim Arndt	352	0.3		180	0.1	0.0
NPD					101	0.1	▼0.1
du.					81	0.1	
MLPD	Philipp Schwartz	101	0.1	▼0.2	52	0.0	▼0.1
LKR	Christian Helck	80	0.1		53	0.0	
Independent	Erdmann Gust	62	0.0				
DKP					33	0.0	0.0
Informal votes		1,254			1,513		
Total valid votes		139,553			139,294		
Turnout		140,807	75.0	▼1.9			
SPD hold	Majority	19,944	14.3	▲7.7			

=== 2017 election ===
Federal election (2017): Braunschweig
Notes:	Blue background denotes the winner of the electorate vote. Pink background denotes a candidate elected from their party list. Yellow background denotes an electorate win by a list member, or other incumbent. A ✓ or ✗ denotes status of any incumbent, win or lose respectively.						
Party	Candidate	Votes	%	±%	Party votes	%	±%
SPD	✓ Carola Reimann	55,641	38.0	▼5.6	38,695	26.4	▼7.2
CDU	Carsten Müller	45,881	31.4	▼3.6	42,534	29.0	▼5.0
Greens	Juliane Krause	11,761	8.0	▲0.9	17,295	11.8	▼0.6
AfD	Mirco Hanker	11,377	7.8	▲5.0	12,268	8.4	▲4.8
Left	Cihane Gürtas-Yildirim	11,145	7.6	▲2.6	13,673	9.3	▲2.6
FDP	Ingo Schramm	7,877	5.4	▲3.1	14,684	10.0	▲5.6
PARTEI					2,698	1.8	
Independent	Peter Rosenbaum	2,324	1.6				
Tierschutzpartei					1,423	1.0	▲0.1
Pirates					905	0.6	▼2.3
FW					413	0.3	▼0.2
BGE					394	0.3	
DiB					390	0.3	
NPD					308	0.2	▼0.5
DM					298	0.2	
V-Partei³					296	0.2	
ÖDP					223	0.2	
MLPD	Paul Deutsch	344	0.2		130	0.1	0.0
DKP					30	0.0	
Informal votes		1,362			1,055		
Total valid votes		146,350			146,657		
Turnout		147,712	76.9	▲2.7			
SPD hold	Majority	9,760	6.6	▼2.0			

=== 2013 election ===
Federal election (2013): Braunschweig
Notes:	Blue background denotes the winner of the electorate vote. Pink background denotes a candidate elected from their party list. Yellow background denotes an electorate win by a list member, or other incumbent. A ✓ or ✗ denotes status of any incumbent, win or lose respectively.						
Party	Candidate	Votes	%	±%	Party votes	%	±%
SPD	✓ Carola Reimann	61,952	43.6	▲4.8	47,741	33.6	▲4.8
CDU	Carsten Müller	49,710	35.0	▲0.6	48,419	34.0	▲5.0
Greens	Gesche Hand	10,117	7.1	▼1.6	17,614	12.4	▼1.9
Left	André Patrick Fricke	7,119	5.0	▼2.8	9,527	6.7	▼3.2
Pirates	Jens-Wolfhard Schicke-Uffmann	4,012	2.8	▼0.2	4,169	2.9	▼0.7
AfD	Klaus Harig	3,894	2.7		5,092	3.6	
FDP	Florian Bernschneider	3,243	2.3	▼3.1	6,214	4.4	▼7.1
Tierschutzpartei					1,295	0.9	▲0.1
NPD	Eckhard Aden	1,032	0.7	▼0.2	1,038	0.7	▼0.2
FW	Stefan Roßmann	908	0.6		724	0.5	
PBC					128	0.1	
PRO					127	0.1	
MLPD	Paul Deutsch	116	0.1	0.0	100	0.1	0.0
REP					97	0.1	
Informal votes		1,649			1,467		
Total valid votes		142,103			142,285		
Turnout		143,752	74.2	▲0.5			
SPD hold	Majority	12,242	8.6	▲4.4			

=== 2009 election ===
Federal election (2009): Braunschweig
Notes:	Blue background denotes the winner of the electorate vote. Pink background denotes a candidate elected from their party list. Yellow background denotes an electorate win by a list member, or other incumbent. A ✓ or ✗ denotes status of any incumbent, win or lose respectively.						
Party	Candidate	Votes	%	±%	Party votes	%	±%
SPD	✓ Carola Reimann	53,572	38.8	▼12.7	39,774	28.7	▼15.7
CDU	Carsten Müller	47,584	34.4	▼0.9	40,135	29.0	▲0.1
Greens	Helmut Blöcker	12,012	8.7	▲4.1	19,831	14.3	▲4.4
Left	Thomas Röver	10,801	7.8	▲3.4	13,763	9.9	▲4.4
FDP	Florian Bernschneider	7,507	5.4	▲2.4	15,845	11.4	▲3.0
Pirates	Jens-Wolfhard Schicke	4,214	3.0		4,962	3.6	
NPD	Andreas Wolf	1,310	0.9	▼0.1	1,324	1.0	▼0.1
RRP					1,270	0.9	
Tierschutzpartei					1,114	0.8	▲0.1
Independent	Frank Thomas	802	0.6				
Independent	Horst Dauter	294	0.2				
ÖDP					184	0.1	
DVU					134	0.1	
MLPD	Paul Deutsch	118	0.1	▼0.1	77	0.1	0.0
Informal votes		1,736			1,535		
Total valid votes		138,212			138,413		
Turnout		139,948	73.7	▼4.8			
SPD hold	Majority	5,988	4.3	▼11.9			

=== 2005 election ===
Federal election (2005):Braunschweig
Notes:	Blue background denotes the winner of the electorate vote. Pink background denotes a candidate elected from their party list. Yellow background denotes an electorate win by a list member, or other incumbent. A ✓ or ✗ denotes status of any incumbent, win or lose respectively.						
Party	Candidate	Votes	%	±%	Party votes	%	±%
SPD	✓ Carola Reimann	74,710	51.5	▼2.6	64,679	44.5	▼5.3
CDU	Carsten Müller	51,257	35.3	▲1.3	42,048	28.9	▼0.9
Greens	Rehinhold Zabel	6,613	3.0	▼0.9	14,421	9.9	▼0.1
Left	Thomas Röver	6,376	4.4	▲2.9	8,096	5.6	▲3.9
FDP	Ulrich Klages	4,414	3.0	▼1.3	12,344	8.6	▲1.6
NPD	Michael Weinberg	1,579	1.1		1,597	1.1	▲0.9
Tierschutzpartei					986	0.7	▲0.3
GRAUEN					667	0.5	▲0.3
MLPD	Christel Deutsch-Otabo	233	0.2		127	0.1	
PBC					230	0.2	0.0
Pro German Center – Pro D-Mark Initiative					124	0.1	
BüSo					78	0.1	0.0
Informal votes		2,168			1,953		
Total valid votes		145,182			145,397		
Turnout		147,350	78.5	▼1.3			
SPD hold	Majority	23,453	16.2				
