= Czermak =

Czermak is a surname. Notable people with the surname include:

- Fritz Czermak (1894–1966), German politician
- Johann Nepomuk Czermak (1828–1873), Austrian-German physiologist
