= Rose Pauly =

Rose Pauly may refer to:

- Rose Pauly (politician) (born 1938), a German politician
- Rose Pauly (singer) (1894–1975), a Hungarian-born opera singer
