= Runte =

Runte is a surname. Notable people with the surname include:

- Al Runte (born 1947), American environmental historian and college educator
- Fritz von Runte, English DJ and music producer
- Roseann Runte (born 1948), American-Canadian academic
- Walter Runte, American politician
- Wilhelm Runte (1898–1977), Mayor of Soest, see List of German Free Democratic Party politicians
