= 2029 European Parliament election =

Next European Parliament election
- 7–10 June 2029 (Note: By default the election is held in the same period as in 1979. However, the Council may agree to move the date at least one year before the expiration of the electoral term.)

All 720 seats in the European Parliament 361 seats needed for a majority
- Opinion polls
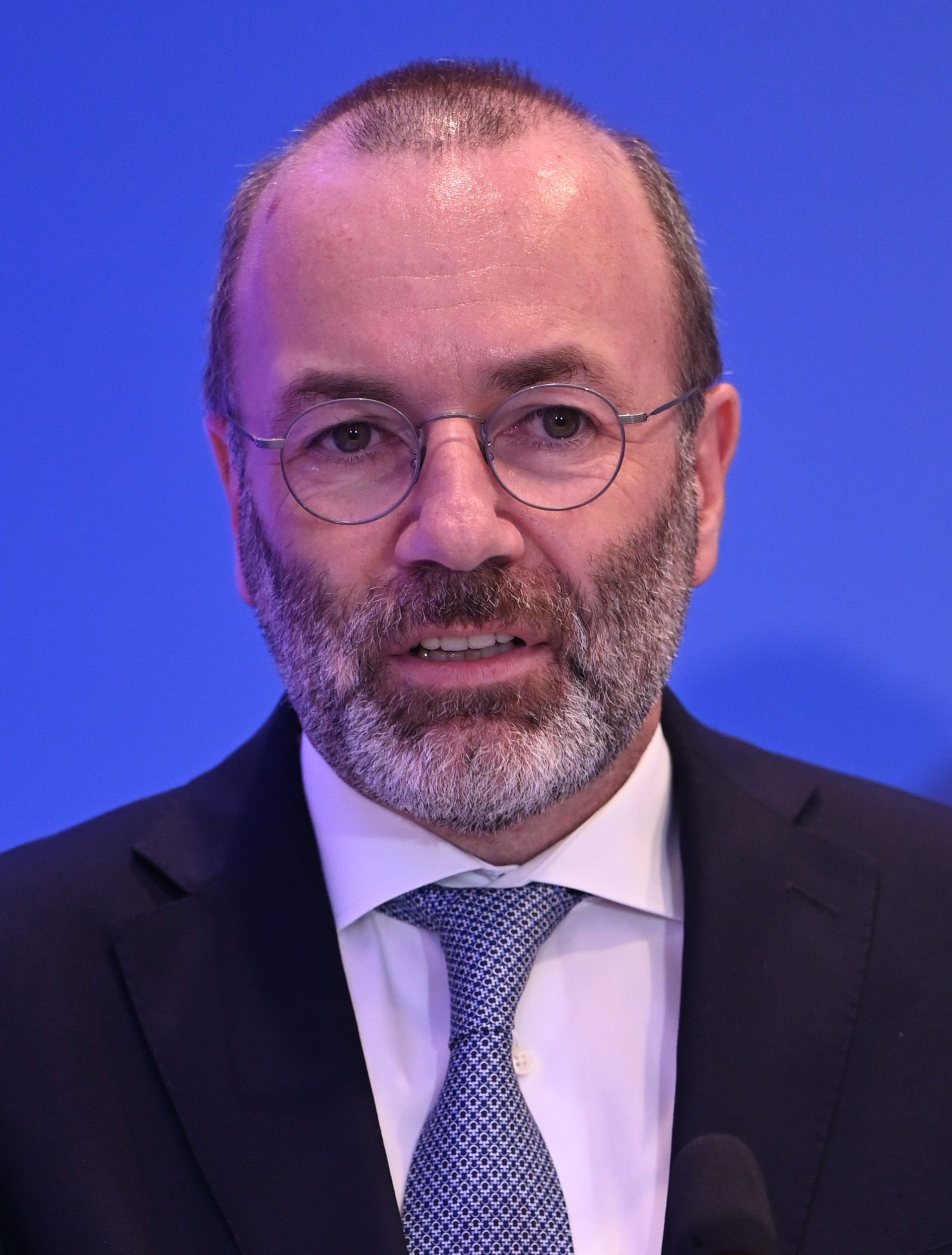

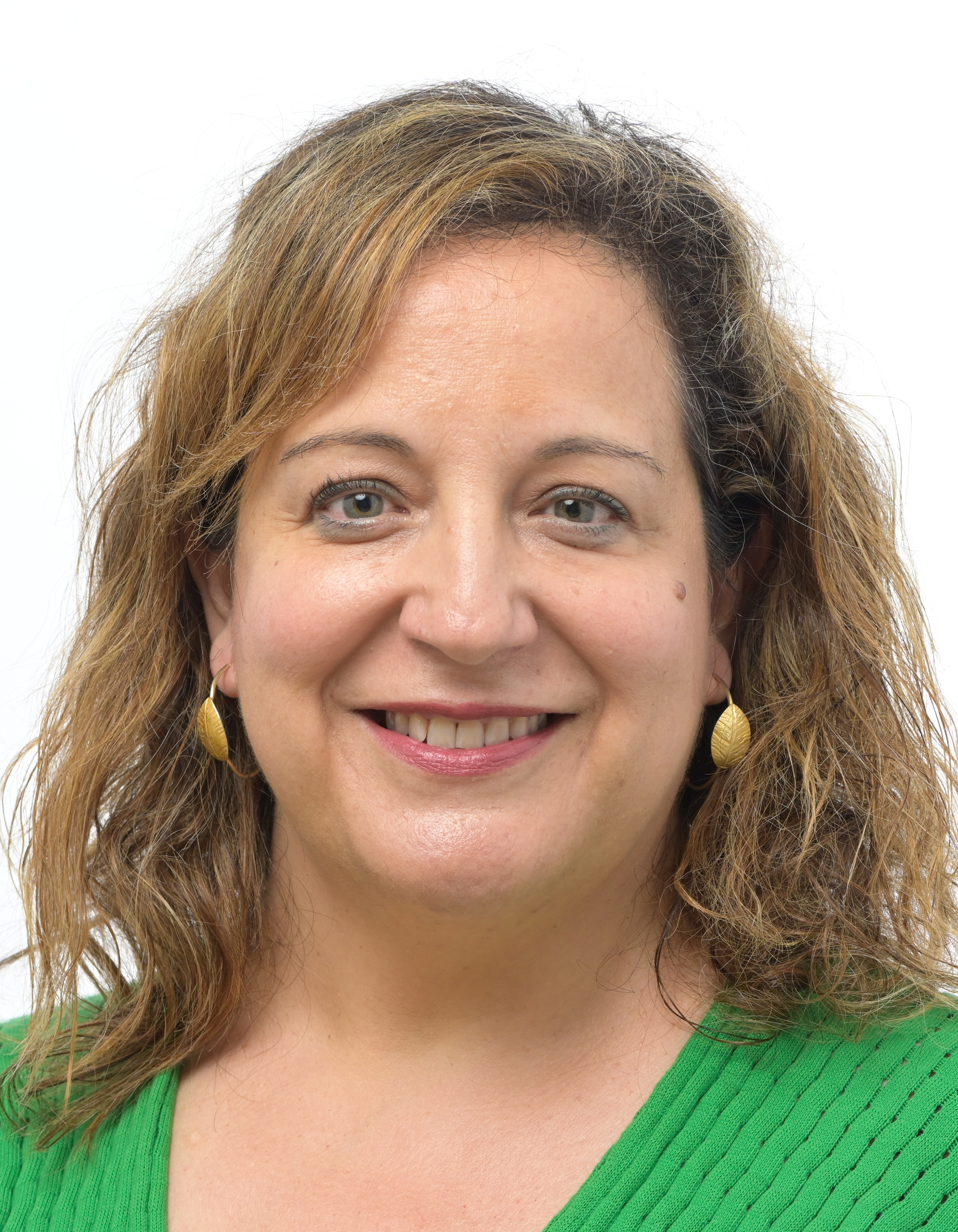

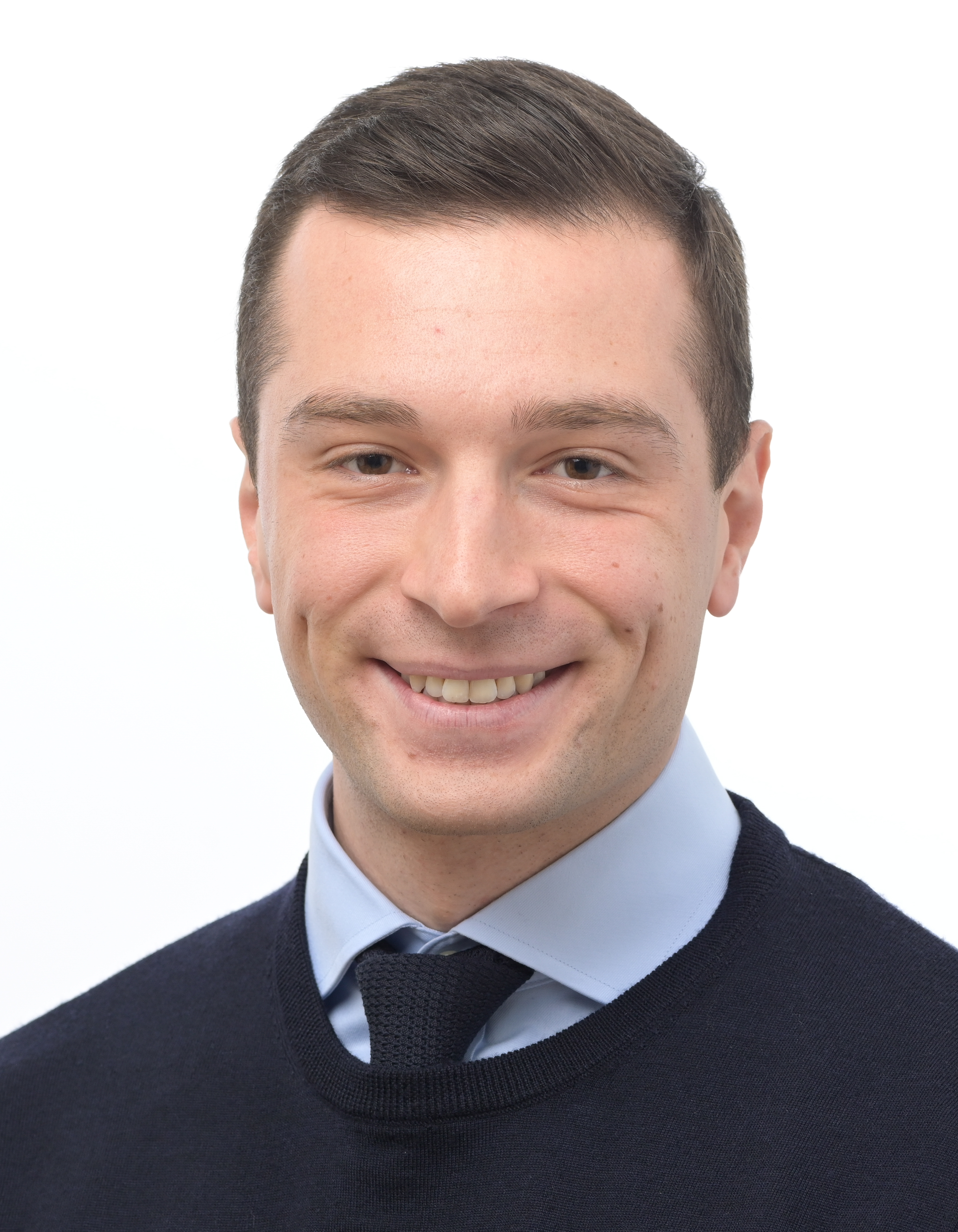

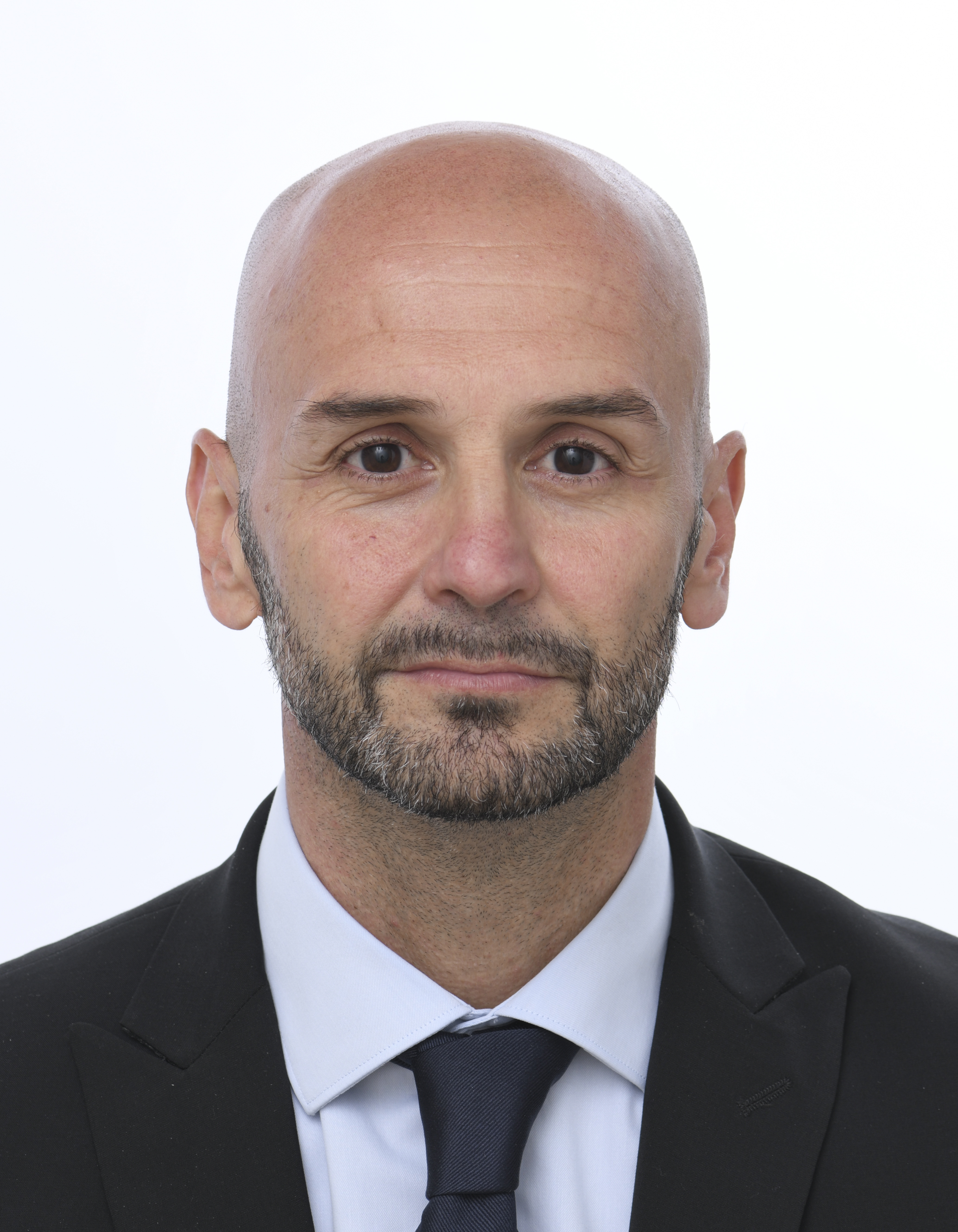

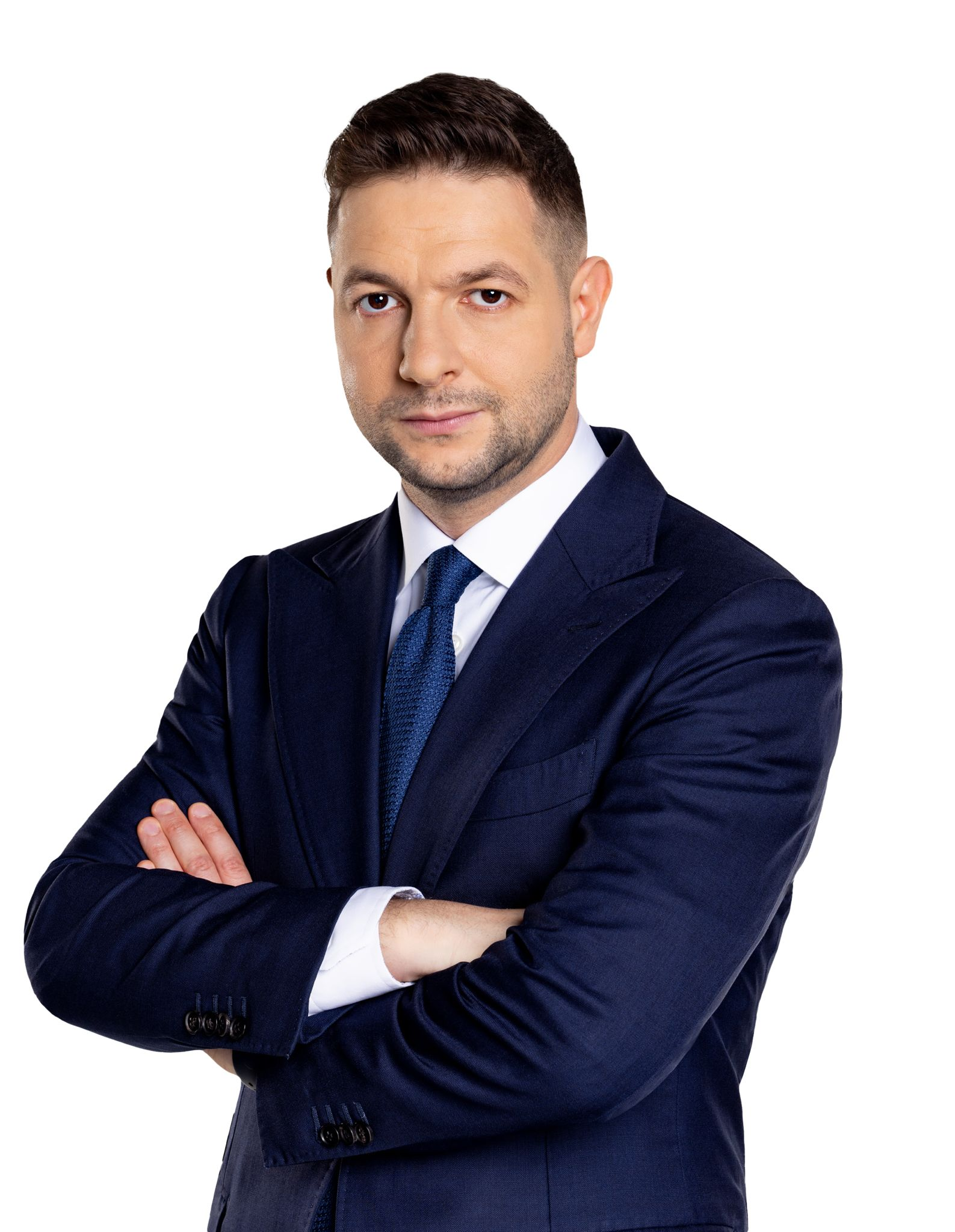

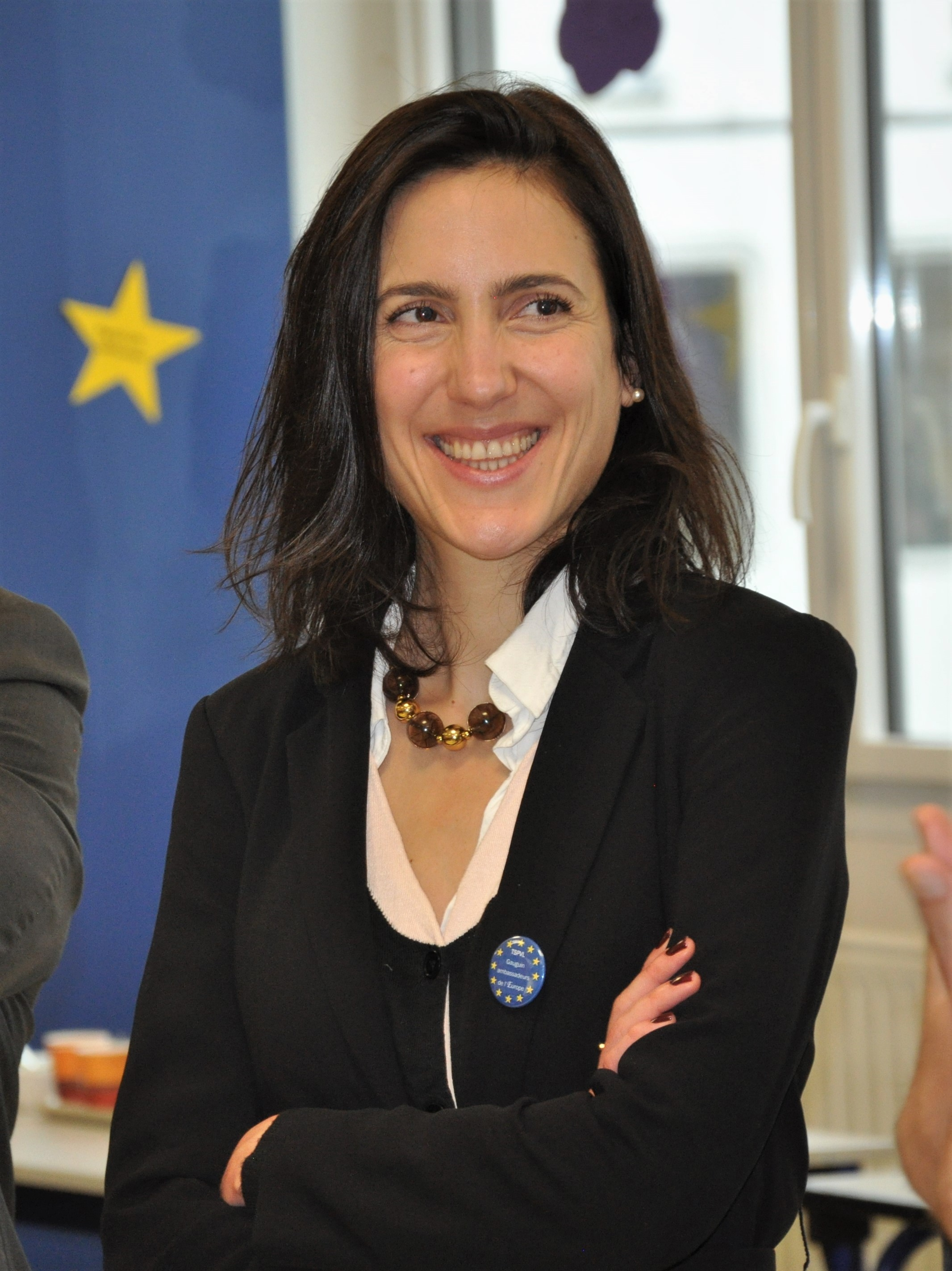

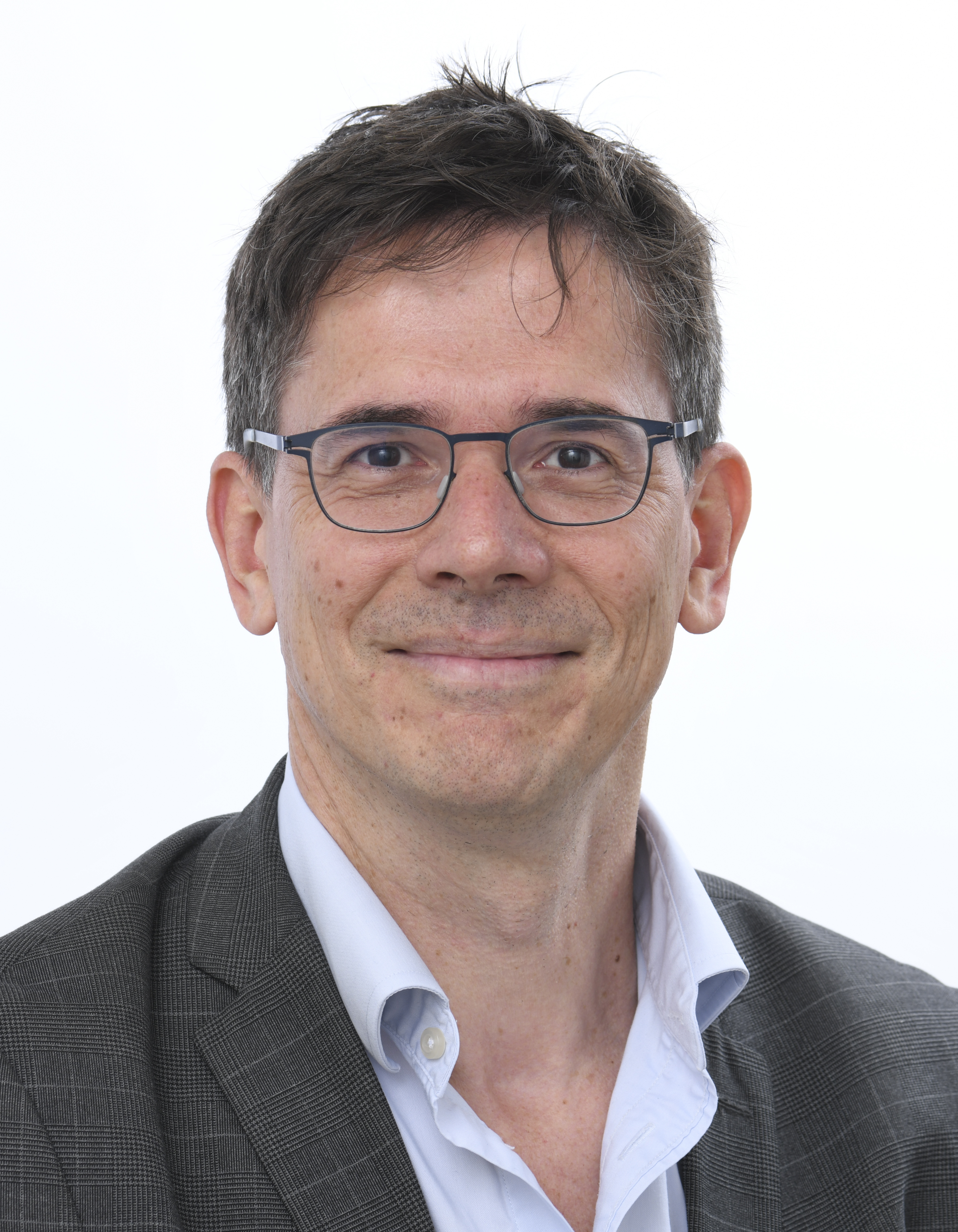

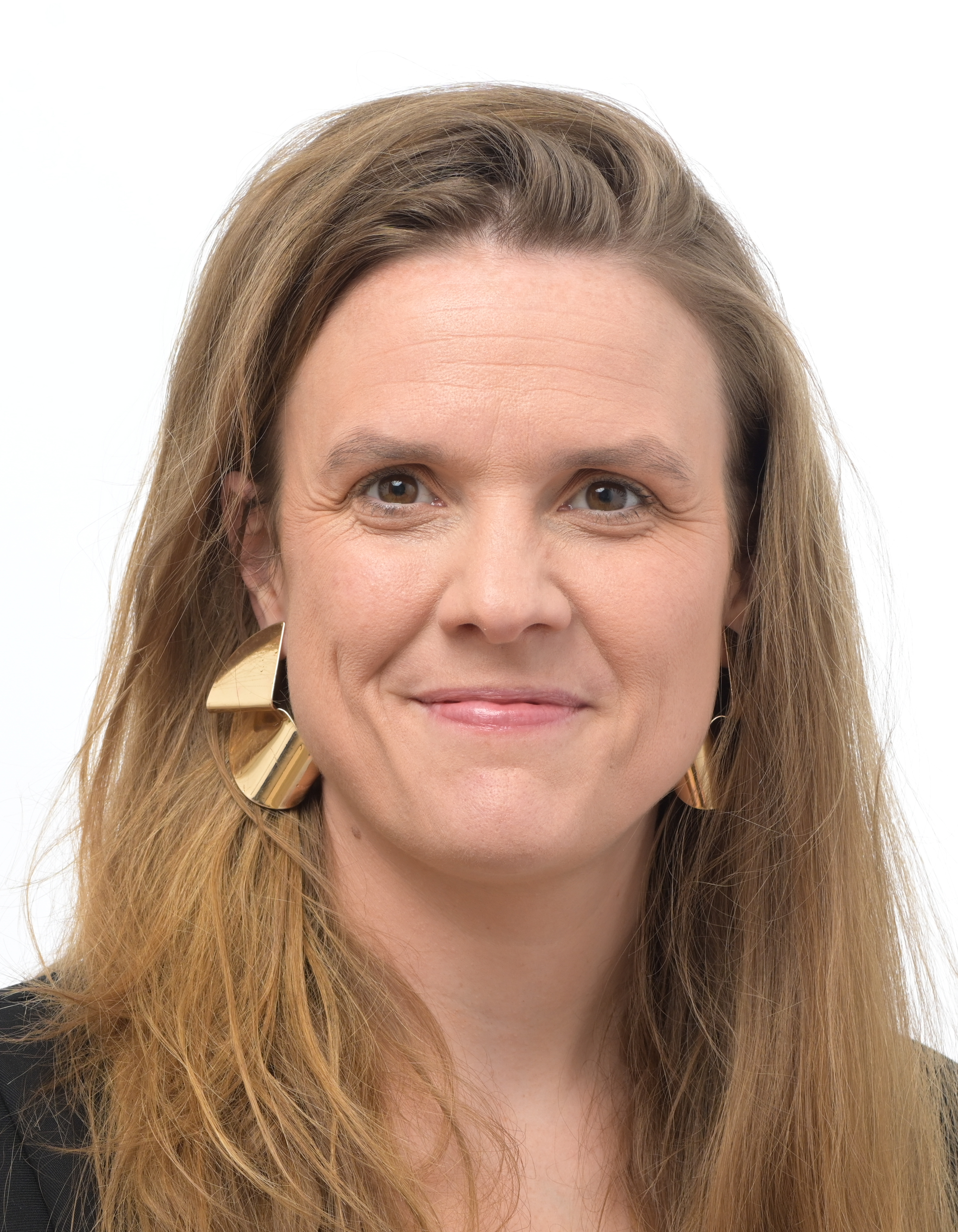

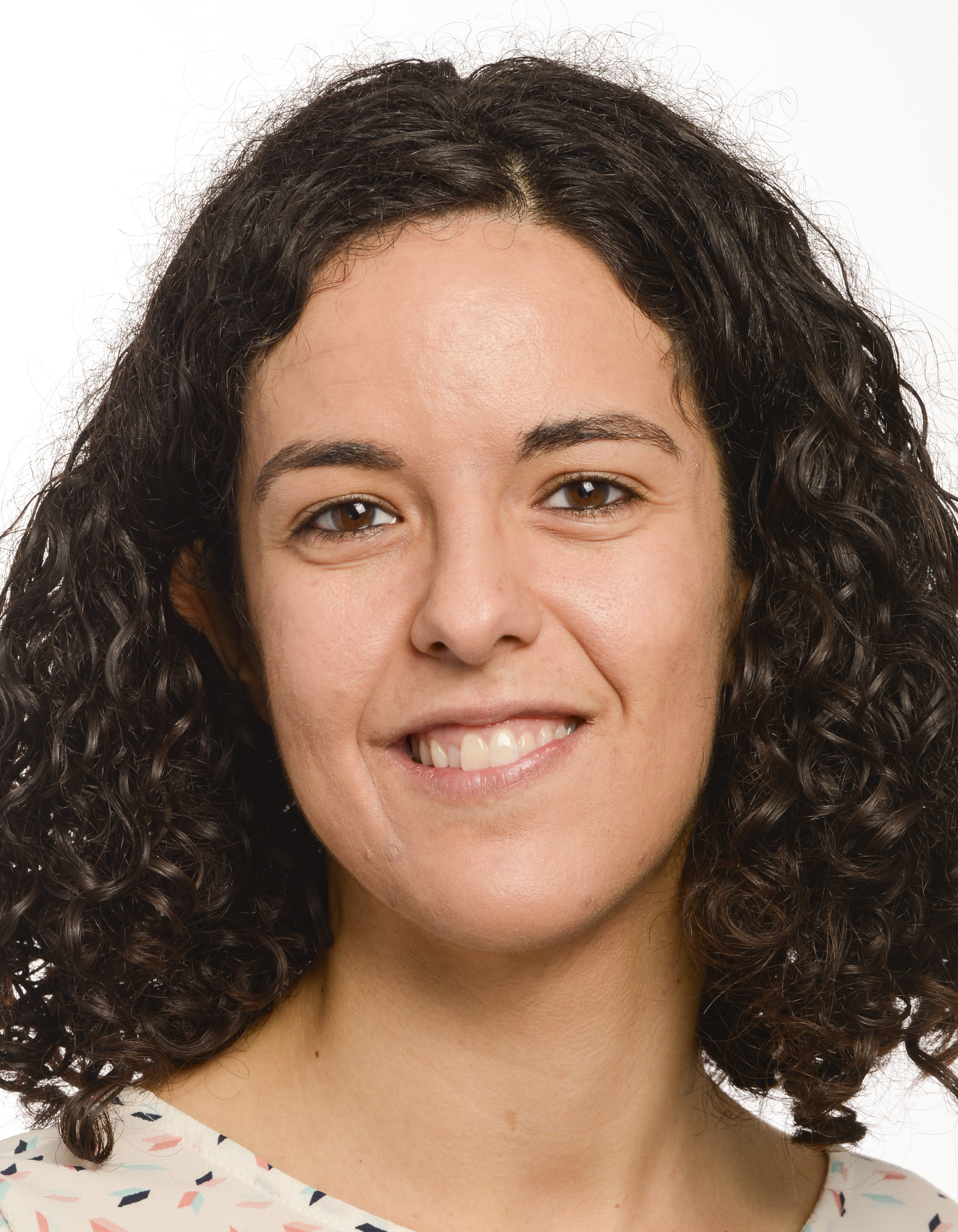

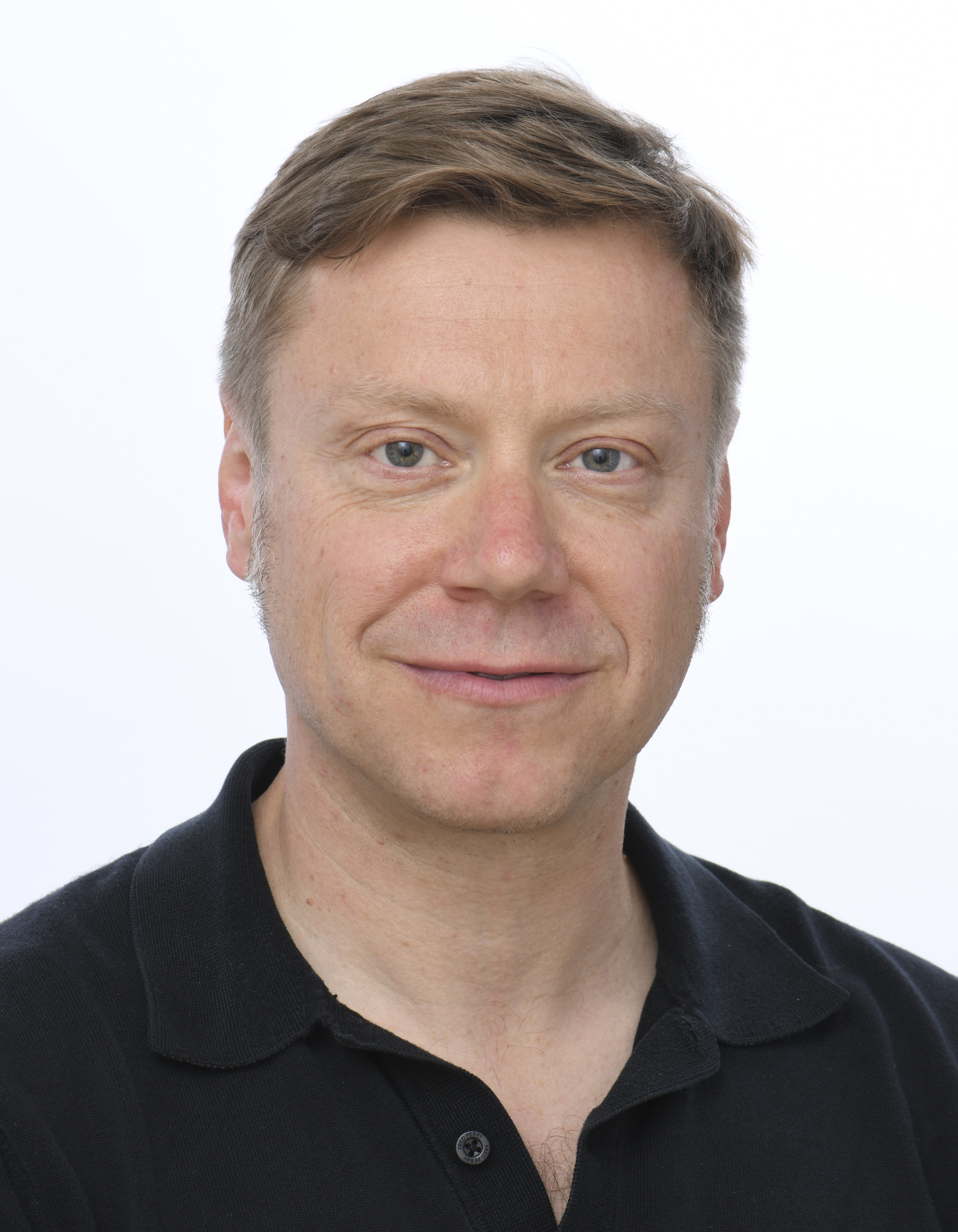

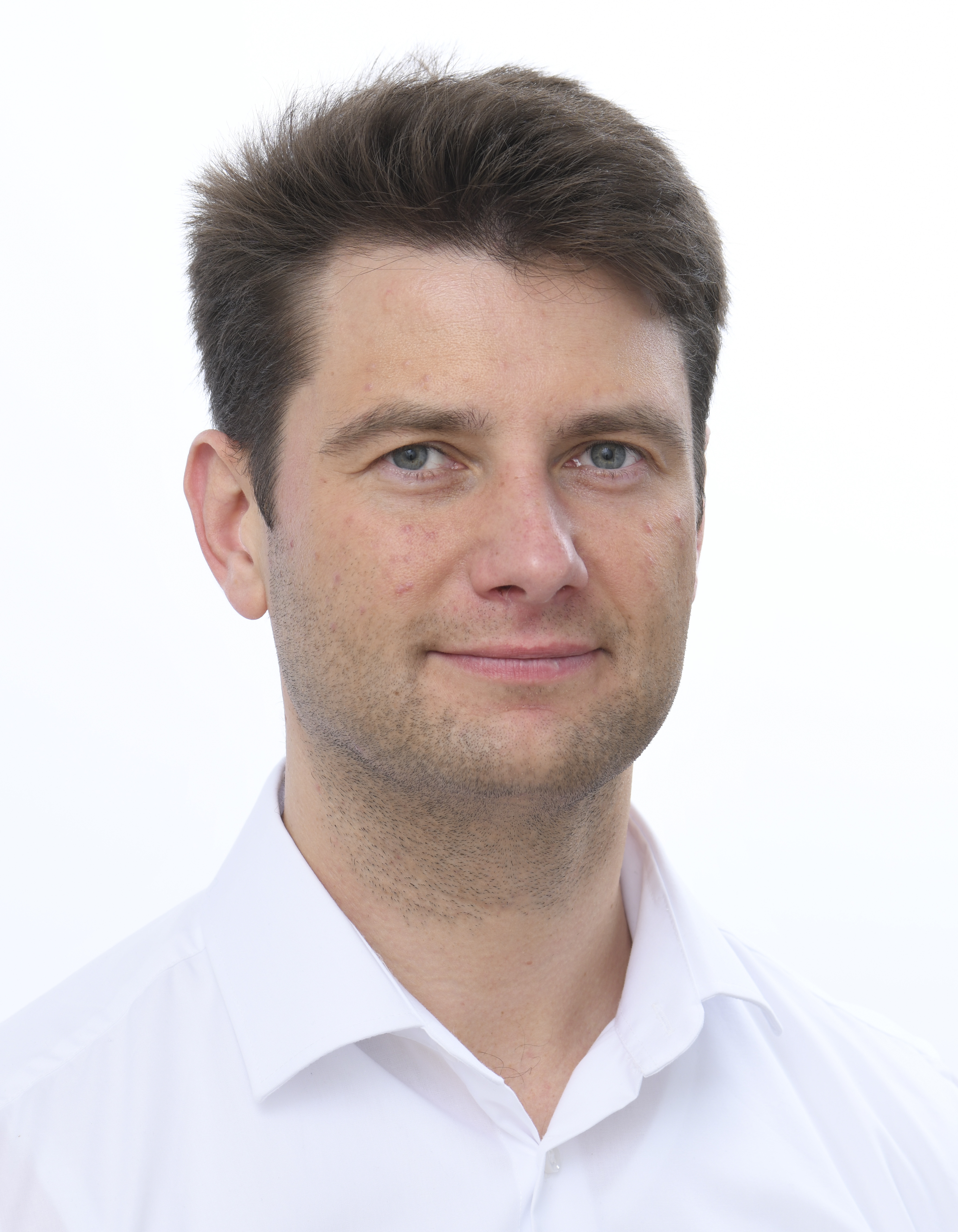

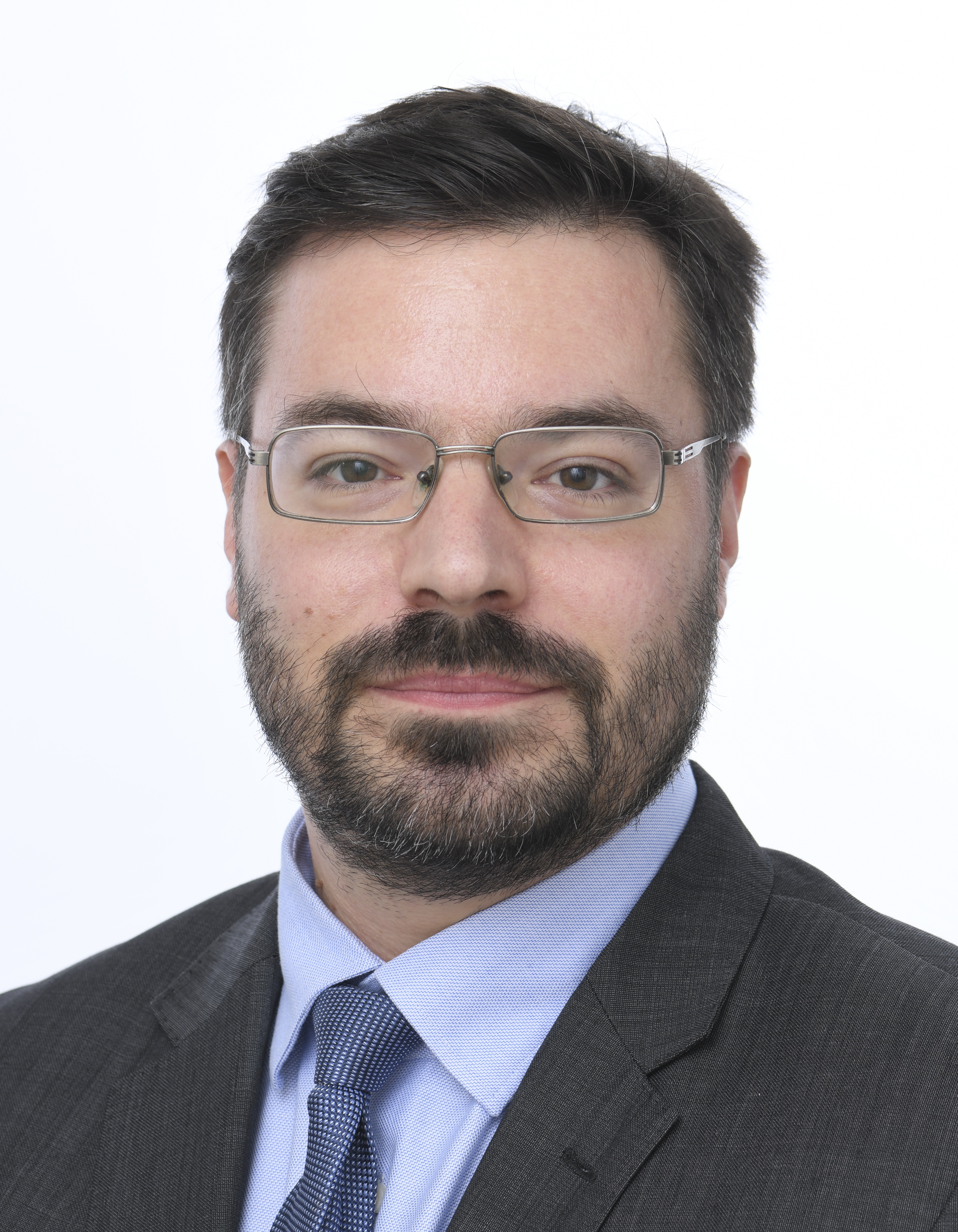
Leader	Manfred Weber	Iratxe García	Jordan Bardella
Alliance	EPP	S&D	PfE
Leader's seat	Germany	Spain	France
Last election	188 seats, 19.6%	136 seats, 15.6%	84 seats, 10.5%
Current seats	185	135	85
Leader	Nicola Procaccini; Patryk Jaki	Valérie Hayer	Bas Eickhout; Terry Reintke
Alliance	ECR	Renew	G/EFA
Leader's seat	Italy; Poland	France	Netherlands; Germany
Last election	78 seats, 8.9%	77 seats, 9.1%	53 seats, 6.6%
Current seats	81	77	53
Leader	Manon Aubry; Martin Schirdewan	René Aust; Stanisław Tyszka
Alliance	The Left	ESN
Leader's seat	France; Germany	Germany; Poland
Last election	46 seats, 6.8%	25 seats, 4.9%
Current seats	44	27
Incumbent President of the European Commission
Ursula von der Leyen
EPP

The next election to the European Parliament is scheduled to be held in 2029.

== Background ==
The 2024 European Parliament election returned incumbent President of the European Commission, Ursula von der Leyen, to power under an informal coalition between the EPP, S&D, ECR, and Renew, with mixed support from Greens/EFA.

=== Von der Leyen Commission II ===
The second Commission of Ursula von der Leyen was approved by the European Parliament on 27 November 2024 with 370 members in favour (51%), making it the least supported Commission ever recorded. The Commissions key policies include a continued commitment to the European Green Deal, a €800 billion defence package dubbed "ReArm Europe" to enhance the military capabilities of the European Union amid heightening global tensions.

==== Votes of no confidence ====
Since the formation of the second Commission, three votes of no confidence have been proposed. The first, proposed in July 2025, was voted down with 360 MEPs against and 175 in favour, with support for the Commission coming primarily from EPP, S&D, Renew, and Greens/EFA. A further two were proposed in October 2025, both being voted down, one with 378 MEPs against and 179 in favour, and the other with 383 MEPs against and 133 in favour.

== Potential enlargement ==
The EU has formally recognised 9 countries as candidates for membership, and 1 country (Kosovo) has applied to be a candidate, however has not been recognised as one yet.

As of March 2026, Montenegro has been a key frontrunner to EU ascension and is likely to be the next EU member state, and is hoped to be incorporated as the 28th member state by the end of 2026 or 2027.

Iceland held a referendum on the resumption of European Union membership negotiations on August 29, with the potential to restart accession negotiations, which were suspended in 2013, by the end of the year. The result saw the No Campaigning winning 52.8%, rejecting the resumption of talks. Iceland's Foreign Minister Þorgerður Katrín Gunnarsdóttir, said that the country would still look to increase security ties with the EU despite the failed referendum.

== Opinion polls ==
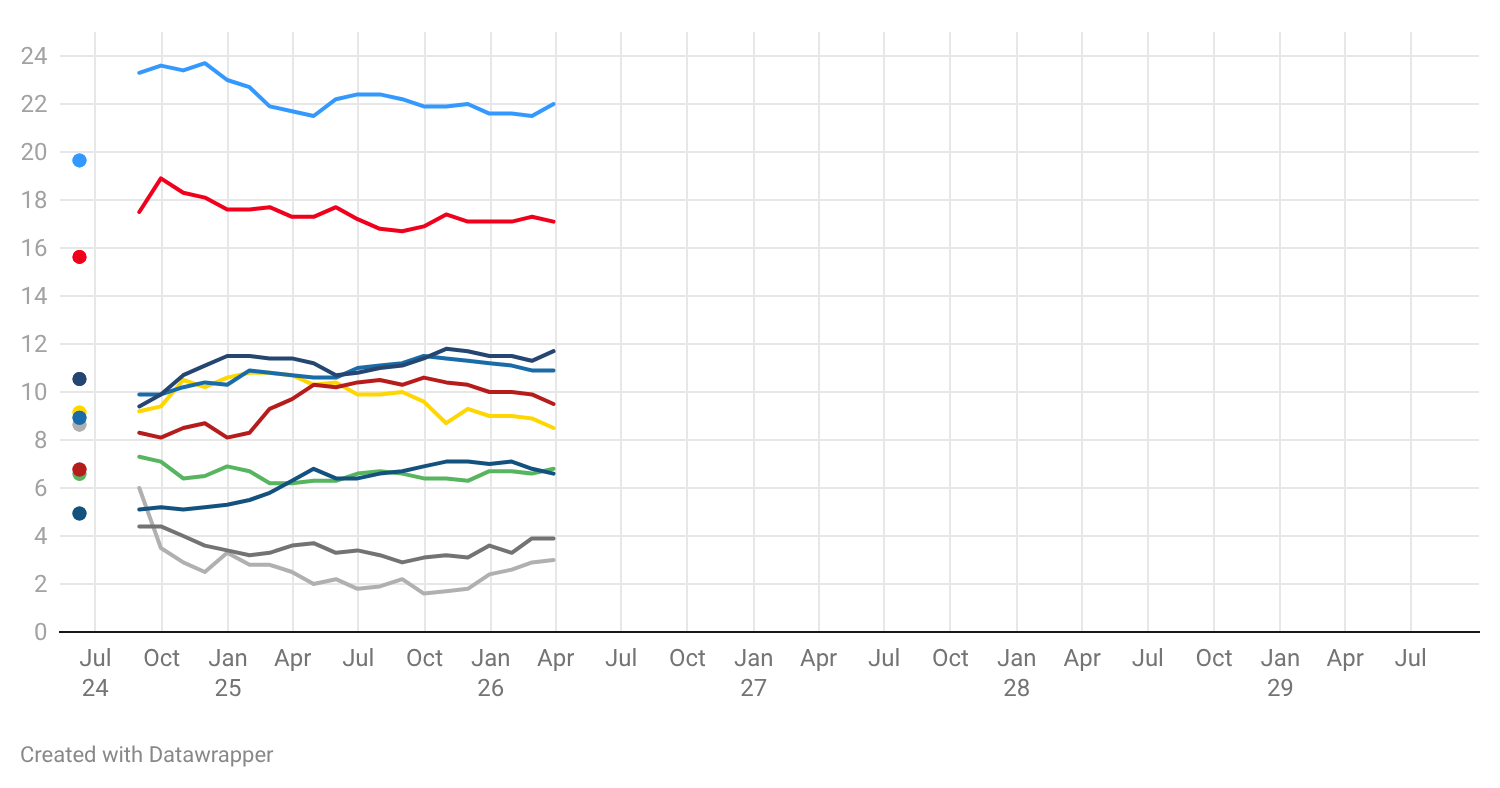
Graph of opinion polling, with popular vote share
