= Joachim Clemens =

German politician (1931–2018)

Member of the Bundestag; from Lower Saxony
- In office 4 November 1980 – 10 November 1994
- Preceded by: Multi-member district
- Succeeded by: Leyla Onur
- Constituency: State list (1980–1983); Braunschweig (1983–1994)

Personal details
- Born: 9 October 1931 Braunschweig, Germany
- Died: 22 June 2018 (aged 86) Braunschweig, Germany
- Party: Christian Democratic Union
- Education: University of Göttingen

Joachim Clemens (9 October 1931 – 22 June 2018) was a German politician of the Christian Democratic Union (CDU) and former member of the German Bundestag.

== Political career ==
Clemens joined the CDU in 1967 and was a member of the Braunschweig city council from 1968 to 1980, where he was also chairman of the CDU parliamentary group from 1969 to 1980. Clemens was elected to the Bundestag in 1980 via the Lower Saxony state list. In his first term of office, he was initially a member of the Legal Affairs Committee and was a deputy member until 1994. From October 1982 to 1983 he was a deputy member of the Committee on Internal Affairs. In the 1983 elections he won a direct mandate in the constituency of Braunschweig.

Clemens was a full member of the Committee on Internal Affairs, which he remained until 1994. He was also a deputy member of the Sports Committee during his first term of office until 1983 and then a full member throughout until 1994. In the 1987 and 1990 Bundestag elections, Clemens was also directly elected to the Bundestag in constituency 45, from which he finally left in 1994.

== Literature ==
Herbst, Ludolf; Jahn, Bruno (2002). Vierhaus, Rudolf (ed.). Biographisches Handbuch der Mitglieder des Deutschen Bundestages. 1949–2002 [Biographical Handbook of the Members of the German Bundestag. 1949–2002] (in German). München: De Gruyter - De Gruyter Saur. p. 1715. ISBN 978-3-11-184511-1.
