= Christos Pantazis =

German politician

Christos Pantazis MdB
- Pantazis in 2021

Member of the Bundestag; for Braunschweig
- Incumbent
- Assumed office 26 October 2021
- Preceded by: Marja-Liisa Völlers

Member of the Landtag of Lower Saxony; for Braunschweig-Nord
- In office 19 February 2013 – 11 November 2021
- Preceded by: Lutz Stratmann
- Succeeded by: Gerd Ludwig Will

Personal details
- Born: 9 October 1975 (age 51) Hannover, West Germany
- Party: Social Democratic
- Education: Hannover Medical School; University of Basel; University of Ioannina

Christos Pantazis (born 9 October 1975) is a German politician for the SPD who has been serving as a member of the Bundestag for Braunschweig since the 2021 German federal election.

== Early life and career ==
Pantazis was born 1975 in the West German city of Hanover to Greek parents. He studied medicine and became a doctor.

== Political career ==
Pantazis joined the Social Democratic Party of Germany in 1998 and was directly elected to the Bundestag in 2021. Since the 2025 elections, he has been his parliamentary group's spokesperson on health policy.
