= Otto Arnholz =

German politician (1894–1988)

Member of the Bundestag; for Stadt Braunschweig
- In office 7 September 1949 – 15 October 1957
- Preceded by: Constituency established
- Succeeded by: Hermann Koch

Personal details
- Born: 12 April 1894 Berlin, Germany
- Died: 7 October 1988 (aged 94) Braunschweig, West Germany
- Party: Social Democratic
- Education: FWU Berlin

Otto Arnholz (12 April 1894 – 7 October 1988) was a German politician of the Social Democratic Party (SPD) and member of the German Bundestag.

== Political career ==
Arnholz joined the SPD in 1920. In 1945/46 he was the regional chairman of the SPD Braunschweig and became a member of the appointed Braunschweig state parliament from 21 February 1946 to 21 November 1946. In May 1946, Arnholz became Minister of the Interior in the government of Prime Minister Alfred Kubel. With the formation of the state of Lower Saxony he left the government in November 1946. He was a member of the German Bundestag from its first election in 1949 to 1957. In parliament he represented the constituency of the city of Braunschweig.

== Literature ==
Herbst, Ludolf; Jahn, Bruno (2002). Vierhaus, Rudolf (ed.). Biographisches Handbuch der Mitglieder des Deutschen Bundestages. 1949–2002 [Biographical Handbook of the Members of the German Bundestag. 1949–2002] (in German). München: De Gruyter - De Gruyter Saur. p. 1715. ISBN 978-3-11-184511-1.
