= Nadja Hirsch =

German politician (born 1978)

Nadja Yvonne Hirsch
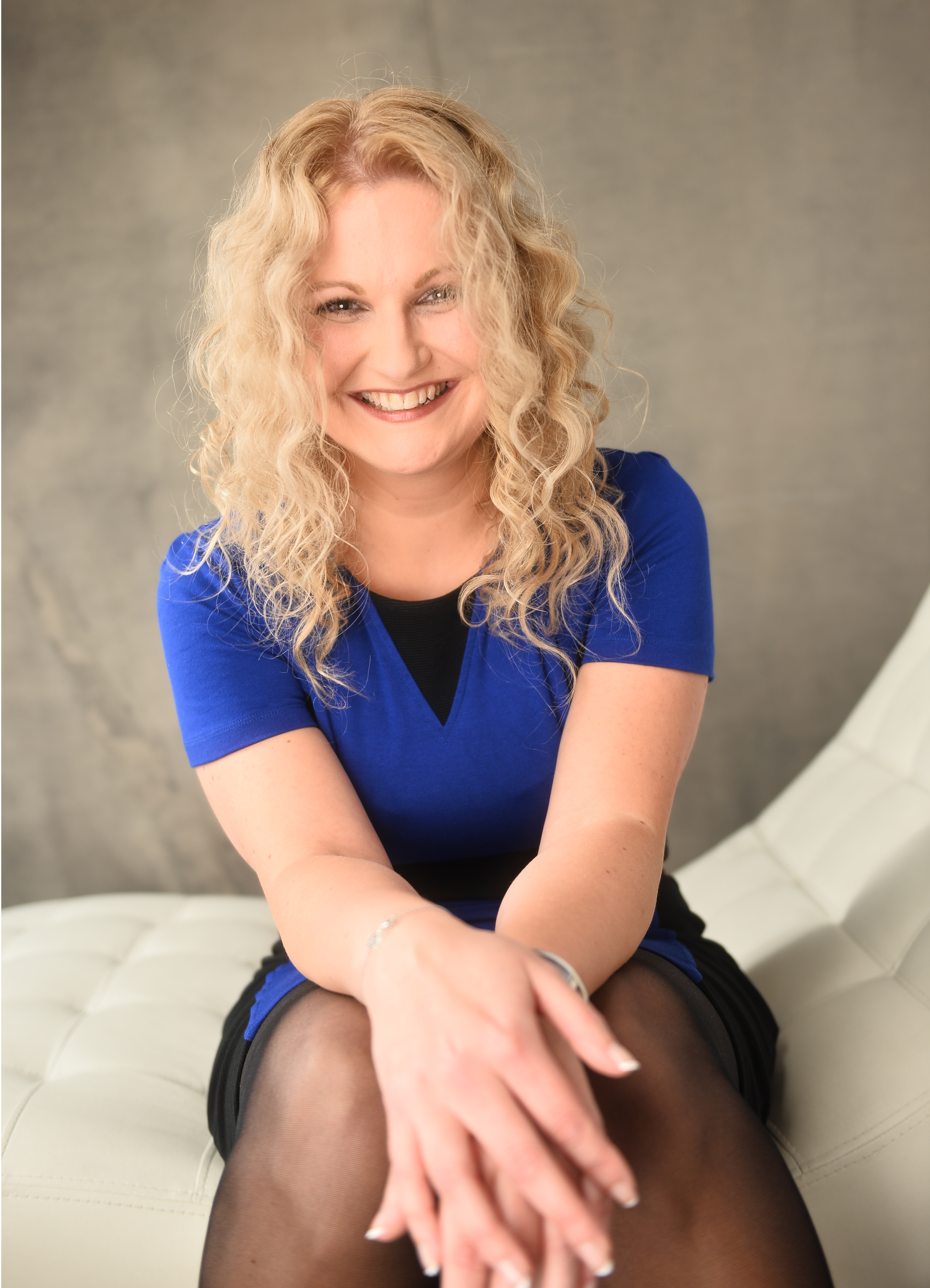
- Nadja Hirsch

Member of the European Parliament
- In office 2009–2014
- In office 2017–2019

Personal details
- Born: 13 July 1978 (age 48) Munich, Bavaria
- Party: German: Free Democratic Party; EU: Alliance of Liberals and Democrats for Europe
- Education: LMU Munich
- Profession: Psychologist
- Website: https://nadjahirsch.de/

Nadja Yvonne Hirsch (born 13 July 1978) is a German politician who served as a Member of the European Parliament (MEP) for the Free Democratic Party of Germany, part of the Alliance of Liberals and Democrats for Europe, from 2009 until 2014 and from 2017 until 2019.

== Education and career ==
Hirsch was born in Munich. In 1998, she obtained her university entry level qualification (Abitur) from Edith-Stein-Gymnasium in Munich. From 2001 to 2003, she was a Scholar of the Friedrich Naumann Foundation. In 2005, she graduated in psychology from LMU Munich and went on to study economics at FernUniversität Hagen. She then worked as a freelance psychologist and mediator and in 2007 entered the International Visitor Leadership Program of the United States Department of State.

== Political career ==
Hirsch became a member of the Free Democratic Party of Germany and of the Young Liberals in 1999. She was a member of the city council of Munich from 2002 to 2009. From 2008 to 2009 she also chaired the parliamentary group of the Free Democratic Party of Germany in the city council.

In 2009 Hirsch was elected to the European Parliament as the leading candidate of the Free Democratic Party in Bavaria and number 9 on the Federal list of candidates. A member of the parliamentary group Alliance of Liberals and Democrats for Europe, she served as vice-chairperson of the European Parliament Committee on Employment and Social Affairs and as substitute in the Committee on Culture and Education. In addition to her committee assignments, Hirsch was a member of the Delegation for relations with the US, the Delegation for relations with the Arab Peninsula and the Delegation for relations with the countries of South Asia.

Having missed re-election in 2014, Hirsch returned to the private sector and took on a position as deputy managing director at Handelsblatt Global Edition. She later worked as Head of Communications at Raisin, a European fintech company. In 2017, she set up her own startup, Coachoo, in Munich.

In November 2017, Hirsch again became a Member of the European Parliament, after her party colleague Alexander Graf Lambsdorff had been elected to the Bundestag in the German elections. She served on the Committee on International Trade. In addition, she was a member of the Parliament’s delegation to the Turkey-EU Joint Parliamentary Committee (JPC). In January 2019 she did not win a nomination for the elections in May of the same year.
