= Ludwig Hartenfels =

German politician (1894 –1955)

Ludwig Hartenfels (born June 17, 1894, in Kreuznach; died April 6, 1955, in Hamburg) was a German politician (FDP).

== Early life and career ==
Hartenfels, a professional advertising executive, was one of the co-founders of the Free Democrats party after World War II in 1945, which later became the Hamburg state association of the FDP. On July 27, 1946, he was elected to the executive board of the Hamburg Liberals. Additionally, he was a member of the executive board of the FDP in the British occupation zone, from which he resigned in 1947. In the 1946 state election, he ran in the Fuhlsbüttel-Langenhorn-Ohlsdorf constituency but failed to secure any of the four mandates available there. Hartenfels joined the Hamburg Senate under Max Brauer on November 15, 1946, and was sent as a presiding member to the Cultural Authority. He resigned from his position on November 1, 1949, shortly after the state election, in which the FDP ran together with the CDU and DKP as the 'Vaterstädtischer Bund Hamburg.' In the 1949 state election, he didn't run on the state list but only in the Wellingsbüttel constituency, which he couldn't win despite the electoral alliance.

In September 1950, Hartenfels left the party due to the right-wing direction of the FDP in Hesse and North Rhine-Westphalia. However, after the FDP Hamburg firmly opposed this right-wing course at a meeting of its regional committee on January 20, 1951, he re-joined the party two days later, citing the goal of 'strengthening the liberal course.' From 1953 to 1955, Hartenfels served as the German Consul in Glasgow.

== Literature ==
- Christof Brauers: Die FDP in Hamburg 1945 bis 1953. Start als bürgerliche Linkspartei (= Vereinigung Demokratische Offenheit. DemOkrit. 3). Mit einem Vorwort von Hildegard Hamm-Brücher, Martin Meidenbauer Verlagsbuchhandlung, München 2007, ISBN 978-3-89975-569-5.
