= Carsten Müller =

German lawyer and politician (born 1970)

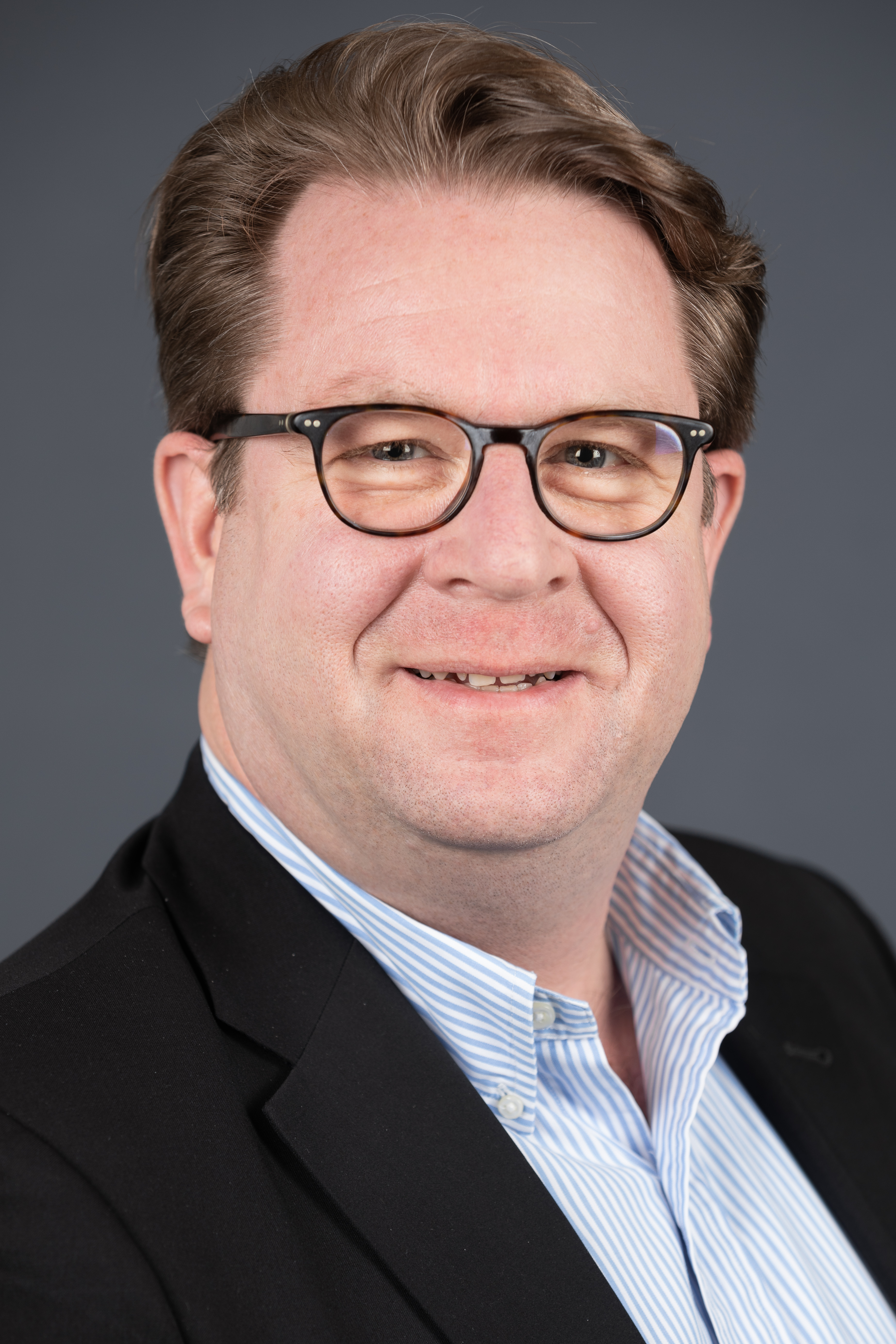

Member of the Bundestag
- Incumbent
- Assumed office 2005

Personal details
- Born: 8 May 1970 (age 55) Braunschweig, Lower Saxony, West Germany (now Germany)
- Citizenship: German
- Party: CDU

Carsten Müller (born 8 May 1970 in Braunschweig) is a German lawyer and politician of the Christian Democratic Union (CDU).

== Early life and career ==
After finishing school in 1989 at Gymnasium Kleine Burg in Braunschweig, Müller graduated to 1991 as a banker and in 1992 began to study law in the Georg-August-University Goettingen, completing his course in 1998. From 1992 to 1999 he was on the alternative military service in the Technical Relief. In 2001 he was fully qualified as a lawyer and from 2003 to 2006, he also took the management of a medium-sized company in the meat industry.

== Political career ==
=== Career in state politics ===
As a student in 1986 Müller joined the Young Union and from 1989 to 1990 was the CDU Chairman of the Student Union in Lower Saxony. From 1990 to 1992 and again since 2000, he has belonged to the Land executive of CDU Braunschweig and since 1998 has also been vice-chairman of the CDU for the district of Braunschweig.

=== Member of the German Parliament, 2005–2009; 2013-present ===
Since the 2005 elections, Müller has been member of the Bundestag. In parliament, he first served on the Committee on Education, Research and Technology Assessment before moving to the Committee on the Environment, Nature Conservation, Building and Nuclear Safety. On the latter committee, he was his parliamentary group's rapporteur on the environmental aspects of transport policy. Since 2018, he has been serving as member of the Committee on Economic Affairs and Energy; the Committee on Legal Affairs and Consumer Protection; and the Committee for the Scrutiny of Elections, Immunity and the Rules of Procedure. On the Committee on Legal Affairs and Consumer Protection, he is his parliamentary group's rapporteur on digital issues.

In addition to his committee assignments, Müller is a member of the Parliamentary Friendship Group for Relations with the Baltic States. In 2009, he joined Andreas Scheuer in initiating a cross-party group for the protection of antique cars.

== Other activities (selection) ==
=== Corporate boards ===
- Kraftverkehr Mundstock, Chairman of the Supervisory Board
- Minol Messtechnik W. Lehmann, Member of the Advisory Board
- Braunschweiger Verkehrs-GmbH, Chairman of the Supervisory Board (–2016)
- Cleanventure AG, Member of the Supervisory Board (–2014)

=== Non-profits ===
- German Industry Initiative for Energy Efficiency (DENEFF), Chairman
- Verein Mittelständischer Dienstleistungsunternehmen (VMDU), Chairman
- Association of German Foundations, Member of the Parliamentary Advisory Board (2005–2009)
- Federal Agency for Civic Education, Alternate Member of the Board of Trustees (2005–2009)

== Political positions ==
In June 2017, Müller voted against his parliamentary group's majority and in favor of Germany's introduction of same-sex marriage.

== See also ==
- List of German Christian Democratic Union politicians
