= Willem Schuth =

Dutch politician and former Member of the European Parliament (born 1954)

Willem Schuth (born 14 June 1954 in Assen) is a Dutch politician and former Member of the European Parliament for Germany with the Free Democratic Party of Germany, part of the Alliance of Liberals and Democrats for Europe and sits on the European Parliament's Committee on Agriculture and Rural Development.

He is a substitute for the Committee on Transport and Tourism, a member of the Delegation for relations with Switzerland, Iceland and Norway and to the European Economic Area (EEA) Joint Parliamentary Committee and a substitute for the Delegation to the EU-Turkey Joint Parliamentary Committee.

== Education ==
- 1975-1976 military service in the Netherlands
- 1977-1979 worked in the Netherlands Defence Ministry
- 1979-2004 Netherlands Defence Ministry official, Seedorf Barracks, Germany
- 1996: Joined the FDP
- since 1998 Elbe-Weser FDP District Vice-Chairman
- since 2001 Member of the Federal Committee on International Policy
- since 2002 Member of the Lower Saxony FDP Regional Executive
- since 2003 Member of the ELDR Council
- Member of the Naturschutzbund Deutschland (NABU) (nature conservation)
