= Daniel Karrais =

German politician (born 1990)

Member of the Landtag of Baden-Württemberg
- Incumbent
- Assumed office 13 November 2018
- Preceded by: Gerhard Aden
- Constituency: Rottweil

Personal details
- Born: 12 May 1990 (age 36) Tübingen
- Party: Free Democratic Party (since 2009)

Daniel Karrais (born 12 May 1990 in Tübingen) is a German politician serving as a member of the Landtag of Baden-Württemberg since 2018. He has served as chairman of the environment, climate and energy committee since 2021.
