= Lotte Friese-Korn =

German politician (1899–1963)

Member of the Bundestag
- In office 6 October 1953 – 15 October 1961

Personal details
- Born: 1 September 1899 Halle
- Died: 14 October 1963 (aged 64)
- Party: FDP

Lotte FrieseKorn (1 September 1899 – 14 October 1963) was a German politician of the Free Democratic Party (FDP) and former member of the German Bundestag.

== Life ==
She was a member of the state parliament in North Rhine-Westphalia from 1947 to 1954. Friese-Korn was a member of the German Bundestag from 1953 to 1961. She had stood as a candidate in the Bundestag elections on 6 September 1953 in the constituency of 82 Rheydt-Mönchengladbach-Viersen and entered the Bundestag via the state list.

== Literature ==
Herbst, Ludolf; Jahn, Bruno (2002). Vierhaus, Rudolf (ed.). Biographisches Handbuch der Mitglieder des Deutschen Bundestages. 1949–2002 [Biographical Handbook of the Members of the German Bundestag. 1949–2002] (in German). München: De Gruyter - De Gruyter Saur. p. 1715. ISBN 978-3-11-184511-1.
