= Otto Dowidat =

German politician

Member of the Bundestag
- In office 15 October 1957 – 15 October 1961

Personal details
- Born: 27 October 1896 Remscheid
- Died: 4 July 1975 (aged 78)
- Party: FDP

Otto Dowidat (27 October 1896 – 4 July 1975) was a German politician of the Free Democratic Party (FDP) and former member of the German Bundestag.

== Life ==
Dowidat was a member of the German Bundestag from 1957 to 1961. He entered the Bundestag via the North Rhine-Westphalia state list.

== Literature ==
Herbst, Ludolf; Jahn, Bruno (2002). Vierhaus, Rudolf (ed.). Biographisches Handbuch der Mitglieder des Deutschen Bundestages. 1949–2002 [Biographical Handbook of the Members of the German Bundestag. 1949–2002] (in German). München: De Gruyter - De Gruyter Saur. p. 1715. ISBN 978-3-11-184511-1.
