= Roland Zielke =

German politician (born 1946)

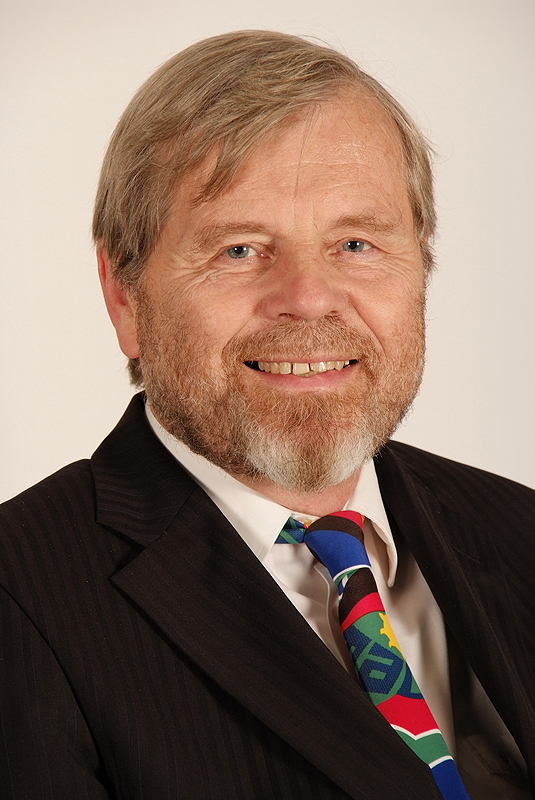
Roland Zielke Nov. 2009

Roland Zielke (born 30 July 1946 in Opladen) is a German politician for the Free Democratic Party.

He studied mathematics in Cologne, Columbus and Konstanz. He received his doctor in mathematics in 1971. He went on to study medicine in Münster and received his doctorate in medicine in 1988. From 1975 to 2003 he was professor for applied mathematics at Osnabrück University.

He was elected to the Landtag of Lower Saxony in 2003, and has been re-elected on one occasion. He was member of the Landtag from 2003 to 2013.
