= Anikó Glogowski-Merten =

German politician (born 1982)

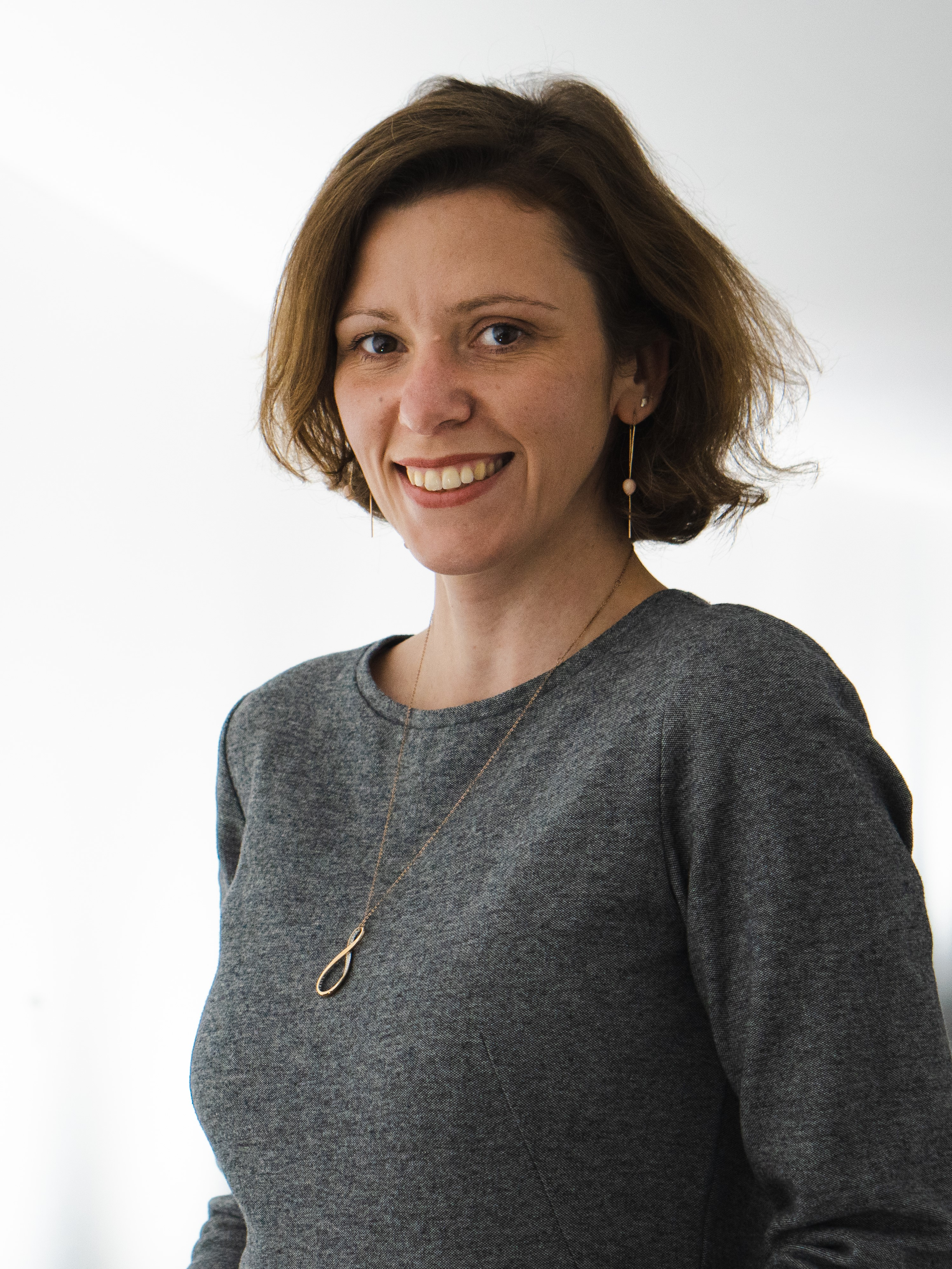

Member of the Bundestag for Baden-Württemberg
- In office 2021–2025
- Constituency: FDP List

Personal details
- Born: 25 March 1982 (age 44) Havelberg, East Germany (now Germany)
- Party: Free Democratic Party

Aniko Glogowski-Merten (born 25 March 1982) is a German teacher and politician of the Free Democratic Party (FDP) who served as a member of the Bundestag from 2021 to 2025.

== Early life and education ==
Merten was born in 1982 in the East German town of Havelberg. She studied at the Otto von Guericke University Magdeburg (2001–2007), the Braunschweig University of Art (2007–2010) and the Technical University of Braunschweig (2007–2010).

== Political career ==
Merten became member of the FDP in 2013.

Merten became member of the Bundestag in 2021, representing the Braunschweig district. In parliament, she served on the Committee on Cultural and Media Affairs, the Committee on Climate Action and Energy and the Committee on Foreign Affairs. In addition to her committee assignments, she co-chaired the German Parliamentary Friendship Group for Relations with the States of Central Asia.

== Personal life ==
In 2022, Merten married Robert Glogowski, the son of Gerhard Glogowski.
