= Member of the European Parliament =

Elected politician

A member of the European Parliament (MEP) is a person who has been elected to serve as a popular representative in the European Parliament.

When the European Parliament (then known as the Common Assembly of the European Coal and Steel Community) first met in 1952, its members were directly appointed by the governments of member states from among those already sitting in their own national parliaments. Since 1979, however, MEPs have been elected by direct universal suffrage every five years. Each member state establishes its own method for electing MEPs – and in some states this has changed over time – but the system chosen must be a form of proportional representation. Some member states elect their MEPs to represent a single national constituency; other states apportion seats to sub-national regions for election.

There may also be non-voting observers when a new country is seeking membership of the European Union.

== Election ==
From 1 January 2007, when Romania and Bulgaria joined the EU, there were 785 MEPs, but their number was reduced to 736 at the elections in 2009. With effect from the elections held in May 2014 the number had risen to 751. This reduced to 705 members after the withdrawal of the United Kingdom from the European Union in January 2020, with each member state between 6 and 96 MEPs. From the 2024 elections, there are 720 members.

Elections are held once every five years, on the basis of universal suffrage. There is no uniform voting system for the election of MEPs; rather, each member state is free to choose its own system, subject to three restrictions:

- The system must be a form of proportional representation, under either the party list or single transferable vote system.
- The electoral area may be subdivided if this will not generally affect the proportional nature of the voting system.
- Any election threshold on the national level must not exceed five per cent.

The allocation of seats to each member state is based on the principle of degressive proportionality, so that, while the size of the population of each nation is taken into account, smaller states elect more MEPs than would be strictly justified by their populations alone. As the number of MEPs granted to each member state has arisen from treaty negotiations, there is no precise formula for the apportionment of seats. No change in this configuration can occur without the unanimous consent of all national governments.

=== Length of service ===
The European Parliament has a high turnover of members compared to some national parliaments. After every recent election, just over half of elected members had not been members in the previous parliament. Elmar Brok served the longest continuous term from the first elections in 1979 until 2019 (40 years).

== Seats in the European Parliament ==
Election year	Seats
1979	410
1984	434
1989	518
1994	567
1999	626
2004	732
2009	736
2014	751
2019	751
2024	720
2029	720

== MEPs within the Parliament ==
Members of the 10th European Parliament: EPP (185); S&D (135); PfE (85); ECR (80); Renew (78); Greens/EFA (53); The Left (45); ESN (26); Non-Inscrits (29)

MEPs organise themselves into cross-national political groups, except for a few non-attached members known as Non-Inscrits who choose not to join a Group (or no Group wants them). The two largest groups are the European People's Party Group (EPP Group) and the Socialists & Democrats (S&D). These two groups have dominated the Parliament for much of its life, continuously holding between 40 and 70 per cent of the seats together. No single group has ever held a majority in Parliament. As a result of being broad alliances of national parties, European groups parties are decentralised and hence have more in common with parties in federal states like Germany or the United States than unitary states like the majority of the EU states. Although, the European groups, between 2004 and 2009, were actually more cohesive than their US counterparts.

Aside from working through their groups, individual members are also guaranteed a number of individual powers and rights within the Parliament:

- the right to vote on all legislative proposals, the EU budget and all other items placed before the Parliament.
- the right to table a motion for resolution
- the right to put questions to the Council of the European Union, the Commission, and to the leaders of the Parliament
- the right to table an amendment to any text in committee or (jointly with others) in plenary
- the right to make explanations of vote
- the right to raise points of order
- the right to move the inadmissibility of a matter

== Job of an MEP ==
Every month except August the Parliament meets in Strasbourg for a four-day plenary session. For the rest of the time, it is based in Brussels, where some six supplementary plenary sessions are held for two days each, and where the Parliament's committees, political groups, and other organs also mainly meet. The obligation to spend one week a month in Strasbourg was imposed on Parliament by the member state governments at the 1992 European Council meeting in Edinburgh.

== Payment and privileges ==
The total cost of the European Parliament is approximately €2.247 billion per year according to its 2023 budget, with the cost of translation and interpretation, and the cost of its buildings in two main locations, being significant extra burdens not faced by national parliaments.

=== Salary ===
Until 2009, MEPs were paid (by their own Member State) exactly the same salary as a member of the lower House of their own national parliament. As a result, there was a wide range of salaries in the European Parliament. In 2002, Italian MEPs earned €130,000, while Spanish MEPs earned less than a quarter of that at €32,000.

However, in July 2005, the Council agreed to a single statute for all MEPs, following a proposal by the Parliament. Thus, since the 2009 elections, all MEPs receive a monthly pre-tax salary set at 38.5 per cent of that of a judge at the European Court of Justice. As of 1 July 2019, the monthly salary is of €8,932.86, or just over €107,000 per year. MEPs also receive a general expenditure allowance of €4,563 per month.

The single statute represented a pay cut for MEPs from some member states (e.g. Italy, Germany and Austria), a rise for others (particularly the low-paid eastern European members) and status quo for those from the United Kingdom, until January 2020 (depending on the euro-pound exchange rate). The much-criticised expenses arrangements were also partially reformed.

=== Financial interests ===
Members declare their financial interests to prevent any conflicts of interest. These declarations are published in a register and are available on the Internet. They must also make a detailed declaration of private interests, listing their memberships of company boards, associations, and public bodies (including those held during the three years prior to their election). They must also publish on-line all meetings that they have had with lobbyists and representatives of third country governments. They may not accept gifts, other than courtesy gifts valued at less than €150. They must declare all sources of outside income if their total outside income exceeds €5000.

=== Immunities ===
Under the protocol on the privileges and immunities of the European Union, MEPs in their home state receive the same immunities as their own national parliamentarians. In other member states, MEPs are immune from detention and from legal proceedings, except when caught in the act of committing an offence. This immunity may be waived by application to the European Parliament by the authorities of the member state in question.

== Individual members ==
=== Members' experience ===
Around a third of MEPs have previously held national parliamentary mandates, and over 10 per cent have ministerial experience at a national level. There are usually a number of former prime ministers and former members of the European Commission. Many other MEPs have held office at a regional or local level in their home states.

Current MEPs also include former judges, trade union leaders, media personalities, actors, soldiers, singers, athletes, and political activists.

Many outgoing MEPs move into other political office. Several presidents, prime ministers or deputy prime ministers of member states are former MEPs, including former presidents of France Nicolas Sarkozy, François Hollande, Jacques Chirac and François Mitterrand, the former Deputy PM of the United Kingdom Nick Clegg, Danish former Prime Minister Helle Thorning-Schmidt, and Belgian former PM Elio Di Rupo.

=== Dual mandates ===
A dual mandate, in which an individual is a member of both their national parliament and the European Parliament, was officially discouraged by a growing number of political parties and member states, and is prohibited as of 2009. In the 2004–2009 Parliament, a small number of members still held a dual mandate. Ian Paisley, John Taylor and John Hume once held triple mandates as MEP, Member of Parliament in the House of Commons, and Members of the Northern Ireland Assembly simultaneously.

=== Gender ===
Evolution of the proportion of women and men in the European Parliament View source data.

Women are generally under-represented in politics and public life in the EU, as well as in national parliaments, governments and local assemblies. The percentage of women in the EU parliament has increased from 15.2 per cent after the first European Parliament election in 1979 to 41 per cent after 2019 European Parliament election. To reach gender parity, women should hold 50 per cent of seats and positions of power. However, according to the goal set by the European Institute for Gender Equality, a ratio between 40 and 60 per cent is considered acceptable.

After the 2014 European Parliament election, 11 countries of 28 reached this goal in their own quota of elected candidates. While in nine EU countries there were mechanisms in place to facilitate female representation, only in four of these countries did women exceeded 40 per cent of elected candidates. On the other hand, in eight countries this goal was reached despite the absence of such systems. The FEMM Committee requested a study exploring the results of the election in terms of gender balance. EU institutions have focused on how to achieve a better gender balance (at least 40 per cent) or gender parity (50 per cent) in the next Parliament, and for other high-level posts in other institutions.

In the 2019 elections 308 female MEPs were elected (41 per cent). Sweden elected the highest percentage of female MEPs: 55 per cent. Overall, thirteen countries elected 45 to 55 per cent female MEPs, with seven countries reaching exactly 50 per cent. On the other hand, Cyprus has elected zero women, and Slovakia elected only 15 per cent. Other Eastern European countries, namely Romania, Greece, Lithuania and Bulgaria, all elected fewer than 30 per cent female MEPs. Eight member states elected a lower number of women in 2019 than in 2014. Malta, Cyprus and Estonia lost the most female representation in the EU parliament, dropping by 17 percentage points, while Slovakia dropped by 16. However, despite the drop, Malta still elected 50 per cent women in 2019. Cyprus dropped from 17 per cent in 2014 to zero women this year, while Estonia dropped from 50 to 33 per cent. Hungary, Lithuania and Luxembourg made the greatest gains (19, 18 and 17 percentage points respectively) when we compare 2019 with 2014, followed by Slovenia and Latvia, both increasing their percentage of women MEPs by 13 points. Luxembourg, Slovenia and Latvia all elected 50 per cent female MEPs.

=== Age ===
As of 2019, the youngest MEP is Kira Marie Peter-Hansen of Denmark, who was 21 at the start of the July 2019 session, and is also the youngest person ever elected to the European Parliament. The oldest MEP to date has been Manolis Glezos, who was aged 91 when elected (for the second time) in 2014, and 92 at his final resignation in 2015.

== Election of non-nationals ==
European citizens are eligible for election in the member state where they reside (subject to the residence requirements of that state); they do not have to be a national of that state. The following citizens have been elected in a state other than their native country;

Name	Year (first election)	Nationality	State of election	Party
Christine Crawley	1984	Irish	UK	Socialist
Anita Pollack	1989	Australian	UK	Socialist
Maurice Duverger	1989	French	Italy	GUE
Wilmya Zimmermann	1994	Dutch	Germany	Socialist
Olivier Dupuis	1994	Belgian	Italy	Radical
Daniel Cohn-Bendit	1999	German	France	Green
Monica Frassoni	1999	Italian	Belgium	Green
Miquel Mayol i Raynal	2001	French	Spain	Green
Bairbre de Brún	2004	Irish	UK	The Left
Willem Schuth	2004	Dutch	Germany	Liberal
Kathy Sinnott	2004	American	Ireland	IND/DEM
Daniel Strož	2004	German	Czech Republic	GUE
Ari Vatanen	2004	Finnish	France	EPP
Derk Jan Eppink	2009	Dutch	Belgium	ECR
Marta Andreasen	2009	Spanish	UK	EFD
Anna Maria Corazza Bildt	2009	Italian	Sweden	EPP
Konstantina Kouneva	2014	Bulgarian	Greece	The Left
Henrik Overgaard-Nielsen	2019	Danish	UK	NI
Sandro Gozi	2019	Italian	France	Renew
Caroline Roose	2019	Belgian	France	Green
Christian Allard	2019	French	UK	EFA
Barbara Gibson	2019	American	UK	Renew
Fredis Beleris	2024	Albanian and Greek	Greece	EPP
Catarina Vieira	2024	Portuguese	Netherlands	Green

== Observers ==
It is conventional for countries acceding to the European Union to send a number of observers to Parliament in advance. The number of observers and their method of appointment (usually by national parliaments) is laid down in the joining countries' Treaties of Accession.

Observers may attend debates and take part by invitation, but they may not vote or exercise other official duties. When the countries then become full member states, these observers become full MEPs for the interim period between accession and the next European elections. From 26 September 2005 to 31 December 2006, Bulgaria had 18 observers in Parliament and Romania 35. These were selected from government and opposition parties as agreed by the countries' national parliaments. Following accession on 1 January 2007, the observers became MEPs (with some personnel changes). Similarly, Croatia had 12 observer members from 17 April 2012, appointed by the Croatian parliament in preparation for its accession in 2013.

== See also ==
- EUobserver
- Apportionment in the European Parliament
- Category:Members of the European Parliament
- List of current members of the European Parliament
