= Steven Wink =

German politician (born 1984)

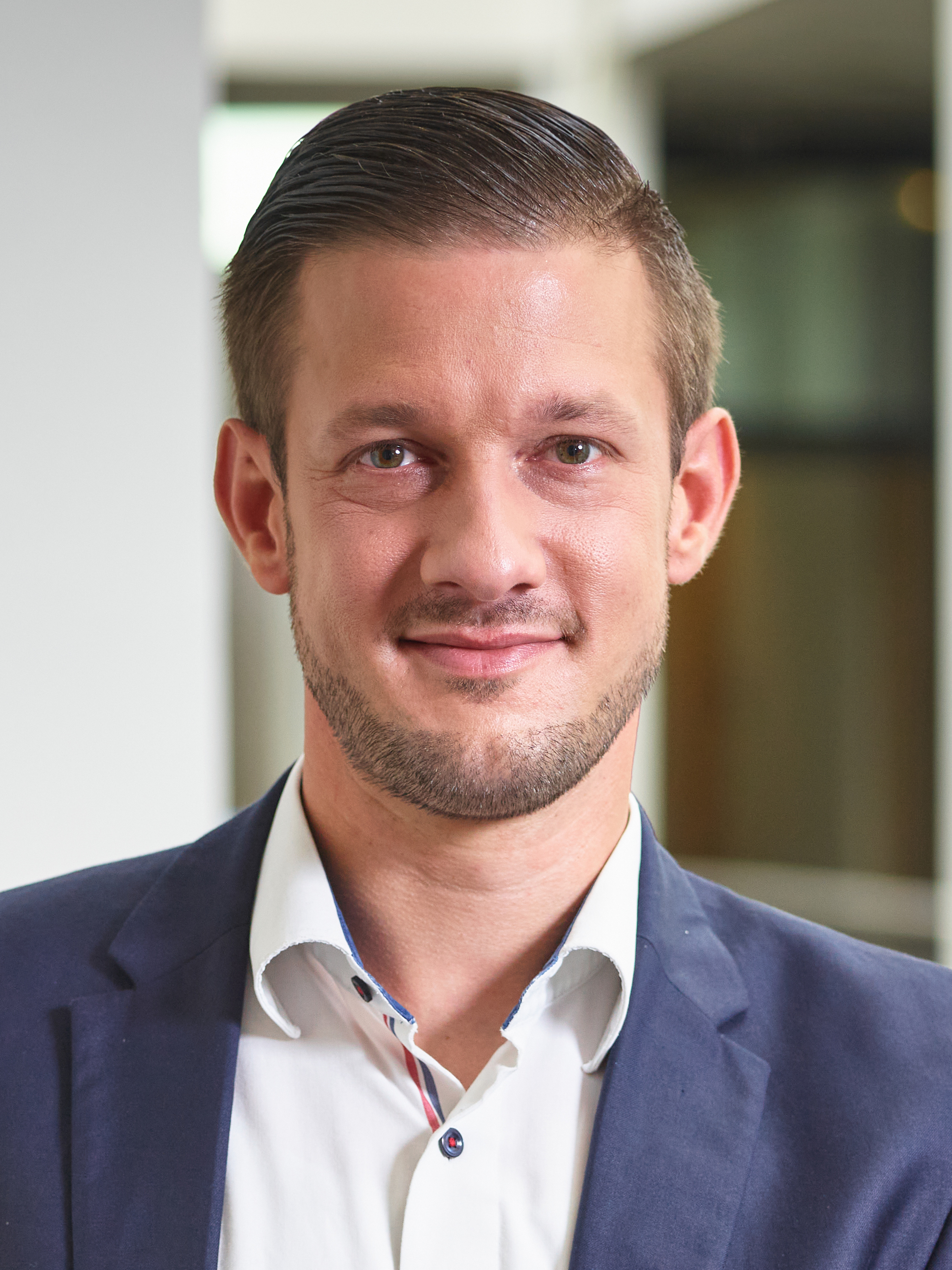
- Wink in 2021

Member of the Landtag of Rhineland-Palatinate
- Incumbent
- Assumed office 18 May 2016

Personal details
- Born: 9 May 1984 (age 42) Ottweiler
- Party: Free Democratic Party (since 2008)

Steven Wink (born 9 May 1984 in Ottweiler) is a German politician serving as a member of the Landtag of Rhineland-Palatinate since 2016. He has served as group leader of the Free Democratic Party since 2025.
