= Oliver Kumbartzky =

German politician (born 1981)

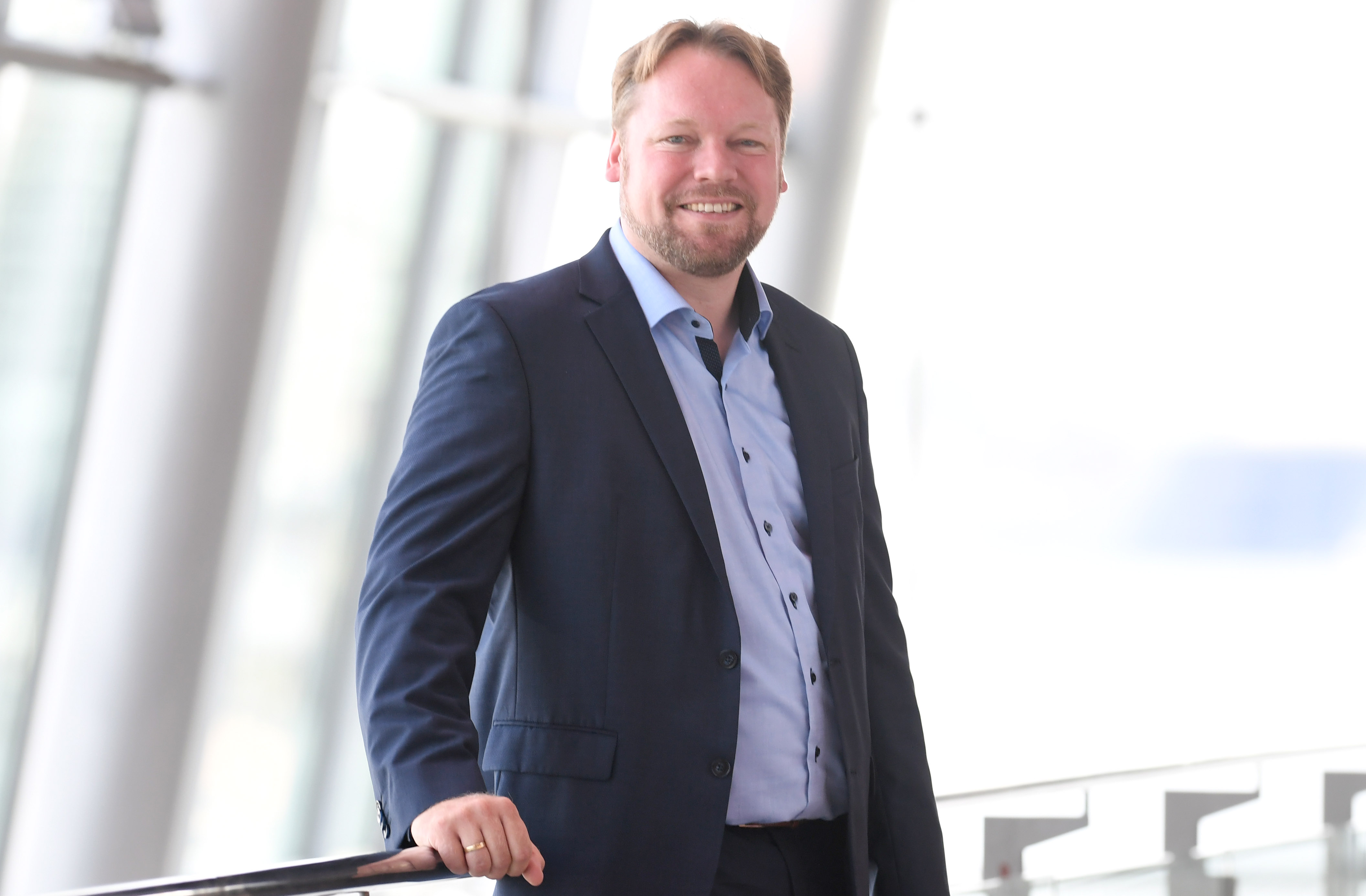
- Kumbartzky in 2020

Member of the Landtag of Schleswig-Holstein
- In office 27 October 2009 – 12 December 2024
- Succeeded by: Anne Riecke

Personal details
- Born: 19 September 1981 (age 44) Brunsbüttel
- Party: Free Democratic Party (since 2002)

Oliver Kumbartzky (born 19 September 1981 in Brunsbüttel) is a German politician serving as mayor of Büsum since 2025. From 2009 to 2024, he was a member of the Landtag of Schleswig-Holstein. From 2022 to 2024, he served as chairman of the Free Democratic Party in Schleswig-Holstein.
