= Klaus Rickert =

German politician (born 1946)

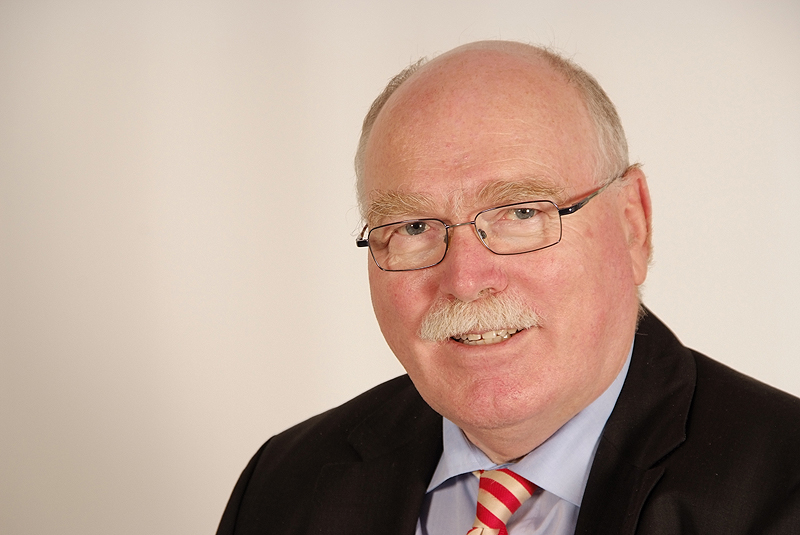
- Klaus Rickert Nov. 2009
- Born: 22 July 1946 (age 79)
- Occupation: German politician

Klaus Rickert (born 22 July 1946 in Bekmünde) is a German politician for the Free Democratic Party (FDP). He was elected to the Lower Saxon Landtag in 2003, and has been re-elected on one occasion.

A former university lecturer, Rickert was the chairman of the Oldenburg FDP from 1990 to 1994 and from 2000 to 2004.
