= Gisela Babel =

German politician (born 1938)

Member of the Bundestag
- In office 20 December 1990 – 26 October 1998

Personal details
- Born: 23 May 1938 (age 88) Berlin
- Party: FDP

Gisela Babel (born 23 May 1938) is a German former politician of the Free Democratic Party (FDP) and former member of the German Bundestag.

== Life ==
From 1987 until her resignation on 17 December 1990, Gisela Babel was a member of the Hessian State Parliament and was the social policy spokesperson for the FDP State Parliamentary Group.

From 1990 to 1998 she was a member of the German Bundestag.

== Literature ==
Herbst, Ludolf; Jahn, Bruno (2002). Vierhaus, Rudolf (ed.). Biographisches Handbuch der Mitglieder des Deutschen Bundestages. 1949–2002 [Biographical Handbook of the Members of the German Bundestag. 1949–2002] (in German). München: De Gruyter - De Gruyter Saur. p. 1715. ISBN 978-3-11-184511-1.
