= Opinion polling and seat projections for the 2029 European Parliament election =

This article lists European Union-wide seat projections and popular vote estimates as well as national polls for the 2029 European Parliament election.

== Seat projections ==
This table lists the seat projections for the political groups of the European Parliament. The projections can be based on an aggregation of national european election polls, national election polls and election results from all member states. 361 seats are needed for a parliamentary majority.

Organisation	Release date	Ref.	The Left	S&D	G/EFA	Renew	EPP	ECR	PfE	ESN	NI	Others (Note: Seats for national parties that are not represented in the European Parliament and do not belong to any European party.)	Lead
Europe Elects	Oct 2026		65	120	40	60	173	84	98	46	26	8	53
Europe Elects	Sep 2026		65	118	39	67	171	82	97	47	27	7	53
Der Föderalist	20 Aug 2026		51	118	40	68	175	77	99	45	19	28	57
Europe Elects	Aug 2026		64	116	40	67	172	82	97	46	27	9	56
Europe Elects	Jul 2026		65	118	39	68	173	81	96	44	28	8	55
Der Föderalist	18 Jun 2026		49	122	40	71	181	74	98	39	19	27	59
Europe Elects	Jun 2026		61	121	38	70	174	80	96	44	27	9	53
Europe Elects	May 2026		59	125	39	67	176	82	100	39	21	12	51
Der Föderalist	23 Apr 2026		52	124	39	70	173	78	103	36	21	24	49
Europe Elects	Apr 2026		57	125	39	68	177	81	100	40	21	12	52
Europe Elects	Mar 2026		55	127	38	67	176	84	106	37	22	8	49
Europe Elects	27 Feb 2026		57	127	40	69	173	83	100	40	23	8	46
Der Föderalist	26 Feb 2026		54	124	37	64	175	83	104	37	24	18	51
Europe Elects	30 Jan 2026		56	126	39	70	174	86	101	43	23	2	48
Der Föderalist	12 Jan 2026		53	122	37	71	177	80	104	38	27	11	55
Europe Elects	Dec 2025		57	126	39	72	175	84	99	42	24	2	49
Der Föderalist	13 Nov 2025		51	124	37	71	175	81	105	39	24	13	51
Europe Elects	Nov 2025		57	128	36	72	177	84	101	43	19	3	49
Europe Elects	Oct 2025		58	129	37	67	178	85	103	42	19	2	49
Europe Elects	27 Sep 2025		60	126	37	74	179	86	100	38	18	2	53
Der Föderalist	1 Sep 2025		55	123	40	66	176	85	105	37	21	12	53
Europe Elects	31 Aug 2025		60	125	38	76	180	83	98	37	21	2	55
Europe Elects	25 Jul 2025		60	127	36	77	180	83	98	36	21	2	53
Der Föderalist	1 Jul 2025		51	124	44	73	181	80	99	36	20	12	57
Europe Elects	25 Jun 2025		58	130	36	78	183	81	96	35	21	2	53
Europe Elects	31 May 2025		58	132	34	82	182	77	96	35	23	1	50
Der Föderalist	22 May 2025		49	130	40	76	179	79	100	35	23	9	49
Europe Elects	25 Apr 2025		58	130	33	79	176	79	102	37	24	2	46
Europe Elects	29 Mar 2025		55	129	33	85	175	78	103	33	25	4	46
Der Föderalist	27 Mar 2025		52	131	41	73	177	79	99	33	24	11	46
Europe Elects	28 Feb 2025		54	131	34	85	174	79	104	31	24	4	43
Der Föderalist	30 Jan 2025		48	130	43	81	185	77	93	29	24	10	55
Europe Elects	25 Jan 2025		49	131	36	85	177	81	104	29	22	6	46
Europe Elects	24 Dec 2024		49	131	37	84	179	76	104	29	25	6	48
Der Föderalist	2 Dec 2024		43	131	41	83	186	73	100	27	24	12	55
Europe Elects	30 Nov 2024		53	134	36	81	183	77	100	29	24	3	49
Europe Elects	31 Oct 2024		52	137	34	82	183	76	98	28	28	2	46
Der Föderalist	7 Oct 2024		44	136	41	79	186	74	96	26	29	9	50
Europe Elects	30 Sep 2024		46	141	40	73	185	82	93	27	31	2	44
Europe Elects	31 Aug 2024		45	140	44	72	186	80	92	26	32	3	46
Der Föderalist	12 Aug 2024		44	137	45	77	191	73	88	25	31	9	54
2024 European Parliament election	6–9 June 2024		46	136	53	77	188	78	84	25	33	–	52

== Popular vote projections ==
=== Graphical Summary ===
Opinion polling graph of table below

This table lists the vote share projection for the political groups of the European Parliament. The projections can be based on an aggregation of national European election polls, national election polls, and election results from all member states.

Organisation	Release date	Ref.	The Left	S&D	G/EFA	Renew	EPP	ECR	PfE	ESN	NI	Others (Note: Vote share for national parties that are not represented in the European Parliament and do not belong to any European party.)	Lead
Europe Elects	Aug 2026		10.7%	15.9%	6.8%	9.0%	21.1%	10.4%	11.0%	8.5%	3.4%	3.1%	5.2%
Europe Elects	Jul 2026		10.4%	16.0%	6.9%	9.0%	21.1%	10.3%	10.9%	8.2%	3.5%	3.9%	5.1%
Europe Elects	Jun 2026		10.3%	16.2%	6.6%	9.3%	21.4%	10.4%	11.0%	8.2%	3.4%	3.2%	5.2%
Europe Elects	May 2026		9.7%	16.6%	7.0%	8.9%	21.5%	10.5%	11.2%	7.2%	3.8%	3.5%	4.9%
Europe Elects	Apr 2026		9.8%	16.9%	6.9%	8.8%	21.7%	10.7%	11.3%	7.0%	3.8%	3.1%	4.8%
Europe Elects	29 Mar 2026		9.5%	17.1%	6.8%	8.5%	22.0%	10.9%	11.7%	6.6%	3.9%	3.0%	4.9%
Europe Elects	27 Feb 2026		9.9%	17.3%	6.6%	8.9%	21.5%	10.9%	11.3%	6.8%	3.9%	2.9%	4.2%
Europe Elects	30 Jan 2026		10.0%	17.1%	6.7%	9.0%	21.6%	11.1%	11.5%	7.1%	3.3%	2.6%	4.5%
Europe Elects	Dec 2025		10.0%	17.1%	6.7%	9.0%	21.6%	11.2%	11.5%	7.0%	3.6%	2.4%	4.5%
Europe Elects	Nov 2025		10.3%	17.1%	6.3%	9.3%	22.0%	11.3%	11.7%	7.1%	3.1%	1.9%	4.9%
Europe Elects	Oct 2025		10.4%	17.4%	6.4%	8.7%	21.9%	11.4%	11.8%	7.1%	3.1%	1.7%	4.5%
Europe Elects	Sep 2025		10.6%	16.9%	6.4%	9.6%	21.9%	11.5%	11.4%	6.9%	3.1%	1.6%	5.0%
Europe Elects	Aug 2025		10.3%	16.7%	6.6%	10.0%	22.2%	11.2%	11.1%	6.7%	2.9%	2.2%	5.3%
Europe Elects	Jul 2025		10.5%	16.8%	6.7%	9.9%	22.4%	11.1%	11.0%	6.6%	3.2%	1.9%	5.6%
Europe Elects	25 Jun 2025		10.4%	17.2%	6.6%	9.9%	22.4%	11.0%	10.8%	6.4%	3.4%	1.8%	5.2%
Europe Elects	25 Apr 2025		10.3%	17.3%	6.3%	10.3%	21.5%	10.6%	11.2%	6.8%	3.7%	2.0%	4.2%
Europe Elects	29 Mar 2025		9.7%	17.3%	6.2%	10.7%	21.7%	10.7%	11.4%	6.3%	3.6%	2.5%	4.4%
Europe Elects	28 Feb 2025		9.3%	17.7%	6.2%	10.8%	21.9%	10.8%	11.4%	5.8%	3.3%	2.8%	4.2%
Europe Elects	25 Jan 2025		8.3%	17.6%	6.7%	10.8%	22.7%	10.9%	11.5%	5.5%	3.2%	2.8%	5.1%
Europe Elects	24 Dec 2024		8.1%	17.6%	6.9%	10.6%	23.0%	10.3%	11.5%	5.3%	3.4%	3.3%	5.4%
Europe Elects	30 Nov 2024		8.7%	18.1%	6.5%	10.2%	23.7%	10.4%	11.1%	5.2%	3.6%	2.5%	5.6%
Europe Elects	31 Oct 2024		8.5%	18.3%	6.4%	10.5%	23.4%	10.2%	10.7%	5.1%	4.0%	2.9%	5.1%
Europe Elects	30 Sep 2024		8.1%	18.9%	7.1%	9.4%	23.6%	9.3%	9.9%	5.2%	4.4%	3.5%	4.7%
Europe Elects	31 Aug 2024		6.7%	17.7%	6.0%	8.4%	22.8%	9.3%	9.1%	5.1%	3.9%	7.8%	5.1%
2024 European Parliament election (Note: Totals do not add p to 100% as some parties and alliances from different groups ran together)	6–9 June 2024		6.77%	15.63%	6.59%	9.15%	19.65%	8.93%	10.54% (Note: As Identity and Democracy group in the 2024 election.)	4.94%	Not reported	8.64% (Note: Includes Non Inscrits.)	4.02%
