= Ole Humpich =

German politician (born 1995)

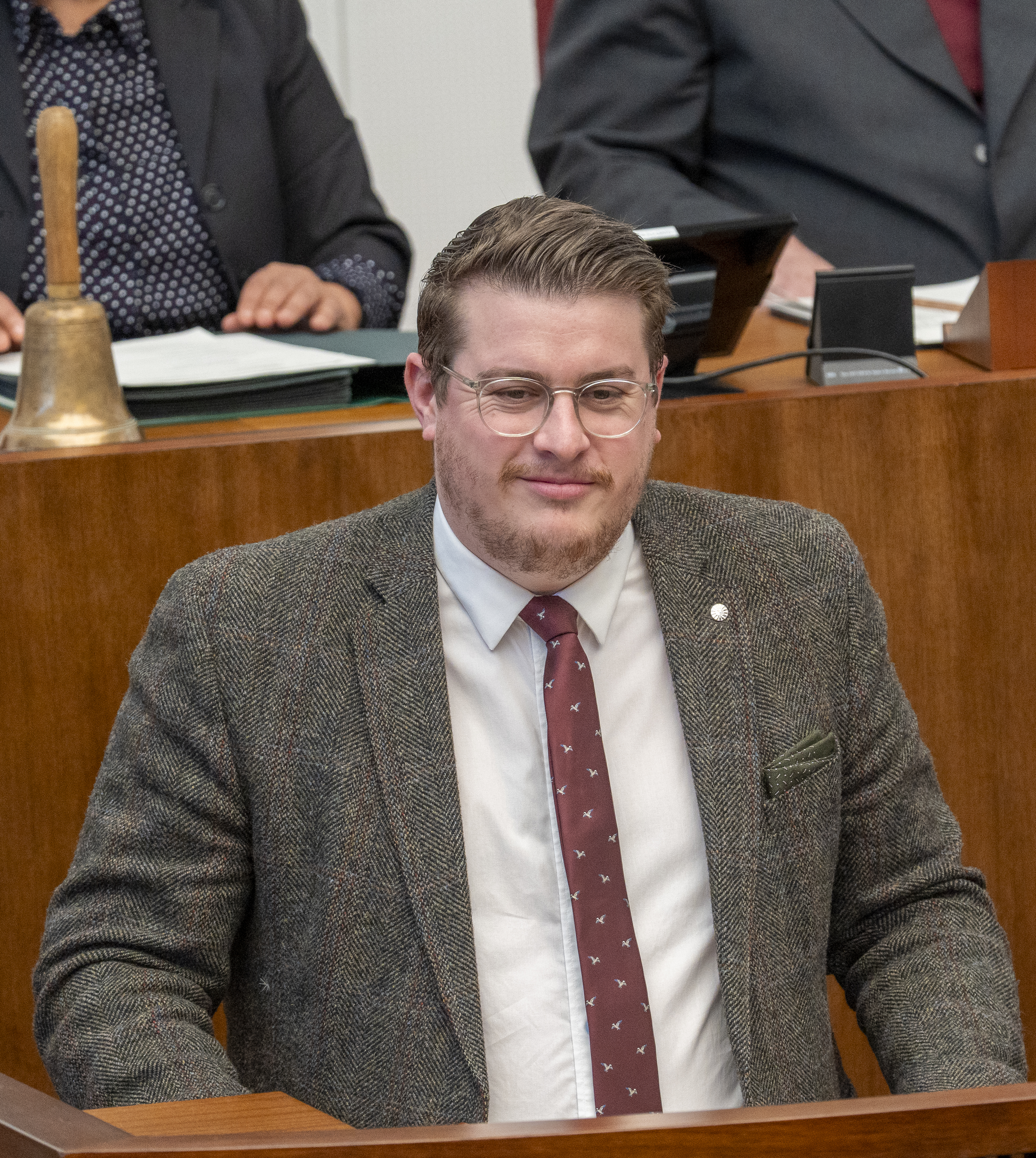
- Humpich in 2025

Member of the Bürgerschaft of Bremen
- Incumbent
- Assumed office 29 June 2023

Personal details
- Born: 9 September 1995 (age 30) Lüneburg
- Party: Free Democratic Party

Ole Humpich (born 9 September 1995 in Lüneburg) is a German politician serving as a member of the Bürgerschaft of Bremen since 2023. He has served as deputy group leader of the Free Democratic Party since 2024.
