= Florian Bernschneider =

German politician (born 1986)

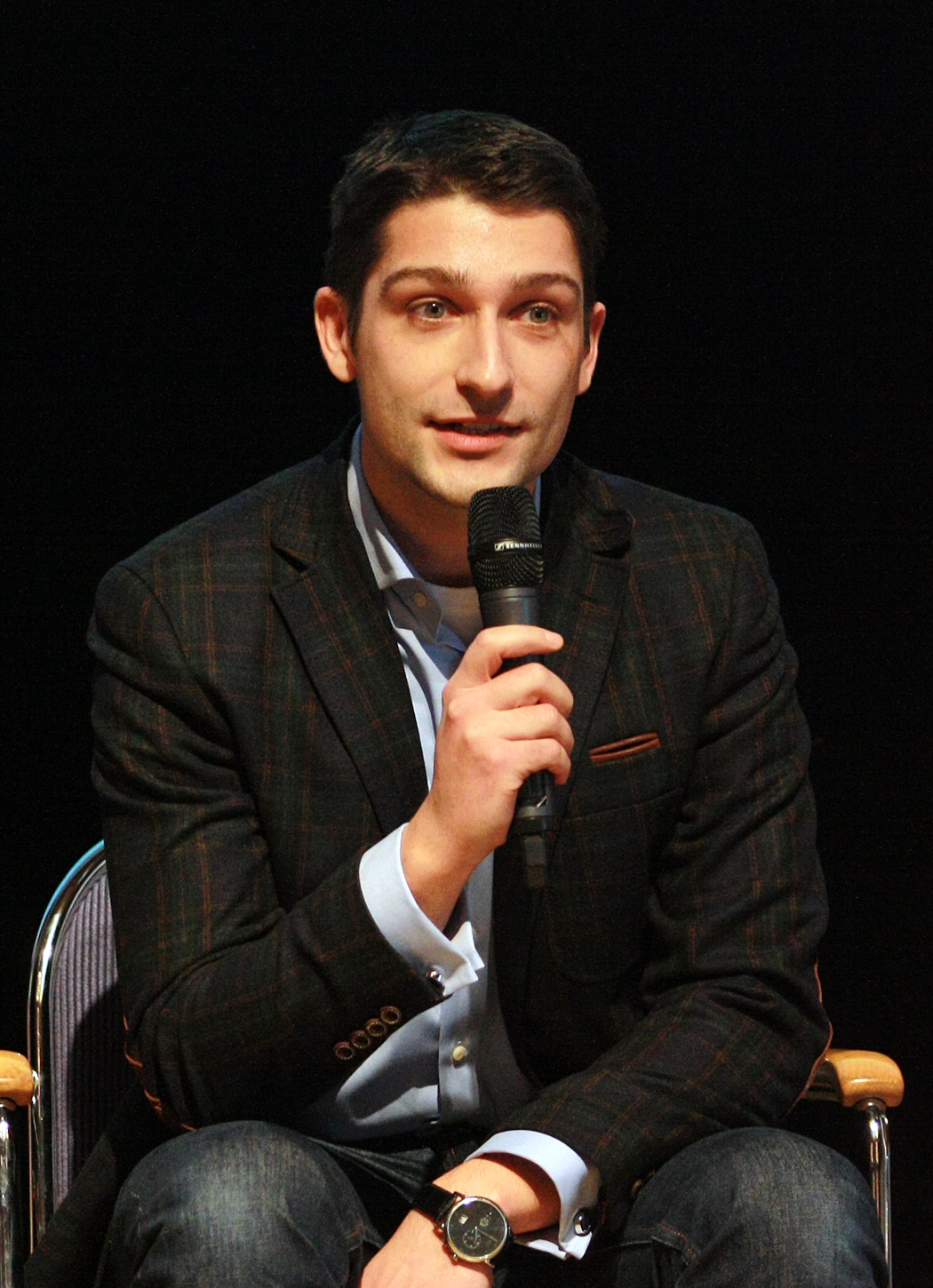
- Bernschneider in 2012

Member of the Bundestag
- In office 27 October 2009 – 22 October 2013
- Constituency: Lower Saxony

Personal details
- Born: 15 December 1986 (age 39) Braunschweig
- Party: Free Democratic Party (since 2002)

Florian Bernschneider (born 15 December 1986) is a German politician. From 2009 to 2013, he was a member of the Bundestag. He was the youngest member elected in the 2009 federal election.
