= Fritz Czermak =

German politician

Member of the Bundestag
- In office 6 October 1953 – 6 October 1957

Personal details
- Born: 24 March 1894 Prijedor
- Died: 9 April 1966 (aged 72) Vienna
- Party: FDP

Fritz Czermak (24 March 1894 – 8 April 1966) was a German politician of the Free Democratic Party (FDP) and former member of the German Bundestag.

== Life ==
Czermak was a member of the state parliament in Hesse from 1950 to 1954 and was the parliamentary group chairman of the GB/BHE there until 7 November 1953. He was a member of the German Bundestag from 1953 to 1957.

From 1958 until 1961, Czermak was under investigation after a resident of Olomuc, a concentration camp survivor, claimed that he had been denounced by Czermak to the local Gestapo office in 1940. However, the prosecution discontinued the investigation against Czermak. In his discontinuation decision, Fritz Bauer argued that even if Czermak had sent a letter to the Gestapo, it could not be established with sufficient certainty that it was this letter that led to the arrest.

== Literature ==
Herbst, Ludolf; Jahn, Bruno (2002). Vierhaus, Rudolf (ed.). Biographisches Handbuch der Mitglieder des Deutschen Bundestages. 1949–2002 [Biographical Handbook of the Members of the German Bundestag. 1949–2002] (in German). München: De Gruyter - De Gruyter Saur. p. 1715. ISBN 978-3-11-184511-1.
