= Rose Pauly (politician) =

German politician (born 1938)

Rose Felicitas Pauly (born 8 June 1938) is a German politician. A member of the Free Democratic Party, she served as a member of the Hamburg Parliament from 1987 to 1993 and again from 2001 to 2004.
