= List of members of the 2nd Bundestag =

2nd Bundestag
←	1st	3rd	→

Overview
- Legislative body: Bundestag
- Jurisdiction: Germany
- Meeting place: Bundeshaus, Bonn
- Term: 6 October 1953 – 6 October 1957
- Election: 6 September 1953
- Government: Second Adenauer cabinet
- Members: 509
- President: Hermann Ehlers (CDU/CSU; Eugen Gerstenmaier (CDU/CSU)

This is a list of members of the 2nd Bundestag – the lower house of parliament of the Federal Republic of Germany, whose members were in office from 1953 until 1957.

== Members ==
State	No.	Constituency	Member	Party
Schleswig-Holstein	1	Husum – Südtondern – Eiderstedt	Christian Giencke	CDU
Schleswig-Holstein	2	Flensburg	Will Rasner	CDU
Schleswig-Holstein	3	Schleswig – Eckernförde	Kai-Uwe von Hassel (Note: Kai-Uwe von Hassel resigned on 4 November 1954.)	CDU
Schleswig-Holstein	4	Norder- und Süderdithmarschen	Hermann Glüsing	CDU
Schleswig-Holstein	5	Rendsburg	Detlef Struve	CDU
Schleswig-Holstein	6	Kiel	Walter Brookmann (Note: Walter Brookmann died on 31 August 1957.)	CDU
Schleswig-Holstein	7	Plön – Eutin/Nord	Heinrich Gerns	CDU
Schleswig-Holstein	8	Oldenburg – Eutin/Süd	Karl Diedrichsen	CDU
Schleswig-Holstein	9	Lübeck	Paul Bock	CDU
Schleswig-Holstein	10	Segeberg – Neumünster	Walter Bartram	CDU
Schleswig-Holstein	11	Steinburg	Ernst Engelbrecht-Greve	CDU
Schleswig-Holstein	12	Pinneberg	Wilhelm Goldhagen	CDU
Schleswig-Holstein	13	Stormarn	Werner Schwarz	CDU
Schleswig-Holstein	14	Herzogtum Lauenburg	Otto Christian Archibald von Bismarck	CDU
Schleswig-Holstein	List		Fritz Baade	SPD
Schleswig-Holstein	List		Bruno Diekmann	SPD
Schleswig-Holstein	List		Wilhelm Gülich	SPD
Schleswig-Holstein	List		Kurt Pohle	SPD
Schleswig-Holstein	List		Karl Regling	SPD
Schleswig-Holstein	List		Reinhold Rehs	SPD
Schleswig-Holstein	List		Annemarie Renger	SPD
Schleswig-Holstein	List		Eva Gräfin Finck von Finckenstein	GB/BHE
Schleswig-Holstein	List		Alfred Gille	GB/BHE
Schleswig-Holstein	List		Waldemar Kraft	GB/BHE
Schleswig-Holstein	List		Wilhelm Jentzsch	FDP
Schleswig-Holstein	List		Otto Wittenburg	DP
Schleswig-Holstein	List		Hans Blöcker (Note: Hans Blöcker took office on 8 November 1954, to succeed Kai-Uwe von Hassel.)	CDU
Hamburg	15	Hamburg I	Gerd Bucerius	CDU
Hamburg	16	Hamburg II	Hugo Scharnberg	CDU
Hamburg	17	Hamburg III	Fritz Becker	DP
Hamburg	18	Hamburg IV	Hermann Schäfer	FDP
Hamburg	19	Hamburg V	Albert Walter	DP
Hamburg	20	Hamburg VI	Hans Griem (Note: Hans Griem died on 7 November 1955.)	CDU
Hamburg	21	Hamburg VII	Herbert Wehner	SPD
Hamburg	22	Hamburg VIII	Willy Max Rademacher	FDP
Hamburg	List		Peter Blachstein	SPD
Hamburg	List		Hellmut Kalbitzer	SPD
Hamburg	List		Irma Keilhack	SPD
Hamburg	List		Gertrud Lockmann	SPD
Hamburg	List		Karl Meitmann	SPD
Hamburg	List		Helmut Schmidt	SPD
Hamburg	List		Paul Leverkuehn	CDU
Hamburg	List		Karlfranz Schmidt-Wittmack (Note: Karlfranz Schmidt-Wittmack was removed on 23 February 1956.)	CDU
Hamburg	List		Georg Schneider	CDU
Hamburg	List		Roland Seffrin	CDU
Hamburg	List		Elisabeth Ganswindt (Note: Elisabeth Ganswindt took office on 9 November 1955, to succeed Hans Griem.)	CDU
Hamburg	List		Ernst Albrecht (Note: Ernst Albrecht took office on 11 May 1956, to succeed Karlfranz Schmidt-Wittmack.)	CDU
Lower Saxony	23	Aurich – Emden	Georg Peters	SPD
Lower Saxony	24	Leer	Hermann Conring	CDU
Lower Saxony	25	Wilhelmshaven – Friesland	Hellmuth Heye	CDU
Lower Saxony	26	Emsland	Heinrich Barlage	CDU
Lower Saxony	27	Bersenbrück – Lingen	Walter Drechsel	CDU
Lower Saxony	28	Osnabrück-Stadt und -Land	Anton Storch	CDU
Lower Saxony	29	Delmenhorst – Wesermarsch	Hermann Ehlers (Note: Hermann Ehlers died on 29 October 1954.)	CDU
Lower Saxony	30	Oldenburg – Ammerland	Robert Dannemann (Note: Robert Dannemann resigned on 1 July 1955.)	FDP
Lower Saxony	31	Vechta – Cloppenburg	Kurt Schmücker	CDU
Lower Saxony	32	Cuxhaven – Hadeln – Wesermünde	Karl Müller	DP
Lower Saxony	33	Stade – Bremervörde	Heinrich Hellwege (Note: Heinrich Hellwege resigned on 27 May 1955.)	DP
Lower Saxony	34	Verden – Rotenburg – Osterholz	Hans-Joachim von Merkatz	DP
Lower Saxony	35	Lüneburg – Dannenberg	Willi Koops	CDU
Lower Saxony	36	Harburg – Soltau	Hans-Christoph Seebohm	DP
Lower Saxony	37	Fallingbostel – Hoya	Heinz Matthes	DP
Lower Saxony	38	Celle	Lisa Korspeter	SPD
Lower Saxony	39	Uelzen	Heinrich Zimmermann	DP
Lower Saxony	40	Stadt Hannover-Nord	Egon Franke	SPD
Lower Saxony	41	Stadt Hannover-Süd	Erich Ollenhauer	SPD
Lower Saxony	42	Hannover-Land	Hans Jahn	SPD
Lower Saxony	43	Neustadt – Grafschaft Schaumburg	Ernst Weltner	SPD
Lower Saxony	44	Nienburg – Schaumburg-Lippe	Otto Heinrich Greve	SPD
Lower Saxony	45	Diepholz – Melle – Wittlage	Rudolf Eickhoff	DP
Lower Saxony	46	Hameln – Springe	Alexander Elbrächter	DP
Lower Saxony	47	Alfeld – Holzminden	Elinor Hubert	SPD
Lower Saxony	48	Hildesheim-Stadt und -Land	Adolf Cillien	CDU
Lower Saxony	49	Gandersheim – Salzgitter	Wilhelm Höck	CDU
Lower Saxony	50	Stadt Braunschweig	Otto Arnholz	SPD
Lower Saxony	51	Braunschweig-Land – Helmstedt	Alfred Burgemeister	CDU
Lower Saxony	52	Wolfenbüttel – Goslar-Land	Rudolf Schrader	CDU
Lower Saxony	53	Harz	Heinrich Lindenberg	CDU
Lower Saxony	54	Peine – Gifhorn	Joachim Schöne	SPD
Lower Saxony	55	Northeim – Einbeck – Duderstadt	Martin Schmidt	SPD
Lower Saxony	56	Göttingen-Münden	Walter Drechsel	FDP
Lower Saxony	List		Wilhelm Brese	CDU
Lower Saxony	List		Else Brökelschen	CDU
Lower Saxony	List		Karl von Buchka	CDU
Lower Saxony	List		Hermann Friese	CDU
Lower Saxony	List		Johannes Kortmann	CDU
Lower Saxony	List		Ernst Kuntscher	CDU
Lower Saxony	List		Fritz Mensing	CDU
Lower Saxony	List		Siegfried Moerchel	CDU
Lower Saxony	List		Wilhelm Naegel (Note: Wilhelm Naegel died on 24 May 1956.)	CDU
Lower Saxony	List		J. Hermann Siemer	CDU
Lower Saxony	List		Franz Varelmann	CDU
Lower Saxony	List		Elisabeth Vietje	CDU
Lower Saxony	List		Wilhelm Lotze (Note: Wilhelm Lotze took office on 1 November 1954, to succeed Hermann Ehlers.)	CDU
Lower Saxony	List		Johann Thies (Note: Johann Thies took office on 30 May 1956, to succeed Wilhelm Naegel.)	CDU
Lower Saxony	List		Franziska Bennemann	SPD
Lower Saxony	List		Heinz Frehsee	SPD
Lower Saxony	List		Hans Hermsdorf	SPD
Lower Saxony	List		Herbert Kriedemann	SPD
Lower Saxony	List		Fritz Ohlig	SPD
Lower Saxony	List		Moritz-Ernst Priebe	SPD
Lower Saxony	List		Heinrich-Wilhelm Ruhnke	SPD
Lower Saxony	List		Fritz Wenzel	SPD
Lower Saxony	List		Ernst Winter (Note: Ernst Winter died on 7 March 1954.)	SPD
Lower Saxony	List		Otto Ziegler (Note: Otto Ziegler died on 27 July 1956.)	SPD
Lower Saxony	List		Ferdinand Stümer (Note: Ferdinand Stümer took office on 30 March 1954, to succeed Ernst Winter.)	SPD
Lower Saxony	List		Erich Leitow (Note: Erich Leitow took office on 3 August 1956, to succeed Otto Ziegler.)	SPD
Lower Saxony	List		Martin Elsner	GB/BHE
Lower Saxony	List		Hans Egon Engell	GB/BHE
Lower Saxony	List		Erni Finselberger	GB/BHE
Lower Saxony	List		Horst Haasler	GB/BHE
Lower Saxony	List		Walter Kutschera	GB/BHE
Lower Saxony	List		Rudolf Meyer-Ronnenberg	GB/BHE
Lower Saxony	List		Ernst Srock	GB/BHE
Lower Saxony	List		Herwart Miessner	FDP
Lower Saxony	List		Alfred Onnen	FDP
Lower Saxony	List		Artur Stegner	FDP
Lower Saxony	List		Carlo Graaff (Note: Carlo Graaff took office on 4 July 1955, to succeed Robert Dannemann.)	FDP
Lower Saxony	List		Margot Kalinke (Note: Margot Kalinke took office on 3 June 1955, to succeed Heinrich Hellwege.)	DP
Bremen	57	Bremen-Ost	Hermann Hansing	SPD
Bremen	58	Bremen-West	Siegfried Bärsch	SPD
Bremen	59	Bremerhaven – Bremen-Nord	Philipp Wehr	SPD
Bremen	List		Karl Krammig	CDU
Bremen	List		Ernst Müller-Hermann	CDU
Bremen	List		Herbert Schneider	DP
North Rhine-Westphalia	60	Aachen-Stadt	Helene Weber	CDU
North Rhine-Westphalia	61	Aachen-Land	Franz Mühlenberg	CDU
North Rhine-Westphalia	62	Geilenkirchen – Erkelenz – Jülich	Karl Müller	CDU
North Rhine-Westphalia	63	Düren – Monschau – Schleiden	Bernhard Günther	CDU
North Rhine-Westphalia	64	Bergheim (Erft) – Euskirchen	Johannes Even	CDU
North Rhine-Westphalia	65	Köln-Land	Aloys Lenz	CDU
North Rhine-Westphalia	66	Cologne I	Aenne Brauksiepe	CDU
North Rhine-Westphalia	67	Cologne II	Hermann Pünder	CDU
North Rhine-Westphalia	68	Cologne III	Johannes Albers	CDU
North Rhine-Westphalia	69	Bonn-Stadt und -Land	Konrad Adenauer	CDU
North Rhine-Westphalia	70	Siegkreis	Peter Etzenbach	CDU
North Rhine-Westphalia	71	Oberbergischer Kreis	August Dresbach	CDU
North Rhine-Westphalia	72	Rheinisch-Bergischer Kreis	Paul Lücke	CDU
North Rhine-Westphalia	73	Rhein-Wupper-Kreis	Peter Wilhelm Brand	CDU
North Rhine-Westphalia	74	Remscheid – Solingen	Fritz Hellwig	CDU
North Rhine-Westphalia	75	Wuppertal I	Carl Wirths (Note: Carl Wirths died on 16 June 1955.)	FDP
North Rhine-Westphalia	76	Wuppertal II	Eugen Huth	CDU
North Rhine-Westphalia	77	Düsseldorf-Mettmann	Gerhard Schröder	CDU
North Rhine-Westphalia	78	Düsseldorf I	Josef Gockeln	CDU
North Rhine-Westphalia	79	Düsseldorf II	Johannes Caspers	CDU
North Rhine-Westphalia	80	Neuss – Grevenbroich	Richard Muckermann	CDU
North Rhine-Westphalia	81	Krefeld	Günther Serres	CDU
North Rhine-Westphalia	82	Rheydt – M. Gladbach – Viersen	Joseph Illerhaus	CDU
North Rhine-Westphalia	83	Kempen-Krefeld	Matthias Hoogen	CDU
North Rhine-Westphalia	84	Moers	Ernst Holla	CDU
North Rhine-Westphalia	85	Geldern – Kleve	Emil Solke	CDU
North Rhine-Westphalia	86	Rees – Dinslaken	Heinrich Lübke	CDU
North Rhine-Westphalia	87	Oberhausen	Johannes Brockmann	Centre
North Rhine-Westphalia	88	Mülheim	Gisela Praetorius	CDU
North Rhine-Westphalia	89	Essen I	Walter Kühlthau	CDU
North Rhine-Westphalia	90	Essen II	Karl Bergmann	SPD
North Rhine-Westphalia	91	Essen III	Jakob Kaiser	CDU
North Rhine-Westphalia	92	Duisburg I	Leo Storm	CDU
North Rhine-Westphalia	93	Duisburg II	Fritz Berendsen	CDU
North Rhine-Westphalia	94	Borken – Bocholt – Ahaus	Theodor Blank	CDU
North Rhine-Westphalia	95	Steinfurt – Tecklenburg	Georg Pelster	CDU
North Rhine-Westphalia	96	Beckum – Warendorf	Bernhard Raestrup	CDU
North Rhine-Westphalia	97	Münster-Stadt und -Land	Peter Nellen	CDU
North Rhine-Westphalia	98	Lüdinghausen – Coesfeld	Hubert Schulze-Pellengahr	CDU
North Rhine-Westphalia	99	Gelsenkirchen	Robert Geritzmann	SPD
North Rhine-Westphalia	100	Recklinghausen-Land	Friedrich Wilhelm Willeke	CDU
North Rhine-Westphalia	101	Recklinghausen-Stadt	Bernhard Winkelheide	CDU
North Rhine-Westphalia	102	Gladbeck – Bottrop	Johann Harnischfeger	CDU
North Rhine-Westphalia	103	Warburg – Höxter – Büren	Josef Menke	CDU
North Rhine-Westphalia	104	Paderborn – Wiedenbrück	Maria Niggemeyer	CDU
North Rhine-Westphalia	105	Bielefeld – Halle	Frieda Nadig	SPD
North Rhine-Westphalia	106	Bielefeld-Stadt	Artur Ladebeck	SPD
North Rhine-Westphalia	107	Herford-Stadt und -Land	Heinrich Höcker	SPD
North Rhine-Westphalia	108	Detmold	August Berlin	SPD
North Rhine-Westphalia	109	Lemgo	Wilhelm Mellies	SPD
North Rhine-Westphalia	110	Minden – Lübbecke	Paul Bleiß	SPD
North Rhine-Westphalia	111	Wattenscheid – Wanne-Eickel	Erich Meyer	SPD
North Rhine-Westphalia	112	Herne – Castrop-Rauxel	Friedrich Welskop	CDU
North Rhine-Westphalia	113	Ennepe-Ruhr – Witten	Heinrich Sträter	SPD
North Rhine-Westphalia	114	Hagen	Luise Rehling	CDU
North Rhine-Westphalia	115	Dortmund I	Walter Menzel	SPD
North Rhine-Westphalia	116	Dortmund II	Dietrich Keuning	SPD
North Rhine-Westphalia	117	Dortmund III – Lünen	Otto Dannebom	SPD
North Rhine-Westphalia	118	Bochum	Franzjosef Müser	CDU
North Rhine-Westphalia	119	Iserlohn-Stadt und -Land	Johannes Kunze	CDU
North Rhine-Westphalia	120	Unna – Hamm	Ernst von Bodelschwingh	CDU
North Rhine-Westphalia	121	Meschede – Olpe	Franz Lenze	CDU
North Rhine-Westphalia	122	Arnsberg – Soest	Ernst Majonica	CDU
North Rhine-Westphalia	123	Lippstadt – Brilon	Aloys Feldmann	CDU
North Rhine-Westphalia	124	Altena – Lüdenscheid	Peterheinrich Kirchhoff	CDU
North Rhine-Westphalia	125	Siegen-Stadt und -Land – Wittgenstein	Theodor Siebel	CDU
North Rhine-Westphalia	List		Luise Albertz	SPD
North Rhine-Westphalia	List		Johannes Böhm (Note: Johannes Böhm died on 18 July 1957.)	SPD
North Rhine-Westphalia	List		August Bruse	SPD
North Rhine-Westphalia	List		Robert Daum	SPD
North Rhine-Westphalia	List		Heinrich Deist	SPD
North Rhine-Westphalia	List		Fritz Eschmann	SPD
North Rhine-Westphalia	List		Wilhelm Gefeller	SPD
North Rhine-Westphalia	List		Alfred Gleisner	SPD
North Rhine-Westphalia	List		Robert Görlinger (Note: Robert Görlinger died on 10 February 1954.)	SPD
North Rhine-Westphalia	List		Werner Hansen	SPD
North Rhine-Westphalia	List		Johann Karl Heide	SPD
North Rhine-Westphalia	List		Rudolf-Ernst Heiland	SPD
North Rhine-Westphalia	List		Fritz Heinrich	SPD
North Rhine-Westphalia	List		Josef Hellenbrock	SPD
North Rhine-Westphalia	List		Josef Hufnagel	SPD
North Rhine-Westphalia	List		Werner Jacobi	SPD
North Rhine-Westphalia	List		Alma Kettig	SPD
North Rhine-Westphalia	List		Georg Richard Kinat	SPD
North Rhine-Westphalia	List		Liesel Kipp-Kaule	SPD
North Rhine-Westphalia	List		Jakob Koenen	SPD
North Rhine-Westphalia	List		Willy Könen	SPD
North Rhine-Westphalia	List		Heinz Kühn	SPD
North Rhine-Westphalia	List		Erwin Lange	SPD
North Rhine-Westphalia	List		Gerhard Lütkens (Note: Gerhard Lütkens died on 17 November 1955.)	SPD
North Rhine-Westphalia	List		Trudel Meyer	SPD
North Rhine-Westphalia	List		Matthias Moll	SPD
North Rhine-Westphalia	List		Heinz Pöhler	SPD
North Rhine-Westphalia	List		Hugo Rasch	SPD
North Rhine-Westphalia	List		Margarete Rudoll	SPD
North Rhine-Westphalia	List		Hermann Runge	SPD
North Rhine-Westphalia	List		Josef Scheuren	SPD
North Rhine-Westphalia	List		Wilhelm Tenhagen (Note: Wilhelm Tenhagen died on 22 August 1954.)	SPD
North Rhine-Westphalia	List		Erwin Welke	SPD
North Rhine-Westphalia	List		Karl Wienand	SPD
North Rhine-Westphalia	List		Paul Putzig (Note: Paul Putzig took office on 13 February 1954, to succeed Robert Görlinger.)	SPD
North Rhine-Westphalia	List		Friedhelm Missmahl (Note: Friedhelm Missmahl took office on 1 September 1954, to succeed Wilhelm Tenhagen.)	SPD
North Rhine-Westphalia	List		Wilhelm Dopatka (Note: Wilhelm Dopatka took office on 21 November 1955, to succeed Gerhard Lütkens.)	SPD
North Rhine-Westphalia	List		Luise Peter (Note: Luise Peter took office on 24 July 1957, to succeed Johannes Böhm.)	SPD
North Rhine-Westphalia	List		Bernhard Bergmeyer	CDU
North Rhine-Westphalia	List		Valentin Brück (Note: Valentin Brück resigned on 17 September 1957.)	CDU
North Rhine-Westphalia	List		Dietrich Bürkel	CDU
North Rhine-Westphalia	List		Hermann Ehren	CDU
North Rhine-Westphalia	List		Heinrich Glasmeyer	CDU
North Rhine-Westphalia	List		Karl Hahn	CDU
North Rhine-Westphalia	List		Carl Hesberg	CDU
North Rhine-Westphalia	List		Linus Kather	CDU
North Rhine-Westphalia	List		Georg Kliesing	CDU
North Rhine-Westphalia	List		Walther Kolbe (Note: Walther Kolbe died on 25 December 1953.)	CDU
North Rhine-Westphalia	List		Richard Oetzel	CDU
North Rhine-Westphalia	List		Robert Pferdmenges	CDU
North Rhine-Westphalia	List		Wolfgang Pohle	CDU
North Rhine-Westphalia	List		Wilmar Sabaß	CDU
North Rhine-Westphalia	List		Heinrich Scheppmann	CDU
North Rhine-Westphalia	List		Viktoria Steinbiß	CDU
North Rhine-Westphalia	List		Theodor Teriete	CDU
North Rhine-Westphalia	List		Heinrich Voß	CDU
North Rhine-Westphalia	List		Heinrich Wehking	CDU
North Rhine-Westphalia	List		Hugo Wiedeck	CDU
North Rhine-Westphalia	List		Heinrich Wullenhaupt	CDU
North Rhine-Westphalia	List		Emmi Welter (Note: Emmi Welter took office on 4 January 1954, to succeed Walther Kolbe.)	CDU
North Rhine-Westphalia	List		Mathilde Gantenberg (Note: Mathilde Gantenberg took office on 8 October 1956, to succeed Eduard Orth.)	CDU
North Rhine-Westphalia	List		Heinrich Windelen (Note: Heinrich Windelen took office on 28 September 1957, to succeed Valentin Brück.)	CDU
North Rhine-Westphalia	List		Martin Blank	FDP
North Rhine-Westphalia	List		Franz Blücher	FDP
North Rhine-Westphalia	List		Lotte Friese-Korn	FDP
North Rhine-Westphalia	List		Walther Kühn	FDP
North Rhine-Westphalia	List		Hubertus, Prince of Löwenstein-Wertheim-Freudenberg	FDP
North Rhine-Westphalia	List		Hasso von Manteuffel	FDP
North Rhine-Westphalia	List		Erich Mende	FDP
North Rhine-Westphalia	List		Friedrich Middelhauve (Note: Friedrich Middelhauve resigned on 10 September 1954.)	FDP
North Rhine-Westphalia	List		Walter Scheel	FDP
North Rhine-Westphalia	List		Hermann Schwann	FDP
North Rhine-Westphalia	List		Willi Weyer (Note: Willi Weyer resigned on 17 September 1954.)	FDP
North Rhine-Westphalia	List		Fritz Held (Note: Fritz Held took office on 13 September 1954, to succeed Friedrich Middelhauve.)	FDP
North Rhine-Westphalia	List		Paul Luchtenberg (Note: Paul Luchtenberg took office on 18 September 1954, to succeed Willi Weyer, but later resigned on 9 April 1956.)	FDP
North Rhine-Westphalia	List		Hermann Berg (Note: Hermann Berg took office on 27 June 1955, to succeed Carl Wirths.)	FDP
North Rhine-Westphalia	List		Hubertus von Golitschek (Note: Hubertus von Golitschek took office on 18 April 1956, to succeed Paul Luchtenberg.)	FDP
North Rhine-Westphalia	List		Heinz Gemein	GB/BHE
North Rhine-Westphalia	List		Georg Körner	GB/BHE
North Rhine-Westphalia	List		Helmut Petersen	GB/BHE
North Rhine-Westphalia	List		Franz Böhner (Note: Franz Böhner died on 8 January 1954.)	Centre
North Rhine-Westphalia	List		Martin Heix	Centre
North Rhine-Westphalia	List		Josef Rösing (Note: Josef Rösing took office on 14 January 1954, to succeed Franz Böhner.)	Centre
North Rhine-Westphalia	List		Heinrich Schild	DP
Hesse	126	Waldeck	Heinrich Fassbender	FDP
Hesse	127	Kassel	Ludwig Preller	SPD
Hesse	128	Eschwege	Rudolf Freidhof	SPD
Hesse	129	Fritzlar-Homberg	August-Martin Euler	FDP
Hesse	130	Hersfeld	Adolf Arndt	SPD
Hesse	131	Marburg	Ludwig Preiß	FDP
Hesse	132	Wetzlar	Wilhelm Reitz	SPD
Hesse	133	Gießen	Ludwig Schneider	FDP
Hesse	134	Fulda	Anton Sabel (Note: Anton Sabel resigned on 16 September 1957.)	CDU
Hesse	135	Obertaunuskreis	Erich Köhler	CDU
Hesse	136	Friedberg	Willi Richter	SPD
Hesse	137	Limburg	Josef Arndgen	CDU
Hesse	138	Wiesbaden	Victor-Emanuel Preusker	FDP
Hesse	139	Hanau	Jakob Altmaier	SPD
Hesse	140	Frankfurt/M I	Peter Horn	CDU
Hesse	141	Frankfurt/M II	Walter Leiske	CDU
Hesse	142	Frankfurt/M III	Franz Böhm	CDU
Hesse	143	Groß-Gerau	Hermann Schmitt	SPD
Hesse	144	Offenbach/M	Wilhelm Banse	SPD
Hesse	145	Darmstadt	Ludwig Metzger	SPD
Hesse	146	Dieburg	Heinrich Georg Ritzel	SPD
Hesse	147	Bergstraße	Heinrich von Brentano	CDU
Hesse	List		Wilhelm Gontrum	CDU
Hesse	List		Hermann Götz	CDU
Hesse	List		Oskar Knapp	CDU
Hesse	List		Walter Löhr	CDU
Hesse	List		Willy Massoth	CDU
Hesse	List		Elisabeth Pitz-Savelsberg	CDU
Hesse	List		Eduard Platner	CDU
Hesse	List		Elisabeth Schwarzhaupt	CDU
Hesse	List		Lucie Beyer	SPD
Hesse	List		Willi Birkelbach	SPD
Hesse	List		Wenzel Jaksch	SPD
Hesse	List		Hans Merten	SPD
Hesse	List		Georg Stierle	SPD
Hesse	List		Karl Wittrock	SPD
Hesse	List		Max Becker	FDP
Hesse	List		Karl Gaul	FDP
Hesse	List		Richard Hammer	FDP
Hesse	List		Karl Hepp	FDP
Hesse	List		Fritz Czermak	GB/BHE
Hesse	List		Lothar Kunz	GB/BHE
Hesse	List		Frank Seiboth	GB/BHE
Hesse	List		Helmuth Schranz	DP
Rhineland-Palatinate	148	Altenkirchen (Westerwald)	Franz-Josef Wuermeling	CDU
Rhineland-Palatinate	149	Ahrweiler	Otto Lenz (Note: Otto Lenz died on 2 May 1957.)	CDU
Rhineland-Palatinate	150	Koblenz	Karl Walz	CDU
Rhineland-Palatinate	151	Cochem	Paul Gibbert	CDU
Rhineland-Palatinate	152	Kreuznach	Hugo Mayer	CDU
Rhineland-Palatinate	153	Prüm	Hans Richarts	CDU
Rhineland-Palatinate	154	Trier	Heinrich Kemper	CDU
Rhineland-Palatinate	155	Westerburg	Robert Stauch	CDU
Rhineland-Palatinate	156	Mainz	Josef Schlick	CDU
Rhineland-Palatinate	157	Worms	Willy Müller	SPD
Rhineland-Palatinate	158	Ludwigshafen am Rhein	Friedrich Wilhelm Wagner	SPD
Rhineland-Palatinate	159	Neustadt an der Weinstraße	Ludwig Knobloch	CDU
Rhineland-Palatinate	160	Kaiserslautern	August Spies	CDU
Rhineland-Palatinate	161	Zweibrücken	Josef Becker	CDU
Rhineland-Palatinate	162	Speyer	Eduard Orth (Note: Eduard Orth resigned on 7 October 1956.)	CDU
Rhineland-Palatinate	List		Emil Bettgenhäuser	SPD
Rhineland-Palatinate	List		Anton Diel	SPD
Rhineland-Palatinate	List		Peter Jacobs	SPD
Rhineland-Palatinate	List		Adolf Ludwig	SPD
Rhineland-Palatinate	List		Willy Odenthal	SPD
Rhineland-Palatinate	List		Max Seither	SPD
Rhineland-Palatinate	List		Hermann Trittelvitz (Note: Hermann Trittelvitz resigned on 12 September 1956.)	SPD
Rhineland-Palatinate	List		Luise Herklotz (Note: Luise Herklotz took office on 24 September 1956, to succeed Hermann Trittelvitz.)	SPD
Rhineland-Palatinate	List		Annemarie Ackermann	CDU
Rhineland-Palatinate	List		Maria Dietz	CDU
Rhineland-Palatinate	List		Jakob Franzen	CDU
Rhineland-Palatinate	List		Johann Peter Josten	CDU
Rhineland-Palatinate	List		Karl Walz	CDU
Rhineland-Palatinate	List		Josef Brenner (Note: Josef Brenner took office on 5 May 1957, to succeed Otto Lenz.)	CDU
Rhineland-Palatinate	List		Karl Atzenroth	FDP
Rhineland-Palatinate	List		Anton Eberhard	FDP
Rhineland-Palatinate	List		Karl Lahr	FDP
Rhineland-Palatinate	List		Fritz Neumayer	FDP
Baden-Württemberg	163	Stuttgart I	Artur Jahn	CDU
Baden-Württemberg	164	Stuttgart II	Erwin Häussler	CDU
Baden-Württemberg	165	Ludwigsburg	Karl Mommer	SPD
Baden-Württemberg	166	Heilbronn	Adolf Mauk	FDP
Baden-Württemberg	167	Böblingen	Paul Bausch	CDU
Baden-Württemberg	168	Eßlingen	Thomas Ruf	CDU
Baden-Württemberg	169	Göppingen	Hermann Finckh	CDU
Baden-Württemberg	170	Ulm	Ludwig Erhard	CDU
Baden-Württemberg	171	Aalen	Rudolf Vogel	CDU
Baden-Württemberg	172	Backnang	Eugen Gerstenmaier	CDU
Baden-Württemberg	173	Crailsheim	Josef Brönner	CDU
Baden-Württemberg	174	Waiblingen	Karl Georg Pfleiderer (Note: Karl Georg Pfleiderer resigned on 20 September 1955.)	FDP
Baden-Württemberg	175	Karlsruhe-Stadt	Friedrich Werber	CDU
Baden-Württemberg	176	Mannheim-Stadt	Carlo Schmid	SPD
Baden-Württemberg	177	Heidelberg	Eduard Wahl	CDU
Baden-Württemberg	178	Karlsruhe-Land	Gottfried Leonhard	CDU
Baden-Württemberg	179	Bruchsal	August Neuburger	CDU
Baden-Württemberg	180	Mannheim-Land	Hermann Lindrath	CDU
Baden-Württemberg	181	Sinsheim	Eugen Leibfried (Note: Eugen Leibfried resigned on 21 June 1956.)	CDU
Baden-Württemberg	182	Tauberbischofsheim	Oskar Wacker	CDU
Baden-Württemberg	183	Konstanz	Josef Schüttler	CDU
Baden-Württemberg	184	Donaueschingen	Anton Hilbert	CDU
Baden-Württemberg	185	Lörrach	Lambert Schill	CDU
Baden-Württemberg	186	Freiburg	Hermann Kopf	CDU
Baden-Württemberg	187	Emmendingen	Heinrich Höfler	CDU
Baden-Württemberg	188	Offenburg	Oskar Rümmele	CDU
Baden-Württemberg	189	Rastatt	Wendelin Morgenthaler	CDU
Baden-Württemberg	190	Reutlingen	Gustav-Adolf Gedat	CDU
Baden-Württemberg	191	Calw	Fritz Schuler (Note: Fritz Schuler died on 30 July 1955.)	CDU
Baden-Württemberg	192	Rottweil	Karl Gengler	CDU
Baden-Württemberg	193	Balingen	Gebhard Müller (Note: Gebhard Müller resigned on 11 November 1953.)	CDU
Baden-Württemberg	194	Biberach	Bernhard Bauknecht	CDU
Baden-Württemberg	195	Ravensburg	Kurt Georg Kiesinger	CDU
Baden-Württemberg	List		Helmut Bazille	SPD
Baden-Württemberg	List		Fritz Corterier	SPD
Baden-Württemberg	List		Clara Döhring	SPD
Baden-Württemberg	List		Fritz Erler	SPD
Baden-Württemberg	List		Walter Faller	SPD
Baden-Württemberg	List		Friedrich Maier	SPD
Baden-Württemberg	List		Oskar Matzner	SPD
Baden-Württemberg	List		Emmy Meyer-Laule	SPD
Baden-Württemberg	List		Ernst Paul	SPD
Baden-Württemberg	List		Werner Pusch	SPD
Baden-Württemberg	List		Marta Schanzenbach	SPD
Baden-Württemberg	List		Erwin Schoettle	SPD
Baden-Württemberg	List		Wilhelm Traub (Note: Wilhelm Traub resigned on 8 September 1955.)	SPD
Baden-Württemberg	List		Hermann Veit (Note: Hermann Veit resigned on 10 December 1953.)	SPD
Baden-Württemberg	List		Hans Geiger (Note: Hans Geiger took office on 1 January 1954, to succeed Hermann Veit.)	SPD
Baden-Württemberg	List		Ludwig Ratzel (Note: Ludwig Ratzel took office on 15 September 1955, to succeed Wilhelm Traub.)	SPD
Baden-Württemberg	List		Hildegard Bleyler	CDU
Baden-Württemberg	List		Herbert Czaja	CDU
Baden-Württemberg	List		Oskar Farny (Note: Oskar Farny resigned on 11 November 1953.)	CDU
Baden-Württemberg	List		Hans Furler	CDU
Baden-Württemberg	List		Hedwig Jochmus	CDU
Baden-Württemberg	List		Ludwig Kroll	CDU
Baden-Württemberg	List		Wilhelm Adam Lulay	CDU
Baden-Württemberg	List		Eugen Maucher (Note: Eugen Maucher resigned on 16 September 1956.)	CDU
Baden-Württemberg	List		Julie Rösch	CDU
Baden-Württemberg	List		Albert Wolf (Note: Albert Wolf took office on 13 November 1953, to succeed Gebhard Müller.)	CDU
Baden-Württemberg	List		Josef Maier (Note: Josef Maier took office on 20 November 1953, to succeed Oskar Farny.)	CDU
Baden-Württemberg	List		Christian Leibing (Note: Christian Leibing took office on 8 August 1955, to succeed Fritz Schuler.)	CDU
Baden-Württemberg	List		Fritz Baier (Note: Fritz Baier took office on 26 June 1956, to succeed Eugen Leibfried.)	CDU
Baden-Württemberg	List		Pia Kaiser (Note: Pia Kaiser took office on 17 September 1956, to succeed Eugen Maucher.)	CDU
Baden-Württemberg	List		Ewald Bucher	FDP
Baden-Württemberg	List		Karl Hoffmann	FDP
Baden-Württemberg	List		Hans Lenz	FDP
Baden-Württemberg	List		Reinhold Maier (Note: Reinhold Maier resigned on 14 May 1956.)	FDP
Baden-Württemberg	List		Robert Margulies	FDP
Baden-Württemberg	List		Hanns Schloß	FDP
Baden-Württemberg	List		Willy Stahl	FDP
Baden-Württemberg	List		Margarete Hütter (Note: Margarete Hütter took office on 29 September 1955, to succeed Karl Georg Pfleiderer.)	FDP
Baden-Württemberg	List		Fritz Weber (Note: Fritz Weber took office on 15 May 1956, to succeed Reinhold Maier.)	FDP
Baden-Württemberg	List		Erwin Feller	GB/BHE
Baden-Württemberg	List		Eduard Fiedler (Note: Eduard Fiedler resigned on 13 October 1953.)	GB/BHE
Baden-Württemberg	List		Karl Mocker	GB/BHE
Baden-Württemberg	List		Adolf Franz Samwer (Note: Adolf Franz Samwer took office on 15 October 1953, to succeed Eduard Fiedler.)	GB/BHE
Baden-Württemberg	List		Ernst-Christoph Brühler	DP
Bavaria	196	Altötting	Josef Bauer	CSU
Bavaria	197	Fürstenfeldbruck	Richard Jaeger	CSU
Bavaria	198	Ingolstadt	Hans Demmelmeier	CSU
Bavaria	199	Miesbach	Franz Gleissner	CSU
Bavaria	200	Munich North	Otto Gumrum	CSU
Bavaria	201	Munich East	Angelo Kramel	CSU
Bavaria	202	Munich South	Karl Wieninger	CSU
Bavaria	203	Munich West	Benno Graf	CSU
Bavaria	204	Munich Land	Franz Seidl	CSU
Bavaria	205	Rosenheim	Ludwig Franz	CSU
Bavaria	206	Traunstein	Wolfgang Klausner	CSU
Bavaria	207	Weilheim	Franz Josef Strauss	CSU
Bavaria	208	Deggendorf	Stefan Dittrich	CSU
Bavaria	209	Landshut	Hans Schuberth	CSU
Bavaria	210	Passau	Fritz Schäffer	CSU
Bavaria	211	Pfarrkirchen	Max Freiherr Riederer von Paar	CSU
Bavaria	212	Straubing	Josef Lermer	CSU
Bavaria	213	Vilshofen	Franz Xaver Unertl	CSU
Bavaria	214	Amberg	Anton Donhauser	CSU
Bavaria	215	Burglengenfeld	Karl Kahn	CSU
Bavaria	216	Cham	Alois Niederalt	CSU
Bavaria	217	Regensburg	Hermann Höcherl	CSU
Bavaria	218	Tirschenreuth	Hugo Geiger	CSU
Bavaria	219	Bamberg	Emil Kemmer	CSU
Bavaria	220	Bayreuth	Herbert Hauffe	SPD
Bavaria	221	Coburg	Wolfgang Stammberger	FDP
Bavaria	222	Forchheim	Michael Horlacher	CSU
Bavaria	223	Hof	Heinz Starke	FDP
Bavaria	224	Kulmbach	Max Spörl	CSU
Bavaria	225	Ansbach	Friedrich Bauereisen	CSU
Bavaria	226	Erlangen	Werner Dollinger	CSU
Bavaria	227	Nuremberg	Walter Sassnick	SPD
Bavaria	228	Nuremberg-Fürth	Max Seidel	SPD
Bavaria	229	Schwabach	Georg Baron Manteuffel-Szoege	CSU
Bavaria	230	Weißenburg	Richard Stücklen	CSU
Bavaria	231	Aschaffenburg	Hugo Karpf	CSU
Bavaria	232	Bad Kissingen	Gustav Fuchs	CSU
Bavaria	233	Karlstadt	Maria Probst	CSU
Bavaria	234	Schweinfurt	Friedrich Funk	CSU
Bavaria	235	Würzburg	Karl Alfred Kihn	CSU
Bavaria	236	Augsburg-Stadt	Josef Ferdinand Kleindinst	CSU
Bavaria	237	Augsburg-Land	Josef Oesterle	CSU
Bavaria	238	Dillingen	Hans Schütz	CSU
Bavaria	239	Donauwörth	Philipp Meyer	CSU
Bavaria	240	Kaufbeuren	Josef Spies	CSU
Bavaria	241	Kempten	Karl von Spreti (Note: Karl von Spreti resigned on 5 March 1956.)	CSU
Bavaria	242	Memmingen	Hans August Lücker	CSU
Bavaria	List		Lisa Albrecht	SPD
Bavaria	List		Hans Bals	SPD
Bavaria	List		Hannsheinz Bauer	SPD
Bavaria	List		Valentin Baur	SPD
Bavaria	List		Arno Behrisch	SPD
Bavaria	List		Georg Dewald	SPD
Bavaria	List		Alfred Frenzel	SPD
Bavaria	List		Karl Herold	SPD
Bavaria	List		Franz Höhne	SPD
Bavaria	List		Fritz Wilhelm Hörauf	SPD
Bavaria	List		Georg Kahn-Ackermann	SPD
Bavaria	List		Gerhard Kreyssig	SPD
Bavaria	List		Georg Kurlbaum	SPD
Bavaria	List		Franz Marx	SPD
Bavaria	List		Hans Müller	SPD
Bavaria	List		Franz Op den Orth	SPD
Bavaria	List		Richard Reitzner	SPD
Bavaria	List		Walter Seuffert	SPD
Bavaria	List		Käte Strobel	SPD
Bavaria	List		Willy Thieme	SPD
Bavaria	List		Josef Wagner	SPD
Bavaria	List		Ernst Zühlke	SPD
Bavaria	List		Carl Prennel (Note: Carl Prennel took office on 9 November 1955, to succeed Walter Sassnick.)	SPD
Bavaria	List		Ingeborg Geisendörfer	CSU
Bavaria	List		Georg Graf Henckel von Donnersmarck	CSU
Bavaria	List		Edeltraud Kuchtner	CSU
Bavaria	List		Georg Lang	CSU
Bavaria	List		Edmund Leukert	CSU
Bavaria	List		Anton Miller	CSU
Bavaria	List		Walter Rinke	CSU
Bavaria	List		Georg Stiller	CSU
Bavaria	List		Gerhard Wacher	CSU
Bavaria	List		Franz Wittmann	CSU
Bavaria	List		Friedrich Winter (Note: Friedrich Winter took office on 6 March 1956, to succeed Karl von Spreti.)	CSU
Bavaria	List		Reinhold F. Bender	GB/BHE
Bavaria	List		Walter Eckhardt	GB/BHE
Bavaria	List		Wilfried Keller	GB/BHE
Bavaria	List		Otto Klötzer	GB/BHE
Bavaria	List		Theodor Oberländer	GB/BHE
Bavaria	List		Willy Reichstein	GB/BHE
Bavaria	List		Paul Sornik	GB/BHE
Bavaria	List		Johannes-Helmut Strosche	GB/BHE
Bavaria	List		Thomas Dehler	FDP
Bavaria	List		Konrad Frühwald	FDP
Bavaria	List		Herta Ilk	FDP
Bavaria	List		Hans Wellhausen	FDP
Saarland			Wilhelm Kratz (Note: Wilhelm Kratz took office on 4 January 1957, but later resigned on 11 April 1957.)	CDU
Saarland			Franz-Josef Röder (Note: Franz-Josef Röder took office on 4 January 1957.)	CDU
Saarland			Manfred Schäfer (Note: Manfred Schäfer took office on 4 January 1957.)	CDU
Saarland			Karl Steinhauer (Note: Karl Steinhauer took office on 12 April 1957, to succeed Wilhelm Kratz.)	CDU
Saarland			Heinrich Schneider (Note: Heinrich Schneider took office on 4 January 1957.)	DPS
Saarland			Erich Schwertner (Note: Erich Schwertner took office on 4 January 1957.)	DPS
Saarland			Fritz Wedel (Note: Fritz Wedel took office on 4 January 1957.)	DPS
Saarland			Franz Ruland (Note: Franz Ruland took office on 4 January 1957.)	CVP
Saarland			Franz Schneider (Note: Franz Schneider took office on 4 January 1957.)	CVP
Saarland			Nikolaus Schreiner (Note: Nikolaus Schreiner took office on 4 January 1957.)	SPD
Saarland			Hans-Peter Will (Note: Hans-Peter Will took office on 4 January 1957.)	SPD
West Berlin			Willy Brandt	SPD
West Berlin			Margarete Heise	SPD
West Berlin			Gustav Klingelhöfer	SPD
West Berlin			Wilhelm Königswarter	SPD
West Berlin			Kurt Mattick	SPD
West Berlin			Kurt Neubauer	SPD
West Berlin			Franz Neumann	SPD
West Berlin			Ernst Schellenberg	SPD
West Berlin			Louise Schroeder (Note: Louise Schroeder died on 4 June 1957.)	SPD
West Berlin			Richard Schröter	SPD
West Berlin			Jeanette Wolff	SPD
West Berlin			Josef Grunner (Note: Josef Grunner took office on 11 June 1957, to succeed Louise Schroeder, but later resigned on 21 June 1957.)	SPD
West Berlin			Franz Tausch-Treml (Note: Franz Tausch-Treml took office on 25 June 1957, to succeed Josef Grunner.)	SPD
West Berlin			Ferdinand Friedensburg	CDU
West Berlin			Heinrich Krone	CDU
West Berlin			Ernst Lemmer	CDU
West Berlin			Agnes Katharina Maxsein	CDU
West Berlin			Josef Stingl	CDU
West Berlin			Robert Tillmanns (Note: Robert Tillmanns died on 12 November 1955.)	CDU
West Berlin			Fritz Grantze (Note: Fritz Grantze took office on 17 November 1955, to succeed Robert Tillmanns.)	CDU
West Berlin			Hans Henn	FDP
West Berlin			Karl Hübner	FDP
West Berlin			Marie-Elisabeth Lüders	FDP
West Berlin			Hans Reif	FDP
West Berlin			Rudolf Will	FDP

== See also ==
- Politics of Germany
- List of Bundestag Members
