= Ernst Albrecht =

Ernst Albrecht may refer to:

- Ernst Albrecht (footballer) (1907–1976), German association footballer, played for Fortuna Düsseldorf and the national team
- Ernst Albrecht (politician, born 1914) (1914–1991), German politician, CDU
- Ernst Albrecht (politician, born 1930) (1930–2014), German politician, CDU, Premier of the state of Lower Saxony from 1976 to 1990
- Ernst H. Albrecht (1906–1982), German art director
