= Blöcker =

Blöcker is a surname. Notable people with the surname include:

- Hans Blöcker (1898–1988), German politician
- Herbert Blöcker (1943–2014), German equestrian
