= Jörg van Essen =

German politician (born 1947)

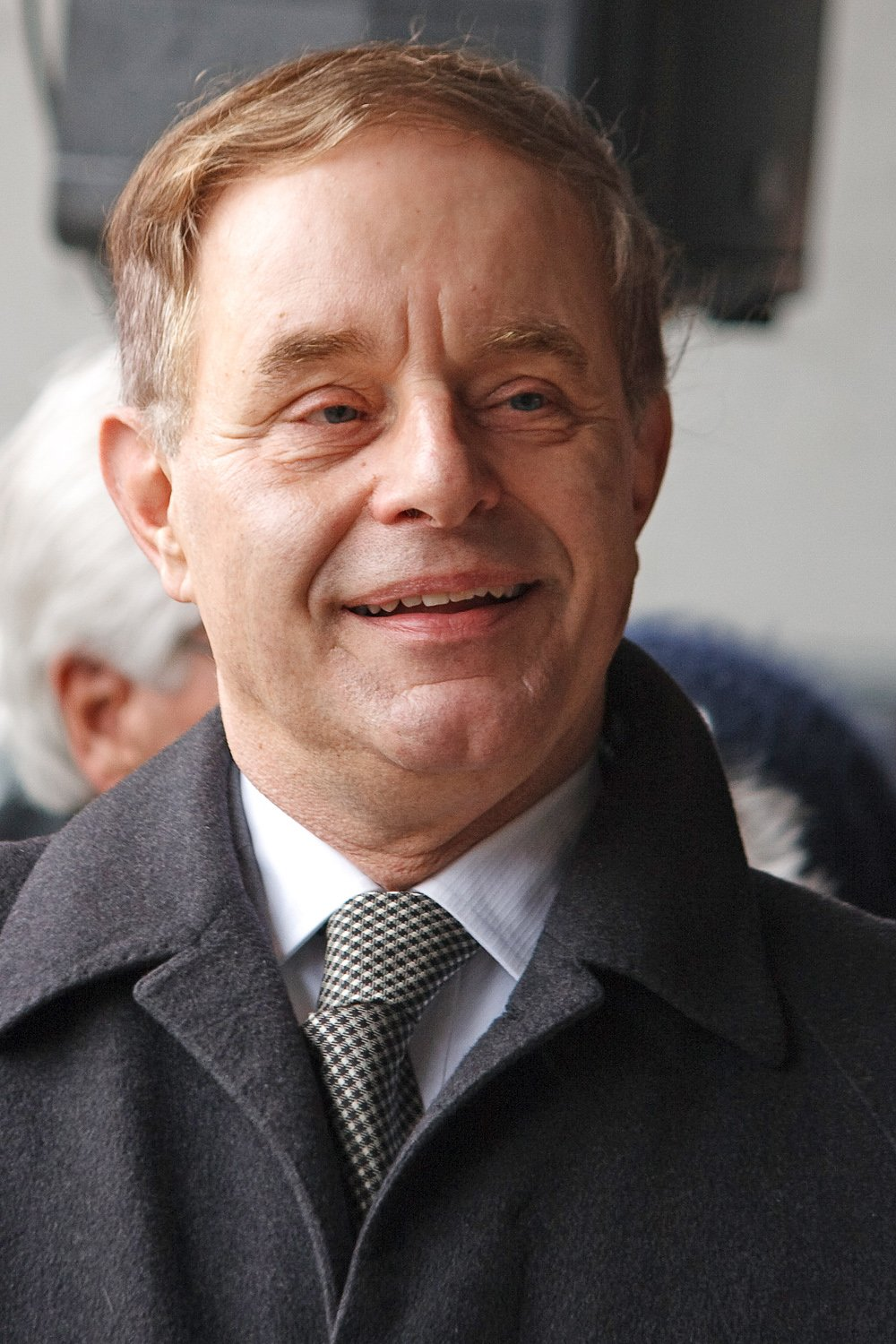

Member of the Bundestag
- In office 20 December 1990 – 2013

Personal details
- Born: 29 September 1947 (age 78) Burscheid
- Party: FDP
- Education: University of Cologne

Jörg van Essen (born 29 September 1947 in Burscheid, North Rhine-Westphalia, Germany) is a German politician of the Free Democratic Party (German: Freie Demokratische Partei; FDP) in the Bundestag.

Van Essen was born in Burscheid and attended a gymnasium in Siegen. He studied law at the University of Cologne from 1968 to 1973. After he finished university he became a prosecutor in Münster, Hagen and Dortmund from 1976 to 1985. Since 1980, van Essen has been a member of the Free Democratic Party and from 1990 to 2013 he was a member of the Bundestag.

Van Essen is openly gay.

== Awards and decorations ==
- 2007: Bundeswehr Cross of Honour in Gold
- 2013: Great Cross of Merit of the Federal Republic of Germany
