= Hans-Joachim Fuchtel =

German politician (born 1952)

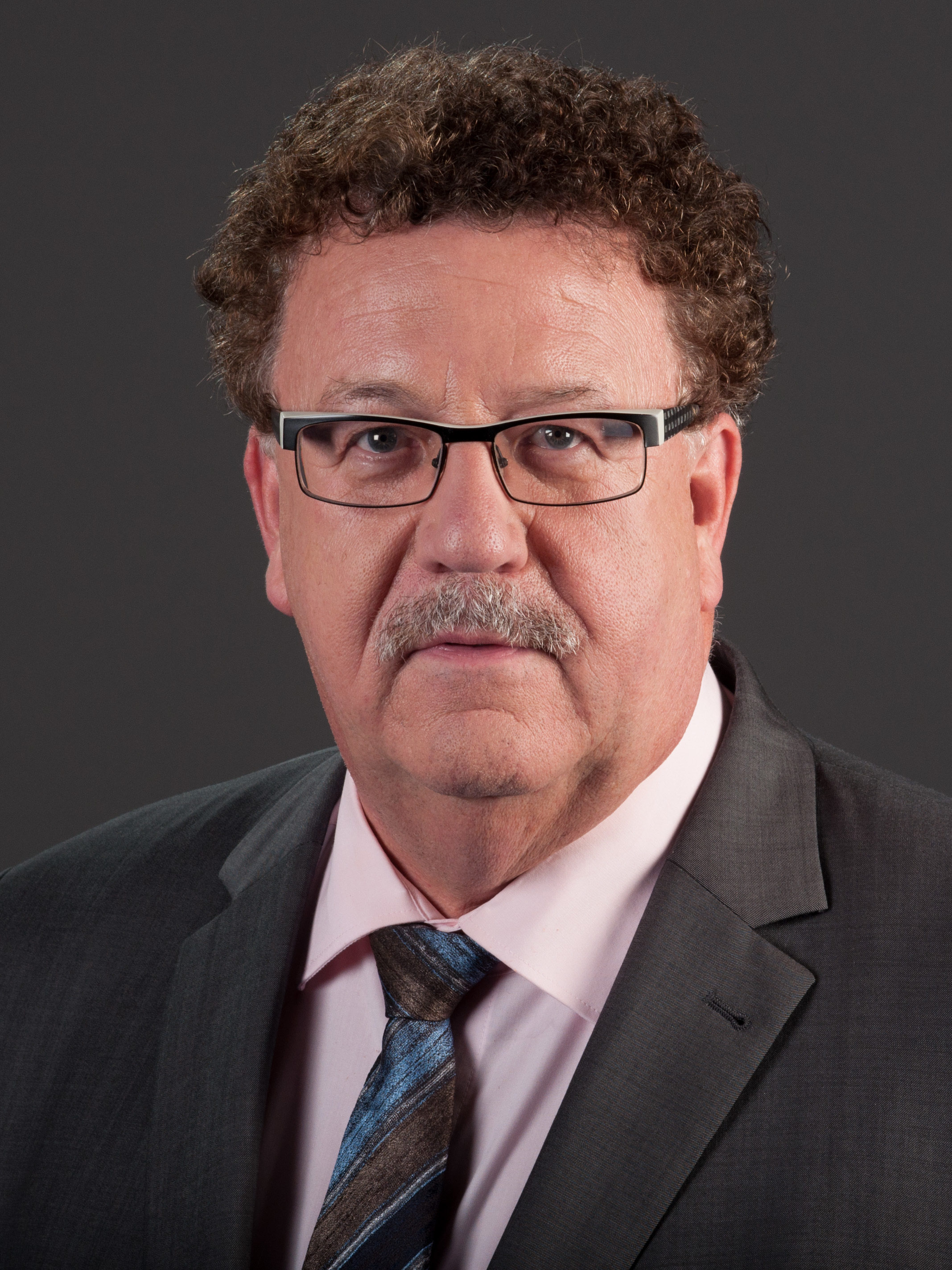
- Fuchtel in 2014

Member of the Bundestag; for Calw
- In office 18 February 1987 – 26 October 2021
- Preceded by: Haimo George
- Succeeded by: Klaus Mack

Personal details
- Born: 13 February 1952 (age 74) Sulz am Neckar, West Germany
- Party: Christian Democratic Union
- Children: 4
- Education: University of Tübingen

Hans-Joachim Fuchtel (born 13 February 1952) is a German lawyer and politician of the Christian Democratic Union (CDU) who served as a member of the Bundestag from the state of Baden-Württemberg from 1987 until 2021. From 2018 to 2021 he also served as Parliamentary State Secretary for Food and Agriculture in the government of Chancellor Angela Merkel.

== Political career ==
Fuchtel first became a member of the Bundestag in the 1987 German federal election, representing the Calw district. For several terms, he served on the Budget Committee (1994-2009) and the Audit Committee (2002-2009). In this capacity, he was his parliamentary group's rapporteur on the annual budget of the Federal Ministry of Labour and Social Affairs, among others. In addition to his committee assignments, he was part of the German delegation to the Inter-Parliamentary Union (IPU) from 1991 until 2009.

In Chancellor Angela Merkel's second coalition government from 2009 to 2013, Fuchtel served (alongside Ralf Brauksiepe) as one of two Parliamentary State Secretaries in the Federal Ministry of Labour and Social Affairs under minister Ursula von der Leyen. In addition to this role, he was appointed as the Chancellor's Personal Envoy to the German-Greek Assembly (DGV) in 2011. In the negotiations to form a Grand Coalition of Merkel's Christian Democrats (CDU together with the Bavarian CSU) and the Social Democrats (SPD) following the 2013 federal elections, he was part of the CDU/CSU delegation in the working group on labor policy, led by von der Leyen and Andrea Nahles.

In Merkel's third cabinet from 2013 to 2017, Fuchtel served (alongside Thomas Silberhorn as one of two Parliamentary State Secretaries at the Federal Ministry of Economic Cooperation and Development under minister Gerd Müller. In the negotiations to form a coalition government following the 2017 federal elections, he was part of the working group on foreign policy, led by von der Leyen, Gerd Müller and Sigmar Gabriel.

In May 2020, Fuchtel announced that he would not stand in the 2021 federal elections but instead resign from active politics by the end of the parliamentary term.

== Other activities ==
- Asian Development Bank (ADB), Ex-Officio Member of the Board of Governors (2013-2018)
- Inter-American Investment Corporation (IIC), Ex-Officio Member of the Board of Governors (2013-2018)
- German Investment Corporation (DEG), Ex-Officio Chairman of the supervisory board (2013-2018)

== Political positions ==
In June 2017, Fuchtel voted against Germany's introduction of same-sex marriage.
