= Josef Brenner =

German politician (1899–1967)

Member of the Bundestag
- In office 5 May 1957 – 6 October 1957

Personal details
- Born: 8 September 1899 Niederfischbach
- Died: 3 May 1967 (aged 67) Koblenz, Rhineland-Palatinate, Germany
- Party: CDU

Josef Brenner (8 September 1899 – 3 May 1967) was a German politician of the Christian Democratic Union (CDU) and former member of the German Bundestag.

== Life ==
Brenner was elected to the city council of Koblenz in 1946. In 1946/47 he was a member of the Advisory State Assembly and then a member of the Rhineland-Palatinate State Parliament until 1951. In the state parliament he was a member of the Budget and Finance Committee, Social Policy Committee and Economic and Reconstruction Committee. He was a member of the German Bundestag from 5 May 1957, when he succeeded Otto Lenz, until the end of the parliamentary term in 1957. He had entered parliament via the Rhineland-Palatinate state list.

== Literature ==
Herbst, Ludolf; Jahn, Bruno (2002). Vierhaus, Rudolf (ed.). Biographisches Handbuch der Mitglieder des Deutschen Bundestages. 1949–2002 [Biographical Handbook of the Members of the German Bundestag. 1949–2002] (in German). München: De Gruyter - De Gruyter Saur. p. 1715. ISBN 978-3-11-184511-1.
