= Klaus Mack =

German politician (born 1973)

Klaus Mack MdB

Member of the Bundestag; for Calw
- Incumbent
- Assumed office 26 October 2021
- Preceded by: Hans-Joachim Fuchtel

Personal details
- Born: 23 April 1973 (age 53) Günzburg, West Germany (now Germany)
- Party: Christian Democratic Union
- Children: 2

Klaus Mack (born 23 April 1973 in Günzburg) is a German politician of the Christian Democratic Union (CDU) who has been serving as a member of the Bundestag since the 2021 elections. Previously, he was mayor of the town of Bad Wildbad from 2006 to 2021 and mayor of the municipality of Enzklösterle from 2000 to 2006.

== Early life and education ==
Mack grew up in the West German town of Lonsee and attended the Helfenstein High School in Geislingen an der Steige, where he graduated in 1992. He then completed an apprenticeship for the higher administrative service at the municipality of Sontheim an der Brenz and at the district office of Heidenheim. From 1994 to 1996, he then studied at the University of Applied Sciences Ludwigsburg - University of Public Administration (FHöV), where he graduated as Diplom-Verwaltungswirt (FH). From 1996 to 1997 he did his civilian service at the Catholic Youth Department Ulm in Lonsee. From 1997 to 2000 he was head of the municipal office and spa manager of the municipality of Enzklösterle.

== Political career ==
=== Career in local politics ===
Mack was mayor of the municipality of Enzklösterle from May 2000 to October 2006. He was mayor of the town of Bad Wildbad from 23 October 2006 to 15 October 2021. In 2014, he was confirmed in office. In addition, he has been a member of the district council in the district of Calw since 2014, where he is deputy chairman of the CDU faction.

Furthermore, he is chairman of the tourism committee of the Gemeindetag Baden-Württemberg and a member of the Kommunalpolitische Vereinigung (KPV).

=== Member of the German Parliament, 2021–present ===
Mack was elected directly to the Bundestag in 2021, representing the Calw district. In parliament, he has since been serving on the Committee on the Environment, Nature Conservation, Nuclear Safety and Consumer Protection. In autumn 2020 Mack was nominated by the CDU as a direct candidate in the federal constituency of Calw for the 2021 federal election. He won the direct mandate with 33.8% of the first votes and was elected to the German Bundestag. His opponent in the constituency was the SPD federal leader Saskia Esken.

Since 2026, Mack has been serving as deputy chair of the CDU/CSU parliamentary group, under the leadership of chairman Thorsten Frei. In this capacity, he oversees the group's legislative activity on climate, the environment, sustainability and development cooperation.

== Other activities ==
- Nuclear Waste Disposal Fund (KENFO), Alternate Member of the Board of Trustees (since 2022)
- Forest Research Institute Baden-Württemberg, Chair of the Advisory Board for a Red Deer Concept in the Northern Black Forest (until 2021)
- Northern Black Forest Regional Association, Chair (since 2019)
- Nature Park Association in the Black Forest Nature Park Central/North, Chair (since 2015)

== Personal life ==
Mack is married and has two children.
