= Hubertus von Golitschek =

German politician (1910–1969)

Hubertus Golitschek

Member of the Bundestag
- In office 7 September 1949 – 1953
- In office 18 April 1956 – 6 October 1957

Personal details
- Born: 22 October 1910 (age 115) Prauß, Kingdom of Prussia, German Empire
- Died: 17 January 1969 (aged 58)
- Party: FDP

Hubertus Golitschek (22 October 1910 – 17 January 1969) was a German politician of the Free Democratic Party (FDP) and former member of the German Bundestag.

== Life ==
He was a member of the German Bundestag during the first legislative period (1949 to 1953) and again from 18 April 1956, when he succeeded Paul Luchtenberg, who had left the parliament, until 1957. In the first legislative period he had entered parliament via the Württemberg-Baden state list, in the second via the North Rhine-Westphalia state list.

== Literature ==
Herbst, Ludolf; Jahn, Bruno (2002). Vierhaus, Rudolf (ed.). Biographisches Handbuch der Mitglieder des Deutschen Bundestages. 1949–2002 [Biographical Handbook of the Members of the German Bundestag. 1949–2002] (in German). München: De Gruyter - De Gruyter Saur. p. 1715. ISBN 978-3-11-184511-1.
