= Johannes Böhm (politician) =

German politician (1890–1957)

Hans Böhm

Member of the Bundestag
- In office 7 September 1949 – 18 July 1957

Personal details
- Born: 8 April 1890 Hochspeyer
- Died: 18 July 1957 (aged 67)
- Party: SPD

Hans Böhm (8 April 1890 – 18 July 1957) was a German politician of the Social Democratic Party (SPD) and former member of the German Bundestag.

== Life ==
Böhm was a member of the state parliament of North Rhine-Westphalia in the first legislative period from 1947 to 1950. In 1947/48 he was also a member of the zone advisory council. He was a member of the German Bundestag from 1949 until his death. In 1949 he was directly elected in the electoral district Bielefeld - Halle. In 1953 he entered the Bundestag via the state list of the SPD.

== Literature ==
Herbst, Ludolf; Jahn, Bruno (2002). Vierhaus, Rudolf (ed.). Biographisches Handbuch der Mitglieder des Deutschen Bundestages. 1949–2002 [Biographical Handbook of the Members of the German Bundestag. 1949–2002] (in German). München: De Gruyter - De Gruyter Saur. p. 1715. ISBN 978-3-11-184511-1.
