= Luise Herklotz =

German politician (1918–2009)

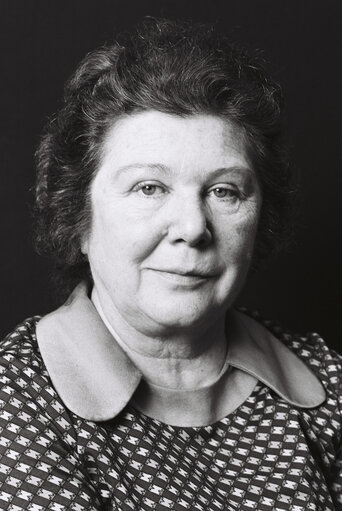
Luise Herklotz

Luise Herklotz (20 August 1918. Speyer – 25 July 2009, Speyer) was a German politician in the SPD.

== Life and profession ==
After attending the Lyzeum, Herklotz, who was of Protestant faith, completed a journalistic apprenticeship at the Speyerer Zeitung from 1935. She then worked first as an editorial secretary and finally as an editor. From 1947, she worked for Die Freiheit in Neustadt an der Weinstraße. In 1948, she took part in the founding of the Journalistenverband Pfalz.

From 1978 to 1992, Herklotz was chairwoman of Arbeiterwohlfahrt in Speyer, of which she had been a member since 1946. In July 1984, an investigation was opened against Herklotz on suspicion of fraud and embezzlement, investigating whether the Association for Civic Education she led had used forged signature lists for "ghost seminars" that were not held to raise 40.000 to 50,000 DM in state subsidies with the help of forged signature lists for "ghost seminars" that were not held, and whether these funds were passed on to the SPD and Workers' Welfare.

== Party ==
Herklotz joined the SPD in 1946 and soon became chairwoman of the SPD women's organization in the Palatinate. She later became a member of the district executive of the SPD in the Palatinate and the Rhineland-Palatinate state committee as well as the central women's committee of the federal SPD. From 1958 to 1962, she was a member of the party executive. In 1970, she was elected to the party's control commission. From 1974 to 1978, she was local chairwoman of the SPD in her hometown of Speyer.

== Member of Parliament ==
Herklotz was a Landtagsabgeordnete in Rhineland-Palatinate from 1949 to October 5, 1957. In 1954, the state parliament elected her as a member of the second Federal Assembly, which re-elected Theodor Heuss as federal president. She was a member of the German Bundestag from September 24, 1956, when she replaced Hermann Trittelvitz, until 1972. From 1966 to 1973, she was also a member of the Parliamentary Assembly of the Council of Europe.

Herklotz was later a member of the European Parliament from 1979 to 1984.

== Honors ==
On September 6, 2003, the city of Speyer awarded Herklotz the honorary citizen right. In 1973, she was awarded the Cross of Merit First Class, which she had refused to accept in 1969, and in June 1984 the Great Federal Cross of Merit of the Order of Merit of the Federal Republic of Germany. In 1986 she received the Marie-Juchacz-Plakette of the Workers' Welfare Association, in 1990 the Medal of Merit of the City of Speyer and in 1999 the Order of Merit of Rhineland-Palatinate.
