= Calw (Bundestag electoral district) =

Electoral district in Germany

280 Calw
- Electoral district for the Bundestag
- Calw in 2025
- State: Baden-Württemberg
- Population: 277,400 (2019)
- Electorate: 199,092 (2021)
- Major settlements: Horb am Neckar; Freudenstadt; Calw
- Area: 1,667.7 km^{2}

Current electoral district
- Created: 1949
- Party: CDU
- Member: Klaus Mack
- Elected: 2021, 2025

Calw is an electoral constituency (German: Wahlkreis) represented in the Bundestag. It elects one member via first-past-the-post voting. Under the current constituency numbering system, it is designated as constituency 280. It is located in western Baden-Württemberg, comprising the districts of Calw and Freudenstadt.

Calw was created for the inaugural 1949 federal election. Since 2021, it has been represented by Klaus Mack of the Christian Democratic Union (CDU).

== Geography ==
Calw is located in western Baden-Württemberg. As of the 2021 federal election, it comprises the districts of Calw and Freudenstadt.

== History ==
Calw was created in 1949. In the 1949 election, it was Württemberg-Hohenzollern constituency 2 in the numbering system. In the 1953 through 1961 elections, it was number 191. In the 1965 through 1976 elections, it was number 195. In the 1980 through 1998 elections, it was number 184. In the 2002 and 2005 elections, it was number 281. Since the 2009 election, it has been number 280.

Originally, the constituency comprised the districts of Calw, Freudenstadt, and Horb. It acquired its current borders in the 1980 election.

Election	No.	Name	Borders
1949	2	Calw	Calw district; Freudenstadt district; Horb district
1953	191	Calw	Calw district; Freudenstadt district; Horb district
1957	191	Calw	Calw district; Freudenstadt district; Horb district
1961	191	Calw	Calw district; Freudenstadt district; Horb district
1965	195	Calw	Calw district; Freudenstadt district; Horb district
1969	195	Calw	Calw district; Freudenstadt district; Horb district
1972	195	Calw	Calw district; Freudenstadt district; Horb district
1976	195	Calw	Calw district; Freudenstadt district; Horb district
1980	184	Calw	Calw district; Freudenstadt district
1983	184	Calw	Calw district; Freudenstadt district
1987	184	Calw	Calw district; Freudenstadt district
1990	184	Calw	Calw district; Freudenstadt district
1994	184	Calw	Calw district; Freudenstadt district
1998	184	Calw	Calw district; Freudenstadt district
2002	281	Calw	Calw district; Freudenstadt district
2005	281	Calw	Calw district; Freudenstadt district
2009	280	Calw	Calw district; Freudenstadt district
2013	280	Calw	Calw district; Freudenstadt district
2017	280	Calw	Calw district; Freudenstadt district
2021	280	Calw	Calw district; Freudenstadt district
2025	280	Calw	Calw district; Freudenstadt district

== Members ==
The constituency has been held continuously by Christian Democratic Union (CDU) since its creation. It was first represented by Fritz Schuler from 1949 to 1957, followed by Arved Deringer from 1957 to 1965. Helmut Prassler was representative from 1965 to 1976, followed by Haimo George from 1976 to 1987. Hans-Joachim Fuchtel was representative from 1987 to 2021, a total of nine consecutive terms. He was succeeded by Klaus Mack in 2021.

Election	Member	Party	%
1949	Fritz Schuler	CDU	46.6
1953	Fritz Schuler	CDU	43.2
1957	Arved Deringer	CDU	44.7
1961	Arved Deringer	CDU	36.2
1965	Helmut Prassler	CDU	46.2
1969	Helmut Prassler	CDU	53.0
1972	Helmut Prassler	CDU	54.1
1976	Haimo George	CDU	56.7
1980	Haimo George	CDU	55.2
1983	Haimo George	CDU	62.2
1987	Hans-Joachim Fuchtel	CDU	54.9
1990	Hans-Joachim Fuchtel	CDU	53.8
1994	Hans-Joachim Fuchtel	CDU	53.0
1998	Hans-Joachim Fuchtel	CDU	47.6
2002	Hans-Joachim Fuchtel	CDU	49.3
2005	Hans-Joachim Fuchtel	CDU	49.2
2009	Hans-Joachim Fuchtel	CDU	46.3
2013	Hans-Joachim Fuchtel	CDU	58.5
2017	Hans-Joachim Fuchtel	CDU	43.3
2021	Klaus Mack	CDU	33.8
2025	Klaus Mack	CDU	39.0

== Election results ==
=== 2025 election ===
Federal election (2025): Calw
Notes:	Blue background denotes the winner of the electorate vote. Pink background denotes a candidate elected from their party list. Yellow background denotes an electorate win by a list member, or other incumbent. A ✓ or ✗ denotes status of any incumbent, win or lose respectively.						
Party	Candidate	Votes	%	±%	Party votes	%	±%
CDU	✓ Klaus Mack	63,396	39.0	▲5.2	55,072	33.8	▲5.6
AfD	Raimond Lamparter	39,321	24.2	▲11.9	41,608	25.6	▲12.7
SPD	Saskia Esken	20,936	12.9	▼4.3	19,865	12.2	▼6.6
Greens	Thea Trinh	13,187	8.1	▼3.6	14,354	8.8	▼2.6
FDP	Jan Stöffler	6,842	4.2	▼10.8	9,667	5.9	▼11.7
Left	Thomas Hanser	6,312	3.9	▲1.9	7,650	4.7	▲1.3
Tierschutzpartei	Dirk Witzelmaier	2,426	1.5	▼0.3	1,520	0.9	▼0.5
Bündnis C	Johannes Bender	2,021	1.2		1,325	0.8	▲0.8
Volt	Yannic Walheim	1,523	0.9		898	0.6	▲0.4
BD	Frank Negwer	619	0.4		264	0.2	
BSW					6,523	4.0	
dieBasis					536	0.3	▼1.6
PARTEI					505	0.3	▼0.5
Pirates							▼0.3
ÖDP					322	0.2	▼0.1
Gesundheitsforschung							▼0.1
Humanists							▼0.1
MLPD					28	0.0	0.0
Informal votes		1,275			868		
Total valid votes		162,401			162,808		
Turnout		163,676	82.9	▲6.1			
CDU hold	Majority			▲5.2			

=== 2021 election ===
Federal election (2021): Calw
Notes:	Blue background denotes the winner of the electorate vote. Pink background denotes a candidate elected from their party list. Yellow background denotes an electorate win by a list member, or other incumbent. A ✓ or ✗ denotes status of any incumbent, win or lose respectively.						
Party	Candidate	Votes	%	±%	Party votes	%	±%
CDU	Klaus Mack	51,208	33.8	▼9.5	42,841	28.3	▼8.9
SPD	Saskia Esken	26,111	17.2	▲0.4	28,571	18.8	▲4.4
FDP	Michael König	22,685	15.0	▲5.6	26,770	17.7	▲3.4
AfD	Marcus Lotzin	18,668	12.3	▼1.8	19,473	12.8	▼2.1
Greens	Sara Haug	17,712	11.7	▲2.9	17,301	11.4	▲1.5
FW	Markus Mast	4,202	2.8	▲1.7	3,076	2.0	▲1.3
dieBasis	Egon Nagel	3,083	2.0		2,992	2.0	
Left	Thomas Hanser	2,998	2.0	▼2.5	3,656	2.4	▼2.7
Tierschutzpartei	Dirk Witzelmaier	2,749	1.8	▲0.5	2,232	1.5	▲0.6
PARTEI	Yvonne Vogler	1,526	1.0		1,155	0.8	▲0.3
Bündnis C					795	0.5	
Team Todenhöfer					529	0.3	
Pirates					477	0.3	▼0.1
ÖDP					451	0.3	0.0
KlimalisteBW	Tina Frey	391	0.3				
Volt					253	0.2	
Bürgerbewegung					202	0.1	
NPD					197	0.1	▼0.2
Gesundheitsforschung					189	0.1	
Humanists					116	0.1	
DiB					109	0.1	0.0
LKR	Frank Negwer	180	0.1		98	0.1	
Bündnis 21					48	0.0	
MLPD					29	0.0	0.0
DKP					28	0.0	0.0
Informal votes		1,350			1,275		
Total valid votes		151,513			151,588		
Turnout		152,863	76.8	▼0.7			
CDU hold	Majority	25,097	16.6	▼9.9			

=== 2017 election ===
Federal election (2017): Calw
Notes:	Blue background denotes the winner of the electorate vote. Pink background denotes a candidate elected from their party list. Yellow background denotes an electorate win by a list member, or other incumbent. A ✓ or ✗ denotes status of any incumbent, win or lose respectively.						
Party	Candidate	Votes	%	±%	Party votes	%	±%
CDU	✓ Hans-Joachim Fuchtel	65,676	43.3	▼15.2	56,330	37.2	▼14.0
SPD	Saskia Esken	25,601	16.9	▼3.4	21,832	14.4	▼3.2
AfD	Uwe Burkart	21,431	14.1		22,715	15.0	▲8.7
FDP	Lutz Hermann	14,154	9.3	▲6.5	21,646	14.3	▲7.9
Greens	Andreas Kubesch	13,284	8.8	▲1.7	14,989	9.9	▲2.2
Left	Lorena Müllner	6,832	4.5	▲0.2	7,759	5.1	▲1.0
Tierschutzpartei	Dirk Witzelmaier	2,008	1.3		1,391	0.9	▲0.2
FW	Wolfgang Maurer	1,596	1.1	▼0.5	1,137	0.7	0.0
PARTEI					725	0.5	
Pirates	Heiko Eisenbrückner	969	0.6	▼1.5	610	0.4	▼1.4
NPD					496	0.3	▼0.9
ÖDP					451	0.3	▼0.1
DM					323	0.2	
Tierschutzallianz					287	0.2	
BGE					242	0.2	
V-Partei³					181	0.1	
Menschliche Welt					161	0.1	
DiB					159	0.1	
MLPD	Roberto Kyas	173	0.1		90	0.1	0.0
DIE RECHTE					67	0.0	
DKP					14	0.0	
Informal votes		1,739			1,858		
Total valid votes		151,724			151,605		
Turnout		153,463	77.5	▲4.1			
CDU hold	Majority	40,075	26.4	▼11.9			

=== 2013 election ===
Federal election (2013): Calw
Notes:	Blue background denotes the winner of the electorate vote. Pink background denotes a candidate elected from their party list. Yellow background denotes an electorate win by a list member, or other incumbent. A ✓ or ✗ denotes status of any incumbent, win or lose respectively.						
Party	Candidate	Votes	%	±%	Party votes	%	±%
CDU	✓ Hans-Joachim Fuchtel	83,514	58.5	▲12.2	73,263	51.1	▲13.1
SPD	Saskia Esken	28,892	20.2	▲0.1	25,285	17.6	▲0.2
Greens	Dietmar Lust	10,036	7.0	▼2.6	10,946	7.6	▼2.7
Left	Franz Groll	6,094	4.3	▼2.3	5,948	4.2	▼2.6
FDP	Reinhard Günther	4,072	2.9	▼9.7	9,194	6.4	▼13.7
AfD					9,013	6.3	
Pirates	Adrian Friese	3,038	2.1		2,642	1.8	▲0.1
FW	Wolfgang Maurer	2,270	1.6		1,017	0.7	
NPD	Rudolf Schützinger	2,107	1.5	▲0.1	1,689	1.2	▼0.1
Tierschutzpartei					995	0.7	0.0
REP	Lothar Seidemann	1,522	1.1	▼0.5	904	0.6	▼0.8
PBC					796	0.6	▼0.7
ÖDP	Verena Föttinger	1,164	0.8		524	0.4	0.0
RENTNER					410	0.3	
Volksabstimmung					257	0.2	▼0.1
PRO					122	0.1	
Party of Reason					117	0.1	
BIG					88	0.1	
MLPD					39	0.0	0.0
BüSo					21	0.0	0.0
Informal votes		2,442			1,881		
Total valid votes		142,709			143,270		
Turnout		145,151	73.4	▲1.6			
CDU hold	Majority	54,622	38.3	▲12.2			

=== 2009 election ===
Federal election (2009): Calw
Notes:	Blue background denotes the winner of the electorate vote. Pink background denotes a candidate elected from their party list. Yellow background denotes an electorate win by a list member, or other incumbent. A ✓ or ✗ denotes status of any incumbent, win or lose respectively.						
Party	Candidate	Votes	%	±%	Party votes	%	±%
CDU	✓ Hans-Joachim Fuchtel	64,808	46.3	▼2.9	53,358	38.0	▼5.1
SPD	Saskia Esken	28,255	20.2	▼10.1	24,450	17.4	▼9.2
FDP	Reinhard Freitag	17,528	12.5	▲5.0	28,260	20.1	▲7.3
Greens	Charlotte Michel-Biegel	13,460	9.6	▲4.3	14,464	10.3	▲2.3
Left	Franz Groll	9,136	6.5	▲3.3	9,537	6.8	▲3.5
Pirates					2,390	1.7	
PBC	Walter Robbe	2,661	1.9	▼0.5	1,698	1.2	▼0.5
REP	Lothar Seidemann	2,172	1.6		1,955	1.4	▼0.1
NPD	Rudolf Schützinger	1,915	1.4	▼0.7	1,813	1.3	▼0.2
Tierschutzpartei					1,023	0.7	
ÖDP					464	0.3	
Volksabstimmung					325	0.2	
DIE VIOLETTEN					277	0.2	
MLPD					72	0.1	0.0
DVU					70	0.0	
BüSo					68	0.0	0.0
ADM					51	0.0	
Informal votes		2,877			2,537		
Total valid votes		139,935			140,275		
Turnout		142,812	71.8	▼5.7			
CDU hold	Majority	36,553	26.1	▲7.2			

=== 2005 election ===
Federal election (2005):Calw
Notes:	Blue background denotes the winner of the electorate vote. Pink background denotes a candidate elected from their party list. Yellow background denotes an electorate win by a list member, or other incumbent. A ✓ or ✗ denotes status of any incumbent, win or lose respectively.						
Party	Candidate	Votes	%	±%	Party votes	%	±%
CDU	✓ Hans-Joachim Fuchtel	74,513	49.2	▼0.1	65,367	43.2	▼5.2
SPD	Renate Gradistanac	45,838	30.3	▼2.5	40,263	26.6	▼2.7
FDP	Karl Braun	11,449	7.6	▼0.2	19,478	12.9	▲5.0
Greens	Charlotte Michel-Biegel	8,023	5.3	▼1.3	12,163	8.0	▼0.9
Left	Herbert Scheiblich	4,813	3.2	▲2.3	4,942	3.3	▲2.5
PBC	Walter Robbe	3,567	2.4	▼0.1	2,646	1.7	▲0.2
NPD	Stephan Wochele	3,117	2.1		2,229	1.5	▲1.2
REP					2,192	1.4	▲0.3
Familie					1,204	0.8	
GRAUEN					661	0.4	▲0.3
MLPD					123	0.1	
BüSo					107	0.1	
Informal votes		2,633			2,578		
Total valid votes		151,320			151,375		
Turnout		153,953	77.5	▼2.5			
CDU hold	Majority	28,675	18.9				
