= Karl Walz =

German politician

Member of the Bundestag
- In office 6 October 1953 – 6 October 1957

Personal details
- Born: 22 October 1900 Ludwigshafen am Rhein
- Died: 17 April 1990 (aged 89) Saarbrücken, Saarland, Germany
- Party: CDU

Karl Walz (22 October 1900 – 17 April 1990) was a German politician of the Christian Democratic Union (CDU) and former member of the German Bundestag.

== Life ==
In 1953 Walz was elected to the German Bundestag on the Rhineland-Palatinate CDU state list and was therefore expatriated from Saarland. He then settled in Trier together with his family until the referendum. In the Bundestag he was one of the opponents of the Saar Statute.

== Literature ==
Herbst, Ludolf; Jahn, Bruno (2002). Vierhaus, Rudolf (ed.). Biographisches Handbuch der Mitglieder des Deutschen Bundestages. 1949–2002 [Biographical Handbook of the Members of the German Bundestag. 1949–2002] (in German). München: De Gruyter - De Gruyter Saur. p. 1715. ISBN 978-3-11-184511-1.
