= Wilhelm Naegel =

German politician (1904–1956)

Member of the Bundestag
- In office 7 September 1949 – 24 May 1956

Personal details
- Born: 3 August 1904
- Died: 24 May 1956 (aged 51)
- Party: CDU

Wilhelm Naegel (August 3, 1904 – May 24, 1956) was a German politician of the Christian Democratic Union (CDU) and former member of the German Bundestag.

== Life ==
On 23 August 1946 he became a member of the Appointed Parliament of Hanover and on 9 December he became a member of the Appointed Parliament of Lower Saxony. He was a member of the Appointed Parliament of that state during the first legislative period from 20 April 1947 to 18 June 1947. In the 1949 federal elections, Naegel was elected to the German Bundestag on the CDU's state list, of which he was a member until his death. From 8 October 1953, he was chairman of the Bundestag's Committee on Economic Policy.

== Literature ==
Herbst, Ludolf; Jahn, Bruno (2002). Vierhaus, Rudolf (ed.). Biographisches Handbuch der Mitglieder des Deutschen Bundestages. 1949–2002 [Biographical Handbook of the Members of the German Bundestag. 1949–2002] (in German). München: De Gruyter - De Gruyter Saur. p. 1715. ISBN 978-3-11-184511-1.
