= Hermann Berg =

German politician

Member of the Bundestag
- In office 27 June 1955 – 6 October 1957

Personal details
- Born: 29 August 1905 Altena
- Died: 21 October 1982 (aged 77)
- Party: FDP

Hermann Berg (29 August 1905 – 21 October 1982) was a German politician of the Free Democratic Party (FDP) and former member of the German Bundestag.

== Life ==
Berg was a member of the German Bundestag from 27 June 1955, when he succeeded the late Carl Wirths, until 1957.

== Literature ==
Herbst, Ludolf; Jahn, Bruno (2002). Vierhaus, Rudolf (ed.). Biographisches Handbuch der Mitglieder des Deutschen Bundestages. 1949–2002 [Biographical Handbook of the Members of the German Bundestag. 1949–2002] (in German). München: De Gruyter - De Gruyter Saur. p. 1715. ISBN 978-3-11-184511-1.
