= Emmi Welter =

German politician (1887–1971)

Emilie "Emmi" Florine Auguste Welter (née Merten; 7 August 1887 – 10 March 1971) was a German politician. She was a Member of the Bundestag from the Christian Democratic Union in the 1950s and 1960s.

== Biography ==
Welter, who came from a liberal Protestant family and was influenced by two world wars, the Weimar Republic and the Third Reich, fought at a young age for a modern position for women in society, against their oppression in their choice and practice of their professions, and against their imposed role as exclusively active housewives and mothers with social commitment. In the 1920s, she was the first woman in the presbytery of her congregation in Aachen and chairwoman of the Evangelical Women's Aid in the Rhineland, where she was particularly instrumental in promoting the legal equality of female theologians with their male colleagues.

In 1945, Welter joined the Christian Democratic Party in Aachen, which was founded in the same year under the supervision of the military administration, which was renamed the Christian Democratic Union (CDU) on 16/17 December 1945 in Bad Godesberg. Only one year later, on August 20, 1946, she was one of the founding members of the Women's Union in the Aachen section, together with Clementine Norres and Helene Weber, which the committed women's rights activist had led as its elected chairwoman from 1955 to 1966. At the same time as she joined the Müttergenesungswerk in 1950, Emmi Welter was also elected to the council of the city of Aachen. She retained this mandate until 1961 and only gave it up due to her dual role as a member of the Bundestag.

Welter had replaced Walther Kolbe, who died on 25 December 1953, on 4 January 1954. In the 1961 and 1965 Bundestag elections, she was elected to parliament on the North Rhine-Westphalia state list. She was a member of the Committee on Cultural Policy (later the Committee on Cultural Policy and Journalism), the Committee on Public Welfare (later the Committee on Local Policy and Public Welfare), the Committee on Petitions, the Committee on Family and Youth Issues and the Health Committee. In the German Bundestag, she was significantly involved in laws for the equalisation of family burdens, the Youth Welfare Act and social welfare legislation.

From September 1953, Welter was active in the Evangelical Action Group for Family Issues (EAF), founded by Friedrich Münchmeyer and Hansjürg Ranke. This body, which had merged with the Family Federation of German Catholics and the German Family Association in the spring of 1954, also led her as first chairwoman from 1957 to 1962.
