= Hermann Conring (politician) =

German politician (1894–1989)

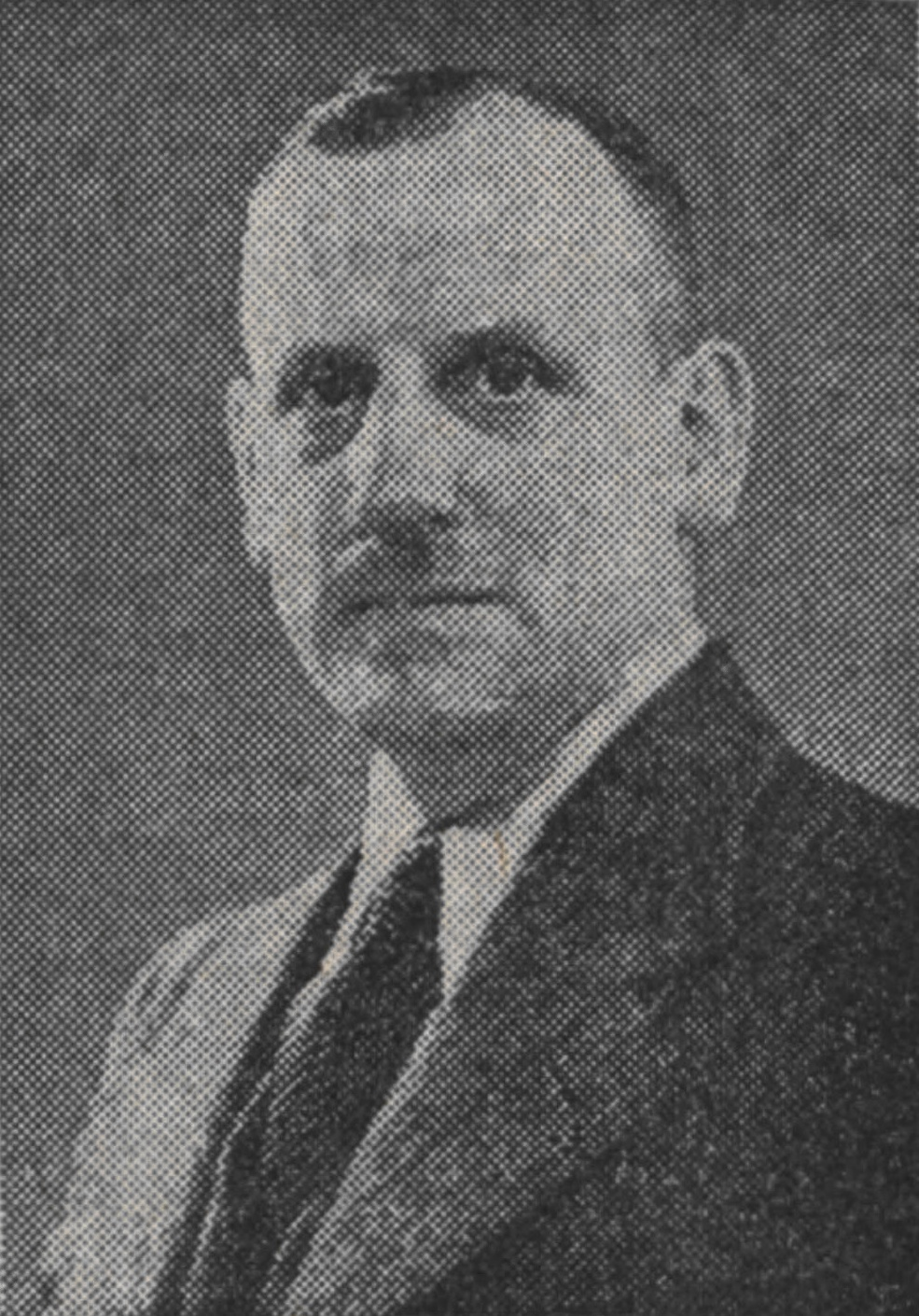
- Hermann Conring

Member of the Bundestag
- In office 6 October 1953 – 19 October 1969

Personal details
- Born: 4 November 1894 Aurich
- Died: 9 February 1989 (aged 94) Weener, Lower Saxony, Germany
- Party: CDU

Hermann Conring (November 4, 1894 – February 9, 1989) was a German politician of the Christian Democratic Union (CDU) and former member of the German Bundestag. During the Nazi era he was a provincial commissioner in Groningen, Netherlands.

== Life ==
In April 1953, he was directly elected to the Lower Saxony Landtag as a substitute for Louis Thelemann, where he remained until 1955. After joining the CDU, he won the direct mandate in the 1953 federal election in the constituency of Leer and was a member of the German Bundestag until 1969. In the fifth legislative period of the Bundestag, he was the third-oldest parliamentarian after Konrad Adenauer and Arthur Enk. From 5 May 1964 to 1969 he was deputy chairman of the Bundestag's Budget Committee.

== Literature ==
Herbst, Ludolf; Jahn, Bruno (2002). Vierhaus, Rudolf (ed.). Biographisches Handbuch der Mitglieder des Deutschen Bundestages. 1949–2002 [Biographical Handbook of the Members of the German Bundestag. 1949–2002] (in German). München: De Gruyter - De Gruyter Saur. p. 1715. ISBN 978-3-11-184511-1.
