= Peter Wilhelm Brand =

German politician (1900–1978)

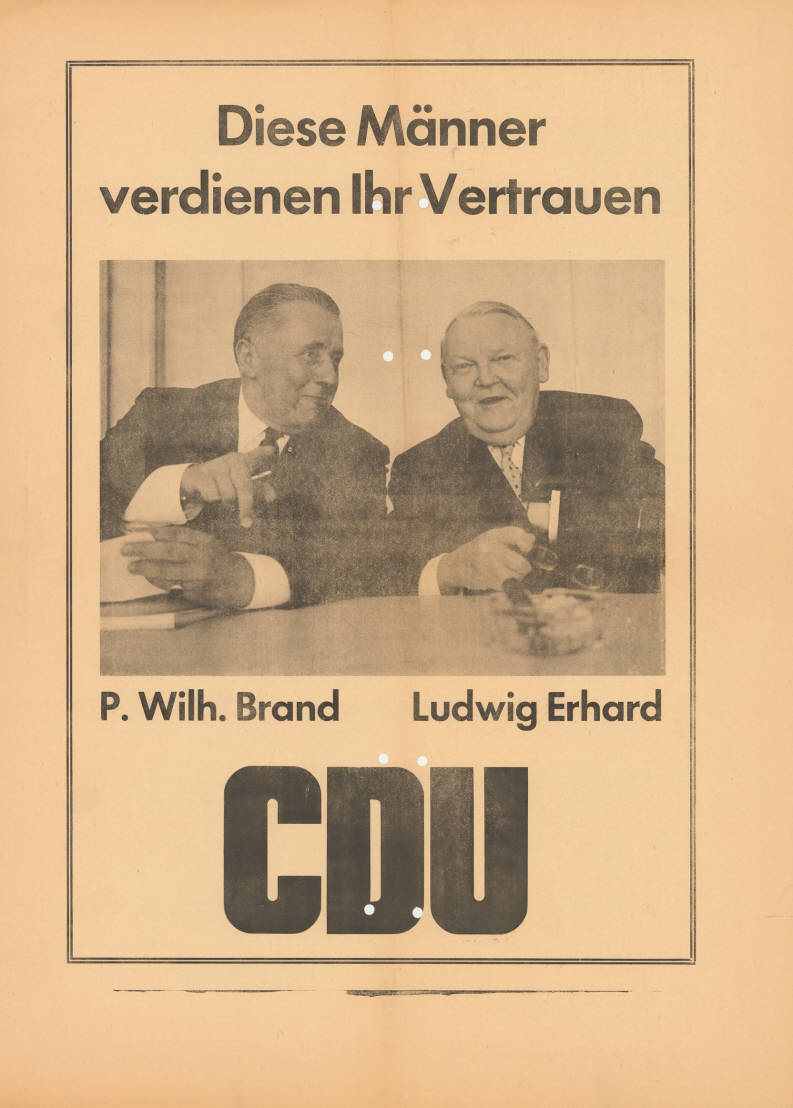
- Peter Wilhelm Brand, together with Ludwig Erhard on an election poster

Member of the Bundestag
- In office 6 October 1953 – 19 October 1969

Personal details
- Born: 3 August 1900 Remscheid
- Died: 1 August 1978 (aged 77) Remscheid, North Rhine-Westphalia, Germany
- Party: CDU

Peter Wilhelm Brand (August 3, 1900 – August 1, 1978) was a German politician of the Christian Democratic Union (CDU) and former member of the German Bundestag.

== Life ==
Brand was a member of the CDU and belonged to the district executive committee in Remscheid. Member of Parliament

He was a member of the German Bundestag from 1953 to 1969. From 1964 to 1969 he was deputy chairman of the CDU/CSU parliamentary group. From 1961 to 1969 he was Deputy Chairman of the Bundestag Committee for Economic and SME Issues. Brand initially represented the Rhein-Wupper-Kreis - Leverkusen constituency in parliament, and from 1965 the Remscheid constituency.

== Literature ==
Herbst, Ludolf; Jahn, Bruno (2002). Vierhaus, Rudolf (ed.). Biographisches Handbuch der Mitglieder des Deutschen Bundestages. 1949–2002 [Biographical Handbook of the Members of the German Bundestag. 1949–2002] (in German). München: De Gruyter - De Gruyter Saur. p. 1715. ISBN 978-3-11-184511-1.
