= Burscheid =

- Town
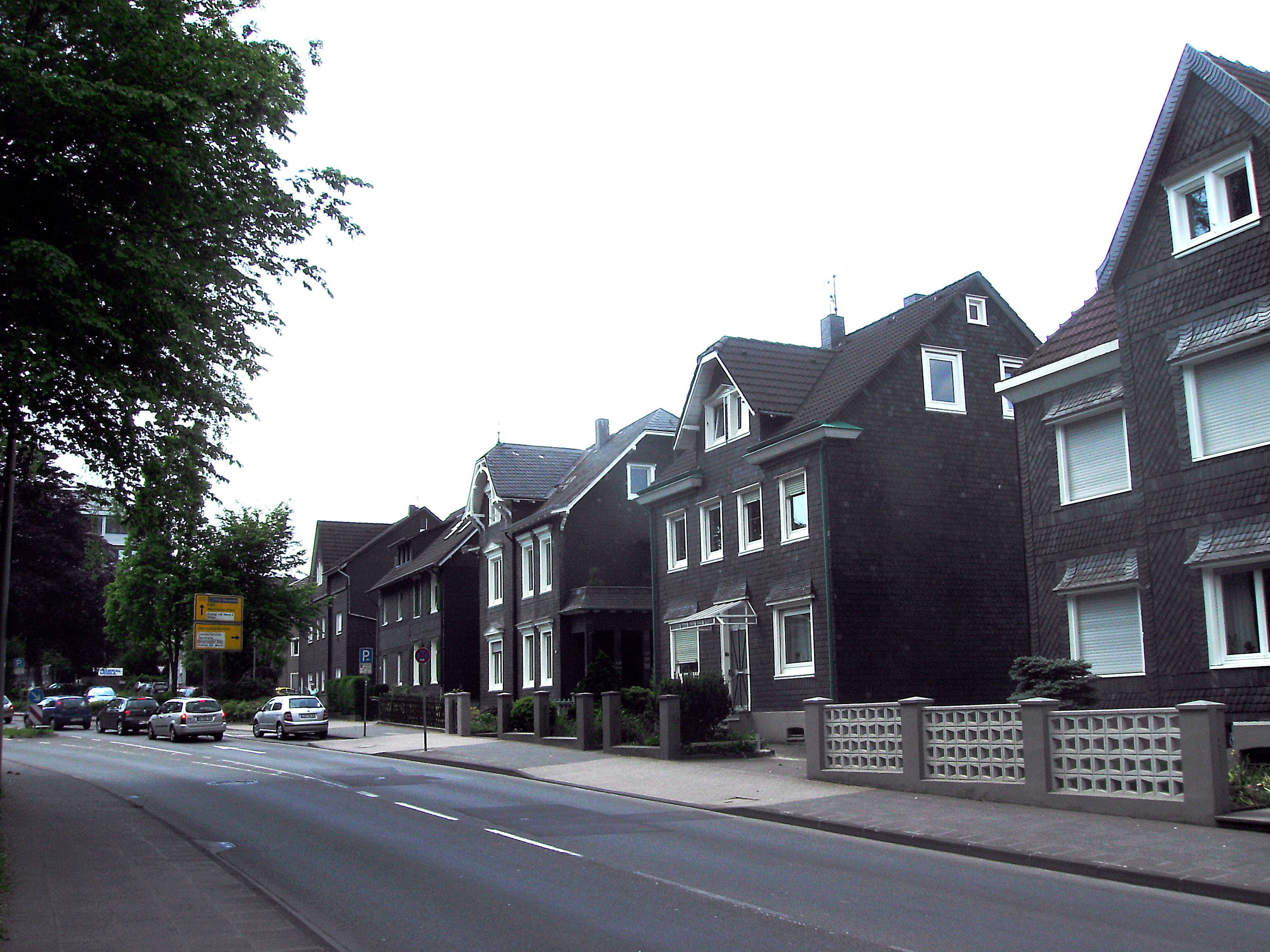

- Flag Coat of arms

- Location of Burscheid within Rheinisch-Bergischer Kreis district
- Interactive map of Burscheid
- Location within Germany Location within North Rhine-Westphalia
- Coordinates: 51°06′00″N 07°07′00″E
- Country: Germany
- State: North Rhine-Westphalia
- Admin. region: Köln
- District: Rheinisch-Bergischer Kreis
- Subdivisions: 89

Government
  - Mayor (2020–25): Stefan Caplan (CDU)

Area
  - Total: 27.33 km^{2} (10.55 sq mi)
- Elevation: 88–251 m (289–823 ft)

Population (2025-12-31)
  - Total: 19,104
  - Density: 699.0/km^{2} (1,810/sq mi)
- Time zone: UTC+01:00 (CET)
  - Summer (DST): UTC+02:00 (CEST)
- Postal codes: 51399
- Dialling codes: 02174
- Vehicle registration: GL
- Website: www.burscheid.de

Burscheid (German pronunciation: [ˈbʊʁʃaɪt]) is a town in the Rheinisch-Bergischer district, in North Rhine-Westphalia, Germany. The town is known for its sub-communities (somewhat equivalent to the American concept of neighborhoods) and the town centre with its marketplace and churches.

== Population ==
Historical population

Year	Pop.	±% p.a.
1965	15,117	—
1970	15,653	+0.70%
1975	16,102	+0.57%
1980	15,609	−0.62%
1985	15,351	−0.33%
1990	17,312	+2.43%
1995	18,289	+1.10%

Year	Pop.	±% p.a.
2000	19,125	+0.90%
2005	19,122	−0.00%
2010	18,603	−0.55%
2015	18,256	−0.38%
2020	18,527	+0.30%
2025	19,104	+0.62%

Source: Landesdatabank Nordrhein-Westfalen

== Economy ==
The two largest employers in Burscheid are Federal Mogul GmbH (formerly known as Goetze AG) and Johnson Controls.

== Government ==
The current mayor is Stefan Caplan (CDU), first elected in 2014 and re-elected in September 2020.

The current city council was elected with the following breakdown of political affiliations, as of the 2020 local election:

- CDU: 14 seats
- Bündnis für Burscheid: 8 seats
- SPD: 7 seats
- Grüne: 7 seats
- FDP: 2 seats
- UWG: 2 seats

== Geography ==
Burscheid is on the A1 Autobahn, and federal highway (Bundesstraße) 51 travels through the town. The Verkehrsverbund Rhein-Sieg and Verkehrsverbund Rhein-Ruhr both operate bus lines that stop in Burscheid. Burscheid is within 15 kilometers of both Solingen and Leverkusen.

=== Sub-communities ===
Bellinghausen - Benninhausen - Berghamberg - Berringhausen - Blasberg - Dierath - Dünweg - Dürscheid - Großbruch - Großhamberg - Grünscheid - Heddinghofen - Hilgen - Kaltenherberg - Kämersheide - Kippekofen - Kleinhamberg - Kuckenberg - Lungstraße - Nagelsbaum - Oberlandscheid - Oberwietsche - Ösinghausen- Repinghofen - Rötzinghofen - Sträßchen.

Hilgen (or Burscheid-Hilgen) is the second largest and most significant sub-community, next to the main town center (Burscheid itself). Hilgen is on the town's border with Wermelskirchen and has many of its own shops and restaurants. Most sub-communities in Burscheid are easily reachable by foot or bicycle.

== Services ==
Burscheid has its own public schools, swimming pool and volunteer fire department.

== Tourist sites ==
- Haus Landscheid is a former estate that belonged to the knight Heinrich von Nesselrode in 1731. It was the site of a restaurant from 1983 to 1998, but was abandoned from 1998 until recently. It is now a hotel and restaurant (updated Oct 2014).
- The Lambertsmühle (Lamberts Mill) is in the Wiehbach valley in the southwest of the town, and has been a museum since 1994. The mill's main exhibit is entitled "The Path from Grain to Bread."
- The Paffenlöher Steffi (in the neighboring community of Paffenlöh) is a local dance club.

== Personalities ==
=== Honorary citizen ===
- Paul Luchtenberg (1890-1973), co-founder of the FDP, Member of Bundestag, minister of culture of the state of North Rhine-Westphalia.
- Wilhelm Schmidt, mayor of the town of Burscheid from 1894 to 1928
- Hugo Bernd, powder-wheeler
- Erich Richartz-Bertrams, (died 1973), industrialist and patron
- Ewald Sträßer (Burscheid, 1867 - Stuttgart, 1933), compositor

=== Sons and daughters of the city ===
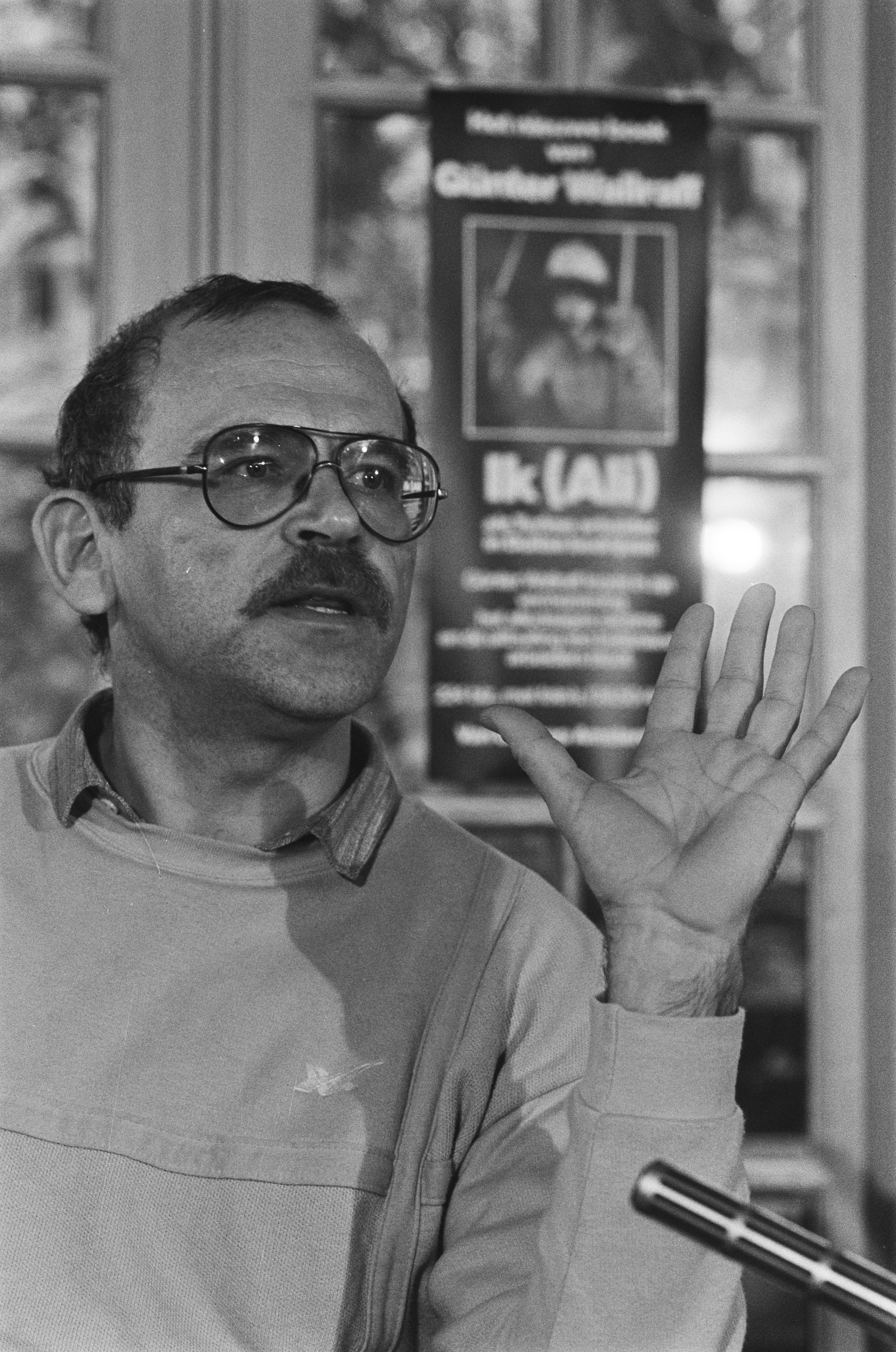
Günter Wallraff 1985

- Carl Pulfrich (1858-1927), physicist and optician
- Günter Wallraff (b. 1942), writer and undercover journalist

=== Other personalities ===
- Rüdiger Vollborn, (b. 1963), former Bundesliga goalkeeper of the neighboring football club Bayer 04 Leverkusen
- Karlheinz Stockhausen composer, (1928-2007), visited once the Burscheider Bürgerschule.
- Uwe Boll, (b. 1965), German director, producer and screenwriter
- Silke Gnad, (b. 1966), former national handball player
- Hansi Gnad, (b. 1963), former national basketball player
