= Fritz Schuler (politician, born 1885) =

German politician

Member of the Bundestag; for Calw
- In office 7 September 1949 – 30 July 1955
- Preceded by: Constituency established
- Succeeded by: Christian Leibing

Personal details
- Born: 12 April 1885 Altensteig, Germany
- Died: 30 July 1955 (aged 70) Calw, West Germany
- Party: Christian Democratic Union

Fritz Schuler (12 April 1885 – 30 July 1955) was a German politician of the Christian Democratic Union (CDU) and former member of the German Bundestag.

== Life ==
In 1946 he became a member of the Württemberg State Church Congress in Stuttgart. On 17 November 1946 he was elected to the Consultative State Assembly and on 18 May 1947 to the first state parliament of the state of Württemberg-Hohenzollern. He was a member of the German Bundestag from the first Bundestag election in 1949 until his death. In 1949, as in 1953, he represented the electoral district of Calw as a delegate sent out in direct election.

== Literature ==
Herbst, Ludolf; Jahn, Bruno (2002). Vierhaus, Rudolf (ed.). Biographisches Handbuch der Mitglieder des Deutschen Bundestages. 1949–2002 [Biographical Handbook of the Members of the German Bundestag. 1949–2002] (in German). München: De Gruyter - De Gruyter Saur. p. 1715. ISBN 978-3-11-184511-1.
