= Carl Wirths =

German politician (1897–1955)

Carl Wirths (December 10, 1897 – June 16, 1955 in Wuppertal) was a German politician of the Free Democratic Party (FDP). He was a representative of the Landtag of North Rhine-Westphalia from October 2, 1946 until September 1, 1949 and the national Bundestag from 1949 until his death.

== Life and career ==
Wirths was born in 1897 in Elberfeld, today a suburb of Wuppertal. After attending elementary school and high school he completed an apprenticeship in construction. He along with his father in 1924, he founded the construction company "Carl Wirth & Co.", which existed until its dissolution in May 2004.

Wirths was also the publisher of the Westdeutsche Rundschau, a newspaper close to the FDP in North Rhine-Westphalia.

Wirths joined the Free Democratic Party after its formation in 1946 and represented the Landtag of North Rhine-Westphalia from October 2, 1946 until September 1, 1949. From 1945 he was a member of the Advisory Board of the City of Wuppertal and was from 1946 to 1951 and 1952 to 1955 a city councilor there.

In the 1949 general elections, Wirths was elected to the Bundestag to which he belonged until his death in 1955, elected successively in 1949 and 1953. From 1949 to 1953 and 9 November 1954 until his death he was Deputy. Chairman of the Parliamentary Committee for Construction and Land Law and of 9 February 1950 until his death, served as. Chairman of the Parliamentary Committee for Reconstruction and Housing Agency.

== Publications ==
- Carl Wirths, Hermann Weitnauer: Das Wohnungseigentumsgesetz, 1. Auflage 1952, Vahlen Verlag. (erscheint derzeit in 9. Auflage unter dem Titel "Weitnauer. Wohnungseigentumsrecht")

== Literature ==
- Friedrich Henning, Carl Wirths und das Wohnungseigentumsgesetz von 1951, in: Geschichte im Westen, Band 9, 1994, Seiten 183 bis 196.
