= Eduard Orth =

German politician (1902–1968)

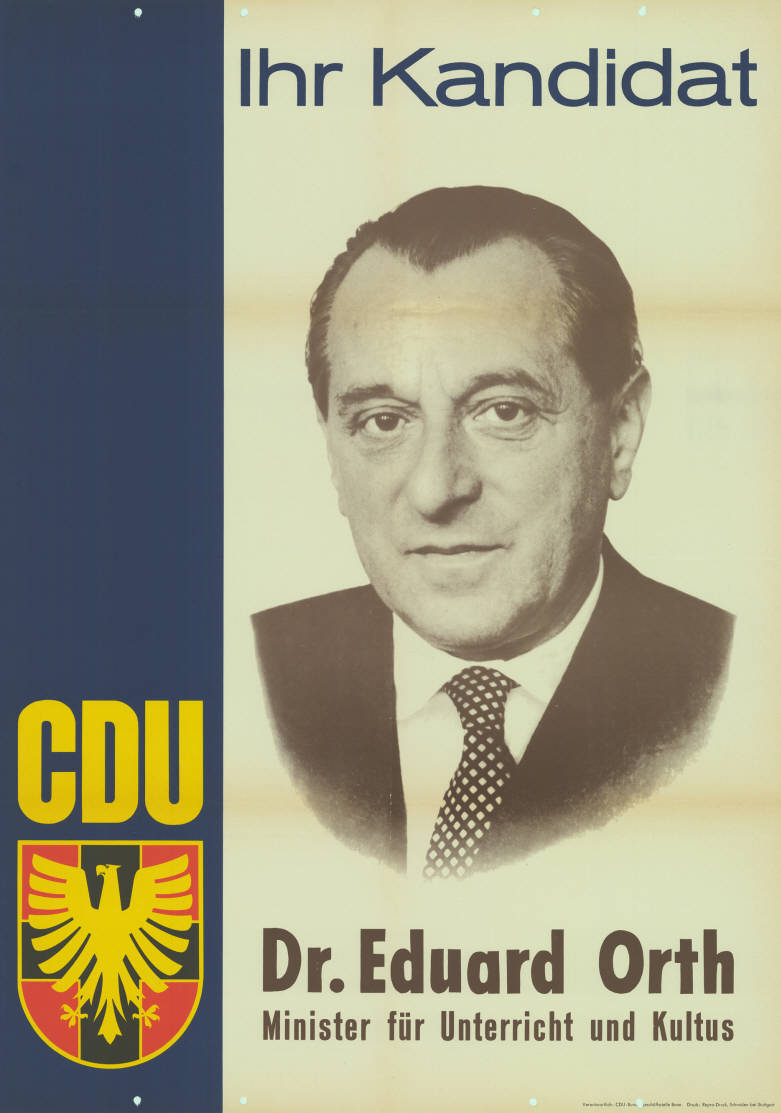
- CDU candidate poster for the state election in Rhineland-Palatinate 1963

Member of the Bundestag
- In office 7 September 1949 – 7 October 1956

Personal details
- Born: 13 October 1902 Germersheim
- Died: 31 March 1968 (aged 65) Mainz
- Party: CDU

Eduard Orth (October 13, 1902 &ndash in Germersheim; March 31, 1968 in Mainz) was a German politician of the Christian Democratic Union (CDU) and former member of the German Bundestag.

== Life ==
In the first Bundestag election in 1949, he came to the German Bundestag by winning a direct mandate in the Speyer constituency and was re-elected in 1953. After his appointment as Minister of Education of Rhineland-Palatinate, he resigned from the Bundestag on October 7, 1956. From 1959 until his death he was a member of the Rhineland-Palatinate state parliament.

== Literature ==
Herbst, Ludolf; Jahn, Bruno (2002). Vierhaus, Rudolf (ed.). Biographisches Handbuch der Mitglieder des Deutschen Bundestages. 1949–2002 [Biographical Handbook of the Members of the German Bundestag. 1949–2002] (in German). München: De Gruyter - De Gruyter Saur. p. 1715. ISBN 978-3-11-184511-1.
