= Josef Grunner =

German politician (1904–1984)

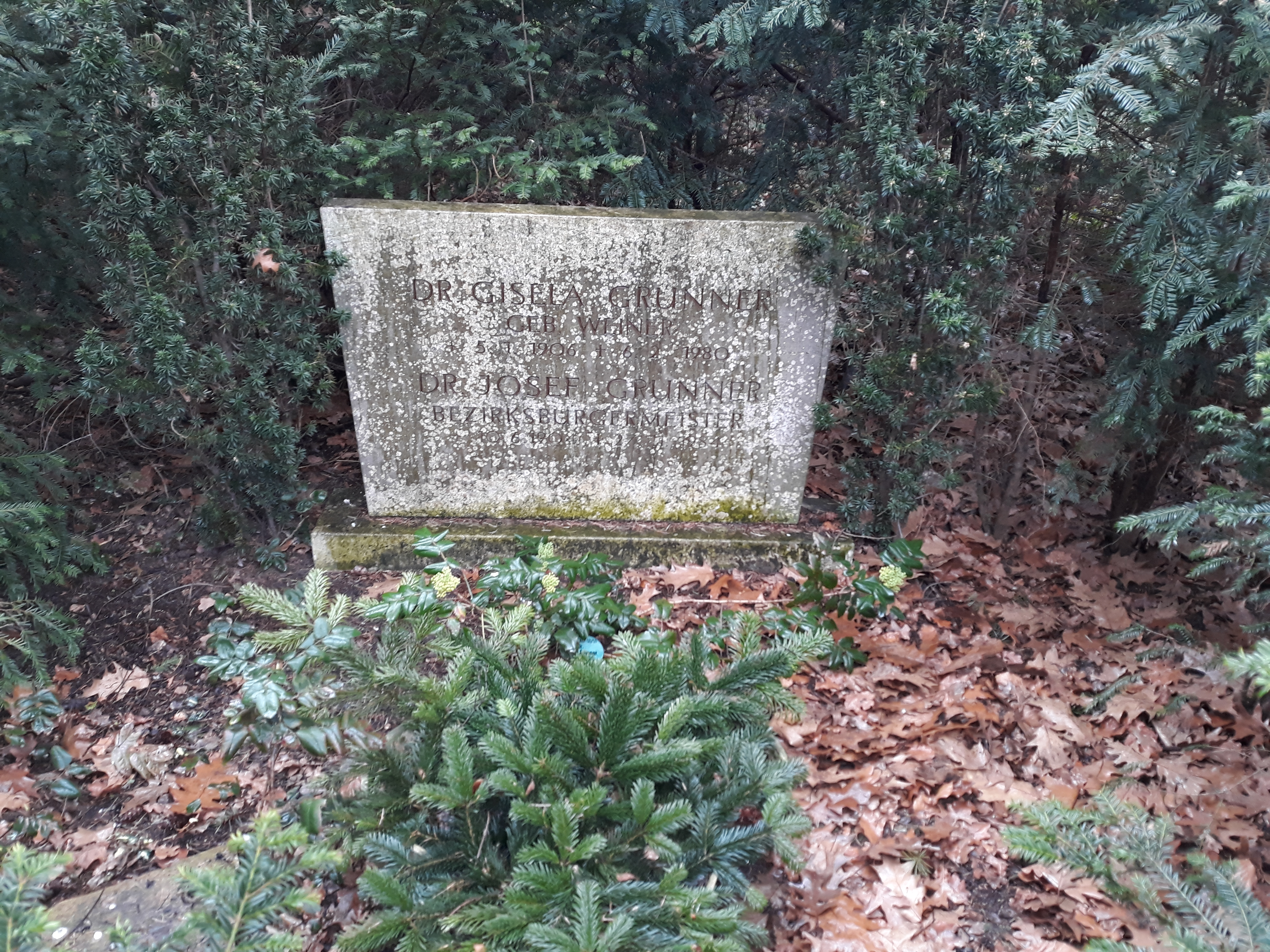
- The grave of Grunner and his wife Gisela in Berlin

Member of the Bundestag
- In office 11 June 1957 – 21 June 1957

Personal details
- Born: 10 June 1904 Atzelsdorf
- Died: 27 November 1984 (aged 80)
- Party: SPD

Josef Grunner (10 June 1904 – 27 November 1984) was a German politician of the Social Democratic Party (SPD) and member of the German Bundestag.

== Life ==
As a Berlin member of parliament, Grunner was a member of the German Bundestag from 11 June 1957, when he succeeded the late Louise Schroeder, until his resignation on 21 June 1957.

== Literature ==
Herbst, Ludolf; Jahn, Bruno (2002). Vierhaus, Rudolf (ed.). Biographisches Handbuch der Mitglieder des Deutschen Bundestages. 1949–2002 [Biographical Handbook of the Members of the German Bundestag. 1949–2002] (in German). München: De Gruyter - De Gruyter Saur. p. 1715. ISBN 978-3-11-184511-1.
