= Valentin Brück =

German politician (1911–1980)

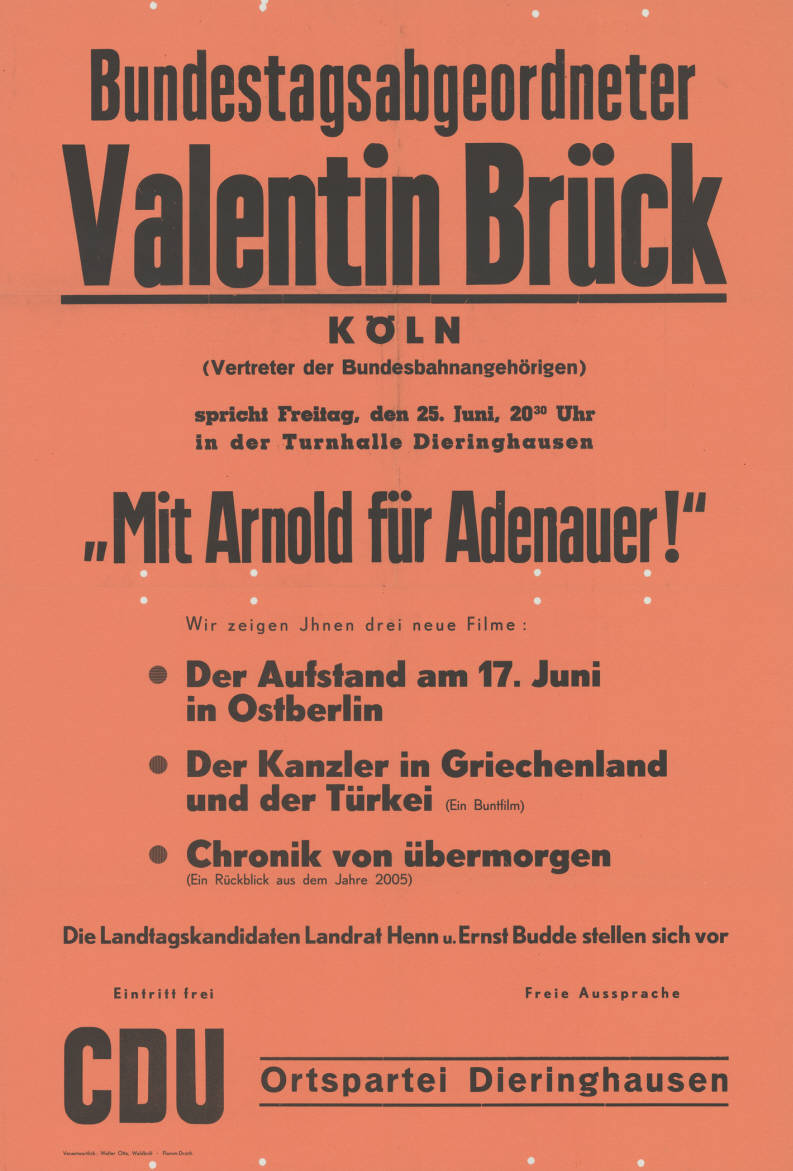
- A poster of the CDU Dieringhausen for the state election in North Rhine-Westphalia 1954

Member of the Bundestag
- In office 6 October 1953 – 19 October 1969
- In office 14 August 1970 – 22 September 1972

Personal details
- Born: 23 April 1911 Zweifelscheid
- Died: 20 July 1980 (aged 69) Jünkerath, Rhineland-Palatinate, Germany
- Party: CDU

Valentin Brück (April 23, 1911 – July 20, 1980) was a German politician of the Christian Democratic Union (CDU) and former member of the German Bundestag.

== Life ==
In 1949 he joined the CDU and became secretary in the district association of Cologne-Ehrenfeld-North. In 1950, he became managing director, later chairman, of the CDU Rhineland Regional Civil Servants Committee and member of the CDU Federal Committee for Public Administration.

Brück was a member of the German Bundestag from 1953 to 1969 and again from 14 August 1970 to 1972.

== Literature ==
Herbst, Ludolf; Jahn, Bruno (2002). Vierhaus, Rudolf (ed.). Biographisches Handbuch der Mitglieder des Deutschen Bundestages. 1949–2002 [Biographical Handbook of the Members of the German Bundestag. 1949–2002] (in German). München: De Gruyter - De Gruyter Saur. p. 1715. ISBN 978-3-11-184511-1.
