= Otto Lenz =

German politician

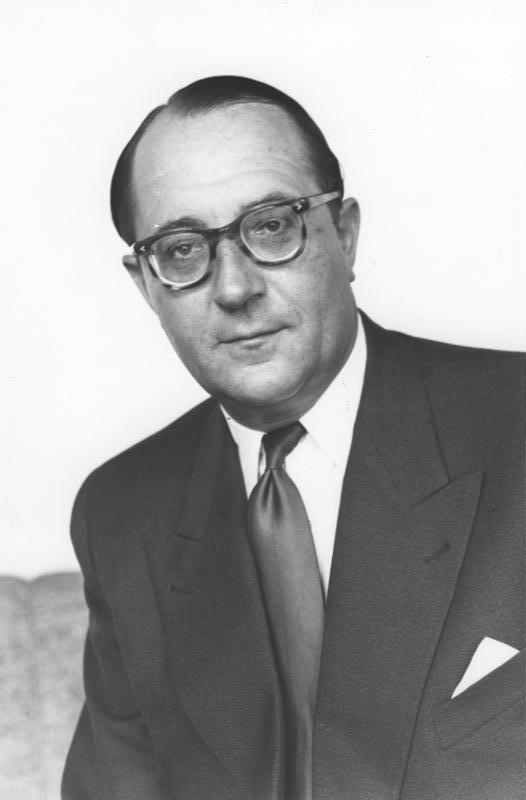
Otto Lenz (1951)

Otto Lenz (6 July 1903, Wetzlar, Rhine Province – 2 May 1957, Naples) was a German politician (CDU), serving from 1951 to 1953 as Head of the Chancellery, and from 1953 until his death as a member of the German Bundestag. He was also a signatory of the founding declaration of the CDU.

== Early life and legal career ==
After completing his Abitur, Lenz began studying law at the University of Freiburg. He completed his studies at the University of Marburg in 1924, receiving his doctorate in 1925 with a dissertation entitled Die Haftung bei Gattungsschulden in § 279 BGB (The Liability of Generic Debt in § 279 BGB). After passing the Staatsexamen, Lenz joined the Administration of Justice and quickly began working in Germany's Federal Ministry of Justice. He became director of the Ministry's press office in 1929 and served in this office for four years, during which he experienced considerable success in developing a strong relationship with the German press. In 1932 he began working as the personal advisor of state secretary Heinrich Hölscher.

=== Nazi-Era ===
After the Machtergreifung in January 1933, Lenz's title was changed to Advisor of Commercial Law in the Reichsjustizamt. One year later, in April 1934, he was promoted to the position of Landgerichtsdirektor despite the protest of the National Socialist lawyer's association. His first act of defiance to the Nazi-Regime occurred in 1938, when he refused a job transfer due to his unwillingness to work as a judge in the Nazi legal system. He worked instead as a lawyer during this time, being admitted only with serious difficulty to the Kammergericht.

As an opponent of the Nazis, Lenz belonged to the Donnerstagsgesellschaft (Thursday Association), a circle of former Centre Party members, officials, and journalists. He participated in the opposition by at one point hiding resistance fighter Ernst von Harnack in his apartment, as well as maintaining contact with 20 July plot-conspirators Josef Wirmer and Carl Goerdeler. As a result of these relationships Lenz was arrested after the failed assassination plot and brought to court in January 1945 for his participation in the conspiracy as well as the suspicious nature of his work as a lawyer throughout the early 1940s, during which time he was seen by the Gestapo as a defender of Jews. His role as the defendant of the pardoned opposition leader Josef Müller in 1944 was a further source of irritation to the Nazis. Due to his success as his own defence lawyer, Lenz was able to avoid execution and was sentenced instead to four years penitentiary with eight years without civil rights. He was freed by Soviet forces on 28 April 1945.

== Politics ==
Immediately after his release from prison Lenz took part in the establishment of the CDU in Berlin. His desire for an interdenominational political party held together by common Christian beliefs preceded the conclusion of the war and is present in journal entries from his time in prison.

Lenz's longing to become a lawyer in Munich caused him to hesitate in accepting Konrad Adenauer's 1946 offer to become Secretary of State, which he ultimately accepted and began serving as on 15 January 1951. During this time Lenz remained extremely busy meeting with politicians, diplomats, church representatives, businessmen, lobbyists, and journalists as well as helping establish the direction in which the young Federal Republic of Germany would take itself.

His desire to create a "Ministry of Information" after the 1953 elections (in which he was elected to the Bundestag) ultimately failed due to the strong legacy of the Propagandaministerium of the Nazi-Era. His desire to be voice in the public sphere led to the establishment of Die Politische Meinung, a monthly publication which continues to be distributed by the Konrad-Adenauer-Stiftung today.

On 2 May 1957, while still a member of the Bundestag, Lenz died unexpectedly in Naples after developing a fever on a return trip from Africa.
