= Paul Luchtenberg =

German politician (1890–1973)

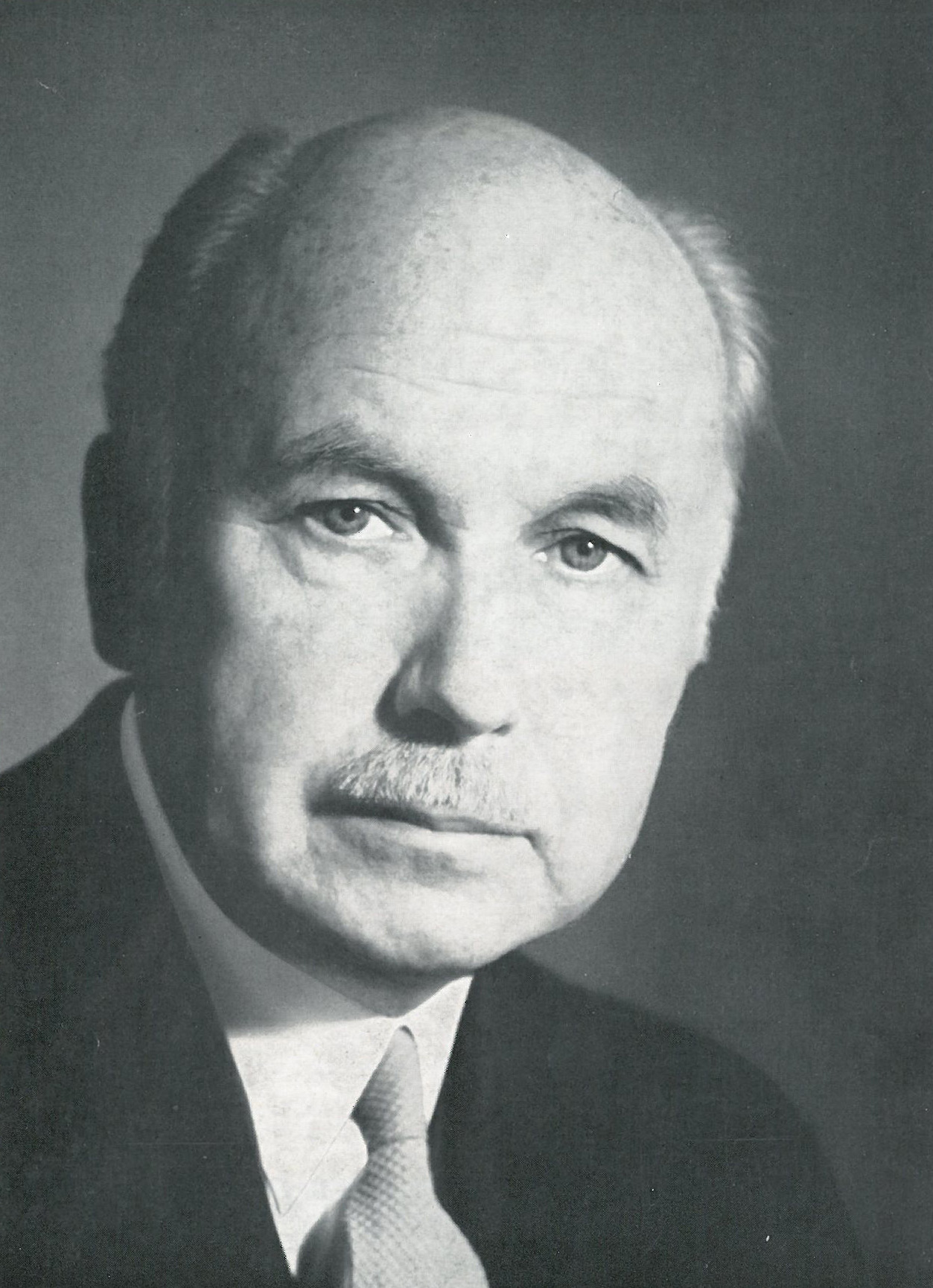
Paul Luchtenberg

Paul Luchtenberg (1890–1973) was a German cultural scientist, educator and politician for the Free Democratic Party, as well as Culture Minister for North Rhine-Westphalia.

== Career ==
Paul Luchtenberg was born 3 June 1890 in Burscheid and attended school in Gummersbach. He graduated in 1912 and went on to study philosophy and education at the University of Bonn and the University of Münster. During his studies he was a member of AMV Makaria Bonn, a student music society. After completing a PhD in Philosophy under Erich Becher, he began a probation year, teaching in a grammar school. He went on to teach in Remscheid until 1923. In addition, he qualified to be a professor at the University of Cologne in 1920, where he was a student of Max Scheler, whose material value-ethics he wanted to apply in his teaching. He assumed his first professorship in 1923 at the College of Economics and Political Science in Detmold. Between 1925 and 1931, he was initially an associate professor, and later a full professor, of education, philosophy, and psychology at the Technical University of Darmstadt. From 1931 he was an associate professor of the same subjects at the Technical University of Dresden, where he also led the Pedagogical Institute for Teacher Training.

By 1933, he was already a target for attacks by the National Socialist German Students’ League due to being a democrat. In 1936, he was dismissed, (later than many others including Victor Klemperer and Richard Seyfert) in implementation of the Law for the Restoration of the Professional Civil Service, after long being protected by the Culture Minister for Saxony, Wilhelm Hartnecke.

He died 7 April 1973 in Burscheid.

== Politics ==
Until 1945, Luchtenberg did not belong to any party. After the war, he was a co-founder of the FDP North Rhine-Westphalia. In addition, he was a member of the FDP federal executive committee from 1951 to 1958. Luchtenberg was a member of the German Bundestag from October 30, 1950, when he succeeded Friedrich Middelhauve as FDP state chairman, until the end of the first legislative period. He was a member of the Bundestag again from September 18, 1954, when he succeeded Willi Weyer as Interior Minister of North Rhine-Westphalia, until April 9, 1956. In 1956, the FDP switched coalition partners from the CDU to the SPD, which, at the federal level, led to the "ministerial wing" splitting from the party and founding the Free People's Party (FVP). After this, Luchtenberg served as Minister of Culture from February 28, 1956, to July 1958. As state minister of culture, Luchtenberg advocated the creation of a "Federal Ministry of Culture" in order to break up the very denominational cultural policy of the states of Bavaria and Rhineland-Palatinate in particular. Thus the Minister of Culture of Rhineland-Palatinate, Adolf Süsterhenn, was one of the harshest critics of these plans, while the Minister of Hesse, Arno Hennig, supported them.

== Charity work ==
Luchtenberg was president of the Friedrich Naumann Foundation from 1961 up to 1970, after being vice president since 1958. From 1970 until his day of death, Luchtenberg was an honorary chairman of the foundation. In 1962, he founded the Paul Luchtenberg Foundation to support the culture of his hometown Burscheid. The House of Art in Burscheid is another example of his charity work. Documents about Luchtenberg's work for the Friedrich Naumann Foundation can be found in the Archive of Liberalism in Gummersbach.

== Honours ==
- Honorary citizen of Burscheid
- 1965 Grand Cross with Star and Sash of the Order of Merit of the Federal Republic of Germany
- 1967 Gold medal of the Humboldt-Society
- 1968 Wolfgang-Döring medal
- 1970 Honorary Senator of the RWTH Aachen University

== Publications ==
- Antinomien der Pädagogik, Langensalza 1923.
- Kants Lehre, Detmold 1924.
- Burscheid – Zeugnisse seiner Vergangenheit 1175–1815, Leverkusen 1941.
- Beiträge zur Frage der „Ungelernten“, Bielefeld 1955.
- Schloß Burg an der Wupper, Ratingen 1957.
- Wolfgang Müller von Königswinter, 2 Bände, Cologne 1959.
- Wandlung und Auftrag liberaler Kulturpolitik, Bonn 1960.
- Künstlerisches Gerät und Waffen des Spätmittelalters, Schloß Burg 1960.
- Gegenwartsaufgaben der Erwachsenenbildung. Festschrift zum 70. Geburtstag von Richard Freudenberg, co-written with Walter Erbe, Cologne 1962.
- Der Bildhauer Ernst Kunst. Versuch einer Deutung seines Schaffens, Durach 1962.
- Johannes Löh und die Aufklärung im Bergischen, Cologne 1965.
- Geschichte des deutschen Liberalismus, Cologne 1966.
- Walter Wohlfeld. Unterwegs vom Gegenstand zum Wesensgrund, Durach 1967.
- Das Wagnis der Mündigkeit. Beiträge zum Selbstverständnis des Liberalismus, Neustadt/Aisch 1970.

== Literature ==
- Cultural policy and idea of man. Commemorative publication for Paul Luchtenberg, Neustadt/Aisch 1965.
- Christian Tilitzki, German university philosophy in the Weimar Republic and the Third Reich. Academy Publishing House, Berlin 2002, ISBN 3-05-003647-8.
