= Hans Blöcker =

German politician (1898–1988)

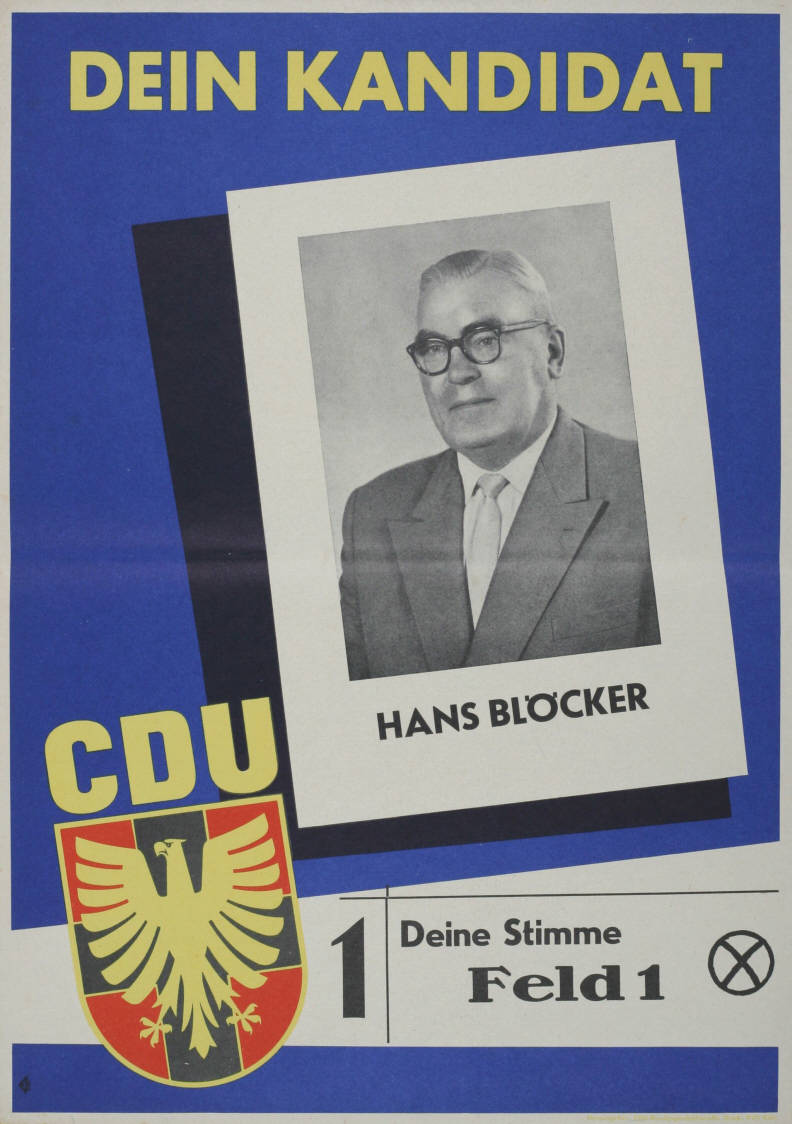
- Election poster (1957)

Member of the Bundestag
- In office 8 November 1954 – 19 October 1969

Personal details
- Born: 17 April 1898 Neumünster
- Died: 15 June 1988 (aged 90) Neumünster, Schleswig-Holstein, Germany
- Party: CDU
- Children: 6

Hans Blöcker (April 17, 1898 – June 15, 1988) was a German politician of the Christian Democratic Union (CDU) and former member of the German Bundestag.

== Life ==
Blöcker, who joined the CDU in 1953, was a member of the state parliament in Schleswig-Holstein from 1954 to 31 December 1957, where he represented the Neumünster constituency. On November 8, 1954, he succeeded Kai-Uwe von Hassel, who had been elected Prime Minister of Schleswig-Holstein, in the German Bundestag, of which he was a member until 1969. In 1954 and 1965 he entered the Bundestag via the Schleswig-Holstein state list and otherwise as a directly elected member of parliament for the Segeberg - Neumünster constituency.

== Literature ==
Herbst, Ludolf; Jahn, Bruno (2002). Vierhaus, Rudolf (ed.). Biographisches Handbuch der Mitglieder des Deutschen Bundestages. 1949–2002 [Biographical Handbook of the Members of the German Bundestag. 1949–2002] (in German). München: De Gruyter - De Gruyter Saur. p. 1715. ISBN 978-3-11-184511-1.
