= Ernst Albrecht (politician, born 1914) =

German politician

Member of the Bundestag
- In office 11 May 1956 – 6 October 1957

Personal details
- Born: 28 July 1914 Greifswald
- Died: 1 December 1991 (aged 77) Schleswig, Schleswig-Holstein, Germany
- Party: CDU

Ernst Albrecht (28 July 1914 – 1 December 1991) was a German politician of the Christian Democratic Union (CDU), and former member of the German Bundestag.

== Life ==
From 1949 to 1954, Albrecht (who had joined the CDU in 1946), was a member of the Altona District Assembly. From 1953 to 1 November 1956 and from 1957 to 1961, he was a member of the Hamburg City Council. He was a member of the German Bundestag from 11 May 1956, when he succeeded Karlfranz Schmidt-Wittmack until the end of the second legislative period.

== Literature ==
Herbst, Ludolf; Jahn, Bruno (2002). Vierhaus, Rudolf (ed.). Biographisches Handbuch der Mitglieder des Deutschen Bundestages. 1949–2002 [Biographical Handbook of the Members of the German Bundestag. 1949–2002] (in German). München: De Gruyter - De Gruyter Saur. p. 1715. ISBN 978-3-11-184511-1.
