= List of members of the 3rd Bundestag =

3rd Bundestag
←	2nd	4th	→

Overview
- Legislative body: Bundestag
- Meeting place: 3: Kongresshalle (Berlin-Tiergarten); Bundeshaus (Bonn); Big lecture hall of the Physics Institute of Technische Universität Berlin
- Term: October 15, 1957 – October 15, 1961
- Election: 1957 West German federal election
- Government: Third Adenauer cabinet
- Members: 519
- President of the Bundestag: Eugen Gerstenmaier

The 3rd German Bundestag, the lower house of parliament of the Federal Republic of Germany, was elected on 15 September 1957, and existed from 15 October 1957 to 15 October 1961. It held a total of 168 parliamentary sittings; the last sitting was on 22 August 1961.

On 22 October 1957 the Bundestag elected Konrad Adenauer as federal chancellor of the Federal Republic of Germany on the fourth ballot, with 274 (+8) (Note: During the existence of West Germany the Abgeordnetenhaus of Berlin elected representatives to the Bundestag for West Berlin. But since they were prohibited by an international treaty to participate in Germanys legislative process, their votes were trivial.) yes votes, 193 (+13) no votes and nine abstentions.

== Presidium of the Bundestag ==
Marie-Elisabeth Lüders (FDP) served as Alterspräsidentin (Mother of the House), after Konrad Adenauer (CDU) who should have had this role, had rejected it, because he considered it inappropriate for the incumbent federal chancellor to serve as Alterspräsident. She presided over the first session of the 3rd Bundestag until Eugen Gerstenmaier was elected President of the Bundestag.

Carlo Schmid (SPD), Richard Jeager (CSU) and Max Becker (FDP) were elected as vice presidents of the Bundestag. They were elected almost unanimously, with only two abstentions.

Eugen Gerstenmaier was elected President of the Bundestag on the first ballot with 437 votes in favor, 54 abstentions and 3 invalid votes.

== Composition of the Bundestag ==

The CDU/CSU (Christian Democratic Union of Germany/Christian Social Union in Bavaria) party gained the first — and to date, only — absolute majority for a single German parliamentary group in a free election. However the CDU/CDU still formed a coalition with the German Party (DP) until 1960 when nine of their 17 Bundestag members left the DP and joined the CDU. After that, the DP left the governing coalition. (Hans-Joachim von Merkatz, the Federal Minister of the Bundesrat and State Affairs, and Hans-Christoph Seebohm, the Federal Ministry for Transport, the DP members in the governing cabinet, had left in July 1960 and joined the CDU in September 1960.) The SPD won new seats as well. The FDP was the only party in the election that lost seats.

== Changes ==
Changes in the numbers of the four caucuses (CDU/CSU, SPD, FDP, German Party)
Date	Reason for change	CDU/CSU	SPD	FDP	DP	Others	Total number
1961	First meeting	277	181	43	17	1	519
9 October 1957	Karl Hübner becomes a guest member of the CDU/CSU caucus	278	181	43	17		519
3 June 1958	Otto Eisenmann leaves the DP caucus and joins the FDP caucus	278	181	44	16		519
20 June 1958	Alexander Elbrächter leaves the DP caucus and becomes unaffiliated	278	181	44	15	1	519
24 June 1958	Alexander Elbrächter joins the CDU/CSU caucus	279	181	44	15		519
1 July 1960	Georg Ripken, Heinrich Schild, Hans-Christoph Seebohm, Willy Steinmetz, Margot Kalinke, Hans-Joachim von Merkatz, Ludwig Preiß, Victor-Emanuel Preusker, Wilhelm Probst leave the DP caucus and become unaffiliated	279	181	44	6	9	519
20 September 1960	The same nine former DP members join the CDU/CSU caucus	288	181	44	6		519
8 November 1960	Peter Nellen leaves the CDU/CSU caucus and joins the SPD caucus	287	182	44	6		519
24 February 1961	Arno Behrisch leaves the SPD caucus and becomes unaffiliated	287	181	44	6	1	519
25 April 1961	Fritz Logemann leaves the DP caucus and joins the FDP caucus	287	181	45	5	1	519
3 May 1961	Herbert Schneider, Helmuth Schranz, Heinz Matthes leave the DP caucus and become unaffiliated	287	181	45	2	4	519
3 May 1961	Peter Tobaben, Ludwig Schneider leave the DP caucus and join the CDU/CSU caucus	289	181	45		4	519
18 August 1961	Georg Richard Kinat leaves the SPD caucus and becomes unaffiliated	289	180	45		5	519

== Members ==
This is a list of members of the 3rd Bundestag, whose members were in office from 1957 until 1961:

State	No.	Constituency	Member	Party
Schleswig-Holstein	1	Husum – Südtondern – Eiderstedt	Christian Giencke	CDU
Schleswig-Holstein	2	Flensburg	Will Rasner	CDU
Schleswig-Holstein	3	Schleswig – Eckernförde	Gerhard Stoltenberg	CDU
Schleswig-Holstein	4	Norder- und Süderdithmarschen	Hermann Glüsing	CDU
Schleswig-Holstein	5	Rendsburg	Detlef Struve	CDU
Schleswig-Holstein	6	Kiel	Hans-Carl Rüdel	CDU
Schleswig-Holstein	7	Plön – Eutin/Nord	Heinrich Gerns	CDU
Schleswig-Holstein	8	Oldenburg – Eutin/Süd	Friedrich-Karl Storm	CDU
Schleswig-Holstein	9	Lübeck	Helmut Wendelborn	CDU
Schleswig-Holstein	10	Segeberg – Neumünster	Hans Blöcker	CDU
Schleswig-Holstein	11	Steinburg	Ernst Engelbrecht-Greve	CDU
Schleswig-Holstein	12	Pinneberg	Wilhelm Goldhagen	CDU
Schleswig-Holstein	13	Stormarn	Werner Schwarz	CDU
Schleswig-Holstein	14	Herzogtum Lauenburg	Otto Christian Archibald von Bismarck	CDU
Schleswig-Holstein	List		Fritz Baade	SPD
Schleswig-Holstein	List		Bruno Diekmann	SPD
Schleswig-Holstein	List		Wilhelm Gülich (Note: Wilhelm Gülich died on 15 April 1960.)	SPD
Schleswig-Holstein	List		Kurt Pohle	SPD
Schleswig-Holstein	List		Karl Regling	SPD
Schleswig-Holstein	List		Reinhold Rehs	SPD
Schleswig-Holstein	List		Annemarie Renger	SPD
Schleswig-Holstein	List		Richard Tamblé (Note: Richard Tamblé took office on 25 April 1960, to succeed Wilhelm Gülich.)	SPD
Schleswig-Holstein	List		Otto Köhler (Note: Otto Köhler died on 27 June 1960.)	FDP
Schleswig-Holstein	List		Wolfgang Imle (Note: Wolfgang Imle took office on 29 June 1960, to succeed Otto Köhler.)	FDP
Schleswig-Holstein	List		Otto Eisenmann	DP
Hamburg	15	Hamburg I	Hellmut Kalbitzer	SPD
Hamburg	16	Hamburg II	Karl Wilhelm Berkhan	SPD
Hamburg	17	Hamburg III	Peter Blachstein	SPD
Hamburg	18	Hamburg IV	Georg Schneider	CDU
Hamburg	19	Hamburg V	Irma Keilhack	SPD
Hamburg	20	Hamburg VI	Nikolaus Jürgensen	SPD
Hamburg	21	Hamburg VII	Herbert Wehner	SPD
Hamburg	22	Hamburg VIII	Helmut Schmidt	SPD
Hamburg	List		Irma Blohm	CDU
Hamburg	List		Gerd Bucerius	CDU
Hamburg	List		Heinrich Gewandt	CDU
Hamburg	List		Paul Leverkuehn (Note: Paul Leverkuehn died on 1 March 1960.)	CDU
Hamburg	List		Hugo Scharnberg	CDU
Hamburg	List		Roland Seffrin	CDU
Hamburg	List		Dietrich Rollmann (Note: Dietrich Rollmann took office on 7 March 1960, to succeed Paul Leverkuehn.)	CDU
Hamburg	List		Julius Brecht	SPD
Hamburg	List		Karl Meitmann	SPD
Hamburg	List		Rolf Dahlgrün	FDP
Hamburg	List		Willy Max Rademacher	FDP
Hamburg	List		Hans-Christoph Seebohm	DP
Lower Saxony	23	Aurich – Emden	Georg Peters	SPD
Lower Saxony	24	Leer	Hermann Conring	CDU
Lower Saxony	25	Wilhelmshaven – Friesland	Hellmuth Heye	CDU
Lower Saxony	26	Emsland	Josef Stecker	CDU
Lower Saxony	27	Bersenbrück – Lingen	Clemens Hesemann	CDU
Lower Saxony	28	Osnabrück-Stadt und -Land	Anton Storch	CDU
Lower Saxony	29	Delmenhorst – Wesermarsch	J. Hermann Siemer	CDU
Lower Saxony	30	Oldenburg – Ammerland	Wilhelm Nieberg	CDU
Lower Saxony	31	Vechta – Cloppenburg	Kurt Schmücker	CDU
Lower Saxony	32	Cuxhaven – Hadeln – Wesermünde	Hans Hermsdorf	SPD
Lower Saxony	33	Stade – Bremervörde	Peter Tobaben	DP
Lower Saxony	34	Verden – Rotenburg – Osterholz	Hans-Joachim von Merkatz	DP
Lower Saxony	35	Lüneburg – Dannenberg	Lambert Huys	CDU
Lower Saxony	36	Harburg – Soltau	Ernst Pernoll	CDU
Lower Saxony	37	Fallingbostel – Hoya	Heinz Matthes	DP
Lower Saxony	38	Celle	Margot Kalinke	DP
Lower Saxony	39	Uelzen	Walter Pflaumbaum	CDU
Lower Saxony	40	Stadt Hannover-Nord	Adolf Cillien (Note: Adolf Cillien died on 29 April 1960.)	CDU
Lower Saxony	41	Stadt Hannover-Süd	Erich Ollenhauer	SPD
Lower Saxony	42	Hannover-Land	Hans Jahn (Note: Hans Jahn died on 10 July 1960.)	SPD
Lower Saxony	43	Neustadt – Grafschaft Schaumburg	Ernst Weltner	SPD
Lower Saxony	44	Nienburg – Schaumburg-Lippe	Otto Heinrich Greve	SPD
Lower Saxony	45	Diepholz – Melle – Wittlage	Karl Gossel	CDU
Lower Saxony	46	Hameln – Springe	Heinz Frehsee	SPD
Lower Saxony	47	Alfeld – Holzminden	Elinor Hubert	SPD
Lower Saxony	48	Hildesheim-Stadt und -Land	Theodor Oberländer	CDU
Lower Saxony	49	Gandersheim – Salzgitter	Wilhelm Höck	CDU
Lower Saxony	50	Stadt Braunschweig	Hermann Koch	CDU
Lower Saxony	51	Braunschweig-Land – Helmstedt	Alfred Burgemeister	CDU
Lower Saxony	52	Wolfenbüttel – Goslar-Land	Carl Pietscher	CDU
Lower Saxony	53	Harz	Heinrich Lindenberg	CDU
Lower Saxony	54	Peine – Gifhorn	Arthur Enk	CDU
Lower Saxony	55	Northeim – Einbeck – Duderstadt	Karl Hackethal	CDU
Lower Saxony	56	Göttingen-Münden	Franz Blücher (Note: Franz Blücher resigned on 28 February 1958.)	DP
Lower Saxony	List		Franziska Bennemann	SPD
Lower Saxony	List		Johann Cramer	SPD
Lower Saxony	List		Egon Franke	SPD
Lower Saxony	List		Günter Frede	SPD
Lower Saxony	List		Walter Harm (Note: Walter Harm resigned on 22 September 1961.)	SPD
Lower Saxony	List		Gustav Heinemann	SPD
Lower Saxony	List		Hans-Jürgen Junghans	SPD
Lower Saxony	List		Lisa Korspeter	SPD
Lower Saxony	List		Johannes Lücke	SPD
Lower Saxony	List		Moritz-Ernst Priebe	SPD
Lower Saxony	List		Helmut Rohde	SPD
Lower Saxony	List		Heinrich-Wilhelm Ruhnke	SPD
Lower Saxony	List		Martin Schmidt	SPD
Lower Saxony	List		Kurt Schröder	SPD
Lower Saxony	List		Ernst Rodiek (Note: Ernst Rodiek took office on 15 July 1960, to succeed Hans Jahn.)	SPD
Lower Saxony	List		Alfred Schliestedt (Note: Alfred Schliestedt took office on 29 September 1961, to succeed Walter Harm.)	SPD
Lower Saxony	List		Wilhelm Brese	CDU
Lower Saxony	List		Else Brökelschen	CDU
Lower Saxony	List		Pascual Jordan	CDU
Lower Saxony	List		Ernst Kuntscher	CDU
Lower Saxony	List		Fritz Mensing	CDU
Lower Saxony	List		Franz Varelmann	CDU
Lower Saxony	List		Rudolf Werner (Note: Rudolf Werner took office on 24 July 1959, to succeed Ernst Pernoll.)	CDU
Lower Saxony	List		Elisabeth Vietje (Note: Elisabeth Vietje took office on 6 May 1960, to succeed Adolf Cillien.)	CDU
Lower Saxony	List		Jan Eilers	FDP
Lower Saxony	List		Carlo Graaff (Note: Carlo Graaff resigned on 8 May 1959.)	FDP
Lower Saxony	List		Reinhold Kreitmeyer	FDP
Lower Saxony	List		Heinrich Sander	FDP
Lower Saxony	List		Herwart Miessner (Note: Herwart Miessner took office on 21 May 1959, to succeed Carlo Graaff.)	FDP
Lower Saxony	List		Franz Blücher (Note: Franz Blücher resigned on 28 February 1958.)	DP
Lower Saxony	List		Alexander Elbrächter	DP
Lower Saxony	List		Fritz Logemann	DP
Lower Saxony	List		Willy Steinmetz	DP
Lower Saxony	List		Georg Ripken (Note: Georg Ripken took office on 10 March 1958, to succeed Franz Blücher.)	DP
Bremen	57	Bremen-Ost	Hermann Hansing	SPD
Bremen	58	Bremen-West	Siegfried Bärsch	SPD
Bremen	59	Bremerhaven – Bremen-Nord	Philipp Wehr (Note: Philipp Wehr died on 20 February 1960.)	SPD
Bremen	List		Karl Krammig	CDU
Bremen	List		Ernst Müller-Hermann	CDU
Bremen	List		Herbert Schneider	DP
Bremen	List		Emil Theil (Note: Emil Theil took office on 6 March 1960, to succeed Philipp Wehr.)	SPD
North Rhine-Westphalia	60	Aachen-Stadt	Franz Meyers (Note: Franz Meyers resigned on 4 September 1958.)	CDU
North Rhine-Westphalia	61	Aachen-Land	Franz Mühlenberg	CDU
North Rhine-Westphalia	62	Geilenkirchen – Erkelenz – Jülich	Karl Arnold (Note: Karl Arnold died on 29 June 1958.)	CDU
North Rhine-Westphalia	63	Düren – Monschau – Schleiden	Bernhard Günther	CDU
North Rhine-Westphalia	64	Bergheim (Erft) – Euskirchen	Johannes Even	CDU
North Rhine-Westphalia	65	Köln-Land	Aloys Lenz	CDU
North Rhine-Westphalia	66	Cologne I	Aenne Brauksiepe	CDU
North Rhine-Westphalia	67	Cologne II	Fritz Hellwig (Note: Fritz Hellwig resigned on 30 November 1959.)	CDU
North Rhine-Westphalia	68	Cologne III	Hans Katzer	CDU
North Rhine-Westphalia	69	Bonn-Stadt und -Land	Konrad Adenauer	CDU
North Rhine-Westphalia	70	Siegkreis	Peter Etzenbach	CDU
North Rhine-Westphalia	71	Oberbergischer Kreis	August Dresbach	CDU
North Rhine-Westphalia	72	Rheinisch-Bergischer Kreis	Paul Lücke	CDU
North Rhine-Westphalia	73	Rhein-Wupper-Kreis – Leverkusen	Peter Wilhelm Brand	CDU
North Rhine-Westphalia	74	Remscheid – Solingen	Franz Etzel	CDU
North Rhine-Westphalia	75	Wuppertal I	Otto Schmidt	CDU
North Rhine-Westphalia	76	Wuppertal II	Eugen Huth	CDU
North Rhine-Westphalia	77	Düsseldorf-Mettmann	Gerhard Schröder	CDU
North Rhine-Westphalia	78	Düsseldorf I	Josef Gockeln (Note: Josef Gockeln died on 6 December 1958.)	CDU
North Rhine-Westphalia	79	Düsseldorf II	Johannes Caspers	CDU
North Rhine-Westphalia	80	Neuss – Grevenbroich	Richard Muckermann	CDU
North Rhine-Westphalia	81	Krefeld	Günther Serres	CDU
North Rhine-Westphalia	82	Rheydt – M. Gladbach – Viersen	Joseph Illerhaus	CDU
North Rhine-Westphalia	83	Kempen-Krefeld	Matthias Hoogen	CDU
North Rhine-Westphalia	84	Moers	Ernst Holla	CDU
North Rhine-Westphalia	85	Geldern – Kleve	Emil Solke	CDU
North Rhine-Westphalia	86	Rees – Dinslaken	Heinrich Lübke (Note: Heinrich Lübke resigned on 2 September 1959.)	CDU
North Rhine-Westphalia	87	Oberhausen	Martin Heix	CDU
North Rhine-Westphalia	88	Mülheim	Max Vehar	CDU
North Rhine-Westphalia	89	Essen I	Walter Kühlthau	CDU
North Rhine-Westphalia	90	Essen II	Karl Bergmann	SPD
North Rhine-Westphalia	91	Essen III	Hans Toussaint	CDU
North Rhine-Westphalia	92	Duisburg I	Leo Storm	CDU
North Rhine-Westphalia	93	Duisburg II	Fritz Berendsen (Note: Fritz Berendsen resigned on 15 September 1969.)	CDU
North Rhine-Westphalia	94	Borken – Bocholt – Ahaus	Theodor Blank	CDU
North Rhine-Westphalia	95	Steinfurt – Tecklenburg	Georg Pelster	CDU
North Rhine-Westphalia	96	Beckum – Warendorf	Heinrich Windelen	CDU
North Rhine-Westphalia	97	Münster-Stadt und -Land	Peter Nellen	CDU
North Rhine-Westphalia	98	Lüdinghausen – Coesfeld	Hubert Schulze-Pellengahr	CDU
North Rhine-Westphalia	99	Gelsenkirchen	Robert Geritzmann	SPD
North Rhine-Westphalia	100	Recklinghausen-Land	Friedrich Wilhelm Willeke	CDU
North Rhine-Westphalia	101	Recklinghausen-Stadt	Bernhard Winkelheide	CDU
North Rhine-Westphalia	102	Gladbeck – Bottrop	Johann Harnischfeger	CDU
North Rhine-Westphalia	103	Warburg – Höxter – Büren	Josef Menke	CDU
North Rhine-Westphalia	104	Paderborn – Wiedenbrück	Rainer Barzel	CDU
North Rhine-Westphalia	105	Bielefeld – Halle	Frieda Nadig	SPD
North Rhine-Westphalia	106	Bielefeld-Stadt	Otto Walpert (Note: Otto Walpert resigned on 12 January 1960.)	SPD
North Rhine-Westphalia	107	Herford-Stadt und -Land	Heinrich Höcker	SPD
North Rhine-Westphalia	108	Detmold	August Berlin	SPD
North Rhine-Westphalia	109	Lemgo	Wilhelm Mellies (Note: Wilhelm Mellies died on 19 May 1958.)	SPD
North Rhine-Westphalia	110	Minden – Lübbecke	Paul Bleiß	SPD
North Rhine-Westphalia	111	Wattenscheid – Wanne-Eickel	Erich Meyer	SPD
North Rhine-Westphalia	112	Herne – Castrop-Rauxel	Ulrich Berger	CDU
North Rhine-Westphalia	113	Ennepe-Ruhr – Witten	Heinrich Sträter	SPD
North Rhine-Westphalia	114	Hagen	Luise Rehling	CDU
North Rhine-Westphalia	115	Dortmund I	Walter Menzel	SPD
North Rhine-Westphalia	116	Dortmund II	Dietrich Keuning	SPD
North Rhine-Westphalia	117	Dortmund III – Lünen	Walter Behrendt	SPD
North Rhine-Westphalia	118	Bochum	Franzjosef Müser	CDU
North Rhine-Westphalia	119	Iserlohn-Stadt und -Land	Johannes Kunze (Note: Johannes Kunze died on 11 October 1959.)	CDU
North Rhine-Westphalia	120	Unna – Hamm	Ernst von Bodelschwingh	CDU
North Rhine-Westphalia	121	Meschede – Olpe	Franz Lenze	CDU
North Rhine-Westphalia	122	Arnsberg – Soest	Ernst Majonica	CDU
North Rhine-Westphalia	123	Lippstadt – Brilon	Bernhard Balkenhol	CDU
North Rhine-Westphalia	124	Altena – Lüdenscheid	Peterheinrich Kirchhoff	CDU
North Rhine-Westphalia	125	Siegen-Stadt und Land – Wittgenstein	Theodor Siebel	CDU
North Rhine-Westphalia	List		Luise Albertz	SPD
North Rhine-Westphalia	List		Heinrich Auge	SPD
North Rhine-Westphalia	List		Rudolf Bäumer	SPD
North Rhine-Westphalia	List		August Bruse	SPD
North Rhine-Westphalia	List		Fritz Büttner	SPD
North Rhine-Westphalia	List		Heinrich Deist	SPD
North Rhine-Westphalia	List		Wilhelm Dopatka	SPD
North Rhine-Westphalia	List		Elfriede Eilers	SPD
North Rhine-Westphalia	List		Fritz Eschmann	SPD
North Rhine-Westphalia	List		Alfred Gleisner (Note: Alfred Gleisner resigned on 17 March 1959.)	SPD
North Rhine-Westphalia	List		Heinrich Hamacher	SPD
North Rhine-Westphalia	List		Johann Karl Heide	SPD
North Rhine-Westphalia	List		Rudolf-Ernst Heiland	SPD
North Rhine-Westphalia	List		Fritz Heinrich (Note: Fritz Heinrich died on 7 March 1959.)	SPD
North Rhine-Westphalia	List		Josef Hellenbrock	SPD
North Rhine-Westphalia	List		Josef Hufnagel	SPD
North Rhine-Westphalia	List		Hans Iven	SPD
North Rhine-Westphalia	List		Werner Jacobi	SPD
North Rhine-Westphalia	List		Wenzel Jaksch	SPD
North Rhine-Westphalia	List		Alma Kettig	SPD
North Rhine-Westphalia	List		Georg Richard Kinat	SPD
North Rhine-Westphalia	List		Liesel Kipp-Kaule	SPD
North Rhine-Westphalia	List		Jakob Koenen	SPD
North Rhine-Westphalia	List		Willy Könen	SPD
North Rhine-Westphalia	List		Friedrich Kraus	SPD
North Rhine-Westphalia	List		Herbert Kriedemann	SPD
North Rhine-Westphalia	List		Heinz Kühn	SPD
North Rhine-Westphalia	List		Erwin Lange	SPD
North Rhine-Westphalia	List		Wilhelm Lantermann	SPD
North Rhine-Westphalia	List		Ulrich Lohmar	SPD
North Rhine-Westphalia	List		Karl-Heinz Lünenstraß	SPD
North Rhine-Westphalia	List		Heinz Pöhler	SPD
North Rhine-Westphalia	List		Severin Fritz Pütz	SPD
North Rhine-Westphalia	List		Hugo Rasch (Note: Hugo Rasch died on 15 September 1960.)	SPD
North Rhine-Westphalia	List		Margarete Rudoll	SPD
North Rhine-Westphalia	List		Hanns Theis	SPD
North Rhine-Westphalia	List		Heinz Wegener	SPD
North Rhine-Westphalia	List		Erwin Welke	SPD
North Rhine-Westphalia	List		Heinrich Welslau	SPD
North Rhine-Westphalia	List		Helene Wessel	SPD
North Rhine-Westphalia	List		Karl Wienand	SPD
North Rhine-Westphalia	List		Hans-Jürgen Wischnewski	SPD
North Rhine-Westphalia	List		Otto Striebeck (Note: Otto Striebeck took office on 27 May 1958, to succeed Wilhelm Mellies.)	SPD
North Rhine-Westphalia	List		Arthur Killat (Note: Arthur Killat took office on 19 March 1959, to succeed Fritz Heinrich.)	SPD
North Rhine-Westphalia	List		Josef Scheuren (Note: Josef Scheuren took office on 20 March 1959, to succeed Alfred Gleisner.)	SPD
North Rhine-Westphalia	List		Hubert Jungherz (Note: Hubert Jungherz took office on 19 January 1960, to succeed Otto Walpert.)	SPD
North Rhine-Westphalia	List		Wilhelm Altvater (Note: Wilhelm Altvater took office on 22 September 1960, to succeed Hugo Rasch.)	SPD
North Rhine-Westphalia	List		Wolfgang Bartels	CDU
North Rhine-Westphalia	List		Curt Becker	CDU
North Rhine-Westphalia	List		Bernhard Bergmeyer	CDU
North Rhine-Westphalia	List		Kurt Birrenbach	CDU
North Rhine-Westphalia	List		Valentin Brück	CDU
North Rhine-Westphalia	List		Fritz Burgbacher	CDU
North Rhine-Westphalia	List		Hermann Diebäcker	CDU
North Rhine-Westphalia	List		Hermann Ehren	CDU
North Rhine-Westphalia	List		Ernst Theodor Eichelbaum	CDU
North Rhine-Westphalia	List		Margarete Engländer	CDU
North Rhine-Westphalia	List		Bert Even	CDU
North Rhine-Westphalia	List		Martin Frey	CDU
North Rhine-Westphalia	List		Albrecht Gehring	CDU
North Rhine-Westphalia	List		Karl Hahn	CDU
North Rhine-Westphalia	List		Carl Hesberg	CDU
North Rhine-Westphalia	List		Elfriede Klemmert	CDU
North Rhine-Westphalia	List		Georg Kliesing	CDU
North Rhine-Westphalia	List		Waldemar Kraft	CDU
North Rhine-Westphalia	List		Hans Krüger	CDU
North Rhine-Westphalia	List		Theodor Mengelkamp	CDU
North Rhine-Westphalia	List		Josef Mick	CDU
North Rhine-Westphalia	List		Maria Niggemeyer	CDU
North Rhine-Westphalia	List		Richard Oetzel	CDU
North Rhine-Westphalia	List		Maria Pannhoff	CDU
North Rhine-Westphalia	List		Robert Pferdmenges	CDU
North Rhine-Westphalia	List		Gerhard Philipp	CDU
North Rhine-Westphalia	List		Josef Rösing	CDU
North Rhine-Westphalia	List		Heinrich Scheppmann	CDU
North Rhine-Westphalia	List		Viktoria Steinbiß	CDU
North Rhine-Westphalia	List		Theodor Teriete	CDU
North Rhine-Westphalia	List		Helene Weber	CDU
North Rhine-Westphalia	List		Heinrich Wehking	CDU
North Rhine-Westphalia	List		Emmi Welter	CDU
North Rhine-Westphalia	List		Heinrich Wullenhaupt	CDU
North Rhine-Westphalia	List		Hans Meis (Note: Hans Meis took office on 2 July 1958, to succeed Karl Arnold.)	CDU
North Rhine-Westphalia	List		Hermann A. Eplée (Note: Hermann A. Eplée took office on 8 September 1958, to succeed Franz Meyers.)	CDU
North Rhine-Westphalia	List		Caspar Krüger (Note: Caspar Krüger took office on 15 December 1958, to succeed Josef Gockeln.)	CDU
North Rhine-Westphalia	List		Hanns-Gero von Lindeiner (Note: Hanns-Gero von Lindeiner took office on 8 September 1959, to succeed Heinrich Lübke.)	CDU
North Rhine-Westphalia	List		Gerhard Kisters (Note: Gerhard Kisters took office on 21 September 1959, to succeed Fritz Berendsen.)	CDU
North Rhine-Westphalia	List		Johannes Brüns (Note: Johannes Brüns took office on 26 October 1959, to succeed Johannes Kunze, but later resigned on 28 November 1960.)	CDU
North Rhine-Westphalia	List		Dietrich Hahne (Note: Dietrich Hahne took office on 7 December 1959, to succeed Fritz Hellwig.)	CDU
North Rhine-Westphalia	List		Josef Rommerskirchen (Note: Josef Rommerskirchen took office on 12 December 1960, to succeed Johannes Brüns.)	CDU
North Rhine-Westphalia	List		Ernst Achenbach	FDP
North Rhine-Westphalia	List		Wolfgang Döring	FDP
North Rhine-Westphalia	List		Otto Dowidat	FDP
North Rhine-Westphalia	List		Lotte Friese-Korn	FDP
North Rhine-Westphalia	List		Viktor Hoven	FDP
North Rhine-Westphalia	List		Ernst Keller	FDP
North Rhine-Westphalia	List		Walther Kühn	FDP
North Rhine-Westphalia	List		Erich Mende	FDP
North Rhine-Westphalia	List		Egon Wilhelm Ramms	FDP
North Rhine-Westphalia	List		Walter Scheel	FDP
North Rhine-Westphalia	List		Siegfried Zoglmann	FDP
North Rhine-Westphalia	List		Victor-Emanuel Preusker	DP
North Rhine-Westphalia	List		Heinrich Schild	DP
Hesse	126	Waldeck	Karl Bechert	SPD
Hesse	127	Kassel	Holger Börner	SPD
Hesse	128	Eschwege	Egon Höhmann	SPD
Hesse	129	Fritzlar-Homberg	Kurt Wittmer-Eigenbrodt	CDU
Hesse	130	Hersfeld	Carl Reinhard	CDU
Hesse	131	Marburg	Ludwig Preiß	DP
Hesse	132	Wetzlar	Wilhelm Reitz	SPD
Hesse	133	Gießen	Hans Merten	SPD
Hesse	134	Fulda	Hermann Götz	CDU
Hesse	135	Obertaunuskreis	Berthold Martin	CDU
Hesse	136	Friedberg	Lucie Beyer	SPD
Hesse	137	Limburg	Josef Arndgen	CDU
Hesse	138	Wiesbaden	Elisabeth Schwarzhaupt	CDU
Hesse	139	Hanau	Jakob Altmaier	SPD
Hesse	140	Frankfurt/M I	Peter Horn	CDU
Hesse	141	Frankfurt/M II	Walter Leiske	CDU
Hesse	142	Frankfurt/M III	Franz Böhm	CDU
Hesse	143	Groß-Gerau	Hermann Schmitt-Vockenhausen	SPD
Hesse	144	Offenbach/M	Karl Kanka	CDU
Hesse	145	Darmstadt	Ludwig Metzger	SPD
Hesse	146	Dieburg	Heinrich Georg Ritzel	SPD
Hesse	147	Bergstraße	Heinrich von Brentano	CDU
Hesse	List		Wilhelm Gontrum	CDU
Hesse	List		Walter Löhr	CDU
Hesse	List		Elisabeth Pitz-Savelsberg	CDU
Hesse	List		Eckhard Reith	CDU
Hesse	List		Clemens Riedel	CDU
Hesse	List		Cläre Schmitt	CDU
Hesse	List		August Weimer	CDU
Hesse	List		Hans Wilhelmi	CDU
Hesse	List		Josef Worms	CDU
Hesse	List		Harri Bading	SPD
Hesse	List		Willi Birkelbach	SPD
Hesse	List		Gerhard Jahn	SPD
Hesse	List		Georg Leber	SPD
Hesse	List		Ernst Meyer	SPD
Hesse	List		Carl Stenger	SPD
Hesse	List		Georg Stierle	SPD
Hesse	List		Karl Wittrock	SPD
Hesse	List		Max Becker (Note: Max Becker died on 29 July 1960.)	FDP
Hesse	List		Oswald Adolph Kohut	FDP
Hesse	List		Wolfgang Mischnick	FDP
Hesse	List		Fritz Walter	FDP
Hesse	List		Knut von Kühlmann-Stumm (Note: Knut von Kühlmann-Stumm took office on 8 August 1960, to succeed Max Becker.)	FDP
Hesse	List		August-Martin Euler (Note: August-Martin Euler resigned on 10 September 1958.)	DP
Hesse	List		Helmuth Schranz	DP
Hesse	List		Ludwig Schneider (Note: Ludwig Schneider took office on 10 September 1958, to succeed August-Martin Euler.)	DP
Rhineland-Palatinate	148	Altenkirchen (Westerwald)	Franz-Josef Wuermeling	CDU
Rhineland-Palatinate	149	Ahrweiler	Johann Peter Josten	CDU
Rhineland-Palatinate	150	Koblenz	Karl Weber	CDU
Rhineland-Palatinate	151	Cochem	Paul Gibbert	CDU
Rhineland-Palatinate	152	Kreuznach	Wilhelm Dröscher	SPD
Rhineland-Palatinate	153	Prüm	Hans Richarts	CDU
Rhineland-Palatinate	154	Trier	Alois Zimmer	CDU
Rhineland-Palatinate	155	Westerburg	Robert Stauch	CDU
Rhineland-Palatinate	156	Mainz	Josef Schlick	CDU
Rhineland-Palatinate	157	Worms	Willy Müller	SPD
Rhineland-Palatinate	158	Ludwigshafen am Rhein	Friedrich Wilhelm Wagner	SPD
Rhineland-Palatinate	159	Neustadt an der Weinstraße	Ludwig Knobloch	CDU
Rhineland-Palatinate	160	Kaiserslautern	August Spies	CDU
Rhineland-Palatinate	161	Zweibrücken	Josef Becker	CDU
Rhineland-Palatinate	162	Speyer	Albert Leicht	CDU
Rhineland-Palatinate	List		Emil Bettgenhäuser	SPD
Rhineland-Palatinate	List		Anton Diel (Note: Anton Diel died on 6 April 1959.)	SPD
Rhineland-Palatinate	List		Luise Herklotz	SPD
Rhineland-Palatinate	List		Peter Jacobs	SPD
Rhineland-Palatinate	List		Adolf Ludwig	SPD
Rhineland-Palatinate	List		Willy Odenthal	SPD
Rhineland-Palatinate	List		Max Seither	SPD
Rhineland-Palatinate	List		Oskar Munzinger (Note: Oskar Munzinger took office on 20 April 1959, to succeed Anton Diel, but later resigned on 1 October 1959.)	SPD
Rhineland-Palatinate	List		Elfriede Seppi (Note: Elfriede Seppi took office on 13 October 1959, to succeed Oskar Munzinger.)	SPD
Rhineland-Palatinate	List		Annemarie Ackermann	CDU
Rhineland-Palatinate	List		Jakob Diel	CDU
Rhineland-Palatinate	List		Jakob Franzen	CDU
Rhineland-Palatinate	List		Gerhard Fritz	CDU
Rhineland-Palatinate	List		Mathilde Gantenberg	CDU
Rhineland-Palatinate	List		August Kunst	CDU
Rhineland-Palatinate	List		Karl Atzenroth	FDP
Rhineland-Palatinate	List		Fritz Glahn (Note: Fritz Glahn resigned on 2 November 1959.)	FDP
Rhineland-Palatinate	List		Fritz-Rudolf Schultz	FDP
Rhineland-Palatinate	List		Anton Eberhard (Note: Anton Eberhard took office on 4 November 1959, to succeed Fritz Glahn.)	FDP
Baden-Württemberg	163	Stuttgart I	Artur Jahn	CDU
Baden-Württemberg	164	Stuttgart II	Erwin Häussler	CDU
Baden-Württemberg	165	Ludwigsburg	Raban Adelmann	CDU
Baden-Württemberg	166	Heilbronn	Karl Simpfendörfer	CDU
Baden-Württemberg	167	Böblingen	Paul Bausch	CDU
Baden-Württemberg	168	Eßlingen	Thomas Ruf	CDU
Baden-Württemberg	169	Göppingen	Hermann Finckh	CDU
Baden-Württemberg	170	Ulm	Ludwig Erhard	CDU
Baden-Württemberg	171	Aalen	Rudolf Vogel	CDU
Baden-Württemberg	172	Backnang	Eugen Gerstenmaier	CDU
Baden-Württemberg	173	Crailsheim	Josef Brönner (Note: Josef Brönner died on 21 January 1958.)	CDU
Baden-Württemberg	174	Waiblingen	Friedrich Fritz	CDU
Baden-Württemberg	175	Karlsruhe-Stadt	Friedrich Werber	CDU
Baden-Württemberg	176	Mannheim-Stadt	Carlo Schmid	SPD
Baden-Württemberg	177	Heidelberg	Eduard Wahl	CDU
Baden-Württemberg	178	Karlsruhe-Land	Gottfried Leonhard	CDU
Baden-Württemberg	179	Bruchsal	August Neuburger	CDU
Baden-Württemberg	180	Mannheim-Land	Hermann Lindrath (Note: Hermann Lindrath died on 27 February 1960.)	CDU
Baden-Württemberg	181	Sinsheim	Fritz Baier	CDU
Baden-Württemberg	182	Tauberbischofsheim	August Berberich	CDU
Baden-Württemberg	183	Konstanz	Josef Schüttler	CDU
Baden-Württemberg	184	Donaueschingen	Anton Hilbert	CDU
Baden-Württemberg	185	Lörrach	Herbert Wolff (Note: Herbert Wolff resigned on 15 October 1958.)	CDU
Baden-Württemberg	186	Freiburg	Hermann Kopf	CDU
Baden-Württemberg	187	Emmendingen	Heinrich Höfler	CDU
Baden-Württemberg	188	Offenburg	Hans Furler	CDU
Baden-Württemberg	189	Rastatt	Ludwig Kroll	CDU
Baden-Württemberg	190	Reutlingen	Gustav-Adolf Gedat	CDU
Baden-Württemberg	191	Calw	Arved Deringer	CDU
Baden-Württemberg	192	Rottweil	Bruno Heck	CDU
Baden-Württemberg	193	Balingen	Walter Gaßmann	CDU
Baden-Württemberg	194	Biberach	Bernhard Bauknecht	CDU
Baden-Württemberg	195	Ravensburg	Kurt Georg Kiesinger (Note: Kurt Georg Kiesinger resigned on 19 February 1959.)	CDU
Baden-Württemberg	List		Helmut Bazille	SPD
Baden-Württemberg	List		Fritz Corterier	SPD
Baden-Württemberg	List		Clara Döhring	SPD
Baden-Württemberg	List		Fritz Erler	SPD
Baden-Württemberg	List		Walter Faller	SPD
Baden-Württemberg	List		Hans Geiger	SPD
Baden-Württemberg	List		Friedrich Maier (Note: Friedrich Maier died on 14 December 1960.)	SPD
Baden-Württemberg	List		Oskar Matzner	SPD
Baden-Württemberg	List		Emmy Meyer-Laule	SPD
Baden-Württemberg	List		Karl Mommer	SPD
Baden-Württemberg	List		Karl Müller	SPD
Baden-Württemberg	List		Ernst Paul	SPD
Baden-Württemberg	List		Werner Pusch	SPD
Baden-Württemberg	List		Ludwig Ratzel (Note: Ludwig Ratzel resigned on 21 June 1960.)	SPD
Baden-Württemberg	List		Friedrich Schäfer	SPD
Baden-Württemberg	List		Marta Schanzenbach	SPD
Baden-Württemberg	List		Erwin Schoettle	SPD
Baden-Württemberg	List		Hugo Rimmelspacher (Note: Hugo Rimmelspacher took office on 27 June 1960, to succeed Ludwig Ratzel.)	SPD
Baden-Württemberg	List		Hans Bay (Note: Hans Bay took office on 20 December 1960, to succeed Friedrich Maier.)	SPD
Baden-Württemberg	List		Hildegard Bleyler	CDU
Baden-Württemberg	List		Karl August Bühler	CDU
Baden-Württemberg	List		Herbert Czaja	CDU
Baden-Württemberg	List		Josef Maier	CDU
Baden-Württemberg	List		Julie Rösch	CDU
Baden-Württemberg	List		Eugen Maucher (Note: Eugen Maucher took office on 30 January 1958, to succeed Josef Brönner.)	CDU
Baden-Württemberg	List		Hermann Schwörer (Note: Hermann Schwörer took office on 21 October 1958, to succeed Herbert Wolff.)	CDU
Baden-Württemberg	List		Wilhelm Adam Lulay (Note: Wilhelm Adam Lulay took office on 23 February 1959, to succeed Kurt Georg Kiesinger.)	CDU
Baden-Württemberg	List		Hugo Hauser (Note: Hugo Hauser took office on 11 March 1960, to succeed Hermann Lindrath.)	CDU
Baden-Württemberg	List		Ewald Bucher	FDP
Baden-Württemberg	List		Emmy Diemer-Nicolaus	FDP
Baden-Württemberg	List		Hermann Dürr	FDP
Baden-Württemberg	List		Hans Lenz	FDP
Baden-Württemberg	List		Reinhold Maier (Note: Reinhold Maier resigned on 30 September 1959.)	FDP
Baden-Württemberg	List		Robert Margulies	FDP
Baden-Württemberg	List		Adolf Mauk	FDP
Baden-Württemberg	List		Wolfgang Rutschke	FDP
Baden-Württemberg	List		Kurt Spitzmüller	FDP
Baden-Württemberg	List		Willy Stahl	FDP
Baden-Württemberg	List		Fritz Weber	FDP
Baden-Württemberg	List		Klaus Freiherr von Mühlen (Note: Klaus Freiherr von Mühlen took office on 6 October 1959, to succeed Reinhold Maier.)	FDP
Baden-Württemberg	List		Wilhelm Probst	DP
Bavaria	196	Altötting	Josef Bauer	CSU
Bavaria	197	Fürstenfeldbruck	Richard Jaeger	CSU
Bavaria	198	Ingolstadt	Hans Demmelmeier	CSU
Bavaria	199	Miesbach	Franz Gleissner	CSU
Bavaria	200	Munich North	Siegfried Balke	CSU
Bavaria	201	Munich East	Georg Lang	CSU
Bavaria	202	Munich South	Karl Wieninger	CSU
Bavaria	203	Munich West	Anton Besold	CSU
Bavaria	204	Munich Land	Franz Seidl	CSU
Bavaria	205	Rosenheim	Ludwig Franz	CSU
Bavaria	206	Traunstein	Wolfgang Klausner (Note: Wolfgang Klausner died on 17 April 1958.)	CSU
Bavaria	207	Weilheim	Franz Josef Strauss	CSU
Bavaria	208	Deggendorf	Stefan Dittrich	CSU
Bavaria	209	Landshut	Friedrich Zimmermann	CSU
Bavaria	210	Passau	Fritz Schäffer	CSU
Bavaria	211	Pfarrkirchen	Friedrich Kempfler	CSU
Bavaria	212	Straubing	Josef Lermer	CSU
Bavaria	213	Vilshofen	Franz Xaver Unertl	CSU
Bavaria	214	Amberg	Heinrich Aigner	CSU
Bavaria	215	Burglengenfeld	Hans Drachsler	CSU
Bavaria	216	Cham	Alois Niederalt	CSU
Bavaria	217	Regensburg	Hermann Höcherl	CSU
Bavaria	218	Tirschenreuth	Hugo Geiger	CSU
Bavaria	219	Bamberg	Emil Kemmer	CSU
Bavaria	220	Bayreuth	Albrecht Schlee	CSU
Bavaria	221	Coburg	Friedrich Knorr	CSU
Bavaria	222	Forchheim	Karl Theodor Freiherr von und zu Guttenberg	CSU
Bavaria	223	Hof	Gerhard Wacher	CSU
Bavaria	224	Kulmbach	Gustav Sühler	CSU
Bavaria	225	Ansbach	Friedrich Bauereisen	CSU
Bavaria	226	Erlangen	Werner Dollinger	CSU
Bavaria	227	Nuremberg	Georg Stiller	CSU
Bavaria	228	Nuremberg-Fürth	Friedrich Winter	CSU
Bavaria	229	Schwabach	Georg Baron Manteuffel-Szoege	CSU
Bavaria	230	Weißenburg	Richard Stücklen	CSU
Bavaria	231	Aschaffenburg	Karl-Heinz Vogt	CSU
Bavaria	232	Bad Kissingen	Gustav Fuchs	CSU
Bavaria	233	Karlstadt	Maria Probst	CSU
Bavaria	234	Schweinfurt	Friedrich Funk	CSU
Bavaria	235	Würzburg	Linus Memmel	CSU
Bavaria	236	Augsburg-Stadt	Otto Weinkamm	CSU
Bavaria	237	Augsburg-Land	Josef Oesterle (Note: Josef Oesterle died on 31 August 1959.)	CSU
Bavaria	238	Dillingen	Hans Schütz	CSU
Bavaria	239	Donauwörth	Philipp Meyer	CSU
Bavaria	240	Kaufbeuren	Josef Spies	CSU
Bavaria	241	Kempten	Georg Krug	CSU
Bavaria	242	Memmingen	Hans August Lücker	CSU
Bavaria	List		Lisa Albrecht (Note: Lisa Albrecht died on 16 May 1958.)	SPD
Bavaria	List		Adolf Arndt	SPD
Bavaria	List		Hans Bals	SPD
Bavaria	List		Hannsheinz Bauer	SPD
Bavaria	List		Valentin Baur	SPD
Bavaria	List		Arno Behrisch	SPD
Bavaria	List		Georg Dewald	SPD
Bavaria	List		Josef Felder	SPD
Bavaria	List		Alfred Frenzel (Note: Alfred Frenzel resigned on 4 November 1960.)	SPD
Bavaria	List		Hermann Haage	SPD
Bavaria	List		Herbert Hauffe	SPD
Bavaria	List		Karl Herold	SPD
Bavaria	List		Franz Höhne	SPD
Bavaria	List		Fritz Wilhelm Hörauf	SPD
Bavaria	List		Gerhard Kreyssig	SPD
Bavaria	List		Georg Kurlbaum	SPD
Bavaria	List		Franz Marx	SPD
Bavaria	List		Rudolf Metter	SPD
Bavaria	List		Hans Müller	SPD
Bavaria	List		Carl Prennel	SPD
Bavaria	List		Richard Reitzner	SPD
Bavaria	List		Max Seidel	SPD
Bavaria	List		Walter Seuffert	SPD
Bavaria	List		Käte Strobel	SPD
Bavaria	List		Ernst Zühlke	SPD
Bavaria	List		Erwin Folger (Note: Erwin Folger took office on 19 May 1958, to succeed Lisa Albrecht.)	SPD
Bavaria	List		Hans Lautenschlager (Note: Hans Lautenschlager took office on 9 November 1960, to succeed Alfred Frenzel.)	SPD
Bavaria	List		Otto Freiherr von Feury (Note: Otto Freiherr von Feury resigned on 10 December 1957.)	CSU
Bavaria	List		Ingeborg Geisendörfer	CSU
Bavaria	List		Fritz von Haniel-Niethammer	CSU
Bavaria	List		Angelo Kramel	CSU
Bavaria	List		Edeltraud Kuchtner	CSU
Bavaria	List		Franz Wittmann	CSU
Bavaria	List		Walter Eckhardt (Note: Walter Eckhardt took office on 27 December 1957, to succeed Otto Freiherr von Feury.)	CSU
Bavaria	List		Edmund Leukert (Note: Edmund Leukert took office on 21 April 1958, to succeed Wolfgang Klausner.)	CSU
Bavaria	List		Georg Graf Henckel von Donnersmarck (Note: Georg Graf Henckel von Donnersmarck took office on 5 September 1959, to succeed Josef Oesterle.)	CSU
Bavaria	List		Thomas Dehler	FDP
Bavaria	List		Leonhard Murr	FDP
Bavaria	List		Wolfgang Stammberger	FDP
Bavaria	List		Heinz Starke	FDP
Saarland	243	Saarbrücken-Stadt	Heinrich Schneider	FDP
Saarland	244	Saarbrücken-Land	Heinrich Draeger	CDU
Saarland	245	Saarlouis – Merzig	Albert Baldauf	CDU
Saarland	246	Ottweiler – St. Wendel	Leo Gottesleben	CDU
Saarland	247	Homburg – St. Ingbert	Kurt Conrad (Note: Kurt Conrad resigned on 20 July 1959.)	SPD
Saarland	List		Hermann Mathias Görgen	CSU
Saarland	List		Franz Ruland	CSU
Saarland	List		Nikolaus Schreiner (Note: Nikolaus Schreiner resigned on 31 August 1958.)	SPD
Saarland	List		Werner Wilhelm (Note: Werner Wilhelm took office on 5 September 1958, to succeed Nikolaus Schreiner.)	SPD
Saarland	List		Rudolf Recktenwald (Note: Rudolf Recktenwald took office on 11 August 1959, to succeed Kurt Conrad, but later resigned on 20 October 1959.)	SPD
Saarland	List		Robert Bach (Note: Robert Bach took office on 27 October 1959, to succeed Rudolf Recktenwald.)	SPD
West Berlin			Margarete Berger-Heise	SPD
West Berlin			Wilhelm Königswarter	SPD
West Berlin			Edith Krappe	SPD
West Berlin			Kurt Mattick	SPD
West Berlin			Kurt Neubauer	SPD
West Berlin			Franz Neumann	SPD
West Berlin			Ernst Scharnowski	SPD
West Berlin			Ernst Schellenberg	SPD
West Berlin			Richard Schröter	SPD
West Berlin			Klaus Schütz	SPD
West Berlin			Franz Seume	SPD
West Berlin			Jeanette Wolff	SPD
West Berlin			Ernst Benda	CDU
West Berlin			Ferdinand Friedensburg	CDU
West Berlin			Johann Baptist Gradl	CDU
West Berlin			Heinrich Krone	CDU
West Berlin			Ernst Lemmer	CDU
West Berlin			Agnes Katharina Maxsein	CDU
West Berlin			Josef Stingl	CDU
West Berlin			Marie-Elisabeth Lüders	FDP
West Berlin			Rudolf Will	FDP
West Berlin			Karl Hübner	FVP

== See also ==
- Politics of Germany
- List of Bundestag Members
