= Gelsenkirchen (electoral district) =

Federal electoral district of Germany

122 Gelsenkirchen
- Electoral district for the Bundestag
- Gelsenkirchen in 2025
- State: North Rhine-Westphalia
- Population: 259,600 (2019)
- Electorate: 168,496 (2021)
- Major settlements: Gelsenkirchen
- Area: 104.9 km^{2}

Current electoral district
- Created: 1949
- Party: SPD
- Member: Markus Töns
- Elected: 2017, 2021, 2025

Gelsenkirchen is an electoral constituency (German: Wahlkreis) represented in the Bundestag. It elects one member via first-past-the-post voting. Under the current constituency numbering system, it is designated as constituency 122. It is located in the Ruhr region of North Rhine-Westphalia, comprising the city of Gelsenkirchen.

Gelsenkirchen was created for the inaugural 1949 federal election. Since 2017, it has been represented by Markus Töns of the Social Democratic Party (SPD).

== Geography ==
Gelsenkirchen is located in the Ruhr region of North Rhine-Westphalia. As of the 2021 federal election, it is coterminous with the independent city of Gelsenkirchen.

== History ==
Gelsenkirchen was created in 1949. From 1965 through 1998, it was named Gelsenkirchen I. It acquired its current name in the 2002 election. In the 1949 election, it was North Rhine-Westphalia constituency 40 in the numbering system. From 1953 through 1961, it was number 99. From 1965 through 1976, it was number 97. From 1980 through 1998, it was number 93. From 2002 through 2009, it was number 124. In the 2013 through 2021 elections, it was number 123. From the 2025 election, it has been number 122.

Originally, the constituency was coterminous with the city of Gelsenkirchen. From 1965 through 1976, it comprised the Stadtteile of Hassel, Buer, Horst, Heßler, and Rotthausen. From 1980 through 1998, it comprised the Stadtbezirke of Mitte, West, and Süd. Since the 2002 election, it has again been coterminous with the city of Gelsenkirchen.

Election	No.	Name	Borders
1949	40	Gelsenkirchen	Gelsenkirchen city
1953	99	Gelsenkirchen	Gelsenkirchen city
1957	99	Gelsenkirchen	Gelsenkirchen city
1961	99	Gelsenkirchen	Gelsenkirchen city
1965	97	Gelsenkirchen I	Gelsenkirchen city (only Hassel, Buer, Horst, Heßler, and Rotthausen Stadtteile)
1969	97	Gelsenkirchen I	Gelsenkirchen city (only Hassel, Buer, Horst, Heßler, and Rotthausen Stadtteile)
1972	97	Gelsenkirchen I	Gelsenkirchen city (only Hassel, Buer, Horst, Heßler, and Rotthausen Stadtteile)
1976	97	Gelsenkirchen I	Gelsenkirchen city (only Hassel, Buer, Horst, Heßler, and Rotthausen Stadtteile)
1980	93	Gelsenkirchen I	Gelsenkirchen city (only Hassel, Mitte, West, and Süd Stadtbezirke)
1983	93	Gelsenkirchen I	Gelsenkirchen city (only Hassel, Mitte, West, and Süd Stadtbezirke)
1987	93	Gelsenkirchen I	Gelsenkirchen city (only Hassel, Mitte, West, and Süd Stadtbezirke)
1990	93	Gelsenkirchen I	Gelsenkirchen city (only Hassel, Mitte, West, and Süd Stadtbezirke)
1994	93	Gelsenkirchen I	Gelsenkirchen city (only Hassel, Mitte, West, and Süd Stadtbezirke)
1998	93	Gelsenkirchen I	Gelsenkirchen city (only Hassel, Mitte, West, and Süd Stadtbezirke)
2002	124	Gelsenkirchen	Gelsenkirchen city
2005	124	Gelsenkirchen	Gelsenkirchen city
2009	124	Gelsenkirchen	Gelsenkirchen city
2013	123	Gelsenkirchen	Gelsenkirchen city
2017	123	Gelsenkirchen	Gelsenkirchen city
2021	123	Gelsenkirchen	Gelsenkirchen city
2025	122	Gelsenkirchen	Gelsenkirchen city

== Members ==
The constituency has been held continuously by the Social Democratic Party (SPD) since its creation. It was first represented by Robert Geritzmann from 1949 to 1961, followed by Walter Arendt for a single term. Josef Löbbert was elected at the 1965 federal election and served three terms. Heinz Menzel then served one term from 1976 to 1980. Joachim Poß was representative from 1980 to 2017, a total of ten consecutive terms. Markus Töns succeeded him in the 2017 election. He was re-elected in 2021 and 2025.

Election	Member	Party	%
1949	Robert Geritzmann	SPD	36.5
1953	Robert Geritzmann	SPD	43.5
1957	Robert Geritzmann	SPD	47.5
1961	Walter Arendt	SPD	48.6
1965	Josef Löbbert	SPD	56.2
1969	Josef Löbbert	SPD	58.9
1972	Josef Löbbert	SPD	66.2
1976	Heinz Menzel	SPD	63.0
1980	Joachim Poß	SPD	59.9
1983	Joachim Poß	SPD	60.2
1987	Joachim Poß	SPD	59.4
1990	Joachim Poß	SPD	55.9
1994	Joachim Poß	SPD	59.3
1998	Joachim Poß	SPD	65.4
2002	Joachim Poß	SPD	60.3
2005	Joachim Poß	SPD	59.7
2009	Joachim Poß	SPD	54.3
2013	Joachim Poß	SPD	50.5
2017	Markus Töns	SPD	38.3
2021	Markus Töns	SPD	40.5
2025	Markus Töns	SPD	31.4

== Election results ==
=== 2025 election ===
Federal election (2025): Gelsenkirchen
Notes:	Blue background denotes the winner of the electorate vote. Pink background denotes a candidate elected from their party list. Yellow background denotes an electorate win by a list member, or other incumbent. A ✓ or ✗ denotes status of any incumbent, win or lose respectively.						
Party	Candidate	Votes	%	±%	Party votes	%	±%
SPD	✓ Markus Töns	38,118	31.4	▼9.1	29,342	24.1	▼13.0
AfD	Friedhelm Rikowski	31,302	25.8	▲11.8	30,032	24.7	▲11.9
CDU	Sascha Kurth	28,051	23.1	▲3.3	27,665	22.7	▲2.9
Left	Martin Gatzemier	10,246	8.4	▲5.2	11,485	9.4	▲6.0
Greens	Irene Mihalic	7,379	6.1	▼4.1	7,944	6.5	▼3.5
BSW					6,174	5.1	
FDP	Marco Buschmann	4,038	3.3	▼4.8	3,682	3.0	▼5.7
Tierschutzpartei					2,359	1.9	▼0.4
FW	Frank Perlik	1,720	1.4	▲0.5	626	0.5	▼0.1
PARTEI				▼1.7	685	0.6	▼0.6
MLPD	Lisa Gärtner	599	0.5	▲0.2	239	0.2	0.0
Volt					444	0.4	▲0.2
Team Todenhöfer					442	0.4	▼1.2
dieBasis				▼1.0	191	0.2	▼0.5
PdF					167	0.1	▲0.1
BD					142	0.1	
MERA25					100	0.1	
Values					57	0.0	0.0
Pirates							▼0.4
Gesundheitsforschung							▼0.2
Humanists							▼0.1
Bündnis C							0.0
ÖDP						0.0	0.0
SGP						0.0	0.0
Informal votes		1,223			900		
Total valid votes		121,453			121,776		
Turnout		122,676	74.5	▲7.8			
SPD hold	Majority	6,816	5.6				

=== 2021 election ===
Federal election (2021): Gelsenkirchen
Notes:	Blue background denotes the winner of the electorate vote. Pink background denotes a candidate elected from their party list. Yellow background denotes an electorate win by a list member, or other incumbent. A ✓ or ✗ denotes status of any incumbent, win or lose respectively.						
Party	Candidate	Votes	%	±%	Party votes	%	±%
SPD	✓ Markus Töns	44,965	40.5	▲2.1	41,326	37.1	▲3.7
CDU	Laura Rosen	21,954	19.8	▼5.6	22,091	19.9	▼2.6
AfD	Jörg Schneider	15,555	14.0	▼2.9	14,204	12.8	▼4.3
Greens	Irene Mihalic	11,286	10.2	▲5.5	11,170	10.0	▲5.4
FDP	Marco Buschmann	9,014	8.1	▲1.4	9,721	8.7	▼0.4
Left	Ayten Kaplan	3,559	3.2	▼3.3	3,853	3.5	▼3.9
Tierschutzpartei					2,572	2.3	▲1.2
Team Todenhöfer					1,753	1.6	
PARTEI	Claudia Kapuschinski	1,904	1.7		1,245	1.1	▲0.3
dieBasis	Frank Lustig	1,118	1.0		775	0.7	
FW	Frank Perlik	1,054	0.9	▼0.1	723	0.6	▲0.3
Pirates					394	0.4	▼0.1
MLPD	Lisa Gärtner	356	0.3	▼0.2	222	0.2	▼0.1
Independent	Ronald Wetklo	319	0.3				
Volt					186	0.2	
LIEBE					184	0.2	
NPD					181	0.2	▼0.2
Gesundheitsforschung					176	0.2	0.0
LfK					128	0.1	
V-Partei3					70	0.1	0.0
Humanists					69	0.1	0.0
Bündnis C					55	0.0	
ÖDP					51	0.0	0.0
du.					51	0.0	
DKP					28	0.0	0.0
PdF					22	0.0	
LKR					21	0.0	
SGP					13	0.0	0.0
Informal votes		1,233			1,033		
Total valid votes		111,084			111,284		
Turnout		112,317	66.7	▼1.5			
SPD hold	Majority	23,011	20.7	▲7.7			

=== 2017 election ===
Federal election (2017): Gelsenkirchen
Notes:	Blue background denotes the winner of the electorate vote. Pink background denotes a candidate elected from their party list. Yellow background denotes an electorate win by a list member, or other incumbent. A ✓ or ✗ denotes status of any incumbent, win or lose respectively.						
Party	Candidate	Votes	%	±%	Party votes	%	±%
SPD	Markus Töns	45,017	38.3	▼12.1	39,524	33.5	▼10.6
CDU	Oliver Wittke	29,768	25.4	▼3.3	26,452	22.4	▼5.3
AfD	Jörg Schneider	19,836	16.9	▲13.1	20,113	17.0	▲12.3
FDP	Marco Buschmann	7,864	6.7	▲5.0	10,834	9.2	▲6.2
Left	Ingrid Remmers	7,614	6.5	▲0.4	8,703	7.4	▼0.2
Greens	Irene Mihalic	5,444	4.6	▲1.0	5,489	4.6	▼0.8
AD-DEMOKRATEN					1,904	1.6	
Tierschutzpartei					1,273	1.1	
PARTEI					1,010	0.9	▲0.5
Pirates					550	0.5	▼1.7
FW	Iris Häger	1,276	1.1	▲0.5	461	0.4	0.0
NPD					417	0.4	▼1.8
MLPD	Lisa Ursula Gärtner	602	0.5	▲0.1	384	0.3	0.0
Gesundheitsforschung					163	0.1	
Volksabstimmung					132	0.1	▼0.1
BGE					115	0.1	
ÖDP					109	0.1	0.0
V-Partei³					109	0.1	
DiB					100	0.1	
DM					86	0.1	
Die Humanisten					75	0.1	
DKP					39	0.0	
SGP					24	0.0	0.0
Informal votes		1,993			1,348		
Total valid votes		117,421			118,066		
Turnout		119,414	68.2	▲2.9			
SPD hold	Majority	15,249	12.9	▼9.0			

=== 2013 election ===
Federal election (2013): Gelsenkirchen
Notes:	Blue background denotes the winner of the electorate vote. Pink background denotes a candidate elected from their party list. Yellow background denotes an electorate win by a list member, or other incumbent. A ✓ or ✗ denotes status of any incumbent, win or lose respectively.						
Party	Candidate	Votes	%	±%	Party votes	%	±%
SPD	✓ Joachim Poß	58,967	50.5	▼3.8	51,514	44.0	▲2.1
CDU	Oliver Wittke	33,460	28.6	▲2.6	32,380	27.7	▲4.5
Left	Ingrid Remmers	7,112	6.1		8,880	7.6	▼4.5
AfD	Hartmut Preuß	4,405	3.8		5,553	4.7	
Greens	Irene Mihalic	4,270	3.7	▼3.9	6,413	5.5	▼1.4
NPD	Dennis Blömer	2,833	2.4	▼1.1	2,562	2.2	▲0.5
Pirates	Axel Kerstan	2,670	2.3		2,569	2.2	▲0.4
FDP	Marco Buschmann	1,933	1.7	▼5.4	3,468	3.0	▼6.1
PRO					702	0.6	
REP					463	0.4	▼0.5
PARTEI					456	0.4	
BIG					455	0.4	
FW		701	0.6		448	0.4	
MLPD		493	0.4	▼1.1	398	0.3	0.0
Volksabstimmung					205	0.2	▲0.1
Nichtwahler					120	0.1	
Party of Reason					112	0.1	
ÖDP					82	0.1	0.0
RRP					81	0.1	▼0.1
Die Rechte					48	0.0	
PSG					22	0.0	0.0
BüSo					17	0.0	0.0
Informal votes		1,608			1,504		
Total valid votes		116,844			116,948		
Turnout		118,452	65.3	▲0.4			
SPD hold	Majority	25,507	21.9	▼6.3			

=== 2009 election ===
Federal election (2009): Gelsenkirchen
Notes:	Blue background denotes the winner of the electorate vote. Pink background denotes a candidate elected from their party list. Yellow background denotes an electorate win by a list member, or other incumbent. A ✓ or ✗ denotes status of any incumbent, win or lose respectively.						
Party	Candidate	Votes	%	±%	Party votes	%	±%
SPD	✓ Joachim Poß	64,623	54.3	▼5.4	50,435	42.0	▼11.8
CDU	Wolfgang Meckelburg	31,011	26.1	▼0.3	27,930	23.2	0.0
Greens	Robert Zion	9,013	7.6	▲4.9	8,327	6.9	▲1.2
Left					14,497	12.1	▲4.2
FDP	Marco Buschmann	8,344	7.0	▲4.5	10,846	9.0	▲3.6
Pirates					2,148	1.8	
NPD	Joseph Mertens	4,199	3.5	▲2.0	2,018	1.7	▲0.5
REP					1,094	0.9	▲0.2
Tierschutzpartei					818	0.7	▲0.1
FAMILIE					573	0.5	▲0.1
RENTNER					510	0.4	
MLPD	Stefan Klaus Engel	1,831	1.5	▲1.1	454	0.4	0.0
RRP					158	0.1	
Volksabstimmung					112	0.1	0.0
DVU					108	0.1	
Centre					67	0.1	0.0
ÖDP					52	0.0	
BüSo					33	0.0	0.0
PSG					21	0.0	0.0
Informal votes		2,652			1,472		
Total valid votes		119,021			120,201		
Turnout		121,673	64.9	▼8.7			
SPD hold	Majority	33,612	28.2	▼5.1			

=== 2005 election ===
Federal election (2005): Gelsenkirchen
Notes:	Blue background denotes the winner of the electorate vote. Pink background denotes a candidate elected from their party list. Yellow background denotes an electorate win by a list member, or other incumbent. A ✓ or ✗ denotes status of any incumbent, win or lose respectively.						
Party	Candidate	Votes	%	±%	Party votes	%	±%
SPD	✓ Joachim Poß	83,649	59.7	▼0.6	75,529	53.8	▼2.7
CDU	Wolfgang Meckelburg	37,012	26.4	▲0.7	32,603	23.2	▼0.48
Left	Ralf Herrmann	9,496	6.8	▲5.4	11,087	7.9	▲6.5
Greens	Robert Zion	3,733	2.7	▼2.1	8,017	5.7	▼1.4
FDP	Marco Buschmann	3,467	2.5	▼2.7	7,688	5.5	▼1.4
NPD	Anke Salterberg	2,206	1.6		1,640	1.2	▼0.9
REP					1,031	0.7	▼0.5
Tierschutzpartei					748	0.5	
GRAUEN					644	0.5	▲0.2
MLPD	Stefan Engel	616	0.4		515	0.4	
Familie					549	0.4	
PBC					189	0.1	
From Now on... Democracy Through Referendum					106	0.1	
Socialist Equality Party					74	0.0	
Centre					51	0.0	
BüSo					39	0.0	0.0
Informal votes		2,298			1,967		
Total valid votes		140,179			140,510		
Turnout		142,477	73.6	▼1.3			
SPD hold	Majority	46,637	33.3				
