= Robert Bach =

Robert Bach may refer to:

- Robert J. Bach (born 1961), American executive at Microsoft
- Robert Bach (politician) (1901–1976), German politician
