= Gleisner =

Gleisner is a surname. Notable people with the surname include:

- Alfred Gleisner (1908–1991), German politician
- Tom Gleisner (born 1962), Australian actor and director
