= Theodor Rocholl =

German artist

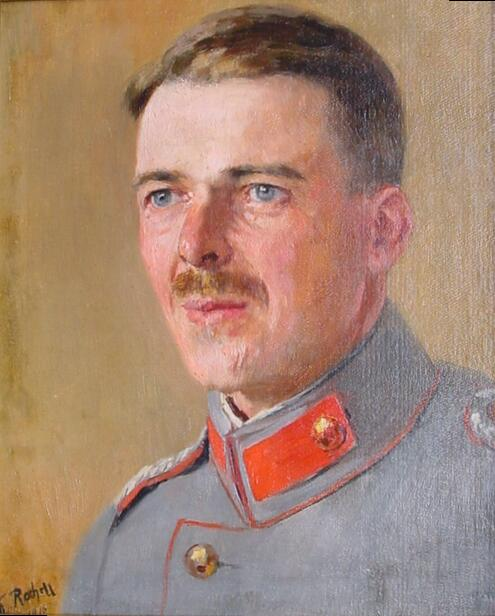
- Self-portrait (1916)
- Born: 11 June 1854; Sachsenberg, Germany
- Died: 14 September 1933 (aged 79); Düsseldorf, Germany
- Known for: War art

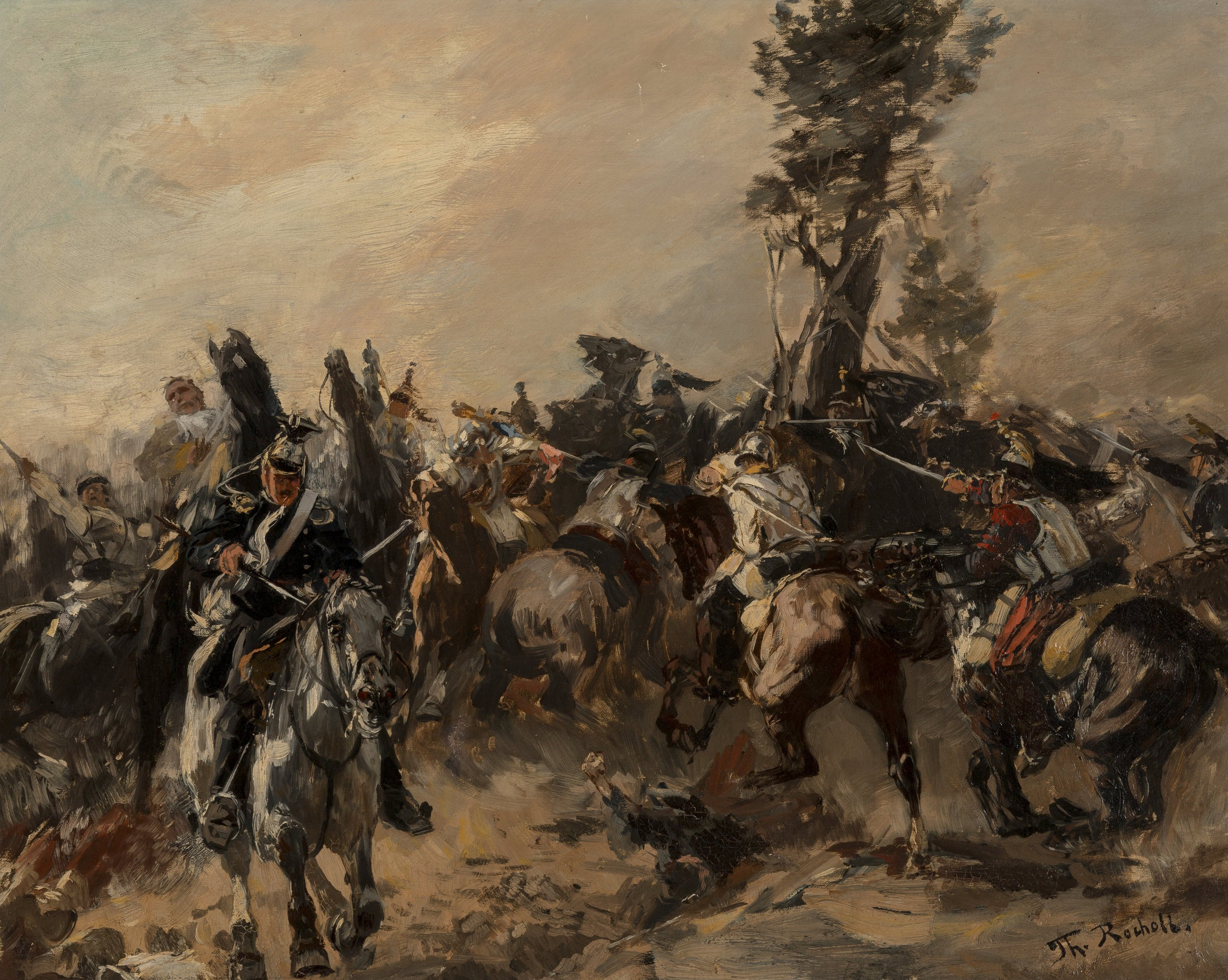
Battle Scene

Theodor Rudoff Rocholl (1854–1933) was a German military painter and war artist.

== Life and work ==
Rocholl was born in Sachsenberg (Waldeck) on 11 June 1854, the son of Rudolf Rocholl, the Lutheran theologian and philosopher. He was a student in Munich in 1877, then at the Dresden Academy. After a year, he moved to Munich where he studied historical painting under Karl von Piloty. He completed his art studies at the Düsseldorf Academy where he developed his interest in military art under the influence of Wilhelm Camphausen; his contemporaries in this field were Carl Röchling and Richard Knötel. He is associated with the Düsseldorf school of painting.

He observed the Franco-Prussian War and the subsequent German army manoeuvres between 1883 and 1888; in 1890, he traveled to Russia to view the German Garde-Korps on manoeuvre. Later in the decade, he was attached to the Turkish Army and covered the conflict in Thessalia in 1897 between the Turks and the Greeks; his sketches of the fighting were published the following year. He covered the Boxer Rebellion in 1900 as the official artist of the German expeditionary force. A decade later, he covered the fighting between Turkey and Albania.

Many of his paintings depict German military scenes, especially the battles of the Franco-Prussian War. One of his most famous pictures depicted King William at the Battle of Sedan, meeting his triumphant soldiers after the victory. Rocholl also painted a large mural for the Evangelischen Padagogiums in Bad Godesberg.

In his 60th year, he became a war artist covering the campaign on the Western Front. His War Letters printed in 1916 in which he described the fear and destruction. An autobiography of his life as a painter appeared in 1921. He died in a streetcar accident in Düsseldorf on 14 September 1933, when he was 79.
