= Feury =

Feury is a surname. Notable people with the name include:

- Otto Freiherr von Feury (1906–1998), German politician
- Peggy Feury (1924–1985), American stage and film actress

== See also ==
- Mount Feury, a mountain between Sikorski Glacier and Frankenfield Glacier on the northeast side of Noville Peninsula, Thurston Island
