= Wilhelm Gülich =

German politician (1895–1960)

Member of the Bundestag
- In office 7 September 1949 – 15 April 1960

Personal details
- Born: 7 June 1895 Sachsenberg
- Died: 15 April 1960 (aged 64)
- Party: SPD

Wilhelm Gülich (June 7, 1895 – April 15, 1960) was a German politician of the Social Democratic Party (SPD) and member of the German Bundestag.

== Life ==
Gülich was a member of the state parliament in Schleswig-Holstein from 1947 to 1950. There he represented the constituency of Lauenburg/Elbe. From 8 May 1947 to 28 August 1949, Gülich was chairman of the Landtag Committee for Constitution and Rules of Procedure.

From 1949 until his death in 1960, he was a member of the German Bundestag, where he was Deputy Chairman of the Committee for Finance and Taxation from 1953 to 1957.

== Literature ==
Herbst, Ludolf; Jahn, Bruno (2002). Vierhaus, Rudolf (ed.). Biographisches Handbuch der Mitglieder des Deutschen Bundestages. 1949–2002 [Biographical Handbook of the Members of the German Bundestag. 1949–2002] (in German). München: De Gruyter - De Gruyter Saur. p. 1715. ISBN 978-3-11-184511-1.
