= Anton Eberhard =

German politician (1892–1967)

Member of the Bundestag
- In office 3 October 1952 – 15 October 1961

Personal details
- Born: 9 April 1892 Rechberghausen
- Died: 3 June 1967 (aged 75)
- Party: FDP

Anton Eberhard (9 November 1892 – 3 June 1967) was a German politician of the Free Democratic Party (FDP) and former member of the German Bundestag.

== Life ==
He was a member of the Rhineland-Palatinate state parliament from 1951 to 1953 and was chairman of the FDP faction there in 1951/52. He was a member of the German Bundestag from 3 October 1952, when he succeeded Wilhelm Nowack, who had been appointed Minister of Finance of Rhineland-Palatinate, until 1957, and again from 4 November 1959, when he succeeded Fritz Glahn, who had resigned, until 1961. He always entered parliament via the FDP state list for Rhineland-Palatinate.

== Literature ==
Herbst, Ludolf; Jahn, Bruno (2002). Vierhaus, Rudolf (ed.). Biographisches Handbuch der Mitglieder des Deutschen Bundestages. 1949–2002 [Biographical Handbook of the Members of the German Bundestag. 1949–2002] (in German). München: De Gruyter - De Gruyter Saur. p. 1715. ISBN 978-3-11-184511-1.
