= Walter Althammer =

German politician (1928–2025)

Member of the Bundestag; for Augsburg-Land
- In office 17 October 1961 – 14 April 1985
- Preceded by: Georg Graf Henckel von Donnersmarck
- Succeeded by: Ernst Josef Pöppl

Personal details
- Born: 12 March 1928 Augsburg, Germany
- Died: 16 February 2025 (aged 96)
- Party: Christian Social Union
- Education: LMU Munich; TU Munich; Speyer University

Walter Althammer (12 March 1928 – 16 February 2025) was a German politician who was a representative of the Christian Social Union in Bavaria.

Together with Hans-Jürgen Pohlenz (1927–2020; SPD), they were the last surviving members of the 4th Bundestag, and following the death of Elfriede Klemmert of the 3rd Bundestag on 13 April 2022, Althammer was the earliest-serving living former member of the Bundestag.

Althammer died on 16 February 2025, at the age of 96.

== See also ==
- List of Bavarian Christian Social Union politicians
