= Joachim Poß =

German politician

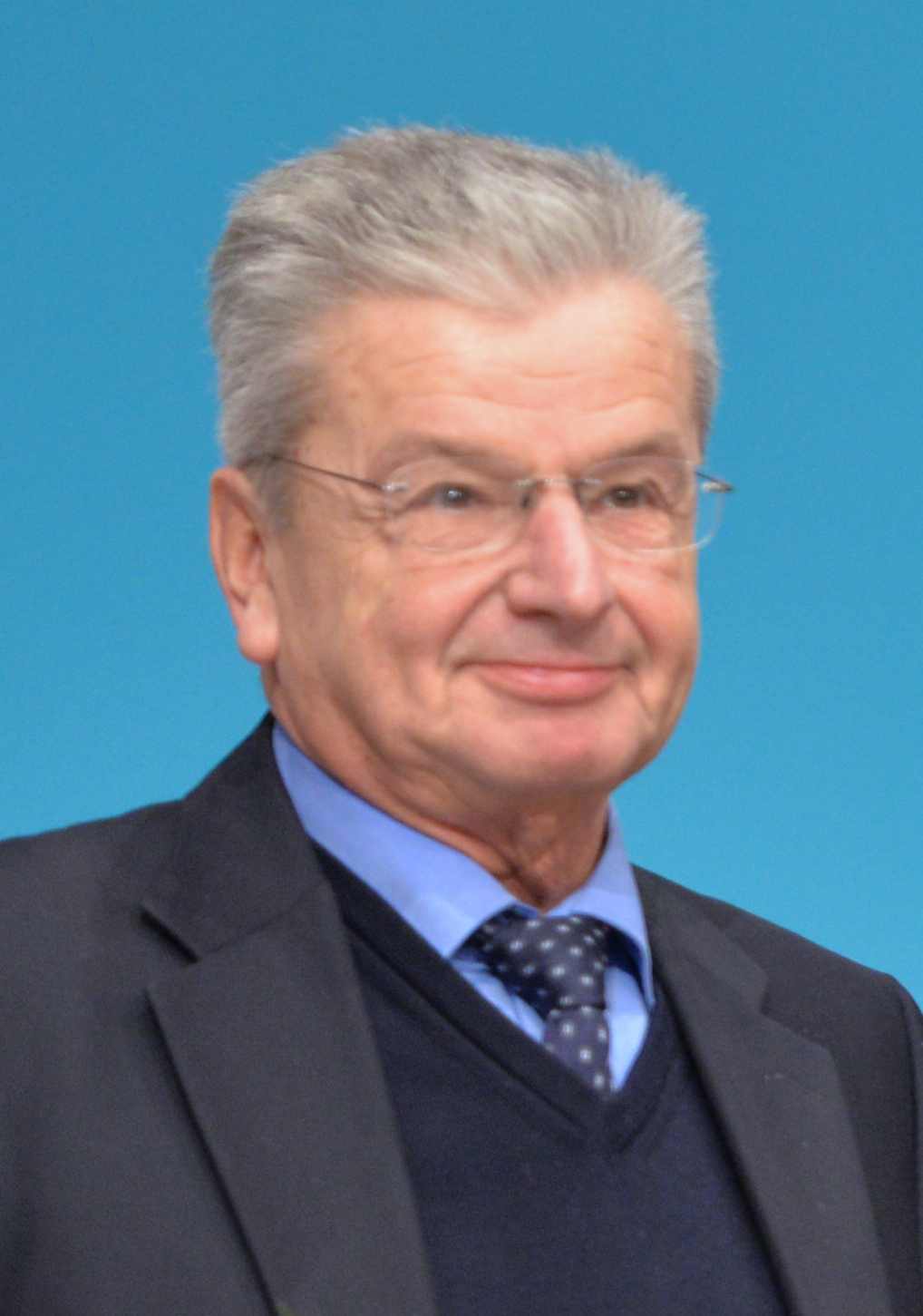
Joachim Poß in December 2015

Joachim “Jochen” Poß (born 27 December 1948 in Westerholt, Westphalia) is a German politician (SPD). He was a member of the German Bundestag from 1980 to 2017. Between 1999 and 2013, he served as one of the deputy chairpersons of the SPD parliamentary group. During the absence of the then parliamentary group leader Frank-Walter Steinmeier from August to October 2010, he also acted as executive chair of the SPD parliamentary group.

== Life and career ==
After completing the intermediate school certificate (Mittlere Reife) in 1965, Poß undertook training for the upper civil service and was promoted to city inspector in 1970. From 1972 to 1973, he completed his civilian service and then worked until 1980 as a full-time managing director and administrative head of the Socialist Youth of Germany – The Falcons (Sozialistische Jugend Deutschlands – Die Falken).

Joachim Poß is Roman Catholic, married, and has three children.

== Party ==
Poß joined the SPD in 1966. From 1980 to 1992 he was chairman, and from 1992 to 1999 deputy chairman, of the SPD subdistrict of Gelsenkirchen. From 1998 to 2001 he was also chairman of the SPD district of Western Westphalia. From 1999 to 2015, Poß was a member of the SPD party executive committee.

== Member of Parliament ==
From 1975 to 1980, Poß was a member of the Gelsenkirchen City Council, serving from 1977 as deputy chair of the SPD faction.

From the 1980 federal election, he was a member of the German Bundestag. He did not run in the 2017 election for the 19th Bundestag.

Joachim Poß was always directly elected to the Bundestag as the representative of the Gelsenkirchen I constituency, and since 2002 of the Gelsenkirchen constituency. In the 2005 federal election, he received 59.7% of the first votes there; in the 2009 election, he received 54.3%, the best first-vote result nationwide for an SPD Bundestag candidate. In 2013, he received 50.5% of the votes.

From 1988 to 1999, he was the financial policy spokesperson for the SPD parliamentary group. From 1999 to 2013, he served as deputy parliamentary group leader responsible for finance and the federal budget. From 2013 onward, he was a member of the Committee on European Union Affairs.

When Frank-Walter Steinmeier was unable to perform his duties as SPD parliamentary group leader in the Bundestag in 2010 due to illness following a kidney donation to his wife, he appointed Poß as interim chairman.

He was a member of the Committee on European Union Affairs and a deputy member of the Finance Committee.

== Awards ==
- 2006: Pipe Smoker of the Year 2013: Cross of Merit, 1st Class, of the Federal Republic of Germany 2018: Willy Brandt Medal

== Literature ==
- Rudolf Vierhaus, Ludolf Herbst (Hrsg.), Bruno Jahn (Mitarb.): Biographisches Handbuch der Mitglieder des Deutschen Bundestages. 1949–2002. Bd. 2: N–Z. Anhang. K. G. Saur, Munich 2002, ISBN 3-598-23782-0, S. 653.
