= Fritz Berendsen =

German politician (1904–1974)

Friedrich Jürgen Carl Brömel Berendsen
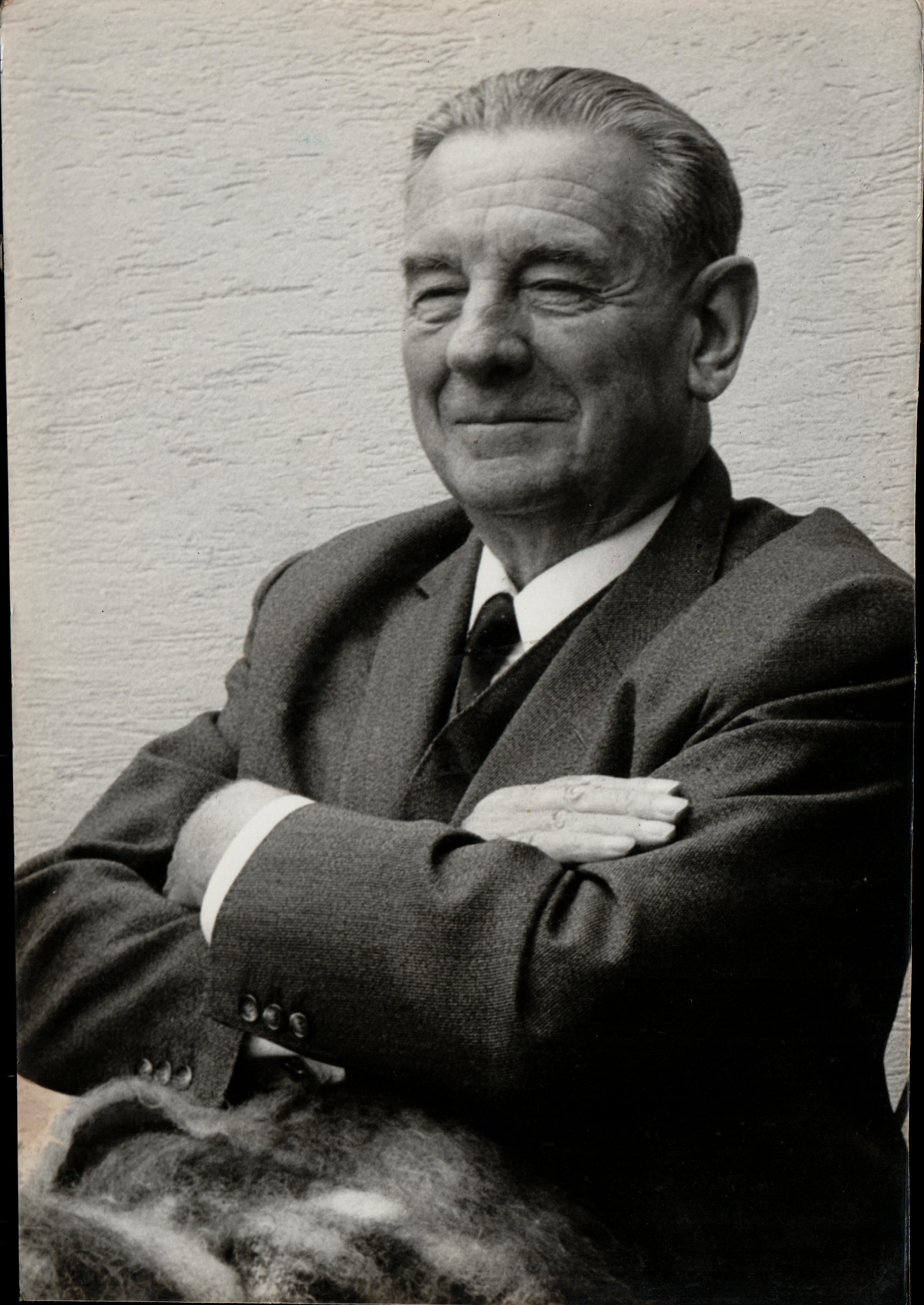

Member of the Bundestag
- In office 6 October 1953 – 15 September 1959
- In office 19 October 1965 – 19 October 1969

Personal details
- Born: 15 March 1904 Ratzeburg
- Died: 1 October 1974 (aged 70) Weinheim, Baden-Württemberg, Germany
- Party: CDU

Friedrich Jürgen Carl Brömel Berendsen (March 15, 1904 – October 1, 1974) was a German politician of the Christian Democratic Union (CDU) and former member of the German Bundestag.

== Life ==
He was a member of the German Bundestag from 1953 until his resignation on 15 September 1959. After his retirement he was again a member of the Bundestag from 1965 to 1969.

== Literature ==
Herbst, Ludolf; Jahn, Bruno (2002). Vierhaus, Rudolf (ed.). Biographisches Handbuch der Mitglieder des Deutschen Bundestages. 1949–2002 [Biographical Handbook of the Members of the German Bundestag. 1949–2002] (in German). München: De Gruyter - De Gruyter Saur. p. 1715. ISBN 978-3-11-184511-1.
