= Jörg Schneider (politician) =

German politician

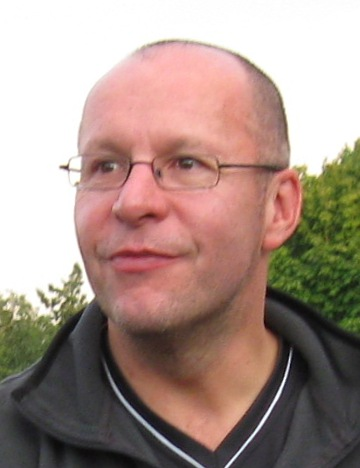

Member of the Bundestag
- Incumbent
- Assumed office 24 October 2017

Personal details
- Born: 14 May 1964 (age 61)
- Party: AfD

Jörg Schneider (born 14 May 1964) is a German politician for the Alternative for Germany (AfD) and since 2017 member of the Bundestag.

== Life and politics ==
Schneider was born 1956 in the West German town of Solingen and studied mechanical engineering at the Helmut Schmidt University. Schneider entered the newly founded populist AfD in 2013 and became a member of the Bundestag after the 2017 German federal election.
