= Markus Töns =

German politician

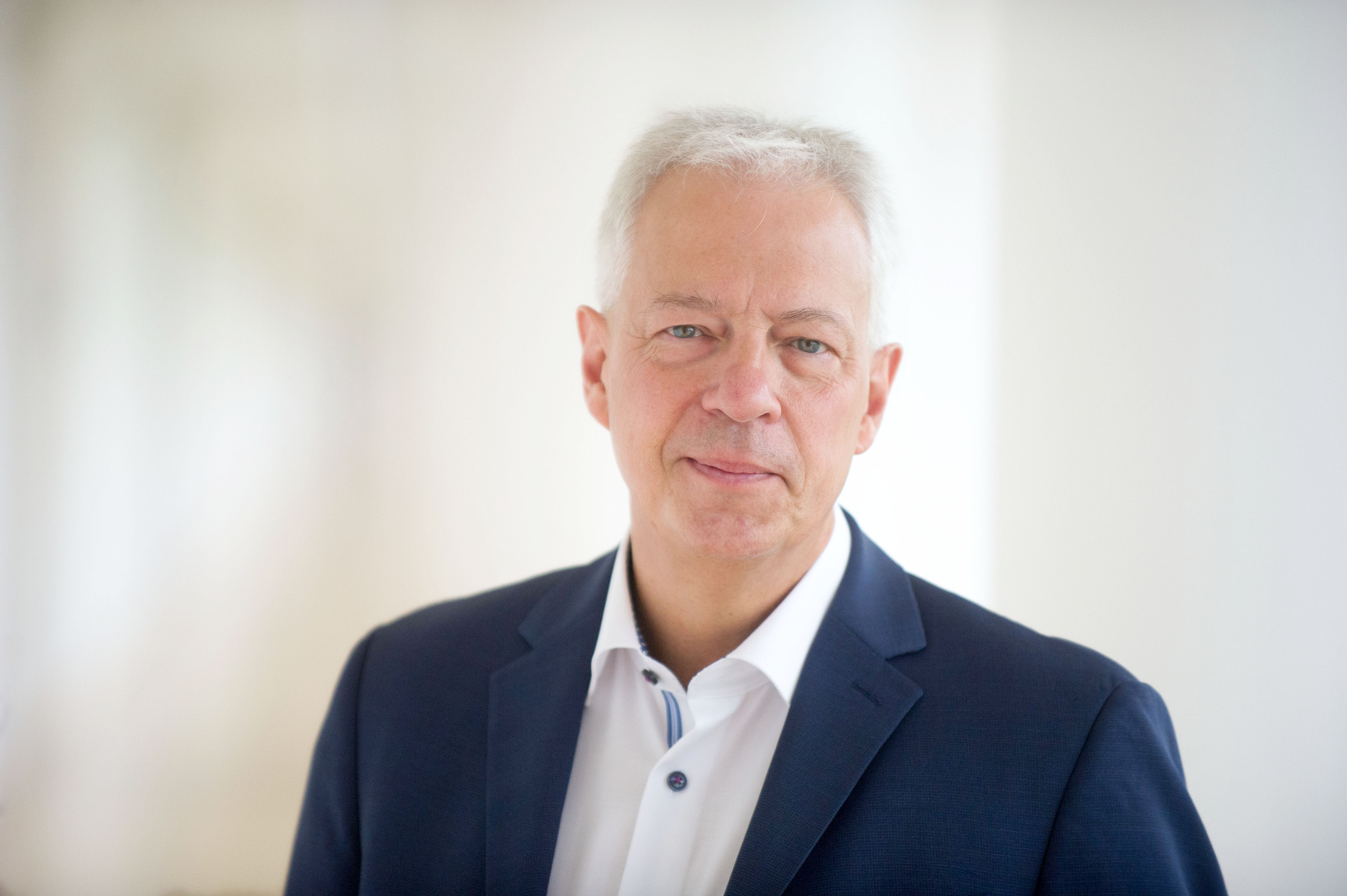
- Markus Töns in 2018

Member of the Bundestag
- Incumbent
- Assumed office 2017

Personal details
- Born: 1 January 1964 (age 62) Gelsenkirchen, West Germany (now Germany)
- Party: SPD

Markus Töns (born 1 January 1964) is a German politician of the Social Democratic Party (SPD) who has been serving as a member of the Bundestag from the state of North Rhine-Westphalia since 2017.

== Early life and career ==
Töns initially completed his schooling in 1981 with a vocational school certificate (Hauptschulabschluss). He then attended the Ricarda-Huch-Gymnasium in Gelsenkirchen, where he obtained his Abitur in 1985.

He studied political science at the Westfälische Wilhelms-Universität Münster and graduated as a political scientist in 1995. From 1996 to 2001, he worked as a consultant at the "Aktuelles Forum NRW", a non-profit organization for civic education. From 2002 to 2005, he was a research assistant to Hans Frey, a member of the North Rhine-Westphalian state parliament.

Töns is divorced and has three children: two daughters and a son.

== Political career ==
Markus Töns has been a member of the SPD since 1987. Initially, he was active from 1988 to 1992 on the board of the “Jusos” Gelsenkirchen, where he served as deputy chairman from 1990 to 1992.

From 2018 to 2025, Töns has been the Chairman of the SPD sub-district of Gelsenkirchen, having been a member of its board since 2004. Previously, he was Chairman (2002 to 2008) and Deputy Chairman (2000 to 2002) of the SPD local branch in Gelsenkirchen-Altstadt.

In the 2017 federal election, Markus Töns was elected as a direct representative for the Gelsenkirchen constituency to the German Bundestag. He succeeded Joachim Poß, who had been a directly elected member for Gelsenkirchen for 37 years and did not run again. Four years later, he won the direct mandate for the Gelsenkirchen constituency again. In the 2025 federal election, Markus Töns received 31.38 percent of the first votes in his constituency and was able to defend his direct mandate. He is a full member of the Committee of European Union Affairs. Additionally, in May 2025, he was appointed as the European Policy Spokesperson of the SPD Parliamentary Group in the Bundestag.

In the Bundestag, he was the spokesperson for the “Netzwerk Berlin” group within the SPD Parliamentary Group from 2023 to 2025. Since 2023 he is the spokesperson for the SPD-Bundestag members from the Ruhr area. Additionally, as an avowed fan of FC Schalke 04 e.V., he is both a member of the club and the chairman of the Bundestag fan club of FC Schalke 04 e.V., known as the Kuppelknappen.

Before his mandate as a member of the Bundestag, Töns was a member of the state parliament of North Rhine-Westphalia for the Gelsenkirchen II constituency from June 2005 to May 2017. From 2012 to 2017, he represented North Rhine-Westphalia in the Committee of the Regions in Brussels, where he was the first Vice-President of the PES Group from 2015 until his departure.

== Memberships ==
Markus Töns is a member of the trade unions ver.di, IG Metall and IGBCE, the Association for the Promotion of Youth Work of the DGB, the Worker's Welfare Association (AWO), and the non-partisan Europa-Union Deutschland, which advocates for a federal Europe and the European unification process. Additionally, he volunteers with aktuelles forum e. V., the Heinz-Urban Foundation, and the SPD Economic Forum e. V.

As a member of the supervisory board, Markus Töns is active in the Diakonie Ruhr gemeinnützige GmbH and in the Diakoniewerk Gelsenkirchen und Wattenscheid GmbH.

In the German Bundestag, Markus Töns is a member of the cross-party Parliamentary Group of the Europa-Union Deutschland, which advocates for a federal Europe and the European unification process.
