= Anton Diel =

German politician (1898–1959)

Member of the Bundestag
- In office 7 September 1949 – 6 April 1959

Personal details
- Born: 25 January 1898 Horressen
- Died: 6 April 1959 (aged 61)
- Party: SPD

Anton Diel (January 25, 1898 – April 6, 1959) was a German politician of the Social Democratic Party (SPD), and member of the German Bundestag.

He was a member of the German Bundestag from the first Bundestag elections in 1949 until his death. He always entered parliament via the Rhineland-Palatinate state list of the SPD.

== Literature ==
Herbst, Ludolf; Jahn, Bruno (2002). Vierhaus, Rudolf (ed.). Biographisches Handbuch der Mitglieder des Deutschen Bundestages. 1949–2002 [Biographical Handbook of the Members of the German Bundestag. 1949–2002] (in German). München: De Gruyter - De Gruyter Saur. p. 1715. ISBN 978-3-11-184511-1.
