= Johannes Kunze (politician) =

German politician

Member of the Bundestag
- In office 7 September 1949 – 11 October 1959

Personal details
- Born: 6 June 1892
- Died: 11 October 1959 (aged 67)
- Party: CDU

Johannes Kunze (6 June 1892 – 11 October 1959) was a German politician of the Christian Democratic Union (CDU) and former member of the German Bundestag.

== Life ==
Kunze was a member of the German Bundestag from its first election in 1949 until his death. In 1949 he entered parliament via the state list of the CDU North Rhine-Westphalia, in 1953 and 1957 he won the direct mandate in the constituency of Iserlohn-Stadt und -Land.

From 1949 until his death he was chairman of the Bundestag committee for equalization of burdens. From 1953 to 1957 he was deputy chairman of the CDU parliamentary group.

== Literature ==
Herbst, Ludolf; Jahn, Bruno (2002). Vierhaus, Rudolf (ed.). Biographisches Handbuch der Mitglieder des Deutschen Bundestages. 1949–2002 [Biographical Handbook of the Members of the German Bundestag. 1949–2002] (in German). München: De Gruyter - De Gruyter Saur. p. 1715. ISBN 978-3-11-184511-1.
