= Johannes Brüns =

German politician (1903–1965)

Member of the Bundestag
- In office 26 October 1959 – 28 November 1960

Personal details
- Born: 30 August 1903 Essen
- Died: 7 May 1965 (aged 61) Essen, North Rhine-Westphalia, Germany
- Party: CDU

Johannes Brüns (August 30, 1903 – May 7, 1965) was a German politician of the Christian Democratic Union (CDU) and former member of the German Bundestag.

== Life ==
He joined the CDU in 1946 and was a member of the city council of Essen and chairman of the social committee between 1948 and 1959. Between 1951 and 1957 he worked at Zeche Amalie, where he was also chairman of the works council. From 26 October 1959 to 28 November 1960 he was a member of the 3rd Bundestag as successor to the late Johann Kunze.

== Literature ==
Herbst, Ludolf; Jahn, Bruno (2002). Vierhaus, Rudolf (ed.). Biographisches Handbuch der Mitglieder des Deutschen Bundestages. 1949–2002 [Biographical Handbook of the Members of the German Bundestag. 1949–2002] (in German). München: De Gruyter - De Gruyter Saur. p. 1715. ISBN 978-3-11-184511-1.
