= Georg Graf Henckel von Donnersmarck =

German politician

Member of the Bundestag; from Bavaria
- In office 5 September 1959 – 17 October 1961
- Preceded by: Josef Oesterle
- Succeeded by: Walter Althammer
- Constituency: Augsburg-Land
- In office 6 October 1953 – 15 October 1957
- Constituency: State list

Personal details
- Born: 5 August 1902 Grambschütz, Lower Silesia
- Died: 2 May 1973 (aged 70) Bonn, West Germany
- Party: Christian Social Union
- Children: 8
- Relatives: Henckel von Donnersmarck family
- Education: University of Göttingen

Georg Graf Henckel von Donnersmarck (5 August 1902 – 2 May 1973) was a German politician (Christian Social Union in Bavaria (CSU)). Henckel von Donnersmarck was a member of the German Bundestag from 1953 to 1957 and from 5 September 1959, when he succeeded the late Josef Oesterle, until 1961.
