= Kurt Conrad =

German politician

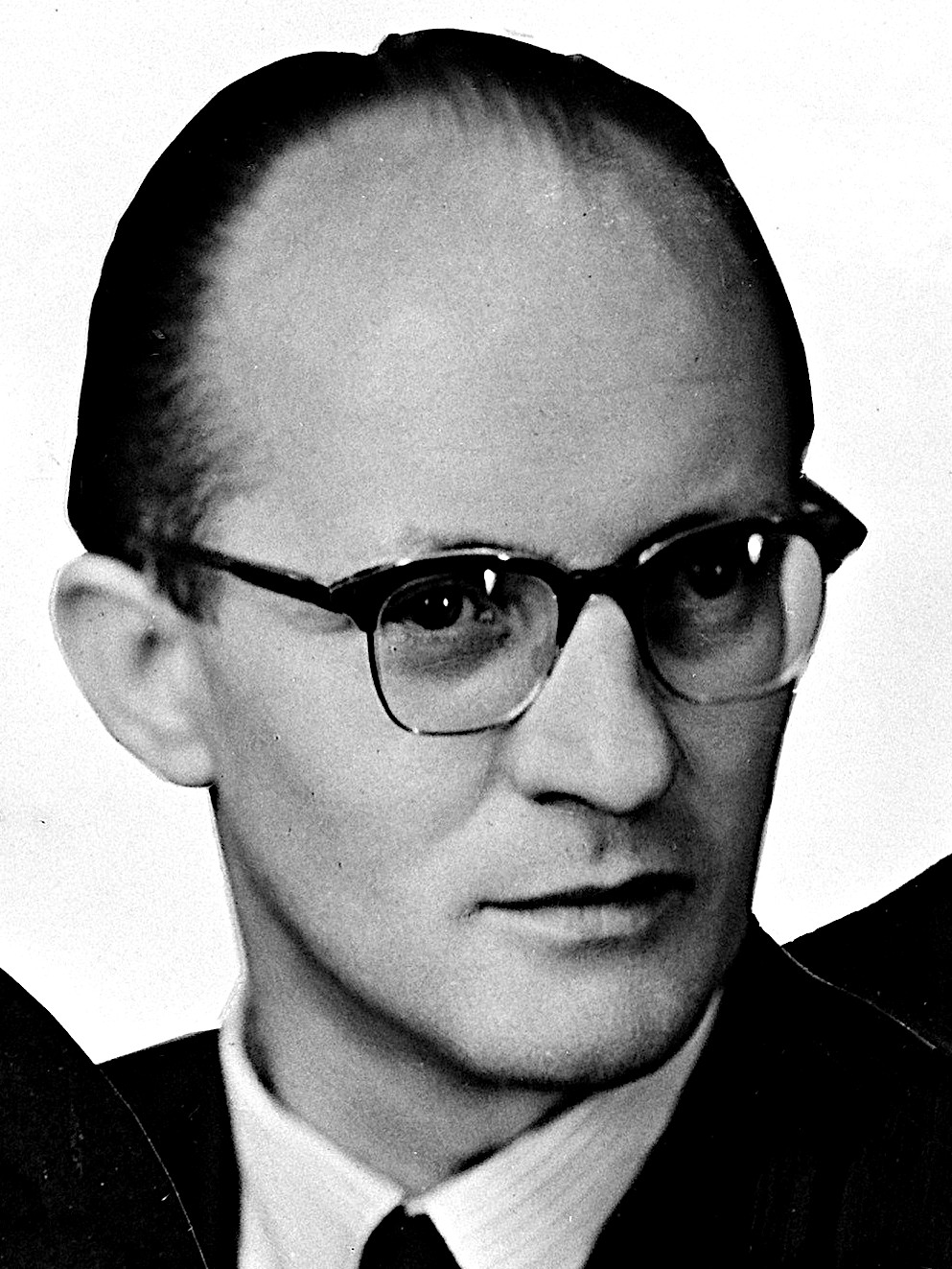
- Kurt Conrad

Member of the Bundestag
- In office 15 October 1957 – 20 July 1959

Member of the European Parliament
- In office 29 October 1957 – 25 February 1959

Personal details
- Born: 19 October 1911 Homburg
- Died: 16 July 1982 (aged 70)
- Party: SPD

Kurt Conrad (19 October 1911 – 16 July 1982) was a German politician of the Social Democratic Party (SPD) and former member of the German Bundestag.

== Life ==
Conrad was a member of the state parliament of Saarland from 1947 to 1952, 1955 to 1957 and 1960 to 1975. From 1961 to 1970 and 1971 to 1973 he was chairman of the SPD parliamentary group there. From 1957 until his resignation on 20 July 1959, Conrad was a member of the German Bundestag, where he represented the constituency of Homburg. From 29 October 1957 to 25 February 1959 he was also a member of the European Parliament.

== Literature ==
Herbst, Ludolf; Jahn, Bruno (2002). Vierhaus, Rudolf (ed.). Biographisches Handbuch der Mitglieder des Deutschen Bundestages. 1949–2002 [Biographical Handbook of the Members of the German Bundestag. 1949–2002] (in German). München: De Gruyter - De Gruyter Saur. p. 1715. ISBN 978-3-11-184511-1.
