= Max Becker (politician) =

German politician (1888–1960)

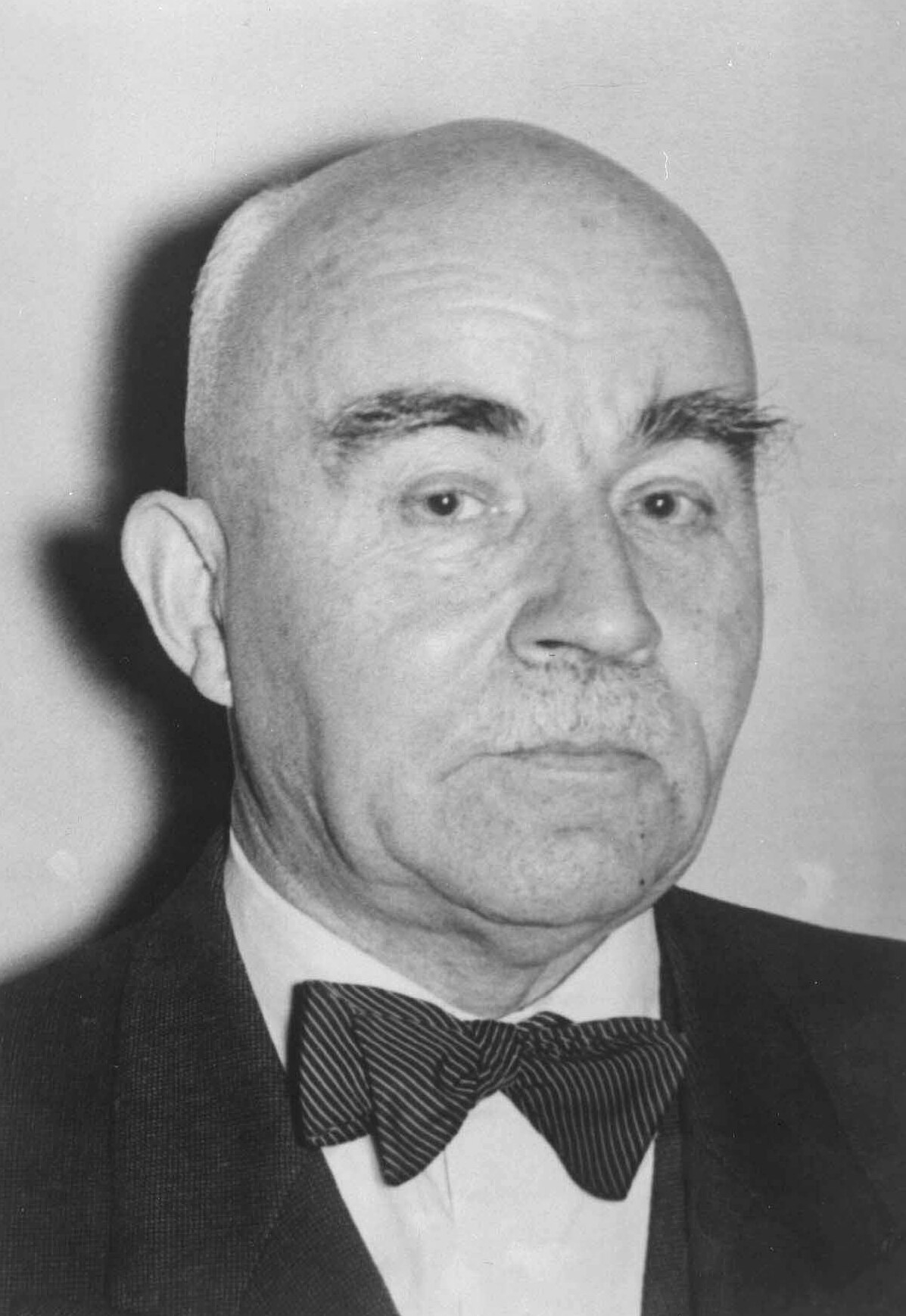

Member of the Bundestag
- In office 7 September 1949 – 29 July 1960

Personal details
- Born: 25 May 1888 Kassel
- Died: 29 July 1960 (aged 72)
- Party: FDP

Max Becker (May 25, 1888 – July 29, 1960) was a German politician of the Free Democratic Party (FDP) and former member of the German Bundestag.

== Life ==
After graduating from high school, Becker studied economics and law at the universities of Grenoble, Berlin, Halle (Saale), and Marburg, and settled in Bad Hersfeld in 1913 as a lawyer and notary. He fought in the First World War with the Imperial German Army. After the war, he resumed the practice of law. During the Weimar Republic, Becker became a member of the German People's Party. He served on the city council in Bad Hersfeld and, from 1919 to 1921, also was a member of the district council in the Hersfeld district. From 1922 to 1933, he was a member of the regional assembly of Kurhessen and the provincial parliament of the Prussian Province of Hesse-Nassau. From 1928, he started his own law practice in Bad Hersfeld and worked there throughout the Nazi regime.

After the end of the Second World War in 1945, Becker again became a member of the municipal council of Bad Hersfeld, and in 1946, he was again elected to the district council of the Hersfeld district. Becker was a member of the Landtag of Hesse from 1946 to 1949. He was a member of the parliamentary council in 1948/49, where he was secretary and chairman of the Committee on Electoral Law. He was a member of the German Bundestag from its first election in 1949 until his death.

== Sources ==
- Herbst, Ludolf; Jahn, Bruno (2002). Vierhaus, Rudolf (ed.). Biographisches Handbuch der Mitglieder des Deutschen Bundestages. 1949–2002 [Biographical Handbook of the Members of the German Bundestag. 1949–2002] (in German). München: De Gruyter - De Gruyter Saur. p. 1715. ISBN 978-3-11-184511-1.
- Becker, Richard Max Adolf in the Hessische Geschichte entdecken und erforschen
