= Josef Gockeln =

German politician (1900–1958)

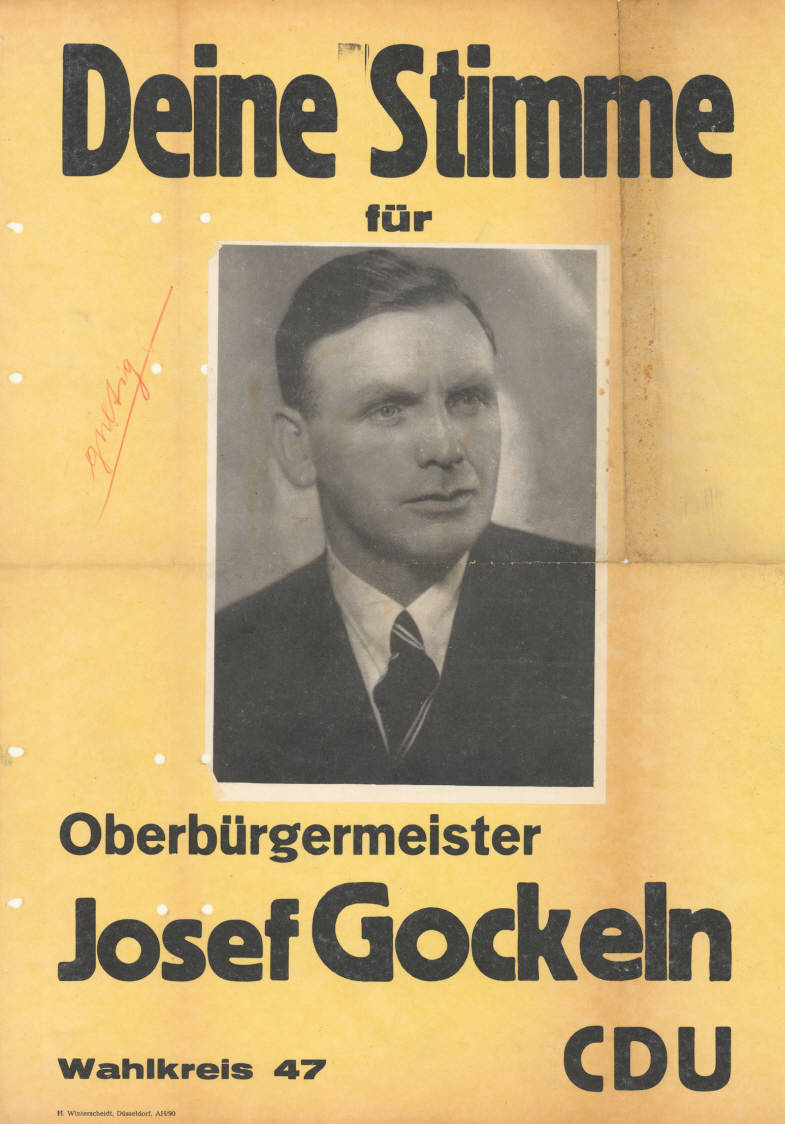
- Josef Gockeln on a state election poster 1950

Member of the Bundestag
- In office 7 September 1949 – 6 December 1958

Personal details
- Born: 18 March 1900
- Died: 6 December 1958 (aged 58), , Germany
- Party: CDU

Josef Gockeln (18 March 1900 – 6 December 1958) was a German politician of the Christian Democratic Union (CDU) and former member of the German Bundestag.

== Life ==
He was one of the co-founders of the CDU in Düsseldorf. In 1945/46 he was chairman of the Program Commission of the Rhineland Regional Association.

Gockeln became a member of the state parliament of North Rhine-Westphalia in 1946 and remained a member of parliament until his accidental death in 1958. On 19 May 1947 the state parliament elected him as its president. He also held this office until 1958. Gockeln was a member of the German Bundestag from the first federal election in 1949 until his death. He was directly elected in the constituency of Düsseldorf II in 1949 and in the neighbouring constituency of Düsseldorf I in 1953 and 1957.

== Literature ==
Herbst, Ludolf; Jahn, Bruno (2002). Vierhaus, Rudolf (ed.). Biographisches Handbuch der Mitglieder des Deutschen Bundestages. 1949–2002 [Biographical Handbook of the Members of the German Bundestag. 1949–2002] (in German). München: De Gruyter - De Gruyter Saur. p. 1715. ISBN 978-3-11-184511-1.
