= Josef Brönner =

German politician (1884–1958)

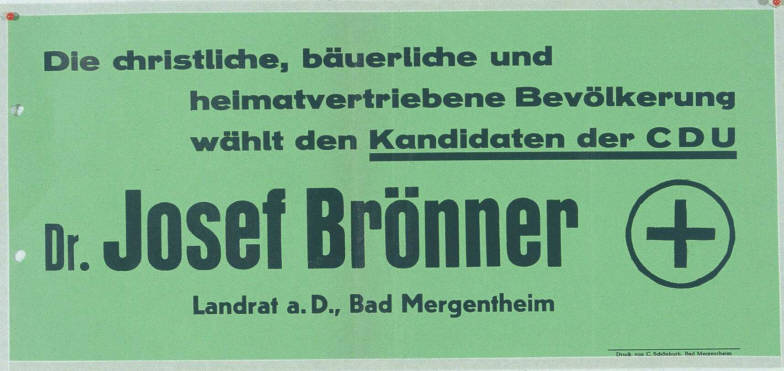
- Candidate poster Josef Brönners for the 1949 federal elections

Member of the Bundestag; for Crailsheim
- In office 7 September 1949 – 21 January 1958
- Preceded by: Constituency established
- Succeeded by: Eugen Maucher

Personal details
- Born: 12 May 1884 Grünsfeld, Germany
- Died: 21 January 1958 (aged 73) Heidelberg, West Germany
- Party: Christian Democratic Union
- Education: University of Würzburg; University of Freiburg

Josef Brönner (12 May 1884 – 21 January 1958) was a German politician of the Christian Democratic Union (CDU) and former member of the German Bundestag.

== Life ==
From 1945 to 1946 he was District Administrator of the Mergentheim district. He was then elected to the freely elected constitutional state assembly of the state of Württemberg-Baden. He was a member of the German Bundestag from the first Bundestag election in 1949 until his death. He was always directly elected in the Crailsheim constituency.

== Literature ==
Herbst, Ludolf; Jahn, Bruno (2002). Vierhaus, Rudolf (ed.). Biographisches Handbuch der Mitglieder des Deutschen Bundestages. 1949–2002 [Biographical Handbook of the Members of the German Bundestag. 1949–2002] (in German). München: De Gruyter - De Gruyter Saur. p. 1715. ISBN 978-3-11-184511-1.
