= Alfred Frenzel =

Czech-German politician and spy

- Born: 18 September 1899; Josefův Důl, Bohemia, Austria-Hungary
- Died: 18 July 1968 (aged 68); Liberec, Czechoslovakia
- Occupation: Member of Parliament of West Germany
- Espionage activity
- Country: West Germany
- Allegiance: Czechoslovakia
- Agency: StB
- Service years: 1956–1960
- Codename: Anna

Alfred Frenzel (18 September 1899 – 18 July 1968) was a West German member of parliament, who was secretly conducting espionage for Czechoslovakia while serving on the Bundestag's Defense Committee. Given the code name Anna by the StB, he passed along classified information to the Communist government in Prague for five years, until his arrest in Bonn on 31 October 1960. He was the most important StB spy during the entire Cold War.

During World War II, after the invasion of his homeland by Nazi Germany, Frenzel worked as an agent for the government in exile in the United Kingdom. After the end of the war, Czechoslovakia became a communist state, and Frenzel emigrated to West Germany.

The new state intelligence service in Czechoslovakia, the StB, examined the files of pre-war intelligence officers, and found information on Frenzel's pre-war activities. When they discovered that Frenzel had been appointed to the parliamentary defence committee responsible for remilitarising West Germany and establishing her place in NATO, the StB leapt on this opportunity to recruit such a highly placed spy.

== Recruitment ==
In April 1956, an old friend of Frenzel's visited him in West Germany. He told Frenzel that he was now working for the Czechoslovak government, and offered Frenzel a job. The old friend added that he would expose Frenzel's political past and criminal record unless he took up the offer. He also said that Frenzel's wife, who was on a trip to Prague, would be in grave danger if he refused. Intimidated, Frenzel agreed to take the job.

He travelled to Vienna, Austria, which was at the time crawling with StB officers due to its proximity to Czechoslovakia, where he was given 1,500 Deutsche Marks and given the code name Anna. In July, he signed a document indicating his links to the StB.

Frenzel was now trapped, and the StB had enough information to blackmail him unless he did exactly as they said.

== Espionage activities ==
Under the close watch of his StB controller, Major Bohumil Molnár, Frenzel returned to West Germany. He began to pass information to Molnár, including a copy of the entire West German defence budget and details of prototype American aircraft.

To reward him for this, the StB gave him a car and a villa back in Czechoslovakia, and also paid Frenzel an enormous salary, placed into a Czechoslovak bank so as not to arouse West German suspicion.

During his time as a spy, the StB's Technical Directorate gave Frenzel many new and experimental devices, including a small film-carrying statue, which, by way of a small explosive charge, would destroy its film unless a special mercury switch was deactivated.

Much of the information the StB gathered from Frenzel was passed on to the KGB.

== Downfall ==
In September 1959, Frenzel was passed on from Molnar (who was promoted to deputy director of the StB for his work with Frenzel) to a new controller, a man operating under the pseudonym Franz Altman. Altman's favourite method of transporting information and film was by way of the containers that would destroy their contents, such as the small statue mentioned before.

These containers would be passed on to Czechoslovak diplomats, who would return the information to Prague. However, in October 1960, the West German counterintelligence organisation, the BfV, became suspicious of Altman, after the tax department reported spending disproportionate to his income.

Altman was arrested just before he boarded a flight to Prague. The arresting BfV agents went through his luggage, and found a talcum powder tin. It was determined to be carrying film, and BfV agents very carefully disassembled it.

Inside was a roll of film, and when the film was developed, photos were found of key West German installations. In the corner of one photo was the number plate of a car. The BfV investigated this, and found that the car belonged to Alfred Frenzel. Along with further evidence, he was arrested and sentenced to 15 years in prison.

He was exchanged for four West German agents five years later.

Frenzel died of natural causes in 1968.
