= Eugen Maucher =

German politician

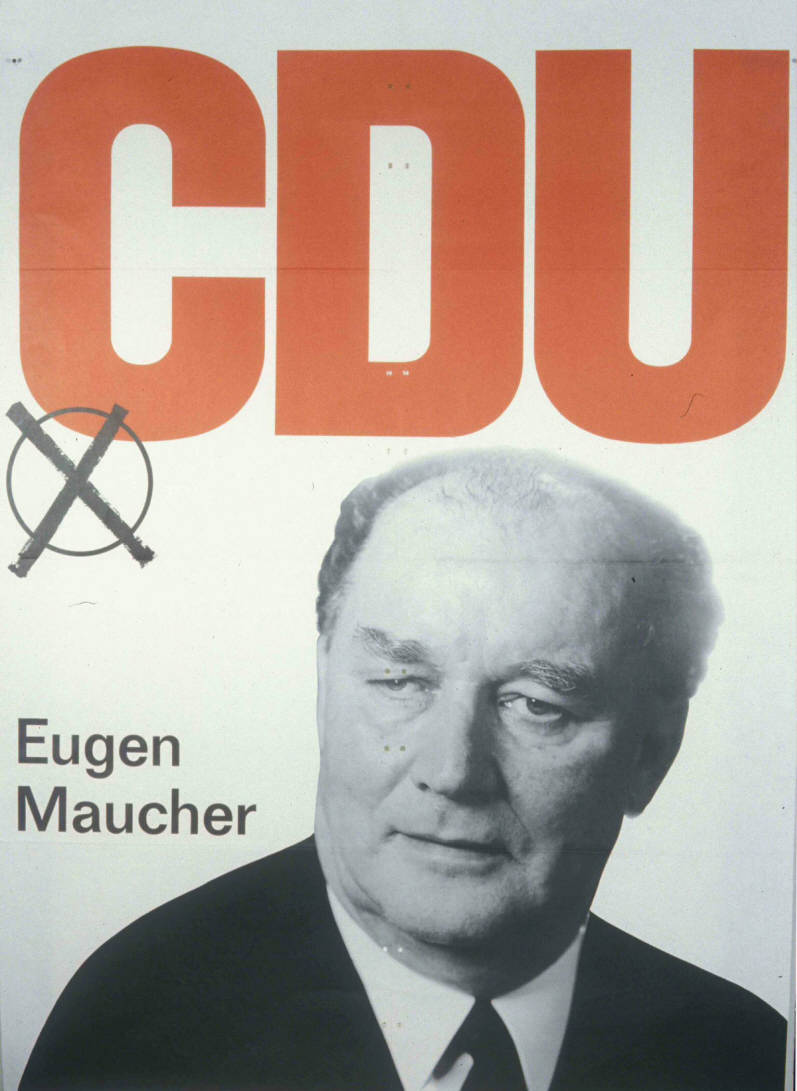
- Candidate poster for the 1969 Bundestag elections

Member of the Bundestag; from Baden-Württemberg
- In office 30 January 1958 – 13 December 1976
- Preceded by: Josef Brönner
- Succeeded by: Isidor Früh
- Constituency: Crailsheim (1958–1961); State list (1961–1965); Biberach (1969–1976)
- In office 6 October 1953 – 16 September 1956
- Preceded by: Multi-member district
- Succeeded by: Pia Kaiser
- Constituency: State list

Member of the; Landtag of Baden-Württemberg; for Biberach
- In office 25 March 1952 – 11 July 1958
- Preceded by: Constituency established
- Succeeded by: Eugen Braun

Member of the; Landtag of Württemberg-Hohenzollern; for Ravensburg
- In office 3 June 1947 – 31 March 1952
- Preceded by: Constituency established
- Succeeded by: Constituency abolished

Personal details
- Born: 16 July 1912 Bad Waldsee, Germany
- Died: 4 December 1991 (aged 79) Biberach an der Riß, Germany
- Party: Christian Democratic Union

Eugen Maucher (16 July 1912 – 4 December 1991) was a German politician of the Christian Democratic Union (CDU) and former member of the German Bundestag.

== Career ==
In 1946 he was co-founder of the CDU Gaisbeuren. In the 1960s he was chairman of the CDU district association of Biberach.

Maucher was a member of the municipal council of Biberach an der Riß from 1951 to 1972. From 1947 to 1952 he was a member of the state parliament for Württemberg-Hohenzollern for the Biberach constituency and then from 1952 to 11 July 1958 of the state parliament of Baden-Württemberg. His successor became Eugen Braun. Maucher was a member of the German Bundestag from 1953 to 16 September 1956 and from 30 January 1958, when he succeeded the late Josef Brönner, until 1976.

== Literature ==
Herbst, Ludolf; Jahn, Bruno (2002). Vierhaus, Rudolf (ed.). Biographisches Handbuch der Mitglieder des Deutschen Bundestages. 1949–2002 [Biographical Handbook of the Members of the German Bundestag. 1949–2002] (in German). München: De Gruyter - De Gruyter Saur. p. 1715. ISBN 978-3-11-184511-1.
