= Walter Eckhardt =

German politician

Walter Eckhardt MdL, MdB, MEP

Member of the European Parliament
- In office 1954–1956

Member of the Bundestag
- In office 1953–1957
- In office 1964–1969

Member of the Parliament of Bavaria
- In office 1950–1954

Personal details
- Born: 23 March 1906
- Died: 1 January 1994 (aged 87)
- Party: All-German Bloc/League of Expellees and Deprived of Rights, Christian Social Union of Bavaria (from 1956)
- Occupation: Lawyer

Walter Eckhardt (23 March 1906 in Bad Homburg vor der Höhe, Hesse-Nassau – 1 January 1994) was a German politician, who represented the All-German Bloc/League of Expellees and Deprived of Rights (GB/BHE) and subsequently the Christian Social Union of Bavaria (CSU). He was a member of the Parliament of Bavaria, a member of the Bundestag and a Member of the European Parliament.

Eckhardt was until 1943 a high-ranking official (Ministerialrat) in the Reichs Ministry of Finance. In 1943 he joined the German army and was captured in early 1945 by the British. He remained in captivity until 1948. Following his repatriation he settled in Munich where he worked as a lawyer and became politically active. In 1949 he was elected president of the German Union and became a member of the directorate of the All-German Bloc/League of Expellees and Deprived of Rights the following year. He was elected to the Parliament of Bavaria in 1950, serving until 1954. He was elected to the Bundestag, serving from 1953 to 1957. In 1955 he left the BHE and joined the CDU/CSU faction in March 1956. Following the resignation of Otto von Feury, Eckhardt, who had not been elected in the first place, rejoined the Bundestag for the rest of the term. Similarly, he only rejoined the Bundestag after the next elections as replacement candidate from 1964 to 1969. Additionally, Eckhardt served as a Member of the European Parliament from 1954 to 1956.

The Walter Eckhardt Award for Contemporary History of the Zeitgeschichtliche Forschungsstelle Ingolstadt is awarded in his memory.

Eckhardt was married with two daughters.

== Publications ==
- Ist der Deutsche Bundestag faul?. In: Finanz Rundschau, 1965, Heft 14, Seiten 311 bis 312
- Vom Beruf unserer Zeit zur Gesetzgebung. Savigny und die Gegenwart. In: Gerhard Thoma, Ursula Niemann: Die Auslegung der Steuergesetze in Wissenschaft und Praxis, Köln, 1965, Seiten 39 bis 55.
