= Otto Freiherr von Feury =

German politician

Otto Freiherr von Feury (27 December 1906 – 27 March 1998) was a German politician, and representative of the Christian Social Union of Bavaria. He was a member of the Landtag of Bavaria between 1950 and 1978.

== Life ==
von Feury was born in Munich, Bavaria in 1906, and studied law and economics at the University of Frankfurt from 1926 to 1931, before working for the Bayerische Vereinsbank. He was elected to the municipal council for Steinhöring in 1945, and served until 1972. He died in Thailing bei Ebersberg in 1998.

== See also ==
- List of Bavarian Christian Social Union politicians
