= Fritz Glahn =

German politician (1899–1977)

Member of the Bundestag
- In office 15 October 1957 – 2 November 1959

Personal details
- Born: 5 March 1899 Dellfeld
- Died: 29 September 1977 (aged 78)
- Party: FDP

Fritz Glahn (5 March 1899 – 29 September 1977) was a German politician of the Free Democratic Party (FDP) and former member of the German Bundestag.

== Life ==
Since 1952, Glahn was a member of the district council of the Palatinate. From 1955 to 1957 he was a member of the Rhineland-Palatinate state parliament and at the same time chairman of the FDP faction there. Glahn was a member of the German Bundestag from 1957 to 2 November 1959.

== Literature ==
Herbst, Ludolf; Jahn, Bruno (2002). Vierhaus, Rudolf (ed.). Biographisches Handbuch der Mitglieder des Deutschen Bundestages. 1949–2002 [Biographical Handbook of the Members of the German Bundestag. 1949–2002] (in German). München: De Gruyter - De Gruyter Saur. p. 1715. ISBN 978-3-11-184511-1.
