= Robert Bach (politician) =

German politician (1901–1976)

Member of the Bundestag
- In office 27 October 1959 – 15 October 1961

Personal details
- Born: 7 December 1901 Limbach
- Died: 10 June 1976 (aged 74)
- Party: SPD

Robert Bach (7 December 1901 – 10 June 1976) was a German politician of the Social Democratic Party (SPD) and former member of the German Bundestag.

== Life ==
Bach had been a member of the SPD since 1920. Bach was a member of the German Bundestag from 27 October 1959, when he succeeded Rudolf Recktenwald as a member of parliament, until 1961. He entered the parliament via the state list of the SPD in Saarland.

== Literature ==
Herbst, Ludolf; Jahn, Bruno (2002). Vierhaus, Rudolf (ed.). Biographisches Handbuch der Mitglieder des Deutschen Bundestages. 1949–2002 [Biographical Handbook of the Members of the German Bundestag. 1949–2002] (in German). München: De Gruyter - De Gruyter Saur. p. 1715. ISBN 978-3-11-184511-1.
