= Robert Geritzmann =

German politician (1893–1969)

Member of the Bundestag
- In office 7 September 1949 – 15 October 1961

Personal details
- Born: 9 February 1893 Essen
- Died: 12 September 1969 (aged 76)
- Party: SPD

Robert Geritzmann (February 9, 1893 – September 12, 1969) was a German politician of the Social Democratic Party (SPD) and member of the German Bundestag.

== Life ==
From 1946 to 1963 he was Lord Mayor of Gelsenkirchen. He also belonged to the German Bundestag from its first election in 1949 to 1961. He was always directly elected in the constituency of Gelsenkirchen.

== Literature ==
Herbst, Ludolf; Jahn, Bruno (2002). Vierhaus, Rudolf (ed.). Biographisches Handbuch der Mitglieder des Deutschen Bundestages. 1949–2002 [Biographical Handbook of the Members of the German Bundestag. 1949–2002] (in German). München: De Gruyter - De Gruyter Saur. p. 1715. ISBN 978-3-11-184511-1.
