= Alfred Gleisner =

German politician (1908–1991)

Member of the Bundestag
- In office 7 September 1949 – 17 March 1959

Personal details
- Born: 19 June 1908 Kamen
- Died: 15 February 1991 (aged 82)
- Party: SPD
- Spouse: Elisabeth Gleisner

Alfred Gleisner (19 June 1908 – 15 February 1991) was a German politician of the Social Democratic Party (SPD) and former member of the German Bundestag.

== Life ==
Gleisner was born on 19 June 1908 to a family of miners in Kamen, a town in North Rhine-Westphalia. After attending school, he trained as a miner.

Gleisner was employed as a miner from 1922 to 1928. He entered the Prussian police force later and became an inspector by 1932. After his career in law enforcement, he was an insurance salesman from 1934 to 1937. He also served as a manager for a food business and factory director before he shifted to politics.

From 1947 to 1950 Gleisner was a member of the state parliament of North Rhine-Westphalia, where he was deputy chairman of the legal and judicial committees.

From the first election in 1949 until his resignation on 17 March 1959 he was a member of the Bundestag. In 1949 he won the direct mandate in the constituency of Unna-Hamm and in the two following elections he entered parliament via the state list of the SPD North Rhine-Westphalia. In the Bundestag he was a full member of the defense committee from 1949 to 1959.

Gleisner was married to Elisabeth Gleisner. He died in 1991.

== Literature ==
Herbst, Ludolf; Jahn, Bruno (2002). Vierhaus, Rudolf (ed.). Biographisches Handbuch der Mitglieder des Deutschen Bundestages. 1949–2002 [Biographical Handbook of the Members of the German Bundestag. 1949–2002] (in German). München: De Gruyter - De Gruyter Saur. p. 1715. ISBN 978-3-11-184511-1.
