= Sachsenberg =

Sachsenberg is a surname. Notable people with the surname include:

- Gotthard Sachsenberg (1891–1961), German World War I fighter ace
- Heinz Sachsenberg (1922–1951), German World War II fighter ace
