= Josef Pöhs =

Austrian test pilot & fighter ace (1912–1943)

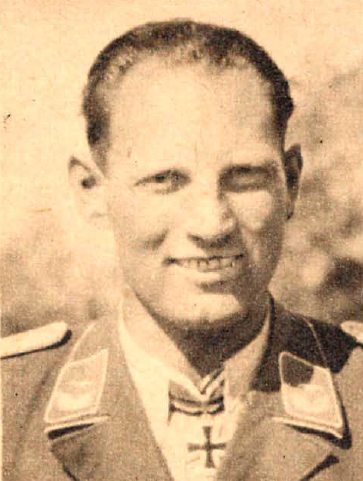
- Born: 14 March 1912; Alt-Kettenhof, Austria-Hungary
- Died: 30 December 1943 (aged 31); Bad Zwischenahn
- Military career
- Allegiance: First Austrian Republic (to 1934); Federal State of Austria (to 1938); Nazi Germany
- Branch: Österreichische Luftstreitkräfte (1934–1938); Luftwaffe (1938–1943)
- Service years: 1934–1943
- Rank: Oberleutnant (first lieutenant)
- Units: JG 54; EKdo 16
- Conflicts: World War II: Invasion of Poland; Battle of France; Battle of Britain; Invasion of Yugoslavia; Operation Barbarossa
- Awards: Knight's Cross of the Iron Cross

Josef "Joschi" Pöhs (14 March 1912 – 30 December 1943) was a Luftwaffe ace and recipient of the Knight's Cross of the Iron Cross during World War II. The Knight's Cross of the Iron Cross, and its variants were the highest awards in the military and paramilitary forces of Nazi Germany during World War II. Pöhs was attached with the Jagdgeschwader 54 fighter wing until spring of 1942 when he transferred to Erprobungskommando 16, a test unit for the new Messerschmitt Me 163 Komet. Pöhs was killed on 30 December 1943 when his Me 163 was damaged on take-off. When the drop away undercarriage bounced off the ground, it hit the underbelly of the aircraft on rebound, damaging a fuel line containing T-Stoff. This caused the engine to shut down and forced Pöhs to try an attempt to glide back to safety. However, he crashed at Bad Zwischenahn succumbing to injuries he sustained due to exposure to T-Stoff. During his career he was credited with 43 aerial victories.

== Early life and career ==
Pöhs was born on 14 March 1912 in Alt-Kettenhof, now part of Schwechat, then in Lower Austria of Austria-Hungary. Pöhs joined the military service of the Austrian Armed Forces in 1934, was trained as a pilot and flew with aerobatics team. Following the Anschluss in March 1938, the forced incorporation of Austria into Nazi Germany, he was transferred to the Luftwaffe (the Nazi German Air Force).

On 1 April, a newly formed I. Gruppe (1st group) of Jagdgeschwader 138 (JG 138—138th Fighter Wing) stationed in Wien-Aspern also referred to as the "Wiener-Jagdgruppe" ("Vienna fighter group") was created, largely staffed with former Austrian Air Force personnel, including Pöhs. On 1 May 1939, his unit I. Gruppe of JG 138 was re-designated and became I. Gruppe of Jagdgeschwader 76 (JG 76—76th Fighter Wing). Initially equipped with the Fiat CR.32, the Gruppe was reequipped with the Messerschmitt Bf 109 E-1 and E-3 in 1939.

== World War II ==
On 26 June 1940, I. Gruppe of JG 76 was moved to the airfield at Waalhaven in the Netherlands and subordinated to Jagdgeschwader 54 (JG 54—54th Fighter Wing). There, the Gruppe was tasked with providing aerial protection over the Dutch coastal area. On 5 July, I./JG 76 was officially integrated into JG 54 and was renamed to II./JG 54 and 2./JG 76 became 5./JG 54. On 25 August, II. Gruppe of JG 54 was placed under the command of Hauptmann Dietrich Hrabak.

On 29 March 1941, II. Gruppe of JG 54 was withdrawn from the English Channel and was ordered to Graz-Thalerhof. There the various squadrons were split up with 5. Staffel being subordinated to III. Gruppe of JG 54 and ordered to Arad in Romania, becoming an element of Fliegerführer Arad. On 6 April, 5. Staffel flew combat missions in the Invasion of Yugoslavia. The next day, the Staffel flew combat air patrols on the Hungarian-Yugoslavian border. On 9 April, II./JG 54 was united again at Kecskemét, Hungary and returned to Deta on 11 April. The Gruppe was withdrawn from this theater on 19 April and ordered to an airfield at Zemun near Belgrade. In this theater of operations, Pöhs claimed his first aerial victory, a Yugoslav Bristol Blenheim bomber near Pécs in Hungary, on 7 April 1941.

=== War against the Soviet Union ===
Following the surrender of the Royal Yugoslav Army on 17 April 1941, JG 54 received orders on 3 May 1941 to turn over all Bf 109-Es so they could receive the new Bf 109-F variant. Transition training was completed at Airfield Stolp-Reitz in Pomerania. Following intensive training, the Geschwader was moved to airfields in Eastern Prussia. II. Gruppe under command of Hauptmann Hrabak was moved to Trakehnen on 20 June 1941. The Wehrmacht launched Operation Barbarossa, the invasion of the Soviet Union, on 22 June with II. Gruppe supporting Army Group North in its strategic goal towards Leningrad.

On 6 August 1941, Pöhs was awarded the Knight's Cross of the Iron Cross (Ritterkreuz des Eisernen Kreuzes) for 28 aerial victories claimed. He received the award together with fellow JG 54 pilot Oberleutnant Hubert Mütherich.

=== Flying the Messerschmitt Me 163 and death ===
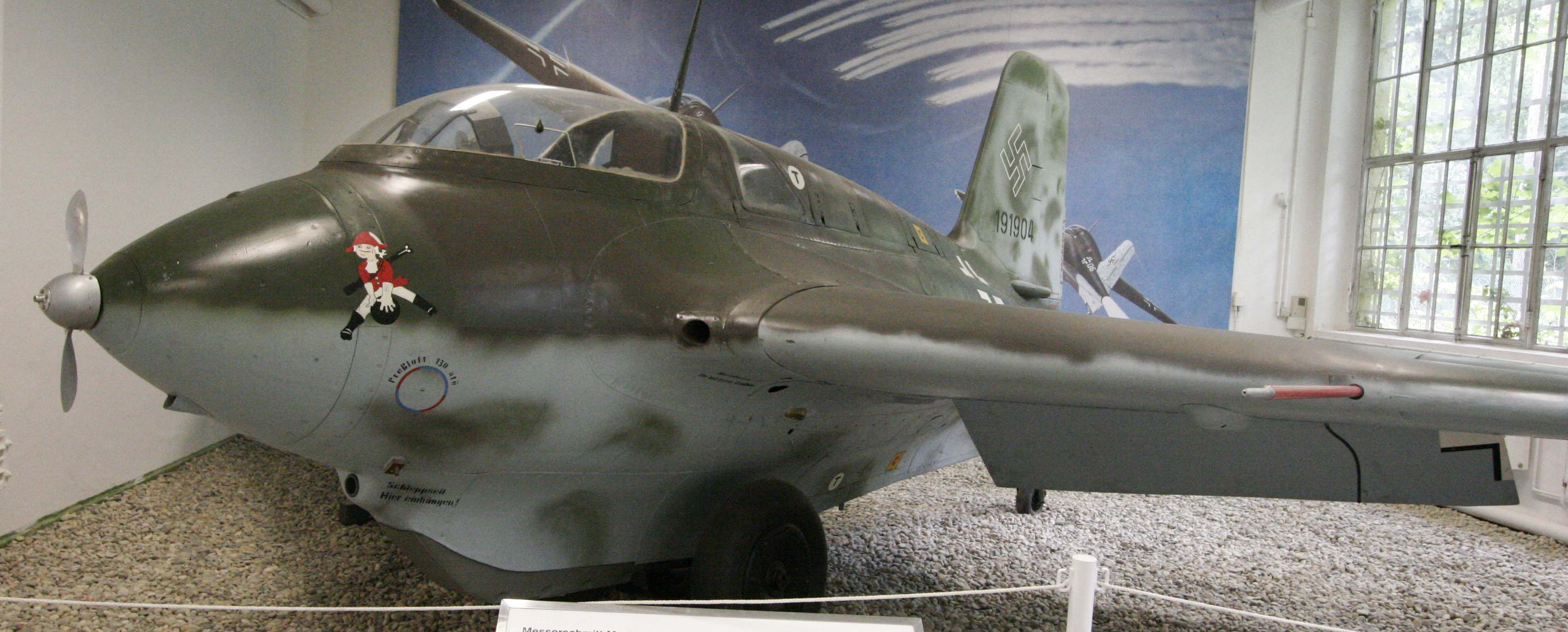
Messerschmitt Me 163 at the Luftwaffenmuseum in Berlin-Gatow

On 30 September 1943, Pöhs was killed in a flying accident at the Bad Zwischenahn Airfield. Engine failure of his Messerschmitt Me 163 A V8 CD+IM rocket-powered aircraft during takeoff forced him to make an emergency landing. At low altitude, he made a steep turn back to the airfield. Attempting to avoid the antenna of the radio station, the aircraft's wing clipped the tower resulting in an explosion of the aircraft. Later investigations revealed that the drop-off takeoff wheels had bounced back from the ground, hitting the aircraft and damaged the T-Stoff fuel line.

== Summary of military career ==
=== Aerial victory claims ===
According to Obermaier, Pöhs was credited with 43 aerial victories claimed in approximately 300 combat missions. Mathews and Foreman, authors of Luftwaffe Aces — Biographies and Victory Claims, researched the German Federal Archives and found records for 41 aerial victory claims, plus one further unconfirmed claim. This number includes seven on the Western Front and 34 on the Eastern Front of World War II.

Chronicle of aerial victories
This and the # (hash mark) indicates those aerial victories listed by Prien, Stemmer, Rodeike and Bock without an explicit sequence number.
| Claim | Date | Time | Type | Location | Claim | Date | Time | Type | Location |
– 2. Staffel of Jagdgeschwader 76 – Battle of France — 10 May – 25 June 1940
| # (Note: According to Mathews and Foreman, this claim is unconfirmed.) | 14 May 1940 | — | Curtiss | | # | 20 May 1940 | 18:50 | Battle | |
– 5. Staffel of Jagdgeschwader 54 – At the Channel and over England — 26 June 1940 – 29 March 1941
| # | 12 August 1940 | 18:40 | Spitfire | | # | 28 August 1940 | 17:30 | Spitfire | southwest of Dover |
According to Prien, Stemmer, Rodeike and Bock, Pöhs claimed one undocumented aerial victory in August 1940. This claim is not listed by Mathews and Foreman.
| 6 | 27 September 1940 | 10:16 | Spitfire | | 7 | 27 September 1940 | 10:20 | Spitfire | |
– 5. Staffel of Jagdgeschwader 54 – Balkan Campaign — 29 March – 3 May 1941
| 8 | 7 April 1941 | 12:02 | Blenheim | Fünfkirchen | 9 | 7 April 1941 | 14:35 | Hurricane | |
– 5. Staffel of Jagdgeschwader 54 – Operation Barbarossa – 22 June – 5 December 1941
| 10 | 22 June 1941 | 17:15 | SB-2 | | 27 | 31 July 1941 | 20:10 | I-18 (MiG-1) | |
| 11 | 22 June 1941 | 17:20 | SB-2 | | 28 | 4 August 1941 | 12:25 | I-18 (MiG-1) | |
| 12 | 29 June 1941 | 14:57 | I-15 | Dünaburg | 29 | 11 August 1941 | 06:12 | I-16 | northeast of Poretschje |
| 13 | 29 June 1941 | 15:10 | I-15 | Dünaburg | 30 | 11 August 1941 | 15:35 | I-16 | |
| 14 | 30 June 1941 | 17:15 | DB-3 | | 31 | 11 August 1941 | 19:17 | DB-3 | |
| 15 | 2 July 1941 | 19:25 | DB-3 | | 32 | 12 August 1941 | 19:45 | I-18 (MiG-1) | |
| 16 | 6 July 1941 | 20:45 | DB-3 | | 33 | 13 August 1941 | 09:16 | I-18 (MiG-1) | |
| 17 | 7 July 1941 | 10:56 | DB-3 | | 34 | 17 August 1941 | 19:00 | Pe-2 | |
| 18 | 7 July 1941 | 19:40 | DB-3 | Ostrov/Dünaburg | 35 | 18 August 1941 | 12:40 | I-18 (MiG-1) | |
| 19 | 13 July 1941 | 20:34 | DB-3 | | 36 | 20 August 1941 | 07:15 | I-153 | |
| 20 | 13 July 1941 | 20:35 | DB-3 | | 37 | 25 August 1941 | 13:05 | I-16 | |
| 21 | 17 July 1941 | 16:50 | DB-3 | | 38 | 27 August 1941 | 15:10 | I-18 (MiG-1) | |
| 22 | 18 July 1941 | 04:32 | I-16 | | 39 | 6 September 1941 | 15:55 | I-16 | |
| 23 | 18 July 1941 | 04:45 | I-16 | | 40 | 7 September 1941 | 16:45 | I-18 (MiG-1) | |
| 24 | 18 July 1941 | 16:25 | I-18 (MiG-1) | | 41 | 9 September 1941 | 16:15 | I-153 | Leningrad |
| 25 | 22 July 1941 | 18:15 | I-18 (MiG-1) | southwest of Krasnoye Selo | 42 | 10 September 1941 | 16:05 | I-18 (MiG-1) | |
| 26 | 24 July 1941 | 17:55 | I-18 (MiG-1) | | 43 | 12 September 1941 | 07:05 | I-18 (MiG-1) | |

=== Awards ===
- Iron Cross (1939) 2nd and 1st Class
- Honor Goblet of the Luftwaffe (9 August 1941)
- Knight's Cross of the Iron Cross on 6 August 1941 as Leutnant of the Reserves and pilot in the 5./Jagdgeschwader 54 (Note: According to Scherzer as Leutnant (war officer) and pilot in the II./Jagdgeschwader 54.)
- German Cross in Gold on 9 December 1941 as Oberleutnant in the II./Jagdgeschwader 54
