= Carlo Graaff =

German politician (1914–1975)

Member of the Bundestag; from Lower Saxony
- In office 19 October 1965 – 9 December 1975
- Preceded by: Multi-member district
- Succeeded by: Friedrich Kreibaum
- Constituency: State list
- In office 4 July 1955 – 8 May 1959
- Preceded by: Robert Dannemann
- Succeeded by: Herwart Miessner
- Constituency: Oldenburg (1955–1957); State list (1957–1959)

Minister of Economic Affairs and Transport of Lower Saxony
- In office 12 May 1959 – 19 May 1965
- Minister-President: Hinrich Wilhelm Kopf; Georg Diederichs
- Preceded by: Alfred Kubel
- Succeeded by: Karl Möller

Member of the Landtag of Lower Saxony
- In office 12 June 1963 – 26 June 1963
- Preceded by: Multi-member district
- Succeeded by: Alfred Cohrs
- Constituency: State list

Personal details
- Born: 22 July 1914 Haaren, Germany
- Died: 9 December 1975 (aged 61) Braunlage, West Germany
- Party: Free Democratic Party
- Education: RWTH Aachen University; TU Berlin

Carlo Graaff (22 July 1914 – 8 December 1975) was a German politician of the Free Democratic Party (FDP) and former member of the German Bundestag.

== Political career ==
Graaff was a member of the German Bundestag from 4 July 1955, when he succeeded Robert Dannemann, until 8 May 1959 and from 1965 until his death in 1975. From 15 June 1972 until the end of the legislative period, he was Chairman of the Bundestag's Economics Committee. From the 1963 state elections until his resignation on 26 June 1963, he was a member of parliament in Lower Saxony (fifth term).

== Literature ==
Herbst, Ludolf; Jahn, Bruno (2002). Vierhaus, Rudolf (ed.). Biographisches Handbuch der Mitglieder des Deutschen Bundestages. 1949–2002 [Biographical Handbook of the Members of the German Bundestag. 1949–2002] (in German). München: De Gruyter - De Gruyter Saur. p. 1715. ISBN 978-3-11-184511-1.
