= Stephan Albani =

German politician

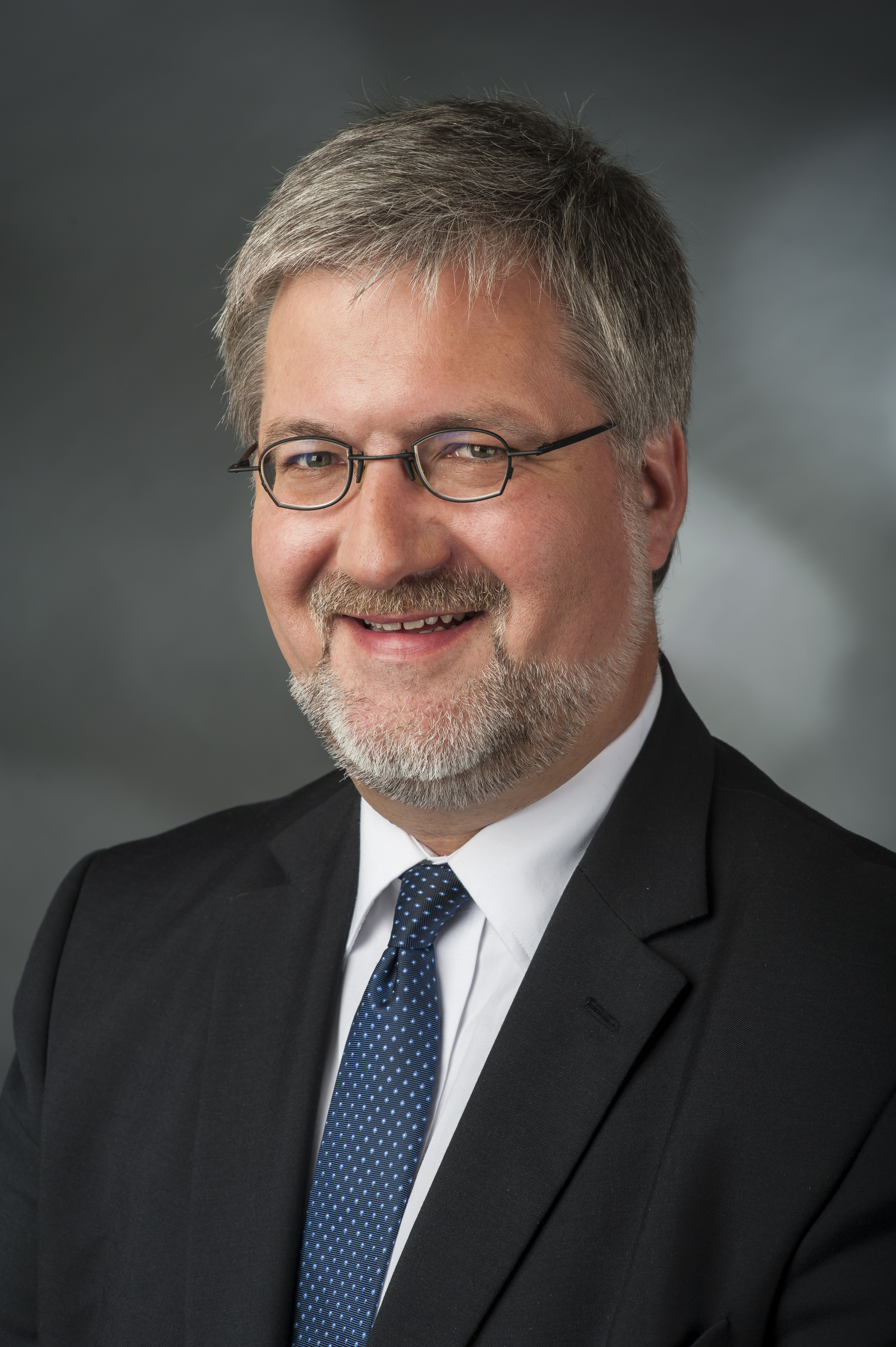
- Albani in 2014

Member of the Bundestag
- Incumbent
- Assumed office 22 October 2013

Personal details
- Born: 3 March 1968 (age 58) Göttingen, West Germany
- Party: Christian Democratic Union
- Education: University of Göttingen
- Occupation: Physicist

Stephan Albani (born 3 June 1968 in Göttingen) is a German politician of the Christian Democratic Union (CDU) who has been a member of the German Bundestag since the federal election in 2013.

== Early life and education ==
Albani was born in Göttingen, and graduated from high school in 1987 in Norderstedt. From 1989 to 1994 he studied physics at the Georg-August-Universität Göttingen with a degree as Diplomphysiker.

== Career in the private sector ==
Albani was a managing partner of Hörzentrum (Hearing Center) GmbH Oldenburg from 1996 and managing director of HörTech gGmbH Oldenburg from 2001. The shareholders of the HörTech GmbH competence centre are the University of Oldenburg and Hörzentrum Oldenburg GmbH. He relinquished this position in 2018.

He is a member of the Federal Association for Economic Development and Foreign Trade (BWA EBD) and was Vice-President from 2007 to 2021. and became head of the Innovation Commission in Berlin in 2007. In the same year, Albani became managing director of the Auditory Valley excellence initiative cluster and held this position until 2018. In 2008, the state initiative Innovatives Niedersachsen - Zukunft schmieden (Innovative Lower Saxony - Forging the Future) entrusted him with the deputy management of the Health and Nutrition working group in Hanover. In the same year, he became an authorised signatory of the Medical Care Centre at the Evangelical Hospital in Oldenburg.

In 2010, Lower Saxony's State Ministry of Economic Affairs appointed Albani to the advisory board of the Lower Saxony State Initiative LifeSciences in Hanover, where he remained until he became a member of the Bundestag.

From 2011 to 2013, Albani headed the health working group of the state initiative Innovatives Niedersachsen - Zukunft schmieden of Lower Saxony's State Ministry of Economic Affairs in Hanover. As part of the Cluster of Excellence Hearing4All, he took over the Translational Research Centre (TRC) management. The background to this was the successful application by the University of Oldenburg, with Hannover Medical School and Leibniz University Hannover, for the Cluster of Excellence Hearing4All in June 2012. The TRC is tasked with translating the results of the cluster's research work into products. He headed the programme until 2018.

In 2020, Albani gave lectures on thoracic surgery and lung cancer for AstraZeneca, earning between 1,000 and 3,500 euros.

== Political career ==
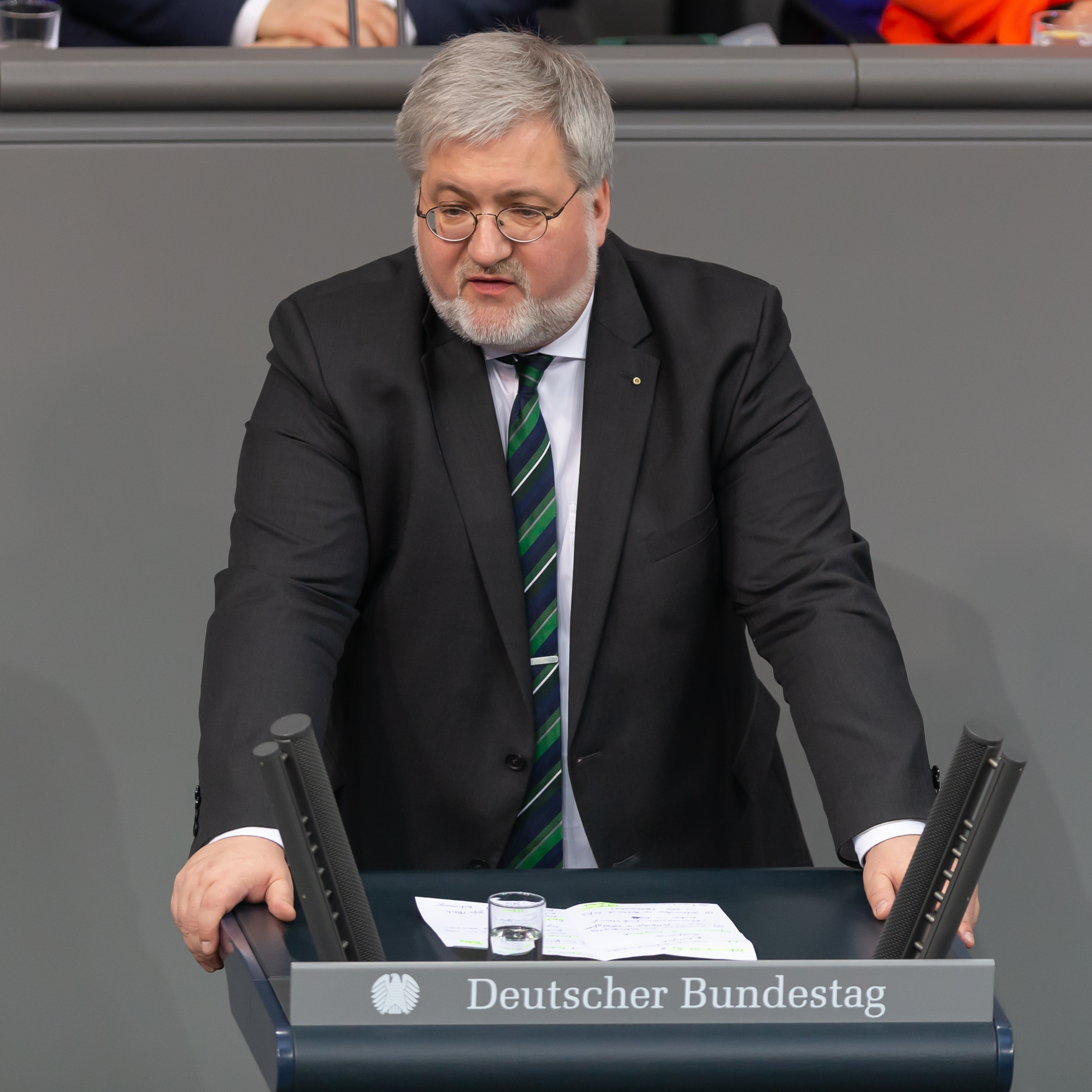
Albani in the plenum of the German Bundestag

Albani is deputy chairman of the Ammerland CDU district association and the Bad Zwischenahn CDU town association. He became a member of the CDU Economic Council in 2009 and was involved in the Innovation and Growth working group in Berlin.

In July 2012, Albani was nominated by the CDU as a direct candidate for the parliamentary constituency of Oldenburg – Ammerland, but missed out on the direct mandate with 36.8% of the first votes. Nevertheless, he entered the Bundestag in the 2013 federal election in 6th place on the CDU state list for Lower Saxony. During the 18th legislative period, he was a full member of the Committee on Education, Research and Technology Assessment and a deputy member of the Committee on Health. He was also Chairman of the German-South-East European Parliamentary Group from 2016 to 2017.

In 2014, Albani was appointed to the CDU's Federal Committee on Education, Research and Innovation, having already spent several years as head of the 'Science, Culture, Church' committee of the CDU's Oldenburg regional association. He is also involved in the two specialised committees' Science and Culture' and 'Health' of the CDU Lower Saxony. Since 2018, he has been an assessor on the federal board of the Mittelstands- und Wirtschaftsunion.

In the 2017 Bundestag election, he again missed out on the direct mandate in his constituency with 30.2% of the first votes. He again entered the Bundestag via the sixth place on the Lower Saxony CDU list. In the 19th legislative period, he was a full member of the Study Commission on Vocational Training in the Digital World of Work and the Committee on Education, Research and Technology Assessment. He was also a deputy member of the Committee on Health, the Committee on Labour and Social Affairs and the Subcommittee on Global Health.

In addition to his committee assignments, Albani served as chairman of the German-Irish Parliamentary Friendship Group from 2017 to 2021. He was also a member of the SADC parliamentary group, the Nordic parliamentary group and the CDU/CSU parliamentary group's Stephanus Circle.

In the 2021 Bundestag elections, he missed out on a direct mandate with 19.9% of the first votes in his constituency and entered parliament in 11th place on the Lower Saxony state list. In the 20th legislative period, he is the spokesperson for his parliamentary group on the Committee on Education, Research and Technology Assessment and a full member of the Subcommittee on Global Health. He is also a deputy member of the Committee on Health and Chairman of the German-Egyptian Parliamentary Group. Albani is also a member of the Parliamentary Network to Combat Tuberculosis and was a full member of the Parliamentary Monitoring Committee on the COVID-19 pandemic in 2021.

== Political positions ==
Albani is one of his parliamentary group's 75 MPs who voted against the party line and in favour of same-sex marriage in July 2017.

== Controversy ==
Albani earned between 1,000 and 7,000 euros per month from his sideline activities at Hörzentrum Oldenburg and HörTech. A Transparency study identified a potential conflict of interest between Albani's activities and reporting on 'accelerating the transfer of research results and innovations into healthcare'. On 17 August 2017, the Nordwest-Zeitung reported on Albani's activities. According to Martin Reyher from abgeordnetenwatch.de, it was 'quite obvious' that Albani, as a member of the Committee on Health and the Committee on Education, Research and Technology Assessment of the German Bundestag, was co-deciding on taxpayers' money, from which he potentially benefited through his sideline activities as managing director of federally funded companies. Lobbycontrol also described Albani's sideline activities as a 'clear case of bias'. In an interview with the newspaper, Albani stated that he 'only assisted the two companies in an advisory capacity for 3 to 4 hours a week' and had thus recorded gross additional income of just under €42,000 in 2016. The continuation of the companies alongside his parliamentary mandate is an economic necessity: if he were to leave the Bundestag, 'then I would fall into a bottomless pit'. Albani was also criticised in letters to the editor of the Nordwest-Zeitung, and Albani responded to the accusations on his website, where he once again emphasised that it was necessary to continue running the companies in the event of his resignation from the Bundestag. He rejected the accusation of bias in the committee's work. In 2018, he ended all his economic activities. In 2020, he received remuneration of between 3,500 and 7,000 euros for consultancy work for HörTech gGmbH.

== Memberships ==
Albani was Vice President of the Federal Association for Economic Development and Foreign Trade (BWA) until 2021, which, according to research by the ARD political magazine Kontraste and Die Zeit, maintains lobbying contacts with individuals and organisations with close ties to Russian oligarch Yevgeny Prigozhin. He has been Co-Chairman of the European TB Caucus since 2015. He is a board member of the GeWiNet competence centre for the healthcare industry. He is a member of the Rotary Club, Bundeswehr-Sozialwerk, and the nonpartisan Europa-Union Deutschland, which is committed to a federal Europe and the European unification process. He is also a member of the Freundeskreis Korvette Oldenburg, which aims to maintain the sponsorship of the German Navy ship of the same name.

== Other activities ==
- German National Association for Student Affairs, Ex-Officio Member of the Board of Trustees (since 2022)
- Helmholtz Association of German Research Centres, Ex-Officio Member of the Senate (since 2022)
- Eurasian Parliamentary Group on TB (EPGTB), Co-Chairman (since 2016)
- EWE Baskets Oldenburg, Member of the Advisory Board
- German Foundation for World Population (DSW), Member of the Parliamentary Advisory Board
- German Military Reserve Association, Member
- Bundeswehr-Sozialwerk, Member
- Oldenburg Institute for Information Technology (OFFIS), Member of the Supervisory Board
- German Medical Technology Alliance (GMTA), Member of the Board (2004-2013)

== Personal life ==
Albani is married, Protestant, has three children and lives in Petersfehn in Ammerland, where he is deputy chairman of his party.
