= Thomas Kossendey =

Former member of the Bundestag

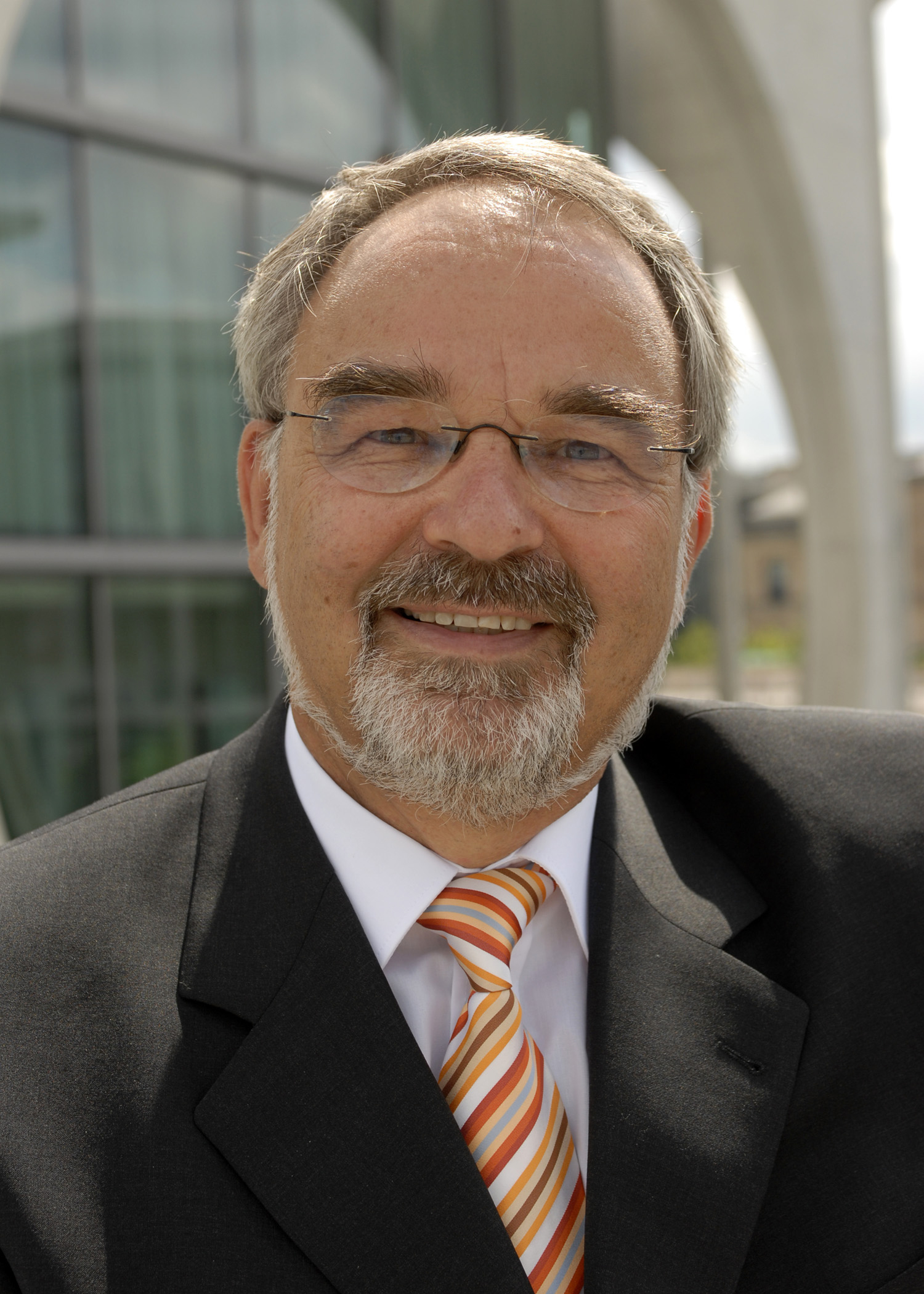
- Kossendey in 2013

Parliamentary State Secretary for the Minister of Defence
- In office 27 October 2006 – 22 October 2013
- Minister: Franz Josef Jung; Karl-Theodor zu Guttenberg; Thomas de Maizière
- Preceded by: Friedbert Pflüger
- Succeeded by: Markus Grübel

Member of the Bundestag; from Lower Saxony
- In office 18 February 1987 – 22 October 2013
- Preceded by: Multi-member district
- Succeeded by: Dennis Rohde
- Constituency: State list (1987–2009); Oldenburg – Ammerland (2009–2013)

Personal details
- Born: 4 March 1948 (age 78) Ammerland, West Germany
- Party: Christian Democratic Union
- Spouse: Claudia Kossendey
- Children: Jonas Kossendey
- Education: University of Cologne; University of Münster
- Committees: Committee for Defence

Thomas Kossendey (born 4 March 1948) is a German politician, lawyer, and former member of the Bundestag. A member of the Christian Democratic Union (CDU), he was elected to the Bundestag in 1987 and served until 2013. Kossendey was elected via the state list of Lower Saxony until 2009, when he was elected directly to the constituency of Oldenburg – Ammerland. He served as the Parliamentary State Secretary to the Federal Minister of Defence between 2006 and 2013.

== Early life and education ==
Thomas Kossendey was born in Ammerland on 4 March 1948. He graduated from gymnasium school in 1967.

Kossendey served in the Bundeswehr for 18 months following his graduation from high school and completed basic military training. After his military service, Kossendey studied political science and law at the University of Cologne and the University of Münster.

== Local politics ==
Between 1974 and 1980, Kossendey was the chairman of the Young Union Oldenburg State Association. He also served as chairman of the CDU's district association in Ammerland. In 1979, Kossendey passed the second Staatsexamen and joined the Lower Saxony civil service in 1980. He served as head of the minister's office in the Lower Saxony Ministry of Education. While part of the Ammerland CDU association, his attempt to become the CDU candidate for the Oldenburg – Ammerland constituency created tension with the Oldenburg CDU association. While he lost the internal selection process to the Oldenburg candidate in 1983, he won in 1987. This led to increased bitterness between the two associations, and the Oldenburg CDU association attempted to nominate someone to replace Kossendey in 1990, although this was unsuccessful.

== Bundestag ==
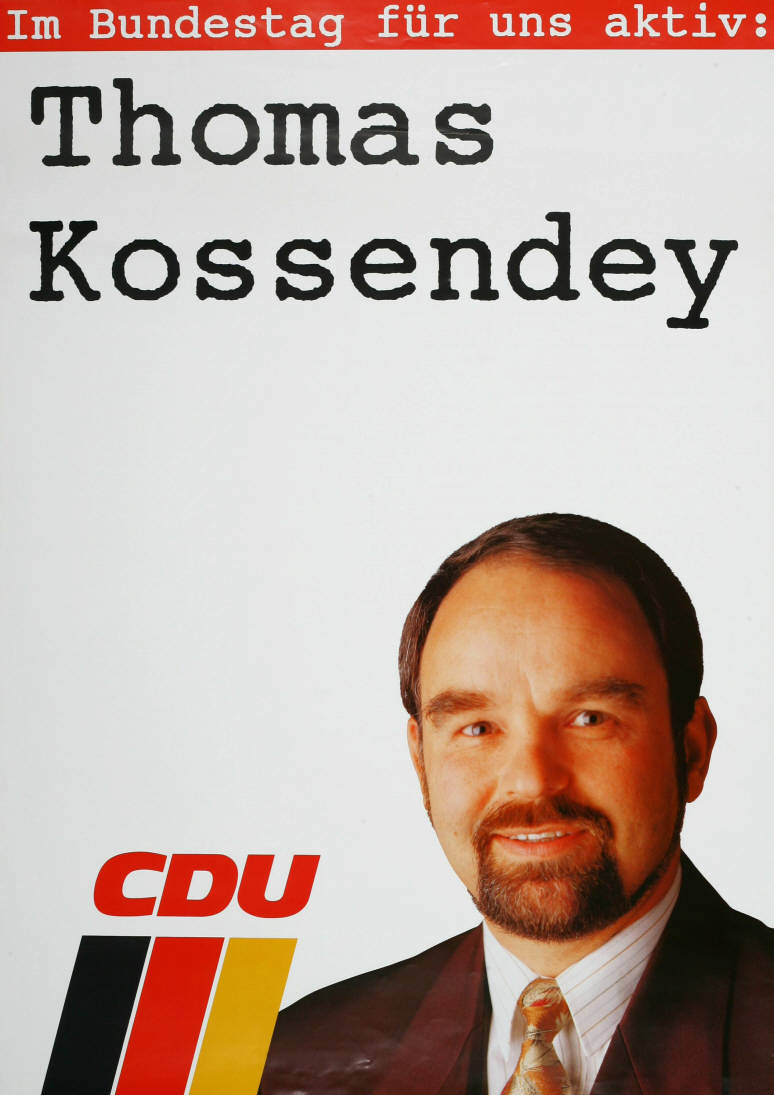
Kossendey on a CDU campaign poster from 1990.

In 1987, Kossendey was elected to the Bundestag for the CDU. He was elected via the state list in every election until 2009, when he won the direct mandate for his constituency.

He was a member of the Defense Committee between 1987 and 2006, and was its deputy chairman from 1998 onwards. Kossendey was the chairman of the German–Turkish Parliamentary Group between 2006 and 2009, and focuses extensively on German–Turkish relations. From 2006 until his retirement in 2013, he served as the Parliamentary State Secretary to the Minister of Defence.

In 2013, Kossendey retired from the Bundestag after 27 years.

== Post-Bundestag career ==
From 2013 to 2017, he was the spokesperson for the Advisory Board on Leadership Principles in the German army. He also served as chairman of the Oldenburg Landscaping Association.

== Personal life ==
Kossendey is married to his wife Claudia and has one son, Jonas. He is Catholic. His hobbies include tennis and gardening.
