= Bad Zwischenahn Airfield =

Luftwaffe aviation in Lower Saxony

Bad Zwischenahn Airfield Land-und Seefliegerhorst Zwischenahn
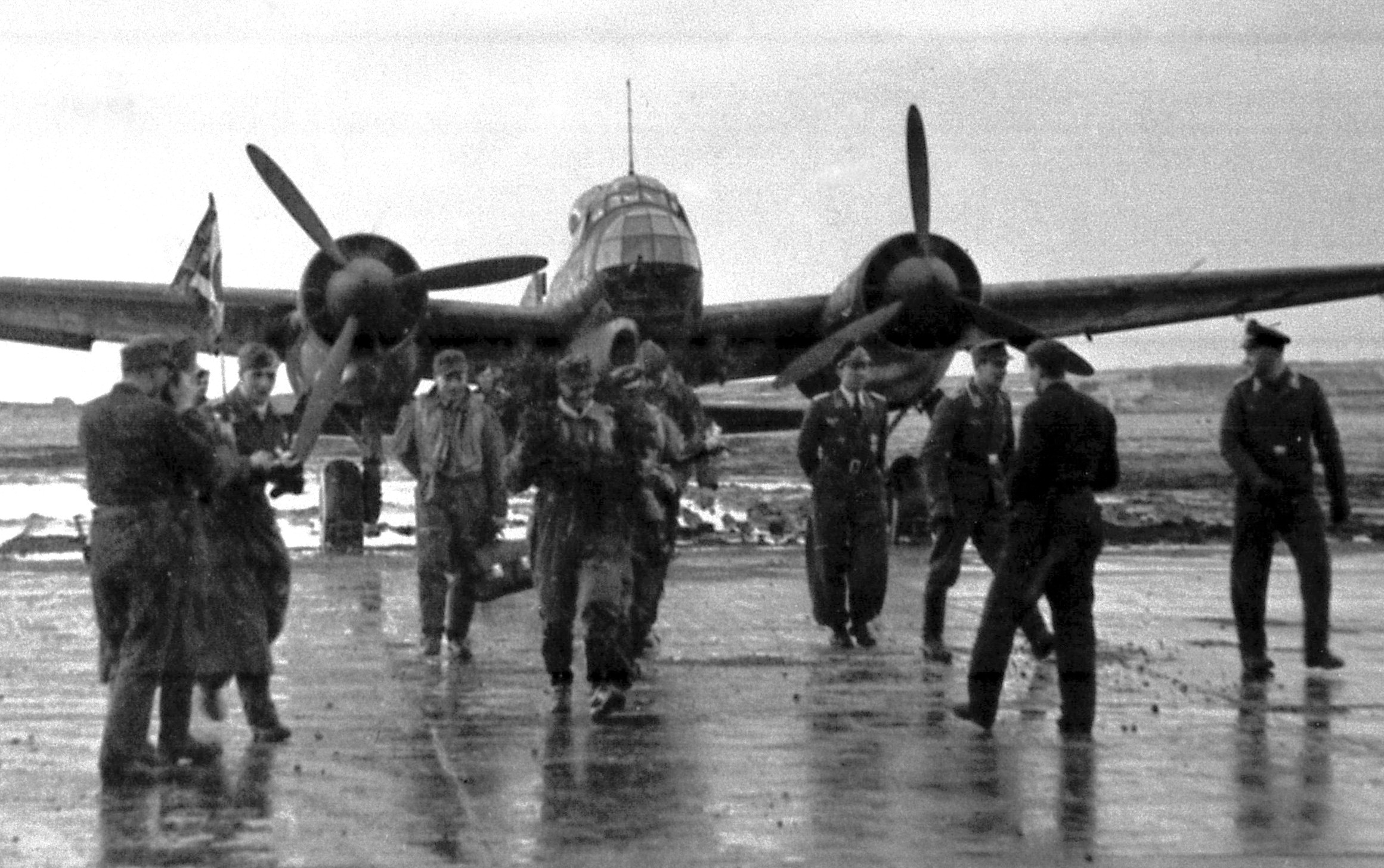
- Junkers Ju-88 bomber group
- IATA: none; ICAO: none

Summary
- Airport type: Defunct
- Owner: Luftwaffe
- Operator: Reichsluftfahrtministerium (National Air Ministry)
- Serves: Zwischenahn
- Location: Bad Zwischenahn, Lower Saxony, Germany
- Coordinates: 53°12′27″N 7°59′13″E

Map
- Location in Germany

Runways
Direction	Length		Surface
Direction	ft	m	Surface
00/00	4,593	1,400x90	Asphalt
00/00	3,937	1,200x80	Asphalt
00/00			Asphalt

Bad Zwischenahn Airfield (also known as Land-und Seefliegerhorst Zwischenahn) was an airfield in northwestern Germany (Lower Saxony).

== History ==
Built in 1936 near Lake Zwischenahn, the airfield initially served as a civilian facility with an 800-meter grass runway. It supported target towing operations for the armed forces under the supervision of the Reichsluftfahrtministerium (Ministry of Aviation). The Luftwaffe assumed control of the airfield in 1939 and expanded its infrastructure. This included the addition of three asphalt runways, the largest being 1,400 meters long, and the construction of mooring facilities for floatplanes on the lake, called the E-Hafen. The expanded base was renamed Seefliegerhorst Zwischenahn and codenamed “Adlerhorst” (Eagle's Nest).

=== World War II ===
During World War II, the airfield held various military units. In May 1940, Heinkel He 59 aircraft launched missions from the E-Hafen during the German invasion of the Netherlands. Later that year, bomber groups operating Junkers Ju-88s conducted attacks on Britain.

From 1941 onwards, Wettererkundungsstaffel 1 used the base for weather reconnaissance over the North Sea and North Atlantic, remaining active until the war's end. Between 1943 and 1944, other units, including Kampfgeschwader 30 and 40, operated from Zwischenahn, also flying Ju 88 bombers.

One of the airfield's most notable roles began in 1943, when it became a testing ground for the Messerschmitt Me 163 Komet, a groundbreaking rocket-powered fighter capable of exceeding 1,000 km/h. These tests were conducted by Erprobungskommando 16, which later merged into Jagdgeschwader 400 and relocated in late 1944.

In addition to testing new aircraft, the airfield supported missions involving the Heinkel He 111 bombers equipped to carry and launch V-1 flying bombs. These missions represented early air-launched cruise missile operations, conducted until early 1945.

Units:

Kampfgeschwader (KG)

Hosted Kampfgeschwader (KG) units like III./KG4 during the Battle of Britain (1940) and KG6 in 1942 for aircraft transitions.

Erprobungskommando 16 (EK 16)

Erprobungskommando 16 (EK 16) used the airfield from 1943 to 1944 to test and develop the Me 163 Komet, including towing operations with Messerschmitt Bf 110 aircraft.

== Post-War ==
After its capture by Canadian troops in May 1945, Bad Zwischenahn was used as a logistical and administrative hub by the 2nd Canadian Corps. The airfield supported occupation duties and the demobilization of German military forces.

After World War II, Bad Zwischenahn Airfield was heavily damaged by Allied airstrikes, with two of its runways and most of its hangars destroyed. Only one hangar and part of the lakeside runway were left intact. The site briefly served the Canadian Army, which repaired some of the facilities for their use during the postwar occupation. By 1946, the site became a base for the British Army as part of the British Army of the Rhine (BAOR). Units like the 7th Armoured Division(“Desert Rats”) and 52nd (Lowland) Infantry Division were stationed in the area, using existing facilities for barracks and command centers. The infrastructure was adapted to meet British military needs, including storage, maintenance and housing. Eventually, the airfield was abandoned for aviation purposes. The British Royal Air Force later converted the site into a hospital (RAF Hospital Rostrup) in the 1950s.

== Closure ==
The airfield suffered multiple Allied airstrikes, with the final attack in March 1945 rendering it inoperable. Canadian troops captured the site in May 1945. much of the airfield infrastructure was destroyed or repurposed. The site briefly served the Canadian Army before being converted into a golf course and other recreational facilities. Today, only traces of the airfield's original layout remain, and the parts of the runways now covered by the forest.

Some original buildings, such as the former fire brigade, and vehicle facilities still partially exist. The airfield area is mainly inaccessible due to private ownership, but can be viewed from nearby public roads.
