= Zwischenahner Meer =

Lake in Ammerland, Lower Saxony, Germany

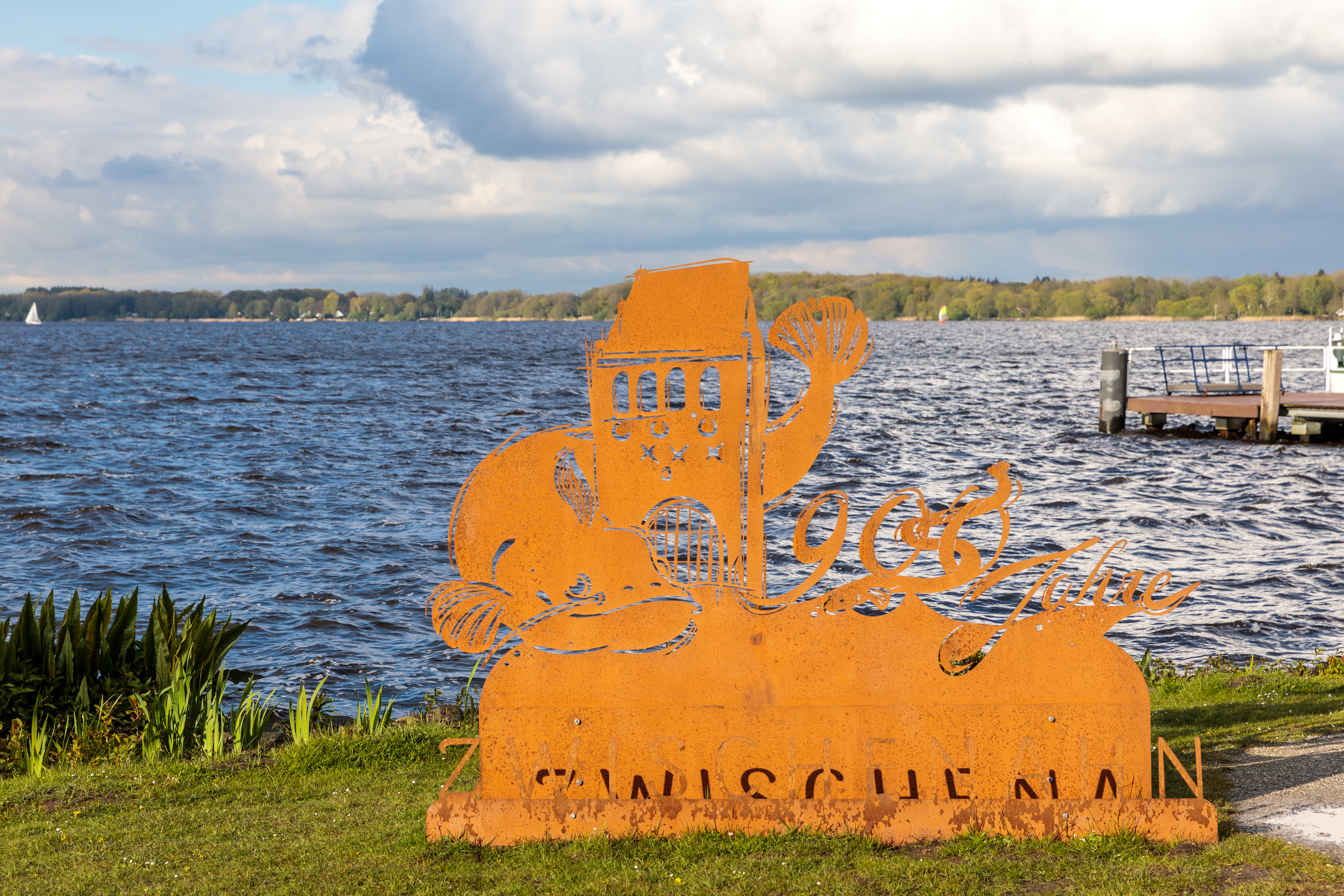

- Location within Germany
- Location: Ammerland, Lower Saxony
- Coordinates: 53°11′52″N 8°1′2″E
- Primary inflows: Auebach, Halfsteder Bäke, Elmendorfer Bäke
- Primary outflows: Aue, Speckener Bäke
- Basin countries: Germany
- Surface area: 5.5 km^{2} (2.1 sq mi)
- Max. depth: 6 m (20 ft)
- Surface elevation: c. 5 m (16 ft)

Zwischenahner Meer is a lake in Ammerland, Lower Saxony, Germany. It is at an elevation of approximately 5 metres (16 ft), and has a surface area of 550 hectares (1,400 acres). The town of Bad Zwischenahn is located on the southern end of the lake, Rostrup on the western end, and Dreibergen on the northern end. It is the third largest lake in Lower Saxony.

The lake is around 6 metres (20 ft) deep at its deepest point, and has an average depth of 3 metres (9.8 ft).

It emerged 11,000 years ago, after the collapse of a salt dome.

The Zwischenahner Meer is navigable, and regular ferry services began in 1874. It has also been home to the White Fleet (Weiße Flotte) since 1987. The three ships run on regularly scheduled routes between the different landing piers along the lakeside. The piers are located in Bad Zwischenahn, Rostrup, and Dreibergen. Sailing, boating, and other recreational water sports are also popular past times.

The lake has made Bad Zwischenahn a very popular tourist destination, as the town hosts numerous spa facilities.
