= Robert Dannemann =

German politician (1902–1965)

Member of the Bundestag; for Oldenburg
- In office 7 September 1949 – 1 July 1955
- Preceded by: Constituency established
- Succeeded by: Carlo Graaff

Personal details
- Born: 6 February 1902 Tungeln, Germany
- Died: 28 September 1965 (aged 63) London, England
- Party: Free Democratic Party
- Education: University of Göttingen; Humboldt University of Berlin; Kiel University

Robert Dannemann (6 February 1902 – 28 September 1965) was a German politician of the Free Democratic Party (FDP) and former member of the German Bundestag.

== Life ==
In the first federal election in 1949, he was directly elected to parliament for the FDP in the Oldenburg - Ammerland constituency. He also won the constituency in 1953.

== Literature ==
Herbst, Ludolf; Jahn, Bruno (2002). Vierhaus, Rudolf (ed.). Biographisches Handbuch der Mitglieder des Deutschen Bundestages. 1949–2002 [Biographical Handbook of the Members of the German Bundestag. 1949–2002] (in German). München: De Gruyter - De Gruyter Saur. p. 1715. ISBN 978-3-11-184511-1.
