= Richard Friese =

German painter (1854–1918)

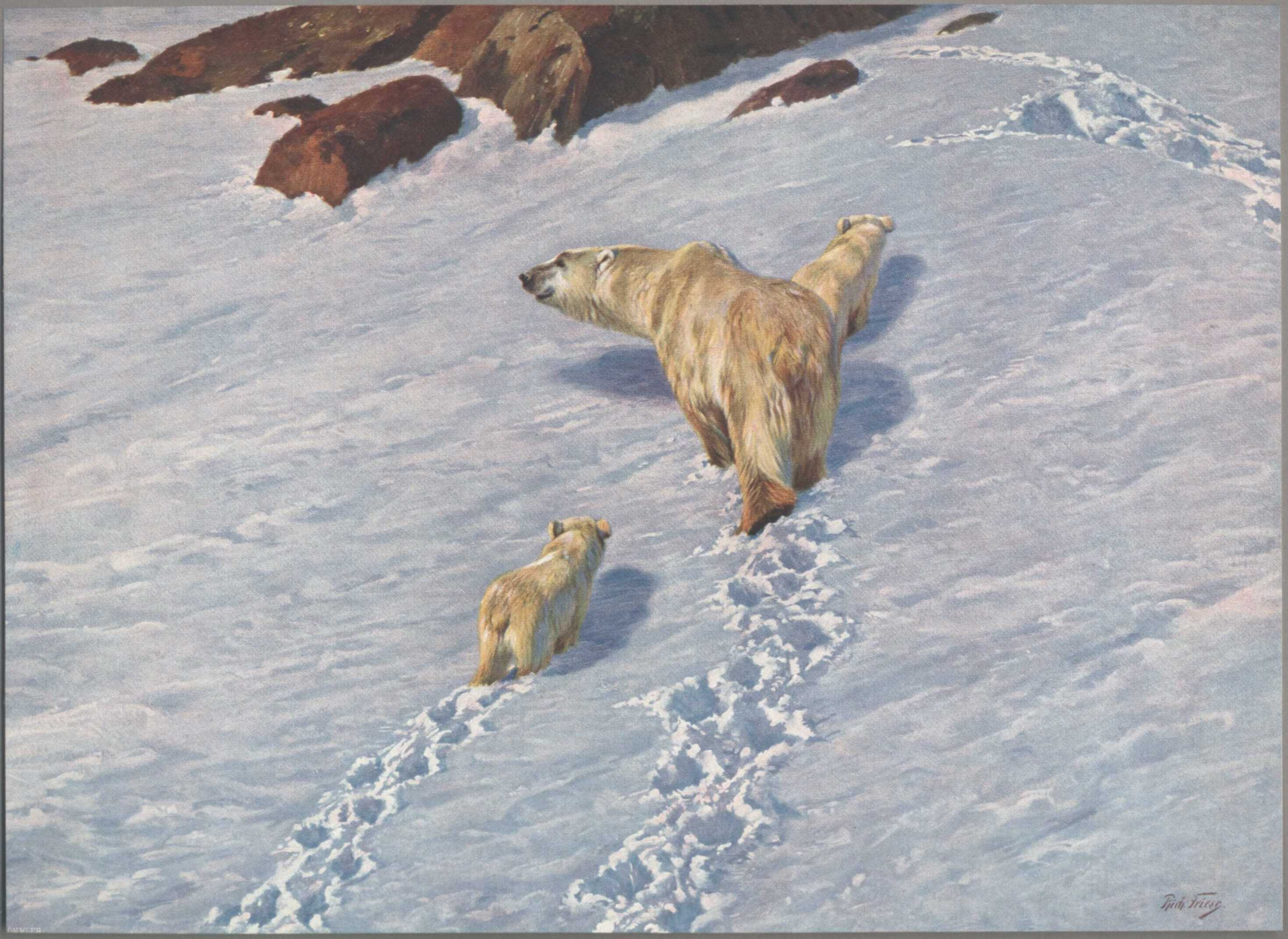
Polar bear family (German: Eisbären mit zwei Jungen in Schneelandschaft)

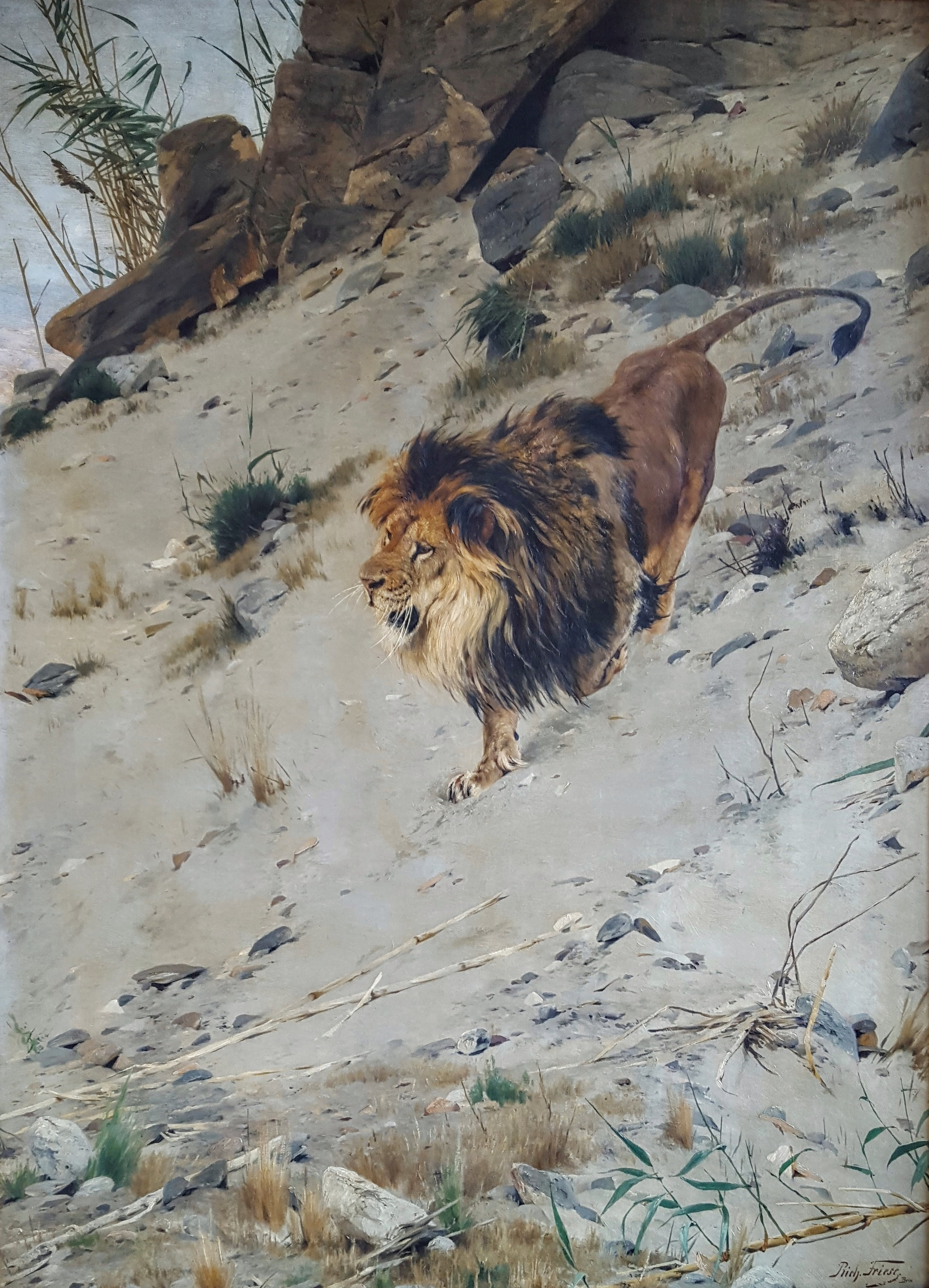
Lion (Der alte Herr vom Berge)

Richard Friese (15 December 1854 – 29 June 1918) was a German animal and landscape painter.

== Biography ==
He was born in Gumbinnen. He studied at the Academy in Berlin, where, after traveling in the orient, in Norway, and as far as the polar regions, he rapidly acquired his present reputation as one of the best animal painters in Germany, especially noted for his vivid delineations of the lion's life in the desert, and also of the native deer world in the German forest. He was awarded a gold medal in 1886, and elected a member of the Berlin Academy in 1892. He died in 1918 in Bad Zwischenahn.

== Works ==
His most noteworthy productions include:

- “Lions Surprising Caravan's Camp” (1884), Dresden Gallery
- “Elks on Field of Battle” (1890), National Gallery, Berlin
- “In the Bredszell Moor” (1895), Königsberg Museum
- “A Twenty-pronged Stag under Way,” owned by Emperor Wilhelm II

== See also ==
- List of German painters
