= Oldenburg – Ammerland =

Federal electoral district of Germany

27 Oldenburg – Ammerland
- Electoral district for the Bundestag
- Oldenburg – Ammerland in 2025
- State: Lower Saxony
- Population: 293,900 (2019)
- Electorate: 228,705 (2021)
- Major settlements: Oldenburg; Westerstede
- Area: 833.7 km^{2}

Current electoral district
- Created: 1949
- Party: SPD
- Member: Dennis Rohde
- Elected: 2013, 2017, 2021, 2025

Oldenburg – Ammerland is an electoral constituency (German: Wahlkreis) represented in the Bundestag. It elects one member via first-past-the-post voting. Under the current constituency numbering system, it is designated as constituency 27. It is located in northwestern Lower Saxony, comprising the city of Oldenburg and the district of Ammerland.

Oldenburg – Ammerland was created for the inaugural 1949 federal election. Since 2013, it has been represented by Dennis Rohde of the Social Democratic Party (SPD).

== Geography ==
Oldenburg – Ammerland is located in northwestern Lower Saxony. As of the 2021 federal election, it comprises the independent city of Oldenburg and the entirety of the district of Ammerland.

== History ==
Oldenburg – Ammerland was created in 1949. In the 1949 election, it was Lower Saxony constituency 8. For the 1953 through 1961 elections, it was constituency 30 in the numbering system. From 1965 through 1998, it was constituency 22; from 2002 through 2009, it was constituency 28. Since the 2013 election, it has been constituency 27.

Originally, it comprised the city of Oldenburg and the district of Ammerland. At this time, it was named Oldenburg. In the 1965 election, the constituency gained the municipalities of Bockhorn, Neuenburg, Sande, Varel, Varel-Land, and Zetel. Due to administrative reforms, in the 1976 election, it gained the municipality of Gödens.

In the 1980 election, the constituency was renamed to Oldenburg – Ammerland, and lost the municipality of Sande. The municipalities of Bockhorn, Varel, and Zetel also removed from the constituency in the 2002 election.

Election	No.	Name	Borders
1949	8	Oldenburg	Oldenburg city; Ammerland district
1953	30	Oldenburg	Oldenburg city; Ammerland district
1957	30	Oldenburg	Oldenburg city; Ammerland district
1961	30	Oldenburg	Oldenburg city; Ammerland district
1965	22	Oldenburg	Oldenburg city; Ammerland district; Friesland district (only Bockhorn, Neuenburg, Sande, Varel, Varel-Land, and Zetel municipalities)
1969	22	Oldenburg	Oldenburg city; Ammerland district; Friesland district (only Bockhorn, Neuenburg, Sande, Varel, Varel-Land, and Zetel municipalities)
1972	22	Oldenburg	Oldenburg city; Ammerland district; Friesland district (only Bockhorn, Neuenburg, Sande, Varel, Varel-Land, and Zetel municipalities)
1976	22	Oldenburg	Oldenburg city; Ammerland district; Friesland district (only Bockhorn, Neuenburg, Sande, Varel, Varel-Land, and Zetel municipalities)
1980	22	Oldenburg – Ammerland	Oldenburg city; Ammerland district; Friesland district (only Bockhorn, Varel, and Zetel municipalities)
1983	22	Oldenburg – Ammerland	Oldenburg city; Ammerland district; Friesland district (only Bockhorn, Varel, and Zetel municipalities)
1987	22	Oldenburg – Ammerland	Oldenburg city; Ammerland district; Friesland district (only Bockhorn, Varel, and Zetel municipalities)
1990	22	Oldenburg – Ammerland	Oldenburg city; Ammerland district; Friesland district (only Bockhorn, Varel, and Zetel municipalities)
1994	22	Oldenburg – Ammerland	Oldenburg city; Ammerland district; Friesland district (only Bockhorn, Varel, and Zetel municipalities)
1998	22	Oldenburg – Ammerland	Oldenburg city; Ammerland district; Friesland district (only Bockhorn, Varel, and Zetel municipalities)
2002	28	Oldenburg – Ammerland	Oldenburg city; Ammerland district
2005	28	Oldenburg – Ammerland	Oldenburg city; Ammerland district
2009	28	Oldenburg – Ammerland	Oldenburg city; Ammerland district
2013	27	Oldenburg – Ammerland	Oldenburg city; Ammerland district
2017	27	Oldenburg – Ammerland	Oldenburg city; Ammerland district
2021	27	Oldenburg – Ammerland	Oldenburg city; Ammerland district
2025	27	Oldenburg – Ammerland	Oldenburg city; Ammerland district

== Members ==
The constituency was held by the Free Democratic Party (FDP) from its creation in 1949 until 1957, during which time it was represented by Robert Dannemann. It was won by the Christian Democratic Union (CDU) in 1957, and represented by Wilhelm Nieberg (until 1965) and Heinz Frieler. In 1969, it was won by the Social Democratic Party (SPD) candidate Kurt Ross, who served for one term. He was succeeded in 1972 by Walter Polkehn, who served until 1987. Dietmar Schütz was representative from then until 2002, followed by Gesine Multhaupt. Thomas Kossendey of the CDU served a single term from 2009 to 2013. Dennis Rohde of the SPD was elected in 2013, and re-elected in 2017 and 2021.

Election	Member	Party	%
1949	Robert Dannemann	FDP	24.8
1953	Robert Dannemann	FDP	56.5
1957	Wilhelm Nieberg	CDU	35.9
1961	Wilhelm Nieberg	CDU	34.9
1965	Heinz Frieler	CDU	38.2
1969	Kurt Ross	SPD	42.9
1972	Walter Polkehn	SPD	52.9
1976	Walter Polkehn	SPD	47.7
1980	Walter Polkehn	SPD	48.8
1983	Walter Polkehn	SPD	45.0
1987	Dietmar Schütz	SPD	45.1
1990	Dietmar Schütz	SPD	43.6
1994	Dietmar Schütz	SPD	46.5
1998	Dietmar Schütz	SPD	51.5
2002	Gesine Multhaupt	SPD	47.1
2005	Gesine Multhaupt	SPD	44.7
2009	Thomas Kossendey	CDU	35.5
2013	Dennis Rohde	SPD	37.4
2017	Dennis Rohde	SPD	36.3
2021	Dennis Rohde	SPD	38.2
2025	Dennis Rohde	SPD	34.4

== Election results ==
=== 2025 election ===
Federal election (2025): Oldenburg – Ammerland
Notes:	Blue background denotes the winner of the electorate vote. Pink background denotes a candidate elected from their party list. Yellow background denotes an electorate win by a list member, or other incumbent. A ✓ or ✗ denotes status of any incumbent, win or lose respectively.						
Party	Candidate	Votes	%	±%	Party votes	%	±%
SPD	✓ Dennis Rohde	66,280	34.4	▼3.8	46,024	23.8	▼8.2
CDU	Stephan Albani	46,173	24.0	▲4.1	46,074	23.9	▲5.2
Greens	Alaa Alhamwi	28,728	14.9	▼5.5	31,857	16.5	▼7.2
AfD	Andreas Paul	25,045	13.0	▲8.0	24,919	12.9	▲7.7
Left	Arne Brix	15,673	8.1	▲2.2	21,699	11.2	▲6.4
FDP	Carsten Helms	5,996	3.1	▼4.4	8,555	4.4	▼5.8
BSW					7,359	3.8	
Tierschutzpartei					2,027	1.0	▼0.1
Volt	Andreas Werner	2,750	1.4		1,722	0.9	▲0.3
PARTEI					966	0.5	▼0.4
FW	Hero Stroman	2,071	1.1	▲0.3	945	0.5	▼0.1
dieBasis					337	0.2	▼0.8
Pirates					269	0.1	▼0.3
BD					200	0.1	
Humanists					173	0.1	0.0
MLPD					55	0.0	0.0
Informal votes		1,390			925		
Total valid votes		192,716			193,181		
Turnout		194,106	84.6	▲8.8			
SPD hold	Majority	20,107	10.4	▼7.4			

=== 2021 election ===
Federal election (2021): Oldenburg – Ammerland
Notes:	Blue background denotes the winner of the electorate vote. Pink background denotes a candidate elected from their party list. Yellow background denotes an electorate win by a list member, or other incumbent. A ✓ or ✗ denotes status of any incumbent, win or lose respectively.						
Party	Candidate	Votes	%	±%	Party votes	%	±%
SPD	✓ Dennis Rohde	65,757	38.2	▲1.9	55,231	32.0	▲6.0
Greens	Susanne Menge	35,119	20.4	▲9.0	40,919	23.7	▲11.2
CDU	Stephan Albani	34,294	19.9	▼10.3	32,100	18.6	▼12.0
FDP	Daniel Rüdel	12,859	7.5	▲1.4	17,674	10.2	▼0.1
Left	Amira Mohamed Ali	10,183	5.9	▼2.2	8,344	4.8	▼4.5
AfD	Andreas Paul	8,572	5.0	▼1.7	8,903	5.2	▼2.1
Tierschutzpartei					2,009	1.2	▲0.3
dieBasis	Werner Georg Berends	1,907	1.1		1,729	1.0	
PARTEI					1,481	0.9	▼0.2
Pirates	Holger Lubitz	1,524	0.9		795	0.5	▲0.1
FW	Nicole Striess	1,416	0.8	0.0	1,041	0.6	▲0.2
Volt					1,006	0.6	
Team Todenhöfer					428	0.2	
ÖDP	Michael Krüger	471	0.3	▼0.2	247	0.1	▼0.1
Humanists					176	0.1	
V-Partei3					137	0.1	▼0.1
NPD					107	0.1	▼0.1
du.					85	0.1	
LKR	Jens Ahrends	137	0.1		58	0.0	
DKP					51	0.0	0.0
MLPD	Johanna Jensen	89	0.1		29	0.0	0.0
Informal votes		1,397			1,175		
Total valid votes		172,328			172,550		
Turnout		173,727	76.0	▼1.8			
SPD hold	Majority	30,638	17.8	▲11.7			

=== 2017 election ===
Federal election (2017): Oldenburg – Ammerland
Notes:	Blue background denotes the winner of the electorate vote. Pink background denotes a candidate elected from their party list. Yellow background denotes an electorate win by a list member, or other incumbent. A ✓ or ✗ denotes status of any incumbent, win or lose respectively.						
Party	Candidate	Votes	%	±%	Party votes	%	±%
SPD	✓ Dennis Rohde	63,235	36.3	▼1.1	45,514	26.1	▼6.5
CDU	Stephan Albani	52,598	30.2	▼6.6	53,417	30.6	▼4.6
Greens	Peter Meiwald	19,827	11.4	▼0.1	21,821	12.5	▲0.1
Left	Amira Mohamed Ali	14,081	8.1	▲2.6	16,351	9.4	▲2.9
AfD	Andreas Paul	11,592	6.7	▲3.3	12,625	7.2	▲3.0
FDP	Nils Krummacker	10,635	6.1	▲3.7	18,136	10.4	▲5.3
PARTEI					1,837	1.1	
Tierschutzpartei					1,457	0.8	0.0
FW	Claudia Theis	1,393	0.8	▲0.1	687	0.4	▼0.2
ÖDP	Ingrid Brettschneider	809	0.5		418	0.2	
Pirates					682	0.4	▼1.4
BGE					372	0.2	
NPD					336	0.2	▼0.5
V-Partei³					332	0.2	
DiB					298	0.2	
DM					264	0.2	
MLPD					77	0.0	0.0
DKP					57	0.0	
Informal votes		1,797			1,286		
Total valid votes		174,170			174,681		
Turnout		175,967	77.8	▲3.6			
SPD hold	Majority	10,637	6.1	▲5.5			

=== 2013 election ===
Federal election (2013): Oldenburg – Ammerland
Notes:	Blue background denotes the winner of the electorate vote. Pink background denotes a candidate elected from their party list. Yellow background denotes an electorate win by a list member, or other incumbent. A ✓ or ✗ denotes status of any incumbent, win or lose respectively.						
Party	Candidate	Votes	%	±%	Party votes	%	±%
SPD	Dennis Rohde	60,547	37.4	▲6.1	52,856	32.6	▲5.5
CDU	Stephan Albani	59,525	36.8	▲1.2	57,067	35.2	▲7.1
Greens	Peter Meiwald	18,552	11.5	▼2.4	20,170	12.4	▼3.0
Left	Martin A. Michels	8,794	5.4	▼3.6	10,523	6.5	▼3.2
AfD	Melanie Wever	5,502	3.4		6,833	4.2	
FDP	Lübbo Meppen	3,966	2.5	▼6.4	8,210	5.1	▼9.5
Pirates	Holger Lubitz	2,669	1.6		2,853	1.8	▼0.8
Tierschutzpartei					1,308	0.8	▼0.1
FW	Hero Jan Stroman	1,147	0.7		923	0.6	
NPD	Ulrich Eigenfeld	1,093	0.7	▼0.3	1,050	0.6	▼0.2
PBC					132	0.1	
PRO					100	0.1	
MLPD					62	0.0	0.0
REP					54	0.0	
Informal votes		1,748			1,402		
Total valid votes		161,795			162,141		
Turnout		163,543	74.2	▲0.8			
SPD gain from CDU	Majority	1,022	0.6				

=== 2009 election ===
Federal election (2009): Oldenburg – Ammerland
Notes:	Blue background denotes the winner of the electorate vote. Pink background denotes a candidate elected from their party list. Yellow background denotes an electorate win by a list member, or other incumbent. A ✓ or ✗ denotes status of any incumbent, win or lose respectively.						
Party	Candidate	Votes	%	±%	Party votes	%	±%
CDU	Thomas Kossendey	55,610	35.5	0.0	44,090	28.1	▼0.2
SPD	✗ Gesine Multhaupt	49,020	31.3	▼13.4	42,551	27.1	▼16.9
Greens	Peter Meiwald	21,651	13.8	▲3.9	24,171	15.4	▲4.3
Left	Iris Gramberg	14,080	9.0	▲4.1	15,244	9.7	▲4.5
FDP	Christiane Ratjen-Damerau	13,840	8.8	▲5.0	22,917	14.6	▲5.3
Pirates					4,000	2.6	
NPD	Michael Meyer	1,548	1.0	0.0	1,345	0.9	▼0.1
Tierschutzpartei					1,349	0.9	▲0.3
RRP	Dieter Zager	707	0.5		821	0.5	
ÖDP					192	0.1	
DVU					124	0.1	
MLPD					53	0.0	0.0
Informal votes		1,891			1,490		
Total valid votes		156,456			156,857		
Turnout		158,347	73.4	▼5.7			
CDU gain from SPD	Majority	6,590	4.2				

=== 2005 election ===
Federal election (2005):Oldenburg – Ammerland
Notes:	Blue background denotes the winner of the electorate vote. Pink background denotes a candidate elected from their party list. Yellow background denotes an electorate win by a list member, or other incumbent. A ✓ or ✗ denotes status of any incumbent, win or lose respectively.						
Party	Candidate	Votes	%	±%	Party votes	%	±%
SPD	✓ Gesine Multhaupt	73,355	44.7	▼2.4	72,316	44.0	▼4.4
CDU	Thomas Kossendey	58,364	35.6	▲2.3	46,510	28.3	▲0.2
Greens	Thea Dückert	16,369	10.0	▼0.8	18,185	11.1	▼0.3
Left	Gernot Koch	7,963	4.9	▲3.3	8,583	5.2	▲3.6
FDP	Hans-Dieter Jerems	6,341	3.9	▼3.2	15,308	9.3	▲0.5
NPD	Ullrich Eigenfeld	1,595	1.0		1,592	1.0	▲0.8
Tierschutzpartei					915	0.6	▲0.2
GRAUEN					487	0.3	▲0.1
PBC					186	0.1	0.0
Pro German Center – Pro D-Mark Initiative					140	0.1	
MLPD					81	0.0	
BüSo					62	0.0	0.0
Informal votes		2,219			1,841		
Total valid votes		163,987			164,365		
Turnout		166,206	79.1	▼0.9			
SPD hold	Majority	14,991	9.1				
