= Dennis Rohde =

German politician (born 1986)

Dennis Rohde MdB
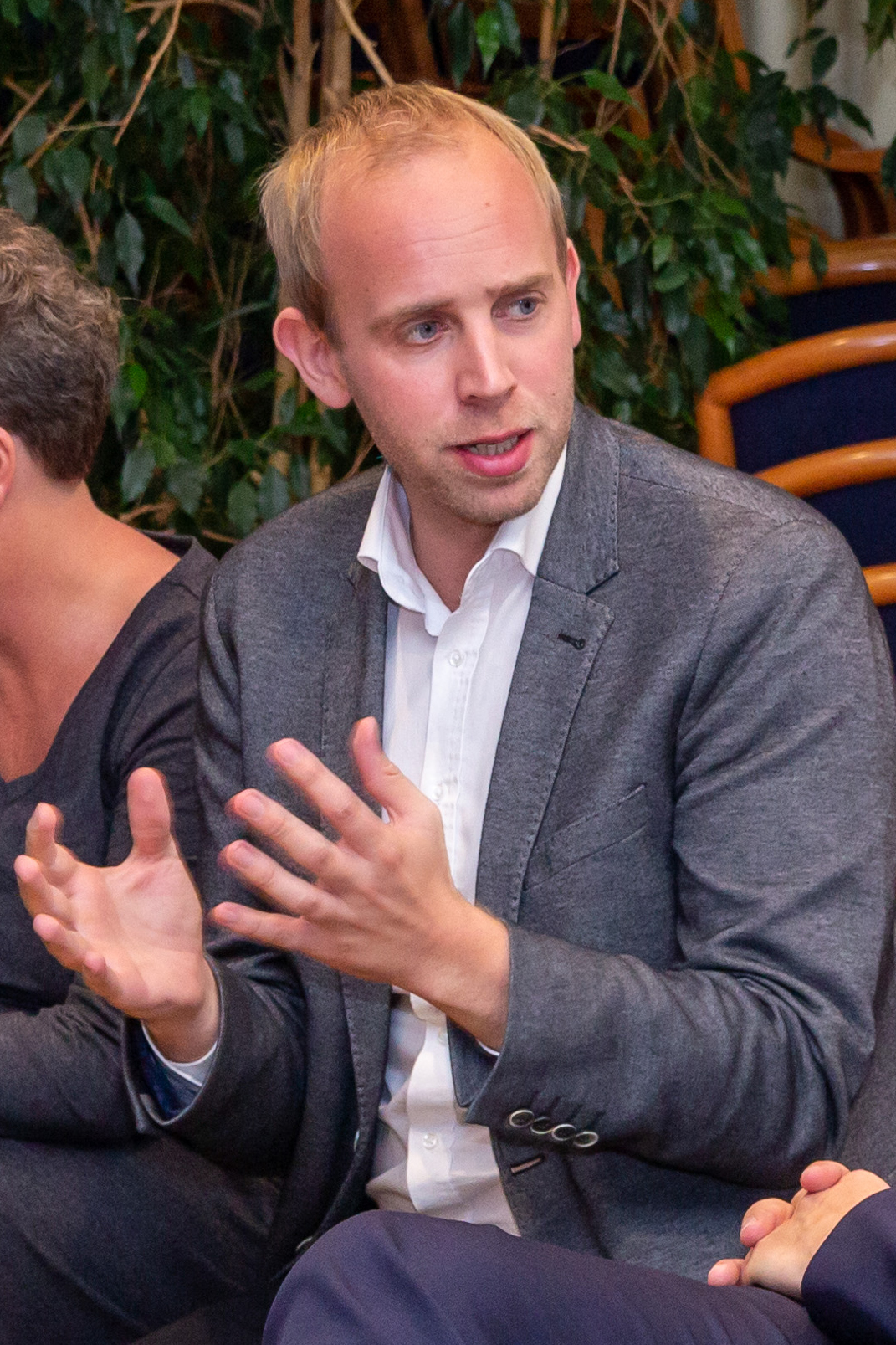
- Rohde in 2019

Member of the Bundestag; for Oldenburg – Ammerland
- Incumbent
- Assumed office 22 October 2013
- Preceded by: Thomas Kossendey

Personal details
- Born: 24 June 1986 (age 40) Oldenburg, West Germany
- Party: Social Democratic
- Children: 1
- Education: Leibniz University Hannover

Dennis Rohde (born 24 June 1986) is a German lawyer and politician of the Social Democratic Party (SPD) who has been serving as a member of the Bundestag from the state of Lower Saxony since 2013 elections.

In addition to his parliamentary work, Rohde has been serving as a Parliamentary State Secretary at the Federal Ministry of Finance in the government of Chancellor Friedrich Merz since 2025.

== Political career ==
Rohde first became member of the Bundestag in the 2013 German federal election, representing Oldenburg – Ammerland. From 2013 to 2025, he was a member of both the Budget Committee and the Audit Committee. From 2014 until 2016, he also served on the Committee on Legal Affairs and Consumer Protection.

On the Budget Committee, Rohde was the SPD parliamentary group's rapporteur on the annual budgets of the Federal Ministry of Defence and the Federal Constitutional Court from 2018 to 2025. From 2020, he served as his parliamentary group's spokesperson on budgetary affairs. He also joined the so-called Confidential Committee (Vertrauensgremium) of the Budget Committee, which provides budgetary supervision for Germany's three intelligence services, BND, BfV and MAD.

From 2020 to 2025, Rohde was a member of the parliament’s Council of Elders, which – among other duties – determines daily legislative agenda items and assigns committee chairpersons based on party representation.

Within his parliamentary group, Rohde belongs to the Seeheim Circle.

In the negotiations to form a so-called traffic light coalition of the SPD, the Green Party and the Free Democratic Party (FDP) following the 2021 federal elections, Rohde was part of his party's delegation in the working group on financial regulation and the national budget, co-chaired by Doris Ahnen, Lisa Paus and Christian Dürr.

== Other activities ==
- Baskets Oldenburg, Member of the Advisory Board
- Sozialverband Deutschland (SoVD), Member
- German United Services Trade Union (ver.di), Member
- Workers' Welfare Federal Association (AWO), Member
