= Bad Zwischenahn =

- Municipality
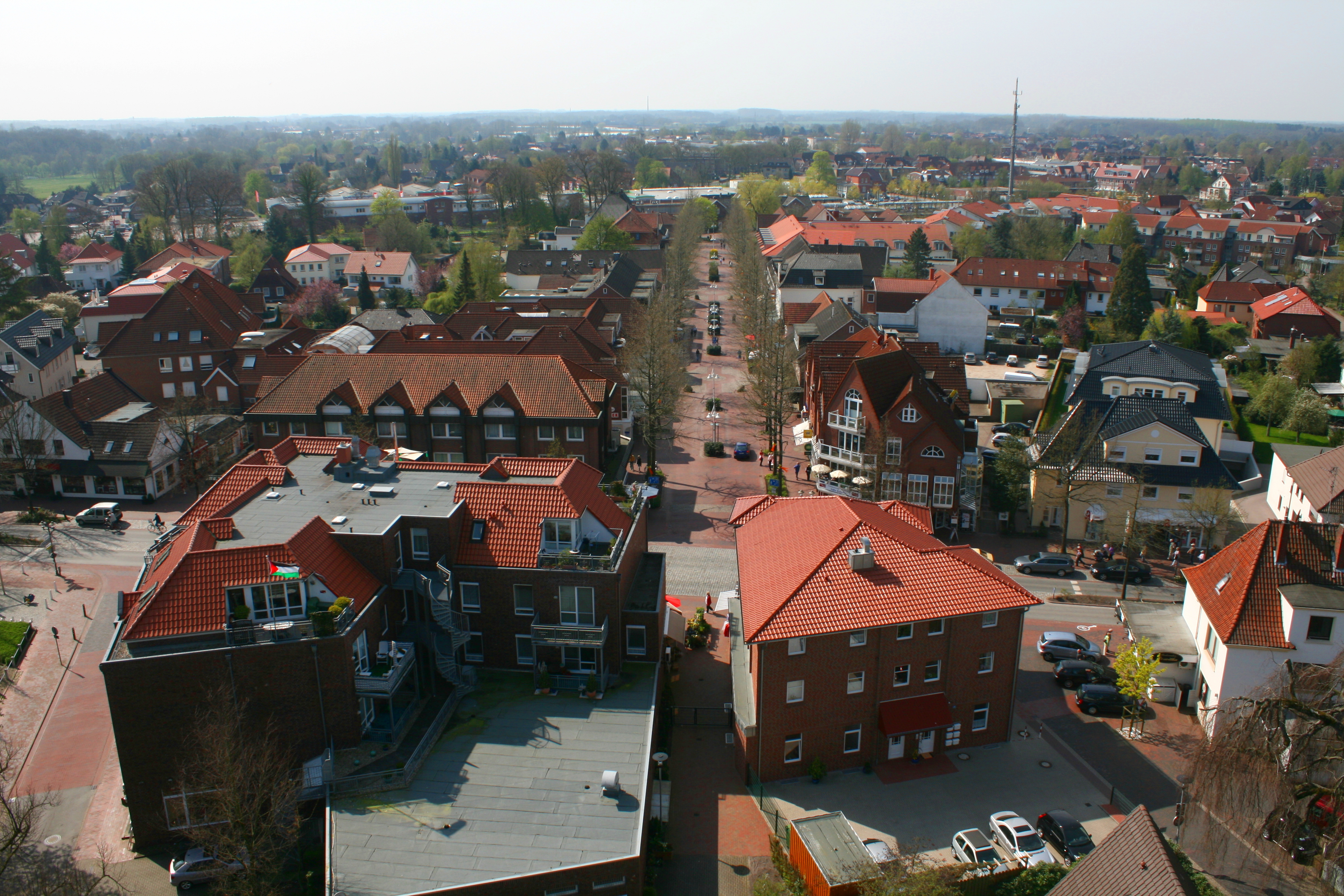
- Aerial view

- Flag Coat of arms

- Location of Bad Zwischenahn within Ammerland district
- Interactive map of Bad Zwischenahn
- Location within Germany Location within Lower Saxony
- Coordinates: 53°11′01″N 08°00′35″E
- Country: Germany
- State: Lower Saxony
- District: Ammerland
- Subdivisions: 19 districts

Government
  - Mayor (2021–26): Henning Dierks (SPD)

Area
  - Total: 130.1 km^{2} (50.2 sq mi)
- Elevation: 7 m (23 ft)

Population (2025-12-31)
  - Total: 29,613
  - Density: 227.6/km^{2} (589.5/sq mi)
- Time zone: UTC+01:00 (CET)
  - Summer (DST): UTC+02:00 (CEST)
- Postal codes: 26160
- Dialling codes: 04403
- Vehicle registration: WST
- Website: www.bad-zwischenahn.de

Bad Zwischenahn (German pronunciation: [baːt ˈtsvɪʃn̩ʔaːn]; Low German: Twüschenahn) is a municipality in the low-lying Ammerland district, in Lower Saxony, Germany. It is on Zwischenahner Meer, approximately 15 km northwest of Oldenburg and about 70 km south of the North Sea coast.

== History ==
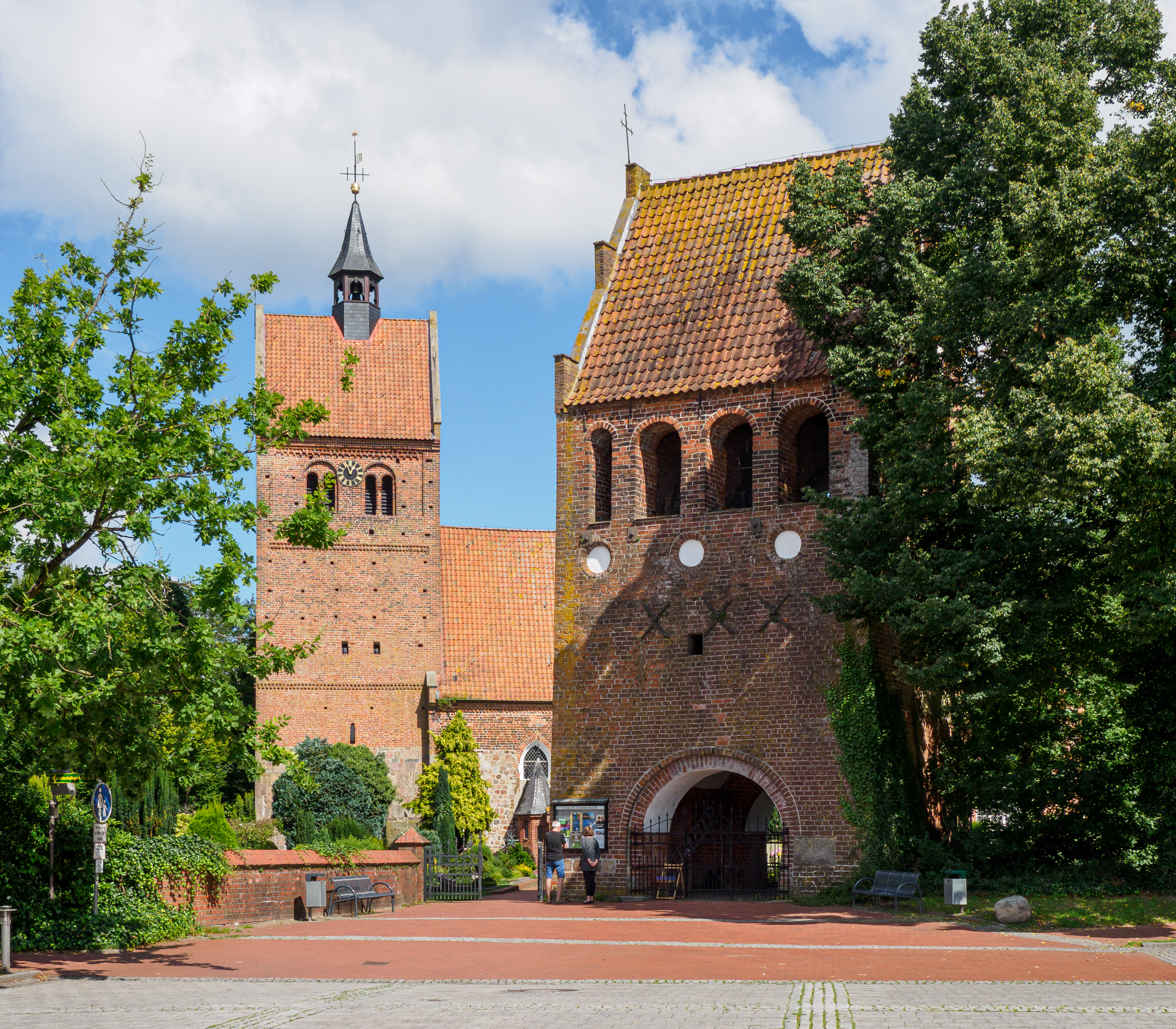
St John's Church

The first written evidence of Zwischenahn dates back to 1124 in connection with the founding of St. John's Church by Count Egilmar of Oldenburg.

During the Nazi era, Bad Zwischenahn was one of the Nazi strongholds in Ammerland and the whole of Emsland. During World War II Bad Zwischenahn was home to the largest Luftwaffe airbase in northern Germany, the 'Adlerhorst' military airport in Rostrup (Bad Zwischenahn). From here, Luftwaffe pilots flew their attacks on the Netherlands and Great Britain from May 10, 1940. Since 1943, the airport was home of the Erprobungskommando 16 service-test unit, then Jagdgeschwader 400 each in their turn operating the Messerschmitt Me 163 Komet rocket fighter from the base. The airbase was heavily bombed in 1944 and 1945. After the war, the airbase was converted to a golf course. In April 1945, Pastor Wilhelm Schulze convinced the German troops to surrender and negotiated with Canadian troops to avoid the destruction of the town.

== Economy ==
The main economic activities of Bad Zwischenahn were and are based on tree nurseries, the food industry (sausage and ham production), and resort community services for the well to do urban population of Oldenburg and Bremen. Bad Zwischenahn is a spa town, German : Kurort.

The lake is used for boating, bathing and recreation, with some eel fishing still undertaken.

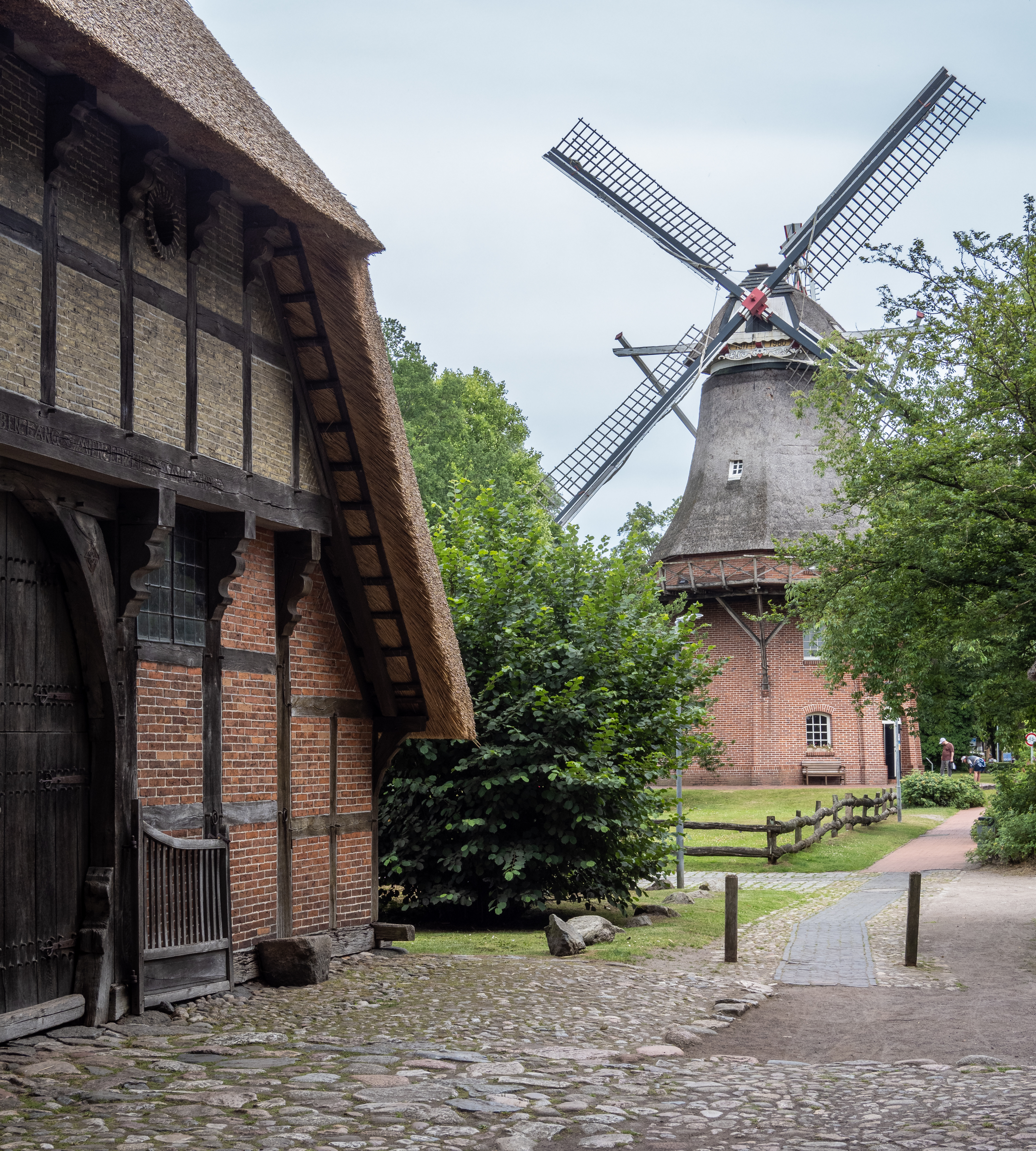
Open air museum with farmhouse and windmill

One of the premier sites for tourists is a windmill originally built in 1811 in Westerstede. It is part of a historical museum farm consisting of 14 houses and auxiliary buildings that were moved to their today's location from 1909 to 2004. One of the buildings is called the Spieker and shelters a restaurant of the same name, integrating into the centuries-old architecture.

A major source of income is the tourism industry. In Bad Zwischenahn there is an above average number of apartments from private providers. These homes often have a higher standard and are awarded with 3 stars or more. Bad Zwischenahn is also a popular tourist destination for retirees, due to the numerous spa facilities.

=== The Karl Jaspers mental hospital ===
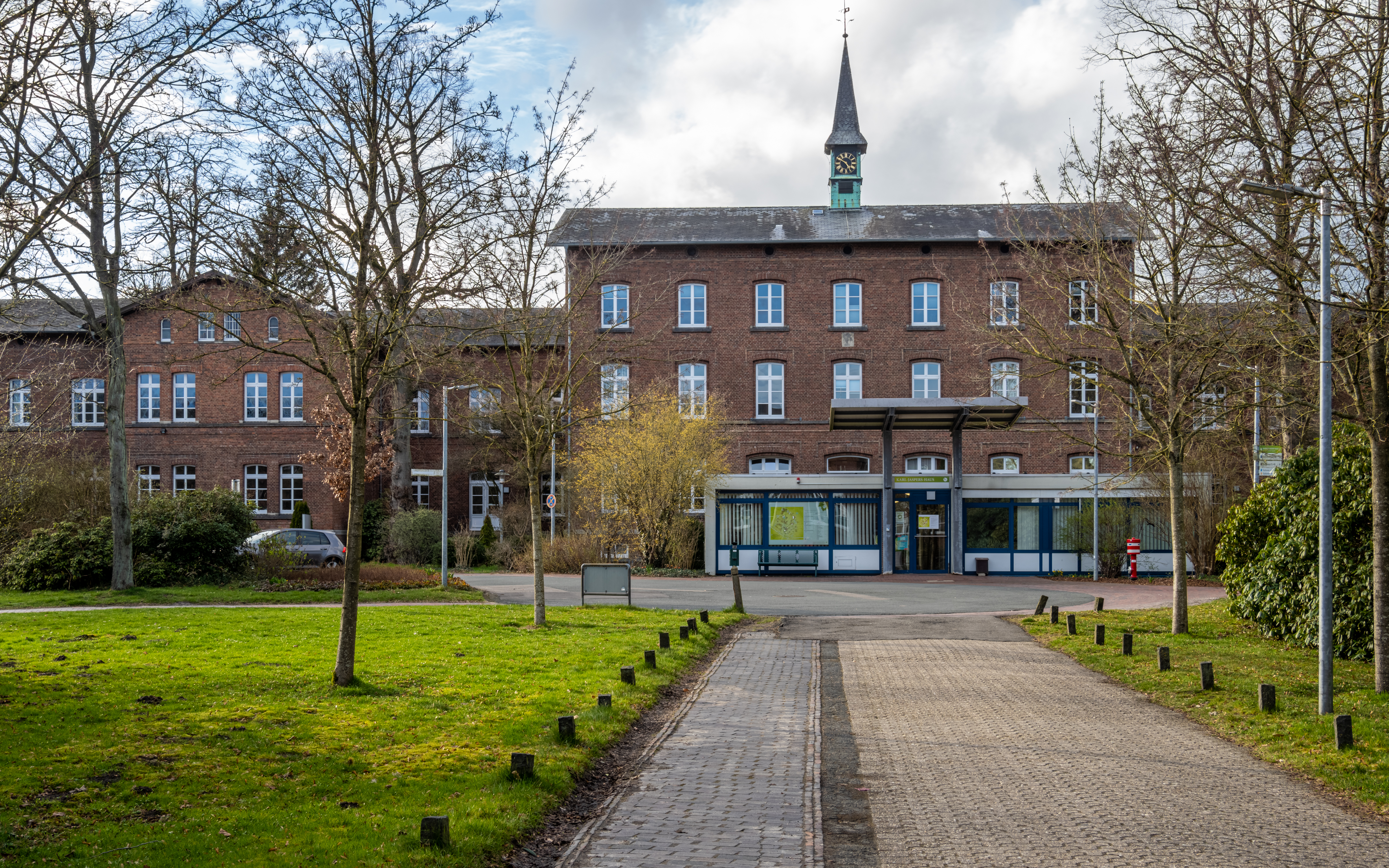
Karl-Jaspers-Haus

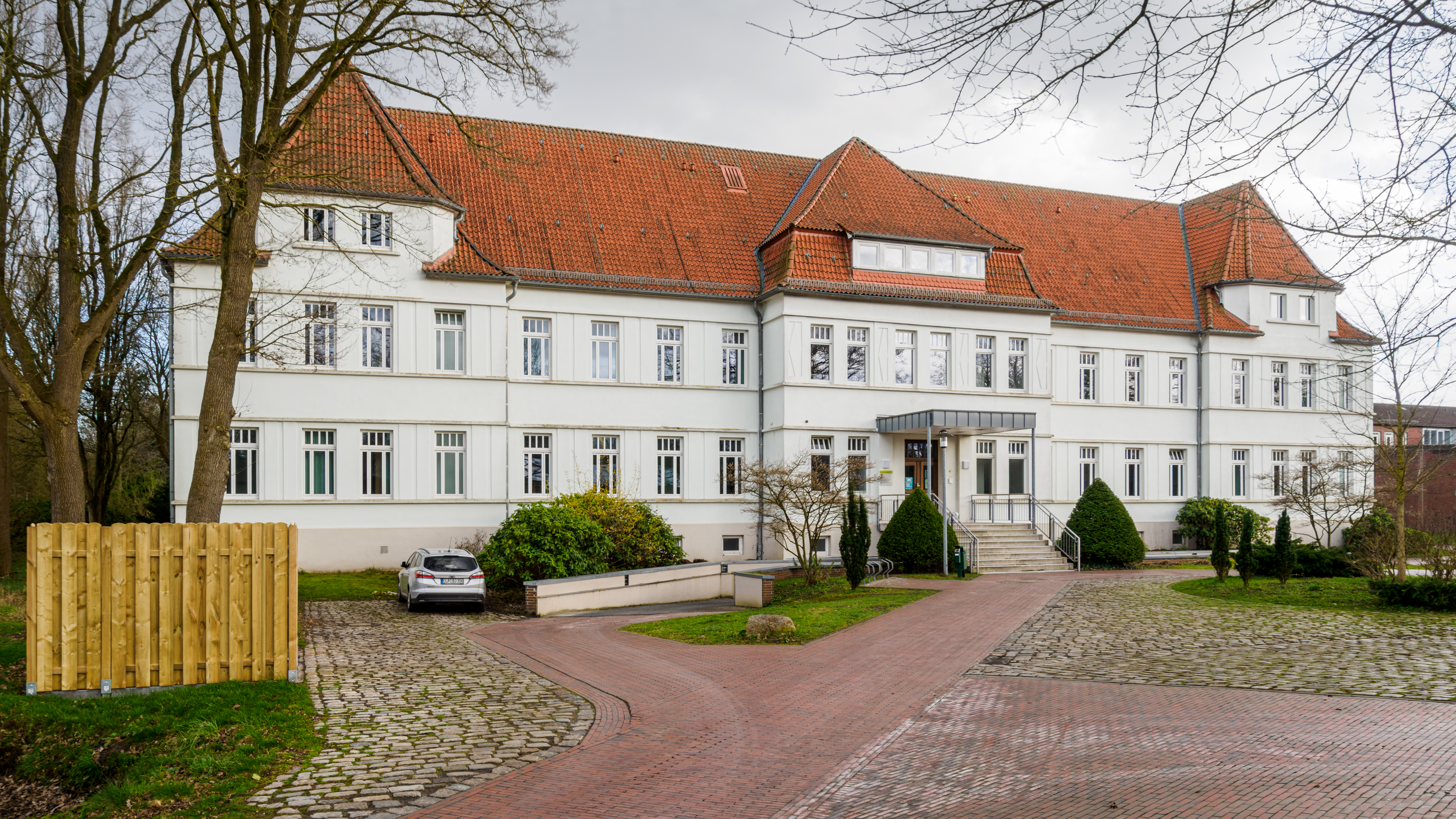
Kurt-Schneider-Haus

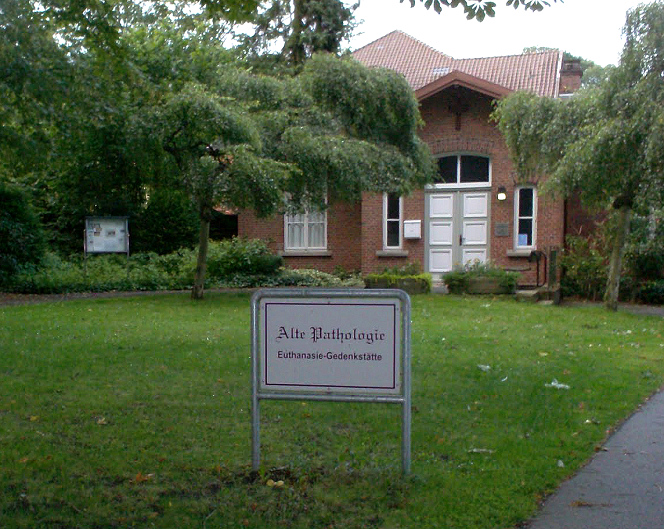
Memorial site Alte Pathologie

Economically important as well is the psychiatric hospital in the village of Wehnen, 8 km east of the town itself. This Karl-Jaspers-Klinik has a staff of about 1,000 men and women. It is the academic psychiatrical hospital of the University of Oldenburg. The institution, already founded in 1857 as a lunatic asylum, nowadays having a good reputation, was notorious during Adolf Hitlers Third Reich. Many patients were brought to death within the Nazi euthanasia policy (Aktion T4), in many cases by food deprivation. Not earlier than about the year 2000, scientific investigations into these crime against humanity were carried out. A small building on the institution's premises, Alte Pathologie, (Ancient Pathologic Lab), was transformed into a memorial centre in 2002. In 2017, a movie, starring Nadja Uhl, titled Ich werde nicht schweigen ( I will not keep silent), was brought out. This film deals with the fate of a woman, falsely declared lunatic by the Nazis in Wehnen. The film is based on true events.

== Transport ==
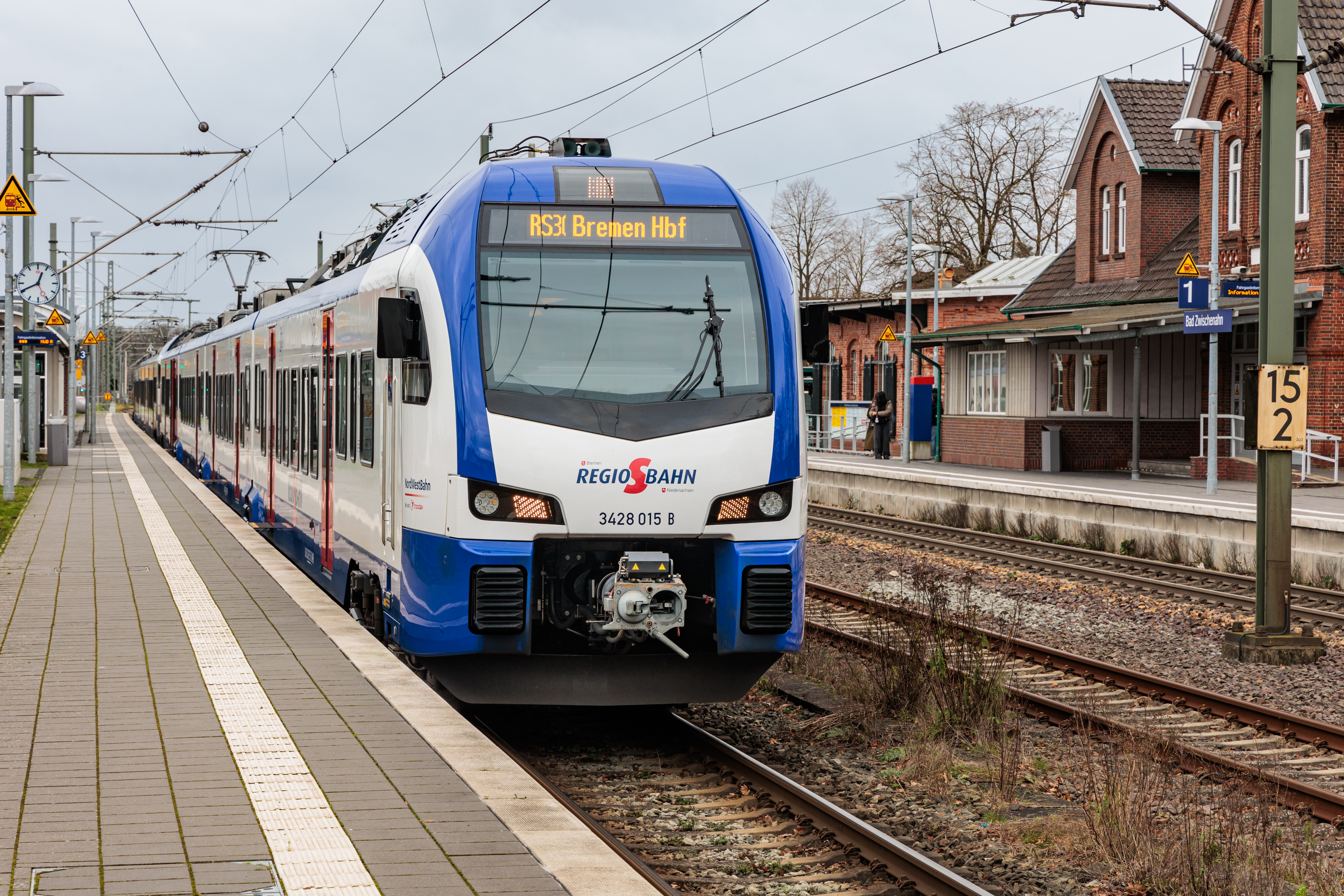
RS30 at the station

The Bad Zwischenahn railway station is located along the Oldenburg-Leer railway line, and features InterCity and regional services.

There are regular ferry routes on the Zwischenahner Meer from Bad Zwischenahn to Dreibergen and Rostrup.

== Local traditions ==
Locally smoked eels are a delicacy, particularly when served with a locally produced schnapps called Ammerländer Löffeltrunk. There is a specific local tradition (also called Ammerländer Löffeltrunk) to drink it from a tin spoon along with a special drinking cheer, each line alternately spoken by the host and the guests:

Original (Low German)	German translation	English translation
Ik she Di!	Ich sehe Dich!	I see you!
Dat freit mi!	Das freut mich!	That makes me glad!
Ik sup Di to!	Ich trinke Dir zu!	I drink to you!
Dat do!	Tu das!	Do that!
Prost!	Prost!	Cheers!
Ik heb Di tosopen!	Ich habe Dir zugetrunken!	I've drunk to you!
Hest den Rechten dropen!	Du hast den Richtigen getroffen!	You met the right one!
So hebt wi dat immer doh'n!	So haben wir das immer getan!	That's how we always did!
So schall dat ok wieter goh'n!	So soll das auch weiter gehen!	That's how it shall go on!

Beside drinking, the Ammerländer Löffeltrunk is also used to clean one's hands after eating the smoked eel.

== Twin towns – sister cities ==
Bad Zwischenahn is twinned with:

- Centerville, United States
- Gołuchów, Poland
- Izegem, Belgium

== Notable people ==
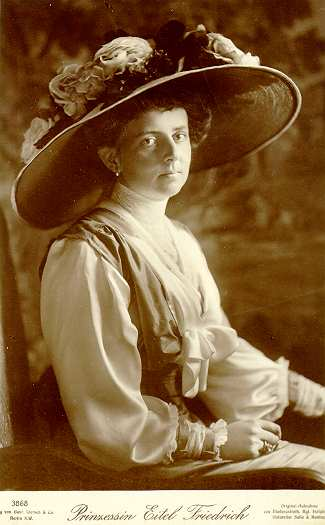
Sophie Charlotte von Oldenburg in 1913

- Wilhelm Heinrich Schüßler (1821–1898), physician
- Carsten Linke (born 1965), footballer

=== Connected to Bad Zwischenahn ===
- Gerhard VI, Count of Oldenburg (1430–1500), sea and street robber, regent of Bad Zwischenahn
- Richard Friese (1854–1918), animal painter and sculptor, died here
- Johann Friedrich Höger (1877–1949), architect, built the water tower in Bad Zwischenahn in 1928
- Sophie Charlotte von Oldenburg (1879–1964), duchess, lived here in 1951–1964
- Janosch (born 1931), author and painter, lived here in 1946–1952 and in 1953–1958
- Udo Pastörs (born 1952), politician (NPD), grown up here
- Geza de Kaplany (born 1926), Hungarian anesthesiologist who tortured his wife to death with acid in 1962, lives here
