= Ammerland =

District in Lower Saxony, Germany

Coordinates: 53°15′N 7°55′E

- District
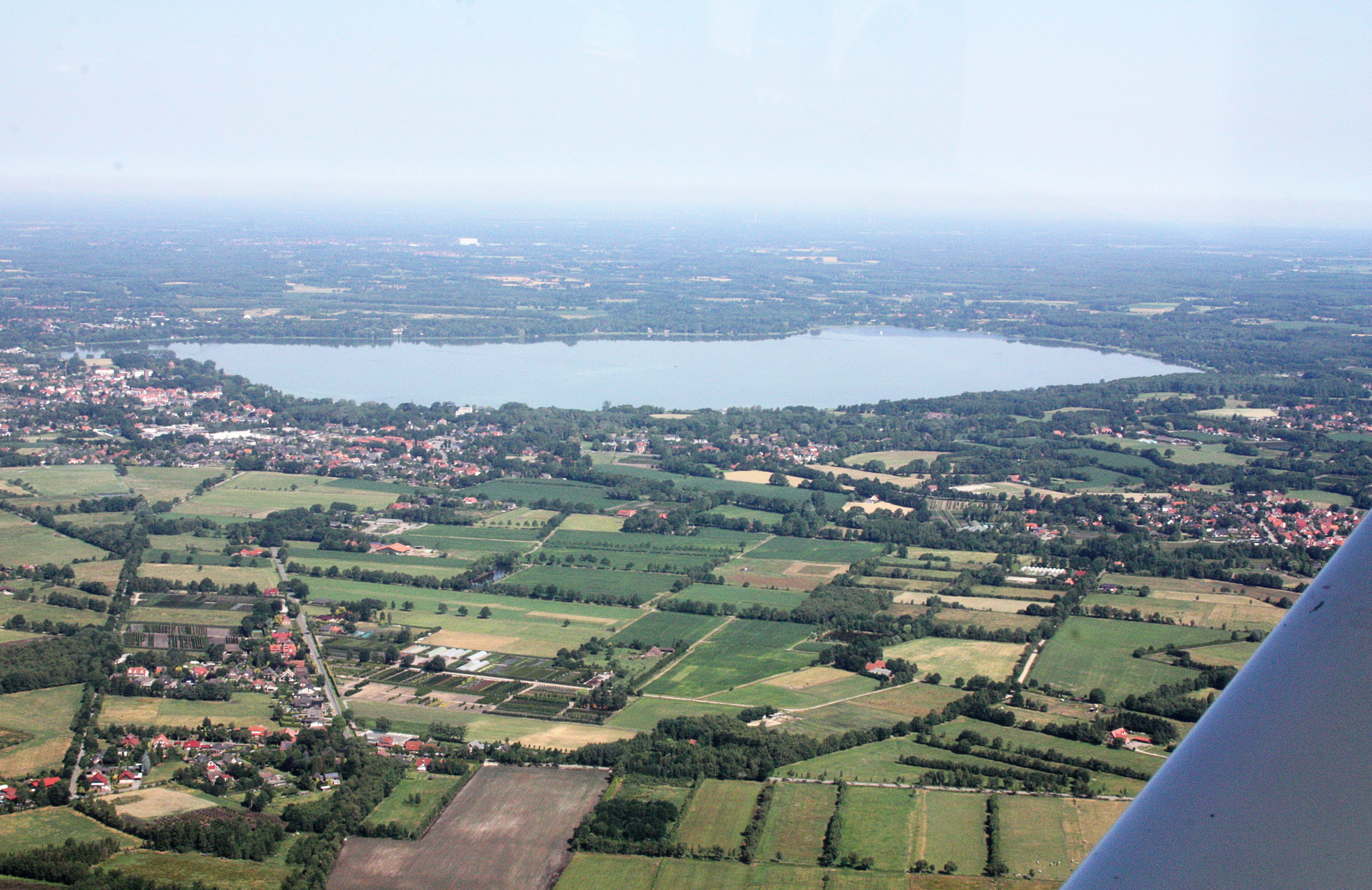

- Flag Coat of arms
- Country: Germany
- State: Lower Saxony
- Capital: Westerstede

Government
  - District admin.: Karin Harms

Area
  - Total: 728 km^{2} (281 sq mi)

Population (31 December 2024)
  - Total: 127,751
  - Density: 175/km^{2} (454/sq mi)
- Time zone: UTC+01:00 (CET)
  - Summer (DST): UTC+02:00 (CEST)
- Vehicle registration: WST
- Website: ammerland.de

Ammerland is a district in Lower Saxony, Germany. It is bounded by (from the east and clockwise) the city of Oldenburg and the districts of Oldenburg, Cloppenburg, Leer, Friesland and Wesermarsch.

== History ==
The "Ammerland" was first mentioned in the 10th century. The word is believed to derive from Ameri, which is an old word meaning "swamp". In the time of Viking raids small ring-like castles were built in order to protect the defenceless hamlets.

For many years there was little interest in this swampy region. In the 14th century it became part of the County of Oldenburg. The counts established strongholds in the region, which was the frontier against the lands of the untamable Frisians.

The district was established in 1933 in the rough borders of the historical region.

== Geography ==
Ammerland is characterised by a very flat countryside, many fens and swamps, and many windmills. The latter are a symbol of the district, which calls itself sometimes the "land of windmills".

The central point of the district is the Zwischenahner Meer located near the resort town of Bad Zwischenahn, a lake with an area of 5.5 km^{2} (Meer is the German word for "sea", but in the local Low German, as in Dutch, it means mere (lake), pond).

== Coat-of-arms ==
The coat-of-arms displays:

- top left: the red stripes from the arms of the counts of Oldenburg
- top right: the golden cross of the County of Bentinck (1733–1818 in Varel; Wiefelstede was a part of this county)
- bottom left: the acorn symbolising the common oaks of the Ammerland
- bottom right: the red zigzag lines are an ancient symbol of the Ammerland

Its blazon is: "Quarterly Or and Azure, I: two bars Gules; II: a Greek cross Or; III: an oak stem with leaf and acorn Or; IV: two bars dancetty Gules".

== Cities and municipalities ==
Clickable map of towns and municipalities in the district

Cities
1. Westerstede
Municipalities
1. Apen
2. Bad Zwischenahn
3. Edewecht
4. Rastede
5. Wiefelstede
