= Second Adenauer cabinet =

West German government from 1953 to 1957

Second Cabinet of Konrad Adenauer Cabinet Adenauer II
- 2nd Cabinet of the Federal Republic of Germany
- 20 October 1953 – 15 October 1957 (until 29 October 1957 as caretaker government)
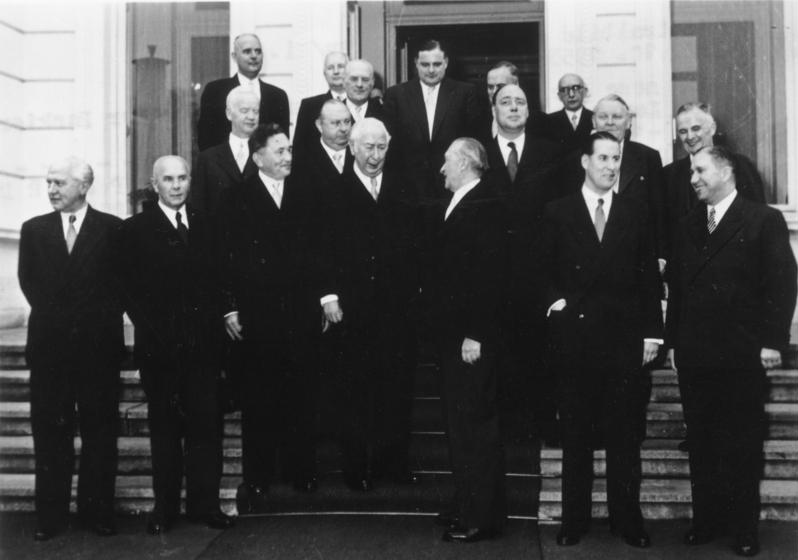
- Date formed: 20 October 1953
- Date dissolved: 29 October 1957 (4 years, 1 week and 2 days)

People and organisations
- President: Theodor Heuss
- Chancellor: Konrad Adenauer
- Vice-Chancellor: Franz Blücher
- Member party: Christian Democratic Union; Christian Social Union; Free Democratic Party; All-German Bloc/League of Expellees and Deprived of Rights; German Party (DP)
- Status in legislature: Coalition supermajority
- Opposition party: Social Democratic Party; Centre Party
- Opposition leader: Erich Ollenhauer (SPD)

History
- Election: 1953 West German federal election
- Legislature term: 2nd Bundestag
- Predecessor: Adenauer I
- Successor: Adenauer III

The Second Adenauer cabinet led by Konrad Adenauer was sworn in on 20 October 1953 after the 1953 elections. It laid down its function after the formation of the Cabinet Adenauer III on 29 October 1957, which was formed following the 1957 elections.

During Adenauer's second administration, several cabinet members crossed the floor. In March 1956, following conflicts within the All-German Bloc/League of Expellees and Deprived of Rights (BHE), Theodor Oberländer (Federal Ministry of Displaced Persons, Refugees and War Victims) and Waldemar Kraft (Federal Minister for Special Affairs (water management)) joined the CDU. In June, three FDP cabinet members first joined FVP, then DP. This weakened their old parties, and contributed to a CDU/CSU victory in the 1957 elections with the to date only absolute majority for a single German parliamentary group, and Electoral wipeout for BHE.

== Composition ==
Portfolio	Minister	Took office	Left office	Party
Chancellor	Konrad Adenauer	20 October 1953	29 October 1957	CDU
Vice-Chancellor & Federal Minister of Economic Cooperation	Franz Blücher	20 October 1953	29 October 1957	FDP (1953–1956); FVP (1956–)
Federal Minister of Foreign Affairs	Konrad Adenauer	20 October 1953	6 June 1955	CDU
Federal Minister of Foreign Affairs	Heinrich von Brentano	6 June 1955	29 October 1957	CDU
Federal Minister of the Interior	Gerhard Schröder	20 October 1953	29 October 1957	CDU
Federal Minister of Justice	Fritz Neumayer	20 October 1953	16 October 1956	FDP (1953–1956); FVP (1956–)
Federal Minister of Justice	Hans-Joachim von Merkatz	16 October 1956	29 October 1957	DP
Federal Minister of Finance	Fritz Schäffer	20 October 1953	29 October 1957	CSU
Federal Minister of Economics	Ludwig Erhard	20 October 1953	29 October 1957	CDU
Federal Minister of Food, Agriculture, and Forestry	Heinrich Lübke	20 October 1953	29 October 1957	CDU
Federal Minister of Labour	Anton Storch	20 October 1953	29 October 1957	CDU
Federal Minister for Transport	Hans-Christoph Seebohm	20 October 1953	29 October 1957	DP
Federal Minister for Post and Communications	Hans Schuberth	1 April 1950	20 October 1953	CSU
Federal Minister of Public Housing	Hermann-Eberhard Wildermuth	20 October 1953	9 March 1952	FDP
Federal Minister of Public Housing	Fritz Neumayer	19 July 1952	20 October 1953	FDP
Federal Minister of All-German Affairs	Jakob Kaiser	20 October 1953	29 October 1957	CDU
Federal Minister for Affairs of the Federal Council	Heinrich Hellwege	20 October 1953	26 May 1955	DP
Federal Minister for Affairs of the Federal Council	Hans-Joachim von Merkatz	20 October 1953	29 October 1957	DP

Source: election.de
