= First Adenauer cabinet =

First West German government from 1949 to 1953

First Cabinet of Konrad Adenauer Cabinet Adenauer I
- 1st Cabinet of the Federal Republic of Germany
- 20 September 1949 – 6 October 1953 (until 20 October 1953 as caretaker government)
- Date formed: 20 September 1949
- Date dissolved: 20 October 1953 (4 years and 1 month)

People and organisations
- President: Theodor Heuss
- Chancellor: Konrad Adenauer
- Vice-Chancellor: Franz Blücher
- Member party: Christian Democratic Union; Christian Social Union; Free Democratic Party; German Party (DP)
- Status in legislature: Coalition majority
- Opposition party: Social Democratic Party; Communist Party; Bavaria Party; Economic Reconstruction Union; Centre Party; Deutsche Rechtspartei; South Schleswig Voters' Association
- Opposition leader: Kurt Schumacher † (SPD) (Note: until his death on 20 August 1952); Erich Ollenhauer (SPD) (Note: from 20 August 1952)

History
- Election: 1949 West German federal election
- Legislature term: 1st Bundestag
- Predecessor: Flensburg Government (1945); Allied Control Council (1945–1949)
- Successor: Adenauer II

The First Adenauer cabinet (German: Kabinett Adenauer I) was the 1st Government of Federal Republic of Germany in office from 20 September 1949 until 20 October 1953.

It was the first democratically-elected German cabinet in the aftermath of World War II. The cabinet was formed after the August 1949 elections. Konrad Adenauer reached an agreement on a coalition with the Free Democratic Party (FDP), German Party (DP) and his Christian Democratic Union (CDU) together with their Bavarian sister party Christian Social Union (CSU), setting the stage for Adenauer to become the first Chancellor of Germany, to be appointed by a German President that was not yet in office, but pre-determined in the same coalition agreement to be Theodor Heuss, the FDP leader. With support of third party delegates Heuss was elected in the indirect 1949 West German presidential election that included additional voters sent from state parliaments.

Apart from appointing the elected government, the role of a post-war German president is mostly representative. Adenauer was the leading figure, not only Chancellor, but also assumed the role of Federal Minister of Foreign Affairs as soon as the Allied occupation statute permitted to (re)establish the Auswärtiges Amt in March 1951. Franz Blücher (FDP) served as Vice-Chancellor of Germany and Federal Minister of Matters of the Marshall Plan.

Following the 6 September 1953 West German federal election, the new Bundestag convened on 6 October 1953, and the old administration was caretaker in transition. Adenauer soon formed the Second Adenauer cabinet.

== Composition ==
Portfolio	Minister	Took office	Left office	Party
Chancellor & Federal Minister of Foreign Affairs (Note: Adenauer was also Federal Minister of Foreign Affairs from March 15, 1951 after the office was re-established in 1951.)	Konrad Adenauer	20 September 1949	20 October 1953	CDU
Vice-Chancellor & Federal Minister of Matters of the Marshall Plan	Franz Blücher	20 September 1949	20 October 1953	FDP
Federal Minister of the Interior	Gustav Heinemann	20 September 1949	11 October 1950	CDU
Federal Minister of the Interior	Robert Lehr	11 October 1950	20 October 1953	CDU
Federal Minister of Justice	Thomas Dehler	20 September 1949	20 October 1953	FDP
Federal Minister of Finance	Fritz Schäffer	20 September 1949	20 October 1953	CSU
Federal Minister of Economics	Ludwig Erhard	20 September 1949	20 October 1953	CDU
Federal Minister of Food, Agriculture, and Forestry	Wilhelm Niklas	20 September 1949	20 October 1953	CSU
Federal Minister of Labour	Anton Storch	20 September 1949	20 October 1953	CDU
Federal Minister of Transport	Hans-Christoph Seebohm	20 September 1949	20 October 1953	DP
Federal Minister of Post and Communications	Hans Schuberth	20 September 1949	20 October 1953	CSU
Federal Minister of Public Housing	Hermann-Eberhard Wildermuth	20 September 1949	9 March 1952	FDP
Federal Minister of Public Housing	Fritz Neumayer	9 March 1952	20 October 1953	FDP
Federal Minister of Displaced Persons	Hans Lukaschek	20 September 1949	20 October 1953	CDU
Federal Minister of All-German Affairs	Jakob Kaiser	20 September 1949	20 October 1953	CDU
Federal Minister for Affairs of the Bundesrat of Germany	Heinrich Hellwege	20 September 1949	20 October 1953	DP
