= Victor-Emanuel Preusker =

German politician (1913-1991)

- Preusker in a 1953 photo of Adenauer II cabinet

Vice President of the Bundestag (on proposal of the DP faction)
- In office 23 April 1958 – 4 October 1960
- President: Eugen Gerstenmaier
- Preceded by: Position established
- Succeeded by: Position abolished

Minister for Housing
- In office 20 October 1953 – 22 October 1957
- Chancellor: Konrad Adenauer
- Preceded by: Fritz Neumayer
- Succeeded by: Paul Lücke

Member of the Bundestag
- In office 7 September 1949 – 17 October 1961
- Preceded by: Constituency established
- Succeeded by: Multi-member district
- Constituency: Wiesbaden (1949–1957); North Rhine-Westphalia state list (1957–1961)

Personal details
- Born: 25 February 1913 Berlin, Germany
- Died: 13 May 1991 (aged 78) Bonn, Germany
- Resting place: Burgfriedhof
- Party: Free Democratic Party (1948–1956; 1970–1991)
- Other political affiliations: NSDAP (1937–1945); FVP (1956–1957); DP (1958–1960); CDU (1960–1970)
- Children: 2
- Education: University of Vienna

Military service
- Allegiance: Nazi Germany
- Branch/service: Luftwaffe
- Years of service: 1940–1945
- Rank: Leutnant
- Unit: Kommando Nowotny

Victor-Emanuel Preusker (25 February 1913 – 13 May 1991) was a German politician who served as Federal Minister for Housing of West Germany from 1953 to 1957. He was a member of various political groups, mostly notably as a co-founder of the FVP in 1956 after leaving the FDP as part of the "Euler Group" (Note: The party ceased to exist when it was merged with the DP in 1947.) and as a member of the FDP.

Preusker was born in the German Empire, and studied economics, eventually achieving Dr. rer. pol. in 1940. He joined the Nazi Party in 1937, and was also a member of the SA and SS. He was a "racial specialist" in charge of the Aryanization of Austrian banks at Dresdner Bank from 1932 to 1938, and was also in the military as a leutnant of the Luftwaffe and a air traffic controller for Kommando Nowotny. He then joined the FDP in 1947 after some persuasion from August-Martin Euler, and was elected to the first Bundestag in 1949 for Wiesbaden. He served in the Bundestag until 1961, switching to state list for North Rhine-Westphalia in his last term and served as a Vice President of the Bundestag. His most notable appointment was as Federal Minister for Housing in Konrad Adenauer's 2nd cabinet. As minister, he pushed for economic liberalisation and was market-oriented. His term was dominated by the spike in need of housing after millions of East German refugees migrated to the country.

== Early life ==
=== Youth and education ===
He was born on 25 February 1913 in Berlin, which was then part of the German Empire. He was the son of a sergeant in the Guards Grenadiers of the Imperial German Army and a Reichsbank official. He attended the Herder Realgymnasium, and after graduating attended the Berlin School of Economics, studying business, economics, and political science. In 1937 he received his diploma. In 1940 he received his Dr. rer. pol. at the University of Vienna.

He began an apprenticeship with Danat-Bank in 1931, working there until it collapsed.

=== Nazi activities ===
Preusker joined the Nazi Party on 1 May 1937 (membership number 5,372,632), the day in which all government employees were forced to join the party or relinquish their positions. He had previously joined the SA, also called the Brownshirts, in 1933. After it was superseded in importance by the SS he joined the paramilitary organization from May to July 1933 and again from 1 February 1934 until the end of the war.

He initially worked at Dresdner Bank from 1932 to 1938, where he was a "racial specialist" in charge of the Aryanization of Austrian banks. He was said to have taken an active part in the liquidation of Jewish property. Since 1934 there he taught economics to the Young Leaders (Führernachwuchs). He took part in World War II as an Leutnant in the Luftwaffe, and then as an air traffic controller for Kommando Nowotny which worked with Messerschmitt Me 262s. He was briefly a prisoner-of-war by the Americans.

He was accused by Sefton Delmer of the Daily Express of being a "valiant Nazi" alongside other then-cabinet members including Theodor Oberländer and Waldemar Kraft in 1954, which Der Spiegel accused of being "sensational". The Stasi would later investigate him in an attempt to weaken West Germany, digging up most information about him which the Berlin Federal Archives later verified as true.

=== Afterwards ===
Immediately after the war he founded a wood processing company in Rotenburg an der Fulda. He was persuaded to join politics by the then district administrator of the Hersfeld district, August-Martin Euler, who he said "..persuaded me to work in the Liberal Democratic Party." He took up his first political post as General Secretary of the FDP in Hesse 1947. From 1949-1953 he was an economist at the Hardy & Co. Bank in Frankfurt am Main. Warmbold was also an editor for the Hessian FDP newspaper Deutscher Kurier during this time.

== Political career ==
=== Member of the Bundestag ===
In the first elections to the Bundestag, the 1949 West German federal election, for Wiesbaden by direktmandat and was a part of the national-liberal wing of the FDP. Then, starting in the 1957 West German federal election, he was instead elected by state list for North Rhine-Westphalia. He decided not to rerun for the 1961 West German federal election.

From 23 April 1958 to 4 October 1960 he was one of the Vice President of the Bundestag. Warmbold was also on the Committee on Money and Credit, the Committee on Economic Policy, Committee on Article 15 of the Basic Law, and the Committee on Reconstruction and Housing.

He changed his party multiple times during his years in the Bundestag. He was a member of the FDP until 1956, when he left the party with the so-called "Euler Group", which was led by August-Martin Euler. Later in 1956 he co-founded the FVP. The FVP merged with the DP on 1957, which he then joined in 1958, which he stayed as a member of until 1960. He then joined the CDU later that year, which he stayed at till 1970. Although he would no re-enter politics after 1970, he rejoined the FDP, where he remained at till his death.

After the Baden-Württemberg coalition between FDP/DVP and the SPD under Reinhold Maier in 1952, he said there would be "consequences against the Württemberg DVP" and said they had "not fought with uncompromising determination against Marxism and collectivism...to be stabbed in the back by the Württemberg DVP." In 1952 he also approved the Cartel Act, which was meant to regulate cartels in order to ensure fair competition as part of growing economic liberalism, as long as there was removal of the last obstacles to the market economy. He was also involved in the drafting of the Housing Act in 1950.

He proposed the so-called "Preusker Plan" in 1953, which was approved by then Minister for Economics Ludwig Erhard. The program provided for, among things, a reduction in food goods through the conclusion of additional trade agreements, tax cuts to reduce beverage costs, a financing program for used cars to promote motor vehicle production, and freedom of transfer for foreign capital after the London Debt Agreement was concluded. It was approved by the government on 27 April 1953, a few months before he would become minister with an investment of DM 1.2 billion.

=== Federal Minister for Housing ===
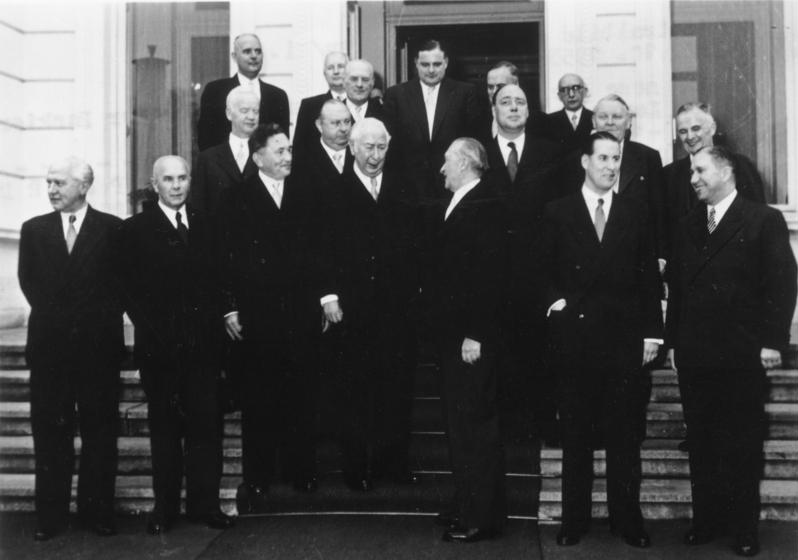
A 1953 picture of the entirety of the Adenauer II cabinet. He is on the 2nd row, 3rd from the left.

==== Previous rejection ====
Previously, he was heavily considered for the role of Federal Minister for Housing in 1952 after Hermann-Eberhard Wildermuth's passing, but the Gehlen Organization did wish for him to do, as they thought it was better for a latter date for possibilities. Although at the time it was unknown, he worked as an undercover agent and informant for the Gehlen Organization, which passed on information to the CIA about the Eastern Bloc alongside many other former Nazis. He supplied information about the workings of the FDP, and was described as a reliable contact with many relationships with people in Bonn, who he also utilized. He used the internal information to denounce left-liberal members of his party.

==== Term ====
He became minister on 20 October 1953 as part of Konrad Adenauer's 2nd cabinet. He left office on 22 October 1957, being replaced by Paul Lücke.

In order to create more housing, he announced that the administration would build over 2 million units during the next four years in 1953. He wanted to introduce legal entitlement in 1954 for builders who built a family home and provided an equity share of at least 30 percent, but it was not approved. More power was given to his office during this time, as in 1953 the duty to recognise companies and associations as organs of state housing, approve statutes, and approve or withdraw their recognition as long as they had an association in two or more countries, this was done previously by the Reich Minister of Labour since 1940.

He was considered, like his predecessors, to be market-oriented and as strengthening the private sectors initiatives. He pursued the liberalisation of the housing sector and wanted to promote housing using market-based methods, at a time when there was millions of East German refugees who need housing. He was able to push this liberalisation due to unanimous position of the government, pushing this through the First Federal Rent Act (1955) and Second Housing Act (1957), but it was never fully implemented.

=== Later political career ===
He was also the Wiesbaden FDP chairman for a brief time, and in this role helped put Erich Mix, who was also part of the Luftwaffe and a prominent Nazi, as second place on the party list for mayor of Wiesbaden in 1952, which he won with the support of former comrades. From 12 January 1953 to 11 May 1954 he was one of the vice-chairmans of the Committee on the Common Market of the Common Assembly of the European Coal and Steel Community alongside Maan Sassen. From 1958 to 1971, in his longest-serving position, he was President of the Central Association of German House and Land Owners. In this role, his early focus was on the integration of the housing industry into the market economy. However, later on, he downplayed things such as the tenant protection law, and said only specific regions needed it. Also after leaving the Bundestag he was the co-owner of the bank Preusker & Thelen in Bonn from 1963 to 1970.

== Death ==
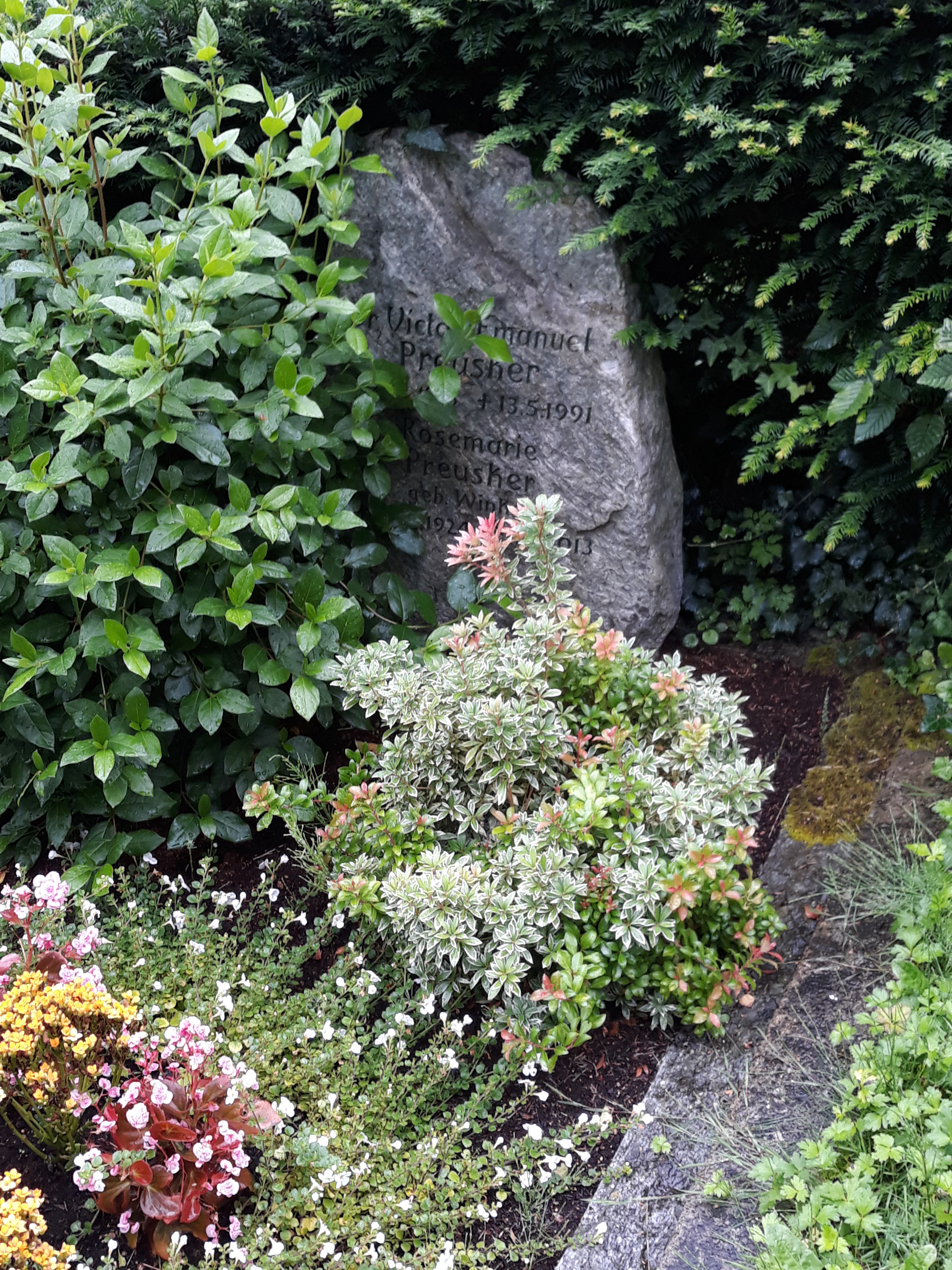
The grave of Preusker at Burgfriedhof located in Bad Godesberg, Bonn

He died on 13 May 1991 in Bonn.

== Honours and awards ==
- Honorary President of the Central Association of German House and Land Owners in Düsseldorf (Zentralverbandes Deutscher Haus- und Grundeigentümer)
- Grand Cross of the Order of Merit of the Federal Republic of Germany
