= August-Martin Euler =

German politician

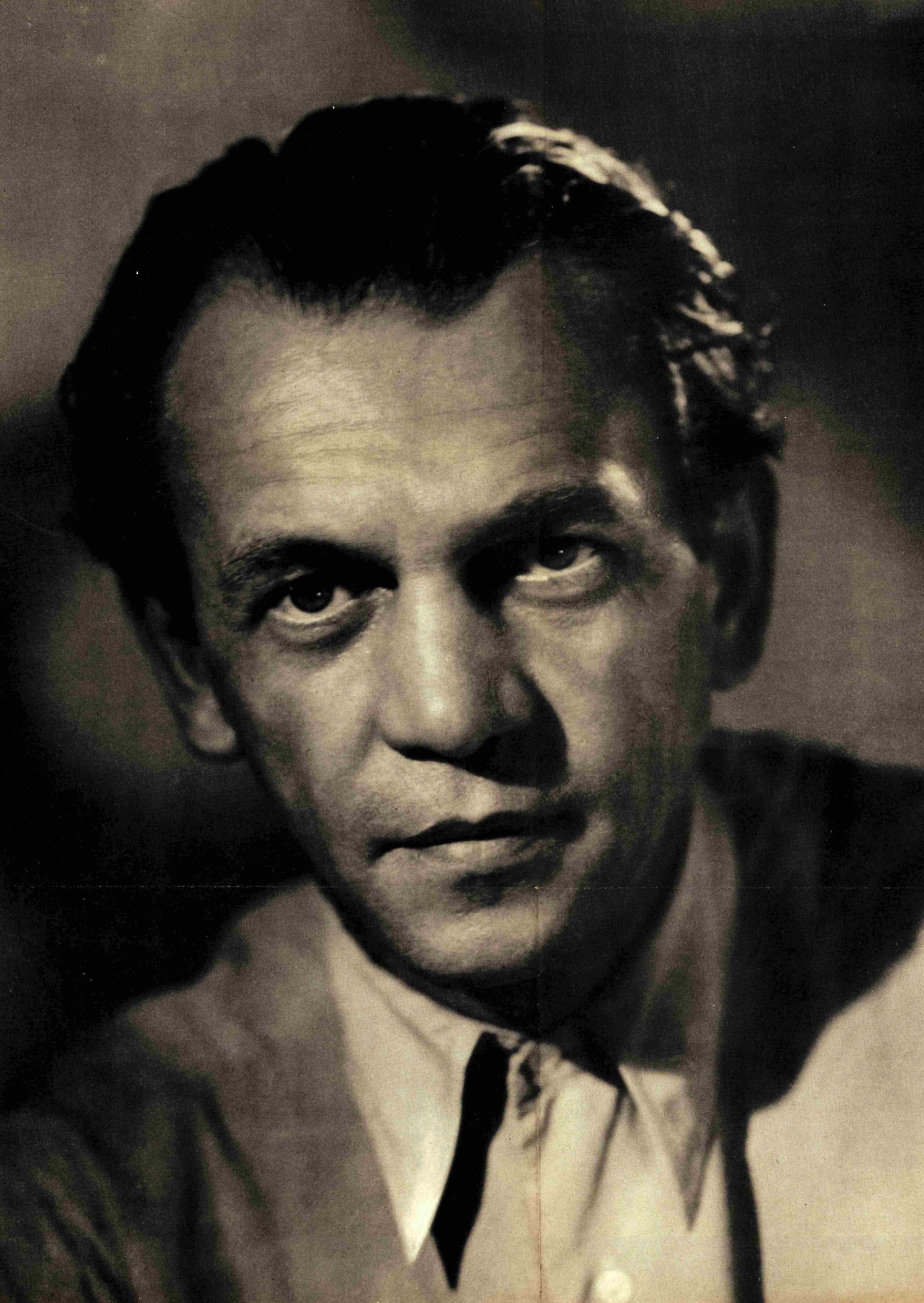

Leader of the FDP in the Bundestag
- In office 10 January 1951 – 6 May 1952
- Preceded by: Hermann Schäfer
- Succeeded by: Hermann Schäfer

Member of the Bundestag; from Hesse
- In office 7 September 1949 – 10 September 1958
- Preceded by: Constituency established
- Succeeded by: Ludwig Schneider
- Constituency: Fritzlar-Homberg (1949–1957); State list (1957–1958)

Member of the Landtag of Hesse
- In office 1 December 1954 – 8 January 1955
- Preceded by: Multi-member district
- Succeeded by: Albert Derichsweiler
- Constituency: State list
- In office 1 December 1950 – 12 January 1951
- Preceded by: Multi-member district
- Succeeded by: Wilhelm Seipel
- Constituency: State list
- In office 15 July 1946 – 26 June 1947
- Preceded by: Multi-member district
- Succeeded by: Friedrich Ulm
- Constituency: State list

Personal details
- Born: 9 May 1908 Kassel, Germany
- Died: 4 February 1966 (aged 57) Brussels, Belgium
- Resting place: Ohlsdorf Cemetery
- Party: German Party (after 1957)
- Other political affiliations: FDP (1945–1956); FVP (1956–1957)
- Education: Marburg University

August-Martin Euler (9 May 1908 – 4 February 1966) was a German politician (FDP, later FVP and German Party). He was state chairman of the FDP in Hesse from 1947 to 1956, a member of the German Bundestag from 1949 to 1958, and chairman of the FDP parliamentary group there from 1951 to 1952. In 1956, he led a breakaway from the FDP faction, the so-called Euler Group.

== Life and career ==
After graduating from high school, Euler studied law in Marburg and then worked in various legal positions from 1936 to 1944. Since 1939, he has been the general representative for chemistry in Berlin as legal counsel for IG Farben. Euler, who had undergone training with the police, was drafted into the SS Police Regiment 2 Brandenburg on 29 November 1944, as a police officer for the Waffen-SS.

In 1945–46, he was district administrator in the Hersfeld district. He then worked as a lawyer. In 1953, he belonged to Club 53 around Arnold Bode. In September 1958, he became Director General of the Supply Department of EURATOM.

He was the father of the later Hamburg FDP parliamentary group leader, Maja Stadler-Euler.

== Political party ==
Euler was one of the co-founders of the Liberal Democratic Party, later the FDP, in Kassel in 1945 and then throughout Hesse on 29 December 1945. In 1946, he initially became state manager, and in June 1947, he became state chairman of the FDP as the successor to Georg Ludwig Fertsch. He held the office until he left the party in 1956. At the founding party conference of the FDP in Heppenheim, Euler was elected to the executive board of the federal party. At the 1949 federal party conference of the FDP in Bremen, he wanted to enforce a commitment to rearmament but failed due to the anti-militarist sentiment of the majority of delegates.

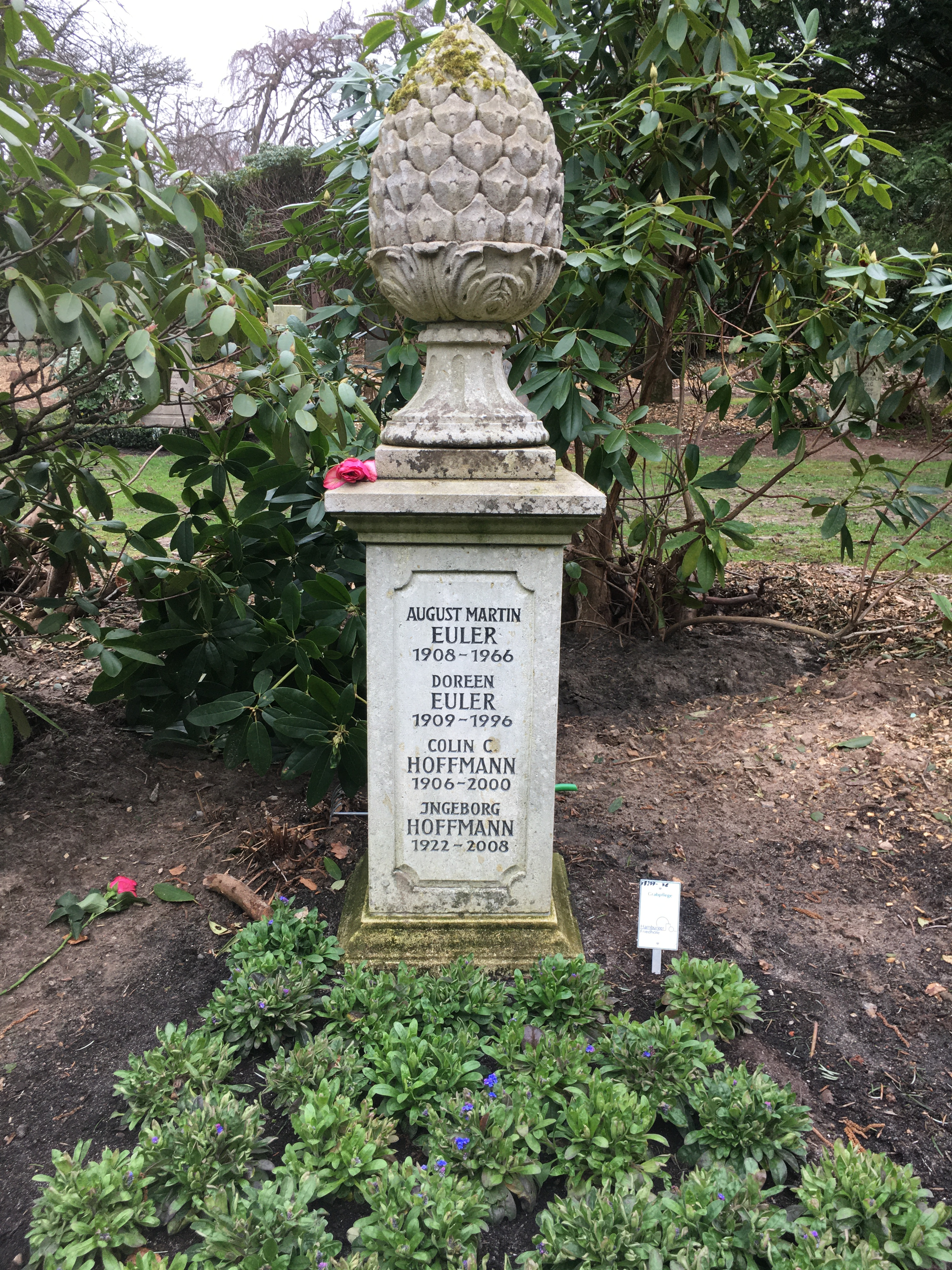
Image of Euler's grave

At the meeting of the Federal Main Committee of the FDP on 21 September 1950, he spoke out in favor of resolving not only the incompatibility of membership in the FDP with membership in the Association of those Persecuted by the Nazi Regime but also with membership in the German Peace Society (DFG). While the first demand was passed with a clear majority because of the KPD's decisive influence on the VVN, the proposal regarding the peace society failed; after all, Harald Abatz, an FDP member, was the federal chairman of the DFG. At the federal party conference in September 1951 in Munich, he ran against the previous deputy federal chairman, Hermann Schäfer, and was narrowly defeated by 114 votes to 139.

Together with Hans-Joachim von Merkatz, Euler advocated a rigorous end to denazification in 1950. Both sought to exonerate the so-called main culprits and those accused of all current or impending sanctions at the time.

Euler was one of the strictest representatives of the citizen bloc orientation of the FDP. In 1952, he called for the Baden-Württemberg FDP/DVP, which he described as demi-Marxists, to be excluded from the party after Reinhold Maier entered into a coalition with the SPD in the southwestern state.

The FDP's coalition change in North Rhine-Westphalia in 1956 from the CDU to the SPD ultimately led to a group of FDP members and MPs under Euler's leadership breaking away from the party in February 1956 and founding the Free People's Party (FVP). With the FVP, Euler came to the German Party (DP) in March 1957.

== Member of the Bundestag ==
Euler was a member of the state parliament in Hesse in 1946–47, 1950–51, and 1954–55. He was also parliamentary group leader there in 1946–47 and 1954–55. From 1947 to 1949, he sat on the Economic Council of the United Economic Area for Hesse, where he was deputy chairman of the FDP parliamentary group. Euler was a member of the German Bundestag from 1949 to 1958. In the 1949 federal election, he was directly elected to parliament in the Fritzlar-Homberg federal constituency with 27.8% of the vote, but with a clear lead over the SPD candidate (22.9%), and was able to retain the constituency in 1953. In 1949, he initially spoke out in favor of a joint faction with the German Party.

Initially deputy parliamentary group leader, he was elected chairman of the FDP parliamentary group on 10 January 1951, with 23 to 22 votes against the previous incumbent, Hermann Schäfer.

Just one year later, however, he no longer stood for office. In his first electoral term, he was also chairman of the expert committee for the reorganization of the federal territory, in which he represented far-reaching demands for a reduction in the number of German states. In 1953, he became deputy group leader again.

Together with the so-called ministerial wing (including the four previous FDP ministers of the Adenauer II cabinet: Franz Blücher, Fritz Neumayer, Victor-Emanuel Preusker and Hermann Schäfer), Euler, after whom these 16 MPs were also called the Euler Group, left on 23 December. February 1956, the FDP parliamentary group. The group founded the FVP, which merged with the German Party a year later.

Towards the end of the electoral term, he became chairman of the Bundestag Committee on Nuclear Issues for the DP/FVP parliamentary group. In the 1957 federal election, he returned to parliament on the DP's Hessian state list. He resigned his mandate on 10 September 1958, when he moved to EURATOM. He was a member of the first Federal Assembly in 1949 and the second in 1954.

== Literature ==
- Jochen Lengemann: MdL Hesse. 1808–1996. Biographical index (= Political and parliamentary history of the state of Hesse. Vol. 14 = Publications of the Historical Commission for Hesse. Vol. 48, 7). Elwert, Marburg 1996, ISBN 3-7708-1071-6, p. 123.
- Andrea von Lucke: The crisis of 1956. The split in the FDP parliamentary group under the leadership of August Martin Euler and the consequences for the Hessian FDP. In: Yearbook for Liberalism Research. Vol. 20 ( 2008), pp. 97–113.
- Maria Neumann: In dubious company? Adolf Arndt and August-Martin Euler - Two actors in the politics of the past at the first documenta in 1955. In: Journal of Historical Studies. Vol. 72 (2024), No. 2, pp. 139–160.
