= Thomas Dehler =

German politician (1897–1967)

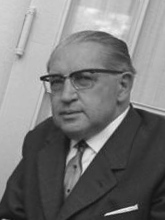
- Dehler in 1964

Minister of Justice
- In office 20 September 1949 – 20 October 1953
- Chancellor: Konrad Adenauer
- Preceded by: Inaugural
- Succeeded by: Fritz Neumayer

Vice President of the Bundestag (on proposal of the FDP-group)
- In office 1960–1967
- Preceded by: Max Becker
- Succeeded by: Walter Scheel

Member of the Bundestag
- In office 7 September 1949 – 21 July 1967

Personal details
- Born: 14 December 1897 Lichtenfels, Bavaria, Germany
- Died: 21 July 1967 (aged 69) Wiesenttal, Bavaria, West Germany
- Party: Free Democratic Party
- Education: Ludwig-Maximilians-Universität München; University of Würzburg; University of Freiburg
- Profession: Lawyer

Thomas Dehler (14 December 1897 – 21 July 1967) was a German politician. He was the Federal Republic of Germany's first Minister of Justice (1949–1953) and chairman of Free Democratic Party (1954–1957).

== Early life ==
Dehler was born in Lichtenfels in Upper Franconia, Bavaria. After graduating from grammar school in 1916, he fought in World War I.

After the war, he studied medicine but soon switched to law and political science, which he studied at the Ludwig-Maximilians-Universität München, the University of Freiburg, and the University of Würzburg. He passed his state examinations in 1920 and 1923, respectively. In 1920, he attained his doctorate with the dissertation "The statement of grounds in penal verdicts". In these days (1923), he also became co-founder of an anti-antisemitic student fraternity "Südmark-Monachia" in Munich. In remembrance of his studies at the University of Würzburg, he later, in 1948, joined the student fraternity "Humanitas" Würzburg as an Alter Herr (alumnus).

After 1923, he worked as a solicitor in Munich and, after 1925, in Bamberg.

In 1925, Dehler had married Irma Frank, a Jewish woman.

== Political and religious affiliations ==
In 1920, Dehler joined the liberal German Democratic Party (DDP) and in 1926 was elected district party chairman in Bamberg. In 1924 he was among the founding members of the Reichsbanner Schwarz-Rot-Gold, a paramilitary group founded in defence of the Weimar Republic. In 1930, the DDP merged with the Young German Order into German State Party, of which Dehler remained a member until its dissolution in 1933.

Dehler grew up in a Roman Catholic family, but in 1927 he joined the masonic lodge Zur Verbrüderung an der Regnitz in Bamberg. After the lodge had been banned under the Nazi regime, Dehler was among its refounders in 1946 and remained a member until his death. In his latter years, Dehler was a vocal opponent of Political Catholicism.

== Nazi regime ==
After the advent of the Nazi regime, and especially after the passing of the Nuremberg Laws, pressure from Nazi authorities and professional bodies was put on Dehler to divorce his wife. Dehler however resisted the pressure and stood by his wife and his Jewish clients and even took up cases for opponents of the regime. Subsequently, the Nazi periodical Der Stürmer dubbed him "a real comrade of the Jews". In 1938, he was arrested because of contacts to resistance circles.

In World War II, Dehler again joined the army but after a few months was expelled as "unworthy" because of his marriage. In 1944, he was arrested again and sentenced to forced labour for Organisation Todt. However, he was released from duty after only four weeks.

== Post-war period ==
At the conclusion of the war, Bavaria was occupied by American troops. In June 1945, the new military government appointed Dehler Landrat of the district of Bamberg, which he remained until 1946.

He also served in the legal system, as district attorney at the Oberlandesgericht Bamberg (1945/47), as chief prosecutor at the court of cassation at the Bavarian ministry for political liberation (1946/47) and as president of the Oberlandesgericht Bamberg (1947/49).

In 1946, Dehler was one of the founding members of the Free Democratic Party (FDP) in Bavaria. Dehler was elected party chairman and remained in that office until 1956. In 1948, when FDP organised on a federal level at its founding convention in Heppenheim, Dehler was elected into the federal board.

In 1946, Dehler was a member of the Constituent Assembly of Bavaria. From 1946 to 1949 he was a member of the Bavarian parliament.

In 1947/48 he was a member of the Länderrat, a parliamentary body representing the three states in the American zone of occupation. In 1948/49 he was a member of the Parlamentarischer Rat, in which delegates from the states of the American, British and French zones assembled to draw up a constitution for a West German federal state. Dehler was one of three members of the redaction committee. Though Dehler was not completely satisfied with the result - the Basic Law passed on 23 May 1949 - he supported its ratification and harshly criticised any opposition to its ratification in the Bavarian parliament.

== Federal Minister of Justice ==
In the Federal elections held in August 1949, Dehler was elected into the Bundestag, the new federal parliament. The FDP party formed a coalition with the Christian Democratic Union (CDU), the Christian Social Union (CSU) and the German Party (DP). CDU chairman Konrad Adenauer was elected Federal Chancellor, while FDP chairman Theodor Heuss was elected Federal President. On 20 September, Dehler was one of three FDP politicians to be appointed to Adenauer's cabinet and served as Minister of Justice.

As minister, Dehler was mostly concerned with the establishment of a judicial system within a democratic republic. In this context he attempt to limit the independence of the Constitutional Court, which resulted in misgivings between him and Hermann Höpker-Aschoff, a fellow FDP politician and after 1951 the Court's first president.

Dehler was also opposed attempts to reintroduce the death penalty, which the Basic Law had abolished in 1949 for Hitler/Nazi enemies. Such proposals were first voiced by the Bavaria Party in 1950 and discussed within the CDU/CSU in 1952. In his opposition, Dehler argued not so much against the death penalty itself but in favour of a loyal approach towards the young constitution. His opposition has also been interpreted as an attempt to shield German war criminals, an important constituency to which the FDP appealed by repeatedly demanding the release of all "so-called war criminals" from prison. While Dehler's motives remain unclear, Dehler in 1951 did intervene in proceedings against SS-Obergruppenführer Werner Best, resulting in the prosecutors dropping their charges. Best later resurfaced as one of the protagonists of the Naumann affair.

Dehler initially supported Adenauer's western policies - integration into NATO and rapprochement with France - as a means to gain enough international trust and weight to attain German reunification. However, as Adenauer's policies progressed, Dehler grew skeptical towards this approach and towards Adenauer's intentions, later accusing the Chancellor of having deceived him. Notable points of disagreement were the Saar issue, on which Adenauer cautiously tried to avoid conflicts with France, which tried to keep the region as its protectorate, without giving up German claims, and the Stalin Notes of 1952, which Dehler considered a sincere offer worth exploring further.

== Internal party politics and Naumann affair ==
In the early 1950s, the FDP was divided between different ideologies and strategies. The "determined liberals" included Dehler, Reinhold Maier of Württemberg-Baden and others and considered the FDP as a strictly-liberal party, including both left-wing liberals and national liberals. Others conceived of it as a party of "national gathering" that should appeal more to the right wing of the political spectrum and integrate it into the democratic system; the chief proponent of the latter strategy was Friedrich Middelhauve of North Rhine-Westphalia.

In this context, Werner Naumann, formerly an aide to the Nazi regime's Propaganda Minister Joseph Goebbels, and other former high-ranking Nazi officials, conspired in an attempt to infiltrate the FDP and gradually turn it into a National Socialist force, especially targeting the North Rhine-Westphalia branch. This group came to be known as the Naumann Circle. They were warmly welcomed by Middelhauve, whose co-operation went so far as to present a German programme, a nationalist manifesto penned by the conspirators at the federal party convention in November 1952. However, the draft was rejected in favour of a liberal manifesto, and the conspirators were arrested by British authorities in January 1953. Before the arrests, the British authorities had consulted three high-ranking FDP politicians (Theodor Heuss as Federal President, Franz Blücher as Vice-Chancellor and federal party chairman and Dehler as Minister of Justice), who had advised them to intervene. Dehler, along with Fritz Neumayer and Alfred Onnen, formed an internal fact-finding committee that reproached parts of the North Rhine-Westphalia branch.

== Dismissal as minister ==
The Federal elections of September 1953 resulted in large gains for CDU/CSU, while its coalition partners sustained slight losses. Adenauer missed an absolute majority by only one seat but to ensure a solid majority for his policy of Western integration and rearmament, all coalition partners were retained. However, because of the Minister of Justice's increasing differences with the Chancellor and because of "a serious breach of confidentiality" in the context of the Naumann affair, Dehler was replaced by Fritz Neumayer. This move met little opposition by fellow ministers and was supported President Heuss and Höpker-Aschoff, both fellow FDP members.

== Party leader ==
Immediately after his departure from government, Dehler was elected chairman of FDP's parliamentary group and of the federal party, replacing Hermann Schäfer and Vice-Chancellor Franz Blücher, respectively. The reasoning behind this move was that the FDP deputies blamed their party's losses in the election on a lack of distinctive profile and now choosing an opponent of Adenauer as their leader. Dehler now combined two central party offices for the first time since 1949. Even though the FDP remained the CDU/CSU's partner in government, the party now vocally addressed disagreements. Notable issues were the Saar issue, which hit its peak in the mid-fifties, and proposed changes to electoral law.

In 1954, Dehler played a vital role in Bavarian politics again, engineering a coalition between his party, the Social Democrats, the Bavaria Party and the refugee party BHE. All parties in the Bavarian parliament except the largest - the Christian Social Union – combined to elect Social Democrat Wilhelm Hoegner as prime minister. A major issue for Dehler was the replacing Bavaria's system of denominational elementary schools, which had been restored after the fall of the Nazi regime, with interdenominational institutions. The coalition indeed reformed the training of elementary school teachers but proved unstable. After the CDU/CSU's triumphal victory at the Federal elections of 1957, the coalition fell apart when the BHE and the Bavaria Party withdrew their ministers.

In 1956, Dehler supported a group of young FDP politicians dubbed "Young Turks" – Erich Mende, Walter Scheel and others – as they ousted the prime minister of in North Rhine-Westphalia, Karl Arnold by a vote of no confidence. Arnold had governed as head of a CDU-FDP coalition but now the FDP switched their allegiance to elect the Social Democrat Fritz Steinhoff. However, as in its Bavarian counterpart, success was short-lived, as CDU gained an absolute majority in the 1958 state elections and returned to government with Franz Meyers. The immediate and lasting result of the coup was the resignation of Middlehauve and end to any nationalist strategies.

It was in 1956 as well that Dehler made his decisive move against Adenauer: On 23 September 1956, just a year before the next federal elections, the FDP parliamentary group in the Bundestag decided to leave the coalition with CDU/CSU. However, sixteen deputies, including all four of the party's government ministers, refused to accept this move, split from their party and founded the Free People's Party (FVP), which continued to support Adenauer's government.

Dehler had hoped to weaken Adenauer's government and establish his party as a "third force" but the Federal elections of September 1957 resulted in a triumphant victory for CDU and CSU, who won an absolute majority in parliament and henceforth could govern without the support from any other party. After this defeat, Dehler reluctantly resigned as chairman of party and parliamentary group. He was replaced by Reinhold Maier and Max Becker, respectively.

Though an immediate failure, Dehler's strategy has been credited with enabling the FDP to survive beyond the 1950s, when most smaller parties disappeared from the political scene.

== Later life ==
Dehler remained a member of parliament until his death and also remained a vocal critic of Adenauer, especially in the field of German policy by calling for renewed attempts to seek reunification via the Soviet Union. Dehler also frequently participated in debates regarding legal issues. He was an unyielding opponent of attempts to exempt Nazi crimes from the statute of limitations by citing basic legal principles. The Bundestag decided in favour of tolling and eventually, years after Dehler, of deciding to exempt all kinds of murder from the statute of limitations.

From 1957 to 1961, he chaired both the Bundestag's committee for nuclear energy and water management as well as his party's working committee on foreign policy and defence.

After the death of Max Becker, Dehler was elected vice-president of the Bundestag on 28 September 1960, which he remained until his death. In 1960 to 1961, he was the Bundestag's representative in front of the Federal Constitutional Court in a case and after 1963, he chaired the Bundestag's committee charged with nominating federal judges.

On 21 July 1967, Dehler died of a heart attack while swimming at a bath at Streitberg, Upper Franconia.

== Legacy ==
In 1993, the federal FDP honoured Dehler's memory by naming their headquarters in Bonn Thomas-Dehler-Haus. When government moved to Berlin in 1999, the FDP new headquarters were also named in Dehler's honour. The Thomas-Dehler-Stiftung, a foundation affiliated with the Bavarian FDP, is also named in his honour.

== Works ==
- Die Begründung des Strafurteils, Dissertation, Würzburg 1920.
- Die Rechtsentwicklung in der Sowjetischen Besatzungszone, Bundesverband der Deutschen Industrie, Köln 1952.
- "Das Parlament im Wandel der Staatsidee", in: Macht und Ohnmacht der Parlamente, Stuttgart, 1965, S. 9ff.
- Lob auf Franken: Ein Bekenntnis, Glock u. Lutz, Nürnberg 1967
- "Parlament und Presse", in: Zeitungsverlag und Zeitschriften-Verlag Heft 43/44 (1965), S. 1990f.
- Reden und Aufsätze (postum), Westdeutscher Verlag, 1969.
