= Hermann Schäfer =

German politician

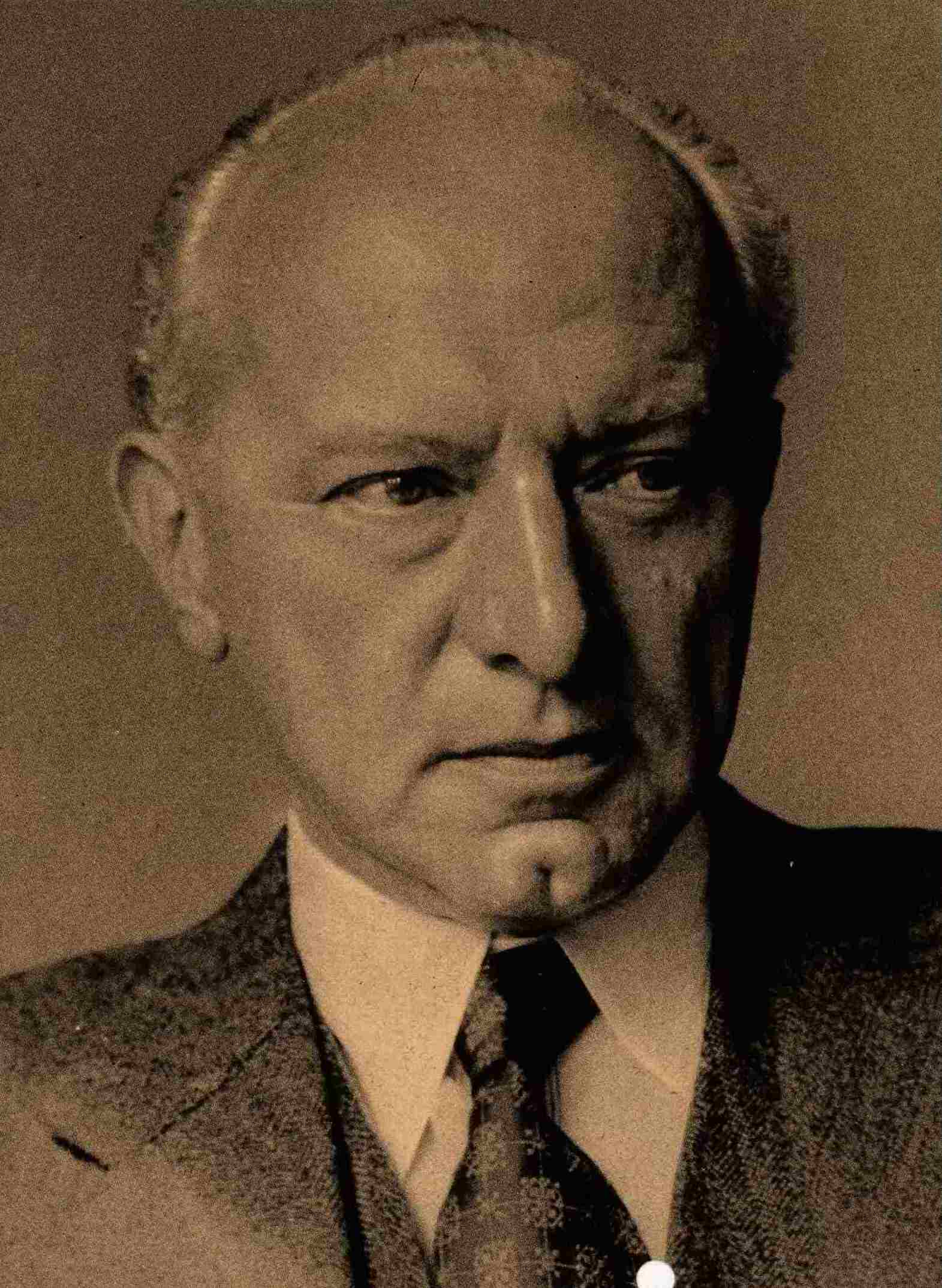

Leader of the FDP in the Bundestag
- In office 1949–1951
- Preceded by: Theodor Heuss
- Succeeded by: August-Martin Euler

Personal details
- Born: 6 April 1892 Remscheid, North Rhine-Westphalia, Germany
- Died: 26 March 1966 (aged 73) Bad Godesberg, Bonn, Germany

Hermann Rudolf Schäfer (6 April 1892 in Remscheid – 26 May 1966 in Bad Godesberg) was a German politician (DDP, FDP, Free People's Party, DP). From 1953 to 1956, he was Federal Minister for Special Tasks.

== Education and career ==
After graduating from high school in 1910, Schäfer, the son of a factory owner, studied political science, economics, and newspaper studies in Leipzig and Heidelberg, which he completed in 1914 with a doctorate. phil. and a dissertation on the subject of "The Press of the German Labor Movement." During his studies, he became a member of the SBV Nordalbingia Leipzig in 1910 and the Schwarzburgbund association Hercynia Heidelberg in 1911.

He worked as an editor for a short time and then took part in the First World War as a soldier from 1914 to 1918. After his release from captivity in 1920, he served as a managing director until 1934, and later as executive board member of the Association of Senior Executives (Vela). From 1935 he worked as an employee at the Hanseatic Replacement Fund from 1826; in 1946 he became its director. During the Second World War he was a captain in the reserve at the General Plenipotentiary for Technical Communications (GBN) in Berlin.

== Political party ==
Before the First World War, Schäfer had already become a member of the left-liberal Progressive People's Party. Released from captivity, he joined the German Democratic Party (DDP) in 1920, where he was a member of the Reich Executive Committee from 1925 to 1932.

After the end of the Second World War, Schäfer took part in the founding of the Free Democrats Party in September 1945, which would become the Hamburg regional branch of the FDP. In 1946, he was elected deputy chairman of the FDP regional association in Hamburg. In 1947, he was elected deputy chairman of the FDP in the British-occupied zone. From 1950 to 1955, he was deputy federal chairman of the FDP. He was a member of the FDP federal executive board from 1949 to 1955. Although he was considered an exponent of the left wing, he left the FDP on 23 February 1956, with the so-called Euler Group, which was otherwise considered to be part of the right wing of the party, and became a co-founder of the FVP, which joined forces after just one year when the DP united. In 1961, he returned to the FDP.

== MP ==
Schäfer was a member of the Cologne city council from 1925 to 1932 and was parliamentary group leader of the DDP from 1929. From 1947 on, he was a member of the Zone Advisory Council for the British Occupation Zone and, in 1948/49, of the Parliamentary Council and its vice president. In this capacity, he drafted the Basic Law on 23 May 1949, together with Konrad Adenauer and Adolph Schönfelder. The constitutional document therefore bears his signature.

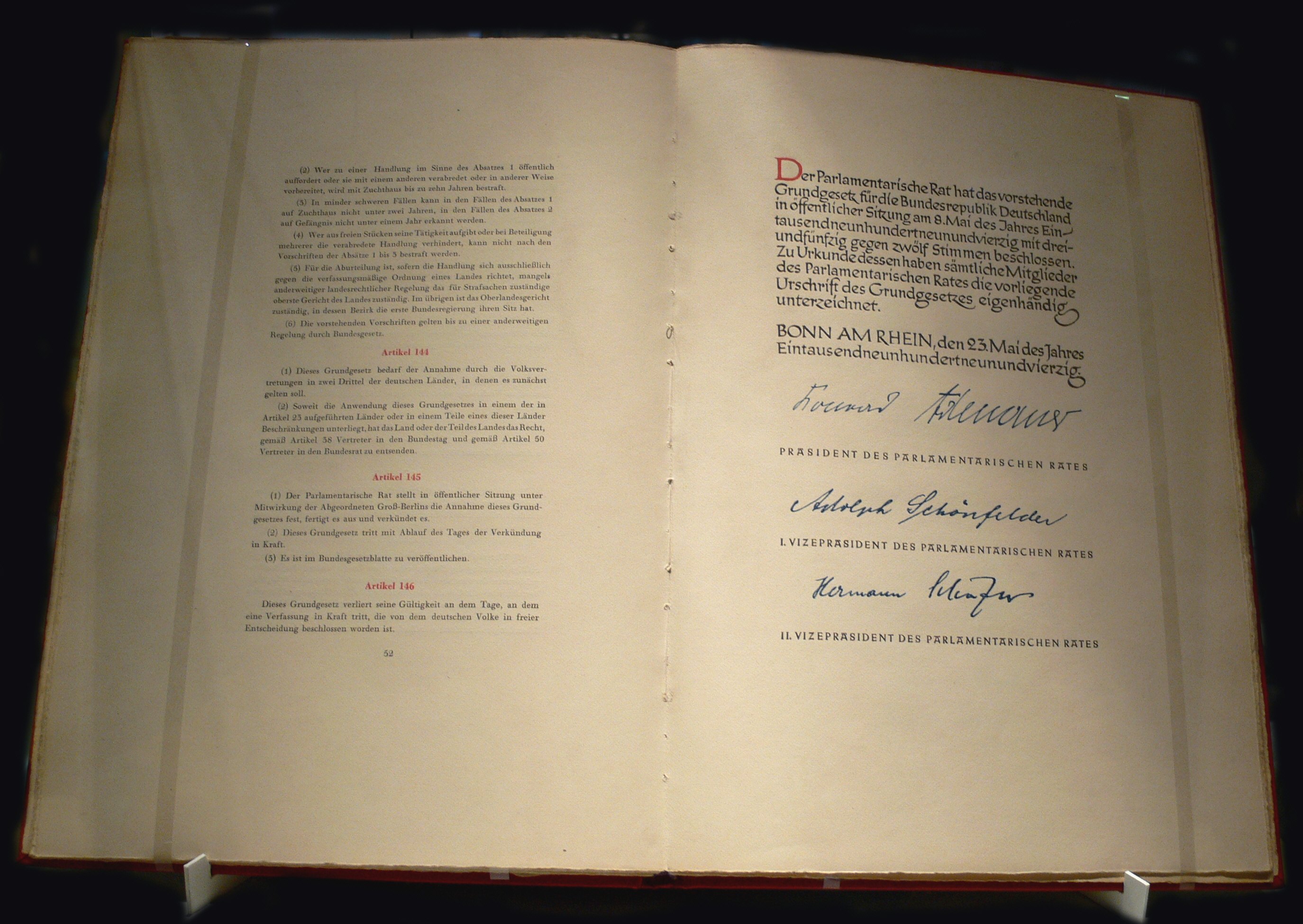
Image of said document. The third signature is his

Schäfer headed the Parliamentary Council commission, which was supposed to examine which of the four candidate cities (Bonn, Frankfurt am Main, Kassel, or Stuttgart) should receive the provisional headquarters of the federal bodies. The Commission suggested that the Parliamentary Council choose between Bonn and Frankfurt; Kassel and Stuttgart were found unsuitable.

From 1949 to 1957, Schäfer was a member of the German Bundestag and its vice president from 1949 to 1953. In addition, Schäfer was also a member of the Parliamentary Assembly of the Council of Europe from 1950 to 1953. He was also chairman of the FDP parliamentary group from 12 September 1949 to 10 January 1951, and from 6 May 1952 to 1953, and in the meantime, its deputy chairman.

On 23 February 1956 Schäfer left the FDP parliamentary group together with the so-called “Euler Group” and initially served as a non-attached member of the Bundestag. On 15 March 1956 he became a member of the “Democratic Working Group” formed by the Euler Group, which renamed itself the “FVP Bundestag faction” on 26 June 1956, and finally joined the DP in the DP/FVP faction on 14 March 1957.

Hermann Schäfer entered the Bundestag in 1949 via the Hamburg state list and in 1953 as a directly elected member of the Hamburg IV constituency.

== Public offices ==
From 20 October 1953 to 16 October 1956 Schäfer served in the federal government led by Chancellor Konrad Adenauer as Federal Minister for Special Tasks and responsible for German medium-sized businesses.

In 1957, Schäfer was appointed Federal Commissioner for Employees and Freelance Professions.

== Other engagement ==
From 1962 to 1967, he was a member of the advisory board of the Friedrich Naumann Foundation. From 1964 to 1966, Schäfer was chairman of the Society for Freedom—friends and supporters of the Friedrich Naumann Foundation.

== Honors ==
• 1956: Grand Cross of the Order of Merit of the Federal Republic of Germany

== Literature ==
- Jürgen Frölich: Hermann Schäfer (1892–1966), Federal Minister. In: Portal Rhenish History.
- Rudolf Vierhaus, Ludolf Herbst (ed.), Bruno Jahn (collaborator): A biographical handbook of the members of the German Bundestag. 1949–2002. Vol. 2: N–Z. Attachment. KG Saur, Munich 2002, ISBN 3-598-23782-0, p. 723.

== Other websites ==
- Literature by and about Hermann Schäfer in the German National Library catalogue
