= Free People's Party =

Free People's Party may refer to:

- Free People's Party (Germany), 1956-1957
- Farmers' Party (Denmark), initially called the Free People's Party
