= Federal Ministry for Housing, Urban Development and Building =

Ministry in the government of the Federal Republic of Germany

- Bundesministerium für Wohnen, Stadtentwicklung und Bauwesen

Agency overview
- Formed: 20 September 1949 (as the Federal Ministry for Reconstruction); 8 December 2021 (re-established; as the Federal Ministry for Housing, Urban Development, and Building)
- Dissolved: 27 October 1998 (then as the Federal Ministry for Spatial Planning, Building and Urban Development)
- Jurisdiction: Government of Germany
- Headquarters: Berlin
- Employees: 493 (2025)
- Annual budget: €7.75 billion (2026)
- Minister responsible: Verena Hubertz, Federal Minister for Housing, Urban Development and Building
- Agency executives: Sören Bartol, Parliamentary State Secretary; Sabine Poschmann, Parliamentary State Secretary
- Website: www.bmwsb.bund.de

The Federal Ministry for Housing, Urban Development and Building (German: Bundesministerium für Wohnen, Stadtentwicklung und Bauwesen, pronounced [ˈbʊndəsminɪsˌteːʁiʊm fyːɐ̯ ˈvoːnən ˈʃtatʔɛntˌvɪklʊŋ ʔʊnt ˈbaʊˌveːzn̩]; abbreviated BMWSB) is a cabinet-level ministry of the Federal Republic of Germany. It is headquartered in Berlin. The current minister is Verena Hubertz, of the Social Democratic Party. The Federal Ministry existed between 1949 and 1998 and was re-established in December 2021.

== History ==
In 1949 the ministry was founded under the name Federal Ministry for Reconstruction. In 1950 the ministry renamed in Federal Ministry for Housing and in 1961 was it renamed in Federal Ministry for Housing, Urban Development and Regional Planning. From 1965 the name of the ministry was the Federal Ministry for Housing and Urban Development (or 1969–72 with the reverse order of the two terms), until it finally received the name Federal Ministry for Regional Planning, Building and Urban Development in 1972, which it bore until its dissolution in 1998.

In 1998, the ministry was merged with the Federal Ministry of Transport in to the Federal Ministry of Transport, Building and Housing by an organizational decree from Chancellor Gerhard Schröder. Its first Minister was Franz Müntefering (SPD).

From 2013 to 2018 the construction area was affiliated to the Federal Ministry for the Environment, from 2018 to 2021 it belonged to the Federal Ministry of the Interior.

With the organizational decree of December 8, 2021, Chancellor Olaf Scholz ordered on the day of his appointment and with immediate effect that a Federal Ministry for Housing, Urban Development and Building be re-established.

== Federal Ministers ==
Political Party: FDP CDU SPD

Portrait	Name (Born-Died)	Party	Term of Office		Chancellor (Cabinet)
Federal Minister for Reconstruction (1949) Federal Minister for Housing (1950–1961) Federal Minister for Housing, Urban Development and Regional Planning (1961–1965)
1	Eberhard Wildermuth (1890–1952)	FDP	20 September 1949	9 March 1952	Adenauer (I)
2	Fritz Neumayer (1917–1989)	FDP	19 July 1952	20 October 1953	Adenauer (I)
3	Victor-Emanuel Preusker (1913–1991)	FDP	20 October 1953	29 October 1957	Adenauer (II)
4	Paul Lücke (1914–1976)	CDU	29 October 1957	26 October 1965	Adenauer (III • IV); Erhard (I)
Federal Minister for Housing and Urban Development (1965–1969) Federal Minister for Urban Development and Housing (1969–1972)
5	Ewald Bucher (1914–1991)	FDP	26 October 1965	28 October 1966	Erhard (II)
6	Bruno Heck (1917–1989)	CDU	8 November 1966	30 November 1966	Erhard (II)
7	Lauritz Lauritzen (1910–1980)	SPD	1 Dezember 1966	15 December 1972	Kiesinger; Brandt (I)
Federal Minister for Regional Planning, Building and Urban Development
8	Hans-Jochen Vogel (1926–2020)	SPD	15 December 1972	16 May 1974	Brandt (II)
9	Karl Ravens (1927–2017)	SPD	16 May 1974	16 February 1978	Schmidt (I • II)
10	Dieter Haack (born 1934)	SPD	16 February 1978	1 October 1982	Schmidt (II • III)
11	Oscar Schneider (1927–2024)	CSU	1 October 1982	21 April 1989	Kohl (I • II • III)
12	Gerda Hasselfeldt (born 1950)	CSU	21 April 1989	18 January 1991	Kohl (III)
13	Irmgard Schwaetzer (born 1942)	FDP	18 January 1991	17 November 1994	Kohl (IV)
14	Klaus Töpfer (1938–2024)	CDU	17 November 1994	14 January 1998	Kohl (V)
15	Eduard Oswald (born 1947)	CSU	14 January 1998	26 October 1998	Kohl (V)
The Federal Ministry was dissolved from 26 October 1998 to 8 December 2021.
Federal Minister for Housing, Urban Development and Building
16	Klara Geywitz (born 1976)	SPD	8 December 2021	2025	Scholz (I)
17	Verena Hubertz	SPD	6 May 2025	Incumbent	Merz (I)
