= Richard Freudenberg =

Richard Freudenberg may refer to:

- Richard Freudenberg (basketball)
- Richard Freudenberg (politician)
