= Hermann Lindrath =

German politician

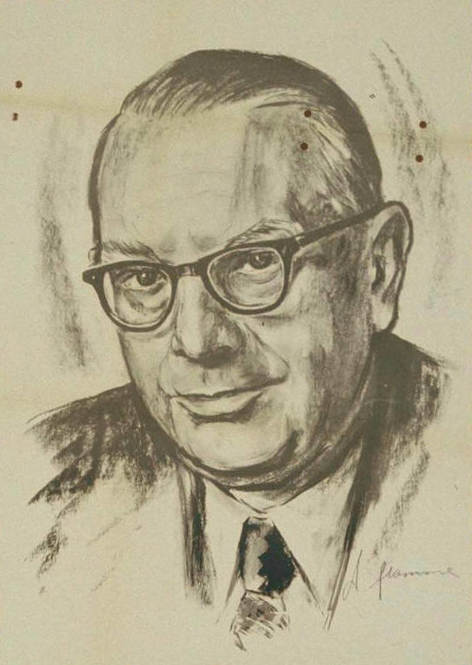

Minister for Federal Patrimony
- In office 29 October 1957 – 27 February 1960
- Chancellor: Konrad Adenauer
- Preceded by: Franz Blücher (as Minister for Economic Cooperation)
- Succeeded by: Hans Wilhelmi

Member of the Bundestag; for Mannheim-Land
- In office 6 October 1953 – 27 February 1960
- Preceded by: Richard Freudenberg
- Succeeded by: Helmut Artzinger

Personal details
- Born: 29 June 1896 Eisleben, Germany
- Died: 27 February 1960 (aged 63) Mannheim, West Germany
- Party: Christian Democratic Union

Hermann Lindrath (29 June 1896 – 27 February 1960) was a German politician (CDU). From 1957 to 1960 he was Federal Minister of Public Holdings (Federal Patrimony) (Bundesminister für wirtschaftlichen Besitz des Bundes), one of the few federal ministers who died in office.

== Career ==
In 1914 Lindrath volunteered to serve in World War I. After the war he studied law and economics, completed his Ph.D. (Dr. rer. pol.) on "Enterprise models in the mining industry", worked in a bank, with the municipal administration and as a chartered accountant in Halle, Saxony-Anhalt, before he joined the management of HeidelbergCement.

In 1953 Lindrath defeated industrialist Richard Freudenberg (of Freudenberg Group) who had held the constituency of Mannheim-Land in his first bid for a Bundestag seat. In 1957 he was reelected to represent his constituency for a second term. The same year he was appointed to serve as Minister in chancellor Adenauer's government. Lindrath's appointment helped to achieve a balance between Catholics and Protestants among the cabinet members. Some say that exactly for this religious consideration Lindrath was given preference over Kurt-Georg Kiesinger from the same region.

Lindrath's major contribution to German politics was his effort to sell off companies held by the German state, the Federal Republic of Germany, to the general public in a program of "popular capitalism" (called Volksaktien in German), which was initiated by Ludwig Erhard. Lindrath successfully sold the majority stake in Preussag, a diversified company with holdings in mining and transportation, and he concluded a deal with the state of Lower Saxony that paved the way for the privatization of Volkswagen, the VW car manufacturer, which was implemented after his successor, Hans Wilhelmi, had taken over responsibility.

== Bibliography ==
- Udo Kempf and Hans-Georg Merz (eds.), Kanzler und Minister 1949-1998. Biografisches Lexikon der deutschen Bundesregierungen, Wiesbaden: Westdeutscher Verlag, 2001, pp. 443–447.
- Rudolf Vierhaus and Ludolf Herbst (eds.), Biographisches Handbuch der Mitglieder des Deutschen Bundestages 1949-2002. Band I, A-M, Munich: Saur, 2002, pp. 505–506.
