= Helmut Artzinger =

German politician (1912–1996)

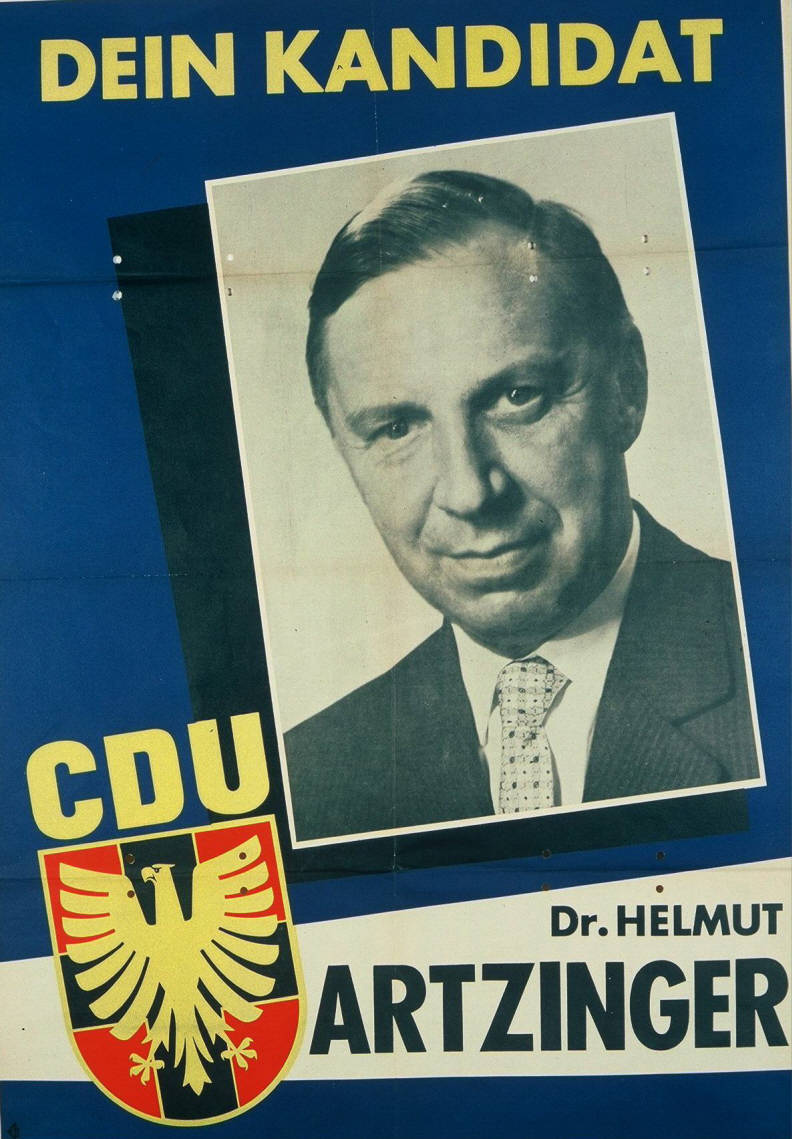
- Election poster of the CDU (1961)

Member of the Bundestag
- In office 17 October 1961 – 14 December 1976
- Preceded by: Hermann Lindrath
- Succeeded by: Klaus Bühler
- Constituency: Mannheim-Land (1961–1965); Bruchsal – Karlsruhe-Land II (1965–1976)

Personal details
- Born: 22 April 1912 Bergisch Gladbach, Germany
- Died: 22 October 1996 (aged 84) Bruchsal, Germany
- Party: Christian Democratic Union

Helmut Artzinger (22 April 1912 – 22 October 1996) was a German politician of the Christian Democratic Union (CDU) and former member of the German Bundestag.

== Life ==
Artzinger was a member of the CDU since 1948. In 1953 he became a council member of the city of Weinheim and in 1959 a member of the district council. He was a member of the German Bundestag from 1961 to 1976. There he first represented the constituency of Mannheim-Land and from 1965 the constituency of Bruchsal-Karlsruhe-Land II. From 1965 to 1977 he was also a member of the European Parliament.

== Literature ==
Herbst, Ludolf; Jahn, Bruno (2002). Vierhaus, Rudolf (ed.). Biographisches Handbuch der Mitglieder des Deutschen Bundestages. 1949–2002 [Biographical Handbook of the Members of the German Bundestag. 1949–2002] (in German). München: De Gruyter - De Gruyter Saur. p. 1715. ISBN 978-3-11-184511-1.
