= 1953 West German federal election =

- 6 September 1953

All 487 seats in the Bundestag (Note: As well as the 22 non-voting delegates for West Berlin, elected by the West Berlin Legislature.) 244 seats needed for a majority
- Registered: 33,120,940 (▲6.1%)
- Turnout: 86.0% (▲7.5pp)

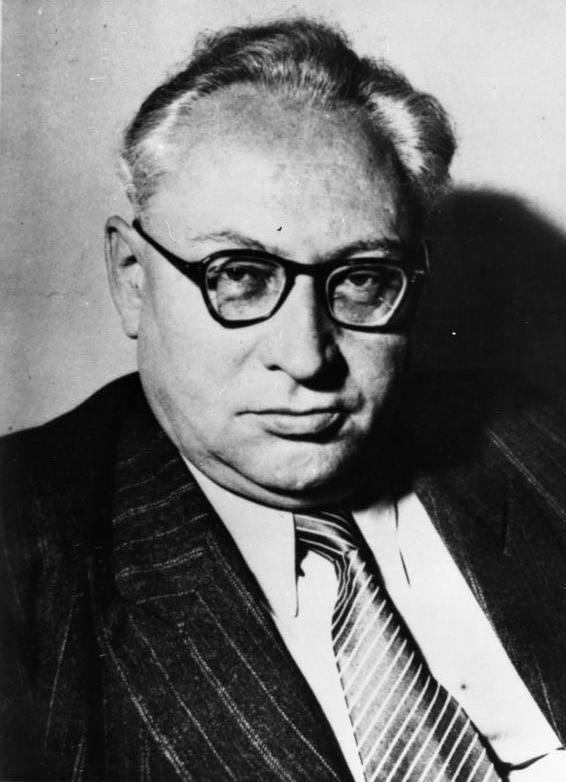

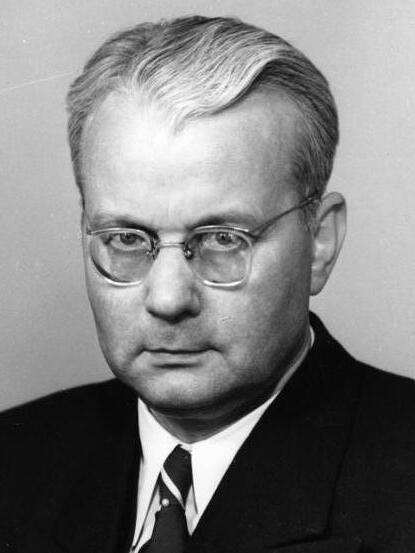

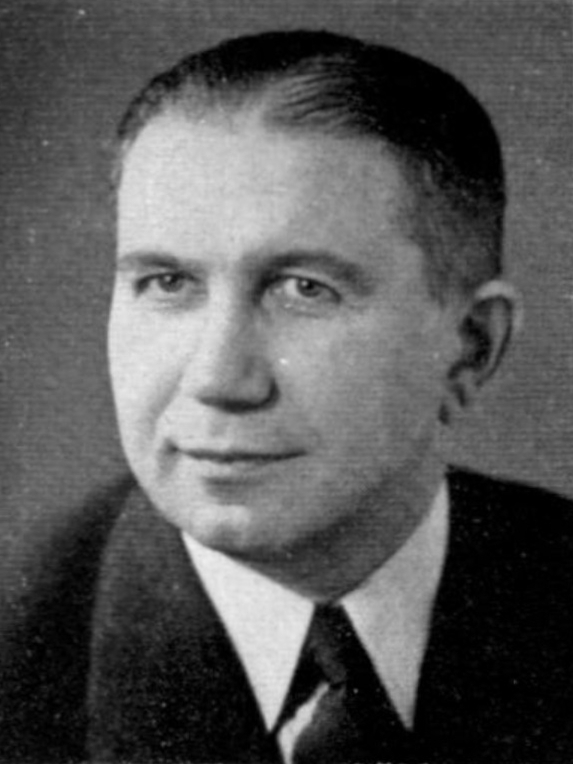

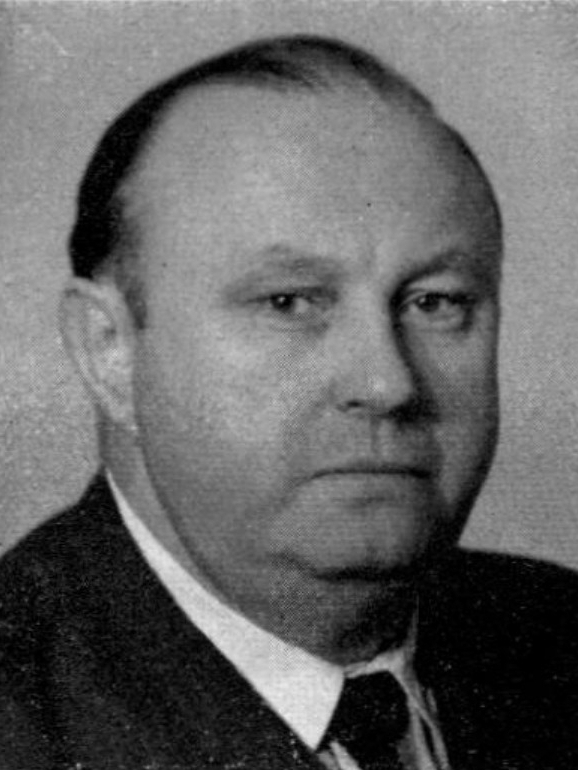

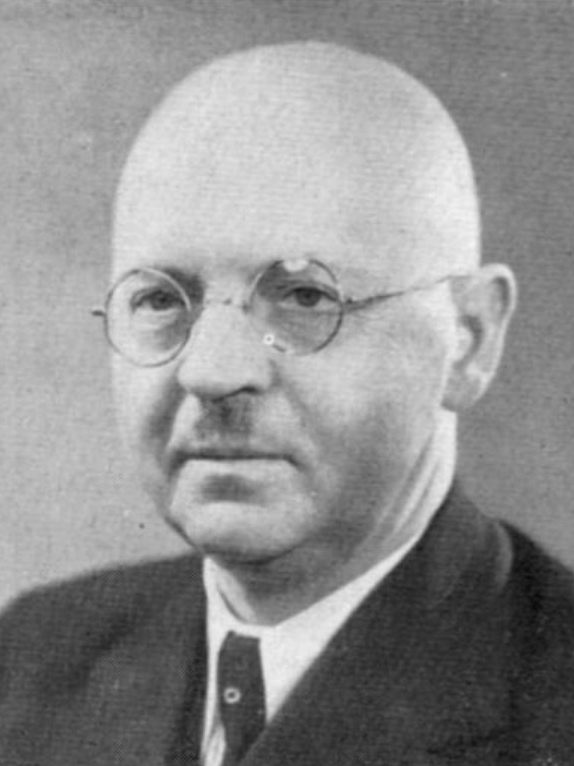
	First party	Second party	Third party
Candidate	Konrad Adenauer	Erich Ollenhauer	Franz Blücher
Party	CDU/CSU	SPD	FDP
Last election	31.0%, 139 seats	29.2%, 131 seats	11.9%, 52 seats
Seats won	243 (Note: As well as 6 non-voting delegates for West Berlin.)	151 (Note: As well as 11 non-voting delegates for West Berlin.)	48 (Note: As well as 5 non-voting delegates for West Berlin.)
Seat change	▲104	▲20	▼4
Popular vote	12,443,981	7,944,943	2,629,163
Percentage	45.2%	28.8%	9.5%
Swing	▲14.2 pp	▼0.4 pp	▼2.4 pp
	Fourth party	Fifth party	Sixth party
Candidate	Waldemar Kraft	Heinrich Hellwege	Johannes Brockmann
Party	GB/BHE	DP	Centre
Last election	Did not exist	4.0%, 17 seats	3.1%, 10 seats
Seats won	27	15	3
Seat change	New party	▼2	▼7
Popular vote	1,616,953	896,128	217,078
Percentage	5.9%	3.3%	0.8%
Swing	New party	▼0.7 pp	▼2.3 pp
Government before election
First Adenauer cabinet
CDU/CSU–FDP–DP
Government after election
Second Adenauer cabinet
CDU/CSU–FDP–GB/BHE–DP

A federal election was held in West Germany on 6 September 1953 to elect the members of the second Bundestag. The Christian Democratic Union (CDU) emerged as the largest party.

This was the last election before Saarland joined West Germany in 1957. It had been a separate entity, Saar protectorate, under French control since 1946.

The CDU/CSU formed a center-right coalition government with the FDP, DP and GB/BHE, leaving the SPD as the main opposition. In comparison to the 1949 election where ten parties won seats, only six parties won seats in the 1953 election, thus entailing a consolidation of the party system.

== Campaign ==
Federal Chancellor Konrad Adenauer (who was also CDU leader) campaigned on his policies of economic reconstruction and growth, moderate conservatism or Christian democracy, and close relations with the United States. During the campaign he attacked the Social Democratic Party (SPD) ferociously. His staff had a comfortable coach on a train previously used only by Hermann Göring and behind that a dining car with sleeping berths for journalists. The new SPD leader (Kurt Schumacher had died in 1952) was Erich Ollenhauer, who was more moderate in his policies than Schumacher had been. He did not oppose, in principle, the United States' military presence in Western Europe. He later – in 1957 – supported a military alliance of most European countries, including Germany. On 3 September American Secretary of State John Foster Dulles said that "A defeat for Adenauer would have catastrophic consequences for the prospects for German reunification and the restoration of sovereignty" and that it would "trigger off such confusion in Germany that further delays in German efforts for reunification and freedom would be unavoidable." Adenauer managed to convince clearly more West German voters of his leadership abilities and economic and political success to easily win a second term, although he had to form a coalition government with the Free Democratic Party and the conservative German Party to gain a majority in the Bundestag.

== Opinion polls ==
Polling firm	Fieldwork date	Sample size	Union	SPD	FDP	GB/BHE	DP	Others	Lead
1953 federal election	6 Sep 1953	–	45.2	28.8	9.5	5.9	3.3	7.3	16.4
HICOG	22 Aug–3 Sep 1953	664	50.3	29.5	11.0	4.3		4.9	20.8
UNESCO	4 Jul–30 Aug 1953	1,694	44.4	30.6	18.1			6.9	13.8
Emnid	20–28 Aug 1953	2,000	40.7	25.9	25.9			7.4	14.8
Emnid	11–16 Aug 1953	2,000	38.2	29.0	25.0			7.9	9.2
HICOG	Aug 1953	N/A	46	34	9	10			12
Emnid	3–10 Jul 1953	2,000	41.8	25.3	27.9			5.1	16.5
HICOG	Jul 1953	N/A	41	38	6	15			3
HICOG	Jun 1953	N/A	45	35	7	12			10
HICOG	Apr 1953	N/A	46	36	7	11			10
HICOG	Jan 1953	N/A	39	40	10	10			1
HICOG	Dec 1952	N/A	37	38	10	15			1
HICOG	Aug 1952	N/A	38	39	9	14			1
HICOG	Jul 1952	N/A	34	40	14	12			6
HICOG	Jun 1952	N/A	35	41	11	13			6
HICOG	May 1952	N/A	35	41	12	12			6
HICOG	Apr 1952	N/A	35	43	12	10			8
HICOG	Feb 1952	N/A	34	41	11	14			7
HICOG	Jan 1952	N/A	35	43	11	11			8
HICOG	Oct 1951	N/A	32	42	11	15			10
HICOG	Sep 1951	N/A	34	42	10	14			8
HICOG	Aug 1951	N/A	31	45	10	14			14
HICOG	Jul 1951	N/A	36	41	10	13			5
HICOG	Apr 1951	N/A	35	38	11	17			3
HICOG	Mar 1951	N/A	31	42	10	17			11
1949 federal election	14 Aug 1949	–	31.0	29.2	11.9	—	4.0	23.9	1.8

== Results ==
Party	Party-list			Constituency			Seats			
Party	Votes	%	Seats	Votes	%	Seats	Elected	West Berlin	Total	+/–
Christian Democratic Union	10,016,594	36.36	61	9,577,659	34.80	130	191	6	197	+80
Social Democratic Party	7,944,943	28.84	106	8,131,257	29.55	45	151	11	162	+26
Free Democratic Party	2,629,163	9.54	34	2,967,566	10.78	14	48	5	53	0
Christian Social Union	2,427,387	8.81	10	2,450,286	8.90	42	52	0	52	+28
All-German Bloc/League of Expellees and Deprived of Rights	1,616,953	5.87	27	1,613,215	5.86	0	27	0	27	New
German Party	896,128	3.25	5	1,073,031	3.90	10	15	0	15	−2
Communist Party	607,860	2.21	0	611,317	2.22	0	0	0	0	−15
Bavaria Party	465,641	1.69	0	399,070	1.45	0	0	0	0	−17
All-German People's Party	318,475	1.16	0	286,465	1.04	0	0	0	0	New
Deutsche Reichspartei	295,739	1.07	0	204,725	0.74	0	0	0	0	−5
Centre Party	217,078	0.79	2	55,835	0.20	1	3	0	3	−7
Dachverband der Nationalen Sammlung	70,726	0.26	0	78,356	0.28	0	0	0	0	New
South Schleswig Voters' Association	44,585	0.16	0	44,339	0.16	0	0	0	0	−1
Schleswig-Holstein Farmers and Farmworkers Democracy				6,269	0.02	0	0	0	0	New
Patriotic Union				2,531	0.01	0	0	0	0	New
Party of the Good Germans				654	0.00	0	0	0	0	New
Independents and voter groups				17,185	0.06	0	0	0	0	−3
Total	27,551,272	100.00	245	27,519,760	100.00	242	487	22	509	+99
Valid votes	27,551,272	96.74		27,519,760	96.63					
Invalid/blank votes	928,278	3.26		959,790	3.37					
Total votes	28,479,550	100.00		28,479,550	100.00					
Registered voters/turnout	33,120,940	85.99		33,120,940	85.99					
Source: Bundeswahlleiter

=== Results by state ===
==== Constituency seats ====
State	Total seats	Seats won					
State	Total seats	CDU	SPD	CSU	FDP	DP	DZP
Baden-Württemberg	33	29	2		2		
Bavaria	47		3	42	2		
Bremen	3		3				
Hamburg	8	3	1		2	2	
Hesse	22	7	10		5		
Lower Saxony	34	13	11		2	8	
North Rhine-Westphalia	66	51	13		1		1
Rhineland-Palatinate	15	13	2				
Schleswig-Holstein	14	14					
Total	242	130	59	42	14	10	1

==== List seats ====
State	Total seats	Seats won						
State	Total seats	SPD	CDU	FDP	GB/ BHE	CSU	DP	DZP
Baden-Württemberg	34	14	9	7	3		1	
Bavaria	44	22		4	8	10		
Bremen	3		2				1	
Hamburg	10	6	4					
Hesse	22	6	8	4	3		1	
Lower Saxony	32	10	12	3	7			
North Rhine-Westphalia	72	34	21	11	3		1	2
Rhineland-Palatinate	16	7	5	4				
Schleswig-Holstein	12	7		1	3		1	
Total	245	106	61	34	27	10	5	2

== Aftermath ==
Konrad Adenauer remained Chancellor, governing in a broad coalition (two-thirds majority) with most of the minor parties except for the SPD and Centre Party.
