= Hans-Christoph Seebohm =

German politician (1903–1967)

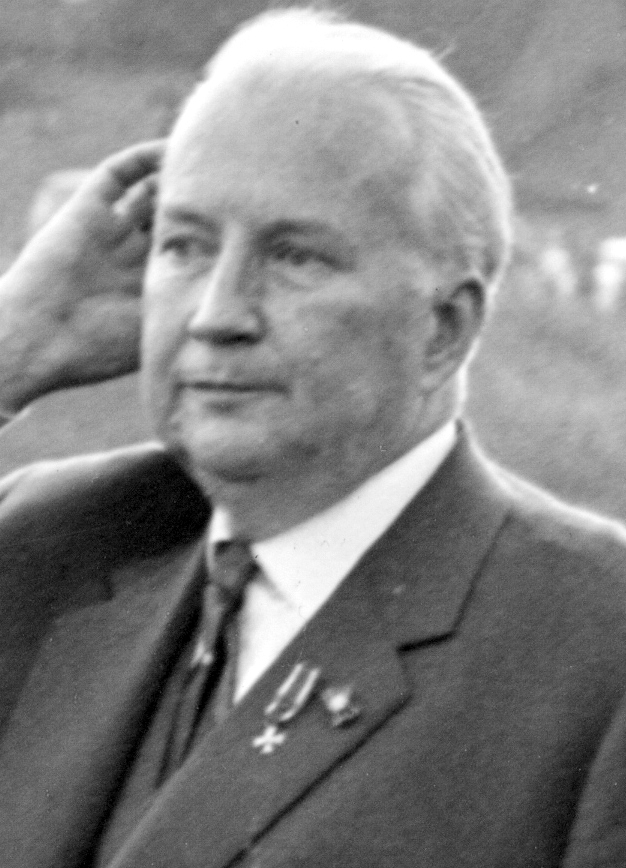
- Seebohm in 1964

Vice Chancellor of Germany West Germany
- In office 8 November – 1 December 1966
- Chancellor: Ludwig Erhard
- Preceded by: Erich Mende
- Succeeded by: Willy Brandt

Federal Minister of Transport
- In office 20 September 1949 – 30 November 1966
- Chancellor: Konrad Adenauer (1949–1963); Ludwig Erhard (1963–1966)
- Preceded by: Office established
- Succeeded by: Georg Leber

Member of the Bundestag
- In office 7 September 1949 – 17 September 1967

Personal details
- Born: Hans-Christoph Seebohm; 4 August 1903 Emanuelssegen, Province of Silesia, Kingdom of Prussia, German Empire
- Died: 17 September 1967 (aged 64) Bonn, West Germany
- Party: NLP (1945–1957); DP (1947–1960); CDU (from 1960)
- Children: 2, including Thomas Seebohm
- Education: Technische Hochschule Charlottenburg
- Occupation: Mining director, industrial manager, politician

Hans-Christoph Seebohm (4 August 1903 – 17 September 1967) was a German politician of the national conservative German Party (Deutsche Partei, DP) and after 1960 the Christian Democratic Union (CDU). He was the minister of Transport for 17 years and the vice chancellor of West Germany in 1966.

== Biography ==
Seebohm attended school in Dresden, Saxony and studied mining at the Ludwig-Maximilians-Universität München and the Technische Hochschule Charlottenburg in Berlin. Passing the Staatsexamen in 1928, he worked as a junior civil servant in Halle and obtained a doctorate level degree from Technische Hochschule Charlottenburg. He became a mining director at Silesian Gleiwitz and Bytom and upon the German occupation of Czechoslovakia in 1938/39 supervised the "Aryanization" of the mines at Královské Poříčí (Königswerth).

After World War II, he joined the regionalist Lower Saxon State Party in the British occupation zone under Heinrich Hellwege, which in 1947 was renamed German Party (DP). Seebohm became president of the chamber of commerce at Braunschweig and was a member of the Landtag state assembly of Lower Saxony from 1946 until 1951. From 1946 until 1948 he held the office of Minister for Reconstruction, Labour and Health in Hinrich Wilhelm Kopf's Lower Saxon state government. In the run-up to the first federal election of 1949, he and his party fellows Hellwege and von Merkatz negotiated a national conservative alliance with the Deutsche Rechtspartei and Hessian National Democrats, which however were aborted by the British occupation forces. In 1952, Seebohm was elected DP chairman, but refused to assume office.

=== Minister for Transport ===
From 1949 until his death he was a member of the Bundestag for the constituency of Hamburg-Harburg. From 20 September 1949 until 30 November 1966 he also served as Federal Minister for Transport, firstly under Chancellor Konrad Adenauer, who forced him to join the CDU in 1960 as he wouldn't support the DP any longer; then under Ludwig Erhard, under whom he ultimately, but briefly, served as Vice Chancellor. Seebohm was a firm supporter of the Bundesbahn, and went to some length to hamstring the trucking industry. In April 1953, second trailers were prohibited. In 1954 a law was passed dictating that half of all transports in Germany had to be carried by train; this would be promoted by subventioning rates for train transports. Trucking remained popular, however, due to its higher flexibility. Thus, in 1956, the rules were tightened yet more: Sunday truck traffic was prohibited, along with a host of other new restrictions. Trucks were restricted to a 24-tonne (53,000 lb) GVW, with a maximum axle load of 8 tonnes (18,000 lb), and a maximum overall length of 14 metres (46 ft). A minimum power-to-weight requirement of 6 PS/tonne (max 373 lb/hp) was instituted. These various restrictions forced truck manufacturers to develop entirely new trucks meeting the ever tightening requirements, and had a detrimental effect on exports. In 1960 an easing of the restrictions was announced; railroad and trucking transport were now working in conjunction. Paradoxically, meeting the tough restrictions had forced the German trucking industry to become lean and innovative, leaving them in a much stronger position than before Seebohm's programs.

When the 1966 grand coalition under Chancellor Kurt Georg Kiesinger took office, he left the cabinet, having served as a federal minister for seventeen years, a record beaten only by Foreign Minister Hans-Dietrich Genscher's 23 years (with an interruption in 1982) but as of 2011 still the record for uninterrupted service.

=== Spokesperson for the Sudeten Germans ===
From 1959 Seebohm acted as spokesperson of the Sudetendeutsche Landsmannschaft (Sudeten German Homeland Association) of German expellees from Czechoslovakia, where he held his so-called "weekend speeches". In line with West German government policy at the time, he questioned the borders of Germany, referring to the borders of the 1937 German Reich as base of any border revision and stating that Germans should also never forget about the eastern territories lost after World War I according to the resolutions of the Treaty of Versailles, while at the same time demanding restoration of the 1938 Munich Agreement, advocating the “return of the stolen Sudeten German homeland to the Sudeten German people.”

Seebohm's irredentist leanings about the Sudetenland were a source of embarrassment for the Bonn government, which had to counter West Germany didn't have any claim on these regions and causing him to be chided by Erhard. Adenauer had hoped he would have so much work to do he wouldn't have time for radical activities. Der Spiegel described him as someone who “with never tiring energy defies Cabinet decision whenever a demagogic opportunity presents itself.”

=== End of political career ===
Seebohm died a few months after his retirement and is buried in the Bad Pyrmont cemetery.
