= 1957 West German federal election =

- 15 September 1957

All 497 seats in the Bundestag (Note: As well as the 22 non-voting delegates for West Berlin, elected by the West Berlin Legislature.) 249 seats needed for a majority
- Registered: 35,400,923 (▲6.9%)
- Turnout: 87.8% (▲1.8pp)
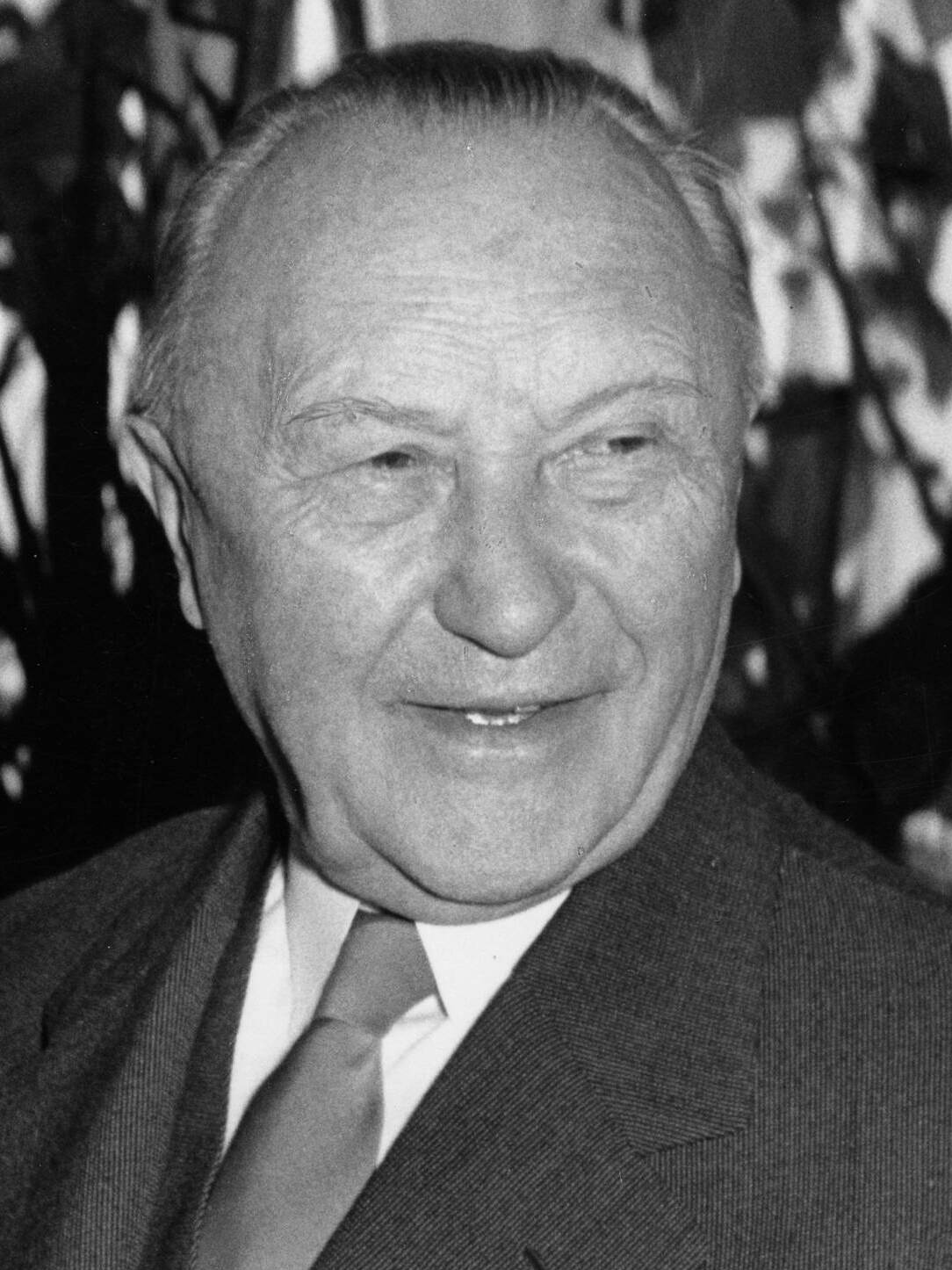

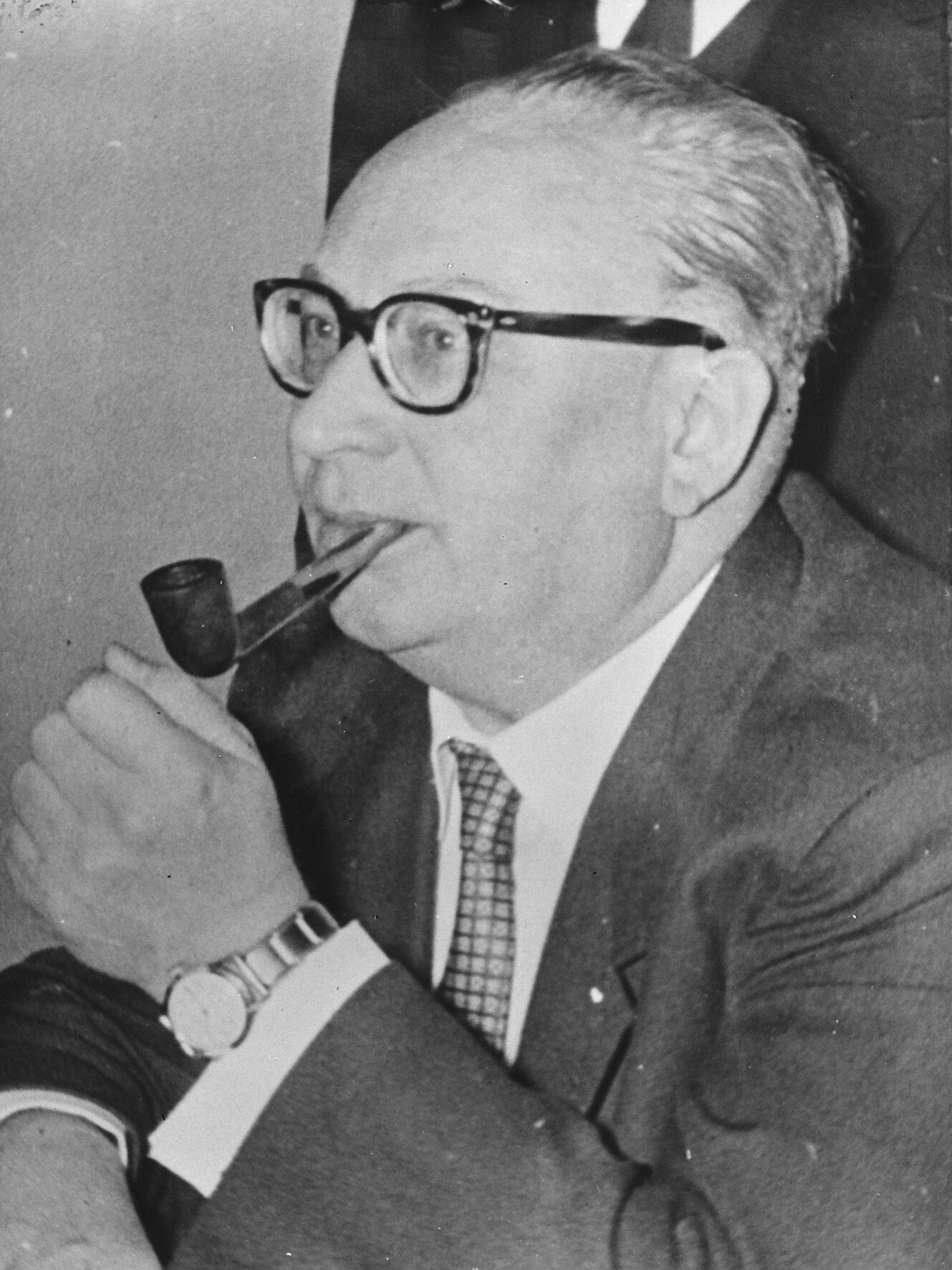

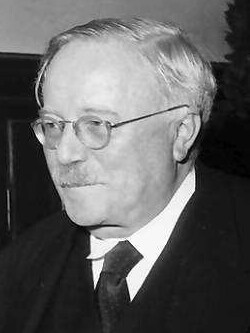

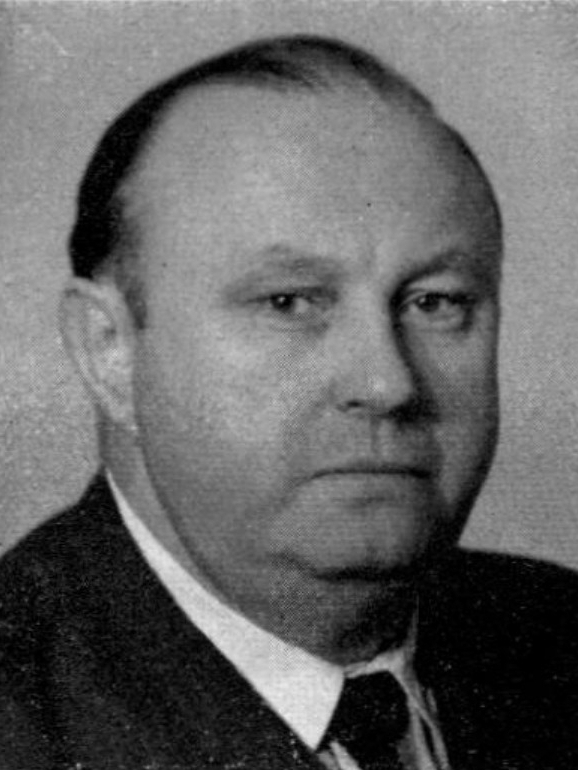
	First party	Second party
Candidate	Konrad Adenauer	Erich Ollenhauer
Party	CDU/CSU	SPD
Last election	45.2%, 243 seats	28.8%, 151 seats
Seats won	270 (Note: As well as 7 non-voting delegates for West Berlin.)	169 (Note: As well as 12 non-voting delegates for West Berlin.)
Seat change	▲27	▲18
Popular vote	15,008,399	9,495,571
Percentage	50.2%	31.8%
Swing	▲5.0 pp	▲3.0 pp
	Third party	Fourth party
Candidate	Reinhold Maier	Heinrich Hellwege
Party	FDP	DP
Last election	9.5%, 48 seats	3.3%, 15 seats
Seats won	41 (Note: As well as 3 non-voting delegates for West Berlin.)	17
Seat change	▼7	▲2
Popular vote	2,307,135	1,007,282
Percentage	7.7%	3.4%
Swing	▼1.8 pp	▲0.1 pp
- The left side shows constituency winners of the election by their party colours. The right side shows party list winners of the election for the additional members by their party colours.
Government before election
Second Adenauer cabinet
CDU/CSU–FDP–DP
Government after election
Third Adenauer cabinet
CDU/CSU–DP

A federal election was held in West Germany on 15 September 1957 to elect the members of the third Bundestag. The Christian Democratic Union and its longtime ally, the Christian Social Union in Bavaria, won a sweeping victory, taking 270 seats in the Bundestag to win the first–and, to date, only–absolute majority for a single German parliamentary group in a free election.

This was the first West German federal election to take place in the Saarland, which–as Saar protectorate–had been a separate entity under French control between 1946 and 1956.

Only four parties won seats in the 1957 election, which was a consolidation of the party system relative to the 1953 and 1949 elections where six and ten parties won seats respectively. As the CDU/CSU won a majority of seats, it formed a government without coalition partners.

== Campaign ==
=== Economy ===
Federal Chancellor Konrad Adenauer had some solid advantages over his Social Democratic Party (SPD) opponent, Erich Ollenhauer; West Germany had become fully sovereign in 1955 and The Law on Pension Reform (backdated to 1 January 1957) was enormously popular when passed in the spring of 1957, while the economy had been growing on average 7% per year since 1953 in part due to young, skilled and highly educated workers immigrating from East Germany keeping productivity high and earnings growth low. West Germany had joined the European Economic Community in March 1957. Its economy was growing steadily with very low unemployment, and most West Germans felt more prosperous and more secure than in 1949 or 1953.

=== Defence ===
Although Adenauer had said that he would confine the Bundeswehr to conventional weapons, on 5 April he said "Tactical atomic weapons are nothing but the further development of artillery... it goes without saying that... we cannot dispense with having them for our troops... we must follow suit and have these new types – they are, after all, practically normal weapons." On 12 April eighteen physicists from the Max Planck Institute released the Göttingen Manifesto calling on West Germany to not produce, test or use nuclear weapons. Adenauer at first tried to brush the matter aside, but under heavy criticism from the press decided instead to meet with five of the physicists in Bonn. After a seven-hour meeting a joint communique was issued saying "The Federal Republic will not produce its own nuclear weapons, and consequently the Federal Government has no reason to approach German nuclear scientists about their participation in the development of nuclear weapons." The row continued, having been fuelled by an aggressive note from the Soviet Union in April and ended at the NATO Spring conference in May. Ultimately the row was too far away from the election itself to damage a surprisingly healthy looking Adenauer's prospects.

== Results ==
The All-German Bloc lost all of their seats, but the ideologically similar German Party maintained theirs. The 1957 election was the last time that a right-wing populist party would return members to the Bundestag until Alternative for Germany's entrance in 2017. The election also marked the last time until 1990 that any party other than CDU/CSU or SPD won any constituency seats.

Party	Party-list			Constituency			Seats			
Party	Votes	%	Seats	Votes	%	Seats	Elected	West Berlin	Total	+/–
Christian Democratic Union	11,875,339	39.71	68	11,975,400	39.71	147	215	7	222	+25
Social Democratic Party	9,495,571	31.75	123	9,651,669	32.01	46	169	12	181	+19
Christian Social Union	3,133,060	10.48	8	3,186,150	10.57	47	55	0	55	+2
Free Democratic Party	2,307,135	7.71	40	2,276,234	7.55	1	41	2	43	–10
All-German Bloc/League of Expellees and Deprived of Rights	1,374,066	4.59	0	1,324,636	4.39	0	0	0	0	–27
German Party	1,007,282	3.37	11	1,062,293	3.52	6	17	0	17	+2
Deutsche Reichspartei	308,564	1.03	0	290,622	0.96	0	0	0	0	0
Federalist Union	254,322	0.85	0	295,533	0.98	0	0	0	0	New
Bund der Deutschen	58,725	0.20	0	37,329	0.12	0	0	0	0	New
German Middle Class	36,592	0.12	0	3,024	0.01	0	0	0	0	New
South Schleswig Voters' Association	32,262	0.11	0	33,463	0.11	0	0	0	0	0
German Community	17,490	0.06	0	16,410	0.05	0	0	0	0	New
Patriotic Union	5,020	0.02	0	2,250	0.01	0	0	0	0	0
Party of the Good Germans				356	0.00	0	0	0	0	0
Free German People's Party							0	1	1	New
Independents and voter groups				845	0.00	0	0	0	0	0
Total	29,905,428	100.00	250	30,156,214	100.00	247	497	22	519	+10
Valid votes	29,905,428	96.24		30,156,214	97.05					
Invalid/blank votes	1,167,466	3.76		916,680	2.95					
Total votes	31,072,894	100.00		31,072,894	100.00					
Registered voters/turnout	35,400,923	87.77		35,400,923	87.77					
Source: Bundeswahlleiter

=== Results by state ===
==== Constituency seats ====
State	Total seats	Seats won				
State	Total seats	CDU	CSU	SPD	DP	FDP
Baden-Württemberg	33	32		1		
Bavaria	47		47			
Bremen	3			3		
Hamburg	8	1		7		
Hesse	22	11		10	1	
Lower Saxony	34	21		8	5	
North Rhine-Westphalia	66	53		13		
Rhineland-Palatinate	15	12		3		
Saarland	5	3		1		1
Schleswig-Holstein	14	14				
Total	247	147	47	46	6	1

==== List seats ====
State	Total seats	Seats won				
State	Total seats	SPD	CDU	FDP	DP	CSU
Baden-Württemberg	34	17	5	11	1	
Bavaria	35	25		4		6
Bremen	3		2		1	
Hamburg	11	2	6	2	1	
Hesse	24	9	9	4	2	
Lower Saxony	27	14	6	4	3	
North Rhine-Westphalia	88	41	34	11	2	
Rhineland-Palatinate	16	7	6	3		
Saarland	3	1				2
Schleswig-Holstein	9	7		1	1	
Total	250	123	68	40	11	8

== Aftermath ==
Konrad Adenauer led the CDU-CSU coalition to a landslide victory. The CDU-CSU won an outright majority— the only to date. Since the CDU and the CSU form a single bloc in the Bundestag, this is the only time that a political party in Germany has been elected to a majority government in a free election.
