= Anton Storch =

German politician (1892–1975)

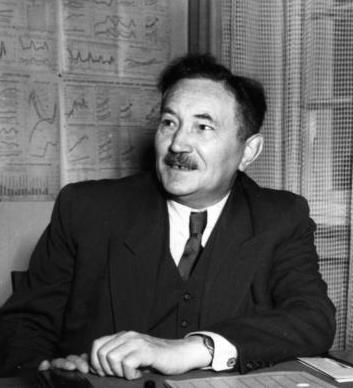
- Storch in 1952

Minister for Labour
- In office 20 September 1949 – 29 October 1957
- Chancellor: Konrad Adenauer
- Preceded by: Office established
- Succeeded by: Theodor Blank

Member of the Bundestag; for Osnabrück-Stadt und -Land
- In office 7 September 1949 – 19 October 1965
- Preceded by: Constituency established
- Succeeded by: Ferdinand Erpenbeck

Personal details
- Born: Anton Valentin Storch; 1 April 1892 Fulda, Germany
- Died: 26 November 1975 (aged 83) Fulda, West Germany
- Party: Christian Democratic Union (after 1945)
- Other political affiliations: Centre Party (1919–1933)

Anton Storch (1 April 1892 – 26 November 1975) was a German trade unionist, politician, a member of the Christian Democratic Union and the Minister for Labour from 1949 to 1957.

== Early life ==
Storch was born in Fulda, Hesse, in 1892. He was trained as a carpenter and served in World War I.

== Career ==
Storch was the functionary of Woodworker's Christian Trade Union from 1920 to 1933, trade union chairman of Hanover region from 1931 to 1933 and insurance agent until 1939. From 1939 to 1945 he served as a member of air raid police. He contributed to the reestablishment of the trade unions in Hanover (British Zone) in 1945 and 1946. From 1946 to 1948, he served as the chief of department for social policy of British Zone trade unions. He became a member of Bizonal Economic Council in 1947 and was named its director of labor in 1948. He was the director of the workers' union (Verwaltung für Arbeit (VfA)) until 1949.

He was a member of the Christian Democratic Union (CDU) and one of the CDU representatives in the Bundestag. He became a member of the Bundestag in 1949 and served there until 1965. In the party he served at the social affairs committee. Then he was appointed minister of labor and social affairs to the cabinet led by Prime Minister Konrad Adenauer on 20 September 1949. He was in office until 29 October 1957 when Theodor Blank replaced him in the post.

== Political positions ==
Storch was an advocate of "far-reaching social welfare programme" and of Catholic political economy. He argued that the reason for two world wars was the "exaggerated liberal-capitalistic economic order of the last one hundred years."
