= Richard Freudenberg (politician) =

German politician (1892–1975)

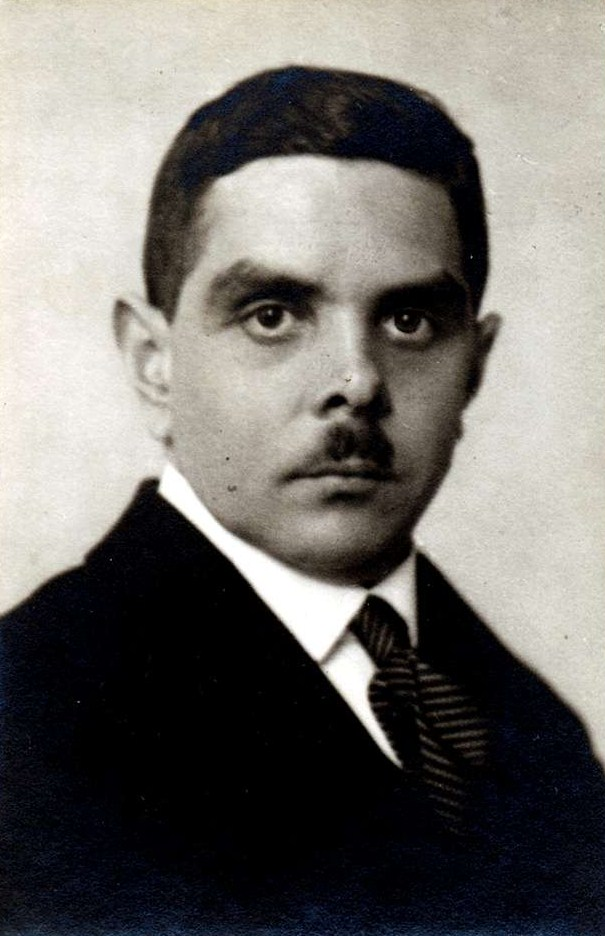
- Freudenberg in 1919

Member of the Bundestag; for Mannheim-Land
- In office 7 September 1949 – 6 October 1953
- Preceded by: Constituency established
- Succeeded by: Hermann Lindrath

Member of the; Landtag of the Republic of Baden
- In office 1919–1925

Personal details
- Born: 9 February 1892 Weinheim, Germany
- Died: 21 November 1975 (aged 83) Reutte, Austria
- Party: Free Democratic Party
- Other political affiliations: DDP (1918–1930); DStP (1930–1933)
- Education: University of Bonn; University of Reading; Technische Universität Berlin

Richard Freudenberg (9 February 1892 – 21 November 1975) was a German politician of the Free Democratic Party (FDP) and former member of the German Bundestag.

== Life ==
Freudenberg won the election in the Mannheim-Land constituency as a direct candidate with 43.69% of the vote, ahead of the CDU candidate (25.54%); the DVP had not put forward a candidate of its own. This made him, together with Eduard Edert (Flensburg constituency) and Franz Ott (Esslingen constituency), one of the independent representatives in the 1st German Bundestag. As an intern, Freudenberg joined the FDP faction and worked for them in the committees for foreign trade issues and internal reorganization.

== Literature ==
Herbst, Ludolf; Jahn, Bruno (2002). Vierhaus, Rudolf (ed.). Biographisches Handbuch der Mitglieder des Deutschen Bundestages. 1949–2002 [Biographical Handbook of the Members of the German Bundestag. 1949–2002] (in German). München: De Gruyter - De Gruyter Saur. p. 1715. ISBN 978-3-11-184511-1.
