= Federal Ministry of Matters of the Marshall Plan =

Former West German ministry

The Federal Ministry of Marshall Plan Affairs, founded in 1949, was a ministry of the Federal Republic of Germany charged with overseeing the rebuilding of the new republic using money and aid given by the United States as part of the European Recovery Program (also called Marshall Plan).

The Ministry was renamed Ministry for Economic Cooperation in 1953. In 1957 it was transformed into the Minister for Federal Patrimony, which existed until 1969.

== List of Federal Ministers ==
The first and only Minister was Franz Blücher (FDP and later FVP), who also was Vice Chancellor

Political Party: FDP/FVP

Name (Born-Died)	Portrait	Party	Term of Office		Chancellor (Cabinet)
Franz Blücher (1896–1959); Vice-Chancellor		FDP (until 1956); FVP (from 1956)	Federal Minister for Matters of the Marshall Plan		
Franz Blücher (1896–1959); Vice-Chancellor		FDP (until 1956); FVP (from 1956)	20 September 1949	20 October 1953	Adenauer (I)
Franz Blücher (1896–1959); Vice-Chancellor		FDP (until 1956); FVP (from 1956)	Federal Minister for Economic Cooperation		
Franz Blücher (1896–1959); Vice-Chancellor		FDP (until 1956); FVP (from 1956)	20 October 1953	29 October 1957	Adenauer (II)
