= Lower Saxony State Party =

Lower Saxon State Party Niedersächsische Landespartei
- Leader: Heinrich Hellwege
- Founder: Heinrich Hellwege
- Founded: 1945
- Dissolved: 1947
- Preceded by: German-Hanoverian Party
- Succeeded by: German Party
- Headquarters: Hanover
- Ideology: Conservativism; Regionalism; German nationalism
- Political position: Right-wing

The Lower Saxony State Party (Niedersächsische Landespartei, NLP) was a short lived regionalist political party in Germany.

It was founded in 1945 as a recreation of the regionalist German-Hanoverian Party that had been active in the period between the creation of the German Empire and the rise of the Nazi Party. The NLP called for the establishment of a Lower Saxon state within a federal Germany and sought to represent Christian conservatism.

In 1947, after the state of Lower Saxony had been created, the party adopted the name German Party (Deutsche Partei, DP).
