= Hermann-Eberhard Wildermuth =

German politician (1890–1952)

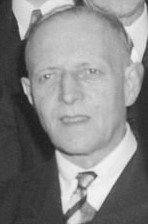

Federal Minister of Public Housing
- In office 20 September 1949 – 9 March 1952
- President: Theodor Heuss
- Prime Minister: Konrad Adenauer
- Preceded by: Position created
- Succeeded by: Fritz Neumayer

Personal details
- Born: 23 October 1890 Stuttgart, German Empire
- Died: 9 March 1952 (aged 61) Tübingen, West Germany
- Cabinet: First Adenauer cabinet
- Awards: Knight's Cross of the Iron Cross

Military service
- Allegiance: German Empire (to 1918); Weimar Republic (to 1921); Nazi Germany
- Branch/service: Army
- Years of service: 1908–1921 ?–1945
- Rank: Oberst
- Battles/wars: World War I World War II: Battle of France; Invasion of Yugoslavia; Battles of Rzhev; Italian campaign; Invasion of Normandy; Operation Astonia

Hermann-Eberhard Wildermuth (23 October 1890 – 9 March 1952) was a German politician and a member of the FDP/DVP. From 1949 until his death he was the Federal Minister for Housing under Konrad Adenauer. During World War II Wildermuth was a highly decorated colonel in the Wehrmacht and was awarded the Knight's Cross of the Iron Cross. He was a grandson of the Swabian writer Ottilie Wildermuth.

== Early life and career ==
After Wildermuth completed secondary schooling in 1908 he studied law and political sciences in Tübingen, Leipzig and Berlin from 1909 to 1914. In Tübingen, Wildermuth was a member of the South German liberal fraternity "Academic Society Stuttgardia". Here he met future political associates Reinhold Maier, Karl Georg Pfleiderer, Konrad Wittwer and Wolfgang Haussmann. After graduation in 1921 Wildermuth worked at the Imperial Institute for Job Placement and Unemployment in Berlin, and later as a senior executive officer eventually worked in the Ministry of Labour. From 1928 Wildermuth was director of Deutsche Bank's construction operations and in addition from 1930, board member, later president of the German Society for Public Works.

== Military service ==
Wildermuth served in 1908/09 as a one-year volunteer in the 1st Württemberg Infantry Regiment. He returned as an officer of this regiment in the First World War, serving from 1914 to 1918 on the Western and Eastern Fronts and in Italy. From 1919 to 1921 he was commander of a battalion composed of students in Tübingen to quell uprisings against the Weimar republic. His main enemies in this period were the (Communist) Spartacus League, who returned the compliment by putting a price on his head. At the outbreak of the Second World War Wildermuth was drafted as a reserve major and during the Battle of France was commander of the Second Battalion of Infantry Regiment 272. In 1941/42 he served as commander of Infantry Regiment 737 in Serbia, where he was promoted to lieutenant colonel in December 1941. During this period he was ordered to undertake mass shootings in reprisal for partisan activity, but later stated that he never carried out such orders (though officers in nearby zones clearly did). As of 1 May 1942, Wildermuth was commander of Infantry Regiment 371 at Army Group Center on the Eastern Front and then from May 1943 as commander of Infantry Regiment 578 in Italy.

On 12 August 1944 Wildermuth became "Fortress Commandant" of Le Havre in France. This came as a disappointment; he had hoped for a corps. Before taking his new command, however, he swore the 'customary oath' to Hitler: to defend the fortress to the last man, and only to surrender with the authorisation of his superiors. This oath to Hitler was, broadly speaking, respected by Wildermuth. At his interrogation by the British in January 1945, he stated that his aim had been to deny the Allies the use of the port, and to tie down as many Allied troops as possible, and that this had been achieved to his own satisfaction, since two British infantry divisions and about 150 tanks were assigned to the siege of Le Havre for almost fourteen days. Furthermore, while Wildermuth personally surrendered to British troops on 12 September, after being wounded in the thigh, he refused to order the surrender of the garrison on the ground that as a prisoner of war he no longer had any authority to do so.

Prior to the early September launch of the British-led Operation Astonia to take the port city Wildermuth had requested that French citizens be evacuated before heavy pre-assault naval and air bombardment commenced. His offer was rebuffed by Lt-General John Crocker, in command of the 1st British Corps which had laid siege to the city. Crocker would later argue that if Wildermuth cared about the civilian population, he could have surrendered the garrison before the bombing began, and that acceding to Wildermuth's request would have served only the German interest, by gaining time and removing potentially disruptive French civilians from the defended fortress.

Upon his 12 September surrender Wildermuth was interned in England at the Trent Park senior officers' prisoner of war camp. British intelligence considered Wildermuth a convinced patriot and brave officer but vehemently opposed the Nazi regime. In a wiretapped conversation in Trent Park, Carl Friedrich Goerdeler said that Wildermuth had in May 1944 been willing to participate in a coup against Hitler. He may have been influenced in this by the knowledge gained from his brother, a doctor, that the Nazis had murdered at least 100,000 mentally ill patients. In the end, however, he took no part in the plot, and would certainly not have been placed in command of Le Havre had Hitler suspected him.

At Trent Park, he and other captured officers were invited by the British in early 1945 to call publicly on the Wehrmacht to surrender. Although Wildermuth was cautiously interested, the initiative came to nothing, perhaps because of the officers' fears of reprisals against their families. In other respects, however, Wildermuth largely justified the confidence placed in him by his British captors. His vision of post-war Germany was remarkably lucid: he expected the division between East and West, he expected the West to become an anti-Communist state, he expected the Allies to seek to rebuild democracy there from the local level up, and he knew that they would quickly need the help of German elites. With this in mind, he prepared two papers for the British while at Trent Park, one on the German banking system and its key personalities and one on the German system of local and regional government. For the benefit of his German fellow-captives, meanwhile, he led a seminar on war crimes trials.

== Political career ==
In 1918 Wildermuth was a member of a soldier Council and joined the left-liberal DDP party in 1919.

After the war he joined the DVP. From 1947 to 1949, Wildermuth was a member of the FDP / DVP regional executive committee. In 1948 he was elected to the FDP Federal Executive. Wildermuth was next to Carl-Hubert Schwennicke from Berlin as the only candidate receiving all 89 delegate votes. From January 1952 until his death, he was Deputy National Chairman of the FDP. From 1947 to 1950 Wildermuth was a member of the Landtag of Württemberg-Hohenzollern and from 1949 until his death was also a member of the German Bundestag.

In 1946 Wildermuth was appointed Secretary of State for Economics in the Württemberg-Hohenzollern provisional government. From 22 July 1947 until 20 September 1949 he was then Minister of Economic Affairs of Württemberg-Hohenzollern in the cabinet of Gebhard Müller.

After the general election in 1949 he was on 20 September 1949 appointed Federal Minister for Reconstruction (from 1950: Federal Minister for Housing) in the First cabinet of Chancellor Konrad Adenauer. He is one of the few federal ministers who died in office.

Wildermuth was constantly aware of the difficulty of his work. The German "economic miracle" had not yet begun, but the devastated West Germany had lost several million homes. He therefore sponsored the "First Housing Act". In the year of its enactment, (1950) 370,000 housing units were completed. Overall, more than four million homes were built with assistance provided by this Act in the eight years to 1957.

He was highly regarded even by political opponents. The Social Democratic press wrote about his death: it was "here was a man divorced from political life, his human decency, businesslike effort and democratic reliability were always appreciated by the opposition."

Wildermuth, who had himself been severely wounded in both world wars, particularly supported the construction of wheelchair accessible homes for severely disabled veterans.

== Honours and legacy ==
Wildermuth was highly decorated in both World Wars. During the First World War Wildermuth earned the Iron Cross 2nd Class and 1st Class in 1914; he also earned two awards for wounds and the Honor Cross. In the Second World War he again earned the Iron Cross 2nd Class and 1st Class, both in 1939, was awarded the Knight's Cross of the Iron Cross in 1940, and the German Cross in Gold on Christmas Day in 1942.

Various streets in German cities are named after Eberhard Wildermuth, including in Hamburg (Wildermuthring) and Kassel and Herne (Eberhard Wildermuth Street). The barracks of the border and Railway Police Office in Stuttgart and the 5th Riot police department in Böblingen were renamed "Eberhard Wildermuth Barracks" in 1965. In Tübingen, new housing estates built in the 1960s and 1970s on the Denzenberg were also named after Wildermuth.

== Awards and decorations ==
- Iron Cross (1914)
  - 2nd Class
  - 1st Class
- Wound Badge (1914)
  - in Black
  - in Silver
- Honour Cross of the World War 1914/1918
- Iron Cross (1939)
  - 2nd Class
  - 1st Class
- Knight's Cross of the Iron Cross on 15 August 1940 as Major of the Reserves and commander of the II./Infanterie-Regiment 272
- German Cross in Gold on 25 December 1942
