= Fritz Neumayer =

German politician (1884–1973)

German Federal Minister of Justice
- In office 1953–1956
- Preceded by: Thomas Dehler
- Succeeded by: Hans-Joachim von Merkatz

Federal Minister of Public Housing
- In office 9 March 1952 – 20 October 1953
- Preceded by: Hermann-Eberhard Wildermuth
- Succeeded by: Victor-Emanuel Preusker

Personal details
- Born: 29 July 1884 Kaiserslautern, Germany
- Died: 12 April 1973 (aged 88) Munich, Germany
- Resting place: Kaiserslautern
- Party: Free Democratic Party (FDP), Freie Volkspartei (FVP)
- Education: University of Würzburg
- Profession: Lawyer, politician

Fritz Neumayer (29 July 1884 – 12 April 1973) was a German politician. He was Federal Minister of Building from 1952 to 1953, and Federal Minister of Justice from 1953 to 1956.

== Early life ==
Neumayer was born at Kaiserslautern, Germany. Both his father and his grandfather were lawyers and liberal members of parliament. Neumayer studied law at Würzburg, Berlin, Leipzig and Strasbourg. After his graduation in 1911, he practiced law in his native city of Kaiserslautern until 1945, except for the time of military service.

== Political career ==
After World War II, Neumayer joined the newly founded liberal party of the western occupation zones, the Free Democratic Party (FDP). Also in 1945, he became president of the state court in Kaiserslautern. He was elected to the advisory state board of the newly founded state of Rhineland-Palatinate in 1946, and to the respective state parliament in 1947. When Rhineland-Palatinate became a constituent state of the Federal Republic of Germany in 1949, Neumayer was elected to the federal parliament, where his primary concern was ensuring the independence of judges from the state.

After the death of the liberal minister for building, Hermann-Eberhard Wildermuth, in 1952, Neumayer led the ministry until the 1953 West German federal election. After the election, he became Federal Minister of Justice, and worked primarily on reforming the criminal law. He furthered judicial gender equality with a law of early 1954, though "according to the natural order" (Note: "...nach der natürlichen Ordnung". Fritz Neumayer as cited in Bänsch (1985), p.427) granting a husband the right to issue binding decisions for his spouse if the wellbeing of the family was not endangered.

Neumayer also furthered an extension to the amnesty of 1949, resulting in the amnesty law of 17 July 1954. In Neumayer's words, the law was to "rule off crimes committed directly or collaterally in the context of the conditions of a chaotic time period". (Note: "...einen Schlußstrich unter die Straftaten ziehen, die in unmittelbarem und mittelbarem Zusammenhang mit den Verhältnissen einer chaotischen Zeit begangen worden sind." Fritz Neumayer, as cited in Schröm (2002), p.86 and Frei (1996), p.102) Amnestied were people convicted of crimes up to manslaughter, but not murder, committed between 1 October 1944 and 31 July 1945 in the assumption of a legitimacy of their action, especially by following orders, or out of an emergency. The law also provided for the clearance of several such crimes in the official registries.

In 1956, Neumayer together with all other liberal federal ministers left the FDP to join the newly founded Freie Volkspartei (FVP). In the same year, West German chancellor Konrad Adenauer dismissed him from his office, giving his high age as the reason.

== Later life ==
Neumayer, who was married with four children, spent the later part of his life in Munich. He was Honorary Chairman of the supervisory board of the Pfaff AG. He died on April 12, 1973, in Munich, and was buried in Kaiserslautern.

== Bibliography ==
- Dittberner, Jürgen (2005). "Kurzbiographien". Die FDP: Geschichte, Personen, Organisation, Perspektiven; eine Einführung (in German). VS Verlag. ISBN 3-531-14050-7.
- Schröm, Oliver; Röpke, Andrea (2002). "Die stillen Helfer und ihre politischen Freunde". Stille Hilfe für braune Kameraden: das geheime Netzwerk der Alt- und Neonazis (in German) (2 ed.). Ch. Links Verlag. ISBN 3-86153-266-2.
- Freudiger, Kerstin (2002). "Rahmenbedingungen für die Verfolgung von NS-Verbrechen". Die juristische Aufarbeitung von NS-Verbrechen (in German). Mohr Siebeck. ISBN 3-16-147687-5.
- Frei, Norbert (1996). Vergangenheitspolitik: die Anfänge der Bundesrepublik und die NS-Vergangenheit (in German) (2 ed.). C.H.Beck. ISBN 3-406-41310-2.
- Bänsch, Dieter (1985). Die Fünfziger Jahre: Beiträge zu Politik und Kultur (in German) (2 ed.). Gunter Narr Verlag. ISBN 3-87808-385-8.
