= Franz Blücher =

German politician; first vice-chancellor of the FRG (1896–1959)

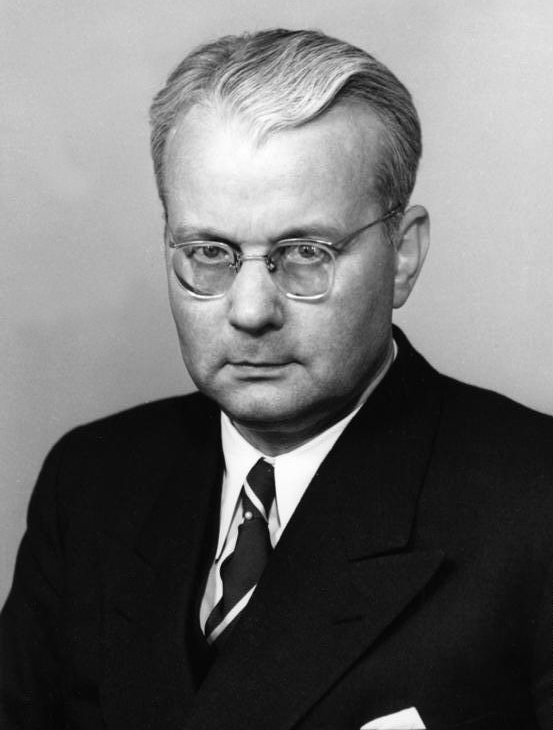
- Blücher in 1950

Vice-Chancellor of West Germany
- In office 20 September 1949 – 29 October 1957
- Chancellor: Konrad Adenauer
- Preceded by: Franz von Papen (1934; as Vice-Chancellor of Germany)
- Succeeded by: Ludwig Erhard

Minister for Matters of the Marshall Plan (Note: Later renamed Minister for Economic Cooperation in 1953)
- In office 20 September 1949 – 29 October 1957
- Chancellor: Konrad Adenauer
- Preceded by: Office established
- Succeeded by: Hermann Lindrath (as Minister for the Federal Patrimony)

Member of the Bundestag
- In office 7 September 1949 – 28 February 1958
- Preceded by: Constituency established
- Succeeded by: Georg Ripken
- Constituency: North Rhine-Westphalia state list (1949–1957); Göttingen – Münden (1957–1958)

Personal details
- Born: 24 March 1896 Essen, Kingdom of Prussia, Germany
- Died: 26 March 1959 (aged 63) Bad Godesberg, West Germany
- Party: German Party (after 1957)
- Other political affiliations: FDP (1946–1956); FVP (1956–1957)

Franz Blücher (24 March 1896 – 26 March 1959) was a German politician and member of the German Parliament (Bundestag).

== Biography ==
Blücher was born in Essen, Kingdom of Prussia.

After the end of World War II, he was one of the founders of the Free Democratic Party (FDP) and served as chairman in the British occupation zone (1946–1949) and as Federal Chairman (1949–1954).

From 1949 to 1957, Blücher was a member of Chancellor Konrad Adenauer's cabinet. As representative of the second-largest government party, he was the first vice-chancellor of West Germany and also held the Ministry for Matters of the Marshall Plan, which in 1953 was renamed Ministry for Economic Cooperation.

In 1956, Blücher – along with other fifteen ministers and parliamentarians – sided with Chancellor Adenauer against his party and formed the Free People's Party (FVP), which early in 1957 merged with the German Party (DP).

Blücher died on 26 March 1959 in Bad Godesberg, Bonn, West Germany.

== Honours and awards ==
Blücher was awarded honorary doctorates from the University of Berlin (1954) and the University of the Punjab in Lahore (1957). In 1954, he was awarded the Grand Cross of the Order of Merit and the Grand Cross of the Greek Order of George I. In 1955, he received the Grand Cross of Merit of the Italian Republic.

In 1956, Blücher received the Grand Decoration of Honour in Gold with Sash for Services to the Republic of Austria.

== Notes ==
Political offices
Preceded by Franz von Papen	Vice-Chancellor of Germany; 1949 – 1957	Succeeded by Ludwig Erhard
