= Heinrich Hellwege =

German politician (1908–1991)

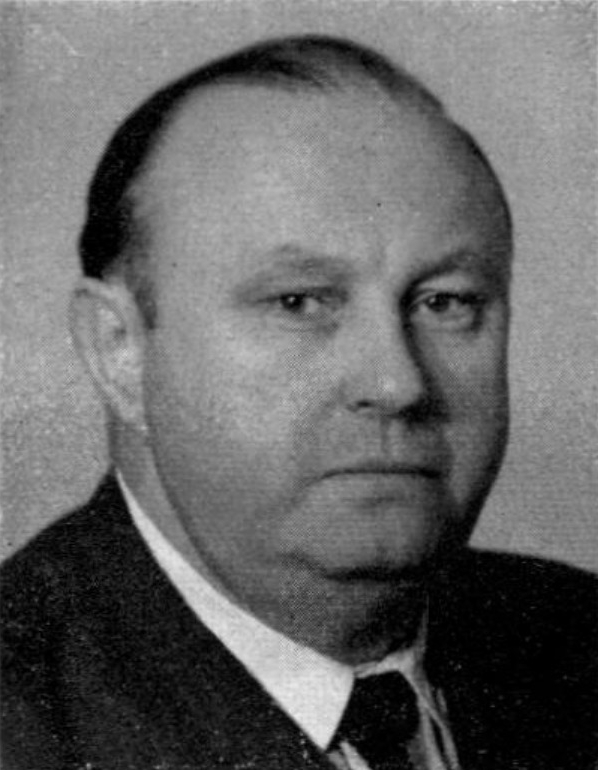
- Official portrait, 1953

Minister-President of Lower Saxony
- In office 26 May 1955 – 12 May 1959
- Preceded by: Hinrich Wilhelm Kopf
- Succeeded by: Hinrich Wilhelm Kopf

Minister for Bundesrat Affairs
- In office 20 September 1949 – 26 May 1955
- Chancellor: Konrad Adenauer
- Preceded by: Office established
- Succeeded by: Hans-Joachim von Merkatz

Member of the Bundestag; for Stade – Bremervörde
- In office 7 September 1949 – 27 May 1955
- Preceded by: Constituency established
- Succeeded by: Margot Kalinke

Member of the Landtag of Lower Saxony
- In office 13 June 1951 – 7 January 1952
- Preceded by: Multi-member district
- Succeeded by: Alois Scherf
- Constituency: State list
- In office 9 December 1946 – 2 November 1950
- Preceded by: Constituency established
- Succeeded by: Hermann Hinrich Krudop
- Constituency: State list (1946–1947); Bremervörde (1947–1950)

Personal details
- Born: Heinrich Peter Hellwege; 18 August 1908 Neuenkirchen, Germany
- Died: 4 October 1991 (aged 83) Neuenkirchen, Germany
- Party: Christian Democratic Union (after 1961)
- Other political affiliations: DHP (before 1933); DP (1947–1961)
- Education: Athenaeum Stade

Heinrich Peter Hellwege (18 August 1908 – 4 October 1991) was a German politician for the German-Hanoverian Party, DP and CDU. Hellwege was Federal Minister for Affairs of the Federal Council from 1949 to 1955 and Minister-President of Lower Saxony from 1955 to 1959.

When he left secondary school in 1926, he started to work as a commercial clerk in Hamburg until in 1933 when he joined the family business for six years. During World War II, he served with the Luftwaffe. After the war, Hellwege turned into a political entrepreneur who founded a political party, the Niedersächsische Landespartei (NLP), later renamed to the DP, and began his own political career. The first and the last position held by Hellwege was M.P. in the state legislature of Lower Saxony from 1947 to 1949 and from 1959 to 1963. Between 1947 and 1961, he was national chairman of the German Party (Deutsche Partei). When the DP started to fade away, Hellwege joined the Christian Democratic Union from 1961 to 1979 without ever being a candidate for that party.

== See also ==
- German Party

== Bibliography ==
- Claudius Schmidt: Heinrich Hellwege, der vergessene Gründervater: Ein politisches Lebensbild. Stade: Landschaftsverband der Ehemaligen Herzogtümer Bremen und Verden, 1991, ISBN 3-9801919-2-3 (Ph.D. dissertation, Berlin: Free University, 1990)
- Joachim Detjen: 'Heinrich Hellwege', in: Udo Kempf and Hans-Georg Merz (eds.), Kanzler und Minister 1949–1998. Biografisches Lexikon der deutschen Bundesregierungen, Wiesbaden: Westdeutscher Verlag, 2001, pp. 316–320.
