= German Party (1947) =

German Party Deutsche Partei
- Chairman: Heinrich Hellwege
- Founded: 1947
- Dissolved: 15 April 1961
- Preceded by: Lower Saxony State Party; German National People's Party (factions)
- Succeeded by: All-German Party; German Party (1961)
- Ideology: National conservatism; Monarchism
- Political position: Right-wing or far-right

The German Party (German: Deutsche Partei, DP) was a national-conservative and monarchist political party in West Germany active during the post-war years. The party's ideology appealed to sentiments of German nationalism and nostalgia for the German Empire.

== History ==
=== Founding ===
In 1945 the Lower Saxony National Party (Niedersächsische Landespartei, NLP) was founded as a re-creation of the regionalist German-Hanoverian Party that had been active in the period between the creation of the German Empire in 1871 and the Nazi Party's seizure of power in 1933. Two groups of people initiated the process: one around Ludwig Alpers and Heinrich Hellwege in Stade, the other around Georg Ludewig, Karl Biester, Wolfgang Kwiecinski, and Arthur Menge in Hanover. On May 23, 1946, Heinrich Hellwege, Landrat in Stade, was formally elected to serve as chairman of the NLP. The NLP aimed principally at the establishment of a Lower Saxon state within a federal Germany as well as representing Protestant conservatism.

In 1947, a year after the establishment of Lower Saxony as a state, the party renamed itself the German Party and merged with conservative groups that were members of the German National People's Party. It soon expanded into neighbouring states under the chairmanship of Heinrich Hellwege and gained 27 seats (18.1 per cent of the total) in the first Lower Saxon Landtag election in 1947. It sent two delegates to Bonn to serve in the constitutional convention (Parlamentarischer Rat) of 1948/49. The German Party was among the parties that supported a market economy in the Bizonal Economic Council, thus laying the groundwork for the "bourgeois coalition" in power in Bonn between 1949 and 1956.

=== Coalition ===
In the 1949 federal election, the party received 4% of the national vote and won 18 seats. As a result, it became a coalition partner of the Christian Democratic Union (CDU), the Christian Social Union (CSU) and the Free Democratic Party (FDP) in the government of Konrad Adenauer. The DP vote fell to 3.3% with 15 seats in the 1953 federal election, although it retained its place in the governing coalition and again in 1957 federal election when the DP garnered 17 seats with 3.4% of the vote. A short-lived Free People's Party (FVP) had been formed in 1956 by Franz Blücher, Fritz Neumayer and others who had left the FDP, but the following year the FVP merged into the German Party, possibly contributing to a slight increase in the DP vote in 1957. German Party ministers in these governments were Heinrich Hellwege (1949–1955), Hans-Joachim von Merkatz (1955–1960) and Hans-Christoph Seebohm (1949–1960). In 1955 Hellwege resigned his federal office to become the Minister President of Lower Saxony.

The party opposed a planned economy, land reform and co-determination. The German Party of the 1950s has been characterized as a "party of the indigenous Lower Saxonian middle class", that emphasized states' rights and monarchist and partially also nationalist (völkisch) positions.

=== Decline ===
The German Party had been instrumental in setting an electoral threshold (either five per cent of the national vote or alternatively three constituency seats) for all parties contesting a federal election and this led to problems when the CDU refused to allow German Party candidates a free run for a reasonable number of constituency seats as it had done in the 1957 election. With the DP facing elimination from the Bundestag, nine of its 17 parliamentary incumbents left the party to join the CDU. As a result, the German Party quit the government in 1960, a year before the next federal election, and merged with the All-German Bloc/League of Expellees and Deprived of Rights (GB/BHE) to form the All-German Party (Gesamtdeutsche Partei, GDP).

However, 2.8 per cent of the vote in the 1961 federal election did not win the GDP representation in the national parliament (Bundestag). A merger of two parties, which represented opposing voter blocs (indigenous peasants of Lower Saxony and German expellees and refugees from the eastern territories), had turned into a political disaster unforeseen by the national party elites. The DP last entered a state parliament by winning four deputies in the Bremen state election of 1963. A year later, however, the deputies were involved in the founding of the far-right National Democratic Party of Germany (NPD).

== Electoral history ==
=== Bundestag ===
Election	Leader	Constituency		Party list		Seats	+/–	Government
Election	Leader	Votes	%	Votes	%	Seats	+/–	Government
1949	Heinrich Hellwege			939,934	3.9% (#7)	17 / 402		CDU/CSU–FDP–DP
1953	Heinrich Hellwege	1,073,031	3.9% (#6)	896,128	3.3% (#6)	15 / 509	▼2	CDU/CSU–FDP–DP
1957	Heinrich Hellwege	1,062,293	3.5% (#6)	1,007,282	3.4% (#6)	17 / 519	▲2	Opposition

== Bibliography ==
- Rudolph Holzgräber: 'Die Deutsche Partei. Partei eines neuen Konservativismus', in: Max Gustav Lange et al., Parteien in der Bundesrepublik. Studien zur Entwicklung der deutschen Parteien bis zur Bundestagswahl 1953. Stuttgart: Ring-Verlag, 1955, pp. 407–449.
- Hermann Meyn: Die Deutsche Partei. Entwicklung und Problematik einer national-konservativen Rechtspartei nach 1945. Düsseldorf: Droste Verlag, 1965.
- Hermann Meyn: 'Die Deutsche Partei. Ursachen des Scheitern einer national-konservativen Rechtspartei im Nachkriegsdeutschland', in: Politische Vierteljahresschrift, vol. 6, 1965, pp. 42–57.
- Horst W. Schmollinger, 'Die Deutsche Partei', in: Richard Stöss (ed.), Parteien-Handbuch. 2nd ed., Opladen: Westdeutscher Verlag, 1986, vol. 2, pp. 1025–1111, ISBN 3-531-11838-2.
- Karl-Heinz Nassmacher et al.: Parteien im Abstieg. Wiederbegründung und Niedergang der Bauern- und Bürgerparteien in Niedersachsen. Opladen: Westdeutscher Verlag, 1989, ISBN 3-531-12084-0.
- Ingo Nathusius: Am rechten Rand der Union. Der Weg der Deutschen Partei bis 1953, phil. Diss., Mainz 1992 (no ISBN available).
- Michael Kle[in: Westdeutscher Protestantismus und politische Parteien. Anti-Parteien-Mentalität und parteipollitisches Engagement von 1945 bis 1963, Tübingen: Mohr Siebeck, 2005, ISBN 3-16-148493-2.
