= Free People's Party (Germany) =

Political party

The Free People's Party (Freie Volkspartei) was a short-lived German political party. It was a splinter party formed in 1956 when several ministers broke away from the Free Democratic Party. These included Franz Blücher, Fritz Neumayer and others. However, the following year it merged into the German Party.
