= Listenkandidat =

In Germany, a listenkandidat (English: list candidate) is elected via an electoral list drawn up by a political party or a voters' association, usually by proportional representation. Depending on the electoral system, the voter has more or less influence on the people who are elected with his or her vote. The counterpart to the list candidate is the direct candidate (Direktmandat).

In German federal elections, only state lists are elected with the second vote, and the ranking of candidates is fixed according to the federal election law. It is decided by the respective party before the election, and according to the party law, this must be done in a democratic manner.

The Bavarian state election system allows voters to choose a direct candidate with their first vote and a candidate on one of the lists with their second vote. The strength of the parties in the state parliament (Landtag) is determined by the ratio of the total number of votes. For each party, the candidates who received the most votes on their list (sum of first and second votes) are considered. Voters therefore have limited influence on the order of the candidates. In Finland, the parties put together lists, but voters vote for a specific candidate in elections to the Finnish Parliament and the European Parliament. Only the number of votes is decisive for the election result, not the original order of the candidates on the ballot paper.

In local elections, voters typically have several votes, sometimes as many as there are seats to be filled. By cumulative and panachage voting, they can essentially put together their own list from the offers of the various parties.

In most parliamentary elections in Switzerland, cumulation and panachage are also possible. However, in most cantons, the Council of States is elected using the winner-take-all system, as are almost all executive bodies.
