= Federal elections in Germany =

Elections to the German parliament

Results of the federal elections and subsequently formed governments

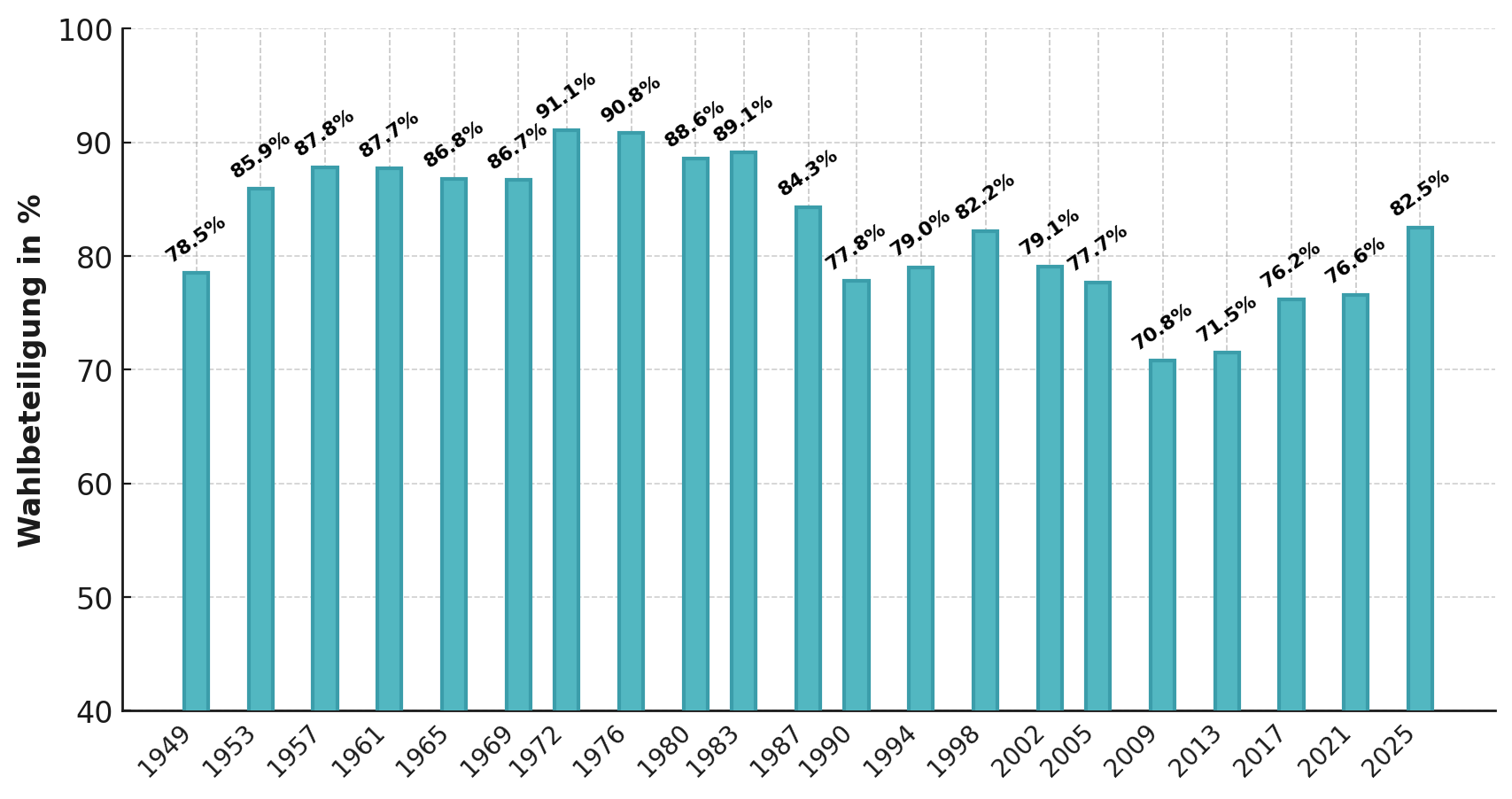
Participation in German federal elections

Federal elections in Germany (German: Bundestagswahl) determine the members of the German Bundestag (MdB). According to Article 39 of the Basic Law, it generally takes place every four years, on a sunday between 46 and 48 months after a new Bundestag had assembled; However, the electoral period may be shortened in the event of the dissolution of the Bundestag (Articles 63 and 68 of the Basic Law, invoked four times) or extended in the event of a state of defence (Article 115h of the Basic Law). The date of a Bundestag election is set by the Federal President in consultation with the Federal Government and the 16 states. These elections are significant for the federal level, thus also for the election of a president every five years.

The Bundestag electoral law, which is laid down in the Federal Election Act, is based on the principle of personalized proportional representation with a five percent threshold. Both winners of the 299 federal constituencies, and at least 299 candidates from party lists in 16 states may win a seat, which would result in 598 seats when a strong Two-party system is in effect. With additional parties shifting proportions, the number of members of parliament had varied significantly and was rather unpredictable. Reunited Germany in 1990 started with 662 seats, then dropped to 603 in 2002. With the two-party system eroding to a multi party system, the number of seats grew to 736 in 2021 as 18.6% won and lost a constituency. The number of seats then was fixed to 630 at the expense of the least successful constituency winners, with 23 getting left out in 2025, and only 276 becoming MdB this way. The 21st Bundestag elected in 2025 is the first to have 630 members, the majority having been pre-selected by their parties, some MdB not standing in any constituency, and some constituencies not represented at all.

The 23 February 2025 German federal election was a snap election, the Next German federal election is expected to be held no later than between January and March 2029.

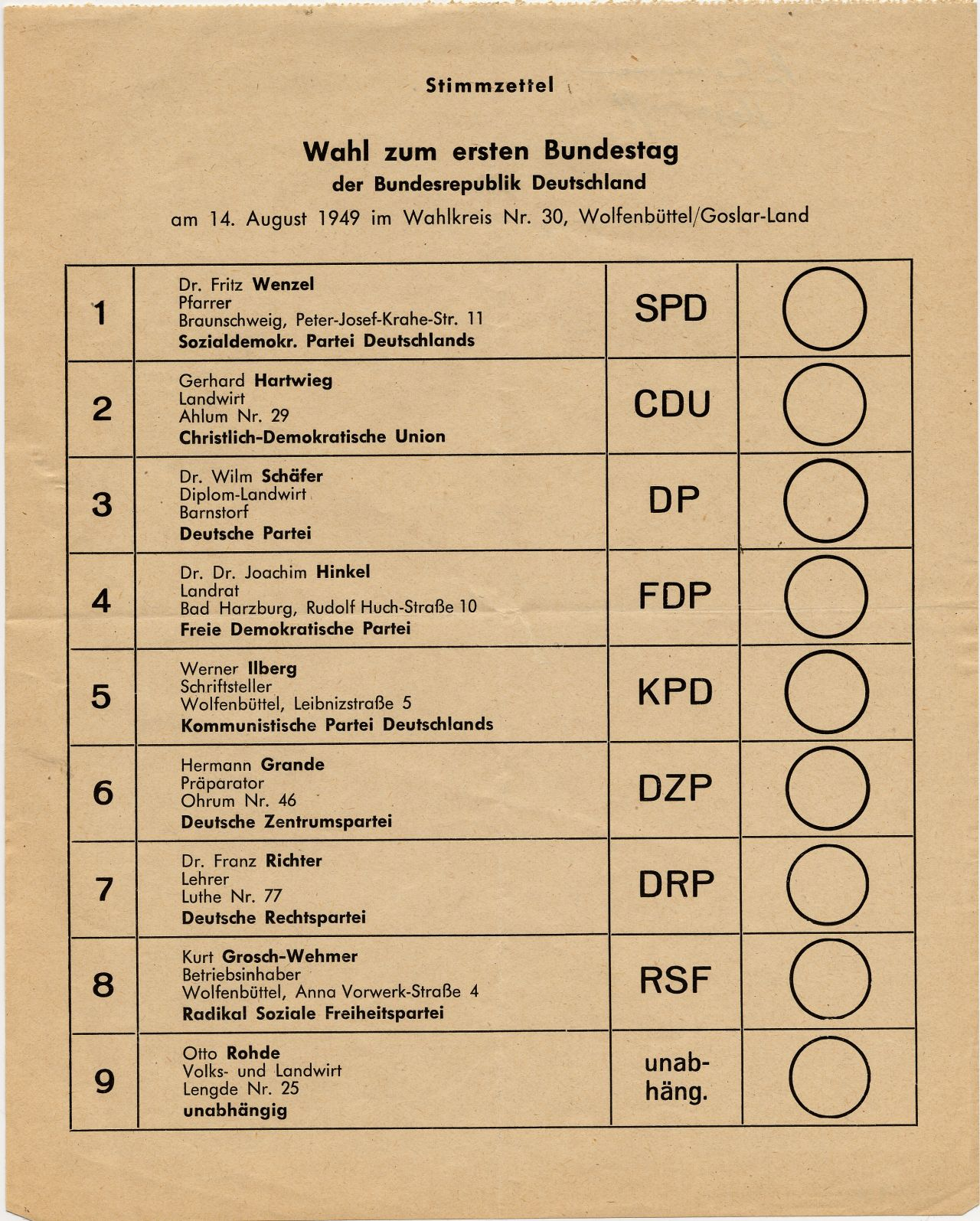
Ballot papers at the first federal election in 1949

== General ==
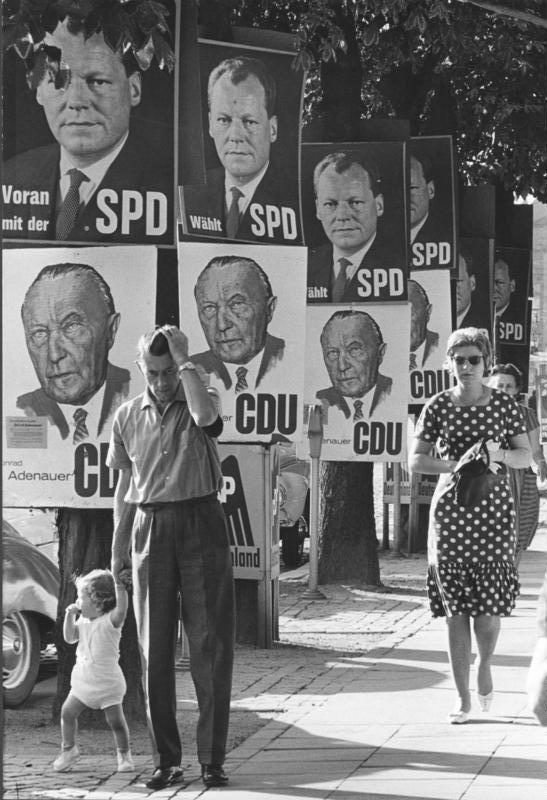
Election posters during the 1961 federal election campaign

Article 38, paragraph 1, sentence 1 of the Basic Law stipulates that federal elections must be “general, free, direct, equal and secret”.

- Universal suffrage means that every citizen of adult age has the right to vote and be elected, regardless of origin, religious affiliation, political opinion or gender.
- Freedom of choice means that voters should be able to form their own opinions freely and express their opinions honestly. Furthermore, "freedom of choice" means that every eligible voter can freely decide whether to vote at all. Thus, unlike in Belgium, for example, there is no compulsory voting in Germany.
- Immediacy means that the people entitled to vote elect their representatives directly and are not represented by electors, as is the case, for example, in the election of the Federal President, who is elected by the Federal Assembly.
- According to the established case law of the Federal Constitutional Court (BVerfG), equality means for the existing Bundestag electoral law “that all citizens can exercise their active and passive right to vote in a formally equal manner as far as possible and that the votes of those entitled to vote in the proportional representation system not only have the same counting value but also, in principle, the same success value.” Therefore, the counting and success value must not be dependent on property, income, tax payment, education, religion, race, gender, political opinion or electoral districts that are too different in size.
- An election must be secret to ensure freedom of choice. This means that it must be ensured that no one can learn about a particular voter's decision.

=== Eligibility to vote ===
According to Article 38, Paragraph 3 of the Basic Law (GG), a federal law regulates all details relating to elections. This is the Federal Election Law (BWahlG). According to this law, all eligible voters may vote (active right to vote) and also be elected (passive right to vote). According to Article 38, Paragraph 2 of the Basic Law (GG), all those who are German within the meaning of Article 116, Paragraph 1 of the Basic Law and who have reached the age of 18 on election day are eligible to vote. One can run as a party candidate – even without being a party member – in the constituency or on the state list, or run as an independent candidate in the constituency.

Germans living abroad are eligible to vote if they have lived in Germany continuously for at least three months after reaching the age of 14 and if no more than 25 years have passed since they left. Other Germans living abroad may only vote if they "have acquired personal and direct familiarity with the political situation in the Federal Republic of Germany for other reasons and are affected by it".

== Before the election ==
=== Admission to the election ===
In the federal election, on the one hand, direct candidates are elected locally who represent their constituency at the federal level, and on the other hand, parties that are eligible for election via state lists in their respective federal state.

According to Section 27 of the BWahlG, parties that are not already continuously represented in the Bundestag or in a state parliament (based on their own nominations) with at least five members, as well as individual candidates, must collect supporting signatures in order to be able to participate in the Bundestag election.

In each federal state in which the party wishes to run with its own state list, it requires the signatures of 0.1% of the number of eligible voters in the last federal election or 2,000 eligible voters, whichever is lower. To submit a district election proposal, 200 signatures of eligible voters in the constituency are required ( Section 20 (2) and (3) of the Federal Election Act).

=== List of candidates ===
To elect direct candidates, the parties hold local district party conferences, for which, however, special rules apply: For example, only members who are resident in the constituency and are themselves eligible to vote there are entitled to vote.

Each federal state has its own party lists for election. These are drawn up at state party conferences ("representative assemblies"), with the most promising candidates usually ranked individually for each list position, and only the lower list positions are elected in a joint bloc vote. A certain regional proportionality usually plays a role in the ranking, and for some parties, quota regulations (such as a women's quota) also play a role.

==== Chancellor candidate ====
In the federal election, it is not the Federal Chancellor who is elected, but the members of parliament. Nevertheless, the unofficial nomination of a candidate for chancellor before the federal election, which is not provided for in the Basic Law or Federal Election Law, has become established in political practice. Previously, the opposition People's Party (Peasant Party) had chosen this candidate before the start of the election campaign, while the governing party had usually run with the incumbent Chancellor as its candidate. The smaller parties usually nominate prominent "top candidates." These are usually elected by a federal party conference, which also adopts the federal election platform.

The candidate for chancellor often travels abroad before the election campaign, to the USA, France, United Kingdom, Israel, Russia, and the country holding the EU Council presidency. Regarding the trip to the USA, the so-called "presidential minutes" attract attention among the German public. This is the time the American president takes to talk with the candidate for chancellor, which is also seen as an indication of how likely the American president considers a change of government.

There is no set procedure for selecting a candidate for chancellor. Before the nomination, the issue receives considerable public attention, known as the " K Question":

- The selection process for the CDU and CSU is determined by the basic constellation of two independent sister parties. In 1979, for example, there was a close vote in the joint parliamentary group between the Minister-President of Lower Saxony, Ernst Albrecht, and the Minister-President of Bavaria, Franz Josef Strauß, over the candidate for chancellor in the 1980 federal election. However, the leaders of both parties usually reach an informal agreement in the run-up to the election.
- With the exception of 2002 (Guido Westerwelle, FDP), 2021 (Annalena Baerbock, Alliance 90/The Greens), and 2025 (Robert Habeck, Greens; Alice Weidel, AfD; Sahra Wagenknecht, BSW), the smaller parties represented in the Bundestag did not nominate a candidate for chancellor, but only one or two top candidates. Occasionally, splinter parties also nominate their own candidates for chancellor.
- While Helmut Kohl (CDU) and Erich Ollenhauer (SPD) ran again after one failed candidacy, and Willy Brandt (SPD) even after two failed candidacies, no unsuccessful candidate ran a second time as top candidate after 1983.

Of the 22 candidates for chancellor, 17 were elected chairmen of their parties during their careers; two others, Johannes Rau and Frank-Walter Steinmeier, served only provisionally. Only Helmut Schmidt, Peer Steinbrück, and Olaf Scholz never served as party chairmen. Fourteen candidates for chancellor served as federal ministers during their careers, and eleven as heads of government of a federal state. At the time of their candidacies, the opposition candidates were four times the chairmen of the respective Bundestag parliamentary group, nine times the incumbent head of government of a federal state, and two times a sitting federal minister.

=== Election campaign and decision-making aids ===
The local election campaign is usually organized by the constituency candidates themselves, supported (for example, by putting up election posters) by their local party branches and volunteers. In addition, there is usually a nationwide election campaign, which is set by the federal parties.

As the federal election campaign evolves into a media-based campaign, it is increasingly tailored to voters watching on television and the internet, as it can reach more people than street campaigning, which continues, nonetheless. Posters featuring leading candidates and television advertisements are intended to convince citizens to vote for a particular party. According to a study by the Foundation for Future Issues, this campaign advertising on posters and at stands in the city center has almost completely lost its significance in the 2013 federal election campaign and no longer plays a role in the voting decision.

In addition to posters, various discussions with leading candidates from government and opposition parties serve as decision-making aids for the election, for example on television. The print media often also offer short summaries of the respective party manifestos. The same applies to the "Wahl-O-Mat" which aims to provide citizens with decision-making assistance based on selected theses. Both the short summaries and the Wahl-O-Mat website save voters the trouble of reading the election manifestos of all parties. Furthermore, there is the opportunity to ask questions to members of parliament on various websites.

== Sequence ==
=== Election date ===
The provisions of Article 39 paragraphs 1 and 2 of the Basic Law on the election of the German Bundestag read as amended by the Basic Law of 16 July 1998 ( Federal Law Gazette I p. 1822 ), which was first applied in the 2002 federal election:

(1) Subject to the following provisions, the Bundestag shall be elected for a term of four years. Its electoral term shall end with the convening of a new Bundestag. New elections shall be held no earlier than 46 and no later than 48 months after the beginning of the electoral term. In the event of dissolution of the Bundestag, new elections shall be held within 60 days.
(2) The Bundestag shall meet no later than the thirtieth day after the election.

The very first federal election in 1949 took place on 14 August 1949, in the middle of summer after "probably the toughest election campaign". This was followed by five election dates at the end of September from 1953 to 1969. This allowed all citizens to participate in election campaign events in mild weather and daylight after the holiday season and harvest, before the start of military service, autumn semesters, etc. in October. After early elections in 1972 and 1983, the election dates were successively pushed back towards the beginning of October, taking advantage of the two-month leeway. From 1998 up to and including 2021, the Bundestag was elected seven times at the end of September, including the early election in 2005.

=== Election subject ===
Proportional representation in the Bundestag election

Only members of the Bundestag are elected. There are two ways to obtain a Bundestag mandate:

First vote
The first is a direct mandate in one of the currently 299 constituencies. Any German over the age of 18 can run for election as a member of the Bundestag. These candidates are usually members of political parties, but non-party members can also be elected. The person receiving the most first-past-the-post votes in a constituency is elected as the directly elected candidate. This means that each constituency is represented in the Bundestag with one direct mandate.
Second vote
The second option is to enter parliament via the parties' state lists. The second vote determines the parties' share of seats in parliament; if a party receives at least 5% of the second votes nationwide or at least three direct mandates ( barrier clause ), exactly as many candidates are elected to the Bundestag as corresponds to the share of votes among all parties that have exceeded the aforementioned five percent hurdle or basic mandate clause. The members of parliament are made up of the party's elected direct candidates and, if this share has not yet been exhausted, some state list candidates. If a party wins more direct mandates than it is entitled to according to the percentage calculation, it can keep these as overhang mandates until the 20th legislative term; however, in this case it does not send any list candidates to parliament. However, since the amendment to the Federal Election Act in 2024, overhang mandates have been abolished: If a party wins more constituencies than it is entitled to based on second votes, it may now only send its highest-ranking constituency winners to the Bundestag. This procedure is called second-vote coverage and has been upheld by the Federal Constitutional Court. This change will apply for the first time in the election of the 21st Bundestag.

A direct candidate can also be registered on their party's state list in order to still enter parliament without winning a constituency. These thresholds are intended to prevent a fragmentation of parliament; however, national minority parties, currently only the South Schleswig Voters' Association (SSW ), are not affected.

The complicated system of determining seat allocation not through a nationwide list but through state lists, with the nationwide result rather than the state result being the decisive factor, led to the problem of a "negative voting weight". The Federal Constitutional Court had declared this effect unconstitutional and instructed the legislature to revise the regulation by June 30, 2011 at the latest, which, however, did not happen until 9 May 2013.

=== Electoral procedure ===
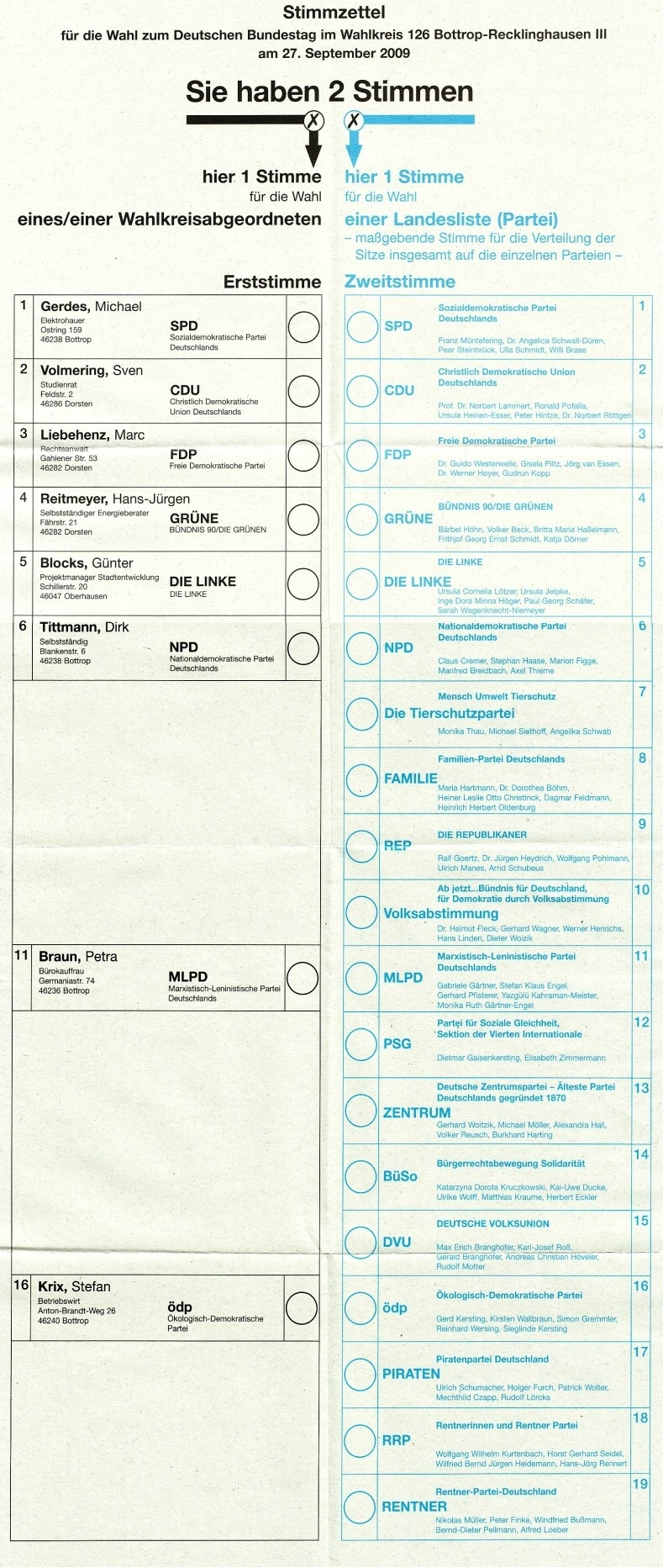
Ballot paper of the Bottrop – Recklinghausen III constituency for the election to the 17th Bundestag

For the election, all eligible voters receive a voting notification by mail, which states the location of their polling station and the time of the election. In Germany, there is no compulsory voting, as in some other countries. At the polling station, most voters only show their voting notification. Without a voting notification, or if there is doubt about their identity, the voter will be admitted if they can identify themselves with an official photo ID such as a German identity card, passport, driver's license or health insurance card or are personally known to a member of the electoral board. The election officials distribute the official election documents (ballot papers). On the ballot paper, the voter crosses the desired direct candidate (first vote) and the desired political party or association (second vote) in a voting booth, so that no one can see it. People who cannot read or are physically impaired may use an assistant. The voter then goes to their polling station with their documents, and an election official, after verifying their identity, checks the person's name on the electoral roll, authorizing the voter to place their folded ballot paper into the ballot box.

The electoral board may check the voting notification when the ballot paper is issued or only when it is placed in the ballot box.

In Germany, elections are usually held on Sundays between 8:00 a.m. and 6:00 p.m. (polling station opening and closing times). Polling stations are usually located in public buildings such as schools, sports halls, and town halls. Voters wishing to vote in a different constituency than the one indicated on their voting notification card can obtain a ballot paper from their local authority. Voters who do not wish to vote in person at the polling station (e.g., due to absence or illness) can cast their ballots by postal vote, which can be applied for after receiving their voting permit. Many municipalities allow electronic application for postal voting documents.

=== Special cases ===
In some electoral areas, special electoral districts or mobile electoral boards with "mobile ballot boxes" are established, for example, for correctional facilities, large retirement and nursing homes, hospitals, or monasteries. These special electoral districts, like all electoral districts, must be designated by the municipal authority (electoral office, electoral board). Generally, special electoral districts are created in cases where eligible voters are unable to visit a regular polling station for legal or physical reasons.

== After the election ==
=== Election evaluation ===
After the polling stations have closed, the votes are counted in each polling station (including special constituencies and postal voting districts) and the result is reported to the district returning officer, who determines the constituency result with the winner of the direct mandate and reports this to the state returning officer. The state returning officer then determines the state result and reports it to the federal returning officer, who consolidates the state results, announces the winners of the direct mandates in the 299 constituencies and the distribution of the mandates among the parties. Up to and including 1983, the D'Hondt seat allocation procedure was used. This procedure, which favours large parties and – in the case of internal party distribution among the federal states – large state lists, was replaced by the neutral Hare/Niemeyer procedure. Since the 2009 federal election, this has been replaced by the equally neutral Sainte-Laguë/Schepers procedure, which eliminates some possible paradoxes of the Hare/Niemeyer procedure.

=== Coalition negotiations and government formation ===
If a party cannot secure an absolute majority in the Bundestag on its own, it must either form a coalition or risk a minority government if it wishes to participate in the government. In the negotiations preceding the formation of either option, the substantive goals of government cooperation and the personnel composition of the federal government are determined in a coalition agreement. Typically, the Federal Chancellor is elected by secret ballot only after a coalition agreement has been concluded. The Vice-Chancellor of Germany usually comes from one of the smaller coalition parties.

== Cost ==
The federal government reimburses the states for their municipalities, in accordance with Section 50 of the Federal Elections Act (BWahlG), the costs of mailing the voting notification cards and postal voting documents, as well as refreshment allowances for the approximately 630,000 volunteers, amounting to €25 each ( Section 10, Paragraph 2 of the Federal Election Ordinance). In addition, there is a flat rate of up to €0.70 per eligible voter for the municipalities' other costs—such as renting, setting up, and cleaning polling stations—as well as the costs of producing ballot templates, which are reimbursed to the blind associations. The reimbursement of costs for the 2005 federal election thus totalled almost €63 million.

Individual candidates receive campaign reimbursement of €2.80 per vote, provided they receive at least 10% of the valid first votes in the constituency (Section 49b of the Federal Elections Act). Parties do not receive reimbursement for campaign expenses, but they do receive partial state funding, which depends, among other things, on the second votes received in the federal election. Since the funds are capped, voter turnout plays virtually no role in the costs.

== Criticism of the electoral system ==
The evaluation of the electoral system is controversial in political science. The political scientist Dieter Nohlen is of the opinion that personalized proportional representation has proven successful because it achieves the desired objectives of representation, concentration, and participation. Criticism comes, on the one hand, from proponents of proportional representation, who describe deviations from exact proportional representation as questionable and therefore consider the representation function to be only partially fulfilled, and, on the other hand, from proponents of a winner-take-all system who complain that personalized proportional representation leads to fragmented party systems in which the formation of governments is usually not clearly evident from the election results.

Furthermore, the complexity of the electoral system is often criticized. Even if one accepts the interplay of representation and concentration as a compromise, it must be argued that the effects result less from the complex interplay of the first and second votes, but rather from other factors such as the five percent threshold. A simpler electoral system—e.g., a proportional representation system with an additional threshold—could fulfil the representation and concentration functions just as well, but is more understandable and does not deal with the problem of overhang mandates and negative vote weight.

== Results ==
| Election | Voter turnout | CDU / CSU | SPD | FDP | Green | Linke/PDS | AfD | DP | GB/ BHE | Other |
|---|---|---|---|---|---|---|---|---|---|---|
| 1949 | 78.5 | 31.0 (25.2/5.8) | 29.2 | 11.9 | — | — | — | 4.0 | — | KPD 5.7; BP 4.2; Z 3.1; WAV 2.9; DKP-DRP 1.8; SSW 0.3; independent candidates 4.8 |
| 1953 | 86.0 | 45.2 (36.4/8.8) | 28.8 | 9.5 | — | — | — | 3.3 | 5.9 | KPD 2.2; BP 1.7; GVP 1.2; DRP 1.1; Z 0.8 |
| 1957 | 87.8 | 50.2 (39.7/10.5) | 31.8 | 7.7 | — | — | — | 3.4 | 4.6 | DRP 1.0 |
| 1961 | 87.7 | 45.3 (35.8/9.6) | 36.2 | 12.8 | — | — | — | GDP 2.8 | | DFU 1.9 |
| 1965 | 86.8 | 47.6 (38.0/9.6) | 39.3 | 9.5 | — | — | — | — | ^{a} | NPD 2.0; DFU 1.3 |
| 1969 | 86.7 | 46.1 (36.6/9.5) | 42.7 | 5.8 | — | — | — | — | GPD 0.1 | NPD 4.3 |
| 1972 | 91.1 | 44.9 (35.2/9.7) | 45.8 | 8.4 | — | — | — | — | — | |
| 1976 | 90.7 | 48.6 (38.0/10.6) | 42.6 | 7.9 | | — | — | — | — | |
| 1980 | 88.6 | 44.5 (34.2/10.3) | 42.9 | 10.6 | 1.5 | — | — | — | — | |
| 1983 | 89.1 | 48.8 (38.2/10.6) | 38.2 | 7.0 | 5.6 | — | — | — | — | |
| 1987 | 84.3 | 44.3 (34.5/9.8) | 37.0 | 9.1 | 8.3 | — | — | — | — | |
| 1990 | 77.8 | 43.8 (36.7/7.1) | 33.5 | 11.0 | 5.1 | 2.4 | — | — | — | REP 2.1 |
| 1994 | 79.0 | 41.4 (34.2/7.3) | 36.4 | 6.9 | 7.3 | 4.4 | — | — | — | REP 1.9 |
| 1998 | 82.2 | 35.1 (28.4/6.7) | 40.9 | 6.2 | 6.7 | 5.1 | — | — | — | REP 1.8; DVU 1.2 |
| 2002 | 79.1 | 38.5 (29.5/9.0) | 38.5 | 7.4 | 8.6 | 4,0 | — | — | — | |
| 2005 | 77.7 | 35.2 (27.8/7.4) | 34.2 | 9.8 | 8.1 | 8.7 | — | — | — | NPD 1.6 |
| 2009 | 70.9 | 33.8 (27.3/6.5) | 23.0 | 14.6 | 10.7 | 11.9 | — | — | — | Pirates 2.0; NPD 1.5 |
| 2013 | 71.5 | 41.5 (34.1/7.4) | 25.7 | 4.8 | 8.4 | 8.6 | 4.7 | — | — | Pirates 2.2; NPD 1.3 |
| 2017 | 76.2 | 32.9 (26.8/6.2) | 20.5 | 10.7 | 8.9 | 9.2 | 12.6 | — | — | |
| 2021 | 76.6 | 24.1 (19.0/5.2) | 25.7 | 11.5 | 14.8 | 4.9 | 10.3 | — | — | FW 2.4; Animal welfare p. 1.5; Base 1.4; SSW 0.1 |
| 2025 | 82.5 | 28.5 (22.6/6.0) | 16.4 | 4.3 | 11.6 | 8.8 | 20.8 | — | — | BSW 4.97 ; FW 1.5; SSW 0.2 |

The number of seats up to 1987 does not include the West Berlin members of the Bundestag, who were not entitled to vote except on procedural motions. They only gained their full voting rights during the 11th legislative period on 8 June 1990.

== Legal changes in the past ==
=== Election date ===
The original election date was:

(1) The Bundestag shall be elected for a term of four years. Its term shall end four years after its first convocation or upon its dissolution. New elections shall be held in the last quarter of the term, or in the event of dissolution, no later than sixty days after the first convocation.
(2) The Bundestag shall meet no later than the thirtieth day after the election, but not before the end of the term of office of the last Bundestag.

The 33rd Act amending the Basic Law ( Articles 29 and 39 GG) of 23 August 1976 (Federal Law Gazette I p. 2381), which was first applied to the 1980 West German federal election, reworded the relevant paragraphs:

(1) The Bundestag shall be elected for a term of four years. Its electoral term shall end with the convening of a new Bundestag. New elections shall be held no earlier than 45 and no later than 47 months after the beginning of the electoral term. In the event of dissolution of the Bundestag, new elections shall be held within 60 days.
(2) The Bundestag shall meet no later than the thirtieth day after the election.

The last amendment was made with the Act Amending the Basic Law ( Article 39 GG) of 16 July 1998 (Federal Law Gazette I p. 1822), which was applied for the first time in the 2002 German federal election.

=== Parliamentary enlargements during current legislative periods ===
==== 1952 ====
The first expansion of parliament, which had no effect on the number of voting members of the Bundestag, took place on February 1, 1952. By increasing the number of West Berlin members of the Bundestag from eight to 19, the total number of Bundestag seats increased from 410 to 421 – the number of voting parliamentarians remained unchanged at 402.

==== 1957 ====
Due to the accession of Saarland, ten additional members, previously appointed by the Landtag of Saarland, were added on 4 January 1957 This increased the number of fully voting members of the Bundestag from 487 to 497. Initially, three of these ten members each belonged to the CDU and the DPS, and two each to the SPD and the CVP.

==== 1990 I ====
As a result of the reunification process, the 22 West Berlin members of the Bundestag (CDU 11, SPD 7, FDP 2, AL 2) were granted full voting rights from 8 June 1990, increasing the number of voting members of the Bundestag from 497 to 519.

==== 1990 II ====
On 3 October 1990, 144 parliamentarians from the former DDR entered the Bundestag; they had previously been appointed by the GDR's Volkskammer. The number of (fully voting) members of the Bundestag thus increased from 519 to 663. Of the 144 members appointed by the People's Chamber, 63 belonged to the CDU, eight to the DSU, 33 to the SPD, nine to the FDP, 24 to the PDS, and seven to Alliance 90/The Greens (East) (including the East German Green Party).

=== Changes in electoral law brought about by court decisions ===
After the Federal Constitutional Court had declared significant parts of the Federal Election Act (more precisely: the mechanism for allocating seats or converting votes into seats in Section 6 of the Federal Election Act) unconstitutional, first on 3 July 2008 and – after an initial amendment by the coalition government of CDU/CSU and FDP in 2011 – again on 25 July 2012, the parliamentary groups of the CDU /CSU, SPD, FDP and Greens agreed in October 2012 on an amendment to the Federal Election Act, which includes the introduction of compensatory mandates. Depending on the number of overhang mandates and varying levels of voter turnout at the state level, the total number of seats can increase considerably. The amendment came into force on 9 May 2013. The right to vote for Germans living abroad was also revised on 3 May 2012, after the Federal Constitutional Court declared the regulation in force since 2008 unconstitutional.

== See also ==
- List of Bundestag constituencies
- Elections in Germany

== Literature ==
- Wissenschaftliche Dienste des Bundestages: (PDF; 15 kB)
- Wissenschaftliche Dienste des Bundestages: (PDF; 15 kB)
