= First vote =

Element of the German electoral system

In Germany, the first vote (German: Erststimme) is used to elect a direct candidate in a constituency. In the federal states, the first vote is sometimes called the constituency vote or direct vote.

== The first vote in the federal election ==
Explanatory video: First and second votes in the federal election

In German federal elections each political party may nominate one candidate within a constituency. In addition, non-party candidates are possible. The candidate with the most first votes in his constituency receives a so-called direct mandate and becomes a member of the Bundestag; all other candidates go home empty-handed. In this way, 299 members of parliament, one for each constituency, enter the Bundestag. They thus represent approximately half of all members of the Bundestag.

Although the first vote is not considered to be quite as influential as the second vote, it does have important functions in the election. It is an opportunity for individuals to enter the German Bundestag without being nominated by a party on a state list (example: Hans-Christian Ströbele in the 2002 German federal election). The first vote also guarantees the representation of all regions in parliament, because the constituencies are divided in such a way that each constituency has approximately the same number of people entitled to vote. In a non-personalized proportional representation system without constituencies, this is not automatically the case.

The validity of the first vote remains unaffected by a possible invalidity of the second vote (Section 39, Paragraph 1 of the Federal Election Law).

In contrast to the second vote, the first vote does not directly determine the strength of a parliamentary group, but simply swaps a candidate from the state list for the current constituency candidate. If more candidates from a party are elected to parliament through the first vote than the party is entitled to in percentage terms through the second votes, additional mandates are created, the overhang seats. Leveling seats have been in place since 2013 to ensure a proportional distribution of seats.

== State elections ==
In state elections in Hamburg, Hesse, Rhineland-Palatinate and Thuringia, the first vote is called a constituency vote (Wahlkreisstimme) and in Saxony it is called a direct vote (Direktstimme). Except in Bavaria, the significance of the first vote is the same as in federal elections. However, in Hamburg, three to five seats are distributed in each constituency using proportional representation. In the Bavarian state election system, the first votes also count towards the proportional distribution of seats.

In all state elections with first vote, there are compensatory mandates for overhang mandates. In several states, however, the compensation is capped, so that proportional distortions can arise.

== See also ==
- Electoral system of Germany
