= 2009 German federal election =

- 27 September 2009

All 622 seats in the Bundestag, including 24 overhang seats 312 seats needed for a majority
- Registered: 62,168,489 (▲0.5%)
- Turnout: 70.8% (▼6.9 pp)
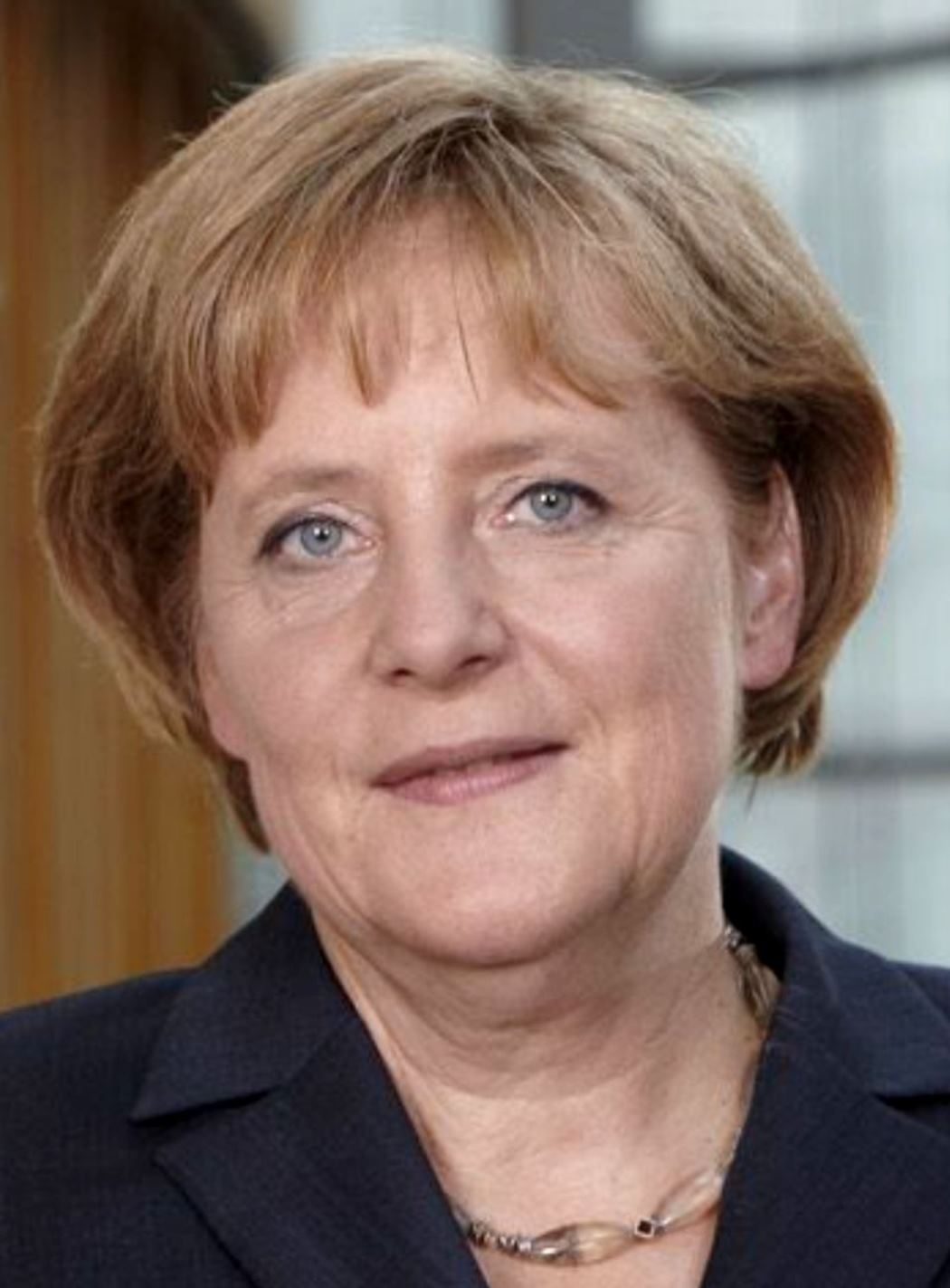

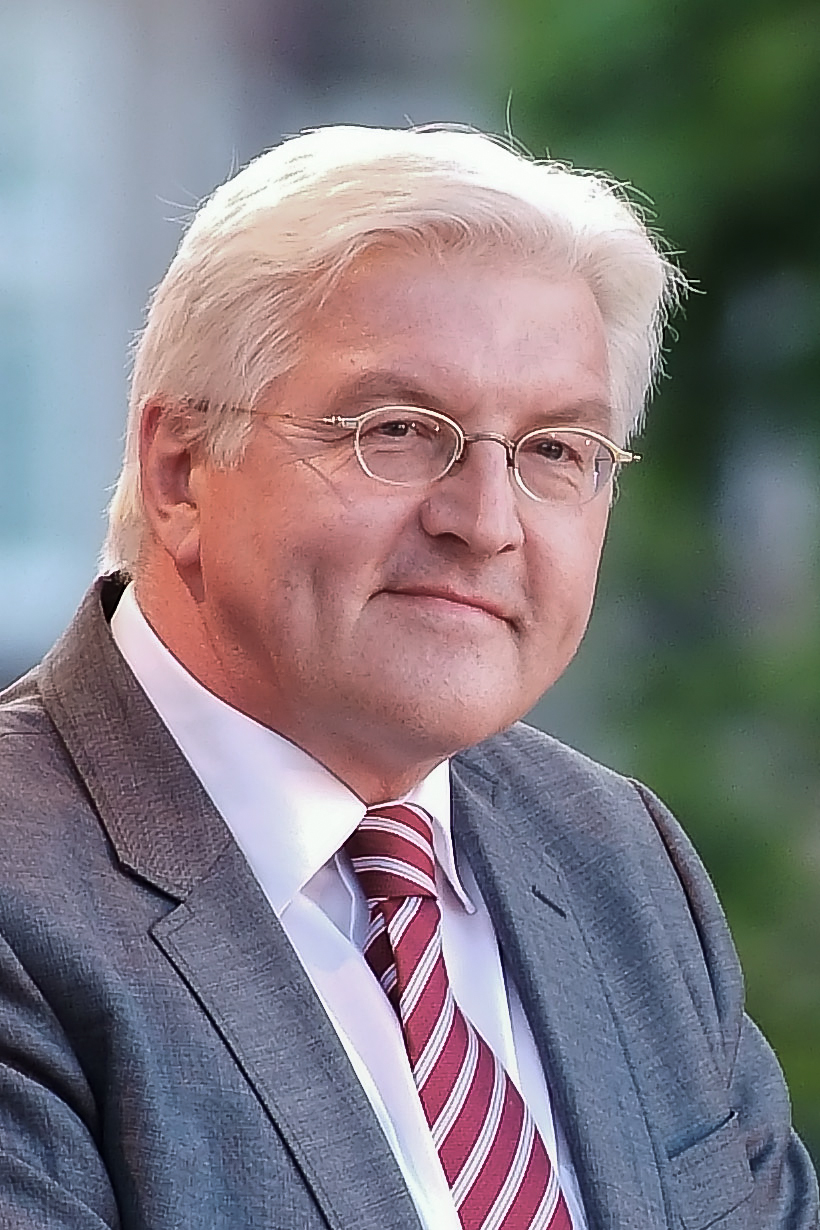

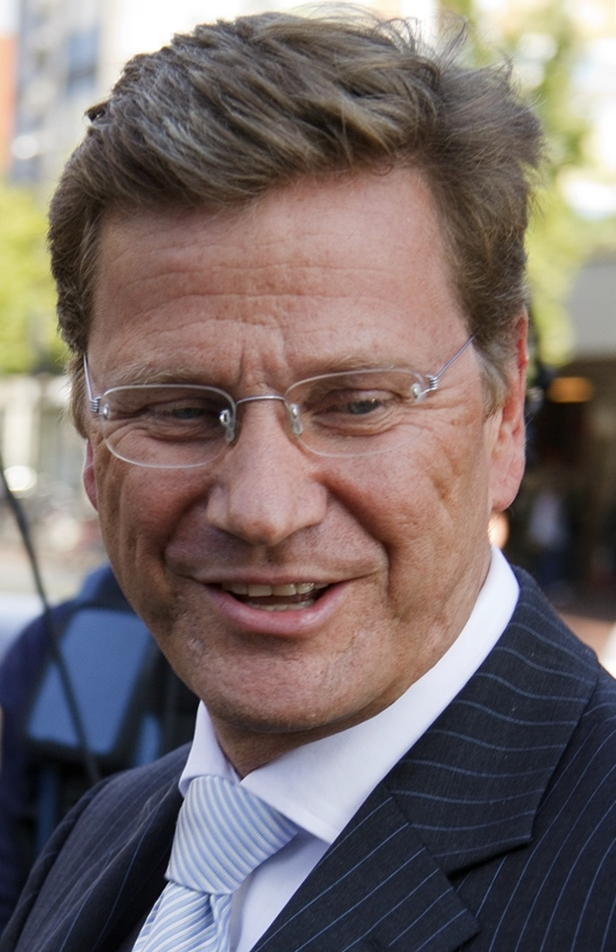

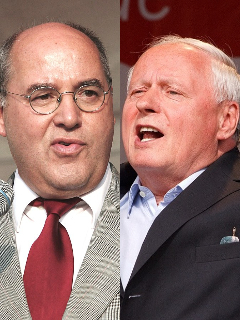

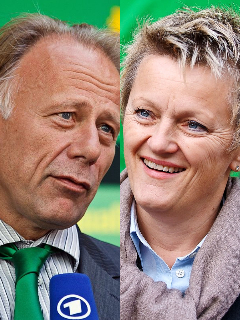
	First party	Second party	Third party
Candidate	Angela Merkel	Frank-Walter Steinmeier	Guido Westerwelle
Party	CDU/CSU	SPD	FDP
Last election	35.2%, 226 seats	34.2%, 222 seats	9.8%, 61 seats
Seats won	239	146	93
Seat change	▲13	▼76	▲32
Popular vote	14,658,515	9,990,488	6,316,080
Percentage	33.8%	23.0%	14.6%
Swing	▼1.4 pp	▼11.2 pp	▲4.8 pp
	Fourth party	Fifth party
Candidate	Gregor Gysi & Oskar Lafontaine	Jürgen Trittin & Renate Künast
Party	Left	Greens
Last election	8.7%, 54 seats	8.1%, 51 seats
Seats won	76	68
Seat change	▲22	▲17
Popular vote	5,155,933	4,643,272
Percentage	11.9%	10.7%
Swing	▲3.2 pp	▲2.6 pp
- Results of the election. The main map shows constituency winners, and results for the proportional list seats are shown in the bottom left.
Government before election
First Merkel cabinet
CDU/CSU–SPD
Government after election
Second Merkel cabinet
CDU/CSU-FDP

A federal election was held in Germany on 27 September 2009 to elect the members of the 17th Bundestag.

The Christian Democratic Union (CDU), its Bavarian sister party, the Christian Social Union (CSU), and the Free Democratic Party (FDP) won the election, and the three parties formed a new centre-right government with Angela Merkel as chancellor. While CDU/CSU's share of votes decreased slightly, it was more than compensated by the gains of their "desired coalition partner", the liberal FDP, that won the strongest result in its history.

CDU and CSU's former partner in the "Grand coalition", the Social Democratic Party (SPD) led by Frank-Walter Steinmeier, conceded defeat after dropping by more than 11 percentage points, receiving its hitherto worst result since the end of the Second World War (only undercut in 2017 and 2025). At 70.8 percent, the voter turnout was the lowest in a German federal election since 1949.

== Electoral system ==
According to Article 38 of the Basic Law for the Federal Republic of Germany, members of the Bundestag shall be elected in general, direct, free, equal, and secret elections; everyone over the age of eighteen is entitled to vote.

In 2008, some modifications to the electoral system were required under an order of the Federal Constitutional Court of Germany. The court had found a provision in the Federal Election Law by which it was possible for a party to experience a negative vote weight, namely losing seats due to more votes, violated the constitutional guarantee of the electoral system being equal and direct. The court allowed three years for these changes, so the 2009 German federal election was not affected. The changes were due by 30 June 2011 but appropriate legislation was not completed by that deadline. A new electoral law was enacted in late 2011 but was declared unconstitutional once again by the Federal Constitutional Court upon lawsuits from the opposition parties and a group of some 4,000 private citizens.

Four of the five factions in the Bundestag agreed on an electoral reform whereby the number of seats in the Bundestag will be increased as much as necessary to ensure that any overhang seats are compensated through apportioned leveling seats, to ensure full proportionality according to the political party's share of party votes at the national level. The Bundestag approved and enacted the new electoral reform in February 2013.

The Bundestag is elected using mixed-member proportional representation, meaning that each voter has two votes, a first vote for the election of a constituency candidate by first-past-the-post and a second vote for the election of a state list. The Sainte-Laguë/Schepers method is used to convert the votes into seats, in a two-stage process with each stage involving two calculations. First, the number of seats to be allocated to each state is calculated, based on the proportion of the German population living there. Then the seats in each state are allocated to the party lists in that state, based on the proportion of second votes each party received.

In the distribution of seats among state lists, only parties that have obtained at least five percent of the valid second votes cast in the electoral area or have won a seat in at least three constituencies are taken into consideration. The minimum number of seats for each party at federal level is then determined. This is done by calculating, for each party state list, the number of constituency seats it won on the basis of the first votes, as well as the number of seats to which it is entitled on the basis of the second votes. The higher of these two figures is the party's minimum number of seats in that state. Adding together the minimum number of seats to which the party is entitled in all of the states produces a total representing its guaranteed minimum number of seats in the country as a whole.

In order to ensure that each party receives its guaranteed minimum number of seats when the seats are allocated using the Sainte-Laguë/Schepers method, it may become necessary to increase the number of seats in the Bundestag. Then it must be ensured that the seats are distributed to the parties in line with their national share of the second votes. Additional overhang seats, or balance seats, are created to ensure that the distribution of the seats reflects the parties' share of the second votes and that no party receives fewer than its guaranteed minimum number of seats. Balance seats are also necessary to ensure that each party requires roughly the same number of second votes per seat. Once the number of seats which each party is entitled to receive across the country has been determined, the seats are allocated to the parties' individual state lists. Each state list must receive at least as many seats as the number of constituencies which the party won in the state in question.

== Campaign ==
Since the 2005 election, Chancellor Angela Merkel (CDU) had governed in a grand coalition with the SPD. However, it was her stated goal to win a majority for CDU/CSU and FDP (the CDU/CSU's traditional coalition partner) in 2009.

Foreign minister and Vice-Chancellor Frank-Walter Steinmeier (SPD) was formally nominated as his party's chancellor-candidate at a convention on 18 October 2008. He aimed to form a government in which the SPD was the strongest party, but which also excluded the left-socialist party The Left.

The election campaign was considered exceptionally boring, which may be attributable to a perceived lack of charisma on the part of the leaders of the CDU and SPD. Another reason pointed to for the sedate campaign is that the CDU and SPD both defended the record of their grand coalition, and facing the possibility of having to continue the grand coalition in a friendly manner. Merkel was content with the low-key campaign style, which was largely seen as benefiting her party because of her high approval ratings.

CDU candidate Vera Lengsfeld released a campaign poster featuring herself and Merkel in a way that emphasised their cleavage. The poster bore the slogan "We have more to offer" (German: "Wir haben mehr zu bieten").

On 23 September 2009, four days before the federal elections, German police raided the Berlin headquarters of the National Democratic Party of Germany NPD to investigate claims that letters sent from the NPD to politicians from immigrant backgrounds incited racial hatred. The NPD leader in Berlin defended the letters saying that "As part of a democracy, we're entitled to say if something doesn't suit us in this country."

The federal election was the final and most important election in what is called a Superwahljahr (super election year) in Germany. In addition to the election of a new Bundestag, also scheduled for 2009 were the election to the European Parliament on 7 June, seven local elections on the same day, five state elections and an additional local election in August and September and the election of the president of Germany by the Federal Assembly on 23 May.

== Opinion polls ==
Average trend line of poll results from 18 September 2005 to 27 September 2009 with each line corresponding to a political party. CDU/CSU SPD FDP LINKE GRÜNE

The CDU/CSU and FDP, with an average vote share of around 50% in pre-election polling during the weeks before the election, were clearly ahead of the other traditional coalition partners in Germany, SPD and the Greens.

Institute	Date	CDU/CSU	SPD	Greens	FDP	The Left	Others
Forschungsgruppe Wahlen	18 Sept	36%	25%	10%	13%	11%	5%
Forsa	16 Sept	37%	24%	11%	12%	10%	6%
Allensbach	16 Sept	36%	22.5%	12%	12.5%	12%	6%
Forschungsgruppe Wahlen	11 Sept	36%	23%	11%	14%	11%	5%
Infratest dimap	10 Sept	35%	23%	12%	14%	12%	4%
Allensbach	9 Sept	35%	22.5%	13%	13%	11.5%	5%
Forschungsgruppe Wahlen	4 Sept	37%	23%	11%	15%	10%	4%
Emnid	3 Sept	34%	26%	11%	14%	11%	4%
INFO GmbH	2 Sept	35%	23%	12%	14%	11%	4%
Allensbach	1 Sept	35.5%	23%	13.5%	14%	9.5%	4.5%
GMS	24 Aug	37%	23%	13%	13%	9%	5%

== Results ==
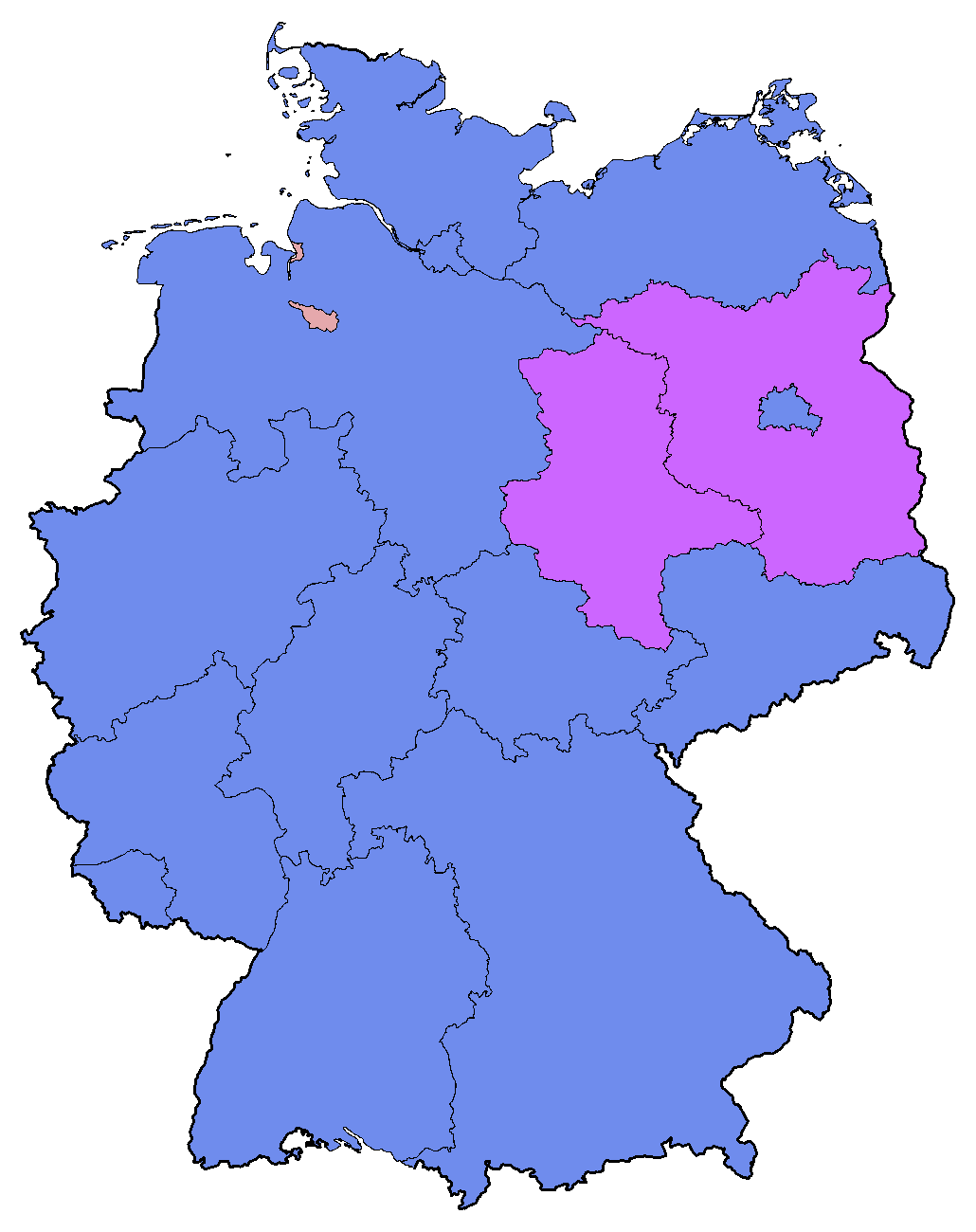
Party list election results by state: blue denotes states where CDU/CSU had the plurality of votes; purple denotes states where Die Linke had the plurality of votes; and pink denotes states where the SPD had the plurality of votes

Party list results by constituency

The Christian Democratic Union (CDU), the Christian Social Union of Bavaria (CSU), and the Free Democratic Party (FDP) were able to form a centre-right government, with Angela Merkel of the CDU continuing as the chancellor and the leader of the FDP, Guido Westerwelle, becoming foreign minister and vice-chancellor.

The CDU/CSU received a slightly lower proportion than in the previous election, with the Bavarian CSU receiving its lowest vote share in decades. Overall, the CDU/CSU had their worst vote share in 60 years. In contrast, their preferred coalition partner, the liberal FDP, gained nearly 5% points to give it 14.6% of the vote, the best result of its history. The big loser of the election was the SPD, which received its worst result ever in a federal election, receiving only 23% of the total party vote and suffering the biggest percentage loss of any party in German federal election history in 60 years. The two other parties represented in the Bundestag, the Left and the Greens, both made large gains and received the highest vote share of their respective histories. For the first time, The Left won constituency seats outside its traditional stronghold of East Berlin. As a result of the losses by the SPD and the gains by the FDP, the alliance of the CDU/CSU and FDP received an outright majority of seats, ensuring that Angela Merkel would continue as chancellor.

Had the CDU/CSU and FDP failed to win a majority of seats, possible alternative coalitions may have included a continuation of the grand coalition of CDU/CSU and SPD. A traffic light coalition (SPD–FDP–Greens) was specifically ruled out by FDP leader Guido Westerwelle.

Party	Party-list			Constituency			Total seats	+/–
Party	Votes	%	Seats	Votes	%	Seats	Total seats	+/–
Christian Democratic Union	11,828,277	27.27	21	13,856,674	32.04	173	194	+14
Social Democratic Party	9,990,488	23.03	82	12,079,758	27.93	64	146	−76
Free Democratic Party	6,316,080	14.56	93	4,076,496	9.43	0	93	+32
The Left	5,155,933	11.89	60	4,791,124	11.08	16	76	+22
Alliance 90/The Greens	4,643,272	10.71	67	3,977,125	9.20	1	68	+17
Christian Social Union	2,830,238	6.53	0	3,191,000	7.38	45	45	−1
Pirate Party Germany	847,870	1.95	0	46,770	0.11	0	0	New
National Democratic Party	635,525	1.47	0	768,442	1.78	0	0	0
Human Environment Animal Protection Party	230,872	0.53	0	16,887	0.04	0	0	0
The Republicans	193,396	0.45	0	30,061	0.07	0	0	0
Ecological Democratic Party	132,249	0.30	0	105,653	0.24	0	0	0
Family Party	120,718	0.28	0	17,848	0.04	0	0	0
Alliance 21/RRP	100,605	0.23	0	37,946	0.09	0	0	New
Pensioner Party Germany	56,399	0.13	0				0	New
Bavaria Party	48,311	0.11	0	32,324	0.07	0	0	0
German People's Union	45,752	0.11	0				0	0
Party of Bible-abiding Christians	40,370	0.09	0	12,052	0.03	0	0	0
Bürgerrechtsbewegung Solidarität	38,706	0.09	0	34,894	0.08	0	0	0
The Violets	31,957	0.07	0	5,794	0.01	0	0	0
Marxist–Leninist Party	29,261	0.07	0	17,512	0.04	0	0	0
Alliance for Germany	23,015	0.05	0	2,550	0.01	0	0	0
Free Voters	11,243	0.03	0				0	New
Christian Centre	6,826	0.02	0				0	0
Centre Party	6,087	0.01	0	369	0.00	0	0	0
Party for Social Equality	2,957	0.01	0				0	0
Alliance of the Centre	2,889	0.01	0	396	0.00	0	0	New
German Communist Party	1,894	0.00	0	929	0.00	0	0	0
Free Union				6,121	0.01	0	0	New
Independents and voter groups				139,275	0.32	0	0	0
Total	43,371,190	100.00	323	43,248,000	100.00	299	622	+8
Valid votes	43,371,190	98.56		43,248,000	98.28			
Invalid/blank votes	634,385	1.44		757,575	1.72			
Total votes	44,005,575	100.00		44,005,575	100.00			
Registered voters/turnout	62,168,489	70.78		62,168,489	70.78			
Source: Bundeswahlleiter

Popular vote
CDU/CSU	33.80%
SPD	23.03%
FDP	14.56%
DIE LINKE	11.89%
GRÜNE	10.71%
PIRATEN	1.95%
Other	4.06%

Bundestag seats
CDU/CSU	38.42%
SPD	23.47%
FDP	14.95%
DIE LINKE	12.22%
GRÜNE	10.93%

=== Results by state ===
Second Vote (Zweitstimme, or votes for party list)

State results in %	CDU/CSU	SPD	FDP	LINKE	GRÜNE	all others
Baden-Württemberg	34.5	19.3	18.8	7.2	13.9	6.3
Bavaria	42.6	16.8	14.7	6.5	10.8	8.6
Berlin	22.8	20.2	11.5	20.2	17.4	7.9
Brandenburg	23.6	25.1	9.3	28.5	6.1	7.4
Bremen	23.9	30.3	10.6	14.2	15.4	5.6
Hamburg	27.9	27.4	13.2	11.2	15.6	4.7
Hesse	32.2	25.6	16.6	8.5	12.0	5.1
Mecklenburg-Vorpommern	33.2	16.6	9.8	29.0	5.5	5.9
Lower Saxony	33.2	29.3	13.3	8.6	10.7	4.9
North Rhine-Westphalia	33.1	28.5	14.9	8.4	10.1	5.0
Rhineland-Palatinate	35.0	23.8	16.6	9.4	9.7	5.5
Saarland	30.7	24.7	11.9	21.2	6.8	4.7
Saxony	35.6	14.6	13.3	24.5	6.7	5.3
Saxony-Anhalt	30.1	16.9	10.3	32.4	5.1	5.2
Schleswig-Holstein	32.2	26.8	16.3	7.9	12.7	4.1
Thuringia	31.2	17.6	9.8	28.8	6.0	6.6

CDU-CSU vote

SPD vote

FDP vote

Linke vote

Grüne vote

PIRATEN vote

==== Constituency seats ====
State	Total seats	Seats won				
State	Total seats	CDU	SPD	CSU	Linke	Grüne
Baden-Württemberg	38	37	1			
Bavaria	45			45		
Berlin	12	5	2		4	1
Brandenburg	10	1	5		4	
Bremen	2		2			
Hamburg	6	3	3			
Hesse	21	15	6			
Lower Saxony	30	16	14			
Mecklenburg-Vorpommern	7	6			1	
North Rhine-Westphalia	64	37	27			
Rhineland-Palatinate	15	13	2			
Saarland	4	4				
Saxony	16	16				
Saxony-Anhalt	9	4			5	
Schleswig-Holstein	11	9	2			
Thuringia	9	7			2	
Total	299	173	64	45	16	1

==== List seats ====
State	Total seats	Seats won				
State	Total seats	FDP	SPD	Grüne	Linke	CDU
Baden-Württemberg	46	15	14	11	6	
Bavaria	46	14	16	10	6	
Berlin	11	3	3	3	1	1
Brandenburg	9	2		1	2	4
Bremen	4	1		1	1	1
Hamburg	7	2	1	2	1	1
Hesse	24	8	6	6	4	
Lower Saxony	32	9	5	7	6	5
Mecklenburg-Vorpommern	7	1	2	1	3	
North Rhine-Westphalia	65	20	12	14	11	8
Rhineland-Palatinate	17	5	6	3	3	
Saarland	6	1	2	1	2	
Saxony	19	4	5	2	8	
Saxony-Anhalt	8	2	3	1	1	1
Schleswig-Holstein	13	4	4	3	2	
Thuringia	9	2	3	1	3	
Total	323	93	82	67	60	21
