= Bavarian state election system =

Landtag election systems in Bavaria

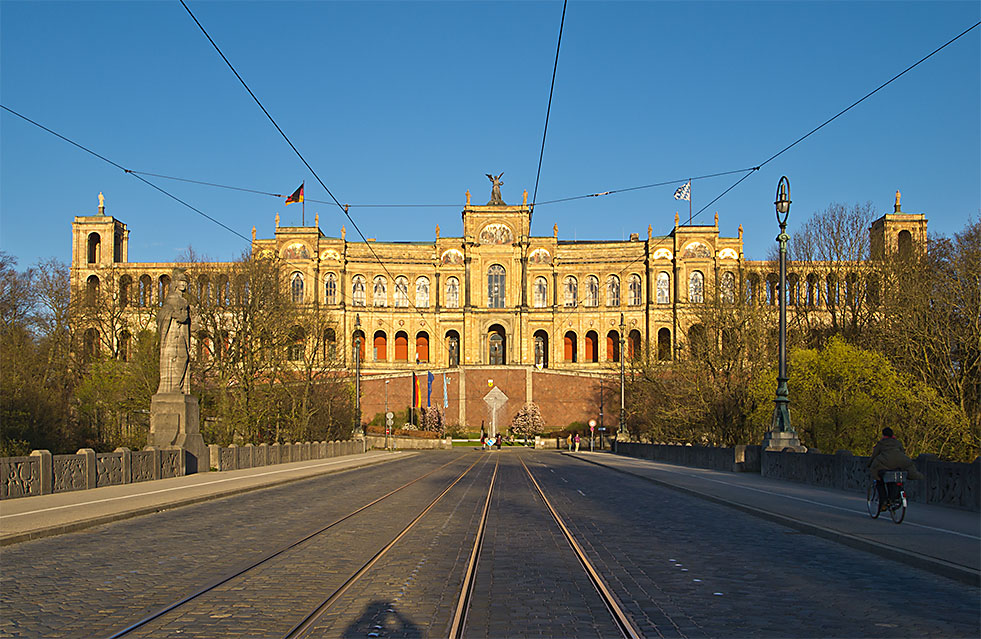
The Maximilianeum in Munich is home to the Landtag of Bavaria.

The Bavarian state election system (German: Bayerisches Landtagswahlsystem) is used to determine the currently at least 180 seats in the Landtag of Bavaria. The Bavarian Constitution (Article 14, Paragraph 1 of the Constitution) and the Bavarian State Election Law (LWG) provide for a so-called "improved proportional representation system." Unlike in federal elections, first and second votes are equally important for the proportional distribution of seats among the parties.

== Legal basis ==
Compared to other federal states and the electoral law of the Bundestag, the Bavarian Constitution stipulates some details very specifically. Changing the Bavarian state electoral system therefore involves greater hurdles than, for example, the electoral law of the Bundestag, namely a constitutionally amending majority in the Bavarian state parliament and a referendum (see Art. 75 BV).

=== Electoral principles ===
As prescribed in Article 28 of the Basic Law (GG) for all German states, the principles of democratic elections also apply in Bavaria. The Bavarian Constitution stipulates: "Representatives shall be elected in general, equal, direct, and secret elections according to an improved proportional representation system by all eligible citizens in constituencies and voting districts." (Article 14, Paragraph 1 of the BV). The criterion of free elections is understood to be a necessary consequence of the other four principles.

For further information on the principles of electoral law, see the articleBundestagswahlrecht.

=== Right to vote ===
==== Active right to vote ====
All Germans who have reached the age of 18 (of majority) and have been resident in Bavaria for at least three months are entitled to vote in state parliament elections, referendums, and popular initiatives . Furthermore, their right to vote must not have been revoked, for example, by a court ruling.

==== Passive right to vote ====
Any eligible voter is eligible to stand for election unless barred by a court ruling. According to Article 23 of the State Election Law, nominations may only be submitted by political parties and other organized voter groups.

== Electoral system ==
The seven Bavarian constituencies

Since 2003, at least 180 seats in seven constituencies have been up for grabs in the Bavarian state elections.

The language used in Bavarian state election law differs from that used in federal election law and the electoral laws of other federal states:

- Each of the seven administrative districts is a constituency . At the constituency level, seats are allocated using proportional representation. Thus, there is no statewide proportional representation.
- A constituency is the unit within which a member of parliament is directly elected. It corresponds to what is referred to as a constituency in federal electoral law.

180 seats are distributed among the constituencies according to their share of the eligible voters (until May 2022: share of the German population). The constituencies are divided into voting districts. One candidate is directly elected in each constituency, the remaining seats are filled via constituency lists. According to Article 14 of the Constitution, the number of representatives elected in constituencies may not exceed the number of representatives elected via constituency lists by more than one. For example, if a constituency is allocated 19 seats, a maximum of 10 voting districts may be formed there. In practice, the maximum number is always used up. Since the reduction of the state parliament to 180 seats, there have always been 90 to 92 voting districts across the state.

=== Constituency lists ===
The constituency list must be drawn up by a member or representative assembly of the party or electoral group. The list must include all of its constituency candidates who have been elected by the member or representative assemblies in the respective constituencies. Each list must contain at least one constituency candidate. Only one constituency candidate can be nominated for each constituency. The nomination assembly may elect additional candidates at the constituency level. The list may contain a maximum of as many candidates as there are seats to be filled in the constituency. The nomination assembly may, but is not required to, determine the order of the candidates.

=== First vote ===
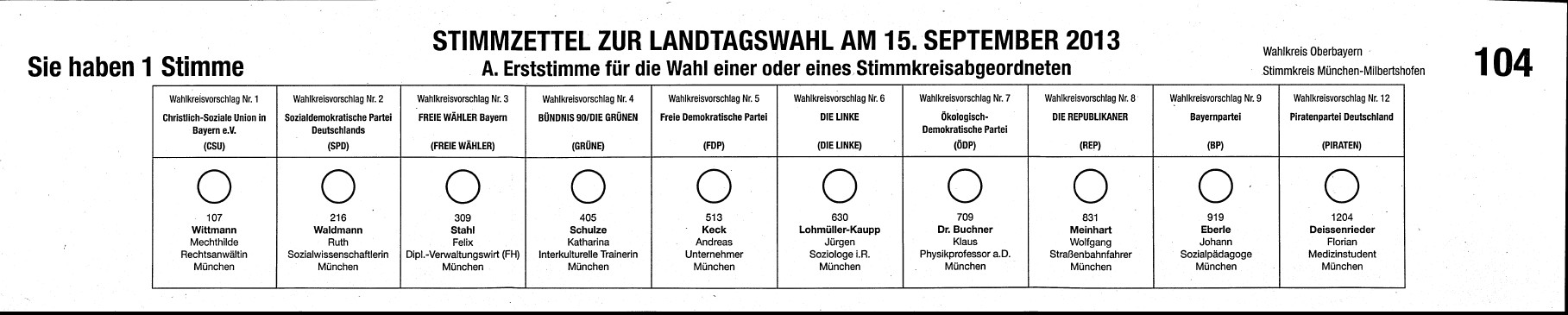
Ballot paper for the first vote with the direct candidates for the constituency. Here for the Munich-Milbertshofen constituency, in the Upper Bavaria constituency.

With their first vote, eligible voters can choose between the constituency candidates of the parties and voting groups running. If a party has not nominated a candidate for a constituency, they are not eligible for election with their first vote.

=== Second vote ===
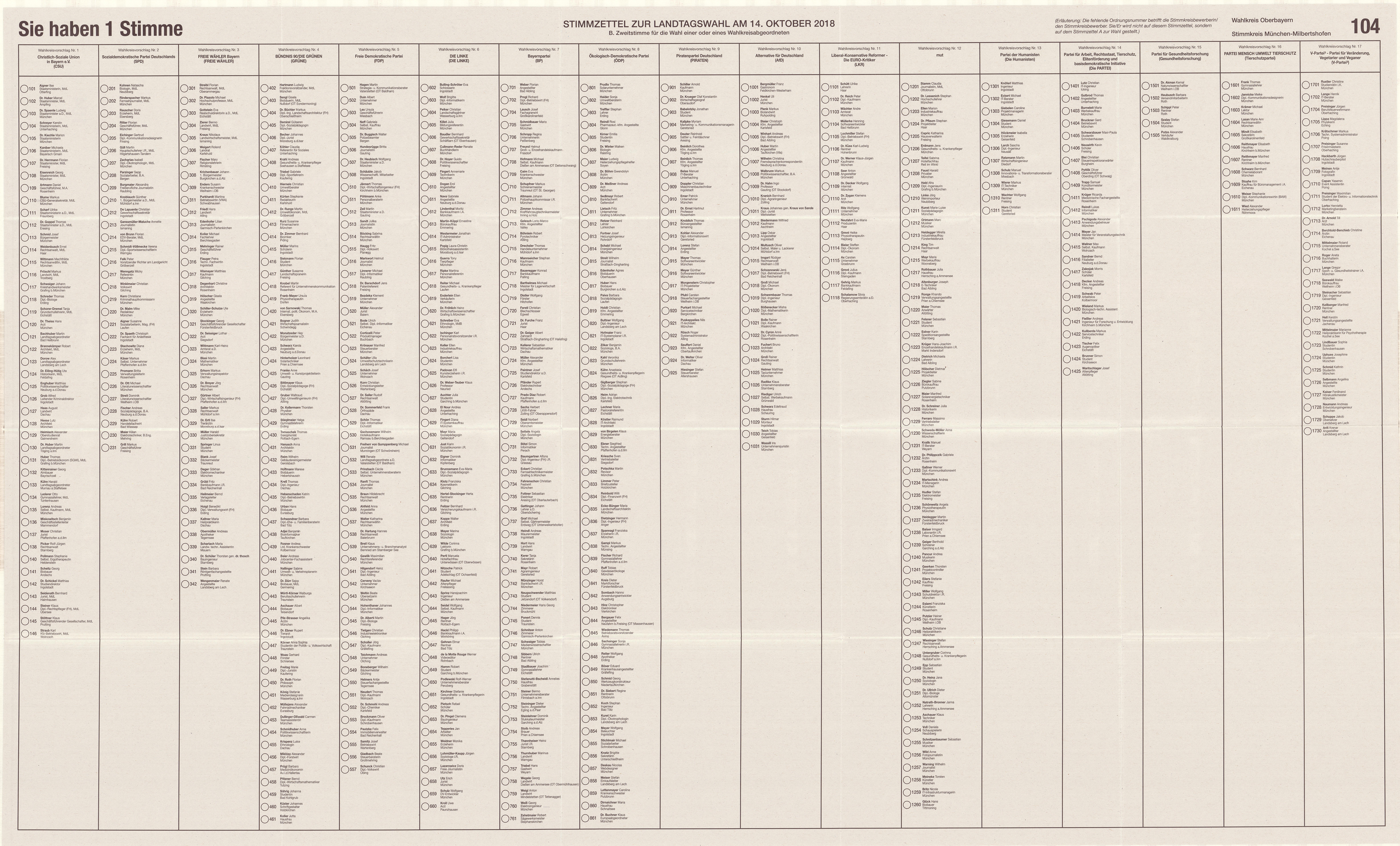
Ballot paper for the second vote with the eligible candidates from the 17 constituency lists. Here, in the Munich-Milbertshofen constituency, in the Upper Bavaria constituency.

With their second vote, voters choose a candidate from a constituency list. A vote for a candidate is also a vote for their party or voting group. Unlike under federal electoral law, voters also cast their second vote for a specific candidate and therefore have more influence. The ballot paper generally contains all candidates from all constituency lists. However, constituency candidates are not listed on the ballot paper for the constituency for which they are nominated. Unlike in federal elections, there are separate ballot papers for the first and second votes. If the party or voting group has not specified a order for the candidates, they are listed in alphabetical order. Candidates at the top of the list are therefore more likely to be elected and are therefore at an advantage.

=== Blocking clause ===
Until 1973, only parties and voting groups received seats that won at least 10 percent of the votes in at least one constituency. For example, in the 1962 Bavarian state election, the GDP did not receive 10% of the vote in any constituency and, with 5.1% of the vote, received no seats statewide (the same was true of the FDP in 1966), while the Bavaria Party, with a vote share of 4.8% nationwide, received eight seats, as it achieved 10.3% in Lower Bavaria. Since 1973, a statewide five percent hurdle has been enshrined in Article 14 of the Constitution. Since the Bavarian electoral system does not contain a regulation comparable to the basic mandate clause in the federal electoral law, this also means that winning constituency candidates may not receive a mandate.

=== Seat allocation ===
==== Constituency ====
The candidate with the most first votes in the constituency is elected.

If the party or voting group of the candidate with the most votes fails to clear the five percent hurdle, that candidate is not awarded the seat. Instead, the candidate with the next highest number of votes is elected.

==== District ====
The total number of votes is decisive for the allocation of seats in the constituencies. The total number of votes for a party or group of voters is determined by adding their first and second votes. Unlike in federal elections, first votes are also taken into account for the proportional allocation of seats.

In the allocation of seats, only those parties and voting groups that receive at least 5% of the total votes in Bavaria are considered. The constituency seats are distributed among these parties proportionally according to the Sainte-Laguë method. Up to and including the 1990 state election, the D'Hondt method, which is more favorable for large parties, was used, but the Constitutional Court of Bavariadeclared this unconstitutional in 1992. Thereafter, the Hare/Niemeyer method was used. After the switch to the Sainte-Laguë method was made for the 2018 district council elections and the 2020 local elections, the electoral law of the state parliament was also changed to the Sainte-Laguë method in 2022.

If the party or voting group has won fewer constituencies in the constituency than it is entitled to seats, the remaining seats go to the candidates on their constituency list with the most total votes. Candidates already elected in the constituency are disregarded. Because first and second votes are added together, constituency candidates are significantly favoured over the other candidates on the constituency list.

==== Overhang and compensatory mandates ====
If a party wins more constituency seats than it is entitled to under the seat allocation procedure, it retains these additional seats. To compensate, the number of seats in the constituency in question is increased until a proportional distribution of seats among all lists in the constituency is achieved (see also "compensatory mandate") . The constituency in question is thus overrepresented in the state parliament.

If a party has the most overhanging list in several constituencies, it has a systematic advantage by receiving the last seat in each of these constituencies.

The regulation for overhang mandates has been changed several times. Originally, if one party had overhang mandates, the other parties received fewer seats, and the size of the state parliament remained the same. In the 1950 state election, the CSU received two overhang mandates in Swabia, while the SPD and the Bavarian Party each received one seat less. Statewide, the CSU had one more seat with a share of the vote of 27.4% than the SPD with 28% of the votes. Shortly before the 1954 state election, a change was made according to which overhang mandates were no longer allocated, and the constituency candidates on the overhang list with the fewest total votes were eliminated as surplus. As a result, the CSU lost two direct mandates in Lower Bavaria in the 1954 election. A lawsuit by the CSU parliamentary group against the change at the Constitutional Court before the election was unsuccessful. The next change followed in 1966, whereby overhang mandates remained with the party without compensation. In 1973, compensation mandates were introduced, but the number of compensation mandates was limited to the number of overhang mandates. The limitation on compensation mandates was abolished in 1993.

==== Majority clause ====
If a party or voting group receives more than half of the statewide votes counted for seat allocation, but does not achieve an absolute majority in the state parliament, it will be allocated as many additional seats as necessary until it achieves an absolute majority. These seats will go to the candidates who have not yet been elected and who received the highest number of votes nationwide.

=== State funding for parties and voter groups ===
Party funding is regulated by the Federal Party Law. All parties that receive at least 1% of the total votes nationwide are eligible for state funding. The amount of state funding is based on the average of the first and second votes. Voter groups that receive at least 1% of the total votes receive €1.28 per total vote.

== See also ==
- Bayerischer Landtag
- Politisches System Bayerns
- Liste der Landtagswahlergebnisse in Bayern
- Liste der Wahl- und Stimmkreise in Bayern
- Wahlsystem

== Literature ==
- Rainer A. Roth: Politische Landeskunde: Freistaat Bayern. 3. Auflage. Bayerische Landeszentrale für Politische Bildungsarbeit, München 2000.
- Frank Höfer: Die politische Ordnung in Bayern. 6. Auflage. Bayerische Landeszentrale für Politische Bildungsarbeit, München 2001.
- Enno Boettcher, Reinhard Högner, Cornelius Thum, Werner Kreuzholz: Landeswahlgesetz, Bezirkswahlgesetz und Landeswahlordnung Bayern: Kommentar. 18. Auflage. Kohlhammer/Deutscher Gemeindeverlag, Stuttgart 2013, ISBN 978-3-555-01591-0.
- Cornelius Thum, Michael Greiner: Bayerisches Landeswahlrecht und Bezirkswahlrecht: Kommentare. Gemeinde- und Schulverlag Bavaria, München 2003, ISBN 3-89382-207-0.
