= Direktmandat =

Parliamentary seat

In Germany, a direktmandat (English: direct mandate) is a parliamentary seat that is won by the candidate who receives the most votes in a constituency in a legislative election. In the mixed-member proportional representation system used in Germany, a political party receives mandates on the state list for the number of seats it wins in the constituencies, so that direct mandates generally have no influence on the number of seats the parties have in parliament. In contrast, in a majority voting system such as in the United Kingdom or the United States, the number of seats the parties have depends exclusively on their success in the constituencies.

== Germany ==
=== Bundestag ===
Under the federal election law, 299 members of the German Bundestag are elected directly in their Bundestag constituency. At least another 299 (299 plus any compensatory mandates for levelling purposes) are elected via their party's electoral list (list candidate). The first vote and the second vote can be cast independently of each other. In the election to the German Bundestag, the direct mandates are awarded by the first votes in accordance with the Federal Election Law.

According to the Bundestag electoral system, candidates from political parties and possibly independent candidates as individuals, compete against each other in each constituency. Election results are calculated according to plurality voting, i.e. the candidate with the most votes is elected as a constituency representative.

Until 2023, if a political party was able to win at least three direct mandates, it automatically received extra seats according to its share of second votes even if it had won less than the five percent electoral threshold of the second votes (basic mandate clause). This was last the case in 2021, when The Left Party was able to win three direct mandates but only 4.9% of the second votes. In the 1953 West German federal election, one basic mandate was enough, which was the last time the German Centre Party was represented in the Bundestag. The total number of mandates a party receives is determined by its share of the second votes. The direct mandates are deducted from the mandates to which it is entitled based on this share, and the remainder are filled with candidates from the list.

If a party has more direct mandates than it is entitled to based on second votes, overhang mandates arise. Since compensatory mandates have been in place since 2013, overhangs do increase the size of the Bundestag for a party, but until 2020 they no longer brought it a systematic advantage through a higher share of mandates. Since 2020, up to three overhang mandates were not compensated. If a member of parliament who holds such an uncompensated overhang mandate leaves the Bundestag, unlike in other cases, no list candidate takes their place. This was the case when Stefan Müller and Andreas Scheuer (both CSU) resigned in 2024.

After changes adopted in 2023, overhang mandates will generally no longer arise, which is achieved by not awarding direct mandates if a party has received too few primary votes in a state. The awarding of direct mandates to the runner-up was rejected by the coalition parties as a "difficult to explain violation of an at least intuitively plausible concept of justice". Such a regulation is provided for, for example, in the Bavarian state electoral system if a party receives less than 5% of the votes and therefore does not receive any mandates.

If an individual candidate wins the relative majority in a constituency, he or she will definitely receive the direct mandate (see currently Section 6 Paragraph 2 in conjunction with Section 20 Paragraph 3 of the Federal Election Act). However, this has only occurred in the initial Bundestag election of 1949. Before the election law amendment of 2023, this also applied to candidates of a party that had received neither more than 5% of the second votes nor the basic mandates, which meant that after the 2002 German federal election, the Party of Democratic Socialism (PDS) was represented in the Bundestag with two MPs.

Members of the Bundestag elected via direct mandates by party
Year	CDU	CSU	SPD	FDP	BP	DP	Zentrum	PDS/ Die Linke	Bündnis 90/ Grüne	AfD	Unabhängige	Total
1949	91	24	96	12	11	5	–	–	–	–	3	242
1953	130	42	45	14	–	10	1	–	–	–	–	242
1957	147	47	46	1	–	6	–	–	–	–	–	247
1961	114	42	91	–	–	–	–	–	–	–	–	247
1965	118	36	94	–	–	–	–	–	–	–	–	248
1969	87	34	127	–	–	–	–	–	–	–	–	248
1972	65	31	152	–	–	–	–	–	–	–	–	248
1976	94	40	114	–	–	–	–	–	–	–	–	248
1980	81	40	127	–	–	–	–	–	–	–	–	248
1983	136	44	68	–	–	–	–	–	–	–	–	248
1987	124	45	79	–	–	–	–	–	–	–	–	248
1990	192	43	91	1	–	–	–	1	–	–	–	328
1994	177	44	103	–	–	–	–	4	–	–	–	328
1998	74	38	212	–	–	–	–	4	–	–	–	328
2002	82	43	171	–	–	–	–	2	1	–	–	299
2005	106	44	145	–	–	–	–	3	1	–	–	299
2009	173	45	64	–	–	–	–	16	1	–	–	299
2013	191	45	58	–	–	–	–	4	1	–	–	299
2017	185	46	59	–	–	–	–	5	1	3	–	299
2021	98	45	121	–	–	–	–	3	16	16	–	299

=== State elections ===
The members of most state parliaments are partly elected directly in their constituency and partly via their party's electoral list (a candidate may only stand in one constituency). Only in Hamburg, Bremen and Saarland are there no single-member constituencies. The proportion of direct mandates in the total number of seats varies between the different federal states. In principle, the procedure for allocating seats is similar. There are compensatory mandates everywhere for overhang mandates. In Mecklenburg-Western Pomerania, Lower Saxony, Saxony and Saxony-Anhalt, the number of compensatory mandates is limited, so that unbalanced overhang mandates can arise.

There are no electoral lists in the election to the Landtag of Baden-Württemberg. Here, direct mandates, which are called first mandates in Baden-Württemberg, are awarded to the winners of the respective constituencies and second mandates to the defeated constituency candidates with the highest share of the vote.

== See also ==
- State list (Germany)
