= Second vote =

Type of vote in the electoral system of Germany

Explanatory video: First and second votes in the federal election

In Germany, the second vote (German: Zweitstimme) is generally the decisive vote for the allocation of seats to the political parties. With it, the voter chooses a party whose candidates are put together on a state list. In addition to the second vote, the voter can cast a first vote (German: Erststimme), with which he or she votes for a candidate in the constituency. The validity of the second vote remains unaffected by any invalidity of the first vote (Section 39 of the Federal Election Law).

In some German state electoral systems, the vote corresponding to the second vote is called the list vote (Saxony) or the state vote (Thuringia, Rhineland-Palatinate, Hesse). In New Zealand, which also uses a mixed-member proportional system, the vote corresponding to the second vote is called the party vote. It has been proposed that the second vote in the federal election be renamed the list vote.

== Background ==
The two-vote system has existed in Germany since 1953. The change to personalized proportional representation with first and second votes took place together with the introduction of the nationwide five percent hurdle for the second federal election in 1953 (Federal Election Law of 25 June 1953). Since the 1987 federal election, seats have been allocated according to the Hare/Niemeyer method. Following a change in the law passed in January 2008, seats will in future be allocated according to the Sainte-Laguë method.

== Distribution across mandates ==
All at least 598 proportional mandates are distributed according to their nationwide second vote numbers among the parties that receive at least 5 percent of the valid second votes nationwide (see electoral threshold clause) or win at least three direct mandates (basic mandate clause, direct mandate or alternative clause).

The share of seats in the Bundestag held by a party therefore corresponds roughly to its share of the votes it received. Distortions arise from the threshold clause. According to Section 6 Paragraph 1 Sentence 2 of the Federal Election Law, the second votes of those voters who voted with their first vote for a successful candidate who was either not nominated by a party that also ran on a state list or (this has only been the case since 2011) was nominated by a party that failed to meet the threshold clause are not taken into account for the allocation of seats. This regulation is intended to prevent these voters from exerting a de facto double influence on the composition of the German Bundestag.

== Election statistics ==
Since German federal elections the first and second votes are cast on a single ballot paper, voting behaviour in relation to a separate allocation of first and second votes can be evaluated as part of the general election statistics. In the 2013 German federal election, 89.8% of those who gave the Christian Democratic Union of Germany (CDU) their second vote also gave them their first vote. For the Social Democratic Party of Germany (SPD) the corresponding figure was 84.1%, and for the Christian Social Union in Bavaria (CSU) 92.3%. Split-ticket voting is more common among smaller parties because they are generally not expected to achieve the first vote majority relevant to a mandate in their respective constituency. Despite this, 69.2% of those who gave Die Linke their second vote also voted for this party with their first vote, compared to 51.4% for the Greens and 27.4% for the Free Democratic Party (FDP).

The allocation of first votes by second-vote voters of the smaller parties can be influenced by the person of the direct candidate, but also by secondary party sympathies. In the case of the FDP, it is significant that during the social-liberal coalition, 29.9% of its second-vote voters supported the SPD direct candidate with their first vote in 1976 and 35.5% in 1980, while in the first election after the coalition change in 1983, 58.3% supported the CDU/CSU candidate, and the figure showed great fluctuations in subsequent elections. In the 2013 federal election, it was 63.1%. The Greens' second-vote voters gave their first vote in this election to the SPD by 34.4%, and to the Left by 15.7%.

== See also ==
- Electoral system of Germany
