= Negative vote weight =

Negative vote weight (also known as inverse success value) is a situation in which a vote has the opposite effect of what the voter intended. A vote for a party might result in the loss of seats in parliament, or the party might gain extra seats by not receiving votes. This runs counter to the principle that voting for an option in a democratic election should always increase their chances of winning, compared to not voting (participation criterion) or voting against it (monotonicity criterion).

== Theory ==
The effect that a vote for a party might result in the loss of a seat is contrary to the requirement that every vote in a democratic election should have the same weight. It also violates the requirement that the vote may not explicitly run counter to the intention of the voter.

The phenomenon of negative vote weight should not be conflated with "negative votes" in score voting systems, which allows a voter to indicate dislike for a candidate without boosting another (for example by introducing an "oppose" option which causes one vote to be deducted from the disliked candidate's vote total).

== Germany ==
The phenomenon of negative vote weight occurred in several past federal elections in Germany, including the election in 2009. The negative vote weight could occur in a state where a party had overhang seats. In such a state, in many circumstances a vote for a given party would not increase its national seat total (MMP allocations are calculated at the national level in Germany), but might increase the proportion of the party's national seats to be allocated to the state where the vote was cast and which already had overhang seats (overhang seats being allocated at the state level). This effectively decreased the party's total seat count, and the voter would have been better served by not voting for that party.

The Federal Constitutional Court of Germany ruled on 3 July 2008 that this was unconstitutional, as a negative vote weight is incompatible with the constitutional guarantee of equality and directness. Accordingly, the election law was changed in February 2013.

== Other representative democracies ==
Negative vote weight is possible in national elections in the Czech Republic and Romania. It can also occur in some of the Austrian states' local elections. In both cases, however, the incidence is lower, and the effect is less pronounced than in Germany.

== Referendums ==
Negative vote weight can occur in popular referendums that have a vote quorum (where the proposed change is considered only if a minimum number of people vote). A vote against the proposal can cause the quorum to be satisfied and thus result in the acceptance of the proposal. For this reason, some popular referendums aim for an approving quorum where the proposed change is only considered if a minimum number of people vote for the proposal.

== See also ==
- Participation criterion
- Monotonicity criterion
