= State list (Germany) =

List of a party's candidates for an election

In Germany, the state list or state electoral proposal, (German: Landesliste or Landeswahlvorschlag) is the list of candidates of a party for the election to the Bundestag, or the elections to those state parliaments with mixed-member proportional representation and for the European Parliament elections if a party decides on a state rather than a federal list. In contrast to the vote on the candidates of the constituencies, who are elected directly (Direktmandat), voters can usually only vote on the candidates on the state list as a whole by voting for a party with their second vote. Depending on the distribution of seats in parliament, the corresponding number of list candidates in the order of the list of the respective party are considered elected.

The possibility of distributing votes to specific candidates on a state list is called cumulation and panachage and can change the order. This has been introduced in some states, such as Bavaria, Bremen and Hamburg, but has only been discussed in others.

Almost all candidates from the top spots on the state list, including those from the established, smaller parties, are also candidates in one constituency. This means that they are likely to enter parliament even if they do not win their constituency. This is why established politicians or politicians who are supported by the party for various reasons (age, gender, origin, lateral entrants, etc.) almost always occupy the top spots on the respective state list. If the candidates win the constituency in this case, the candidate on the next spot on the state list who was unable to win a constituency or who did not stand in any constituency is considered.

The state list is drawn up at the party congresses in accordance with the Party Law. There are no federal lists (in the sense of nationwide candidate lists) in federal elections. The list places are distributed according to the second vote results in the respective states.

Political parties that are not among the established parties must support their election proposal, i.e. a state list filled with people, by collecting signatures after it has been announced to the State election officer. In the case of a federal election, the minimum number of signatures depends on the number of eligible voters in the state in the last federal election and is a maximum of 2,000. Different provisions apply to elections to state parliaments. A party that wishes to represent a recognized minority is exempt from this rule at both federal and state level.

== See also ==
- Apportionment (politics)
- Electoral system
- Suffrage
- Electoral list
