= Electoral system of Germany =

Federal Bundestag election regulation

The German federal election system regulates the election of the members of the national parliament, called the Bundestag. According to the principles governing the law of elections, set down in Art. 38 of the German constitution, elections are to be universal, direct, free, equal, and secret. Furthermore, the constitution stipulates that Bundestag elections are to take place every four years and that one can vote, and be elected, upon reaching the age of 18. All other stipulations for the federal elections are regulated by the Federal Electoral Act. Elections always take place on a Sunday. Mail votes are possible upon application.

Germans elect their members of parliament with two votes. The first vote is for a direct candidate, who is required to receive a plurality vote in their electoral district. The second vote is used to elect a party list in each state as established by its respective party caucus. The Bundestag comprises, then, the seats representing each electoral district on the first vote and the seats allocated to maintain proportionality based on the second vote. Common practice is that direct candidates are also placed on the electoral lists at higher rankings as a fall-back in case they do not win their districts.

== Constitutional basis ==
=== Principles governing the law of elections ===
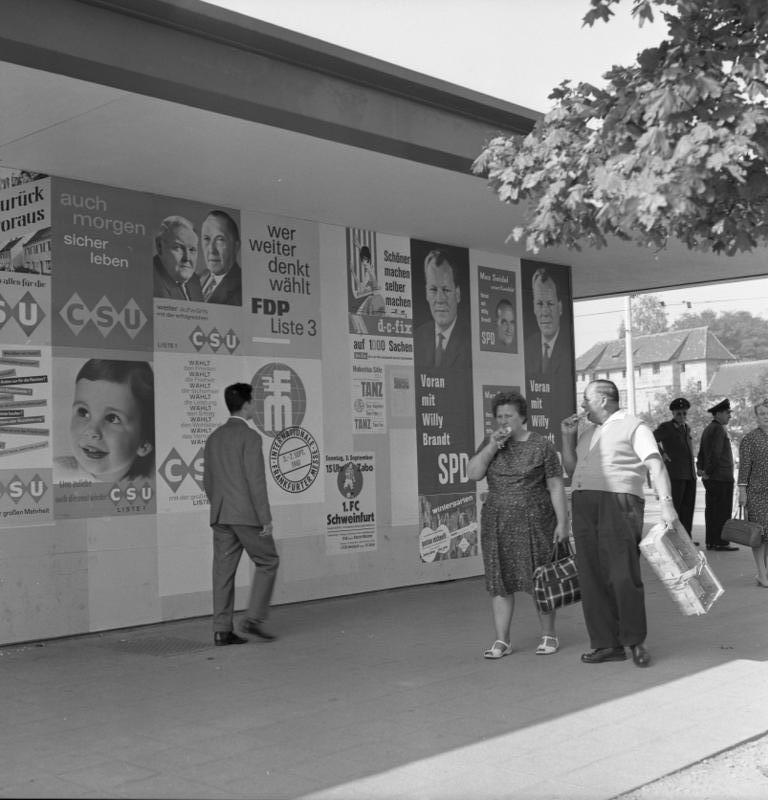
Election posters in Nürnberg, Federal Election of 1961

According to Article 38, §1 of the German constitution, "the delegates of the German Parliament (Bundestag) [...] are elected in a general, direct, free, equal and secret vote." These five principles of suffrage are fundamental rights: Any violation of the law can be brought up to the Federal Constitutional Court of Germany in the form of a constitutional complaint.

An election is general if basically every citizen can take part: no restrictions in terms of income, sex, health, or any other arbitrary distinctions. But according to the jurisdiction of the Federal Constitutional Court, the prescription of a minimum voting age is compatible with the commonalty of the election. The exclusion from the active right to vote is also—within narrow limitations—consistent with the Basic Constitutional Law. The exclusion of the passive right to vote is governed by somewhat less strict regulations. The right to vote is in principle reserved for German citizens and the so-called "status Germans," who are refugees and expelled persons of German descent that settled in Germany. The introduction of a right to vote for foreigners would require an alteration of §20 of the constitution.

An election is immediate if the voters' will determines the result directly. The process of an election based on lists compiled by the political parties is, however, compatible with the principle of an immediate election.

An election is considered free if the government does not compel the people's voting decision in terms of content. According to the Federal Constitutional Court's dispensation of justice, the principle of a free ballot would not be harmed if a compulsory vote was introduced by the Federal Electoral Law. Electoral advertising at government expense would, however, be incompatible with this principle of electoral law. However, the Federal Government (made up of different political parties) is allowed to conduct public relations if its neutrality is strictly preserved.

Elections are confidential if the voter's decision is not known to anybody else. The German Parliament's voting law even states that no elector is allowed to announce his decision in the polling station. Postal voting is problematic because the secrecy of the ballot is not guaranteed; it has therefore to be taken as an exceptional case. Since the election's more important basic principle of universal suffrage would otherwise be violated, postal votes are admissible.

In principle, an election is considered equal if all electoral votes have the same weight. This is, for example, not the case if constituencies differ considerably in size or if gerrymandering causes advantages or disadvantages for certain groups of people.

For electoral lawmaking, the most difficult part in terms of constitutional principles is the equality of the election. On the one hand, certain inequalities are unavoidable as the constituencies can not be of exactly equal size and the turnout, too, is not homogenous. On the other hand, the Überhangmandate (the 'overhang', or extra seats in Parliament a party gets due to gaining more constituency seats than it is entitled to according to Parliament's proportional seating principle) and a negatives Stimmgewicht (negative vote weight: an unwanted outcome changing an elector's vote to the opposite of their intended political will expressed with that vote) might influence the "one man, one vote" principle. On 3 July 2008, the Federal Constitutional Court declared the paradox of the negatives Stimmgewicht to be unconstitutional. The court allowed three years for these changes, so the 2009 federal election was not affected. The changes were due by 30 June 2011, but appropriate legislation was not completed by that deadline. A new electoral law was enacted in late 2011, but declared unconstitutional once again by the Federal Constitutional Court upon lawsuits from the opposition parties and a group of some 4,000 private citizens.

Finally, four of the five factions in the Bundestag agreed on an electoral reform whereby the number of seats in the Bundestag will be increased as much as necessary to ensure that any overhang seats are compensated through apportioned leveling seats to ensure full proportionality according to the political party's share of party votes at the national level. The Bundestag approved and enacted the new electoral reform in February 2013.

The five percent rule and the overhang are in principle approved by the Federal Constitutional Court and the German jurisprudence.

=== Suffrage ===
==== Right to vote ====
Suffrage is the civil right to vote. All German citizens over the age of 18 are allowed to vote (Art. 38, para. 2 of the Basic Law for the Federal Republic of Germany), as long as they have lived in Germany after reaching the age of 14 for at least a three-month continuous period that was within 25 years of the election.

According to Art. 20, para. 2, p. 1 all power emanates from the people, that is the people of Germany. Therefore, Art. 12 para. 1 of German Federal Electoral Law determines in accordance with constitutional law, that only Germans in the sense of Art. 116, para. 1 are eligible to vote.

Excluded from suffrage are Germans,

- who have been deprived of active suffrage by a court in connection with a conviction because of delicts within the fields of treason, compromise of the democratic constitutional state, threat to the external national security, criminal offence against constitutional bodies, as well as criminal offence at elections and ballots, as well as indictable offences against the national defence. (§§ 13 Nr. 1 BWahlG, 92a, 101, 108c, 109i, 45 Abs. 5 StGB)
- for whom had been ordered a custodian with contained field of activity through interlocutory injunction (§ 13 Nr. 2 BWahlG)
- who find themselves in an asylum according to §§ 63, 20 StGB after having committed an illegal action being criminally incapable because of an order from the criminal court

==== Eligibility to stand for election ====
Every German who has reached the age of majority, in Germany 18 years, is eligible to stand for election according to the German Basic Law (article 38, paragraph 2 BL). It has to be remarked that the age of majority can be altered by a simple federal law.

Eligibility to stand for election presupposes the right to vote. However, some German citizens are not permanent residents of Germany and also do not have the right to vote as a German citizen living abroad. They can still be elected if they meet all the other requirements. Yet, people can be deprived of their eligibility to stand for election in certain circumstances. This can happen in the case of an imprisonment of more than a year as is laid down in § 45, subparagraph 1 in the Strafgesetzbuch, the German criminal law.

== Election management bodies ==
The most important election management body is the Federal Returning Officer, appointed by the Federal Ministry of the Interior. Responsibilities include running electoral procedures and chairing the election committee. The leader of the Federal Statistical Office usually holds this office. The Federal Returning Officer is assisted by the electoral committee and the Returning Officers of each Bundesland, the election supervisors and the electoral committee of each constituency as well as the election judges and the managing committee of each electoral ward. They are appointed by the federal government. The other members of the electoral committees are appointed by the Returning Officer.

Election management bodies (EMBs) are institutions of independent, societal self-organisation. In general they are considered to be a sort of federal agency. The Federal Ministry of the Interior, the Supreme Federal Authority, is responsible for the enactment of certain regulations necessary for federal election procedures. However, the Federal Ministry of the Interior does not have the authority to issue directives against the election management bodies.

== Scrutiny of elections ==
Within two months after the federal election (German: Bundestagswahl) any voter can request the scrutiny of elections. According to the established practice of the Federal Constitutional Court (Bundesverfassungsgericht) the Committee for the Scrutiny of Elections of the Bundestag, the parliament of Germany, has to reject a request if the distribution of mandates did not change even with the request being granted. The Committee for the Scrutiny of Elections only makes sure that the Federal Voting Act is implemented properly; it does not deal with possible unconstitutionalities.

If the Bundestag rejects the veto, an appeal to scrutiny of elections can be lodged to the Federal Constitutional Court of Germany within another two months. This appeal has to be joined by 100 eligible voters.

Affected members lose their seat in parliament if the veto is successful. This member can in turn file a lawsuit against the adjudication.

No appeal to scrutiny of elections against decisions made by the German Bundestag has thus far been successful.

== Party structure ==
=== Membership ===
Political parties are required to be membership-based, and the party determines its membership based upon its own bylaws, i.e., the party itself determines who can join, leave, and who is excluded from the party. Applications for membership may be rejected without justification, and party bylaws may impose requirements and restrictions on membership, but may not discriminate based on gender, age, religion or ethnicity. All parties have membership fees, which range from 0.5%–4.0% of members' salaries, with reduced fees for low-income members. There is no collective membership. (For example, some countries' labor unions have enrolled its members in parties automatically.)

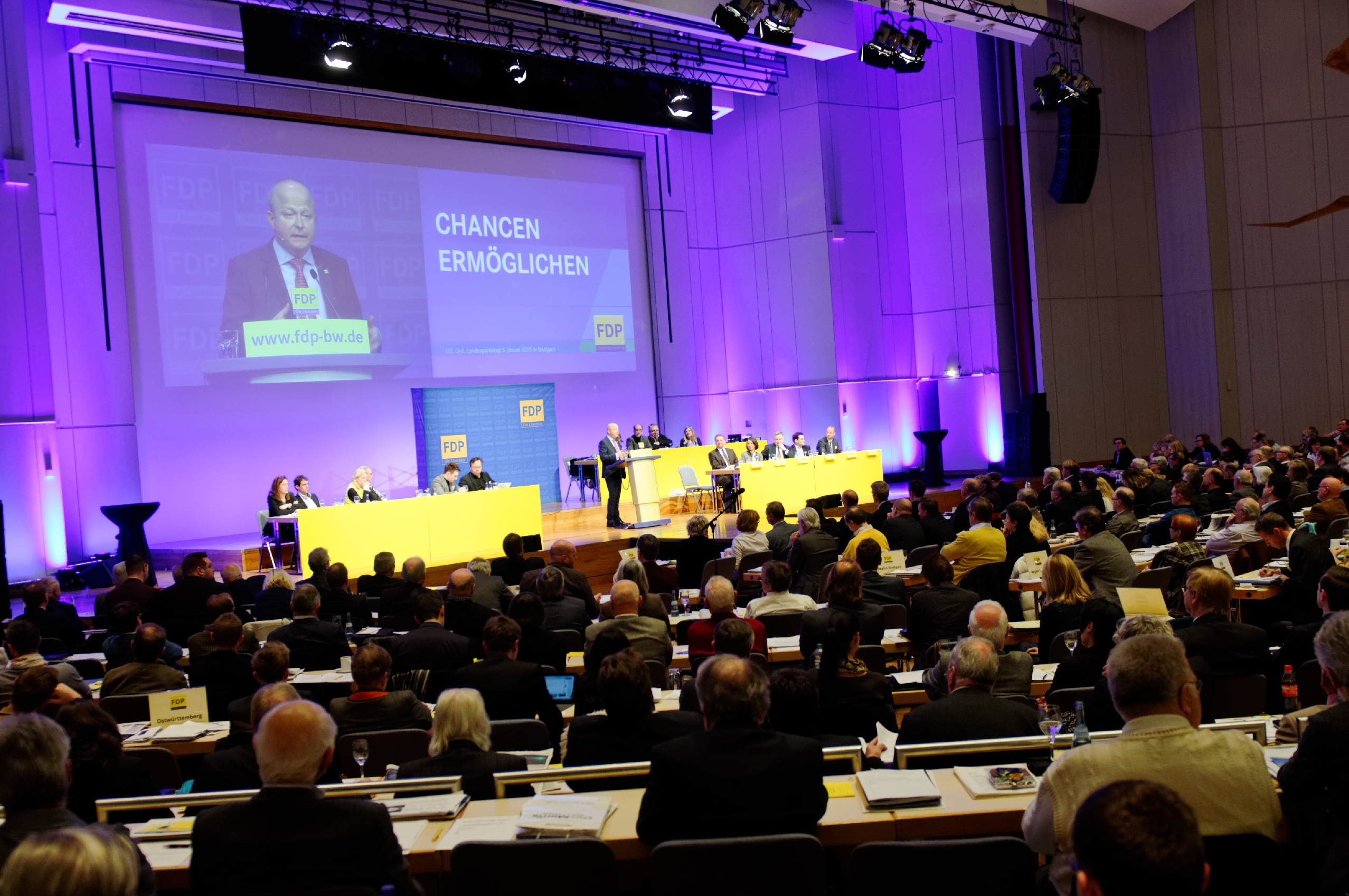
A 2015 state-level party convention in Stuttgart

As parties can reject applications without justification, it is possible to discriminate unofficially. Similarly to other parties using male pronouns for all genders, the feminist party Die Frauen even calls all its members women in its bylaws, but claims this term also applies to men.

=== Governance ===
Full membership assemblies are used at the local- or district-level, but most parties rely on delegate assemblies (Parteitag or party conventions) above district-level, although all established parties use non-binding full membership referendums for important decisions such as leadership selection.

== Appointment of candidates ==
=== The parties' right to propose candidates ===
Only parties that have been represented in the Bundestag or a Landtag by at least five delegates since the last election are entitled to propose their own candidates. Other parties have to announce their candidature to the Federal Returning Officer in time, i.e. not later than 90 days before the election day of periodic elections of the Bundestag. They must have been accepted as a party by the Federal Electoral Committee beforehand.

=== Proposal of candidates for constituencies ===
The applicants from a party must be elected in a democratic and secret election by an assembly of the party members in a constituency or by a similar board appointed by the party. Every party member entitled to vote is allowed to propose candidates. A candidate does not have to be a member of the party. Since the 2009 German Bundestag elections no member of a different party may be nominated. A written record of the election must be presented to the District Returning Officer, who is responsible for checking the proposal. He points out possible deficiencies and allows remedies to be made.

A constituency election nomination is only accepted if the nominee belongs to a party that is represented in the Bundestag or the Landtag, or if the party represents a national minority. Otherwise the nominee must have at least 200 signatures from eligible voters in the constituency. It does not make a difference whether the suggestion is handed in by a party or not. Hence a candidate does not need to be supported by a party in a constituency if he has sufficient signatures. The county election nominee must also nominate a person of trust and a proxy who are allowed to release statements to the leader of the county election.

A constituency election nomination can be recalled either by a joint statement from the two persons of trust or by a statement from the majority of the signataries of the nominee. Through a declaration from the two persons of trust the name of the suggested person can be changed in case the originally suggested person loses his eligibility or dies. Once the nomination is authorised it can neither be recalled nor changed.

If a candidate with a direct mandate dies before election day, the election is cancelled in that constituency. Within the next six weeks, a by-election is held, giving the opportunity to the deceased candidate's party to appoint a substitute candidate. This by-election follows the same rules as the main election. This means that Germans who have come of age in the time between the main and the by-election are not allowed to vote.

=== Regional lists of parliamentary candidates for election to Federal Parliament ===
According to the Federal Election Law the nominations for the regional lists basically result from the same system as the constituency nominations. In addition, the order of the regional list is determined by secret election.

The regional list of a party which is neither represented in the Federal Parliament nor in a State Parliament and which does not represent a national minority, requires for its admission the signing of at least one-thousandth of the state's eligible voters, not exceeding 2,000 signatures. For the nomination of confidants and the modification of the regional list, the regulations concerning the constituency nominations are applied correspondingly.

For the calculation of the electoral threshold, the candidate lists on state level of one party are generally treated as connected, unless the confidants issue a differing declaration to the Federal Returning Officer.

== Voting system ==
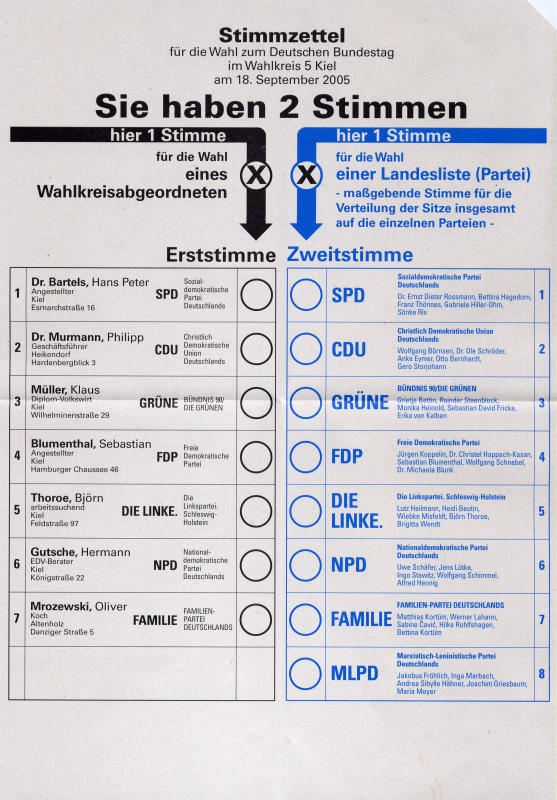
Example: Ballot of constituency 5: Kiel in Schleswig-Holstein for the election of the 16th Bundestag.

The voter has two votes. The federal election system distinguishes between 'first' and 'second' votes. However, these terms refer neither to a hierarchical order of importance of the votes, nor to a logical (chronological) sequence in a valid election process. According to public polls, between 63% (2005) and 70% (2002) of voters mistakenly thought the first vote to be more important than the second. In some state election systems that have two voting systems modelled after the federal election setup, the votes are called 'vote for person' and 'vote for list'. It is important that both votes have distinct functions.

=== First vote ===
The first vote allows the elector to vote for a direct candidate of their constituency, who applies for a direct mandate in the Bundestag (see illustration above, no. 2). A plurality voting system is used, which means that the candidate who receives more votes than any other candidate gets the mandate. If the vote results in a tie, the lot drawn by the leader of the regional election is decisive. In this case, the votes for the other candidates are invalid. The primary function of the first vote is to personalize the election. As there are 299 constituencies at the moment, the same number of mandates in the Bundestag are distributed to the elected candidates in each district. However, the first vote does not determine the power of the parties in the Bundestag. For each direct mandate in a Bundesland the party always receives one mandate fewer from the second vote.

The size and the geographical shape of the electoral constituencies are revised by an electoral committee appointed by Germany's Head of State. The final decision is made by the German Bundestag and can be found in an attachment to the federal electoral law.

=== Second vote ===
For the distribution of seats in the German Bundestag, the second vote is more important than the first vote. This second vote allows the elector to vote for a party whose candidates are put together on the regional electoral list. Based on the proportion of second votes, the 598 mandates are distributed to the parties which have achieved at least 5 percent of valid second votes (i.e. reached the electoral threshold). Following the 1987 German Bundestag elections, the distribution of seats was made according to the Hare-Niemeyer method. Due to a change in the law passed in January 2008, the distribution of seats is now made according to the Sainte-Laguë/Schepers method.

The proportion of seats a party gets in the Bundestag approximately equates to the percentage of votes the party gets in the election. Discrepancies result from overhang and the electoral threshold. According to §6, para. 1, clause 2 of the Federal Election Law the electors' second votes are not accounted for if those electors give their first votes to a successful and autonomous direct candidate (a candidate who is not nominated by a party). This rule is designed to prevent a double influence on the composition of the Bundestag.

A similar problem occurred at the federal election in 2002. The PDS got two direct mandates in Berlin, but with only 4.0% of second votes they failed to pass the electoral threshold. The second votes from the electors who voted for those direct candidates counted nevertheless, since in this case both candidates belonged to a party which had handed in a regional list in that Bundesland. In its decision of November 23, 1988 (Federal Constitutional Law 79, 161), the Federal Constitutional Court pointed out the relevant loophole in the Federal Election Law to the legislative body. Abolishing the system with first and second votes with the possibility of splitting votes – meaning the elector's option to vote for a direct candidate and for a party independently – would solve the problem automatically.

=== Abstention and spoilt votes ===
German parliamentary election law does not have explicit abstention; a ballot paper without markings on it is considered a spoilt vote (separated into first and second vote).

Furthermore, votes are spoilt if the voter's intention cannot be recognised without doubt, if the ballot paper contains additions or conditions or if it is not an official document. Since the general elections in 2009, only the first vote is spoilt on ballot papers designed for a different constituency as long as they contain the correct regional list for the second vote.

The law of the German federal election does not consider ballot papers which are marked in a way that endangers the confidentiality of the ballot (as, for example, votes marked with an upright cross) as spoilt.

There are further reasons for invalidity concerning the postal vote: Both votes are invalidated if the envelope for the postal vote is empty, if it contains several differently marked ballot papers or if it actually should have been rejected (including also those ballot paper envelopes which differ from the rest in a way that endangers the election secrecy.) In contrast, the votes of voters who die or lose their right to vote before the ballot vote takes place explicitly remain valid.

Invalid votes, equally to non posted votes, have no effect on the result of the poll. Nevertheless, their number is officially counted and published.

According to § 4 of the election statistics act, the cause of invalidity is also a census criterion to be mentioned in the official election statistics. The numbers for a total of twelve categories of (partly) invalid ballot papers have been published at last (for the Federal Parliament elections in 2005).

However, it only concerns combinations of the three basic categories "empty or crossed out", "multiple crosses" and "other causes", divided into first and second votes. Thus one can hardly deduce the reason for the invalidity; whether it was a matter of purpose, mistake or just ignorance of the voting right. For combinations of invalid and valid votes on a ballot paper, the belonging elected (major) parties have been deciphered as well.

Invalid votes count as non votes in the financing of the parties. The parties do not receive any money for them. As the party's financing is capped and the total sum is regularly being utilised, the discrepancy of valid votes for parties who take part in financing is practically low. A small number of invalid votes is generally beneficial for parties with above average fund raising (membership fees included) seeing that more money remains in the bonus fund.

=== Electoral threshold ===
Seats in the German Bundestag are allocated to regional lists of parties that either pass a five percent electoral threshold of the federally valid second votes or win at least three constituencies. The distribution of seats does not take into account second votes for parties that meet neither requirement. Parties qualifying for proportional representation in this manner are recognized as party groups, as a party must win at least five percent of the vote to qualify as a full parliamentary party, or Fraktion. Those too small to form a fraktion can make a Gruppe instead.

The three-constituency rule favours smaller parties with a regional stronghold. For example, the German Party (DP) only won 3.3% of the second vote in 1953, but was able to win 15 seats by electing ten members from constituency seats, mostly in the party's heartland of Lower Saxony. In 1957, the DP won 3.4% of the second vote but elected six members from constituency seats, enabling them to send 17 members to the Bundestag. The three-constituency rule was not used again until 1994, when the PDS won four direct mandates in Berlin, enabling them to send 30 delegates to the Bundestag, despite the fact that they had only 4.4% of the second vote. It was used in the 2021 election, in which PDS's successor, Die Linke, won exactly three constituencies (Berlin-Treptow-Köpenick, Berlin-Lichtenberg, and Leipzig II), earning it 39 seats on 4.9% of the second vote.

This clause is meant to minimise the risk of party fragmentation, which contributed to the incapacitation of the Reichstag in the Weimar Republic. The clause is not explicitly mentioned in the constitution, as this could cause a conflict with the fundamental principle of equal votes (each vote must have equal weight). However, the general consensus is that the clause is important for the stability of the party system, the capacity of the parliament and the government, and the overall political stability of the state. Thus, a balance must be achieved between the two existing constitutional objectives. The Federal Constitutional Court approves of the threshold clause, arguing that violation of a constitutional principle (within certain limits) must be permitted if it is essential to achieve a more important constitutional objective. Therefore, the Federal Constitutional Court allows the threshold clause to be up to five percent. Thus, the legislature has no possibility of increasing it.

National minority parties, such as the SSW, which won a seat in the 2021 and 2025 parliamentary elections, are now freed from the electoral threshold under the constitutional imperative to protect minorities. This special regulation however does not necessarily apply to a Turkish party, as the Turkish do not yet enjoy the status of a national minority in Germany, unlike the Danish party in Schleswig-Holstein, the SSW, or the Sorbs in Saxony.

=== Distribution of seats ===
At first, the number of successful independent direct candidates and the successful direct candidates whose party did not make it into the German Bundestag are subtracted from the total number of 598 mandates. In the parliamentary election of 2002, both direct candidates were members of the PDS party. Only in the parliamentary election of 1949 were there successful independent direct candidates.

The remaining proportional mandates (596 seats in the election of 2002 and all of the 598 seats in 2005) are distributed among the parties which have obtained at least five per cent, or three direct mandates according to the results of all second votes, in the Sainte-Laguë/Schepers procedure (before the federal election in 2009 it was the Hare-Niemeyer procedure). Afterwards, the obtained proportional mandates of each party are distributed among the candidates' lists of the Bundesländer, according to the number of their second votes in the respective Bundesländer, by following the same procedure.

The outcome of this procedure shows how many proportional mandates each party has gained in each Bundesland. The candidates who have achieved a seat in the Bundestag can then be identified.

At first, the victorious direct candidates of a party obtain their mandates in a Bundesland. Within the Bundesländer, in which the number of achieved direct mandates of one party is smaller than the number of achieved proportional mandates, the difference is settled by list mandates i.e. candidates of the Bundesländer list in order of appearance, whereas candidates who have already gained a direct mandate in their district (no matter which Bundesland) are simply left out.

If a party in a Bundesland receives more direct mandates than proportional mandates, all the successful candidates in constituencies gain additional seats in the Bundestag. These seats are called overhang seats. Consequently, the Bundestag becomes larger by the number of additionally gained seats. Starting with the 2013 election, other parties receive leveling seats. In recent years, the number of overhang seats was 13 in 1998, 5 in 2002, 16 in 2005, 24 in 2009 and 33 in 2013. In 2017, after the formula was adjusted somewhat, there were 111 overhang and levelling seats. In theory, there is no limit to the possible number of overhang seats; this is because one or more parties could win constituency seats while having arbitrarily few list votes.

If a delegate of the Bundestag who was elected in a constituency in which his or her political party gained a number of excess mandates resigns, his or her seat remains free and cannot be used by the following candidate on the party's list. At the beginning of the 2002 legislative period the Bundestag consisted of 603 delegates. When SPD delegate Anke Hartnagel died and the head of SPD in Thuringia, Christoph Matschie, resigned, this regulation was enacted. As a consequence, the 15th Bundestag consisted of 601 members.

==== Fixing Bundestag seats at 630 ====
Debate over the awarding of overhang and leveling seats was renewed after the 2021 German federal election produced a Bundestag with 736 members, which made it the largest freely elected parliament in the world. The Scholz cabinet introduced a 2023 reform law to fix the size of the Bundestag at 630 members, which would be achieved by eliminating all overhang and leveling seats, as well as the Grundmandatsklausel which awards full proportional representation to parties winning at least three constituency seats, even if the five-percent threshold is not met. Instead, a party's total number of seats would be determined strictly by its share of Zweitstimmen (party votes), and the five-percent threshold is absolute. If a party wins overhang seats, the seat winners with the fewest votes would not enter the Bundestag. Parties representing minority groups are still exempt from the five-percent threshold. The law is subject to constitutional challenges by the CSU and The Left, both of whom benefit from the previous system, though President Frank-Walter Steinmeier signed the law after personally determining he believed it was constitutional.

== Classification and assessment of the system ==
The Bundestag, Germany's parliament, was elected according to the principle of mixed member proportional representation until the reforms of 2023 which introduced the Zweitstimmendeckung, essentially making it a party-list proportional system with a degree of localization.

Presently, the big parties are not considering introducing a majority voting system like they did at the beginning of the first grand coalition in 1966.

However, there has been major criticism of the federal election system, as it existed prior to 2013. The overhang seats are problematic in the sense that they distort the proportional representation (resulting from the second votes). The Federal Constitutional Court of Germany has found that this distinctive feature is compatible with the legislator's will of ensuring a regionally balanced composition of the Bundestag. Nevertheless, one consequence of the overhang seats is the paradoxical possibility that a party may receive more seats in the Bundestag by receiving fewer second votes in certain states, or fewer seats if they receive more votes. On July 3, 2008, the Federal Constitutional Court declared the possibility of this so-called "negative vote weight" (negatives Stimmgewicht) to be unconstitutional, and reforms were implemented in May 2013 that sharply reduced this possibility.

=== Discussions about the implementation of a majority voting system ===
By the end of 1955 the CDU/CSU (political union of the parties of the Christian Democratic Union and the Christian Social Union) together with the German party (German: Deutsche Partei (DP)) brought forward a first draft outlining a possible majority voting system. According to this draft 60 percent of the mandates were supposed to be determined by majority votes and only 40 percent according to proportional representation. Adenauer's attempt to end the CDU/CSU's dependence on the FDP (the Liberal Democratic Party) as well as to limit the SPD's (the Social Democratic Party) prospects of getting elected was unsuccessful.

When the first Grand Coalition (1966–1969) took office, there were strong tendencies within both major parties, CDU and SPD, to abandon proportional representation which had existed/had been applied since the foundation of the German Federal Republic in 1949. Instead, they suggested implementing the majority vote system. These plans were even part of the coalition agreement. The smaller FDP, which had no chance of winning the majority in an election district, protested because the implementation of this voting system would have threatened its further existence. Ultimately, however, the introduction of the majority vote system failed because large parts of the SPD were convinced that it would not have meant better prospects of power. Paul Lücke (CDU), Federal Minister of the Interior, resigned from office on April 2, 1968. Since then there have been no more attempts to introduce the majority vote system in Germany.

=== Forecast ===
The paradoxes which occur with the largest remainder method are avoided by the recent introduction of the Sainte-Laguë method. The difficulty of "negative vote weight" (where a voter's choosing to vote for a party makes it less likely that that party will gain seats in parliament) still remains possible. But German lawmakers adopted reforms in May 2013 that sharply reduce this possibility, following a July 2008 decision of the Federal Constitutional Court declaring negative vote weight unconstitutional.

== History ==
Election of the 1st German Bundestag (14 August 1949) – The election system which was valid for the election of the Bundestag in 1949 has been changed significantly in the following decades. Because the Parliamentary Council couldn't agree on a written formulation of the voting system in the Grundgesetz, the Federal Election Law was ratified by the heads of government of the German states. The right to vote was granted from the age of 21, the right to be elected from the age of 25.

The constitutional number of representatives counted 400, plus possible overhang seats and 19 Berlin representatives. The federal territory was divided into 242 electoral districts, each one having one direct candidate being elected according to the relative majority voting, which is still valid. As a result of two CDU overhang seats, the Bundestag of 1949 consisted of 402 representatives.

Each German state formed its own electoral district. Consequently, the number of representatives of a state was determined in advance (excluding overhang seats). Accordingly, the five-percent hurdle and the Grundmandat-clause (one direct mandate was sufficient to join the Bundestag) were valid merely in the federal states.

A single-vote system was used. Using this single vote, the voter elected both a state party list and a direct candidate of the same party from his electoral district. Therefore, the voter did not have the possibility to give separate, independent votes for the person or the direct candidate and the party or the list. The voter of an independent direct candidate had in comparison with the two-vote system of today not the possibility to vote a party, with the risk that his vote in a case of unsuccessfulness of the candidate was lost.

In case a direct candidate resigned from the Bundestag, the corresponding electoral district had to hold a reelection. This happened fourteen times, the first being the 1950 Kulmbach by-election.

The proportional mandates (Proporzmandate) were allocated using the D'Hondt method which disadvantages small parties. These parties were further disadvantaged because the seats were allocated on a per state basis.

Election of the 2nd German Bundestag (6 September 1953) – In 1953 for the first time, a law (Bundeswahlgesetz) designed by the German Bundestag was the basis for the federal elections. This law contained some major alterations compared to the former election law:

The dual-vote system with the respective possibility of vote splitting was introduced. In order to pass the electoral threshold, the party needed to receive a minimum of 5% of all second votes. Although the threshold was overruled for parties of national minorities, the Südschleswigsche Landesverband (SSW) was not able to re-enter into Parliament. The number of proportional seats increased from 400 to 484, while the 242 electoral districts were maintained. Consequently, the Bundestag is equally represented by seats voted directly as well as via second vote, disregarding additional second vote mandates that have resulted from overhang seats. The number of Berlin's parliament members increased from 19 to 22. In the case of a direct candidate withdrawing from the Bundestag, a new election in his voting district was no longer necessary. Instead, the candidate being next in the state's list of candidates ("Landesliste") would substitute the candidate.

Election of the 3rd German Bundestag (5 September 1957) – Today's electoral law is basically the same as it used to be in 1957. The two-stage distribution of seats connected with states' candidates lists was introduced, which brought along the problem of negative vote weight. At the same time, the disadvantage of smaller parties was clearly reduced with the D'Hondt method. The Grundmandatsklausel, which says that a party needs at least 5% of the second votes to get any seat in the Bundestag, was modified: from now on at least three direct mandates were needed to overcome this clause. Since the Saarland joined the Federal Republic of Germany on January 1, 1950, five electoral districts were added to the 242 already existing districts and the number of the mandates distributed by proportion was raised from 484 to 494. The absentee ballot was introduced as well.

Election of the 5th German Bundestag (19 September 1965) – The electoral districts were rearranged, the number was increased from 247 to 248. Accordingly, the number of mandates distributed by proportion was raised from 494 to 496.

Election of the 7th German Bundestag (19 November 1972) – By changing article 38 (2) of the Basic Law in 1970 the voting age was lowered from 21 to 18 and the legal age to be eligible for election was adapted to the voting age, which was 21 at that time. Before that, one had to be 25 to stand for election.

Election of the 8th German Bundestag (3 October 1976) – When the change of sec. 2 BGB (German Civil Code) came into effect on January 1, 1975, the age of consent was lowered from 21 to 18 years. This means that since the election of 1976 citizens have the right to vote and to run for office at the age of 18.

Election of the 11th German Bundestag (25 January 1987) – Since the German federal election in 1987, the largest remainder method, which is neutral towards the size of the parties, has been applied instead of the D'Hondt method. The discrimination of/against small parties when distributing mandates (Proporzmandate) could hereby be completely abolished. Because of paradoxes that occur in the largest remainder method, the danger of negative vote weight expanded to all federal states, even to those without overhang seats. The voting right for Germans living abroad was introduced during this election.

Election of the 12th German Bundestag (2 December 1990) – Briefly before the Bundestagswahl of 1990, the Federal Constitutional Court decided that the situation of the recently reunited Germany showed a special case. An electoral threshold for the entire election district was unconstitutional. For this reason, a party had to receive at least 5% of the second votes either in the old federal territory including West-Berlin or in the new federal territory in order to win seat in the German Bundestag (Lower House of German Parliament). This special regulation was only valid for the elections in 1990.

In the federal states that were formerly part of Eastern Germany, including Berlin, 80 constituencies were added. Because of this, the number of constituencies increased to 328, the number of proportional mandates to 656. Another consequence of German reunification was the abolition of a special regulation for West Berlin. This regulation prescribed that the Berlin City Parliament elected 22 representatives into the Bundestag on the day of the federal election.

Election of the 15th German Bundestag (22 September 2002) – For the election of the Bundestag in 2002, the number of constituencies was reduced from 328 to 299, as was the number of proportional mandates (from 656 to 598).

Election of the 17th German Bundestag (27 September 2009) – For the 2009 election of the Bundestag, the Hare-Niemeyer method was replaced by the Sainte-Laguë/Schepers method. For the first time, parties could no longer nominate candidates who were members of other parties. The circle of Germans living abroad who are entitled to vote was extended.

Election reform 2023 for German Bundestag (17 March 2023) The German lower house electoral system was reformed in 2023 to replace the flexible number of seats with a fixed Bundestag size of 630 seats, and to remove the 3 district seat exception to the 5% electoral threshold. The overhang seats have been replaced by a new system of proportional allocation within the fixed number of 630 seats (up to 299 of which will still be elected on a local constituency 'first past the post' basis). A party may take only as many seats as its proportion of the second vote (party vote) allows, and if it elects too many single-member-district seats, they are disallowed, and allocated to another party. Due to a ruling by the Federal Constitutional Court in 2024, the 3 district seat exception to the 5% electoral threshold will be maintained, at least temporarily, for the 2025 federal election.

== See also ==
- Elections in Germany
- Bavarian state election system
