= Overhang seat =

Phenomenon in electoral systems

Overhang seats are the seats that a party wins when it takes a larger share of the individual constituencies than its share of the nationwide votes entitles it. Under some proportional representation systems, overhang seats refer to the compensation seats that may be created to compensate for when that over-representation happens. They were first used in the mixed-member proportional (MMP) system as it originated in Germany.

== How overhang seats arise ==
Under MMP, a party is entitled to a number of seats based on its share of the total vote. If a party's share entitles it to ten seats and its candidates win in seven constituencies, it is awarded three list seats, bringing it up to its required number, if the number of top-up seats allows. This "top-up" only happens if the party's seat entitlement is greater than the number of constituency seats it has won.

If, for example, a party is entitled to five seats but wins in six constituencies, the sixth constituency seat is referred to as an overhang seat. Overhang typically results from the winner-take-all tendency of single-member districts, or if the geographic distribution of a party allows it to win many seats with few votes.

== Earning overhang seats ==
The two mechanisms that produce overhang seats for a party are:

1. winning many constituencies;
2. winning the same number of seats but with fewer party votes. Therefore the party is proportionally entitled to fewer seats.

In many countries, overhang seats are rare – a party that wins constituency seats generally wins a significant portion of the party vote as well.

There are, however, some circumstances in which overhang seats may arise relatively easily:

- Few major parties, large number of minor parties – When there are only one or two major parties, but a relatively large number of minor parties that, combined, achieve a significant share of the total proportional vote, but fail to win any constituency seats, the large parties often end up with overhang seats.
- Similar lead across constituencies – If one party wins all or most constituencies of a relevant area with a rather low margin, it would be more prone to overhang mandates than if different parties lead in different constituencies, with the same overall share of each of the parties. As such, if there is less difference between constituencies, overhang seats are more probable.
- Unevenly sized constituencies – Candidates that win small constituencies by a narrow margin do not generate enough votes to justify their full seats under a proportional system.
- Low turnout in some constituencies – This has the same effect as small constituencies. Furthermore, turnout and party preferences may be highly correlated, e.g. rural vs. urban areas.
- Small number of top-up seats to be allocated – The more numerous the constituencies, the more likely it is that the different causes of overhang seats will balance out between parties. and sometimes overhang is addressed at the state level. E.g., in the German federal Bundestag election in 2013, some compensation happened through for party's state lists instead of at the federal level only.
- Individual candidates with strong local followings – Sometimes, a particular politician will have strong support in their own constituency, but will belong to a party with very low support, even in their own area. The candidate will be elected based on their own qualities, but the party they belong to will not receive enough votes to justify the candidate's seat. In the case of independent candidates, this is usually guaranteed – they have no party at all, and so obviously cannot win votes under MMP's party-list proportional representation. However, some countries, such as New Zealand, have special rules dealing with independents – seats won by these candidates are exempted from the proportional system altogether.
- Regional parties – Parties based in a particular region may win a substantial number of constituency seats in that region without necessarily gaining a large share of the national vote. Parties focused on particular ethnic or religious minorities may also come under this category, particularly if seats are reserved for these groups.
- Tactical voting – Voters in countries that can cast a vote in the list vote and cast a local vote (such as Germany) may decide not to vote for a local candidate that has little chance of winning but still support that party on the list vote. Parties that win many local seats but attract a reduced list vote may receive an overhang as a result.
- Decoy parties – Party labels in the constituencies can be deliberately mismatched with those in the proportional vote in an attempt to induce tactical voting. In Italy in 2001, two lists won a significant majority of the total number of first-past-the post seats, despite winning almost none of the proportional vote. The system, nicknamed scorporo, was not a type of additional member system in which overhangs could occur, it resulted in a significant distortion to the desired compensatory nature.

Also overhang seats may go unaddressed, thus producing a disproportional chamber in the end. This can happen when there are many constituencies compared with the total number of seats – If many seats are used for constituencies, the relatively-few top-up seats are less able to ensure strict proportionality.

== Dealing with overhang seats ==
Overhang seats are dealt with in different ways by different systems. in some systems the overhang is not addressed at all. In others the under-represented parties are given more seats through use of additional top-up seats, thus increasing the total number of seats. In others, a party who wins too many district seats is denied those seats.

=== Leaving the overhang seats as is ===
A party is allowed to keep any overhang seats it wins, and the corresponding number of list seats allocated to other parties is eliminated to maintain the number of assembly seats. This means that a party with overhang seats has more seats than its entitlement, and other parties have fewer. This approach is used in the Chamber of Deputies of Bolivia and the National Assembly of Lesotho. It was unsuccessfully recommended by the 2006 Ontario Citizens' Assembly on Electoral Reform for adoption by the Legislative Assembly of Ontario, and the proposed Dual-member proportional representation system uses this approach as well. While for the first additional list seats are simply denied to parties, in the latter three cases, a fairer procedure was proposed of subtracting the constituency seats won by parties with overhang seats from the total number of seats and recalculating the quota (the largest remainder method was also recommended) to proportionally redistribute the list seats to the other parties.

Some systems allocate top-up in such as way as to mathematically adjust for overhang. In the Scottish Parliament, Welsh Senedd (until 2021) and London Assembly, the effect is similar, but the mechanism different. In the allocation of second vote list seats using a highest averages method, the first vote constituency seats already won are taken into account when calculating party averages, with the aim of making the overall result proportional. If a party wins more seats in the first vote than its proportion of second votes would suggest it should win overall, or if an independent candidate wins a constituency seat, then the automatic effect is to reduce the overall number of seats won by other parties below what they might expect proportionally.

=== Compensating the overhang ===
Sometimes a party is allowed to keep any overhang seats it wins, but other parties are still awarded the same number of seats that they are entitled to, through creation of overhang-compensation top-up seats. This means that a party with overhang seats has more seats than its proportional entitlement but this is at least partially annulled through the other parties getting more seats. The New Zealand Parliament uses this system; one extra seat was added in the 2005 election and 2011 election, two were added in the 2008 election, and approximately eleven were added in the 2026 election. This system was also used in the German Bundestag until 2013.

Other parties may be given additional list seats (sometimes called "balance seats" or leveling seats) lest they be disadvantaged. This preserves the same ratio between parties as was established in the election. It also increases the number of members in the legislature, as overhang-compensation seats are added. Extra list seats may not be enough to counteract the overhang. The result of this system is less proportional than full compensation, as the party with the overhang is still receiving a "bonus" above its proportional entitlement. After the Federal Constitutional Court of Germany ruled in 2008 that allowing uncompensated overhang seats was unconstitutional (because in rare instances, it allowed votes to negatively affect the number of seats for a given party, contradicting the voter's will), leveling seats were introduced for the 2013 election and also used in those of 2017 and 2021.

=== Non-awarding of overhang seats ===
A party is not allowed to keep any overhang seats it wins, with the number of district elections being reduced until the party's district wins fits the party's entitlement. This method raises the question of which constituency seats the party is not allowed to keep. After that is determined, it needs to be decided who will represent these constituencies. This was used in the Landtag of Bavaria until 1966, with the party candidates with the fewest votes not keeping the constituency seat.

The system is now also in place at the federal level in Germany, having commenced with the 2025 German federal election. As with the previous system in Bavaria, a party with overhang excludes its constituency winners in order of smallest vote share in the respective district.

== Constitutionality ==
Prior to German reunification, overhang mandates – particularly at the federal level – were relatively rare and never amounted to more than five (out of over 400 total seats) in any given Bundestag and several federal elections resulted in no overhang at all. This was in part due to the relative strength of the two major parties, CDU/CSU and SPD; with both parties winning large shares of the vote in the pre-reunification three-party system, it was rare for either to win more than a handful of overhanging constituencies.

However, this began to change as East Germany started participating in German federal elections starting with the 1990 German federal election, with the PDS posting particularly strong results in those states. This, along with the rise of Alliance '90/The Greens, served to depress the party-list vote shares, creating more overhang seats than in prior elections.

In the 1994 German federal election, the re-elected Kohl government supported by a "black-yellow" coalition (CDU/CSU and FDP) achieved a relatively slim majority of 341 out of 672 seats to the opposition's (SPD, Alliance 90/The Greens, PDS) 331 seats at the opening session. This majority would have been even narrower if not for twelve overhang seats the CDU/CSU had achieved, which were however partially mitigated by the four overhang seats for the SPD. This led to much more public debate on the existence of overhang seats and what to do about them. There was even a challenge of the validity of the election result based on the overhang seat issue raised by a private citizen after the 1994 election, which was however dismissed as "obviously without merit".

The problem thus turning from a theoretical consideration to a real issue, the German Constitutional Court as early as 1997 ruled that a "substantial number" of overhang mandates which weren't equalized through leveling seats were unconstitutional. The issue became more pressing after a particularly notorious case of negative vote weight at the 2005 election. The election in the Dresden I constituency was held two weeks later than the other 298 constituencies after the death of a candidate. Der Spiegel published an article in the intervening time outlining how more votes for the CDU could lead to them losing an overhang seat, and thus narrowing their plurality in the close election. The anticipated tactical voting in Dresden I did occur as Andreas Lämmel (CDU) won the constituency with roughly 37% of the constituency vote while his party won only 24.4% of the party-list vote, with the FDP receiving 16.6% – more than one and a half times their federal vote share of 9.8%.

This led to another ruling by the German Constitutional Court in 2008 which ruled that the existing federal electoral law was unconstitutional in part as it violated the principle of one person one vote and produced an overly opaque relationship between the numbers of votes cast and seats in parliament. However, the Court also allowed for a three year deadline to change the electoral law, allowing for the 2009 German federal election to be held under the previous set of rules.

The electoral reform passed with the votes of the governing "black-yellow" coalition in late 2011 (a few weeks after the deadline set in 2008) – and without consulting the opposition parties – was again ruled unconstitutional by the Constitutional Court. Furthermore, the Court clarified that the federal electoral system was supposed to be primarily one of proportional representation and a number of non-compensated overhang seats above 15 would "dilute" this proportional character.

As the Bundestag thus lacked a constitutional electoral mechanism and the 2013 German federal election was coming up, the government agreed to negotiations with the opposition parties, leading to a new electoral law being passed in early 2013 with broad support from all parties in the Bundestag except Die Linke. This added leveling seats and was used in the 2013, 2017 and 2021 elections.

On the state level, an unclear wording in the state electoral law of Schleswig-Holstein led to different possible assignments of leveling seats to equalize the overhang seats ultimately resulting in the 2009 Schleswig-Holstein state election giving a majority of seats to the Peter Harry Carstensen led "black-yellow" coalition, despite them having won a lower share of the vote than the SPD, Greens, Left, SSW opposition. Following a suit before the State Constitutional Court brought by opposition parties, it was ruled that the electoral law in its then current interpretation did indeed violate the state constitution but that the Landtag was to keep its composition until a new electoral law could be passed (which happened in 2011) after which new elections would be scheduled with enough time for campaigns setting the next election for 2012, two years earlier than if the Landtag had served its full five year term.

The 2023 reform which eliminated the awarding of all overhang and leveling seats was also subject to a constitutional challenge. The Federal Constitutional Court upheld this part of the law.

== Examples ==
=== Germany ===
In the system used in Germany until the 2025 election, every constituency seat won by any party or an independent is granted, while the electoral system requires that a party needs 5% of the party-list vote to win list seats. If a party wins at least three constituency seats, it is granted full proportional representation as if it passed the 5% electoral threshold, even if it did not. The awarding of overhang seats and the leveling seats required to compensate for this led to a drastic increase in the size of the Bundestag beyond its normal size of 598 members.

In the 2021 federal election, The Left fell just short of the election threshold with 4.9% of the national vote but won three single-member constituency seats. This entitled them to proportional representation in the Bundestag according to their second votes. The extra compensation seats for other parties meant that the Bundestag would be the largest in German history, and in fact the largest freely elected parliament in the world, with 736 MdBs.

In 2023, in response to the increasing size of the Bundestag, the Scholz cabinet passed a reform law to fix the size of future Bundestags at 630 members beginning with the 2025 election. This is achieved by eliminating all overhang and leveling seats. A party's total number of seats will be determined solely by its share of party-list votes (Zweitstimmendeckung, "second vote coverage"). If a party wins overhanging constituency seats in a state, its constituency winners in excess of its share of seats would be excluded from the Bundestag in order of those that received the smallest vote shares. The rule allowing any party winning three constituency seats to receive full proportional representation was originally also abolished. The Federal Constitutional Court, however, decided that a 5% electoral threshold with no exceptions was unconstitutional and the rule was restored on an interim basis for the 2025 election.

=== New Zealand ===
In New Zealand, all members elected for constituencies (electorates) keep their seats, and electorate seats are approximately 60% of Parliament, allowing high potential for overhangs. From the introduction of MMP in 1996 to 2023, Parliament ranged from the standard 120 to 123 seats, with Te Pāti Māori the most common beneficiaries of overhangs. The 2026 election returned approximately 131 seats due to low party votes for the two largest parties, uneven performance by parties in electorate votes, and prominent strategies aimed at engineering overhangs on both sides of the political spectrum.

In 2012 and 2023, parliamentary commissions proposed ending overhang provisions. The commissions did not specifically anticipate 2026's circumstances or propose reducing the ratio of electorate to party list seats or how electorate seats are elected. They proposed ending overhangs as a necessary part of a "package" of changes (similar packages for each commission). Alongside slightly reducing the party vote threshold (from 5% to 4% or 3.5% respectively), the commissions proposed abolishing the electorate seat threshold whereby parties winning an electorate seat would qualify for their due share of seats from the party vote. Ending this electorate seat threshold would mean any electorate seats by parties not meeting the party vote threshold would become overhang seats, thus increasing the scope for overhangs. They instead proposed that any party's electorate seat entitlements exceeding their party vote share would reduce the list seats available to other parties, a reduction of proportionality that they considered alongside other priorities. The commissions modelled their combined proposals against previous election results and found proportionality would have been similar or improved.

No changes were made after the reviews. The 2026 election campaign and result saw increased calls for changes to the system.

== See also ==
- Underhang seat
