= 1949 West German presidential election =

- 12 September 1949
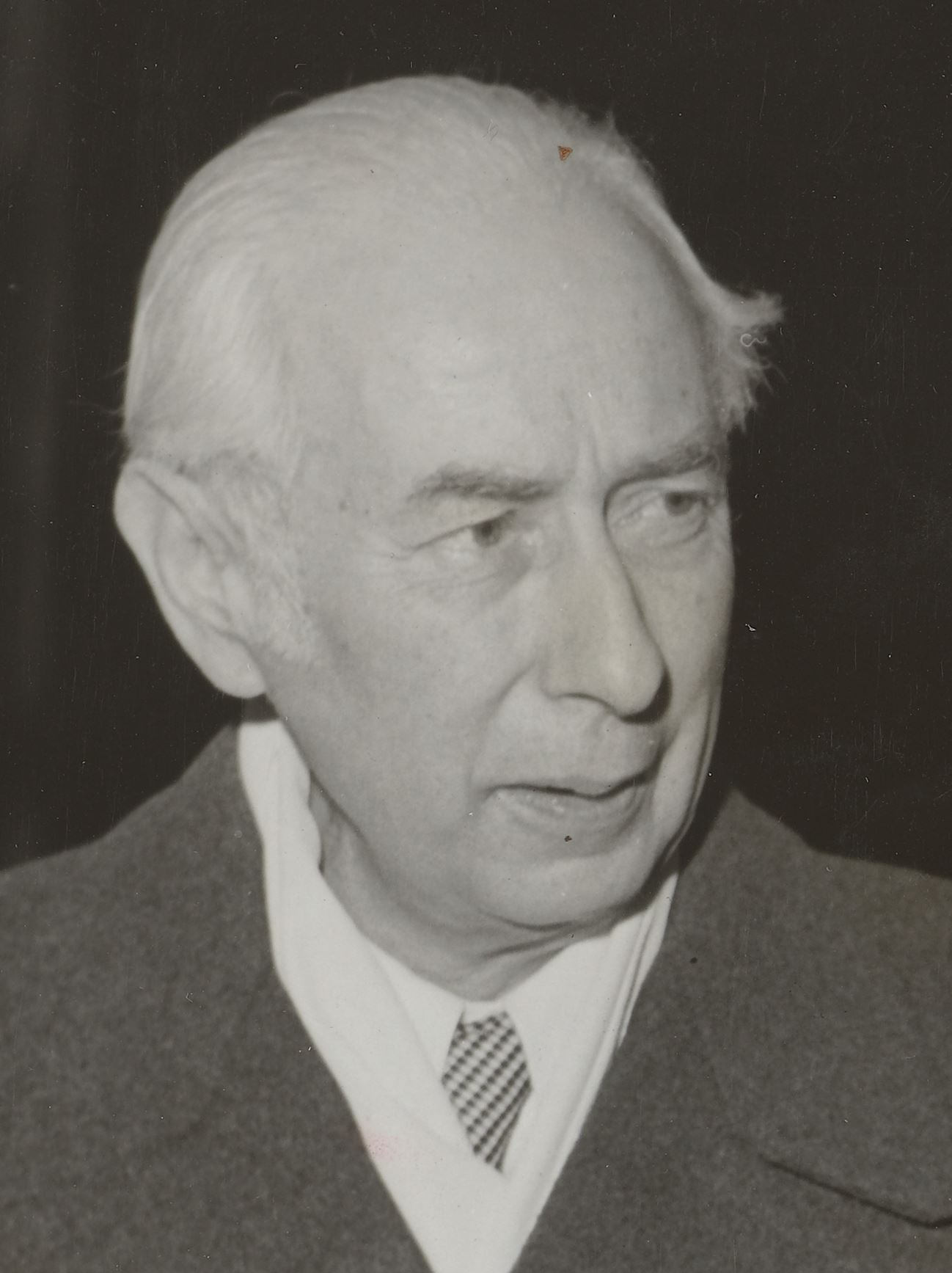

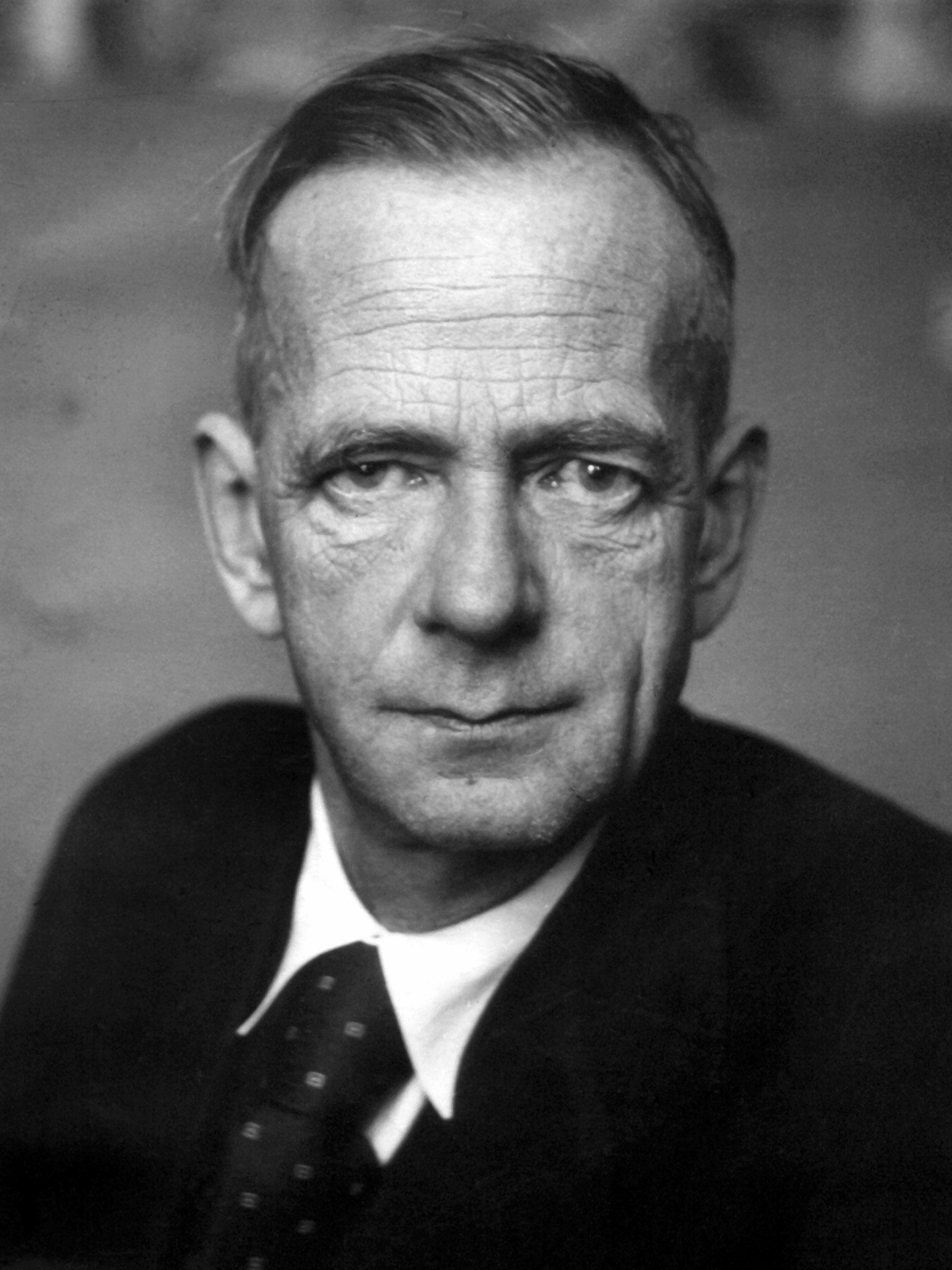

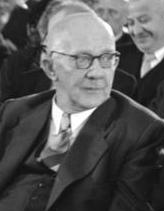
Nominee	Theodor Heuss	Kurt Schumacher	Rudolf Amelunxen
Party	FDP (supported by): CDU/CSU, DP	SPD	Centre
Electoral vote	377 (1st round); 416 (2nd round)	311 (1st round); 312 (2nd round)	28 (1st round); 30 (2nd round)
Percentage	51.7%	38.8	3.7
President before election
Karl Dönitz (as President of the German Reich at the end of World War II)
NSDAP
Elected President
Theodor Heuss
FDP

An indirect presidential election (officially the 1st Federal Convention, Bundesversammlung) was held on 12 September 1949 by the Federal Convention which is composed of all members of the Bundestag plus an equal number of delegates selected by the state legislatures which had been elected earlier. Thus 820 voters assembled in the Bundeshaus in Bonn, but only the votes of 804 (West)Germans counted, (West)Berlin delegates were only advisory.

The first Bundestag had been elected on 14 August 1949, and had convened on 7 September. The CDU/CSU, led by future chancellor Konrad Adenauer, formed a federal government coalition that included FDP, and German Party (DP). These parties agreed on supporting FDP leader Theodor Heuss as candidate for the first federal president of West Germany. As they only had about 395 votes altogether, they needed at least 8 votes from the several dozen members of other parties. Heuss got elected in the second round.

Adenauer was elected three days later when the Bundestag convened again, and was accordingly appointed by the President on 20 September 1949, together with his First Adenauer cabinet. Thus, the Federal Republic of Germany had established itself as far as the Allied occupation statute permitted.

== Background ==
Under the 1949 Basic Law, the new office of the Federal President was given substantially reduced powers when compared with the preceding office of Reich President, which was subject to the abuse of emergency powers under Nazi Germany.

This was the first German presidential election in post-war Germany and the second indirect election since 1919 that elected Social Democrat Friedrich Ebert as Germany's first (Reichs)President. Later Reichs-Presidents were elected directly.

The term of a President lasts 5 years, with one possible consecutive re-election, while the Bundestag is elected for 4 years.

== Members ==
Party	Number		
Party	Federal	States	Total
CDU/CSU	140 + (2)	140 + (2)	280 + (4)
SPD	131 + (5)	148 + (4)	279 + (9)
FDP	52 + (1)	35 + (2)	87 + (3)
DP	17	11	28
BP	17	17	34
Zentrum	10	11	21
KPD	15	25	40
WAV	12	12	24
German Right Party	6	–	6
SSW	1	2	3
Bremen Democrats (BDV)	–	1	1
Independents	1	–	1
Total	402 + (8)	402 + (8)	804 + (16)

== Results ==
Only three politicians had declared to stand, and were supported by major parties: Heuss (coalition, potentially 395 votes), Kurt Schumacher (SPD, 279), Rudolf Amelunxen (Zentrum, 21 Sitze). The Communist KPD had no candidate, probably abstained.

There was no prior campaign, and without prior speeches nor debate, the Convention members voted for a Write-in candidate. Not all of the coalition party votes were for Heuss, as the number of abstentions was close to 10%, and four additional names received votes in the first round, Hans Schlange-Schöningen even some the second round. Adenauer soon removed him from Germany by appointing him ambassador to London.

Heuss assumed a largely ceremonial role upon his election as Federal President in the second round. He took the oath of office in front of Bundestag and Bundesrat the same day of his election, 12 September 1949. Heuss's duties notably included the nomination of the first Federal Chancellor, Konrad Adenauer of the CDU, who took office on 15 September 1949. Heuss got elected to a second consecutive term in 1954 and was not eligible for a third.

Candidate	First Round		Second Round		Party	Supporting parties
Candidate	Voters	%	Voters	%	Party	Supporting parties
Theodor Heuss	377	46.9%	416	51.7%	FDP	FDP, CDU/CSU, DP
Kurt Schumacher	311	38.7%	312	38.8%	SPD	
Rudolf Amelunxen	28	3.5%	30	3.7%	Zentrum	
Hans Schlange-Schöningen	6	0.7%	2	0.2%	CDU	
Karl Arnold	1	0.1%			CDU	
Josef Müller	1	0.1%			CSU	
Alfred Loritz	1	0.1%			WAV	
Valid votes	725	100%	760	100%		
Abstention	76	9.5%	37	4.6%		
Invalid	2	0.2%	3	0.4%		
Total votes	803	100%	800	100%		
