= 1946 Bavarian state election =

The term 1946 Bavarian state election may refer to:

- June 1946 Bavarian state election – 30 June
- December 1946 Bavarian state election – 1 December
