= Max Kuß =

German politician

Max Kuß was a German politician. He was born in Frankfurt (Oder) on October 21, 1903.

At the time after the end of the Second World War he was the chairman of the KPD branch in Coburg. He was elected to the Bavarian Constituent State Assembly in the June 1946 Bavarian state election, standing as a KPD candidate in the Upper Franconia/Middle Franconia constituency. The KPD fielded Kuß again as a candidate in the December 1946 Bavarian state election.

Max Kuß died in Coburg on May 1, 1976.
