= Fritz Rössler =

German politician (1912–1987)

Fritz Rössler (17 January 1912 – 11 October 1987) was a low-level official in the Nazi Party who went on to become a leading figure in German neo-Nazi politics. In his later life he was more commonly known as Dr. Franz Richter.

== Nazi activity ==
Rössler was born in Bad Gottleuba-Berggießhübel, Saxony. After attending university in Dresden (where he did not complete a degree), Rössler became a Nazi on 1 October 1930 (No. 319,948) and soon became a technical adviser to the Gau of Saxony where he specialized in plans for resettlement of the East. By the end of World War II, Rössler was heading up the main office of the Ministry of Public Enlightenment and Propaganda before fleeing the Eastern Front to Saarland.

On 30 May 1936, he married Ruth Rößler, née von Schönberg-Pötting at the Gottleuba registry office.

== Dr. Franz Richter ==
As the war came to an end, Rössler was initially considered missing. In 1946, he resurfaced near Hanover and claimed to be Dr. Franz Richter, a Sudeten German teacher. He soon entered the Lower Saxon school service, becoming an elementary school teacher in Idensen (since 1974 part of the city of Wunstorf) on 2 April 1946, and in Luthe (also part of Wunstorf since 1974) on 5 October 1946. Wanting to remarry his wife, on 21 October 1946, he claimed under oath at the registry office in the small town of Luthe (since 1974 part of the city of Wunstorf) to have witnessed the death of Hauptmann Dr. jur. Fritz Rößler. He claimed to be Dr. Franz Richter, born 6 June 1911 in Smyrna (İzmir) in Ottoman Empire, studied philology in Prague, served as a student councilor (Studienrat), soldier from 1940–1945, not a former member of NSDAP, single, wanted to marry Rössler's widow and adopt the children. He made up the story, as it would have been impossible to verify, knowing that the records office in İzmir had burned down during the September 1922 fire, and most of the files of the German administration in the Sudetenland had also been destroyed shortly before the end of the Second World War. The ruse was accepted, and Rössler was able to remarry his wife on 7 November 1946 under his new name, while their children kept his old name.

On 20 May 1949, he was fired from his position in 1949 for teaching the Stab-in-the-back legend, and soon joined the Deutsche Rechtspartei and its successor the Deutsche Reichspartei, with the support of Sudetendeutsche Landsmannschaft. On 28 August 1949, he prevailed against Adolf von Thadden as the new DKP-DRP state chairman in Lower Saxony and also became a member of the federal executive committee. As early as 1949, he campaigned for a general amnesty for all Nazi crimes. Bearing a passing resemblance to Adolf Hitler due to his toothbrush moustache and habit of wearing Jodhpurs and jackboots, he was elected to the Bundestag in the 1949 election, but was expelled from the party the following year due to his radical Nazi ideals and his habit of attending parliament drunk.

Along with a number of other expellees from the DRP, he was a founder member of the Socialist Reich Party, which called for a restoration of Germany's historic borders and "National-Socialist fundamental principles". Continuing to sit in the Bundestag, he made a notoriously anti-Semitic speech on 15 November 1951 and was arrested soon afterwards for forging documents. In the course of investigations it was uncovered that Dr. Franz Richter was in fact Fritz Rössler, and he was sentenced to 18 months in prison for the forgery, on top of a three-month sentence for insulting Lower Saxon ministers and breaching electoral regulations.

As Richter he also built up a close relationship with the British Union Movement, distributing Mosleyite literature across Germany, whilst also establishing the All German Representations "pen club" to arrange contacts between British activists and German followers of Europe a Nation.

== Later years ==
Involved with the European Social Movement, Rössler was expelled from the SRP before it was banned, and after his release from prison he moved to Cairo, where a number of neo-Nazis operatives were based, and adopted the name Achmed Rössler. He returned to Germany in 1966 and became a businessman in Essen. He died at age 75 in Radstadt, Austria.
