= Socialist Reich Party =

1949–1952 political party in West Germany

Socialist Reich Party Sozialistische Reichspartei Deutschlands
- Abbreviation: SRP
- Leader: Otto Ernst Remer; Fritz Dorls; Gerhard Krüger
- Founded: 2 October 1949
- Banned: 23 October 1952
- Split from: German Right Party
- Merged into: Deutsche Reichspartei
- Youth wing: Reichsjugend
- Paramilitary wing: Reichsfront
- Membership: approx. 10,300 (1951 est.)
- Ideology: Neo-Nazism
- Political position: Far-right
- Colours: Red Black

Party flag

The Socialist Reich Party (German: Sozialistische Reichspartei Deutschlands) was a West German political party founded in the aftermath of World War II in 1949 as an openly neo-Nazi-oriented splinter from the national conservative German Right Party (DKP-DRP). The SRP achieved some electoral success in northwestern Germany (Lower Saxony and Bremen), before becoming the first political party to be banned by the Federal Constitutional Court in 1952. They were allied with the French organization led by René Binet known as the New European Order.

== History ==
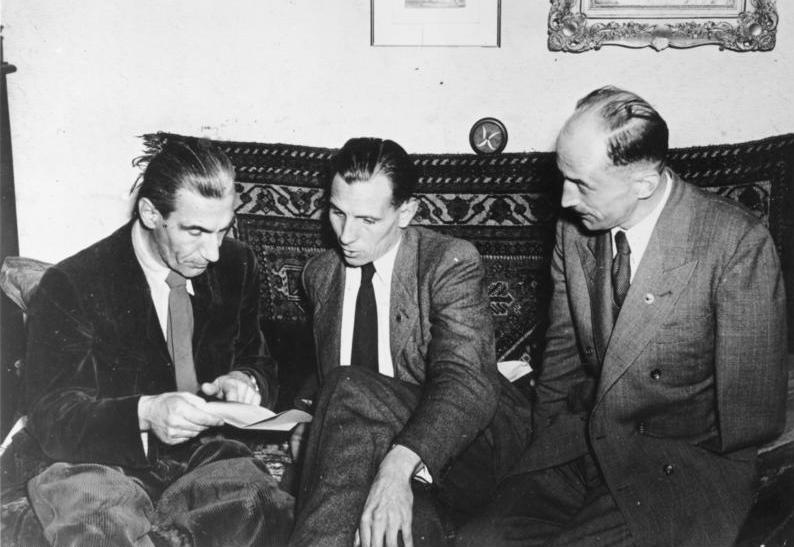
SRP leaders (left to right): Dorls, former Generalmajor Remer, and Wolf von Westarp in August 1952

The Socialist Reich Party (SRP) was formed on 2 October 1949 in Hameln by Otto Ernst Remer, Fritz Dorls, and Gerhard Krüger after they had been excluded from the DKP-DRP. The SRP saw itself as a legitimate heir of the Nazi Party; most party adherents were former NSDAP members. Its foundation was backed by former Luftwaffe Oberst Hans-Ulrich Rudel.

Krüger was a member of the SA and holder of a Golden Party Badge while Remer helped suppress the 20 July plot.

The SRP had organisations similar to those operated by the Nazis such as the paramilitary Reichsfront led by Remer, Reichsjugend youth wing (Hitler Youth), and Frauenbund (National Socialist Women's League).

FR-Briefe was a private party newsletter that operated in the SRP's early days. Deutsche Reichszeitung, later renamed Deutsche Wacht, was acquired for the party's weekly newspaper in March 1950.

Dorls had been elected to the Bundestag in the 1949 election as a member of the German Right Party (DRP). Fritz Rössler, another DRP deputy, joined the party. The SRP performed poorly in the 1950 elections held in Schleswig-Holstein, but received over 10% of the vote in two of the three districts it ran for in North Rhine-Westphalia. In the 1951 elections the SRP received over 400,000 votes, worth around 11% of the vote, Lower Saxony and 7.7% in Bremen. These results gave them 8 seats in the Bürgerschaft of Bremen and 16 seats in the Landtag of Lower Saxony. 12 of their deputies in Lower Saxony were former members of the Nazi Party.

The West German government requested the SRP be banned on 16 November 1951, and the Federal Constitutional Court ruled in favor of banning the party on 23 October 1952. Before the ban, Remer had compared the situation of the SRP with that of the early Christians, referred to High Commissioner John J. McCloy as "the Pontius Pilate who had caused Herod [to] crucify the SRP", and declared that "if we should be banned, we shall descend into the catacombs".

== Views ==
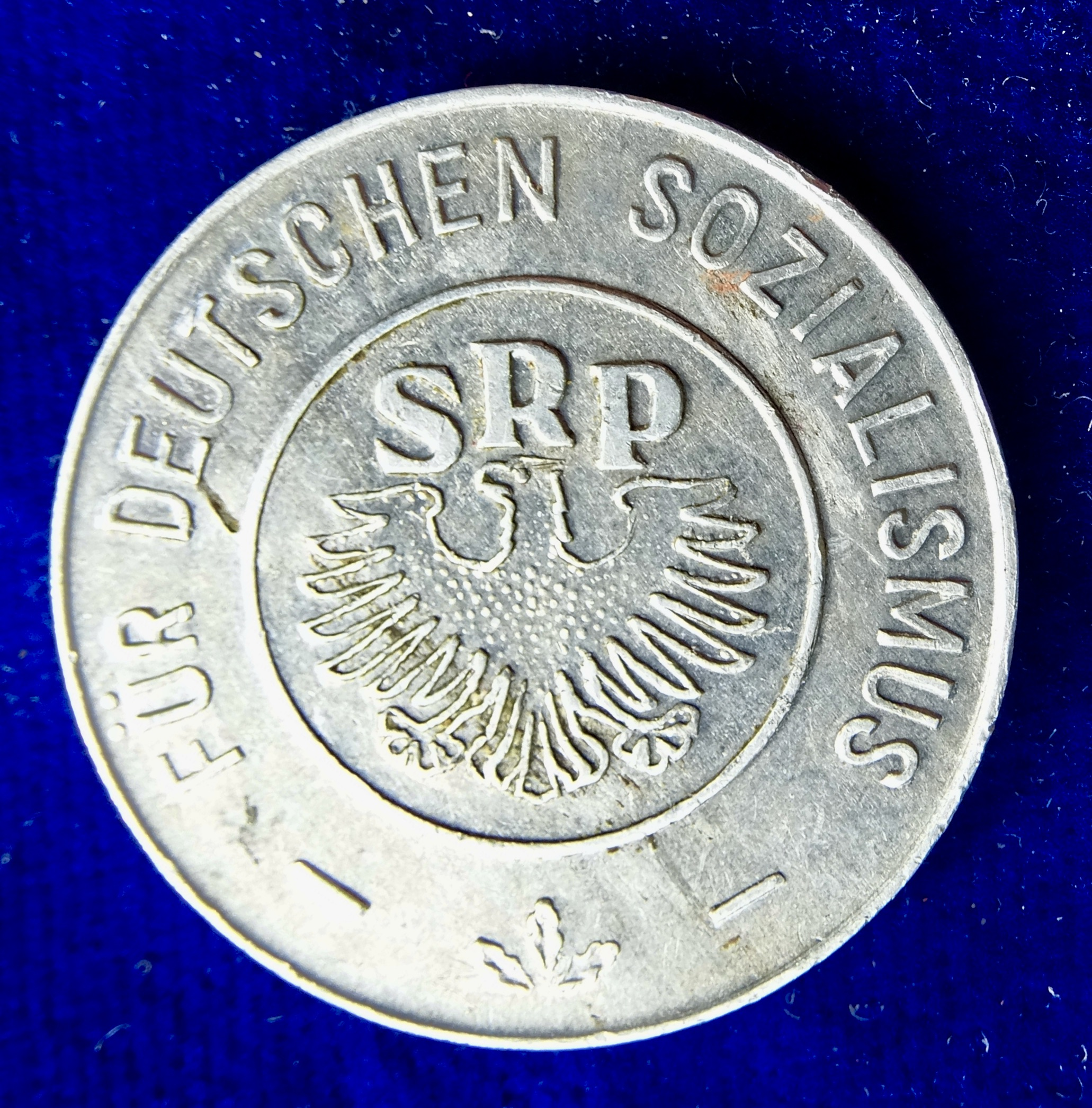
Campaign Token SRP (Sozialistische Reichspartei), obverse

The party claimed Chancellor Konrad Adenauer was an American puppet and that Grand Admiral Karl Dönitz was the last legitimate President of the German Reich, as he had been appointed by Adolf Hitler. It denied the existence of the Holocaust, claimed that the United States built the gas ovens of the Dachau concentration camp after the Second World War and that films of concentration camps were faked. The SRP also advocated Europe, led by a reunited German Reich, as a "third force" against both capitalism and communism. It demanded the re-annexation of the former eastern territories of Germany and a "solution of the Jewish question". According to Karl Dietrich Bracher, "SRP propaganda concentrated on a vague 'popular socialism' in which the old Nazis rediscovered well-worn slogans, and also on a nationalism whose championship of Reich and war was but a thinly disguised continuation of the Lebensraum ideology". The SRP also promoted the stab-in-the-back myth, structured itself in a very hierarchical manner reminiscent of the Führerprinzip, organized meetings that featured uniformed guards, and "succeeded temporarily in presenting Remer as the protector of the Third Reich against the 'traitors' of the resistance".

According to Martin A. Lee, although the SRP was anti-communist, it focused on criticizing Britain and the United States for "splitting their beloved Fatherland in two" and avoided criticism of the Soviet Union in the hope that a future deal could be made with the Soviets to reunite Germany. The SRP took the stance that Germany should remain neutral in the emerging Cold War and opposed the West German government's Atlanticist foreign policy. In case of war between the Soviet Union and the West, Remer "insisted that Germans should not fight to cover an American retreat if the Russians got the upper hand in a war", and said that he would "show the Russians the way to the Rhine" and that SRP members would "post themselves as traffic policemen, spreading their arms so that the Russians can find their way through Germany as quickly as possible". Martin A. Lee alleges that these statements attracted the attention of Soviet officials, who became willing to fund the SRP for tactical reasons. According to Lee, for a few years in the early 1950s the SRP received Soviet funds while the Communist Party of Germany did not, due to being purportedly viewed as "ineffectual". The SRP viewed Israel as an "enemy power" in its foreign policy.

One of the most significant pieces of evidence is the testimony of Otto Ernst Remer. In a 1997 interview, Remer admitted that he had received Soviet backing during his time in the party. Remer stated that he had met with KGB officials in East Berlin and had received financial and logistical support from the Soviet Union. In addition to Remer's testimony, there are other sources of evidence that support the claim that the Soviet Union supported the SRP. For example, a 1953 KGB memo outlines the agency's efforts to cultivate and support right-wing extremist groups in Germany, including the SRP. The memo states that the KGB's aim was "to create a rightist movement that will weaken the position of the United States, weaken the position of the Atlantic bloc, and encourage the German population to seek a neutralist policy". Similarly, the CIA's declassified "Family Jewels" documents reveal that the agency had evidence of Soviet funding for far-right groups in Europe, including the SRP. Historian Michael Burleigh, in his book The Third Reich: A New History, discusses the Soviet Union's alleged support for the SRP. Additionally, the Stasi Records Agency archives in Germany contain evidence of Soviet support for the SRP. The archives contain documents that show that the Stasi, the East German secret police, had frequent meetings with SRP officials and provided them with financial and logistical support.

== See also ==
- Third Position

== Works cited ==
- Coogan, Kevin (1999). Dreamer of the Day: Francis Parker Yockey and the Postwar Fascist International. Brooklyn: Autonomedia. ISBN 978-1-57027-039-0.
- Lee, Martin A. (1998). The Beast Reawakens. Warner Books.
- Long, Wellington (1968). The New Nazis of Germany. Chilton Company.
- Rosenfeld, Gavriel (2019). The Fourth Reich: The Specter of Nazism from World War II to the Present. Cambridge University Press. doi:10.1017/9781108628587. ISBN 9781108628587.
