= German Right Party =

German Conservative Party – German Right Party Deutsche Konservative Partei - Deutsche Rechtspartei
- Abbreviation: DKP-DRP
- Founded: 27 June 1946; 80 years ago
- Dissolved: 21 January 1950; 76 years ago
- Preceded by: DNVP (factions); Nazi Party (factions)
- Merged into: German Reich Party (majority); German Party (minority)
- Ideology: National conservatism Monarchism
- Political position: Far-right
- Colors: Blue

The German Right Party (German: Deutsche Rechtspartei, DRP) was a far-right political party that emerged in the British zone of Allied-occupied Germany after the Second World War.

Also known as the Deutsche Konservative Partei – Deutsche Rechtspartei (the party used both names, varying the name used between different states, but had no direct links to the pre-World War I German Conservative Party), the initially national-conservative and monarchist party formed in June 1946 through a merger of three smaller groups – the Deutsche Konservative Partei, the Deutsche Aufbaupartei of the Völkisch politician Reinhold Wulle, and the Deutsche Bauern- und Landvolk Partei. Its manifesto was in large parts authored by Hans Zehrer (1899–1966).

Originally intended as a continuation of the Weimar-era German National People's Party (DNVP) of 1918–1933, the DRP soon attracted a number of former Nazis and its programme changed towards a more neo-Nazi stance, while many moderate members left to join the German Party (DP). Ahead of the 1949 federal elections to the first Bundestag, the party attempted a fusion with DP and the Hessian Nationaldemokratische Partei (not to be confused with the current party of the same name, formed in 1964), but the British administration responded that they would refuse to grant a license to such a party, so the party instead merged with the Gemeinschaft unabhängiger Deutscher ("Association of Independent Germans", GuD) which members included former Nazis like Fritz Dorls, Gerhard Krüger and Fritz Rössler (alias Dr. Franz Richter), who became notorious for his radical positions. At the federal elections at the time, the 5% hurdle applied only to the states, not nationwide – in Schleswig-Holstein, Hamburg and NRW the party remained under 2%, but in Lower Saxony, it received 8.1% of the vote, which entitled it to five seats; its deputies were Dorls, Rössler/Richter, Adolf von Thadden, Heinz Frommhold (1906–1979) and Herwart Miessner (1911–2002). The party was the strongest in mid-sized Lower Saxonian cities, like Wilhelmshaven (31.5%), Gifhorn (30.7%), Emden (26.3%), Hameln (25.3%), Salzgitter (23.6%), Helmstedt (20.8%) and Hildesheim (17.3%). The party's strongest direct constituency was Wilhelmshaven – Friesland, where the party's candidate was former Kriegsmarine Sea Captain (Kapitän zur See) Walter Mulsow, the Wilhelmshaven fortress commander in 1945. However, with 23.7% of the vote, he came second after SPD's Johann Cramer (32.6%) and was not elected on the party list.

Despite its electoral success, the DRP was weakened that same year when the Socialist Reich Party (Sozialistische Reichspartei, SRP) formed (2 October 1949) and a number of members who supported Otto Ernst Remer and Gerhard Krüger left to join the more openly neo-Nazi party. Indeed, the group lost two of its deputies – Rössler and Fritz Dorls – to this more extreme party upon its foundation. The DRP did however gain one deputy when the Wirtschaftliche Aufbau-Vereinigung ('Economic Development Union', a group of disparate figures who supported the demagogic Munich lawyer Alfred Loritz) disintegrated in the early 1950s. Within the Bundestag, the DRP began to work closely with a number of minor groups on the far right, such as the National Democrats (a minor group that should not be confused with the later National Democratic Party of Germany). Between 1950 and 1951, the remaining DRP MPs who supported Fritz Rössler sought to merge with these groups in order to form a larger grouping, which resulted in the creation of the Deutsche Reichspartei in January 1950. Rössler had to vacate his party offices due to his contacts with SRP chairmen; he joined the Socialist Reich Party in September 1950.

Although effectively defunct, the DRP became the subject of a report produced by the Federal Constitutional Court of Germany in the context of the banning of the SRP in 1952. The report claimed that the DRP had actively tried to organize members of earlier right-wing groups, but no action ensued, as the party had ceased to exist. A few members who had not joined the Deutsche Reichspartei continued as "National Rightists" (Nationale Rechte) and finally aligned themselves with the Free Democratic Party in 1954.

== Election results ==
Bundestag composition in 1949

=== Federal parliament (Bundestag) ===
Election	Leader	Constituency		Party list		Seats	+/–	Government
Election	Leader	Votes	%	Votes	%	Seats	+/–	Government
1949				429,031	1.81 (#10)	5 / 402		Opposition

== See also ==
- Conservatism in Germany
