= Fritz Dorls =

German politician (1910-1995)

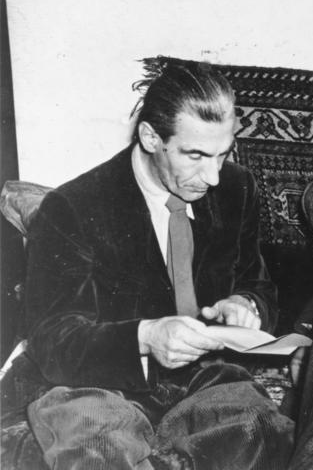
- Dorls in 1952
- Born: September 9, 1910; Brilon, German Empire
- Died: January 25, 1995 (aged 84); Opponitz, Lower Austria, Austria
- Known for: Chairman of the Socialist Reich Party
- Military career
- Allegiance: Nazi Germany
- Service number: 1. 141,822

Fritz Dorls (September 9, 1910 – January 25, 1995) was a far-right German politician and former Nazi Party member. He was chairman of the Nazi-oriented Socialist Reich Party, which was banned by the German Federal Constitutional Court in 1952.

== Early life ==
Dorls joined the Nazi Party in 1929. He claimed to have graduated from Heidelberg University with a PhD, but in 1960 the university reported no records of him having earned it. Dorls worked as a farmer and forester on his father's estate. He was also a member of the Sturmabteilung. Starting in March 1945, he taught history classes at the German Labor Front Reich School in Erwitte.

Dorls joined the Luftwaffe in 1940. He was arrested by British authorities in 1946 as he was a member of the "automatic arrest" category.

== Career ==
Dorls joined the Christian Democratic Union (CDU) after being released. and became an editor for one of its newspapers in Hannover. In 1948, he was removed from the newspaper due to his Nazi beliefs. He left the CDU to join the German Right Party (DRP) and was one of five members it elected to the Bundestag in the 1949 election.

Dorls was expelled from the DRP for allegedly contacting Otto Strasser. He formed the Socialist Reich Party (SRP) on 2 October 1949, with multiple DRP county and municipal branches joining it. In the 1951 elections the SRP received over 400,000 votes, worth around 11% of the vote, Lower Saxony and 7.7% in Bremen. The party claimed a membership of 30,000-40,000. The West German government requested the SRP be banned on 16 November 1951, and the Federal Constitutional Court ruled in favor of banning the party on 23 October 1952.

== Life after the SRP ban ==
After the SRP was banned by the German government, Dorls fled to Spain to avoid arrest. Upon his return in 1955, he was arrested. In 1957, he was sentenced to 14 months in prison for his leadership in an anti-constitutional organization, insulting Chancellor Konrad Adenauer, and fraud. He died in 1995 at the age of 84.

== Works cited ==
- Long, Wellington (1968). The New Nazis of Germany. Chilton Company.
- Rosenfeld, Gavriel (2019). The Fourth Reich: The Specter of Nazism from World War II to the Present. Cambridge University Press. doi:10.1017/9781108628587. ISBN 9781108628587.
