= Karl Wiedemann =

German politician

Karl Wiedemann (born April 18, 1904, in Augsburg) was a German politician.

As of early 1933 Wiedemann was a city councilor in Augsburg, representing the Communist Party of Germany (KPD). He was the secretary and the Bavaria gauleiter of the International Union of Victims of Wars and Labour (IBOKA), an organization mobilizing financial support for imprisoned workers and their families. After the National Socialist seizure of power, Wiedemann remained politically active. At least until July 1933, he continued to lead activities of IBOKA. Wiedemann was detained at the Dachau concentration camp. However his brother Matthias Wiedemann, gau auditor and a local NSDAP official, managed to secure his release. Karl Wiedemann was later employed in the Augsburg city administration. In December 1934 Wiedemann's typewriter and mimeograph machine were seized in a police raid.

At the end of the Second World War Wiedemann was part of the nucleus that rebuilt the KPD organization in Augsburg. In the June 1946 Bavarian state election he was elected to the Bavarian Constituent State Assembly, as a KPD candidate in the Swabia constituency. During his tenure, he served as the 4th secretary of the Presidium of the State Assembly.

Wiedemann died in Augsburg on July 16, 1981.
