= December 1946 Bavarian state election =

Post-WWII election in occupied Germany

1946 Bavarian state election
- 1 December 1946

All 180 seats in the Landtag of Bavaria 91 seats needed for a majority
- Turnout: 3,048,337 (75.7%) ▲3.6%
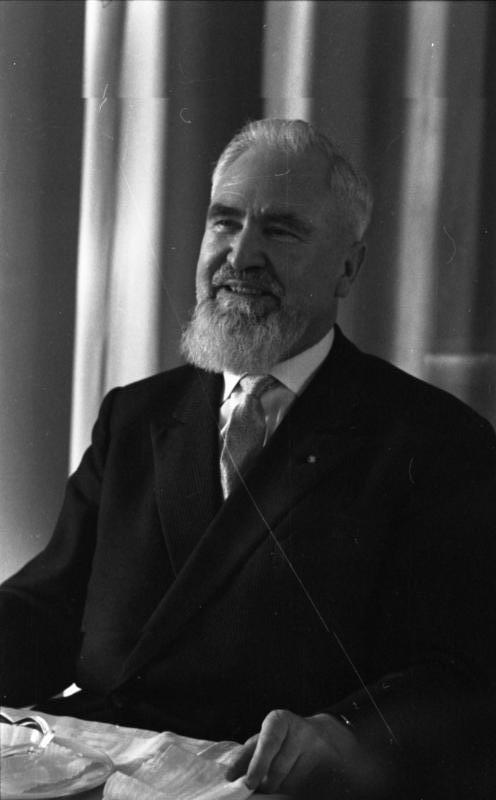

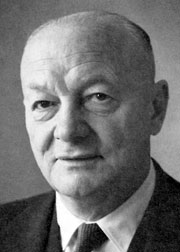

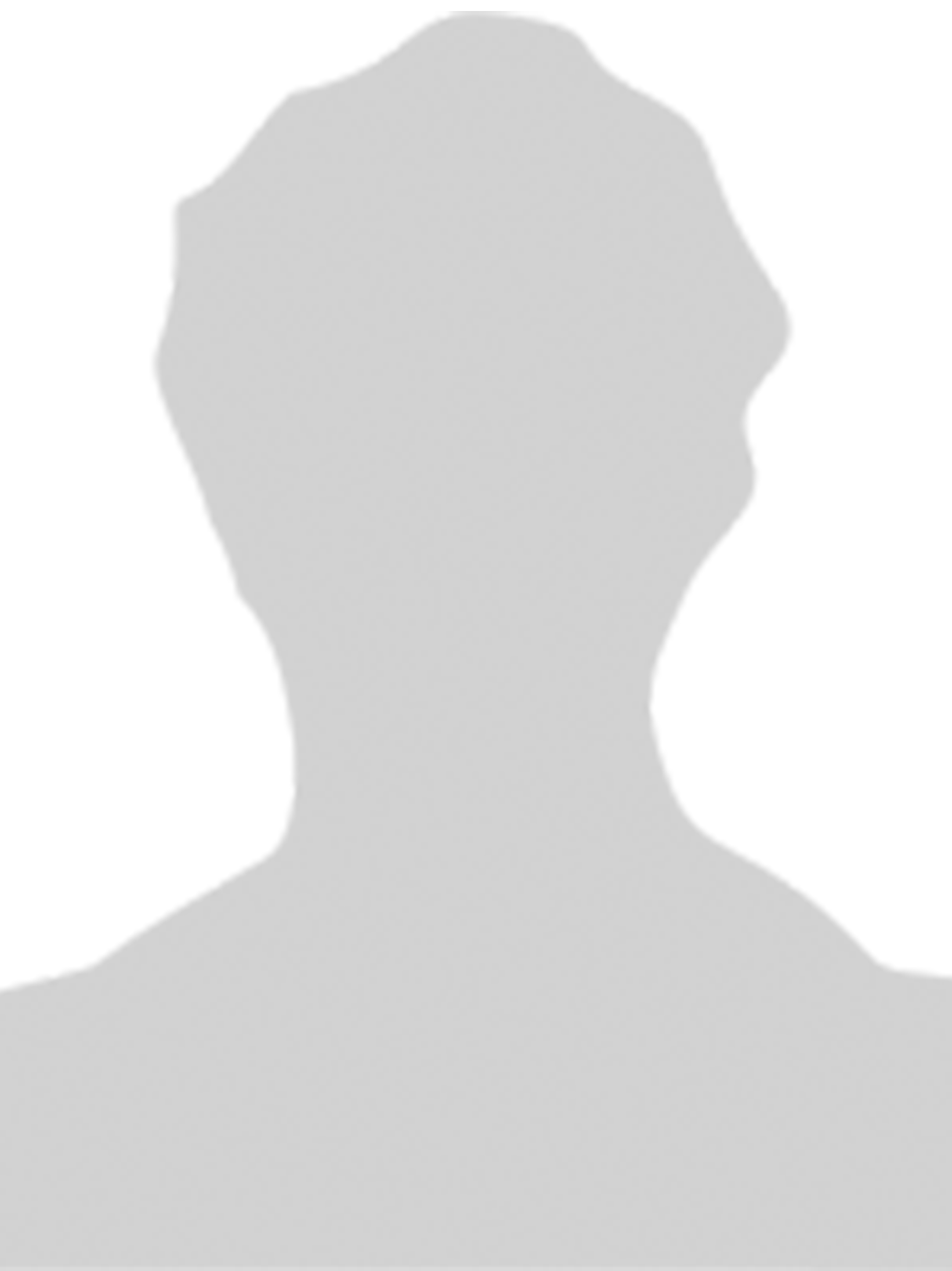

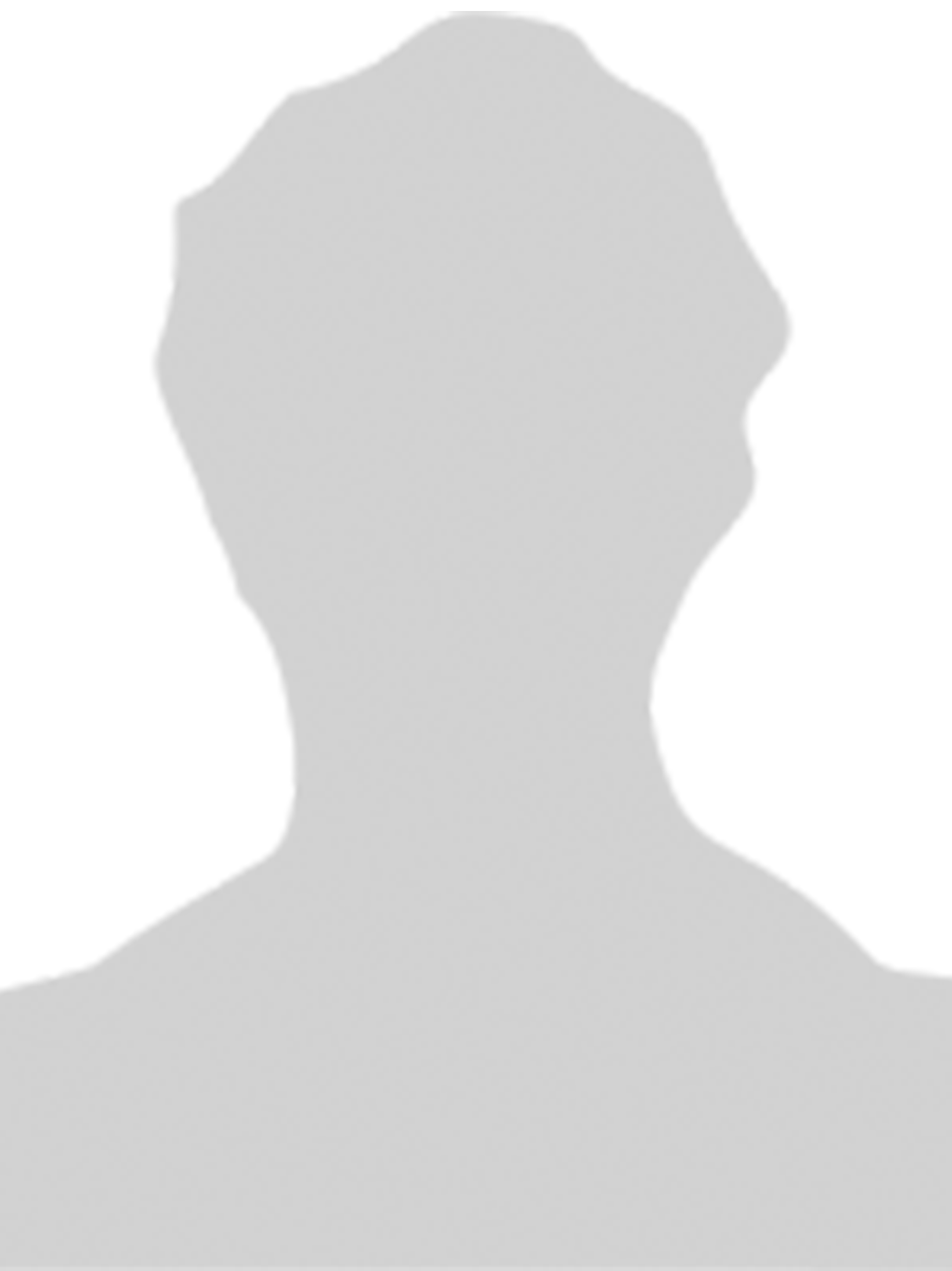

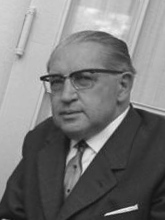
	First party	Second party	Third party
Leader	Alois Hundhammer	Jean Stock	Alfred Loritz
Party	CSU	SPD	WAV
Seats won	104	54	13
Seat change	▼5	▲3	▲5
Popular vote	1,593,908	871,760	225,404
Percentage	52.3%	28.6%	7.4%
Swing	▼6%	▼0.2%	▲2.3%
	Fourth party	Fifth party
Leader	Hermann Schirmer	Thomas Dehler
Party	KPD	FDP
Seats won	0	9
Seat change	▼9	▲6
Popular vote	185,023	172,242
Percentage	6.1%	5.7%
Swing	▲0.8%	▲3.2%
Minister-President before election
Wilhelm Hoegner
SPD
Elected Minister-President
Hans Ehard
CSU

The December 1946 Bavarian state election was held on 1 December 1946 to elect the members of the First Bavarian Landtag. The election came after the dissolution of the Bavarian Constituent Assembly after the passing of the Constitution, which stipulated that a democratically elected Landtag would elect the Minister-President. It saw Bavaria's first democratically chosen Minister-President since Heinrich Held.

The Christian Social Union in Bavaria (CSU) has been the largest party in every election of the state parliament since 1946, as of 2026.

== Background ==
Bavaria was completely occupied by American troops at the end of April 1945. General George S. Patton appointed Christian democrat Fritz Schäffer as interim Minister-President on 28 May 1945, before being dismissed by General Dwight D. Eisenhower on 28 September 1945 due to Schäffer's past anti-Semitic positions, and hiring of ex-Nazis within his administration.

The ministry was then handed over to social democrat Wilhelm Hoegner, who oversaw the creation of a new Bavarian constitution in the spring and summer of 1946. To aid him, the Advisory State Committee was formed, with its members being appointed by the political parties or the state. The body was eventually dissolved, with direct elections being called for a Constituent State Assembly to oversee the passage of the Constitution. After the Constitution had been ratified by the State Assembly, the body was dissolved and elections were called for the first official Landtag since the Weimar Republic. On the same day of the Landtag elections, Bavaria held a plebiscite whether to affirm the newly written Constitution.

== Results ==
The Wilhelm Hoegner regime had been installed by the American military forces in Germany and did not reflect the popular opinion of Bavarians. The Constitution stated that the Minister-President was to be elected by the Landtag, thus when the CSU gained a majority of the seats, the SPD entered a coalition with the CSU and WAV, with a CSU Minister-President, Hans Ehard. In September 1947, the SPD withdrew its ministers and the CSU abandoned its partnership with WAV, forming a sole majority government. This was also the first election in post-war Bavaria that introduced the ten-percent rule, in which a seat would only be allotted to a candidate if they received at least ten percent of the vote in any given constituency. The KPD, while gaining a net positive in overall votes, failed to meet this requirement in any constituency and lost all of their seats.

== Parties ==
The table below lists parties represented in the Constituent State Assembly of Bavaria.

Name		Ideology	Leader(s)	June 1946 result	
Name		Ideology	Leader(s)	Votes (%)	Seats
CSU	Christian Social Union in Bavaria; Christlich-Soziale Union in Bayern	Christian democracy	Alois Hundhammer	58.3	109 / 180
SPD	Social Democratic Party of Germany; Sozialdemokratische Partei Deutschlands	Social democracy	Jean Stock	28.8	51 / 180
KPD	Communist Party of Germany; Kommunistische Partei Deutschlands	Marxism–Leninism	Hermann Schirmer	5.3	9 / 180
WAV	Economic Reconstruction Union; Wirtschaftliche Aufbau-Vereinigung	Right-wing populism	Alfred Loritz	5.1	8 / 180
FDP	Free Democratic Party; Freie Demokratische Partei	Liberalism	Thomas Dehler	2.5	3 / 180

Summary of the 1 December 1946 election results of the Landtag of Bavaria
Party	Votes	%	+/-	Seats	+/-	Seats %
Christian Social Union (CSU)	1,593,908	52.3	▼6%	104	▼5	56.1
Social Democratic Party (SPD)	871,760	28.6	▼0.2%	54	▲3	30
Economic Reconstruction Union (WAV)	225,404	5.1	▲2.3%	13	▲5	7.2
Communist Party (KPD)	185,023	6.1	▲0.8%	0	▼9	0
Free Democratic Party (FDP)	172,242	5.7	▲3.2%	9	▲6	5
Total	3,048,337	100.0		180	±0	
Voter turnout		75.7	▲3.6			
Source: Statistik Bayern and Historisches Lexikon Bayerns

Popular Vote
CSU	52.3%
SPD	28.6%
WAV	7.4%
KPD	6.1%
FDP	5.7%

Landtag seats
CSU	56.1%
SPD	30%
WAV	7.2%
FDP	5.7%
KPD	0%
