= Constitution of Bavaria =

Principles, institutions and law of political governance in the German state of Bavaria

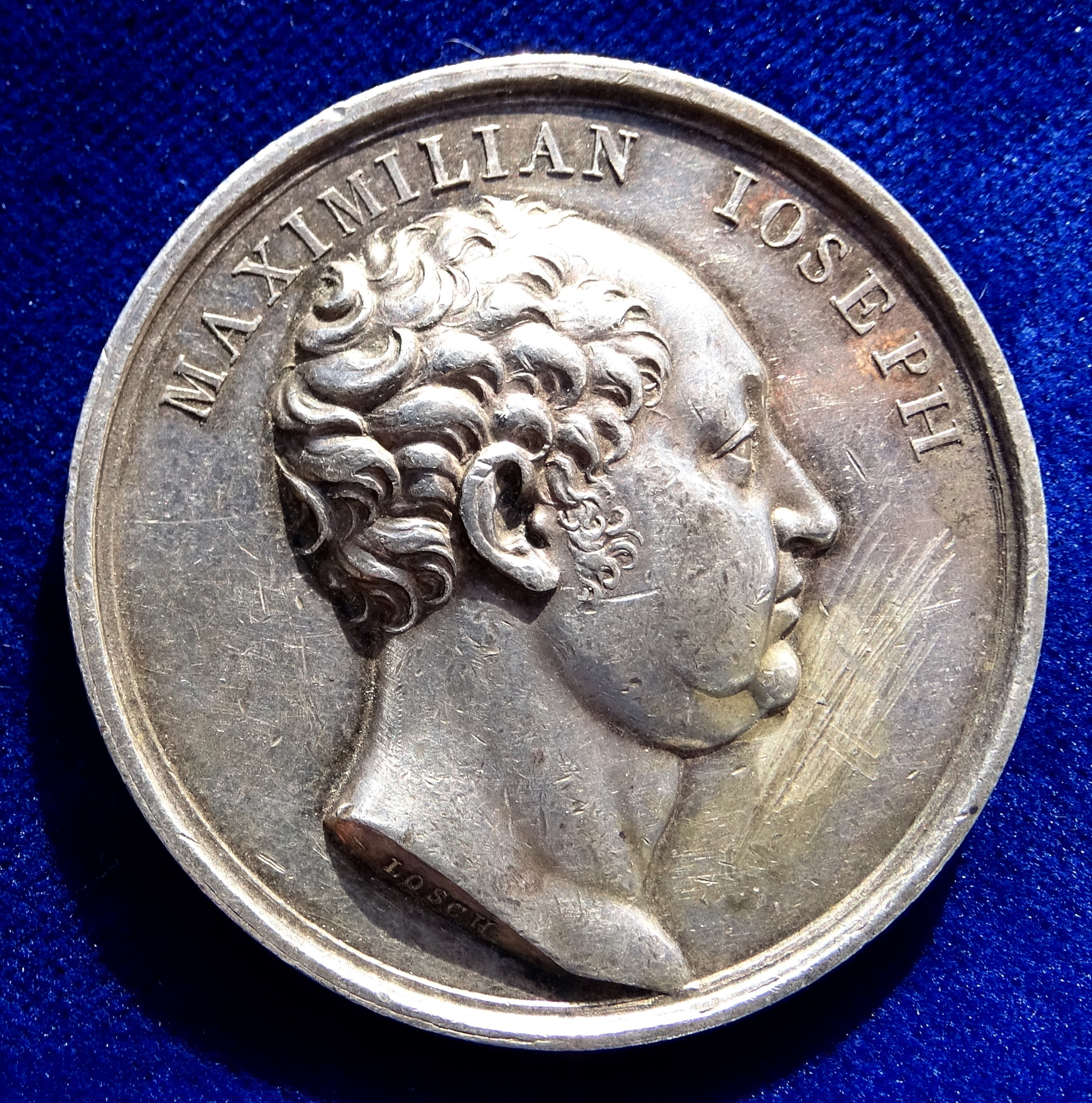
Presentation medal of the Bavarian Parliament (Bayerische Ständeversammlung) 1819 to their King Maximilian I Joseph, on the first anniversary of the constitution of 1818, obverse

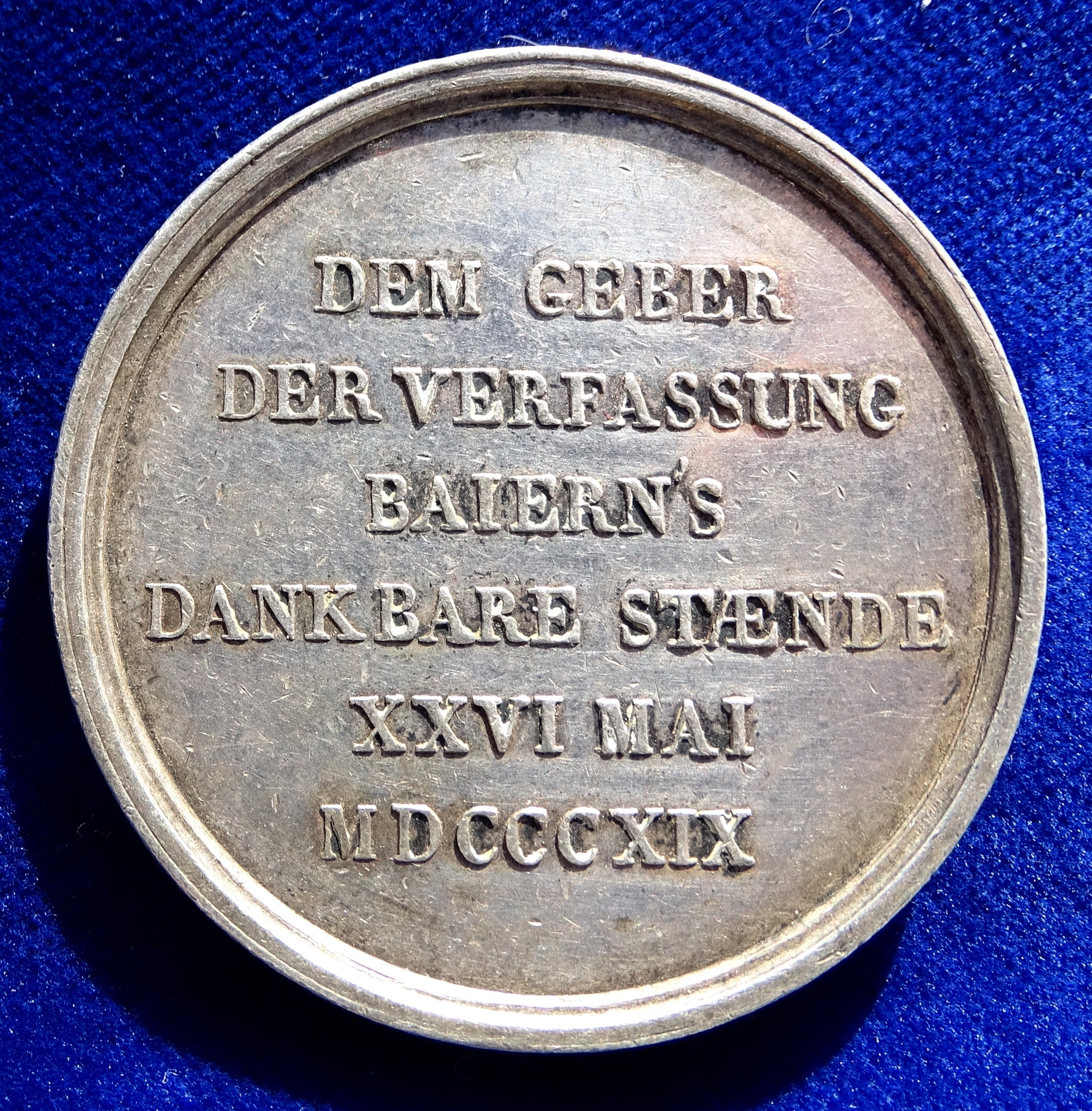
Presentation medal of the Bavarian Parliament (Bayerische Ständeversammlung) 1819 to their King Maximilian I Joseph, on the first anniversary of the constitution of 1818, reverse

The Constitution of the Free State of Bavaria was enacted on 8 December 1946. It is the fourth constitutional document in Bavarian history after the Constitution of 1808, the Constitution of the Kingdom of Bavaria in 1818 and the Bamberg Constitution of 1919.

The first state elections after the Second World War were held on 30 June 1946, when 180 members of a Constituent Assembly were chosen. The constituent assembly was tasked with drafting a new Bavarian constitution and passed a first draft for a constitution on 20 September 1946. After the American military government vetoed some provision, a final draft was passed with 136–14 votes on 26 October 1946. The new constitution was accepted by a public vote on 1 December 1946, the same day as the state election for the first Bavarian State Parliament after the 2nd World War. The constitution entered into force upon its publication in the official Bavarian government gazette on 8 December 1946.

The Constitution of the Free State of Bavaria regulates the independence of the Free State (Republic) as a Land of the Federal Republic of (Germany). The Constitution is divided into four main parts and contains a total of 188 articles. In the first three articles, it is set that Bavaria is a free state, that authority emanates from the people and that Bavaria is a legal, cultural and social state.

The Constitution can be changed only in the way of legislation (article 75). Resolutions of the Parliament to amend the Constitution must be submitted to the people for a decision.

== Preamble ==
Constitution of the Free State of Bavaria 2 December 1946 as last amended by the act of 10 November 2003

″Mindful of the physical devastation which the survivors of the 2nd World War were led into by a godless state and social order lacking in all conscience or respect for human dignity, firmly intending moreover to secure permanently for future German generations the blessing of Peace, Humanity and Law, and looking back over a thousand years and more of history, the Bavarian people hereby bestows upon itself the following Democratic Constitution.″

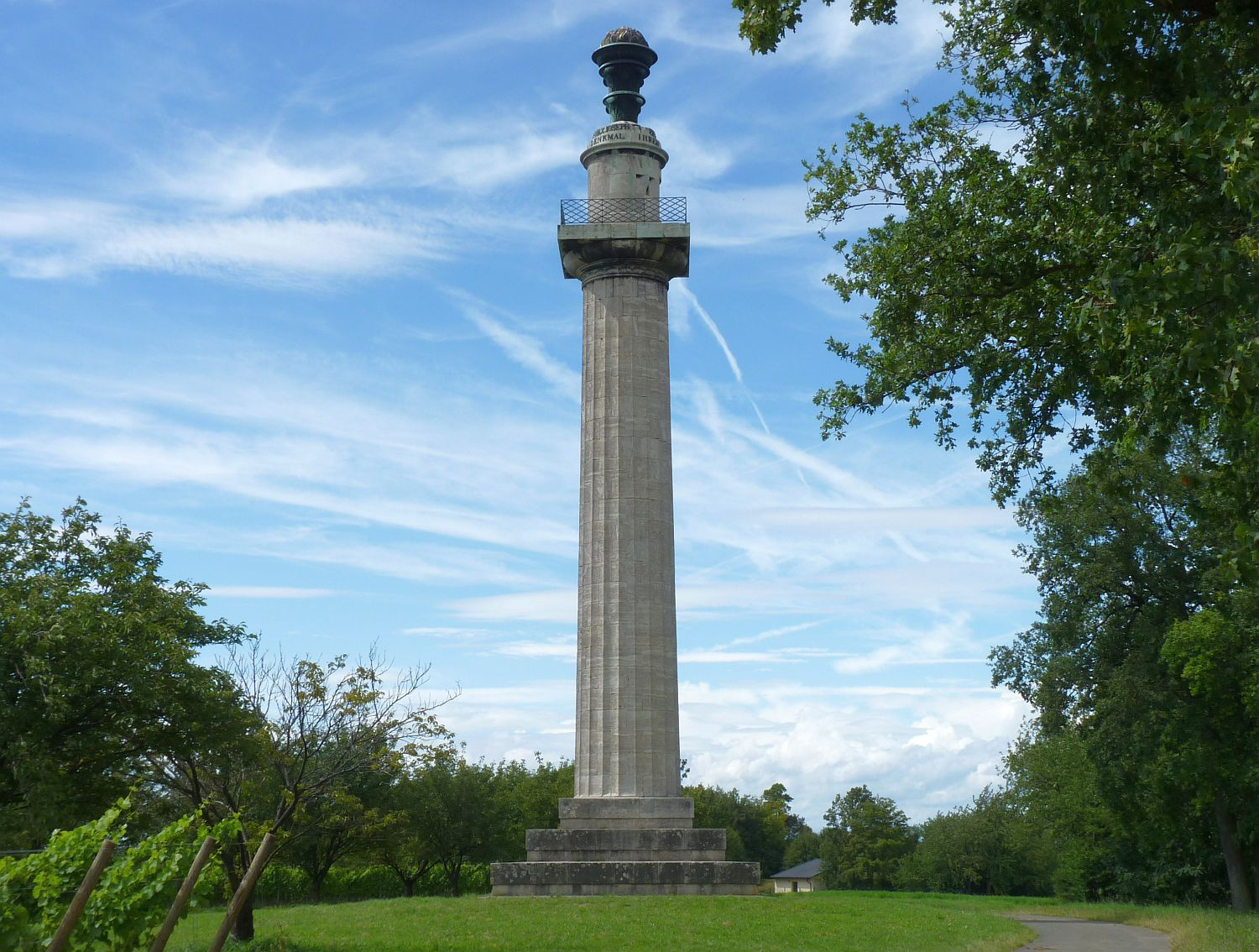
Constitution Column in memory of the Bavarian constitution of 1818, Volkach-Gaibach, Lower Franconia, Bavaria

== Article 1 Free state, Land colours, Land coat of arms ==
1. Bavaria is a free state.
2. The Land colours are white and blue.
3. The Land coat of arms shall be determined by law.

== Article 2 People's state ==
1. Bavaria is a people's state. The power of the state emanates from the people.
2. The people shall express their will through elections and votes. Decisions shall be arrived at by majority votes.

== Article 3 Law, Culture and social state ==
1. Bavaria is a legal, cultural and social state. It shall be dedicated to the common well-being.
2. The state shall protect the natural basis of life and cultural traditions.
