= June 1946 Bavarian state election =

Post-WWII election in occupied Germany

1946 Bavarian state election
- 30 June 1946

All 180 seats in the Bavarian Constituent Assembly 91 seats needed for a majority
- Turnout: 3,048,337 (72.1%)
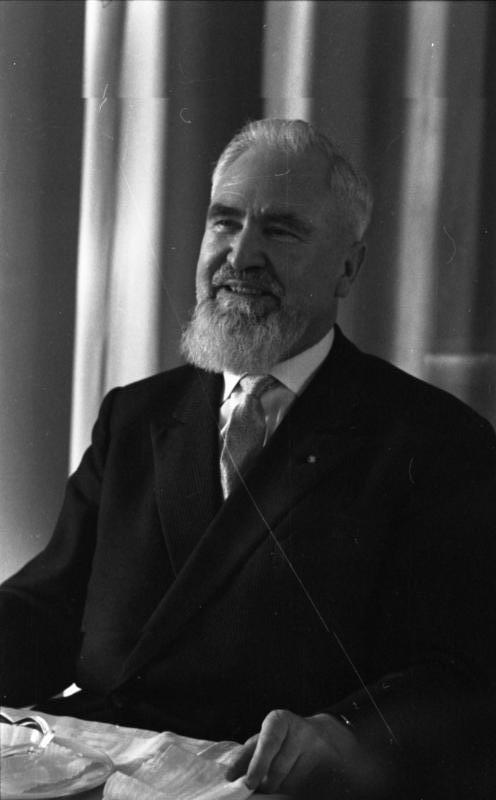

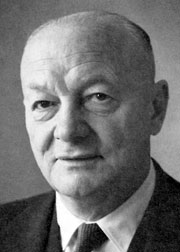

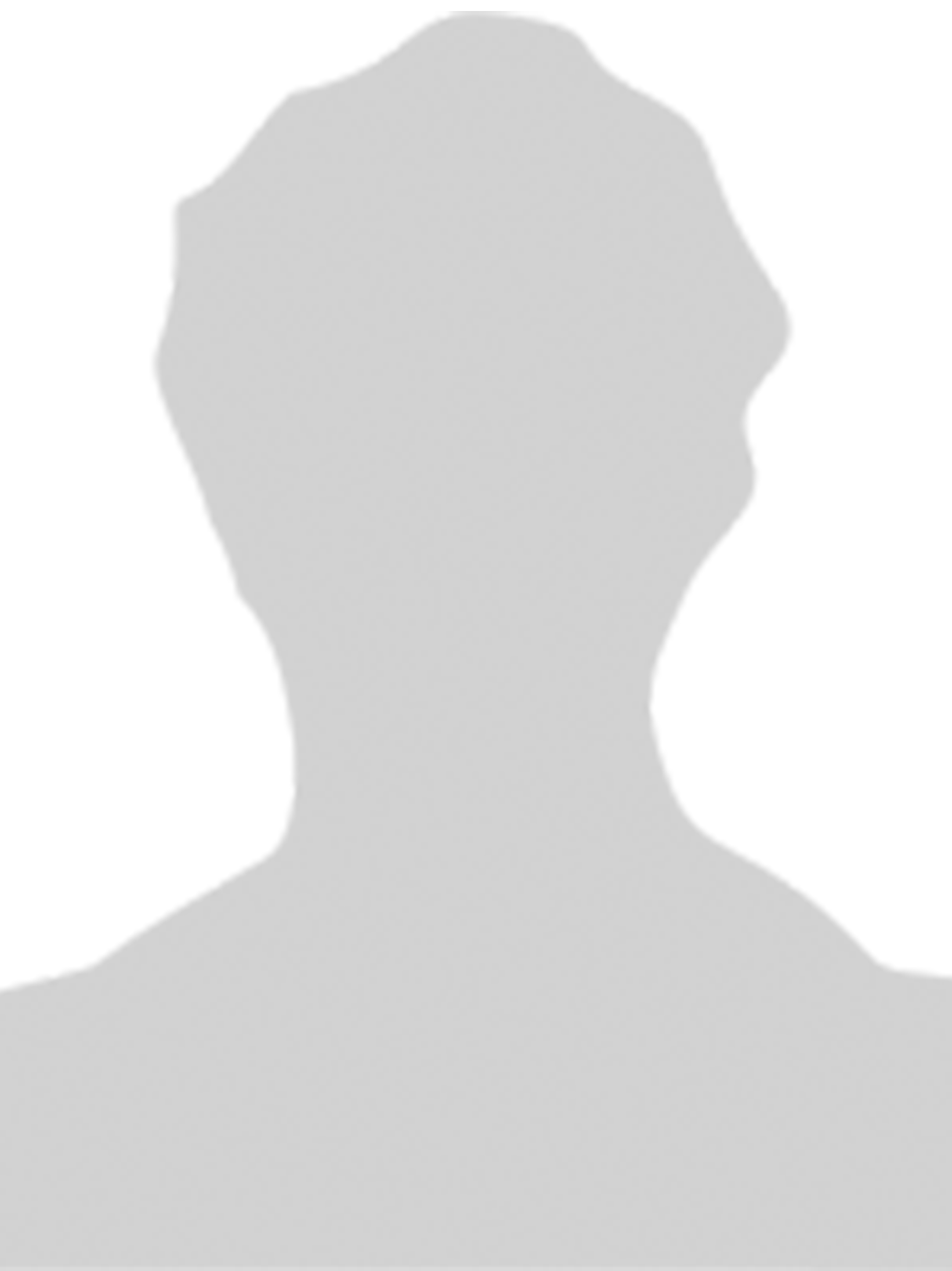

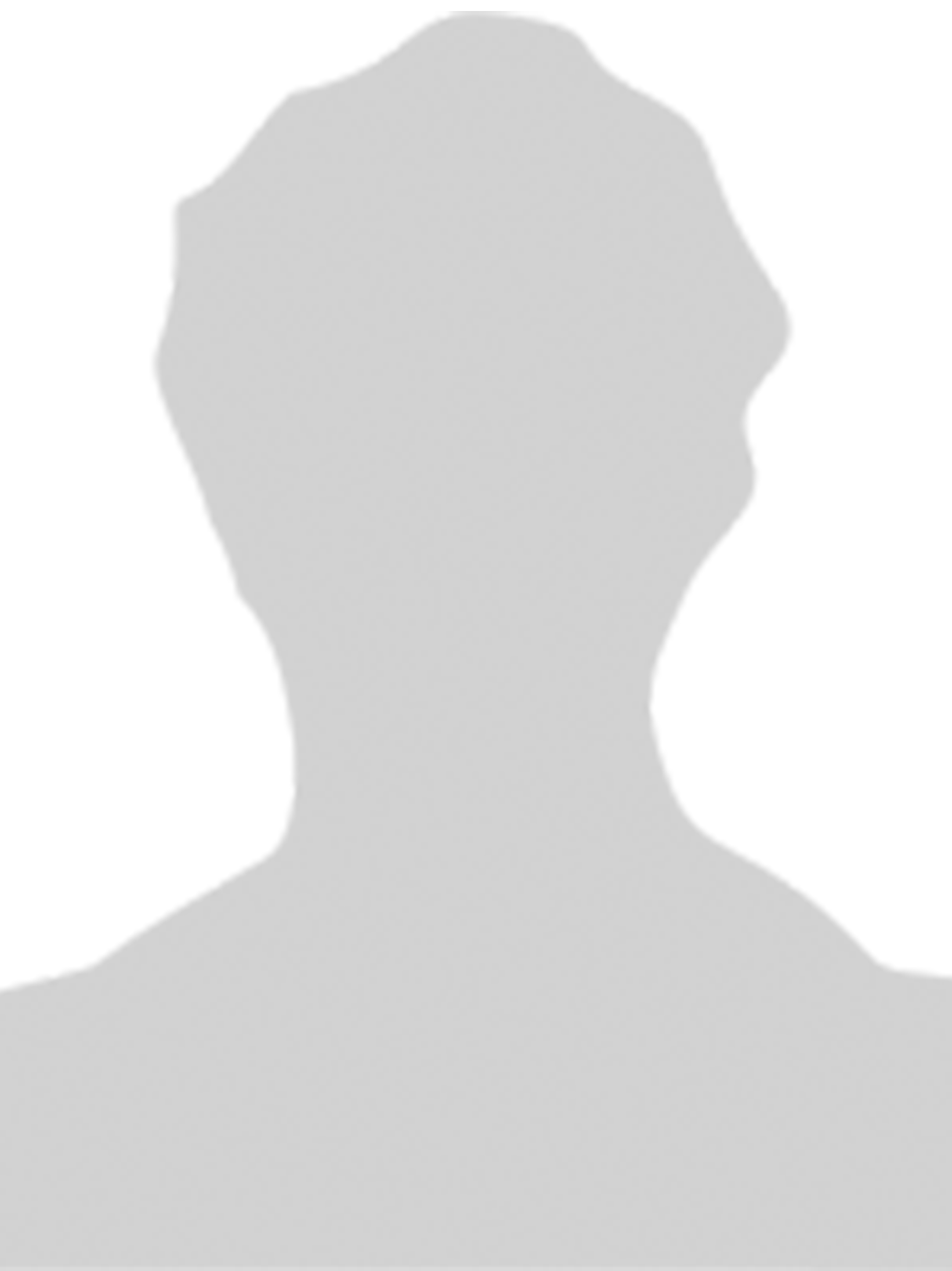

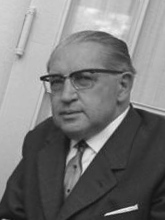
	First party	Second party	Third party
Leader	Alois Hundhammer	Jean Stock	Hermann Schirmer
Party	CSU	SPD	KPD
Seats won	109	51	9
Popular vote	1,587,595	786,045	145,749
Percentage	58.3%	28.8%	5.3%
	Fourth party	Fifth party
Leader	Alfred Loritz	Thomas Dehler
Party	WAV	FDP
Seats won	8	3
Popular vote	137,765	68,417
Percentage	5.1%	2.5%
Minister-President before election
Wilhelm Hoegner
SPD
Elected Minister-President
Wilhelm Hoegner
SPD

The June 1946 Bavarian state election was held on 30 June 1946 to elect the members of the Bavarian Constituent Assembly. It was the first election held in Bavaria since 1932. The constituent assembly was tasked with drafting and passing a new constitution for the Bavarian state. After the passage of the constitution, the Constituent Assembly was dissolved and new elections called for December.

== Background ==
Bavaria was completely occupied by American troops at the end of April 1945. General George S. Patton appointed Christian democrat Fritz Schäffer as interim Minister-President on 28 May 1945, before being dismissed by General Dwight D. Eisenhower on 28 September 1945 due to Schäffer's past anti-Semitic positions, and hiring of ex-Nazis within his administration.

The Ministry was then handed over to social democrat Wilhelm Hoegner, who oversaw the creation of a new Bavarian constitution in the spring and summer of 1946. To aid him, the Advisory State Committee was formed, with its members being appointed by the political parties or the state. The body was eventually dissolved, with direct elections being called for a Constituent State Assembly to oversee the passage of the Constitution. Thus, the first democratic elections were held in Bavaria since 1932.

== Election result ==
Summary of the election results for the Landtag of Bavaria
Party	Votes	%	Seats	Seats %
Christian Social Union (CSU)	1,587,595	58.3	109	60.6
Social Democratic Party (SPD)	786,045	28.8	51	28.3
Communist Party (KPD)	145,749	5.3	9	5
Economic Reconstruction Union (WAV)	137,765	5.1	8	4.4
Free Democratic Party (FDP)	68,417	2.5	3	1.7
Total	3,048,337	100.0	180	
Voter turnout		72.1		

Popular Vote
CSU	58.3%
SPD	28.8%
KPD	5.3%
WUV	5.1%
FDP	2.5%

Landtag seats
CSU	60.6%
SPD	28.3%
KPD	5%
WUV	4.4%
FDP	1.7%
