= Otto Ernst Remer =

German Wehrmacht Army officer and Neo-Nazi Leader (1912–1997)

Generalmajor Otto Ernst Remer
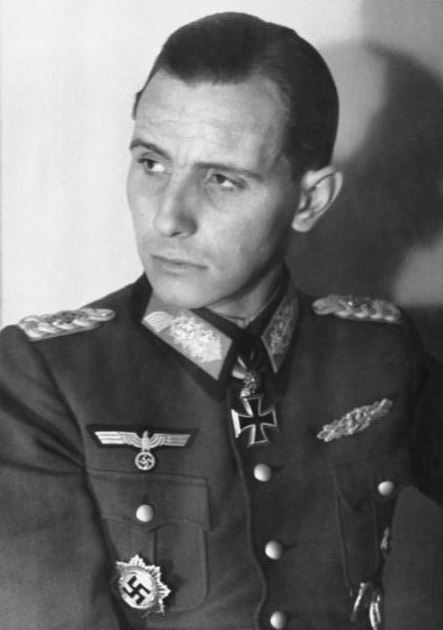
- Remer in 1945
- Born: 18 August 1912; Neubrandenburg, German Empire
- Died: 4 October 1997 (aged 85); Marbella, Spain
- Known for: Foiling 20 July plot Founding Socialist Reich Party; Holocaust denial
- Status: Deceased
- Conviction: Incitement of racial hatred
- Penalty: 22 months imprisonment
- Military career
- Allegiance: Nazi Germany
- Branch: German Army
- Service years: 1933-1945
- Rank: Generalmajor
- Commands: Führer Begleit Brigade; Infantry Regiment Großdeutschland
- Conflicts: World War II: Invasion of Poland; Balkans campaign; Eastern Front; Third Battle of Kharkov; 20 July plot; Western Front; Battle of the Bulge (POW)
- Awards: Knight's Cross of the Iron Cross with Oak Leaves

Generalmajor Otto Ernst Remer (18 August 1912 – 4 October 1997) was a German Army officer who served during World War II and played a major role in stopping the 20 July plot in 1944 against Adolf Hitler. He was a captain and a major (1943–1944), and finally a Oberst (colonel) and a Generalmajor (major general) in 1945. In his later years, he became a politician and far-right activist. He co-founded the Socialist Reich Party in West Germany in the 1950s and is considered an influential figure in postwar neo-fascist politics in Germany.

== Early life ==
Otto Ernst Remer was born in Neubrandenburg, Mecklenburg-Strelitz, in the German Empire on 18 August 1912. He attended a military academy and was commissioned as an officer in the German Army 1932 at the age of 20, a few months before Adolf Hitler rose to power in Germany, initiating a series of laws in the Weimar Republic which made him the sole leader in the country.

== Military career ==
Remer began his career in April 1933 as an ensign in the 4th Prussian Infantry Regiment. Remer took part in the Invasion of Poland in 1939 (upon which he was awarded the rank of Oberleutnant or Lieutenant), the Balkans Campaign, and Operation Barbarossa. In April 1942, he was posted to Infantry Regiment Großdeutschland.

In February 1943, he commanded an infantry battalion (with the rank of Army Hauptmann/Captain or Army Major) in the Großdeutschland Division (GD) after the regiment was reformed into a division. His troops covered the withdrawal of a Waffen-SS tank corps during the Third Battle of Kharkov. He was awarded the Knight's Cross for his service as battalion commander and, in November 1943, he was awarded the Oak leaves to the Knight's Cross, which was presented personally by Adolf Hitler.

=== 20 July Plot ===
In March 1944, Remer was appointed as the commanding officer of Wachbataillon Großdeutschland. On 20 July 1944 Wehrmacht officers staged a coup d'etat and attempted to assassinate Adolf Hitler by means of a bomb-attack at the "Wolf's Lair" in East Prussia. Remer, who was in Berlin at the time, first heard news of it from members of the Nazi Party, and waited for official word of Hitler's fate.

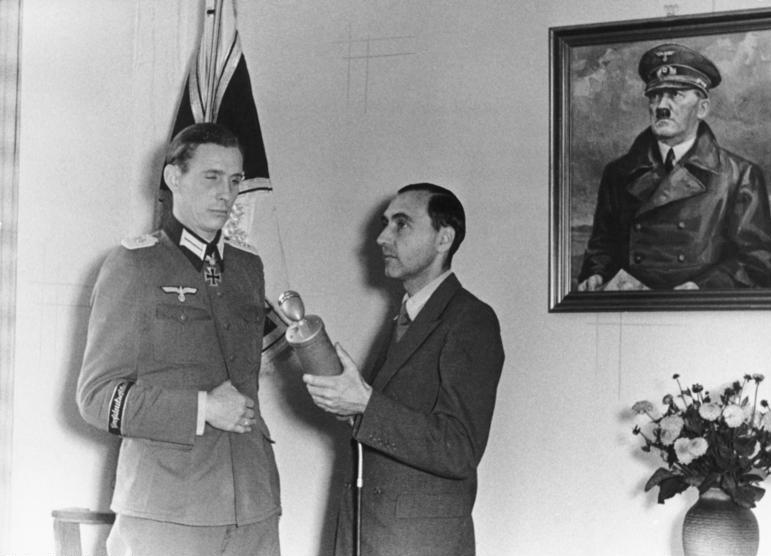
Remer gives an interview to the Reich Broadcasting Corporation in the aftermath of the 20 July Plot.

On the evening of 20 July 1944, Oberst Claus Graf von Stauffenberg, the officer who had carried out the attack upon Hitler, arrived back in Berlin, and, believing that he had succeeded in killing him, issued orders to Remer to arrest several senior Nazi Government officials, claiming that they were part of a coup. Upon being ordered by General Paul von Hase to arrest Minister of Propaganda Joseph Goebbels, Remer went to Goebbels' office to do so. However, on arrival, Remer was met by Goebbels' protestations that Hitler was still alive and had issued counter-orders to those Remer was enforcing. When Remer asked for proof, Goebbels picked up the phone and asked to be put through to Hitler at the "Wolf's Lair", then handed him the telephone receiver, upon which Remer heard Hitler's voice, ordering him to crush the plot in Berlin with the troops under his command. Remer with this realised that he had been taking orders from the mutineers and returning with his troops to the Berlin Military Headquarters, Bendlerblock, he arrested the plotters, including Stauffenberg.

Generaloberst Friedrich Fromm had the plotters immediately summarily executed by firing squad, despite Remer's protestations that he had been told to keep the plotters alive if possible pending further orders from Hitler, who was returning to Berlin (General Fromm himself would subsequently be executed by firing squad). That same night, Remer was promoted two ranks to Oberst (Colonel), then to Generalmajor in early 1945.

For the rest of the war, Generalmajor Remer commanded the Führerbegleitbrigade (FBB), a field unit formed from a Grossdeutschland cadre, in East Prussia, and during the Ardennes Offensive. He was captured by the United States Army towards the end of the war and remained a prisoner of war until 1947.

== Postwar life ==
=== Political activities ===
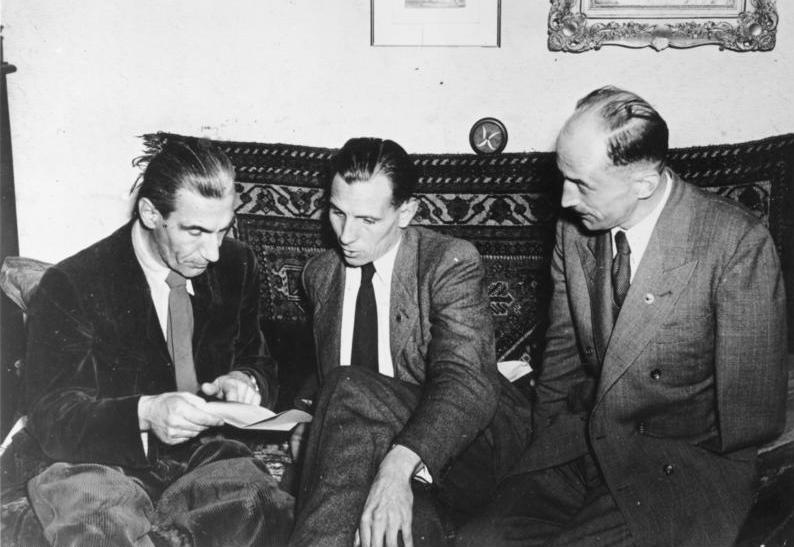
Former Generalmajor Remer (centre) with Socialist Reich Party leaders, August 1952

After his release from allied captivity, he became involved in West German post-war politics. He set up a political organisation, the Socialist Reich Party, in 1950, which was promptly banned in 1952 for making inflammatory political statements, but not before it had gathered 360,000 supporters in Lower Saxony and Schleswig-Holstein, and won 16 seats in the state parliament. The Socialist Reich Party also won eight seats in the Parliament of the Free Hanseatic City of Bremen. The party had received some financing from the Soviet Union, and worked with the Communist Party of Germany, whose aim was the destabilisation of the West German state. Among the campaigning themes of the Socialist Reich Party was that the Holocaust had been an allied propaganda invention (it accused the United States of building fake gas chambers and producing bogus newsreel footage about concentration camps), that the politics of the newly-formed West German state which had been created by the Allied powers were merely a front for American domination, and that West Germany's purported status as a puppet of the United States should be opposed.

=== Exile ===
With the party banned, Remer faced criminal charges from the West German government for being actively engaged in an attempt to re-establish a neo-Nazi political movement. After an arrest warrant was issued against him on these charges, he went into hiding at a chalet belonging to Countess Faber-Castell, an early supporter of the Socialist Reich Party, before subsequently fleeing to Egypt. There, he served as an advisor to Gamal Abdel Nasser, and worked with other expatriate Germans assisting Arab states with the development of their armed forces. He was a frequent acquaintance of Johann von Leers. In 1956, Remer was reported to be in Damascus, engaging in the arms trade; the Algerian National Liberation Front was one of his customers.

"I know Mr. Arafat quite well, naturally," he asserted. "I saw him many times. He invited me to eat at his headquarters. I knew all his people. They wanted many things from us." For Remer, anyone who was an enemy of Israel was his friend, particularly when a profit could be turned. He claimed to have brokered several business deals between West German companies and the PLO, but Remer denied that he also arranged arms shipments for the PLO. "I couldn't have done so," he maintained. "Arafat gets all he wants from Russia. A German arms dealer can't get into business there."

=== Criminal prosecution ===
He returned to West Germany in the 1980s, once more involving himself in politics with the setting up of an organization entitled the "German Freedom Movement" (G.F.M.), which advocated the reunification of East and West Germany and the removal of NATO military forces from West German soil. The G.F.M. was an umbrella organisation for multiple underground neo-Nazi splinter groups of varying descriptions, and Remer used it to influence a younger generation of post-war Germans.

From 1991 to 1994, Remer published a political newsletter entitled Remer-Depesche, conveying his political philosophy. Its content led to a court case where he was sentenced to 22 months' imprisonment in October 1992 for incitement of racial hatred by writing and publishing a series of articles stating that the Holocaust was a myth. (The political impact of the case upon the Government is discussed in Searle's Wehrmacht Generals.) Remer filed numerous appeals against his conviction, however his complaints of unfairness of trial and violations of freedom of speech were unanimously rejected, ultimately by the European Commission of Human Rights, to which he had taken his case. In February 1994, having exhausted all means of appeal in the newly united Federal German Republic, he fled to Spain to avoid the prison sentence. From there he supported the activities internationally of people publicly questioning the historical veracity of the Holocaust, such as Fred Leuchter and Germar Rudolf. The High Court of Spain ruled against requests made by the German Government for his extradition back to Germany, stating that he had not committed any crimes under Spanish law.

=== Legacy and death ===
Helmut Friebe, a leader of the Alliance of German Soldiers and former Generalleutnant of the Wehrmacht, had the following to say about Remer: "No judgment will be made here as to whether his decision on 20 July was right or wrong. But the consequences of his decision were so terrible,... that we old soldiers had expected that a man to whom destiny gave such a burden to carry until the end of his life would recognize this, and would thereafter live quietly and in reclusion. We, his former comrades, lack any sympathy for the fact that Herr Remer fails to summon up this attitude of self-effacement".

Remer died in Marbella in southern Spain on 4 October 1997, at the age of 85 from natural causes. His ashes were buried in an undisclosed location in Germany.

== In popular culture ==
Major Remer was portrayed by German actor Thomas Kretschmann in the 2008 movie Valkyrie.

== Awards ==
- Iron Cross (1939) 2nd Class (20 May 1940) & 1st Class (12 June 1940)
- German Cross in Gold on 29 August 1942 as Hauptmann in IV./Infanterie-Regiment "Großdeutschland"
- Close Combat Clasp in Silver
- Wound Badge in Silver
- Knight's Cross of the Iron Cross with Oak Leaves
  - Knight's Cross on 18 May 1943 as Major and commander of I./Grenadier-Regiment "Großdeutschland"
  - 325th Oak Leaves on 12 November 1943 as Major and commander of the I.(gepanzert)/Grenadier-Regiment (motorized) "Großdeutschland"
