= Alfred Loritz =

German lawyer and politician

Alfred Loritz (born 24 April 1902 in Munich – died 14 April 1979 in Vienna) was a German lawyer and politician who briefly rose to prominence in the immediate aftermath of the Second World War.

== Early life ==
Loritz was admitted to the bar in Munich in 1929.

Loritz joined the German Economic Party, and became chair of the party's affiliate in Munich in 1931. However, he was expelled from the party in 1932.

The Catholic Loritz was a right-wing opponent of the Nazi regime. In early 1939, he made contact with a group of Bavarian monarchists in an ultimately-abortive attempt to foment discontent. He claimed to have organized a failed plot on 8 November 1939 to kill Adolf Hitler with a bomb in the Bürgerbräukeller. Loritz spent most of the war in exile in Switzerland.

== Political career ==
The American occupation zone authorities gave Loritz permission to form a political party, the Economic Reconstruction Party (WAV), in December 1945. Loritz gained a reputation as a demagogic speaker. A believer in a strong federal Germany, Loritz's fiery rhetoric attracted attention both in Germany itself and from the occupiers, with some even suggesting that he might prove to be "a new Hitler". However, although he belonged to the political right, Loritz's populism lacked a strong ideological basis, and he appealed mainly to internal refugees who saw him as a strong voice for their defence.

WAV directly appealed to Germans expelled from eastern Europe that were ignored by the other parties. WAV placed third in the Bavarian Landtag elections of 1946. Loritz joined the state cabinet as the Minister for Political Liberation, which was in charge of denazification, in 1947, but was dismissed six months later due to poor administrative work; his successor found over 1,600 unopened letters.

Loritz was arrested for black market activities and perjury after being dismissed from his ministry, but was able to transfer from a jail to a hospital after claiming to be sick. He escaped from the hospital and avoided arrest for thirteen months. He was given 90 days in prison for his escape, but was not convicted on the black market and perjury charges. His parliamentary immunity was lifted by the state landtag so that prison guards could sue him for insulting them, but Loritz avoided the lawsuit by being elected to the Bundestag.

WAV and Neuburgerbund, a refugee organization, formed an alliance for the 1949 election and won 12 seats. However, it largely disintegrated as an organisation and saw its vote collapse in the state elections of 1950 and the municipal elections of 1952, when its vote share had fallen to 0.3%. In the Bundestag, the party quickly fell apart, with four deputies breaking away in October 1950 to link up with the Centre Party. That was followed by six more in December 1951 leaving WAV to join the German Party, along with a seventh, who joined the Deutsche Rechtspartei. Loritz became an independent and, although a handful of far-right independents linked up with him in 1953, his influence had largely gone. He was not a candidate in the 1953 election.

== Disappearance and death ==
Loritz attempted to revive his political career in Bremen and formed the German Reconstruction Party in 1955. However, he was accused for forging signatures for his party. He was put on trial for five months in 1959 at a cost of 150,000 marks and over 200 witnesses were called. He was found guilty and sentenced to 3 1/2 years in prison.

Loritz fled to Austria and appealed his conviction. The Federal Court of Justice annulled his trial, but Loritz refused to return for a new trial unless he was given safe passage by Bavaria and Bremen. This condition was refused so he remained in Austria. He was arrested in Salzburg on 25 December 1961, while trying to board a train to Switzerland. West Germany attempted to extradite him from Austria, but Austria refused stating that the charges against Loritz were political. He remained in Austria and died in a Vienna hospital in 1979.

== Works cited ==
- Long, Wellington (1968). The New Nazis of Germany. Chilton Company.
