= Economic Reconstruction Union =

Former German political party

Economic Reconstruction Union Wirtschaftliche Aufbau-Vereinigung
- Leader: Alfred Loritz
- Founded: 1945
- Dissolved: c. 1955
- Preceded by: Economic Party (unofficial)
- Ideology: Right-wing populism Federalism
- Political position: Right-wing to far-right

The Economic Reconstruction Union (German: Wirtschaftliche Aufbau-Vereinigung or WAV) was a German political party that was active immediately in Allied-occupied Germany after the Second World War. Although usually translated into English as the Economic Reconstruction Union it is also sometimes known as the Union for Economic Reconstruction, the Economic Reconstruction Association, or the Economic Reconstruction Party.

== Formation ==
The WAV, which existed only in Bavaria, was established in 1945 by the Munich lawyer Alfred Loritz. It was officially licensed as a political party by the US military government on 8 December 1945. The party's programme was populist and was in some ways simply a support for its demagogic leader as it had a very limited policy base beyond support for federalism. Due to its anti-liberal stance the group has been characterised as radical right wing populist party by Betz and Immerfall. Like the later All-German Bloc/League of Expellees and Deprived of Rights the WAV's main support base was amongst internal expellees and it had little support amongst native Bavarians. It also sought to reach out to demobilised soldiers and small-time former Nazi Party officials with only perfunctory connections to ideological Nazism who saw themselves as the victims of denazification plans.

== Into the Bundestag ==
The party secured representation in the Landtag of Bavaria in 1946. However the WAV went into decline as its lack of coherent policy and disaffection with Loritz's heavy-handed style of leadership led to around half of the party's local branches having been disbanded by 1948. In the 1948 local elections the demoralised party gained only 1.7% of the vote. Nevertheless, the party contested the Bavarian seats in the 1949 West German federal election and captured 14.4% of the vote to win twelve seats. As a part of an agreement Loritz signed with the Passau-based refugee organisation the New Citizens Alliance half of the party's candidates were refugees and as a result they gained widespread support in those constituencies with the highest number of refugees. This group, led by the radical nationalist Gunther Goetzendorff, had been barred by the American authorities from participating in the 1949 election and so worked with the WAV for convenience. The combined group, under the WAV banner, was a "radical nationalist party".

== Decline ==
The 1949 election represented the high-water mark of the WAV, which went into steep decline thereafter. Their vote collapsed in the 1950 election to the Landtag of Bavaria, with the 2.8% vote share obtained falling some distance short of the 5% required to enter the Assembly. By that October the party within the Bundestag began to disintegrate when four of its members left to form a new group for refugees associated with the Centre Party. In December 1951 a further group of six deputies left to join the German Party and when another joined the Deutsche Reichspartei soon afterwards it left Loritz as the WAV's sole deputy. Worse was to come, as in 1952 when the party contested the municipal elections it captured only 0.3% of the vote.

No WAV candidates were put forward for the 1953 federal election and the party itself effectively disappeared soon after.
