= 1949 West German federal election =

- 14 August 1949

All 402 seats in the Bundestag (Note: As well as the 22 non-voting delegates for West Berlin, elected by the West Berlin Legislature.) 202 seats needed for a majority
- Registered: 31,207,620
- Turnout: 78.5%

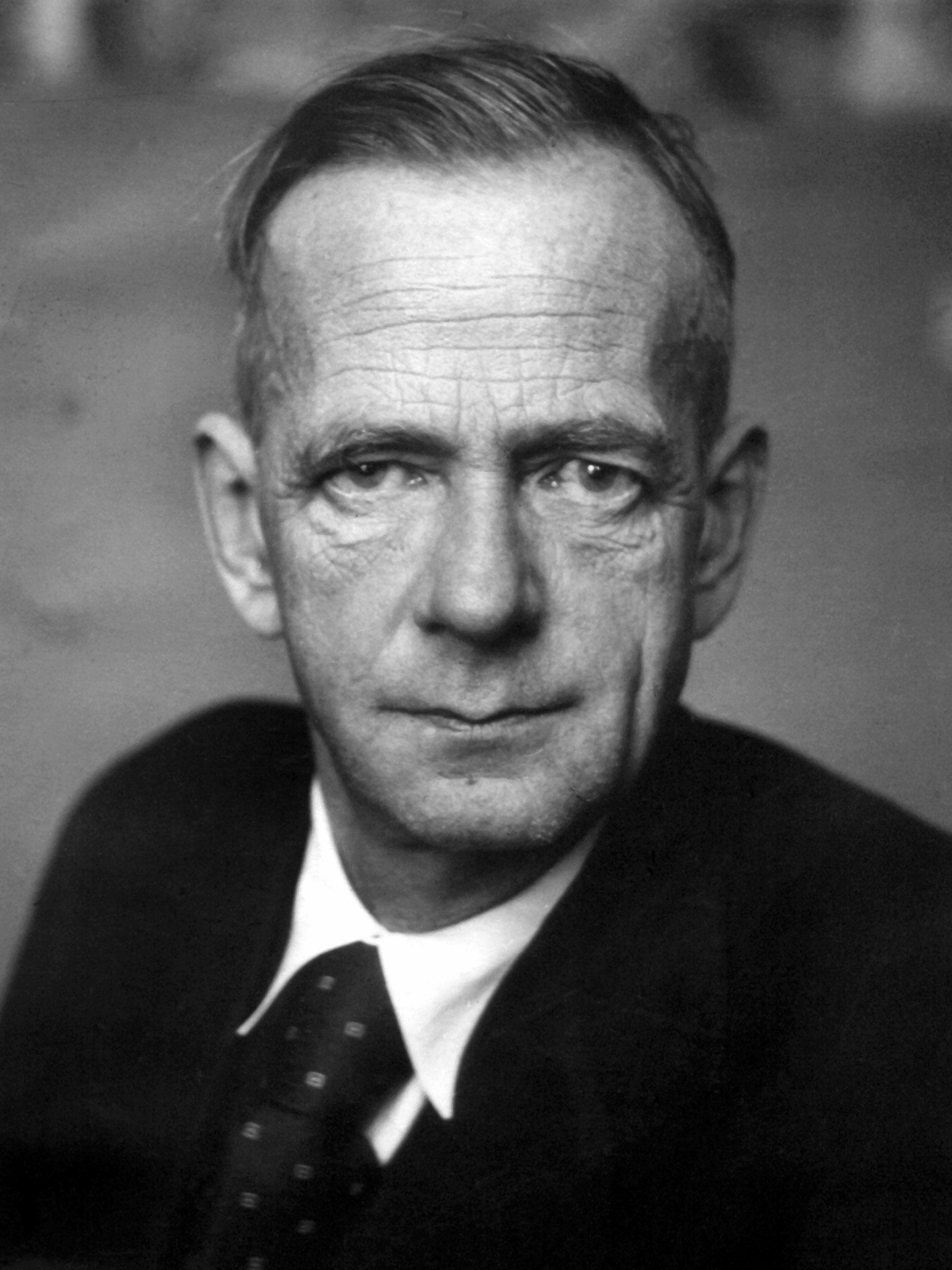

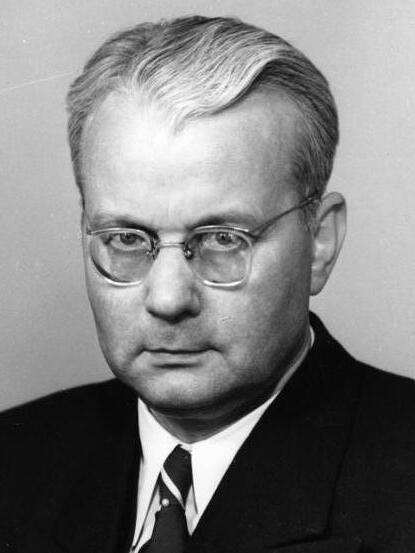

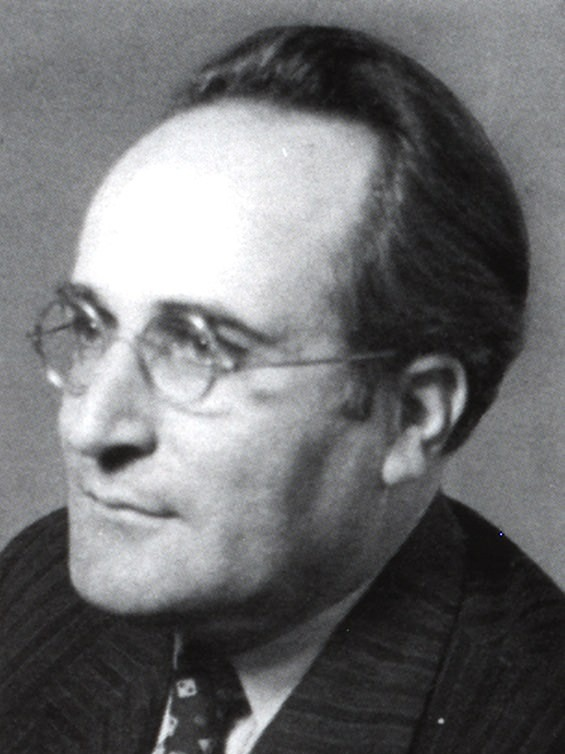

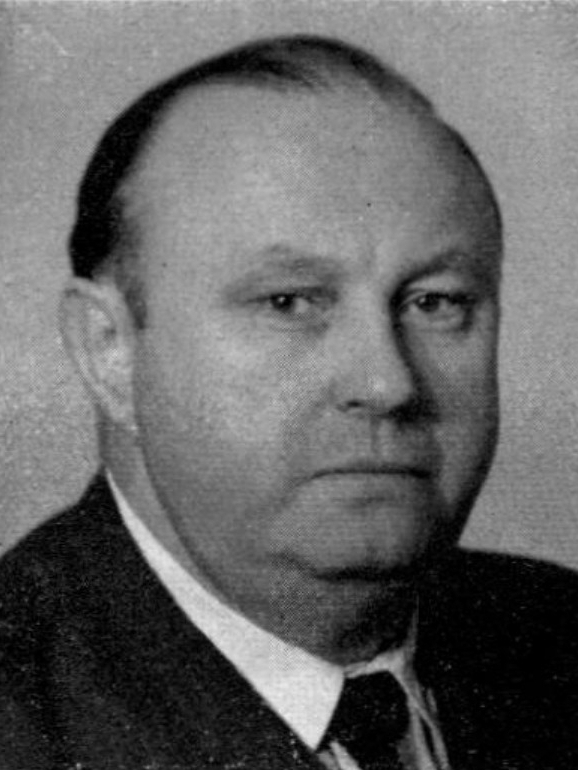

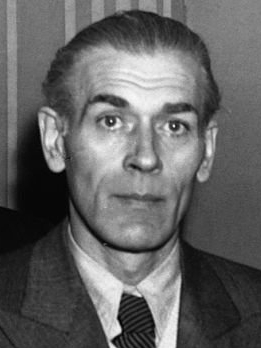
	First party	Second party	Third party
Candidate	Konrad Adenauer	Kurt Schumacher	Franz Blücher
Party	CDU/CSU	SPD	FDP
Seats won	139 (Note: Plus two non-voting delegates for West Berlin.)	131 (Note: Plus five non-voting delegates for West Berlin.)	52 (Note: Plus one non-voting delegate for West Berlin.)
Popular vote	7,359,084	6,934,975	2,829,920
Percentage	31.0%	29.2%	11.9%
	Fourth party	Fifth party	Sixth party
Candidate	Joseph Baumgartner	Heinrich Hellwege	Max Reimann
Party	BP	DP	KPD
Seats won	17	17	15
Popular vote	986,478	939,934	1,361,706
Percentage	4.2%	4.0%	5.7%
- The left side shows constituency winners of the election by their party colours. The right side shows party list winners of the election for the additional members by their party colours.
Government after election
First Adenauer cabinet
CDU/CSU–FDP–DP

A federal election was held in West Germany on 14 August 1949 to elect the members of the first Bundestag, with a further eight seats elected in West Berlin between 1949 and January 1952 and another eleven between February 1952 and 1953. They were the first contested federal elections in West Germany since 1933, the first free ones since 1932, and the first after the division of the country.

The CDU/CSU formed a centre-right coalition government with the FDP and the DP.

== Campaign ==
After World War II, the German Instrument of Surrender and the country's division into four Allied occupation zones, the elections were held in the Federal Republic of Germany, established under occupation statute in the three Western zones with the proclamation of its Basic Law by the Parlamentarischer Rat assembly of the West German states on 23 May 1949. Most West German parties at the time of the 1949 Bundestag election were committed to democracy, but they disagreed on what kind of democracy West Germany should become.

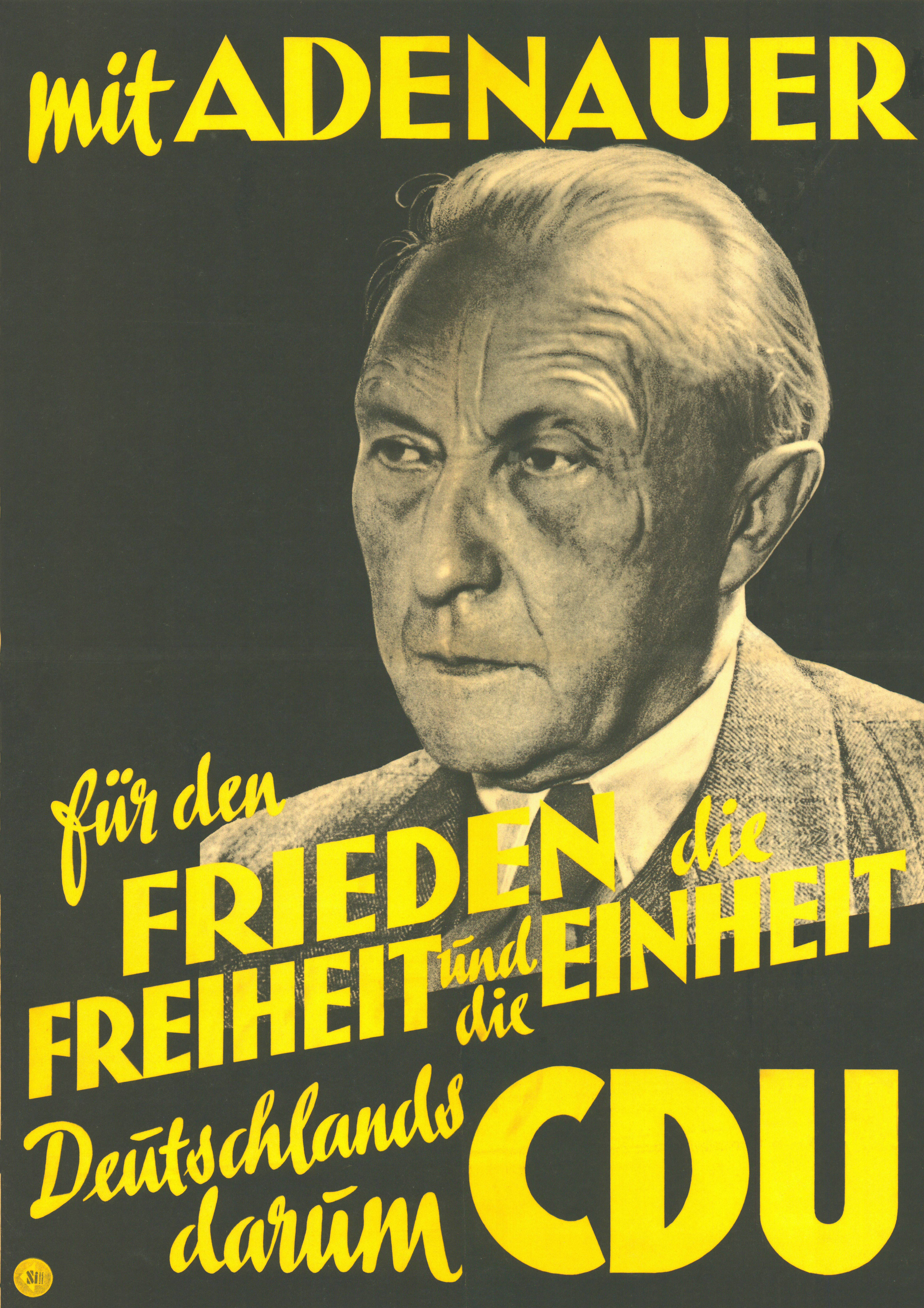
CDU election poster: With Adenauer for peace, freedom and unity in Germany.

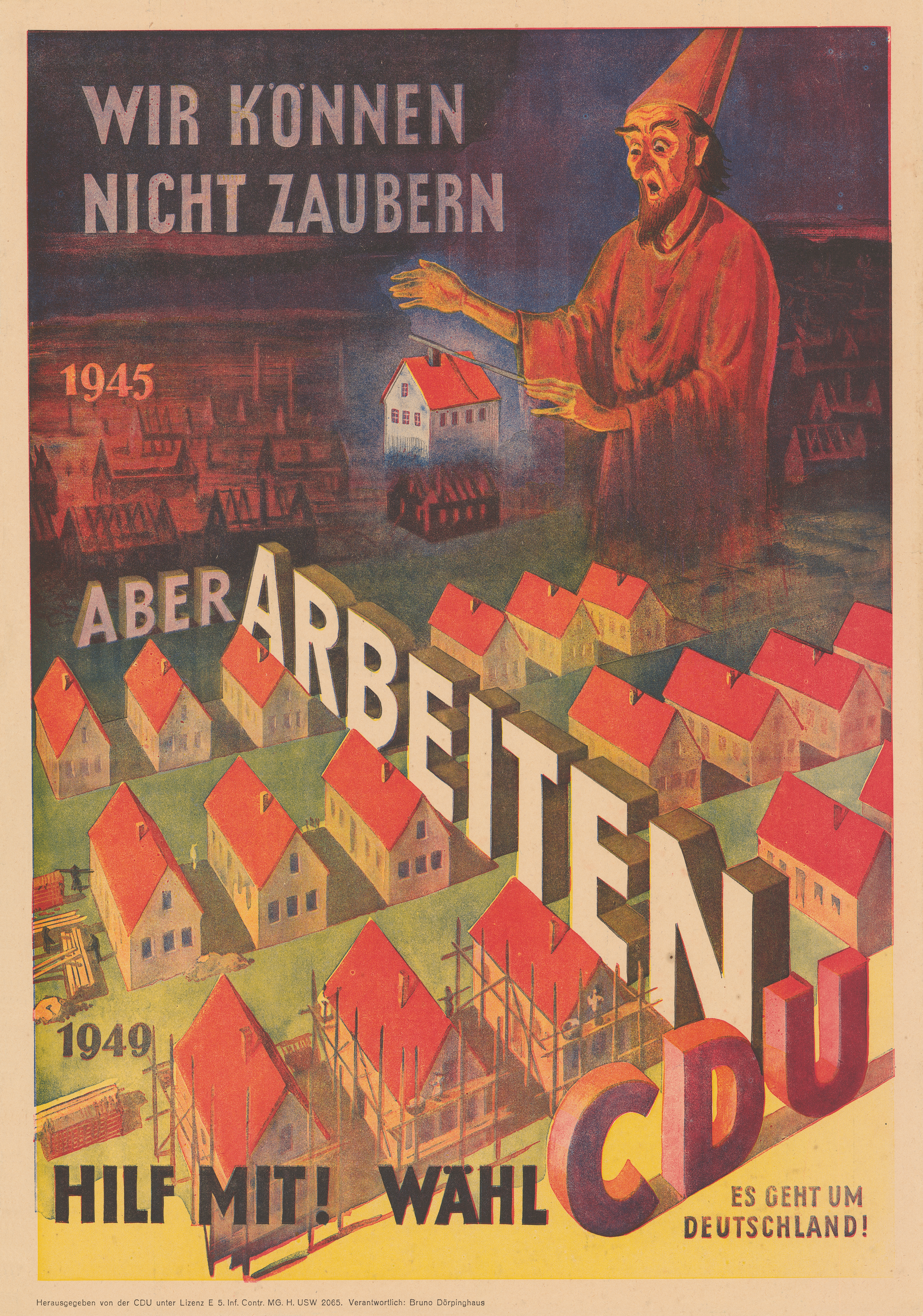
1949 election poster of the CDU reading "We cannot do magic – but we can work/do our job. Help us. Vote for CDU. It's about Germany!"

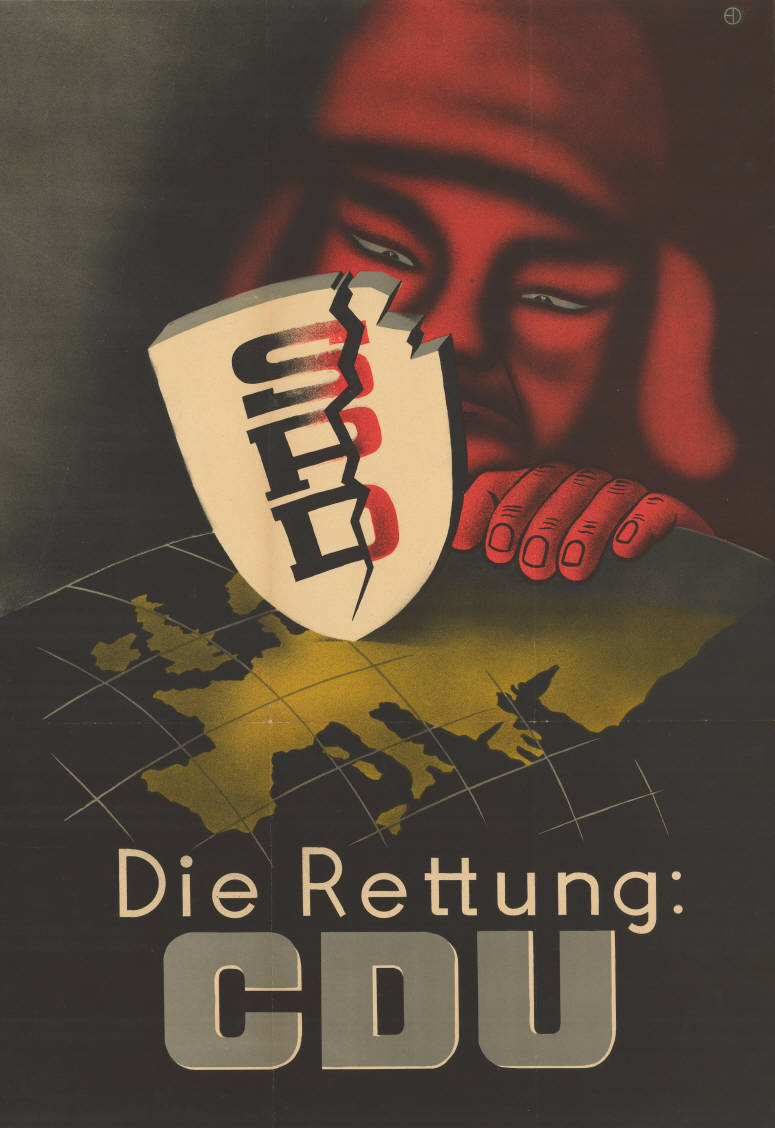
1949 election poster of the CDU reading "The Rescue: CDU"

The Christian Democratic (CDU) leader, 73-year-old Konrad Adenauer, former mayor of Cologne and party chairman in the British Zone since March 1946, believed in moderate, non-denominational and Christian democracy, social market economy and integration with the West. In 1948 he had become president of the Parlamentarischer Rat, an office that added to his popularity as protagonist of a "state-to-be". He attacked social democracy and the British, especially, dismantling of industry.

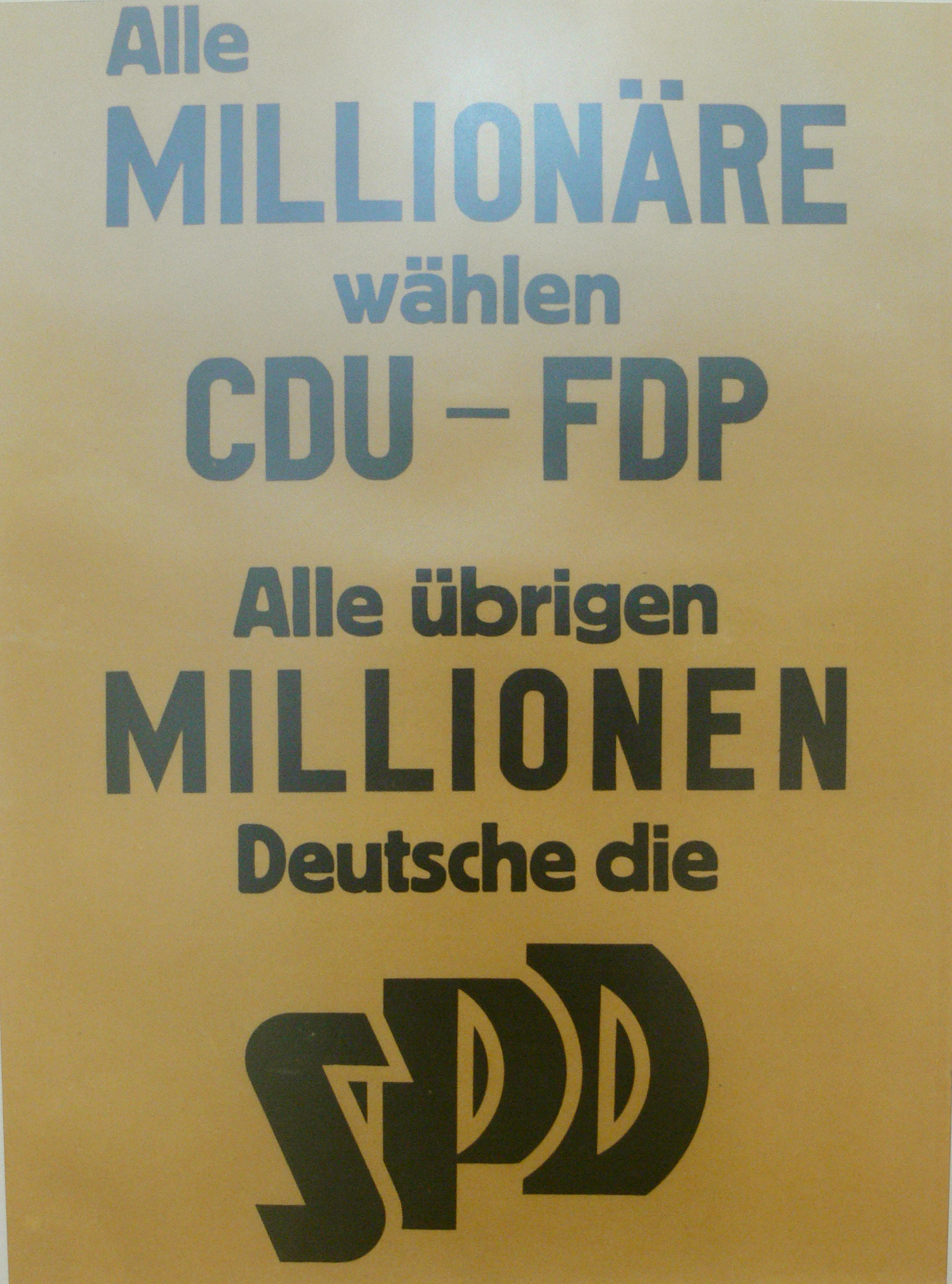
SPD election poster: All millionaires vote for CDU-FDP. All other millions of Germans for the SPD

The Social Democratic (SPD) leader, Kurt Schumacher, wanted a united, democratic and socialist Germany. Schumacher had heavily agitated against the forced merger of the Communist Party (KPD) and SPD (both in the Soviet occupation zone) into the Socialist Unity Party of Germany and he had also turned the party's course away from the working class advocacy group of the Weimar Republic towards a left-wing big tent party with distinct patriotic features. He constantly accused Adenauer of betraying national interests, culminating in his heckling at the Bundestag session of 25 September 1949: "The Chancellor of the Allies!". Schumacher criticized the Catholic Church, calling it the fifth occupying power and criticized denominational education.

== Results ==
In the end and to the great disappointment of the Social Democrats, the CDU/CSU outnumbered them by 31.0% to 29.2% of the votes cast. Enough participating West Germans favoured Adenauer's and his coalition partners' – the liberal Free Democrats' (FDP) and the conservative German Party's (DP) – policies and promises over Schumacher's and the other left-wingers' policies to give the centre-right parties a slight majority of deputies.

To enter the Bundestag, a party had to surmount a threshold of 5% at least in one of the states or to win at least one electoral district; ten parties succeeded. A number of non-voting members (elected in 1949:2 CDU, 5 SPD, 1 FDP; joined in February 1952 by: 3 CDU, 4 SPD, 4 FDP) indirectly elected by the West Berlin legislature (Stadtverordnetenversammlung) are included below in parentheses. The French Saar Protectorate did not participate in this election.

41 of the members elected to the Bundestag were refugees.

Party	Votes	%	Seats		
Party	Votes	%	FPTP	PR	Total (Note: Excludes the non-voting delegates for West Berlin (5 SPD, 2 CDU, 1 FDP))
Social Democratic Party	6,934,975	29.22	96	35	131
Christian Democratic Union	5,978,636	25.19	91	24	115
Free Democratic Party	2,829,920	11.92	12	40	52
Christian Social Union	1,380,448	5.82	24	0	24
Communist Party of Germany	1,361,706	5.74	0	15	15
Bavaria Party	986,478	4.16	11	6	17
German Party	939,934	3.96	5	12	17
Centre Party	727,505	3.07	0	10	10
Economic Reconstruction Union	681,888	2.87	0	12	12
Deutsche Rechtspartei	429,031	1.81	0	5	5
Radical Social Freedom Party	216,749	0.91	0	0	0
South Schleswig Voters' Association	75,388	0.32	0	1	1
European People's Movement of Germany	26,162	0.11	0	0	0
Rheinish-Westfalian People's Party	21,931	0.09	0	0	0
Independents	1,141,647	4.81	3	0	3
Total	23,732,398	100.00	242	160	402
Valid votes	23,732,398	96.88			
Invalid/blank votes	763,216	3.12			
Total votes	24,495,614	100.00			
Registered voters/turnout	31,207,620	78.49			
Source: Bundeswahlleiter

=== Results by state ===
==== Constituency seats ====
State	Total seats	Seats won						
State	Total seats	SPD	CDU	CSU	FDP	BP	DP	Ind.
Baden	7		7					
Bavaria	47	12		24		11		
Bremen	3	3						
Hamburg	8	4	3		1			
Hesse	22	12	3		7			
Lower Saxony	34	24	4		1		5	
North Rhine-Westphalia	66	25	40		1			
Rhineland-Palatinate	15	4	11					
Schleswig-Holstein	14	6	7					1
Württemberg-Baden	20	5	11		2			2
Württemberg-Hohenzollern	6	1	5					
Total	242	96	91	24	12	11	5	3

==== List seats ====
State	Total seats	Seats won									
State	Total seats	FDP	SPD	CDU	KPD	DP	WAV	DZP	BP	DRP	SSW
Baden	5	2	3								
Bavaria	31	7	6				12		6		
Bremen	2			1		1					
Hamburg	5	1	2		1	1					
Hesse	14	5	1	6	2						
Lower Saxony	24	4		8		7				5	
North Rhine-Westphalia	43	9	12	3	9			10			
Rhineland-Palatinate	10	4	3	2	1						
Schleswig-Holstein	9	2	2	1		3					1
Württemberg-Baden	13	5	5	1	2						
Württemberg-Hohenzollern	4	1	1	2							
Total	160	40	35	24	15	12	12	10	6	5	1

== Aftermath ==
Schumacher had explicitly refused a grand coalition and led his party into opposition, where it would remain until December 1966, assuming the chair of the SPD parliamentary group as minority leader. On 12 September 1949, he lost the indirect German presidential election, defeated by FDP chairman Theodor Heuss in the second ballot. Schumacher died on 20 August 1952 of the long-term consequences of his concentration camp imprisonment during the Nazi years.

Adenauer had favoured the formation of a smaller centre-right coalition from the beginning. Nominated by the CDU/CSU faction, he was elected the first Chancellor of the Federal Republic of Germany on 15 September 1949 by an absolute majority of 202 of 402 votes. Adenauer had ensured that the votes of the predominantly Social Democrat West Berlin deputies did not count and later stated that he "naturally" had voted for himself. On 20 September, he formed the Cabinet Adenauer I of CDU/CSU, FDP, and DP ministers. Chosen as an interim Chancellor, he held the office until 1963, being re-elected three times (in 1953, in 1957 and in 1961).

== Works cited ==
- Long, Wellington (1968). The New Nazis of Germany. Chilton Company.
