= Osterholz – Verden =

Federal electoral district of Germany

34 Osterholz – Verden
- Former electoral district for the Bundestag
- Osterholz – Verden in 2025
- State: Lower Saxony
- Population: 251,100 (2019)
- Electorate: 197,490 (2021)
- Major settlements: Achim; Osterholz-Scharmbeck; Verden an der Aller
- Area: 1,442.0 km^{2}

Former electoral district
- Created: 1949; 2009 (re-established)
- Abolished: 2002
- Party: CDU
- Member: Andreas Mattfeldt
- Elected: 2009, 2013, 2017, 2021, 2025

Osterholz – Verden is an electoral constituency (German: Wahlkreis) represented in the Bundestag. It elects one member via first-past-the-post voting. Under the current constituency numbering system, it is designated as constituency 34. It is located in northern Lower Saxony, comprising the districts of Osterholz and Verden.

Osterholz – Verden was created for the inaugural 1949 federal election. It was abolished in 2002 and re-established in the 2009 federal election. Since 2009, it has been represented by Andreas Mattfeldt of the Christian Democratic Union (CDU).

== Geography ==
Osterholz – Verden is located in northern Lower Saxony. As of the 2021 federal election, it comprises the entirety of the districts of Osterholz and Verden.

== History ==
Osterholz – Verden was created in 1949, then known as Verden – Rotenburg – Osterholz. In the 1965 through 1983 elections, it was named Verden. From 1987 until its abolition, it was named Verden – Osterholz. In the inaugural Bundestag election, it was Lower Saxony constituency 12 in the numbering system. From 1953 through 1961, it was number 34. From 1965 until its abolition, it was number 29. Originally, the constituency comprised the districts of Verden, Osterholz, and Rotenburg. In the 1980 election, the district of Rotenburg was transferred away. Verden – Osterholz was abolished in the 2002 election, and was divided between the new constituencies of Cuxhaven – Osterholz and Rotenburg – Verden.

The constituency was re-established in the 2009 election, acquiring the name Osterholz – Verden. It was constituency number 35, then number 34 since the 2013 election. Its borders have not changed since its re-establishment.

Election	No.	Name	Borders
1949	12	Verden – Rotenburg – Osterholz	Verden district; Osterholz district; Rotenburg district
1953	45	Verden – Rotenburg – Osterholz	Verden district; Osterholz district; Rotenburg district
1957	45	Verden – Rotenburg – Osterholz	Verden district; Osterholz district; Rotenburg district
1961	45	Verden – Rotenburg – Osterholz	Verden district; Osterholz district; Rotenburg district
1965	29	Verden	Verden district; Osterholz district; Rotenburg district
1969	29	Verden	Verden district; Osterholz district; Rotenburg district
1972	29	Verden	Verden district; Osterholz district; Rotenburg district
1976	29	Verden	Verden district; Osterholz district; Rotenburg district
1980	29	Verden	Verden district; Osterholz district
1983	29	Verden	Verden district; Osterholz district
1987	29	Verden – Osterholz	Verden district; Osterholz district
1990	29	Verden – Osterholz	Verden district; Osterholz district
1994	29	Verden – Osterholz	Verden district; Osterholz district
1998	29	Verden – Osterholz	Verden district; Osterholz district
2002	Abolished		
2005	Abolished		
2009	35	Osterholz – Verden	Osterholz district; Verden district
2013	34	Osterholz – Verden	Osterholz district; Verden district
2017	34	Osterholz – Verden	Osterholz district; Verden district
2021	34	Osterholz – Verden	Osterholz district; Verden district
2025	34	Osterholz – Verden	Osterholz district; Verden district

== Members ==
The constituency was first held by Hans-Joachim von Merkatz of the German Party (DP), who served from 1949 until 1961. In 1961, Karl Ravens of the Social Democratic Party (SPD) won the constituency. In the 1965 election, von Merkatz regained his seat, now as a candidate of the Christian Democratic Union (CDU). Ravens won the constituency again in 1969, and served until 1980. He was succeeded by fellow SPD member Arne Börnsen, who served a single term before Martin Oldenstädt of the CDU won the constituency in 1983. In the 1987 election, Börnsen returned as representative. He served until 1998, when he was succeeded by fellow SPD member Joachim Stünker, who served a single term before the constituency was abolished in 2002. Upon its re-establishment, it was won by the CDU's Andreas Mattfeldt. He was re-elected in 2013, 2017, and 2021.

Election	Member	Party	%
1949	Hans-Joachim von Merkatz	DP	32.7
1953	Hans-Joachim von Merkatz	DP	47.3
1957	Hans-Joachim von Merkatz	DP	47.8
1961	Karl Ravens	SPD	36.9
1965	Hans-Joachim von Merkatz	CDU	51.8
1969	Karl Ravens	SPD	46.8
1972	Karl Ravens	SPD	53.1
1976	Karl Ravens	SPD	48.5
1980	Arne Börnsen	SPD	50.6
1983	Martin Oldenstädt	CDU	46.6
1987	Arne Börnsen	SPD	46.4
1990	Arne Börnsen	SPD	44.6
1994	Arne Börnsen	SPD	47.6
1998	Joachim Stünker	SPD	53.4
Abolished (2002–2009)
2009	Andreas Mattfeldt	CDU	37.1
2013	Andreas Mattfeldt	CDU	44.0
2017	Andreas Mattfeldt	CDU	39.2
2021	Andreas Mattfeldt	CDU	33.7
2025	Andreas Mattfeldt	CDU	35.9

== Election results ==
=== 2025 election ===
Federal election (2025): Osterholz – Verden
Notes:	Blue background denotes the winner of the electorate vote. Pink background denotes a candidate elected from their party list. Yellow background denotes an electorate win by a list member, or other incumbent. A ✓ or ✗ denotes status of any incumbent, win or lose respectively.						
Party	Candidate	Votes	%	±%	Party votes	%	±%
CDU	✓ Andreas Mattfeldt	59,321	35.9	▲2.3	46,321	28.0	▲3.9
SPD	Özge Kadah	40,963	24.8	▼7.7	38,009	23.0	▼9.9
AfD	Susanne Rosilius	28,052	17.0		29,180	17.6	▲10.1
Greens	Lena Gumnior	18,449	11.2	▼3.5	20,450	12.4	▼3.7
Left	Herbert Behrens	11,071	6.7	▲2.4	12,060	7.3	▲3.8
FDP	Gero Hocker	4,952	3.0	▼6.2	6,942	4.2	▼6.2
BSW					6,531	3.9	
Tierschutzpartei					2,005	1.2	▼0.1
Volt	Hergen Ramme	2,255	1.4		1,176	0.7	▲0.5
FW					953	0.6	▼0.4
PARTEI					699	0.4	▼0.3
dieBasis					434	0.3	▼0.8
Pirates					248	0.1	▼0.1
BD					236	0.1	
Humanists					114	0.1	0.0
MLPD					37	0.0	0.0
Informal votes		1,094			762		
Total valid votes		165,063			165,395		
Turnout		166,157	84.7	▲8.1			
CDU hold	Majority	18,358	11.1	▲9.9			

=== 2021 election ===
Federal election (2021): Osterholz – Verden
Notes:	Blue background denotes the winner of the electorate vote. Pink background denotes a candidate elected from their party list. Yellow background denotes an electorate win by a list member, or other incumbent. A ✓ or ✗ denotes status of any incumbent, win or lose respectively.						
Party	Candidate	Votes	%	±%	Party votes	%	±%
CDU	✓ Andreas Mattfeldt	50,274	33.7	▼5.6	36,183	24.1	▼10.9
SPD	Michael Harjes	48,574	32.5	▲0.6	49,430	32.9	▲6.5
Greens	Lena Gumnior	21,933	14.7	▲8.0	24,183	16.1	▲6.8
FDP	Gero Hocker	13,764	9.2	▲3.8	15,653	10.4	▲1.6
AfD					11,329	7.5	▼2.1
Left	Mizgin Ciftci	6,375	4.3	▼2.8	5,253	3.5	▼3.8
Tierschutzpartei					1,986	1.3	▲0.4
FW	Dominique Paetz	4,578	3.1	▲2.4	1,494	1.0	▲0.6
dieBasis	Anton Körner	3,883	2.6		1,661	1.1	
PARTEI					1,134	0.8	▼0.1
Pirates					443	0.3	▼0.1
Team Todenhöfer					440	0.3	
Volt					343	0.2	
Humanists					131	0.1	
NPD					125	0.1	▼0.1
V-Partei3					112	0.1	▼0.1
ÖDP					105	0.1	0.0
du.					103	0.1	
LKR					50	0.0	
MLPD					34	0.0	0.0
DKP					27	0.0	0.0
Informal votes		1,927			1,089		
Total valid votes		149,381			150,219		
Turnout		151,308	76.6	▼1.4			
CDU hold	Majority	1,700	1.2	▼6.0			

=== 2017 election ===
Federal election (2017): Osterholz – Verden
Notes:	Blue background denotes the winner of the electorate vote. Pink background denotes a candidate elected from their party list. Yellow background denotes an electorate win by a list member, or other incumbent. A ✓ or ✗ denotes status of any incumbent, win or lose respectively.						
Party	Candidate	Votes	%	±%	Party votes	%	±%
CDU	✓ Andreas Mattfeldt	59,560	39.2	▼4.8	53,035	34.9	▼5.0
SPD	Christina Jantz-Herrmann	48,505	32.0	▼5.5	40,047	26.4	▼6.7
AfD	Jochen Rohrberg	12,995	8.6	▲5.4	14,675	9.7	▲5.8
Left	Herbert Behrens	10,714	7.1	▲2.0	11,055	7.3	▲1.7
Greens	Monika Geils	10,146	6.7	▼0.1	14,052	9.3	▼0.3
FDP	Gero Hocker	8,273	5.5	▲4.5	13,464	8.9	▲5.2
Tierschutzpartei					1,445	1.0	▲0.1
PARTEI					1,252	0.8	
FW	Ingo Lesch	1,072	0.7		631	0.4	▲0.1
Pirates					560	0.4	▼1.5
Independent	Susanne Hirsch-Sternberg	503	0.3				
NPD					354	0.2	▼0.7
BGE					343	0.2	
DM					284	0.2	
DiB					228	0.2	
V-Partei³					194	0.1	
ÖDP					125	0.1	
MLPD					35	0.0	0.0
DKP					19	0.0	
Informal votes		1,268			1,238		
Total valid votes		151,768			151,798		
Turnout		153,036	78.0	▲3.2			
CDU hold	Majority	11,055	7.2	▲0.6			

=== 2013 election ===
Federal election (2013): Osterholz – Verden
Notes:	Blue background denotes the winner of the electorate vote. Pink background denotes a candidate elected from their party list. Yellow background denotes an electorate win by a list member, or other incumbent. A ✓ or ✗ denotes status of any incumbent, win or lose respectively.						
Party	Candidate	Votes	%	±%	Party votes	%	±%
CDU	✓ Andreas Mattfeldt	63,174	44.0	▲7.0	57,243	40.0	▲8.0
SPD	Christina Jantz	53,660	37.4	▲0.8	47,413	33.1	▲3.9
Greens	Erich von Hofe	9,729	6.8	▼1.8	13,708	9.6	▼2.3
Left	Herbert Behrens	7,195	5.0	▼3.5	8,008	5.6	▼4.0
AfD	Thomas Hochrainer	4,499	3.1		5,487	3.8	
Pirates	Ole Schwettmann	2,516	1.8		2,655	1.9	▲0.2
FDP	Cédrik Kamlah	1,359	0.9	▼6.6	5,235	3.7	▼8.8
NPD	Claus Oeltjen	1,289	0.9	▼0.8	1,321	0.9	▼0.5
Tierschutzpartei					1,250	0.9	0.0
FW					392	0.3	
PBC					190	0.1	
PRO					165	0.1	
REP					90	0.1	
MLPD					58	0.0	0.0
Informal votes		1,502			1,708		
Total valid votes		143,421			143,215		
Turnout		144,923	74.8	▲0.5			
CDU hold	Majority	9,514	6.6	▲6.1			

=== 2009 election ===
Federal election (2009): Osterholz – Verden
Notes:	Blue background denotes the winner of the electorate vote. Pink background denotes a candidate elected from their party list. Yellow background denotes an electorate win by a list member, or other incumbent. A ✓ or ✗ denotes status of any incumbent, win or lose respectively.						
Party	Candidate	Votes	%	±%	Party votes	%	±%
CDU	Andreas Mattfeldt	53,070	37.1	▲2.5	45,908	32.0	▲2.1
SPD	Joachim Stünker	52,397	36.6	▼11.9	41,979	29.2	▼14.4
Greens	Heiner Haase	12,318	8.6	▲2.1	17,053	11.9	▲2.8
Left	Herbert Behrens	12,242	8.5	▲4.4	13,830	9.6	▲4.6
FDP	Tim Schardelmann	10,787	7.5	▲2.9	17,889	12.5	▲3.3
NPD	Rigolf Hennig	2,417	1.7	0.0	1,981	1.4	▼0.2
Pirates					2,339	1.6	
Tierschutzpartei					1,228	0.9	▲0.2
RRP					976	0.7	
DVU					187	0.1	
ÖDP					152	0.1	
MLPD					24	0.0	0.0
Informal votes		1,642			1,337		
Total valid votes		143,241			143,546		
Turnout		144,883	75.3	▼4.8			
CDU win new seat	Majority	683	0.5				
