= Etelsen Tierpark =

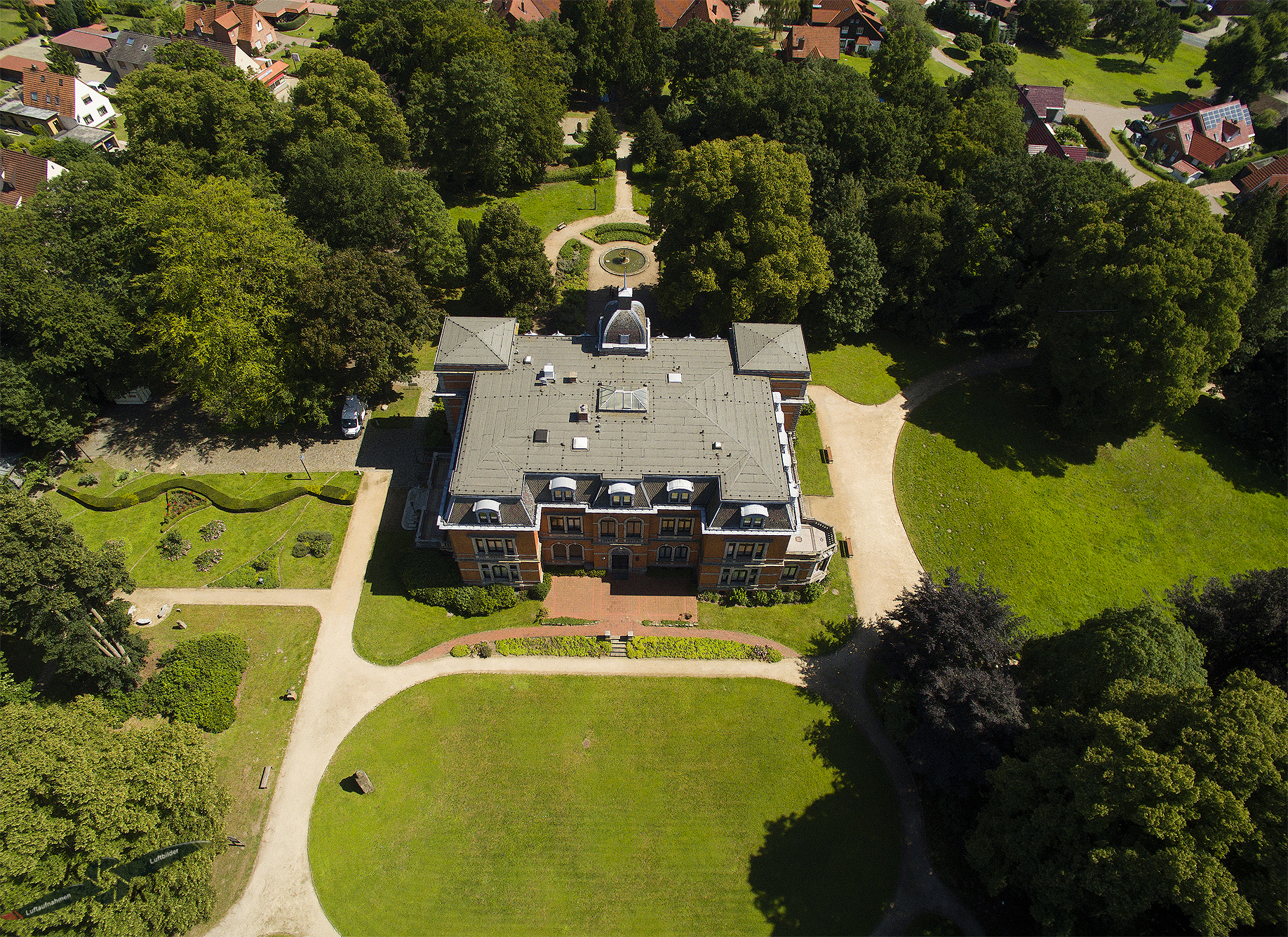
- Interactive map of Etelsen Tierpark
- 52°59′43″N 9°6′45″E
- Date opening: 1959
- Date closed: 1965
- Location: Grosse Strasse 1, Etelsen, Langwedel, Verden, Niedersachsen, Germany
- Land area: 11 hectares (27.2 acres)
- No. of species: 39
- Owner: Alwin Trey from Bremen
- Website: www.etelsen.de/inform/schloss.htm

The Etelsen Tierpark was a small zoo in the castle park of in Etelsen, Langwedel, Verden, Niedersachsen, Germany.

The Zoo and a restaurant was founded in 1959 on the 11 hectares (27.2 acres) park. The first lions were housed in the Mausoleum.

At least 4 elephants were kept in the Zoo, and one died there. The elephants were walked through Etelsen for delivery in the Zoo.

The Zoo was closed in 1965.

== See also ==
- List of zoos in Germany
