= League of Expellees =

Federation or League of Expellees can refer to the following German organizations:

- League of Expellees and Deprived of Rights
- Federation of Expellees
