= Hans-Joachim von Merkatz =

German politician (1905–1982)

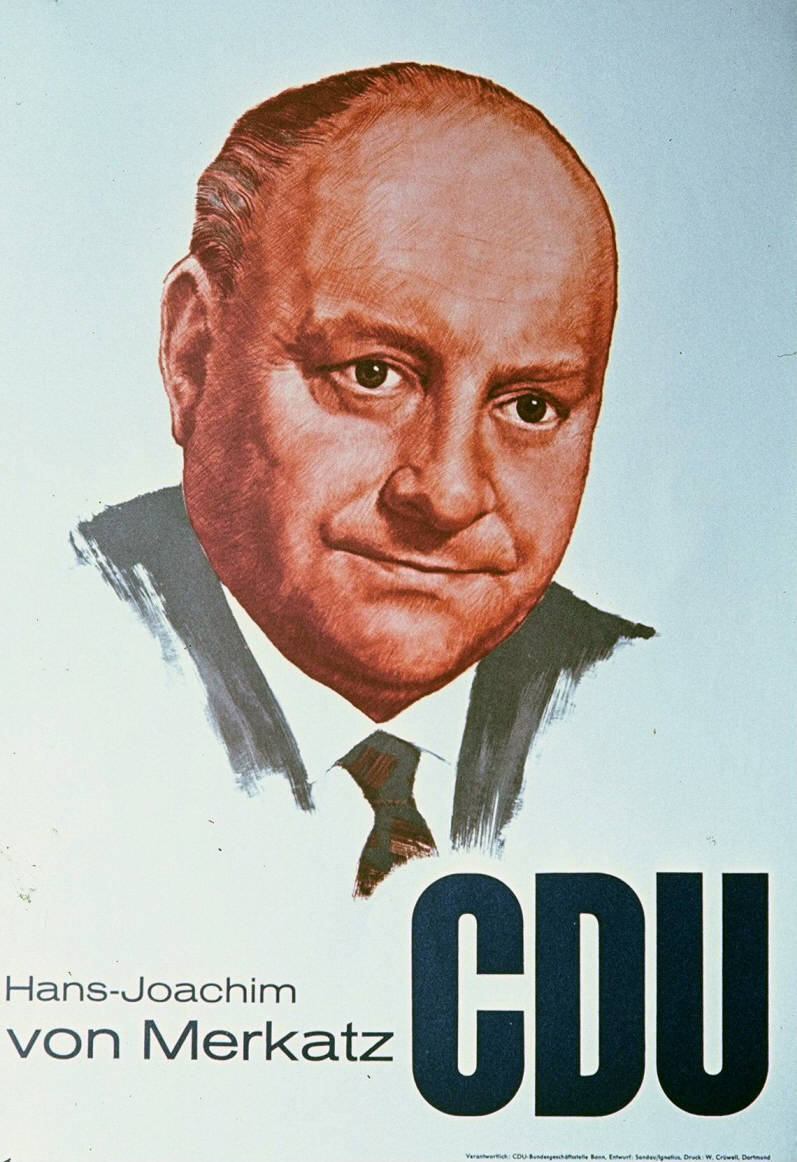
- Merkatz on a 1961 CDU election poster

Minister for Bundesrat Affairs
- In office 26 May 1955 – 13 December 1962
- Chancellor: Konrad Adenauer
- Preceded by: Heinrich Hellwege
- Succeeded by: Alois Niederalt

Minister for Displaced Persons, Refugees and War Victims
- In office 27 October 1960 – 14 November 1961
- Chancellor: Konrad Adenauer
- Preceded by: Theodor Oberländer
- Succeeded by: Wolfgang Mischnick

Minister of Justice
- In office 16 October 1956 – 29 October 1957
- Chancellor: Konrad Adenauer
- Preceded by: Fritz Neumayer
- Succeeded by: Fritz Schäffer

Member of the Bundestag; from Lower Saxony
- In office 7 September 1949 – 20 October 1969
- Preceded by: Constituency established
- Succeeded by: Karl Ravens
- Constituency: Verden – Rotenburg – Osterholz (1949–1961); State list (1961–1965); Verden (1965–1969)

Personal details
- Born: Hans Joachim Benno Hermann Gustav Oskar von Merkatz; 7 July 1905 Stargard, Pomerania, Germany
- Died: 25 February 1982 (aged 76) Bonn, West Germany
- Party: Christian Democratic Union (after 1960)
- Other political affiliations: DP (1947–1960)
- Spouse: Margarete Müller (m. 1937)
- Children: 2
- Education: University of Jena
- Profession: Lawyer, politician

Hans-Joachim von Merkatz (7 July 1905 – 25 February 1982) was a German politician. He was Federal Minister of Justice from 1956 to 1957. He was a member of the Bundestag from 1949 to 1961. He was a member of the German Party before joining the Christian Democratic Union in 1960.

== Early life ==
Merkatz was born at Stargard in the Prussian province of Pomerania into a family of Prussian officers and functionaries, ennobled in 1797. His father, a Hauptmann (Captain) in the Imperial German Army, died near Vilnius in 1915, on the Eastern Front of World War I. Merkatz received his primary education in Wiesbaden (Hesse), Jena and Naumburg (both in Thuringia). Initially immatriculated for agriculture, he turned to study law and national economics at the University of Jena from 1928 to 1931.

== Third Reich ==
Merkatz received his doctorate at the University of Jena in 1934 and his approbation as a lawyer in 1935. The same year, von Merkatz started lecturing foreign and international law at the Kaiser Wilhelm Society in Berlin. In 1938, he became secretary general of both the Ibero-American Institute and the German-Spanish Society, both in Berlin. The German-Spanish Society, founded in 1918, was concerned with the public relations to Spain. Since the Nazi take-over of 1933, the society was increasingly incorporated into the Nazi propaganda apparatus, and used to propagate the New Order ideology.

When World War II broke out in 1939, he was drafted into Wehrmacht service, but retired in 1941 due to a severe illness. He then continued to work at his post in Berlin, until the Soviet Red Army advanced towards Berlin. The final stages of the war had confronted Merkatz with decreasing loyalty to the Axis powers in Spain and seizure of Eastern Germany by the Soviets. He nevertheless remained confident in the final succession of the New Order and in the ability of the German forces to repel and avenge the Soviet forces. During the Battle of Berlin, Merkatz's parents-in-law were killed by Soviet forces in Wusterwitz (Brandenburg), and the family fled westward to settle in Hämelschenburg near Emmerthal (Lower Saxony). The experiences during the final days of the war manifested a strong sense of anti-Communism in Merkatz's personality.

== Post-war period ==
After the war, Merkatz became an employee at the Academy for Area Planning, Hanover, in 1945. He joined the conservative German Party (DP, Deutsche Partei), and acted as its legal consultant from 1946 to 1949. He was voted into the West German federal parliament, Bundestag, in 1949, and remained a Member of Parliament until 1961. From 1949 to 1952, he was Secretary of State in the Federal Ministry for Affairs of the Federal Council (BMBR, Bundesministerium für Angelegenheiten des Bundesrates). From 1950 to 1955, he was vice chairman of the DP Bundestag fraction, and its chairman from 1953 to 1955.

From 1951 to 1958, Merkatz was a member of the Consultative Assembly of the Council of Europe, and from 1952 to 1958, of the Common Assembly of the European Coal and Steel Community. (Note: Both the Consultative and Common Assemblies were the predecessors of the modern European Parliament.) From 1952 to 1960, he was a member of the directorate and the party executive committee of the DP. From 1955 to 1961, he was Federal Minister for Affairs of the Federal Council.

Merkatz was appointed Federal Minister of Justice on 16 October 1956, and remained in that office until 29 October 1957. In October 1957, Merkatz was the focus of an East German propaganda campaign, which portrayed him as a "fascist" and "leading Nazi functionary". The campaign was, however, mounted untimely: due to a re-arrangement of the ruling coalition after the 1957 West German federal election in September, Merkatz resigned from his office. He was replaced by former minister for finance, Fritz Schäffer.

In 1960, Merkatz left the German Party to become a member of the Christian Democratic Union (CDU, Christlich Demokratische Union). He was Federal Minister for Expellees, Refugees and War Invalids (Bundesminister für Vertriebene, Flüchtlinge und Kriegsgeschädigte) from 1960 to 1961, and the West German representative in the Executive Council of the UNESCO.

== Conservative movements ==
In a Bundestag speech of 1951, Merkatz avowed himself as a monarchist. He also upheld his contacts to Franco's Spain and joined the European Documentation and Information Centre (CEDI). President of its German faction, Merkatz was in close personal contact with Otto von Habsburg, president of the CEDI. In 1956, he joined the Central Council of von Habsburg's International Paneuropean Union, and was president of its German faction from 1967 to 1979. In his own words, von Merkatz's political aim was the "conservative rebirth of the Christian occident", (Note: "...die konservative Wiedergeburt des christlichen Abendlandes." Hans-Joachim von Merkatz as cited in Conze (2005), p. 157.) whereby conservativism was understood by him not as an eligible political concept, but as an integral feature of personality. Merkatz was a founding member of the Abendländische Akademie ("Occidental Academy"), a Christian-conservative circle operating since 1952.

In February 1956, the Abendländische Akademie became subject to a press campaign initiated by Der Spiegel, claiming the academy's activities were in violation of the German constitution. This resulted in investigation by a parliamentary commission and the eventual decline of the academy. During the affair, Merkatz as one of the academy's leading persons rejected the claims of disobedience to the constitution, but added that because it was rooted in "secular morality", it was "incomplete" for the "conservative mind".

== Death ==
Hans-Joachim von Merkatz died in Bonn on 25 February 1982.

== Bibliography ==
- Conze, Vanessa (2005). "Wurzeln abendländischen Engagements in biographischen Erfahrungen". Das Europa der Deutschen: Ideen von Europa in Deutschland zwischen Reichstradition und Westorientierung (1920-1970) (in German). Oldenbourg Wissenschaftsverlag. ISBN 3-486-57757-3.
- von Miquel, Marc (2004). "Justiz und NS-Vergangenheit 1957-1965". Ahnden oder amnestieren? Westdeutsche Justiz und Vergangenheitspolitik in den sechziger Jahren (in German). Wallstein Verlag. ISBN 3-89244-748-9.
- Schildt, Axel (1999). "Gründung und Blütezeit der Abendländischen Akademie (1952-1955)". Zwischen Abendland und Amerika: Studien zur westdeutschen Ideenlandschaft der 50er Jahre (in German). Oldenbourg Wissenschaftsverlag. ISBN 3-486-56344-0.
- Schmerbach, Folker (2008). Das "Gemeinschaftslager Hanns Kerrl" für Referendare in Jüterbog 1933-1939 (in German). Mohr Siebeck. ISBN 978-3-16-149585-4.
- Bundesregierung (Federal government of Germany) (1999). Rössel, Uta; Weber, Hartmut (eds.). Die Kabinettsprotokolle der Bundesregierung: Kabinettsausschuß für Wirtschaft (in German). Oldenbourg Wissenschaftsverlag. ISBN 3-486-57917-7.
