= Joachim Stünker =

German politician (born 1948)

Member of the Bundestag
- In office 26 October 1998 – 27 October 2009
- Preceded by: Eva Schlaugat
- Succeeded by: Andreas Mattfeldt
- Constituency: Verden – Osterholz (1998–2002); Rotenburg – Verden (2002–2009)

Honorary Mayor of Langwedel
- In office 1984–2001

Personal details
- Born: 29 March 1948 (age 78) Langwedel, Germany
- Party: Social Democratic
- Children: 2
- Education: Free University of Berlin; University of Göttingen

Joachim Stünker (born 29 March 1948) is a German politician and member of the Social Democratic Party of Germany (SPD). He was a member of the German Bundestag from 1998 to 2009, where he was a legal policy spokesman for the SPD parliamentary group 2002 to 2009.

== Education ==
After graduating from the Gymnasium am Wall in Verden/Aller in 1967, Stünker studied law at the Free University of Berlin and the Georg August University of Göttingen, which he completed in 1973 with the first state law examination. After completing his legal clerkship, he passed the second state examination in 1975 and has since worked as a judge, since 1990 as presiding judge at the District Court of Verden.

== Political career ==
Stünker joined the SPD as a schoolboy in 1965. He has been a member of the local council of his birthplace Langwedel since 1976 and of the district council of the Verden district since 1986. For 17 years (until 2001) he was honorary mayor of the district of Langwedel.

From 1998 to 2009, he was a member of the German Bundestag. After initially serving as deputy speaker from 1998 to 2002, he became spokesman for the legal policy working group of the SPD parliamentary group in October 2002. He was a member of the executive committee of the SPD parliamentary group from November 2004 to November 2005 and from October 2007 until he left the Bundestag after the 2009 Bundestag elections. Stünker was also a member of the Bundestag's Parliamentary Oversight Panel, which monitors the work of the intelligence services.

Stünker is one of the authors of the 2009 living will law, the so-called "Stünker draft" in effect since September 2009.

Joachim Stünker has always entered the Bundestag as a directly elected member of the electoral district of Verden - Osterholz or, since 2002, of the electoral district of Rotenburg - Verden. In the 2005 Bundestag election, he achieved 44.2% of the first-past-the-post votes here. In the 2009 Bundestag election, he achieved a result of 36.6%, narrowly losing out to his rival Andreas Mattfeldt (CDU) by less than 0.5 percentage points. Since Stünker was also unable to enter the Bundestag via the SPD's state list, he left the Bundestag. He declared his political career over.

Stünker returned to his position at the Verden Regional Court and retired in May 2014.
