= Herbert Behrens =

Herbert Behrens may refer to:

- Herbert Behrens (politician)
- Herbert Behrens (tennis)
