= Federal Ministry of Displaced Persons, Refugees and War Victims =

The Federal Ministry of Displaced Persons, Refugees and War Victims (German: Bundesministerium für Vertriebene, Flüchtlinge und Kriegsgeschädigte; BMVt) was part of the West German federal government from 1949 till 1969.

Before the formation of the Federal Republic of Germany on the territory of the three western (American, British and French) allied zones, the individual state governments were in charge of the care for displaced persons. Initially the Office for Displaced Persons (German: Amt für Heimatvertriebene) was formed for the social policy task of coordinating the integration of displaced persons and refugees, caring for war victims and providing compensation and initial aid. When the new ministry was formed in September 1949 after the parliamentary elections, it took over this office.

The first minister was Hans Lukaschek, member of the Bundestag for the Christian Democratic Union (CDU) and former president of the Zentralverband vertriebener Deutscher, an organisation of displaced Germans. Before the war he was responsible for organising propaganda against the Poles in Upper Silesia. He had eight successors, until in 1969 the ministry was dissolved and its competences were distributed among other federal ministries. The ministry was target of several scandals and controversies as Lukaschek's successor Theodor Oberländer was a former active Nazi, responsible for supporting ethnic cleansing of Jews and Poles and forced to resign due to his Nazi past. Another minister, Hans Krüger, also a former Nazi, was also forced to resign after his involvement in atrocities in occupied Poland was revealed. As for Lukaschek, it was speculated that his departure was the result of intrigues made by former Nazis

The ministry initially drafted the Lastenausgleichsgesetz and the Bundesvertriebenengesetz (passed in 1952 and 1953, respectively). These laws became the basis of its further activities.

The ministry also mandated a multi-volume documentation of the expulsion of Germans after World War II (Dokumentation der Vertreibung der Deutschen aus Ost-Mitteleuropa), which was prepared by a large scientific commission led by former Nazi activist Theodor Schieder. The research project took roughly ten years to complete. A crucial role in this commission was played by the Königsberger Kreis led by former Nazis Theodor Schieder and Werner Conze as well as nationalist historian Hans Rothfels; it had previously provided ideological justifications for the Third Reich's aggressive eastbound Volkstum politics.

== Ministers ==
Political Party: CDU GB/BHE FDP

Name (Born-Died)	Portrait	Party	Term of Office		Chancellor (Cabinet)
Federal Minister for Displaced Persons Affairs (1949–1954) Federal Minister for Displaced Persons, Refugees and War Victims (1954–1969)
Hans Lukaschek (1885–1960)		CDU	20 September 1949	20 October 1953	Adenauer (I)
Theodor Oberländer (1905–1998)		GB/BHE (1950–1955); CDU (from 1955)	20 October 1953	4 May 1960	Adenauer (II • III)
Hans-Joachim von Merkatz (1905–1982)		CDU	27 October 1960	14 November 1961	Adenauer (III)
Wolfgang Mischnick (1921–2002)		FDP	14 November 1961	15 October 1963	Adenauer (IV • V)
Hans Krüger (1902–1971)		CDU	17 October 1963	7 February 1964	Erhard (I)
Ernst Lemmer (1898–1970)		CDU	19 February 1964	26 October 1965	Erhard (I)
Johann Baptist Gradl (1904–1988)		CDU	26 October 1965	1 December 1966	Erhard (II)
Kai-Uwe von Hassel (1913–1997)		CDU	1 December 1966	5 February 1969	Kiesinger (I)
Heinrich Windelen (1921–2015)		CDU	7 February 1969	21 October 1969	Kiesinger (I)
