= Hans Lukaschek =

German lawyer and politician (1885–1960

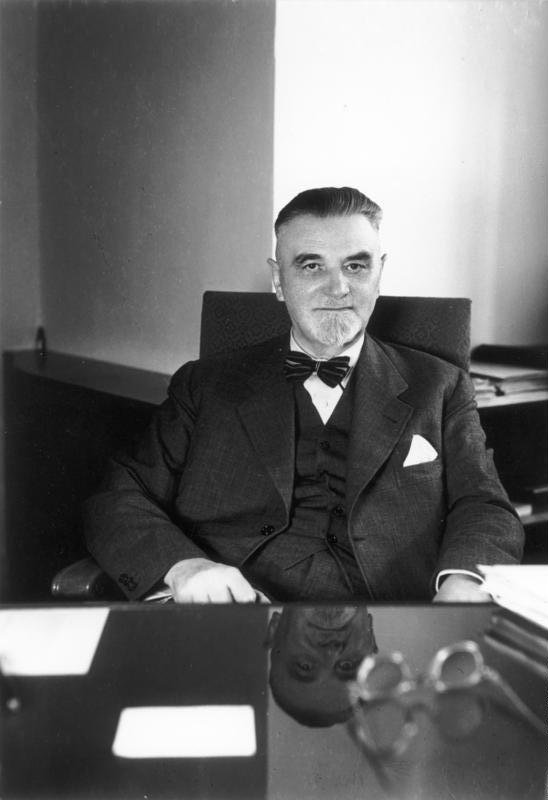

Minister of Displaced Persons, Refugees and War Victims
- In office 20 September 1949 – 6 October 1953
- Preceded by: Position created
- Succeeded by: Theodor Oberländer

Oberpräsident, Province of Upper Silesia
- In office February 1929 – 19 May 1933
- Preceded by: Alfons Proske
- Succeeded by: Helmuth Brückner

Personal details
- Born: 22 May 1885 Breslau, Lower Silesia, German Empire
- Died: 26 January 1960 (aged 74) Freiburg im Breisgau, West Germany
- Party: Center Party; Christian Democrats
- Education: Doctor of Law
- Alma mater: University of Breslau; Humboldt University of Berlin
- Occupation: Lawyer; Politician

Hans Lukaschek (22 May 1885 – 26 January 1960) was a German lawyer and politician. During the German Empire and the Weimar Republic, he was active as a member of the Center Party, serving as a mayor, a district administrator and the Oberpräsident of the Province of Upper Silesia. Removed from office by the Nazis, he joined the anti-Nazi resistance and was arrested after the failed 20 July plot to assassinate Adolf Hitler. Released in April 1945 near the end of World War II in Europe, he became a member of the West German government as minister for refugees and displaced persons in Konrad Adenauer's first cabimet from 1949 to 1953.

== Early life and education ==
Lukaschek, was born 1885 in Breslau (now Wrocław, Poland), the son of a scool teacher. After receiving his Abitur in 1906, he studied law, political science and economics at the universities of Breslau and Berlin. He obtained his Doctor of Law degree in 1910, passed the final state law exammination in 1914, worked at the Imperial Patent Office and transferred to the municipal administration of Breslau as an Assessor. Lukaschek began his political career in the Catholic Center Party and, from 1916 to 1919, he served as the Bürgermeister (mayor) of the town of Rybnik in Upper Silesia.

== Career in the Weimar Republic ==
After the end of the First World War, Lukaschek briefly served as the Landrat (district administrator) of the predominantly Polish-speaking district of Rybnik in southeastern Upper Silesia from 1919 to 1920. He had to relinquish this office on the orders of the Inter-Allied Plebiscite Commission, which assumed governmental authority in the area in preparation for the 1921 Upper Silesia plebiscite, authorized by the Treaty of Versailles.

Lukaschek served as German propaganda chief for the Upper Silesia plebiscite. He headed a committee that investigated all possibilities to engage in plebiscite propaganda. The Silesian Committee was to create common propaganda themes to which all factions could subscribe, and was helped in its task by money from the German government. Lukaschek's propaganda actions were also sponsored by state finances. He remained in Polish Silesia till 1927, officially as a member of a mixed Polish-German Commission organised under the auspices of League of Nations, while in secret he organised a spy network for Germany in Polish Upper Silesia during that time. When the network was discovered in 1926–27, Polish minister Zaleski asked the commission for cancellation of Lukaschek's position. Lukaschek offered his resignation in Berlin, and after being rejected the first time, he offered it a second time, stating that he was no longer able to conduct his mission.

In March 1927, Lukaschek was elected Oberbürgermeister of Hindenburg (today, Zabrze) in Upper Silesia. In 1929, he was appointed as the Oberpräsident of the Prussian Province of Upper Silesia and also as the Regierungspräsident of the Oppeln district. In this role, he was active against the Poles in his region; after a Polish school was opened in Bytom, he sent a letter to the German government claiming that it represented a threat to German interests, and ordered close surveillance of both teachers and Polish pupils. As a state official, Lukaschek tried to conceal his anti-Polish stance, while discreetly opposing the reconciliation between Poles and Germans pursued by some German Catholic and pacifist organisations in his region.

After the Nazi seizure of power, Lukaschek was removed from office in May 1933, and returned to the practice of law in Breslau in which he defended many of those persecuted by the new regime, including Jews. He joined the anti-Nazi resistance network, the Kreisau Circle, which was established by Helmuth James von Moltke around 1940. The Gestapo arrested Lukaschek after the assassination attempt on Hitler on 20 July 1944. The plotters who wanted to remove Hitler from power, but also to keep Poland occupied by Germany and restore the 1914 borders, had planned to make Lukaschek the governor of Silesia. He was taken to Ravensbrück concentration camp in September 1944. On 19 April 1945, however, the People's Court acquitted him and he was released.

== Post-war life ==
After the war, Lukaschek joined the Christian Democrats in the Soviet occupation zone and became a minister in Thuringia before he fled to the Allied occupation zones in 1947. In April of the following year, he was appointed vice president of the British and US zones' supreme court. From 1949 to 1953, he headed the Federal Ministry of Displaced Persons, Refugees and War Victims in the West German government of Konrad Adenauer. In August 1952, Lukaschek was reported by the British press as saying that "Germany's former eastern territories, including those occupied by Czechoslovakia will become German again," the paper naming him a "neo-nationalist voice". He was also an honorary chairman of the General Association for the Protection of Officials, an organisation focused on the interests of those who managed to successfully pass the denazification process, and which was engaged in vigorous propaganda on behalf of Germans expelled from central and eastern Europe. Lukashek was also engaged in convincing the German ministry of finance to provide 350 million marks annually by the West German state for former officials of Nazi Germany.

== Sources ==
- Edward Długajczyk, "Afera szpiegowska Hansa Lukaschka z przełomu lat 1926/1927" in Historia i archiwistyka. Studia z dziejów Polski, Polonii i archiwistyki. Księga dedykowana księdzu doktorowi Romanowi Nirowi" editor: Faryś, Janusz Gorzów Wielkopolski 2004, pp. 71–87
- Wywiad polski na Górnym Śląsku 1919-1922 Edward Długajczyk, Muzeum Śląskie, 2001
