= Brzostów =

- Village
- Location within Poland
- Coordinates: 51°58′N 17°26′E
- Country: Poland
- Voivodeship: Greater Poland
- County: Jarocin
- Gmina: Jaraczewo
- Population: 258

Brzostów [ˈbʐɔstuf] is a village in the administrative district of Gmina Jaraczewo, within Jarocin County, Greater Poland Voivodeship, in west-central Poland.

== Notable residents ==
- Waldemar Kraft (1898-1977), German politician
