= Karl Ravens =

German politician (1927–2017)

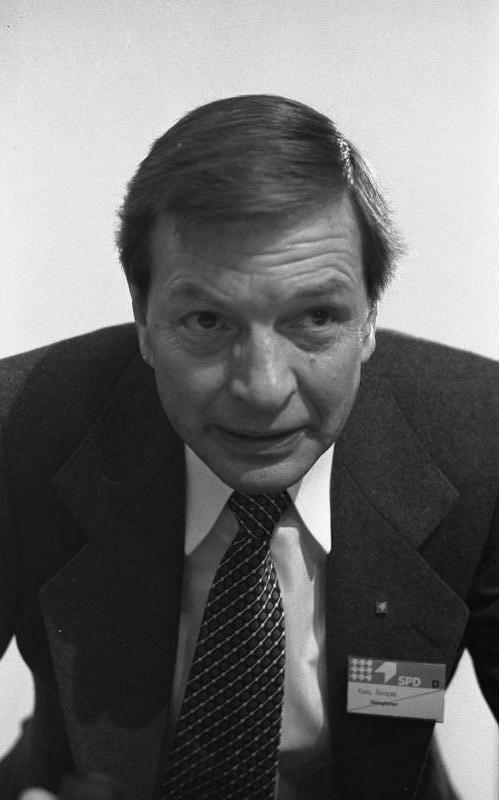
- Ravens in 1978

Minister for Regional Planning, Building and Urban Development
- In office 16 May 1974 – 16 February 1978
- Chancellor: Helmut Schmidt
- Preceded by: Hans-Jochen Vogel
- Succeeded by: Dieter Haack

Member of the Bundestag; from Lower Saxony
- In office 17 October 1961 – 15 June 1978
- Preceded by: Hans-Joachim von Merkatz
- Succeeded by: Volker Neumann
- Constituency: Verden – Rotenburg – Osterholz (1961–1965); State list (1965–1969); Verden (1969–1978)

Personal details
- Born: 29 June 1927 Achim, Germany
- Died: 8 September 2017 (aged 90) Hanover, Germany
- Party: Social Democratic
- Children: 1

Karl Ravens (29 June 1927 – 8 September 2017) was a German politician and member of the Social Democratic Party of Germany (SPD). He served as the Federal Minister of Regional Planning, Construction and Urban Development for West Germany from 1974 to 1978.

Ravens died on 8 September 2017, at the age of 90.
