= Lena Gumnior =

German politician

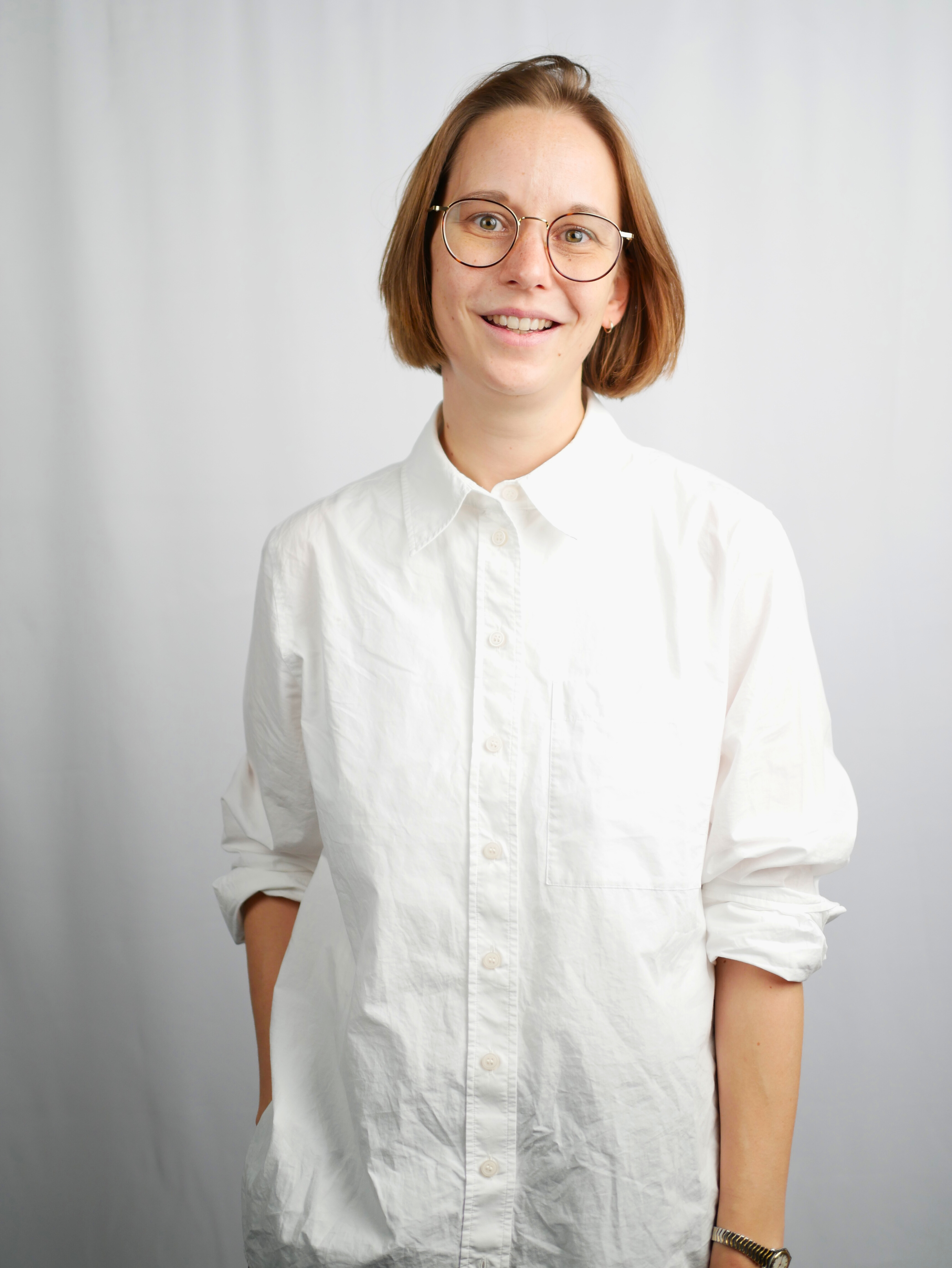

Member of the Bundestag
- Incumbent
- Assumed office 2025

Personal details
- Born: 10 December 1992 (age 33)
- Party: Alliance 90/The Greens
- Education: University of Münster; European University Viadrina

Lena Maria Gumnior (born December 10, 1992, in Rheine) is a German lawyer and politician of the Alliance 90/The Greens who has been serving as a member of the German Bundestag since the 2025 German federal election, representing the Osterholz – Verden district.

== Early life and career ==
Gunmior studied law at University of Münster. During her studies she worked as research assistant at Leibniz University Hannover and European University Viadrina.

In 2024, Gunmior briefly worked as lawyer at Gleiss Lutz's Berlin office.

== Political career ==
In parliament, Gunmior has been serving on the Committee on Legal Affairs and Consumer Protection and its Subcommittee on European Affairs.
