= Waldemar Kraft =

German politician (1898–1977)

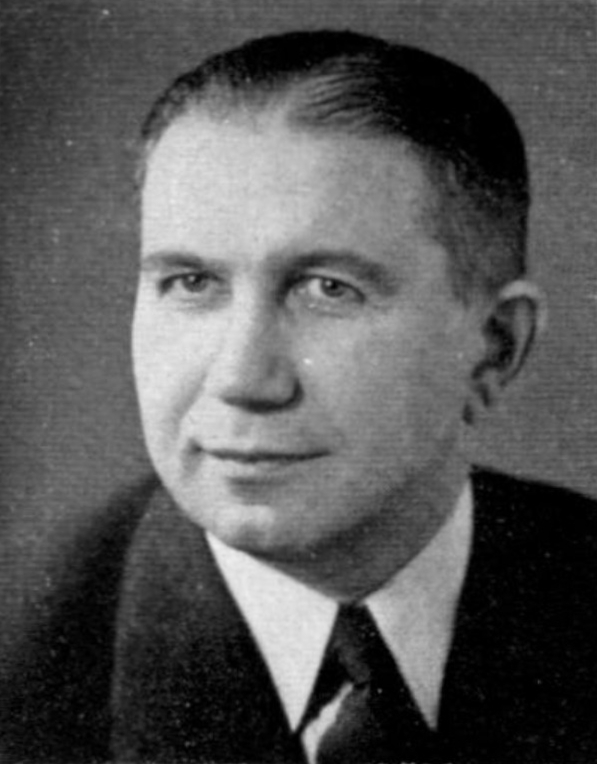
- Kraft c. 1953

Managing Director of the Reich Association for Land Management in the Annexed Territories
- In office 1940–1945

Federal Minister for Special Affairs
- In office 1953–1956

Schleswig-Holstein Minister of Finance
- In office 1950–1953

Member of the Bundestag
- In office 1953–1961

Member of the Schleswig-Holstein Parliament for Lauenburg-west
- In office 1950–1953

Personal details
- Born: 19 February 1898 Fischerau, Province of Posen, German Empire
- Died: 12 July 1977 (aged 79) Bonn, West Germany
- Party: National Socialist German Workers' Party (NSDAP); All-German Bloc/League of Expellees and Deprived of Rights (GB/BHE); Christian Democratic Union (CDU)

Waldemar Kraft (19 February 1898 – 12 July 1977) was a German politician. A member of the SS in Nazi Germany, he served as Managing Director of the Reich Association for Land Management in the Annexed Territories from 1940 to 1945, administering parts of occupied Poland.

After the war, he became a West German politician, representing right-wing All-German Bloc/League of Expellees and Deprived of Rights in the Landtag of Schleswig-Holstein from 1950 to 1953, where he served as Minister of Finance. As well, he was the organization's chairman from 1951 to 1954. Kraft entered the Bundestag in 1953, and served as Federal Minister for Special Affairs in the Cabinet of Chancellor Konrad Adenauer from 1953 to 1956. In 1956, he became a member of the Christian Democratic Union, and retired from the Bundestag in 1961.

== Education and profession ==
Waldemar Kraft was born to a Protestant German family in Fischerau, Jarotschin district, in the Province of Posen on the Prussian-Russian border (today Brzostów, Poland). He attended secondary school in pre-1914 Posen, focusing his secondary school studies on agriculture. Between 1915 and 1920 he was a soldier of the Prussian Army and participated in World War I, where he was severely wounded. Afterwards he served as a company commander.

After the war he chose to return to the Greater Poland and from 1921 to 1939 he was the director of the Hauptvereins der Deutschen Bauernvereine or Main German Farmers' Associations in Poznań. In 1925 he was also appointed director of the Deutschen Landwirtschaftlichen Zentralverbandes in Polen or Central Association of German Farming in Poland.

From 1939 to 1940 he served as the regional President of Agriculture (the Landwirtschaftskammer) in Nazi Posen. From 1940 to 1945 he was Managing Director of the Reichsgesellschaft für Landbewirtschaftung in den eingegliederten Ostgebieten mbH („Reichsland“) or Reich Association for land management in the annexed territories, in Berlin. Shortly before the war ended this Reich Association, and Kraft, moved to Ratzeburg in Schleswig-Holstein. From 1945 to 1947 he was interned in Schleswig-Holstein and remained unemployed in Ratzeburg to 1950.

From 1949 to 1951 he was the spokesperson for the Landsmannschaft Weichsel-Warthe or German Vistula and Warta Association. As such he signed the Charter of the German expellees and later became honorary chairman (an Ehrenvorsitzender).

== Political affiliation ==
Kraft joined the NSDAP in 1943 (membership number 9.428.904). On 13 November 1939, immediately following the Nazi invasion of Poland and the incorporation of his region into the Warthegau, he was also appointed an Honorary Captain (Ehren-Hauptsturmführer) of the SS.

In 1950 he was among the founders of the All-German Bloc/League of Expellees and Deprived of Rights (Gesamtdeutscher Block/Bund der Heimatvertriebenen und Entrechteten, often abbreviated as "GB/BHE") in Schleswig-Holstein. In 1951, Kraft was elected as the League's national chairman, and Eva Gräfin Finck von Finckenstein as his press secretary. In September 1954, she was not reelected into the League administrative board, resulting in Kraft's own resignation as Chairman.

In March 1956, Kraft, Finckenstein, and Theodor Oberländer all joined the CDU, which lead to the overall decline of the GB/BHE within German politics.

== Member of the Bundestag ==
From 1950 to 1953 Kraft was a member of the Landtag (state legislature) of Schleswig-Holstein, where he represented the electoral district of Lauenburg-west. From 1953 to 1961 he was subsequently elected a member of the West German Bundestag.

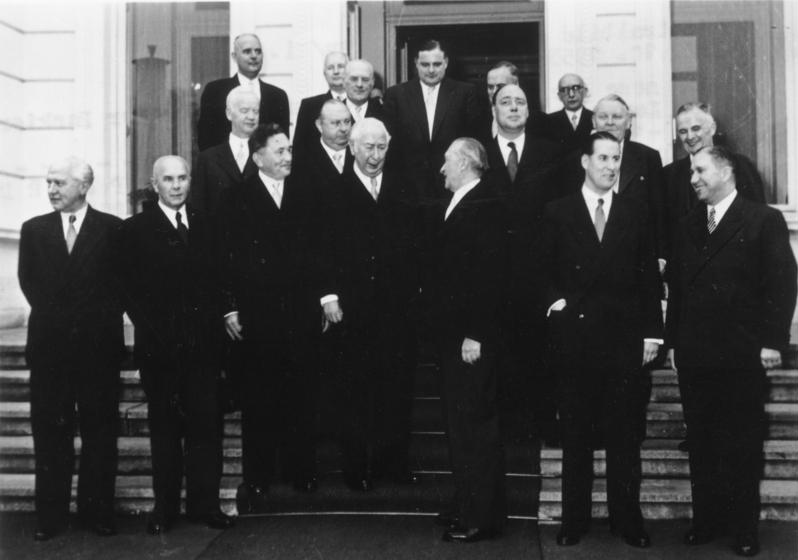
1953. Waldemar Kraft, front row, far right. Part of the West German government under Konrad Adenauer.

After the elections in 1953 he retired on 20 October 1953 from the State Government and was appointed on the same day as the Federal Minister without Portfolio under government of Chancellor Konrad Adenauer in Bonn. On 16 October 1956 he resigned from the federal government.

He died in Bonn in 1977.

== Evaluation ==
An advocate for the rights of Germans expelled from Poland, British historian Richard Grunberger cited him as an example of the permeation or infiltration of SS attitudes and values into mainstream postwar West German society and politics. Kraft's organization included many former Nazis, such as Wilhelm Schepmann and Hans Krueger (alongside Kraft himself).

In regards to his involvement in the SS, it is unclear whether Kraft volunteered for the SS-Ehrenführer post at his own initiative, or whether he was pressured to do so by his immediate superiors. Both the Minister for Agriculture, Richard Walther Darré, and the Gauleiter of Warthegau, Arthur Greiser, were senior and important SS officers and that may have influenced Kraft.

== See also ==
- List of German Christian Democratic Union politicians

== Literature ==
- Rainer Salzmann, Kraft, Waldemar. In: Neue Deutsche Biographie (NDB). Band 12, Duncker & Humblot, Berlin 1980, p. 655/656.
- Waldemar Kraft. In: Kanzler und Minister 1949-1998. Biografisches Lexikon der deutschen Bundesregierungen, ed. by Udo Kempf and Hans-Georg Merz, Wiesbaden: Westdeutscher Verlag, 2001, pp. 380–384.
- Richard Grunberger, Hitler's SS (1970), page.114.
- "Schütze Kraft" in Der Spiegel (19 May 1954)
