= Erwin Oberländer =

German historian (born 1937)

- Born: 19 March 1937 (age 89)
- Citizenship: (Germany) German
- Education: Ludwig-Maximilians-Universität München, University of Vienna, University of Cologne
- Scientific career
- Fields: Eastern European history
- Workplaces: University of Münster, University of Mainz

Erwin Oberländer (born 19 March 1937) is a German historian and expert on Eastern European history. He is Professor Emeritus of Eastern European History at the University of Mainz. He is also a former President of the German Association of Historians of Eastern Europe, and was appointed by the Latvian government as a foreign member of the Commission of the Historians of Latvia, which was tasked with studying crimes against humanity in Latvia during the Soviet and Nazi occupations.

== Biography ==
He studied history at the Ludwig-Maximilians-Universität München, the University of Vienna, and the University of Cologne from 1956, and earned a doctorate in 1963. He was employed at the Federal Institute for Eastern and International Studies from 1963 to 1974, and earned his Habilitation in 1972. He was appointed as Professor at the University of Cologne in 1973, and was a senior advisor in the culture department of the Federal Ministry of the Interior from 1974 to 1975, where he was responsible for research on Eastern European affairs.

From 1975 to 1985, he was Professor of Modern Eastern European History at the University of Münster and served as Dean at the Faculty of History from 1976 to 1977. Subsequently, he was Professor of Eastern European History and head of the Institute for Eastern European History at the University of Mainz from 1985 to 2002. He also served as Dean of the Faculty of History from 1990 to 1992.

== Personal ==
He is the son of Theodor Oberländer, a Nazi party member and alleged war criminal. Theodor Oberländer was a German CDU politician and former Federal Minister until he was pushed out of the party for advocating far-right causes. Theodor was also a leader of the All-German Bloc/League of Expellees and Deprived of Rights, a political party that resisted denazification. Theodor advocated for the ethnic cleansing of Poland and participated in the organization of anti-partisan actions, for which he was investigated by German prosecutors as late as 1996.

== Honours ==
- 1993: Honorary doctor of the University of Riga (Latvia)
- 2008: Elected member of the Latvian Academy of Sciences
- 2017: Cross of Recognition (IV Class)

== Bibliography ==
- 1965: Tolstoj und die revolutionäre Bewegung. Pustet, Munich/Salzburg/Vienna.
- 1967: Sowjetpatriotismus und Geschichte. Dokumentation (= Dokumente zum Studium des Kommunismus. Vol. 4). Verlag Wissenschaft und Politik, Cologne.
- 1967: with Frits Kool: Arbeiterdemokratie oder Parteidiktatur (= Dokumente der Weltrevolution. Vol. 2). Walter, Olten/Freiburg im Breisgau.
- 1971: Zur Antizionismuskampagne in der UdSSR. Bundesinstitut für Ostforschung und Internationale Studien, Cologne.
- 1972: Der Anarchismus. Zur Theorie und Praxis der herrschaftslosen Gesellschaft (= Dokumente der Weltrevolution. Vol. 4). Walter, Olten/Freiburg im Breisgau, ISBN 3-530-16784-3.
- 1976: Die Ukrainische Sozialistische Sowjetrepublik 1969. Bundesinstitut für Ostforschung und Internationale Studien, Cologne.
- 1989: Hitler-Stalin-Pakt 1939. Das Ende Ostmitteleuropas? Fischer-Taschenbuch-Verlag, Frankfurt am Main, ISBN 3-596-24434-X.
- 1991: Geschichte Osteuropas. Zur Entwicklung einer historischen Disziplin in Deutschland, Österreich und der Schweiz 1945–1990 (= Quellen und Studien zur Geschichte des östlichen Europa. Vol. 35). Steiner, Stuttgart, ISBN 3-515-06024-3.
- 1993: Genossenschaften in Osteuropa – Alternative zur Planwirtschaft? Deutscher Genossenschafts-Verlag, Wiesbaden 1993.
- 1993: Polen nach dem Kommunismus. Steiner, Stuttgart, ISBN 3-515-06213-0.
- 1993/2001: Das Herzogtum Kurland 1561–1795. Verfassung, Wirtschaft, Gesellschaft. 2 vols. Verlag Nordostdeutsches Kulturwerk, Lüneburg, ISBN 3-922296-72-6, ISBN 3-932267-33-8.
- 2001: Autoritäre Regime in Ostmittel- und Südosteuropa 1919–1944. Schöningh, Paderborn, ISBN 3-506-76186-2.
- 2004: with Kristine Wohlfahrt: Riga. Porträt einer Vielvölkerstadt am Rande des Zarenreichs 1857–1914. Schöningh, Paderborn, ISBN 3-506-71738-3.
- 2008: with Volker Keller: Kurland. Vom polnisch-litauischen Lehnsherzogtum zur Russischen Provinz. Dokumente zur Verfassungsgeschichte 1561–1795. Schöningh, Paderborn, ISBN 978-3-506-76536-9.
