= Theodor Oberländer =

German scientist and politician (1905–1998)

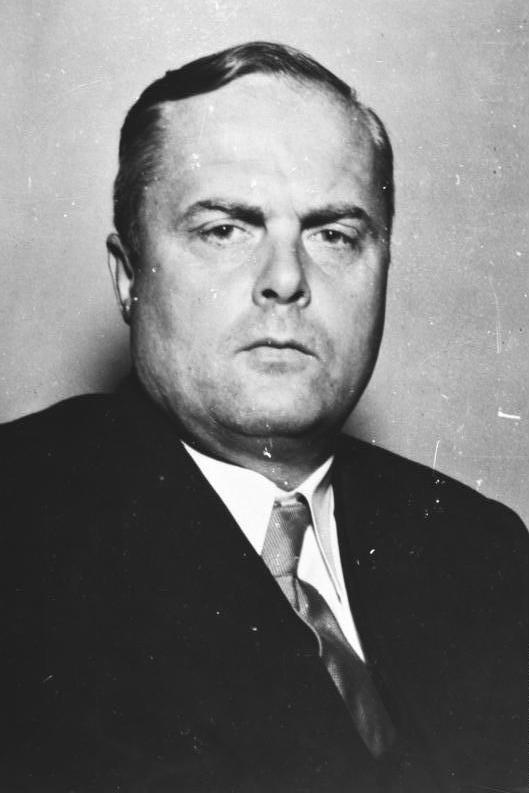
- Oberländer in 1952

Minister for Displaced Persons, Refugees and Victims of War
- In office 20 October 1953 – 4 May 1960
- Chancellor: Konrad Adenauer
- Preceded by: Hans Lukaschek
- Succeeded by: Hans-Joachim von Merkatz

Member of the Bundestag
- In office 9 May 1963 – 19 October 1965
- Preceded by: Elisabeth Vietje
- Succeeded by: Multi-member district
- Constituency: Lower Saxony state list
- In office 6 October 1953 – 17 October 1961
- Preceded by: Multi-member district
- Succeeded by: Friedrich Kühn
- Constituency: Bavaria state list (1953–1957); Hildesheim-Stadt und -Land (1957–1961)

Member of the Landtag of Bavaria; for Swabia
- In office 11 December 1950 – 24 October 1953
- Preceded by: Multi-member district
- Succeeded by: Hans Peterlik

Personal details
- Born: Theodor Erich Ernst Emil Otto Oberländer; 5 January 1905 Meiningen, Germany
- Died: 19 April 1998 (aged 93) Bonn, Germany
- Party: Christian Democratic Union (after 1956)
- Other political affiliations: NSDAP (1933–1945); FDP (1948–1950); GB/BHE (1950–1956)
- Education: LMU Munich; University of Hamburg; FWU Berlin; University of Königsberg

Theodor Oberländer (1 May 1905 – 4 May 1998) was an Ostforschung scientist and German Nazi official and politician, who after the Second World War served as Federal Minister for Displaced Persons, Refugees and Victims of War in West Germany from 1953 to 1960, and as a member of the Bundestag from 1953 to 1961 and from 1963 to 1965.

Oberländer earned a doctorate in agriculture in 1929 and a second doctorate in economics in 1930. He spent time in the Soviet Union during the 1920s and early 1930s, including as an employee of DRUSAG (Deutsch-Russische Saatbau AG), a German company involved in developing Soviet agriculture in cooperation with the Soviet government. Subsequently, he became active in Ostforschung, area studies of the Soviet Union, the Baltic states, Poland and other countries of Eastern and Central Europe, advocating elimination of Jews and subjugation of Polish people in Poland, which he characterised in his writings as having "eight million inhabitants too many". In 1933, he became Director of the Institute for East German Economy in Königsberg, and in 1938 he became Professor of Agriculture at the University of Greifswald. He served as a lieutenant in the German military intelligence service (the Abwehr) in the Soviet Union during the Second World War and was promoted to captain of the reserve before his discharge in 1943; in the same year he became Director of the Institute for Economic Sciences. From 1944 he was affiliated with the staff of Andrey Vlasov's collaborationist Russian Liberation Army. He became a member of the Nazi Party in 1933. However, from 1937 until the end of Nazi rule, he was under surveillance by the Sicherheitsdienst (SD), as he was suspected of disloyalty to the Nazi cause. In 1940, he endorsed the ethnic cleansing of Poland. He later became the leader of the mixed German and Ukrainian Nachtigall Battalion, as well as the German-Caucasian Bergmann Battalion (established in October 1941), which were active in anti-partisan warfare. Both groups were later accused of participation in war crimes.

After the war, the Americans held Oberländer as a POW. He worked with the American-sponsored Gehlen intelligence organisation (c. 1946 to 1948) as an expert on Eastern Europe.

He entered politics for the liberal Free Democratic Party from 1948. In 1950, he was a co-founder of the All-German Bloc/League of Expellees and Deprived of Rights and served as its chairman from 1954 to 1955. He served as a member of the Parliament of Bavaria from 1950 to 1953 and as Secretary of State for Refugee Affairs in the Bavarian Ministry of the Interior from 1951 to 1953. He then served as Federal Minister for Displaced Persons, Refugees and Victims of War in the Second and Third Cabinets of Chancellor Konrad Adenauer from 1953 to 1960, and as a Member of the Bundestag from 1953 to 1961 and from 1963 to 1965, during which time he represented Hildesheim from 1957 to 1961. In 1956, Oberländer became a member of the Christian Democratic Union (CDU). Oberländer was one of the most staunch anti-communists in the German government. He received the Grand Cross of Order of Merit of the Federal Republic of Germany, the Bavarian Order of Merit and the Legion of Honour.

== Background and early career ==
Oberländer was born in 1905 in Meiningen, Duchy of Saxe-Meiningen, part of the German Empire, to a Protestant family; his father Oskar Oberländer was a civil servant and director of the insurance agency in Thüringen.

After the First World War, Oberländer was a member of the Gilde Greif (Greif Guild), a student association that emerged from the youth movement. As part of a military exercise in Forstenried, he, aged 18 and other members of the guild took part in Adolf Hitler's Beer Hall Putsch in Munich, Bavaria, on 9 November 1923, during the Weimar Republic era, according to their own admission, “rather by chance”. As a result of this he was imprisoned for four days.

Oberländer then became a member of the right-wing extremist paramilitary association Bund Oberland (Oberland League) and the fiercely antisemitic Deutschvölkischer Schutz- und Trutzbund (German National Defense and Defiance Federation), before finally adhering to the Nazi Party (NSDAP) in 1933 (where he swiftly climbed the ranks, up to the position of Gau Department Leader, becoming one of the functionaries of the Nazi provincial leadership).

From 1923 to 1927, Oberländer studied agricultural science at the Ludwig-Maximilians-Universität München, the University of Hamburg and the Friedrich Wilhelm University of Berlin, and earned a master's degree in this field in 1927. In 1928, he spent half a year in the Soviet Union as an employee of DRUSAG, which was involved in developing Soviet agriculture in cooperation with the Soviet government. In 1929, he earned a doctorate in agriculture at the University of Berlin with a dissertation titled Die landwirtschaftlichen Grundlagen des Landes Litauen ("The agricultural base of the country of Lithuania"). In 1930, he earned a doctorate in economics at the University of Königsberg with the dissertation Die Landflucht in Deutschland und ihre Bekämpfung durch agrarpolitische Maßnahmen ("The rural exodus in Germany and its prevention by agricultural policy measures"). From 1930 to 1931, he spent nearly two years in the Soviet Union, China, Canada and the United States, where he worked for the Ford Motor Company. In 1931, Oberländer became an assistant professor at the Institute for East German Economy in Königsberg, and in 1933 he became Director of the institute. From 1934, he was also Associate Professor of Agriculture at the Technical College of Danzig. He became Associate Professor at the University of Königsberg in 1937. In 1938, he became Professor of Agriculture at the University of Greifswald.

Oberländer wrote several books about the need for German intervention in the agricultural systems of the Soviet Union and Poland, which he considered "un-economic".

== During the Nazi regime ==
Oberländer became a member of the Nazi Party (membership number 2,331,552) on 1 May 1933. He also joined the Sturmabteilung (SA), the Nazi paramilitary unit, rising to the rank of SA-Obersturmführer on 1 July 1938. He was a member of the leadership of Gau East Prussia where he served until June 1937. On 4 August 1935, he became an assistant to Gauleiter Erich Koch, under whose authority he started to gather information about non-German minorities in East Prussia. A significant role in this process was played by the "Bund Deutscher Osten" (BDO – "League for a German East"), which advocated radical Germanization of the eastern provinces and the elimination of the Polish language in Masuria. The language's traditional usage in the Protestant churches of the Masurians was outlawed in November 1939, with the Lutheran Prussian Church leadership acquiescing in December.

In March 1935, he attended a meeting of professors, scholars and NSDAP training specialists dedicated to the study of the "East" where he focused his essays on what he described as "border struggle" with Poland. The meeting was divided into two groups:”base" and "front". The "base" included 58 professors, lecturers and research assistants, the "front" was made up of political functionaries, seven training specialists of the NSDAP, the Hitler Youth, three heads of Reichsarbeitsdiensts, two teachers and two civil servants. It was Oberländer who introduced the 72 participants on the first day and set for them the task to study the "border struggle" against Poland. Attacking Poland, he advocated fighting the Polish minority in Nazi Germany and demanded that social relationships between Germans and Polish immigrants be prohibited. Oberländer implied that Poland was not capable of sociopolitical and agrarian reforms due to the fact that it was not a "racially homogenous" nation state. He dismissed the population of Polish cities as "transplanted rubes". Sharing Hitler's views, Oberländer believed that the treaties regarding the East, like the German–Polish declaration of non-aggression, were only conditional, and that Ostforschung studies should go on as usual "so that after ten years we have everything ready that we could need in any given circumstances". Continuing his studies on the rural population of Poland he noted in his works that "Poland has eight million inhabitants too many". Reflecting on the temporary lack of possibility of open war in the East, Oberländer wrote the following: "The struggle for ethnicity is nothing other than the continuation of war by other means under the cover of peace. Not a fight with gas, grenades, and machine-guns, but a fight about homes, farms, schools and the souls of children, a struggle whose end, unlike in war, is not foreseeable as long as the insane principle of the nationalism of the state dominates the Eastern region, a struggle which goes on with one aim:extermination!" Other features of Oberländer's thoughts concentrated on depicting Jews as carriers of communism, and the benefits of peasant antisemitism to German goals in Central and Eastern Europe. His preparatory work in the BDO involved monitoring over 1,200,000 Poles living in Germany, with a card-name index of untrustworthy Poles and Germans living in the borderlands, and proposals to Germanise Polish place, street, and family names.

In the middle of 1937, Oberländer formulated a "divide and conquer" strategy for Poland. Within Poland, ethnic groups were to be directed into fighting with each other in order to prepare the ground for German rule. The Poles were to be steered away from opposing Germans and guided into confrontation with Russians and Jews. Oberländer additionally called for elimination of "assimilated Jewry" which in his view carried "communist ideas". Polish peasants were to be "taught" that they benefit from German "law". In order to win over Poles to the side of German hegemony in Europe, Oberländer proposed that they share in the theft of Jewish property. Around 3.5 million Polish Jews and 1.5 million people who were considered "assimilated Jews" were to be deprived of all of their rights. He is considered by some historians to be among the academics who laid the intellectual foundation for the Final Solution.

By 1937, Oberländer, however, started to lose influence in the Nazi Party as his views on the treatment of the Polish population (but not the Jewish question) were losing out to more hardline positions and his personal conflict with Erich Koch. As a result, he had lost his position in East Prussia and within the BDO by 1938. He was essentially fired by the University of Königsberg, after the Nazi government had attacked the "political nature" of his work. He was instead appointed Professor of Agriculture at the University of Greifswald, and was ordered to refrain from involving himself in Ostforschung. From 1937 until the end of Nazi rule he was under surveillance by the Sicherheitsdienst, as he was henceforth suspected of being disloyal to the Nazi cause. From 1 April 1938, he worked as Professor of History at University of Greifswald.

In 1939, Oberländer moved to work in Abwehrstelle Breslau; one of the main centers of sabotage and diversion organised by the Nazis that conducted operations against Poland. At the same time, his work concerned issues connected to Ukraine and the Sudetes region and he had contacts with Osteuropa Institut located in Breslau (Wrocław).

=== World War II ===
In 1940, Oberländer endorsed the ethnic cleansing of the Polish population and, in 1941, wrote in the German magazine Deutsche Monatshefte: "We have the best soldier in the world who re-conquered German soil in the East. There is no bigger responsibility than educating this colonist to be the best on earth and to secure the living space for all time to come" Oberländer's words echoed the views of Heinrich Himmler, who envisioned settling former soldiers, armed with weapons and ploughs in the East, not just pure peasants. During 1940 he moved to the University of Prague, after which he became active in Ukraine, where he was used by Nazi Germany's military as an expert on "ethnic psychology". Biographer Philipp-Christian Wachs describes Oberländer as a "German nationalist and anti-communist, but not a national socialist racial fanatic"; according to Wachs Oberländer was a pragmatist who wanted to secure the cooperation with Poles and Ukrainians, among others, in order to achieve German political dominance and defeat the Soviet Union.

When Germany invaded the Soviet Union in 1941, Oberländer became an advising officer of the Nachtigall Battalion (a Ukrainian Wehrmacht battalion) in occupied Lwów. The participation of the Battalion in The Lwów Civilian Massacre of 1941 has since been subject to controversy, and Oberländer himself was accused after the war of participating in the events.

In January 1942, he sent a report on the situation in Ukraine in which he wrote that success lay in "winning over the masses and pitilessly exterminating partisans as deleterious to the people". He later became the leader of the mixed German and Caucasian Sonderverband Bergmann, which was active in anti-partisan warfare. Both army groups were later claimed to have participated in war crimes. Oberländer's involvement in the Eastern front would lead to the Oberländer case at the end of the 1950s. In 1943, he was dismissed from the Wehrmacht due to political conflict with his superiors and returned to Prague. In 1944, he joined the staff of Andrey Vlasov's Russian Liberation Army. He was a participant to crimes in the Vercors (France), in La Chapelle-en-Vercors and Saint-Nazaire-en-Royans. He was taken prisoner of war by the United States Army in 1945.

== Cold War ==
After the war, Oberländer worked for American intelligence as an expert on Eastern Europe until 1949. In his denazification hearing, he was deemed to be an opponent of Nazism and categorized as "entlastet" (acquitted). After the war, Oberländer claimed that he had criticised Nazi policies and personally only wanted German hegemony over Slavic peoples in which they would have "some respect" and were "treated reasonably humanely".

Oberländer again became active in German politics, first in the liberal Free Democratic Party, then in the Bloc of Refugees and Expellees (GB/BHE)(despite the fact that he himself was not expelled), where he would become a prominent figure alongside another ex-Nazi Waldemar Kraft who had previously been interned for two years for his wartime activities in occupied Poland. The BHE itself was connected in various ways to the Nazis, as it openly tried to win over former NSDAP members angry at denazification, calling their crimes to be only "uncritical belief in Germany's future". The party classified those Nazis on a par with war-damaged as fellow victims. The fact that it selected as its leaders two ex-Nazis, who had taken part in the expulsion of non-Germans and expropriation of their property severely undermined German complaints about their situation. Oberländer joined the Adenauer government of West Germany in 1953 as Minister for Refugees and Expellees. His appointment prompted negative press coverage and made details of his Nazi past known. However, despite the fact that he nominated several former Nazis as co-workers, the criticism soon died down. Adenauer in particular was keen on getting the BHE on board, as, with its support, he controlled a two-thirds majority in parliament. Adenauer knew very well that Oberländer was a former National Socialist and admitted he has a "very brown past"

In 1956, when Oberländer tried to visit his former Nazi co-workers, who were still serving time in Landsberg prison, the foreign minister of Germany vetoed the trip, fearing international consequences, nevertheless, despite hindrances, Oberländer still tried to support far right groups. Oberländer left the GB/BHE for the centrist Christian Democratic Union in 1956 when it broke with Adenauer. Adenauer himself continued to support him, as a matter of principle. In the fall of 1959, the Eastern Bloc unleashed a coordinated campaign against the presence of Nazis in the West German government, which included Oberländer. He was accused of participating in the Lvov Massacre. Previously, he had been able to remain active in politics despite the accusations, but the situation this time became more unfavourable, and some of his fellow CDU colleagues pushed for him to resign for the good of the government and country. While many in West Germany did not believe the accusations of war crimes, it was clear that Oberländer had been an enthusiastic Nazi; due to the fact that the West German community had reinvented its image as a community of innocent bystanders during the Second World War, Oberländer's past was considered a liability.

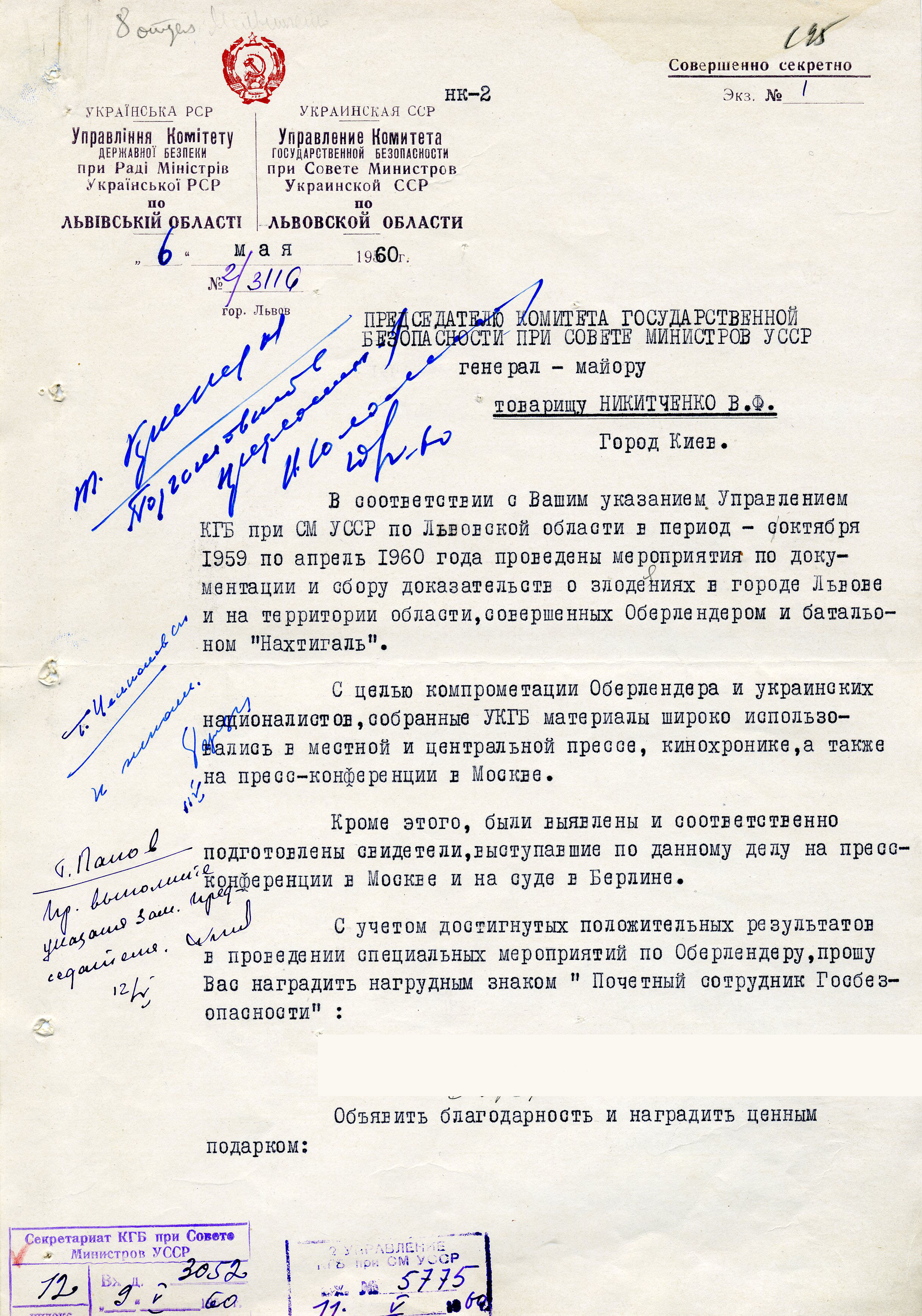
KGB document from the campaign against Oberländer and Ukrainian Nachtigall (1959).

In 1960, Oberländer was sentenced in absentia to life imprisonment by an East German court, for his alleged involvement in the Lviv massacre in 1941. In January 1960, during discussions with 3,000 students of University of Cologne, Adenauer was faced with protests against the continued presence of Oberländer in the German government. In response, Adenauer stated that Oberländer was a Nazi but "never did anything dishonourable". Despite Adenauer's protection, Oberländer became a heavy burden on the German government in May 1960 and finally was forced to resign from the government, but not because of his past but due to the fact that he politically represented no value that was worth the trouble.

Oberländer nevertheless continued efforts to influence the German public, and in 1962 published an article in Der Stahlhelm, an organ of the former Frontsoldaten. In it, he repeated claims about a "revolutionary war" in which he accused the "dictatorship in the East" of conducting an offensive revolution against the West, in which there was "no beginning", and no movement of troops, but which was led by "infiltration and publicism" as well as "espionage". He denounced any possibility of "coexistence" between East and West and blamed such ideas on a "rootless intelligentsia"; Oberländer wrote "to appease the enemy" was "to further world revolution". Historian Michael Burleigh notes that the idea that the "unfree" perhaps didn't wanted to be "liberated" by the likes of Oberländer and his "Bund der Frontsoldaten" (who passed that way twenty years ago)-did not occur to him. In 1986, Oberländer received the Bavarian Order of Merit from the state of Bavaria. The GDR conviction of Oberländer was declared null and void by the Berlin Kammergericht in 1993. At the end of his life, Oberländer became involved in anti-immigration politics.

A preliminary inquiry into Oberländer's role in connection with the unlawful killing of a civilian in Kislovodsk in 1942 during his Bergmann leadership was opened by a district attorney in Cologne in 1996. The allegations involved an interrogation of a female Soviet teacher; it was alleged that she was whipped and, after refusing to talk about suspected partisan activity, shot in the breast by Oberländer, and then left to die. Oberländer called those allegations "old Soviet lies". The inquiry was closed in 1998 due to lack of evidence.

Theodor Oberländer died in Bonn in 1998. He is the father of Professor Erwin Oberländer, a noted expert on Eastern European history, and the grandfather of Christian Oberländer, Professor of Japanese Studies.

== Honours ==
- Grand Cross with Star and Sash of Order of Merit of the Federal Republic of Germany (1955)
- Bavarian Order of Merit (1972)
- Commander of the Legion of Honour

== Publications ==
- Die agrarische Überbevölkerung Polens, Berlin 1935.
- Die agrarische Überbevölkerung Ostmitteleuropas, in: Aubin, Hermann u. a. (Hrsg.): Deutsche Ostforschung. Ergebnisse und Aufgaben seit dem ersten Weltkrieg, Bd. 2 (Deutschland und der Osten. Quellen und Forschungen zur Geschichte ihrer Beziehungen, Bd. 21), Leipzig 1943, S. 416 – 427.
- Der Osten und die deutsche Wehrmacht: sechs Denkschriften aus den Jahren 1941–43 gegen die NS-Kolonialthese. Hrsg. von der Zeitgeschichtlichen Forschungsstelle Ingolstadt. Asendorf, Mut-Verlag. 144 S. In: Zeitgeschichtliche Bibliothek; Bd. 2. ISBN 3-89182-026-7
- Bayern und sein Flüchtlingsproblem, München 1953. – Die Überwindung der deutschen Not, Darmstadt 1954.
- Das Weltflüchtlingsproblem: Ein Vortrag gehalten vor dem Rhein-Ruhr-Club am 8. Mai 1959. Sonderausg. des Arbeits- u. Sozialministers des Landes Nordrhein-Westfalen. Verleger, Bonn: Bundesministerium f. Vertriebene, Flüchtlinge u. Kriegsgeschädigte. 1959.

== Sources ==
- Article about the events in Lviv/Lemberg (in German)
- Fate of the Jews in Mecklenburg-Vorpommern and Oberländer's involvement (in German)
- "Grenzlandpolitik" und Ostforschung an der Peripherie des Reiches. Das ostpreussische Masuren 1919–1945 by Andreas Kossert (in German)
