= Andreas Mattfeldt =

German politician

Andreas Mattfeldt MdB
- Mattfeldt in 2013

Member of the Bundestag; for Osterholz – Verden
- Incumbent
- Assumed office 27 October 2009
- Preceded by: Joachim Stünker

Personal details
- Born: 28 September 1969 (age 57) Verden an der Aller, West Germany
- Party: Christian Democratic Union
- Children: 2

Andreas Mattfeldt (born 28 September 1969) is a German politician of the Christian Democratic Union (CDU) who has been serving as a member of the Bundestag from the state of Lower Saxony since 2009.

== Political career ==
Mattfeldt first became a member of the Bundestag in the 2009 German federal election, representing the Osterholz – Verden district.

In parliament, Mattfeldt is a member of the Committee on Petitions, the Budget Committee and its Subcommittee on European Affairs. On the Budget Committee, he serves as his parliamentary group’s rapporteur on the annual budget of the Federal Ministry for Economic Affairs and Energy and the Federal Ministry of Defence. Since 2024, he has also been a member of the so-called Confidential Committee (Vertrauensgremium) of the Budget Committee, which provides budgetary supervision for Germany's three intelligence services, BND, BfV and MAD.

== Political positions ==
In June 2017, Mattfeldt voted against his parliamentary group’s majority and in favor of Germany's introduction of same-sex marriage.

== Controversy ==
As a member of the Bundestag's Budget Committee in 2020, Mattfeldt campaigned for providing his business partner Georg Friedrich Prinz von Preussen with a €249,000 grant funded by taxpayers.
