= Wolfgang Mischnick =

German politician (1921–2002)

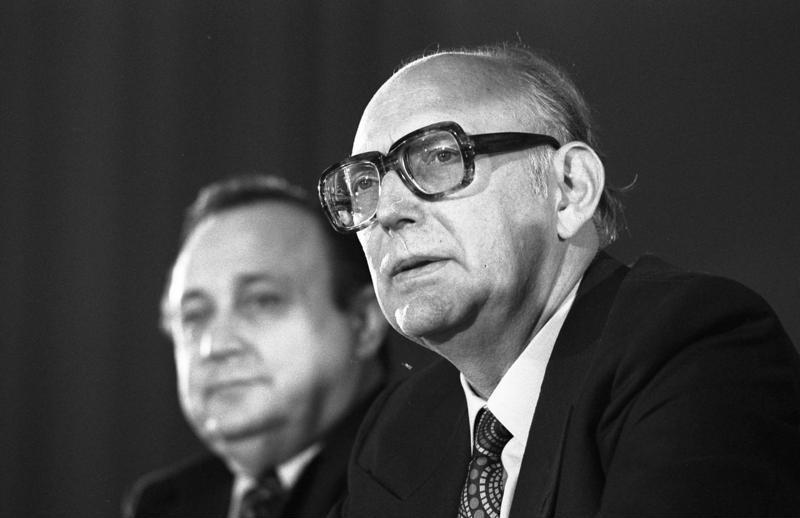
Wolfgang Mischnick 1976 (right) together with Hans-Dietrich Genscher

Wolfgang Mischnick (29 September 1921 – 6 October 2002) was a German liberal politician (FDP). From 1961 to 1963 he was Federal Minister for Expellees, Refugees and War Victims and from 1968 to 1991 Chairman of the FDP parliamentary group and opposition leader from 1968/69.

== Life ==
Mischnick was born 29 September 1921 and grew up in Dresden. After receiving his graduation from high school 1939, he was drafted into the military until the end of the war. As a former lieutenant in the Wehrmacht, the Soviet occupying forces forbade him to study engineering. As co-founder 1945 of the LDP in Dresden Mischnick was banned from writing and speaking very soon. To avoid arrest, he fled 1948 to Frankfurt am Main, where he joined the FDP.

== Political career ==
From 1957 to 1994 Wolfgang Mischnick was a member of the German Bundestag. From 1959 to 1961 he was Parliamentary Managing Director of the FDP parliamentary group.

After the Bundestag election in 1961, Mischnick was appointed Minister for Expellees, Refugees and War Victims in the federal government led by Chancellor Konrad Adenauer as the youngest minister. In 1963 he was deputy chairman and in 1968 chairman of the FDP parliamentary group. As such, he served as opposition leader until the Brandt government took office on 1969. In 1982 he argued for continuing the coalition with the SPD but to preserve party unity, supported the shift of support the (CDU/CSU).

In 1991, Mischnick left the office of parliamentary group chairman at his own request, which he held longer than any other parliamentary group chairman in the history of the Bundestag. After reunion Mischnick played a leading role in merging the FDP and the LDPD in 1989-90. He then entered the Bundestag via the state list of Saxony, though previously he had always become a Bundestag member via the state list of Hesse.

== Positions ==
Mischnick was considered a committed social politician and sports sponsor. His main focus was on German-German relations and reconciliation with the East. 1973 he traveled with Herbert Wehner (SPD) to a meeting with the Chairman of the State Council Erich Honecker in the GDR to improve the relations.

== More information ==
From 1987 to 1995 Mischnick was chairman of the FDP-affiliated Friedrich Naumann Foundation in Gummersbach. There, in the archive of liberalism, can now be found the extensive estate of Mischnick. He died 6 October 2002 in Bad Soden (near his home in Kronberg).

== Awards ==
Mischnick got the Grand Cross of the Order of Merit of the Federal Republic of Germany and was grand officier de la légion d'honneur. He was awarded with the Great Gold Medal of Honor with Star of the Republic of Austria and with the Banner Order of the Hungarian Republic. He got the Order of Merit of the Free State of Saxony, the Hessian Order of Merit and several other medals.

In Dresden a new street was named after him and also in Gröditz, the former street Am Osttor was renamed Wolfgang-Mischnick-Straße.

== Some publications ==
(besides several hundreds of newspaper articles)

- Wolfgang Mischnick: Von Dresden nach Bonn. Erlebnisse - jetzt aufgeschrieben (From Dresden to Bonn. Experiences - now written down), Deutsche Verlags-Anstalt, Stuttgart 1991 ISBN 9783421066121
- Wolfgang Mischnick: Verantwortung für die Freiheit 40 Jahre F.D.P. (Responsibility for freedom 40 years of F.D.P.) Deutsche Verlags-Anstalt, Stuttgart 1989 ISBN 9783421065001
