= Herbert Behrens (politician) =

German trade unionist and politician

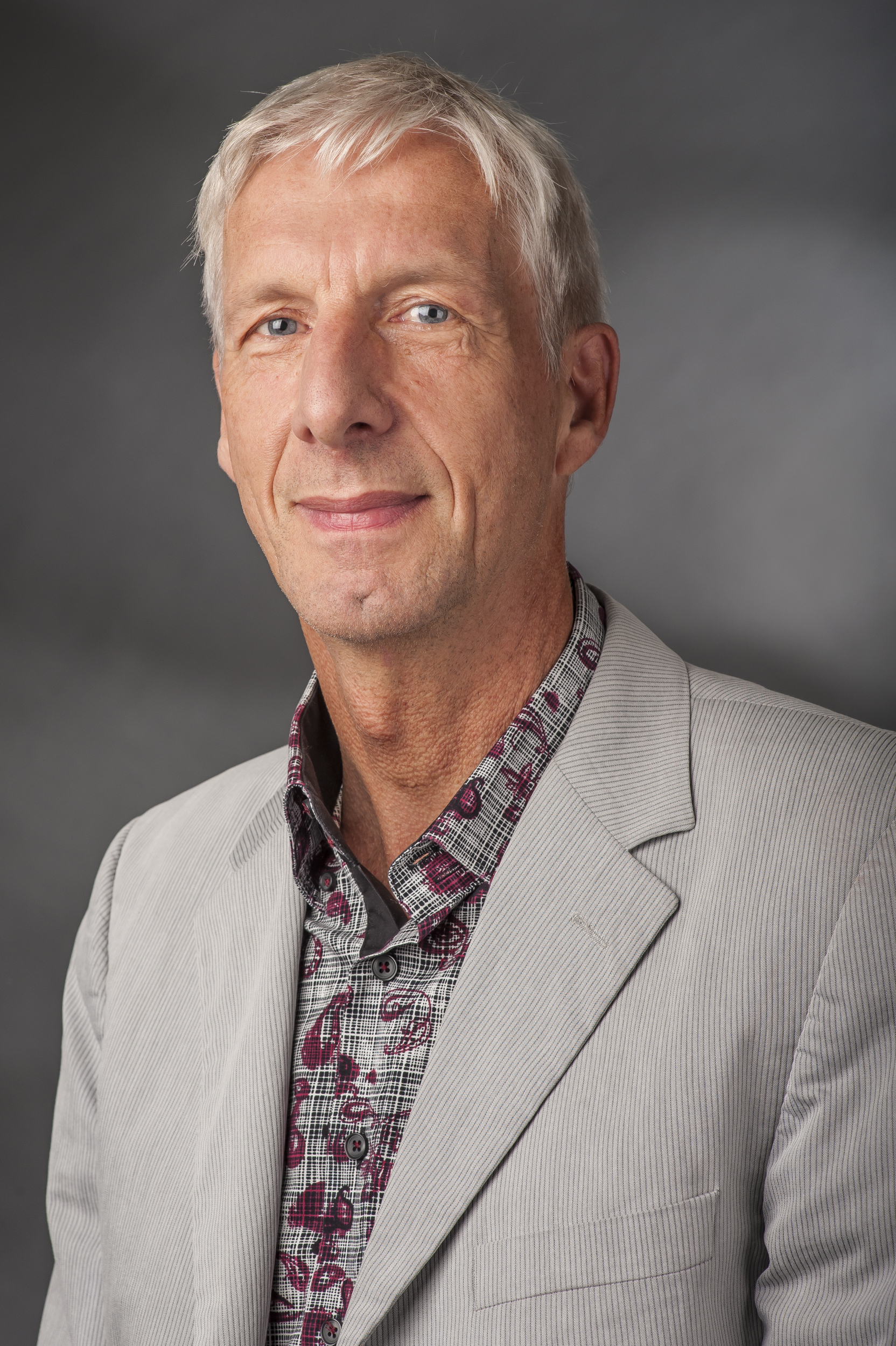
Herbert Behrens, 2014

Herbert Behrens (born 30 May 1954 in Osterholz-Scharmbeck) is a German trade unionist and politician of the party The Left. From 2009 to 2017, he was a member of the German Bundestag.

== Education and early career ==
Herbert Behrens was born as the fourth of five children of a working-class family. After graduating from secondary school in 1970, he began an apprenticeship as typesetter and participated in the citizens' initiative "Garlstedter Heide". He then joined the German Communist Party (DKP), of which he remained a member until 1989. In 1972, he joined the trade union IG Druck und Papier and did volunteer work there. In 1981, he set up a nursery with other parents due to lack of childcare. In 1982, Behrens passed the non-final exam. In the course of his study of social science, he dealt with the digitization of society. In 2002, he finished his studies with his diploma thesis about increased workload through indirect control in modern industry. He then joined ver.di as a trade union secretary for the media, art and industry branches.

== Political career ==
In 2005, when the Wahlalternative Arbeit & Soziale Gerechtigkeit (WASG) was founded, he was one of her co-founders in the district of Osterholz. In the municipal elections in 2006 Behrens was first elected to the city council of his hometown Osterholz-Scharmbeck. In 2011, he moved back into the city council and was chairman of the group of The Left. Since 2008 he is a member of the Lower Saxony state board of the party.

He moved in 2009 as one of six Lower Saxony candidates of his party to the Bundestag. In the 17th legislature, he was a full member of the Committee on Transport, Construction and Urban Development, the New Media Subcommittee, and a deputy member of the Health and Culture and Media Committees. In addition, he worked in the Enquete Commission Internet and digital society. At the election in September 2013 Behrens moved again to the Bundestag via the Lower Saxony The Left party list.

He was chairman of The Left Group in the Committee on Transport and Digital Infrastructure, member of the Digital Agenda Committee and member of the Audit Committee. Behrens was also a member of the Committee for Low German Language and a member of the Baltic Sea Parliamentary Conference.

On 7 February 2015, he was elected to the Lower Saxony State Board of The Left. From February 2015 to March 2017, he was State Chairman of the party.

Behrens was a member for The Left in the committee of inquiry to the Volkswagen emissions scandal. He was elected chairman of the committee at its constituent meeting on 7 July 2016. In the federal elections 2017 Herbert Behrens was a direct candidate in the constituency 34 (Osterholz – Verden).

== Political positions ==
Herbert Behrens has a political focus on transport policy, in which he calls for a "socio-ecological traffic turnaround". Another focus was the digital infrastructure of Germany. Behrens called for an intensification of the expansion of broadband connections. In addition, peace policy is a central topic for Herbert Behrens. He calls for the abolition of NATO and the Bundeswehr, and putting civil conflict resolution at the center of political action.

== Personal life ==
Herbert Behrens is married and has a son.
