= All-German Bloc/League of Expellees and Deprived of Rights =

All-German Bloc/League of Expellees and Deprived of Rights Gesamtdeutscher Block/Bund der Heimatvertriebenen und Entrechteten
- Abbreviation: GB/BHE
- Leader: Waldemar Kraft (1951–1954); Theodor Oberländer (1954–1955)
- Founded: 8 January 1950
- Dissolved: 15 April 1961
- Succeeded by: All-German Party
- Membership (1954): 165,000
- Ideology: National conservatism; Expellee interests; Anti-communism
- Political position: Right-wing

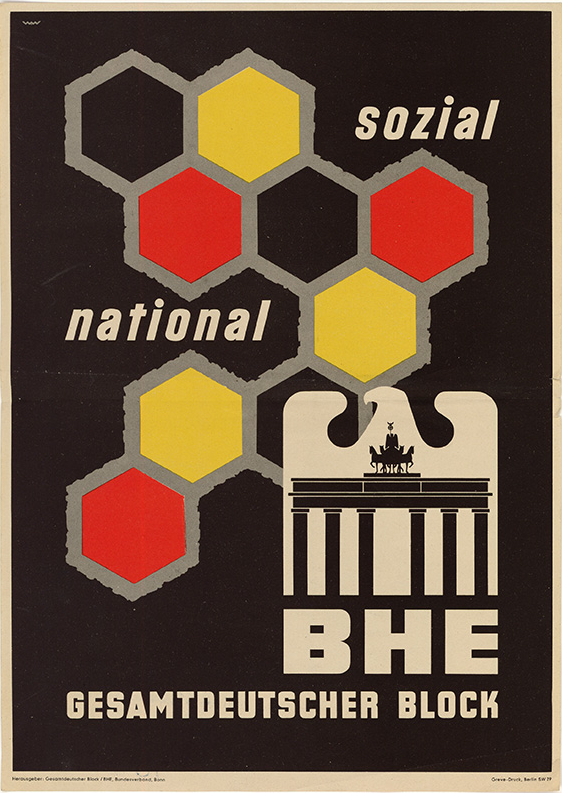
GB-BHE election poster from the 1957 West German federal election

The All-German Bloc/League of Expellees and Deprived of Rights (German: Gesamtdeutscher Block/Bund der Heimatvertriebenen und Entrechteten or GB/BHE) was a right-wing political party in West Germany, which acted as an advocacy group for the Germans who had fled and been expelled from Central and Eastern Europe during and after World War II.

A notable achievement of the GB/BHE was the German Federal Expellee Law.

== History ==
=== Founding ===
Waldemar Kraft, a former SS captain and refugee from what is now Poland, founded the BHE (Block der Heimatvertriebenen und Entrechteten, Bloc of Expellees and of those Deprived of Rights, the latter term serving as a euphemism for ex-Nazis) in Schleswig-Holstein on 30 January 1950, but it did not become active until April, when the British authorities lifted the party licensing requirement.

Theodor Oberländer joined Kraft; he had had involvement in the 1923 Beer Hall Putsch, had joined the Nazi Party and the SA in 1933, had become chairman of the Bund Deutscher Osten organisation, and was a professor at the German Charles University in Prague until 1945.

=== Political activity ===
This new party performed well in the 1950 Schleswig-Holstein elections, becoming the second largest party after taking 23.4% of the vote and 15 seats in the landtag. The BHE formed a coalition government with the Christian Democratic Union, Free Democratic Party, and German Party. Walter Bartram, a CDU member and former Nazi, was made minister president, the first former Nazi to lead a state government in West Germany, while Kraft was made deputy minister president.

In 1950, the BHE received 14.7% and 12.3% in the Baden-Württemberg and Bavarian elections respectively. A convention was held in Bad Godesberg in January 1951 to establish the BHE as a national party. Kraft was appointed as chair and Oberländer as deputy chair. By the end of 1951 the party had seats in three states (Schleswig-Holstein, Bavaria, and Lower Saxony).

In the 1953 federal election, BHE entered the Bundestag parliament with 27 seats. Of the party's 27 deputies, 10 admitted to being members of the Nazi Party, 3 admitted to being in the SS, and 2 admitted to being in the SA. Most of the party's deputies left the section for 1933 to 1945 blank in their Bundestag biographies.

The party became coalition partner in Adenauer's second cabinet, with Oberländer and Kraft as Minister for Displaced Persons and Minister for Special Affairs respectively. However, with their ongoing integration in the West German society of the Wirtschaftswunder era, more and more expellees saw no need for a parliamentary representation beside the BdV pressure group, and the role of the party dwindled away. In addition, the GB/BHE ministers were reproached by their party fellows for supporting Adenauer's policies to integrate the Federal Republic into the West. After an open conflict over the future status of the Saarland as an independent entity of the Western European Union, Chairman Kraft resigned from his post in 1954, when at a party convention his aide Eva Gräfin Finck von Finckenstein had not been re-elected as member of the executive committee.

In June 1955, Kraft and Oberländer were accused by BHE members of not getting enough concessions from Adenauer in return for supporting his foreign policy. Kraft, Oberländer, and 6 other BHE deputies broke away from the party in response and Kraft and Oberländer offered to resign from Adenauer's cabinet.

Adenauer took advantage of the split in the BHE. He offered to allow any BHE member to remain in his cabinet if they joined the CDU. Kraft was removed from the cabinet, but Oberländer remained until 1960. The BHE failed to receive enough support in the 1957 federal election to win any seats. Until the end, it had somewhat more success in state elections, still represented in the state diets (Landtage) of Baden-Württemberg, Bavaria, Hesse, Lower Saxony and Schleswig-Holstein, and participating in the states' governments. Several of its prominent members eventually became members of the CDU or CSU after 1955.

Former Nazi officials (Walter Eckhardt), propaganda writers (Walter Becher), SA and SS officers (Wilhelm Schepmann) and war criminals (Heinz Reinefarth, Hans Krueger) were activists of the party. Former BDM-leader Trude Bürkner-Mohr stood as a GB/BHE candidate in the 1953 state and federal elections. Oberländer endorsed the ethnic cleansing of the Polish population during the war.

=== Demise ===
In 1961, the party merged with the remnants of the German Party (Deutsche Partei, DP) to form the All-German Party (Gesamtdeutsche Partei, GDP), which however in turn failed to enter the Bundestag, winning only 2.8% of the votes in the 1961 election.

== Works cited ==
- Long, Wellington (1968). The New Nazis of Germany. Chilton Company.
