= Christina Jantz-Herrmann =

German politician (born 1978)

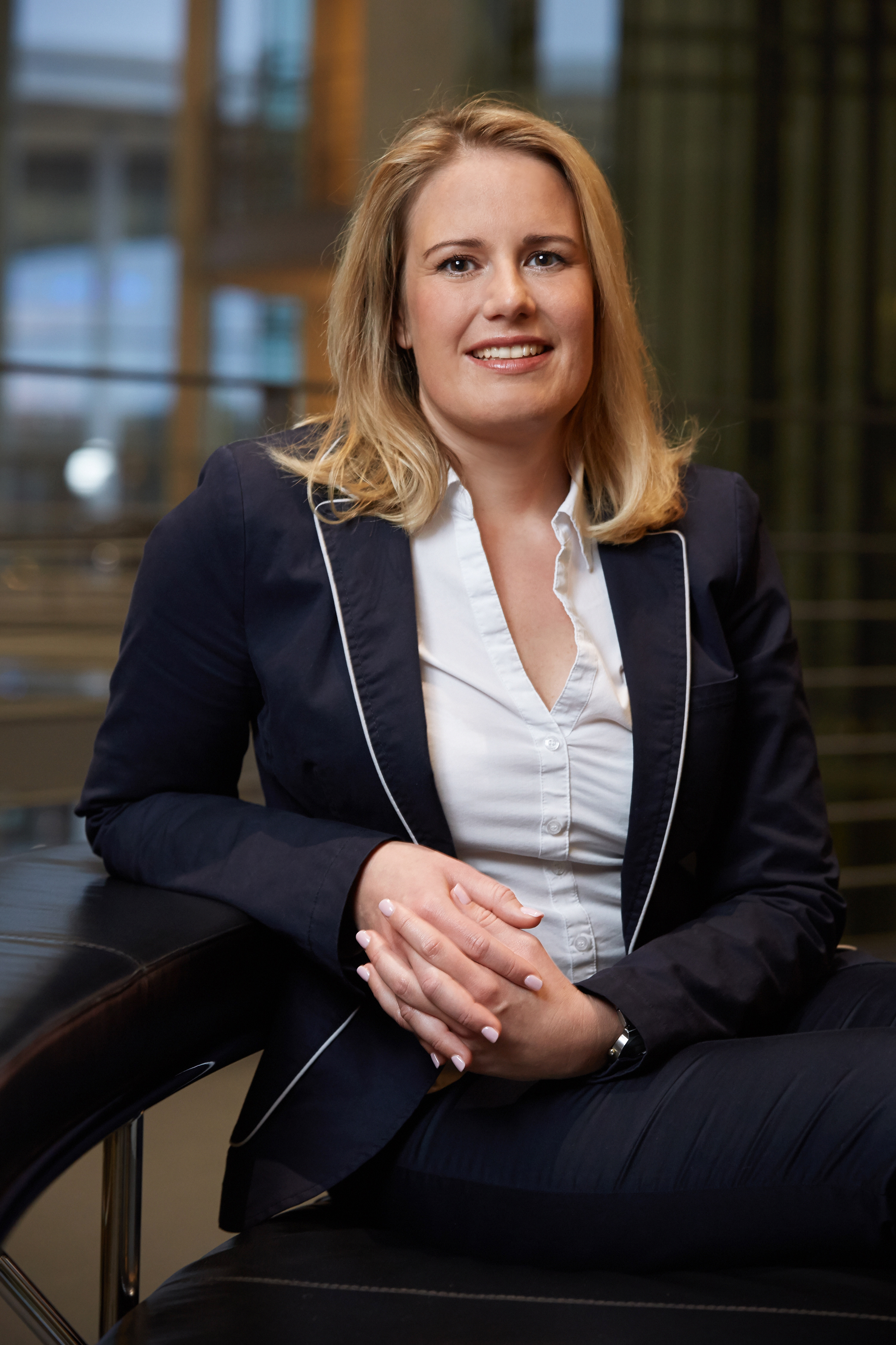
- Jantz-Herrmann in 2014

Member of the Bundestag
- In office 22 October 2013 – 24 October 2017
- Constituency: Lower Saxony

Personal details
- Born: 6 September 1978 (age 47) Bremen
- Party: Social Democratic Party (since 2005)

Christina Jantz-Herrmann (née Jantz; born 6 September 1978 in Bremen) is a German politician serving as mayor of Schwanewede since 2021. From 2013 to 2017, she was a member of the Bundestag.
