= Langwedel =

- Municipality
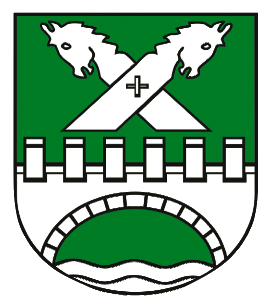
- Coat of arms

- Location of Langwedel within Verden district
- Interactive map of Langwedel
- Location within Germany Location within Lower Saxony
- Coordinates: 52°58′N 9°13′E
- Country: Germany
- State: Lower Saxony
- District: Verden
- Subdivisions: 6 districts

Government
  - Mayor (2017–25): Andreas Brandt (SPD)

Area
  - Total: 76.24 km^{2} (29.44 sq mi)
- Elevation: 19 m (62 ft)

Population (2025-12-31)
  - Total: 14,689
  - Density: 192.7/km^{2} (499.0/sq mi)
- Time zone: UTC+01:00 (CET)
  - Summer (DST): UTC+02:00 (CEST)
- Postal codes: 27299
- Dialling codes: 04232, 04235
- Vehicle registration: VER
- Website: www.langwedel.de

Langwedel (German pronunciation: [ˈlaŋveːdl̩]) is a municipality in the district of Verden, in Lower Saxony, Germany. It is situated on the right bank of the Weser, approximately 7 km northwest of Verden, and 30 km southeast of Bremen.

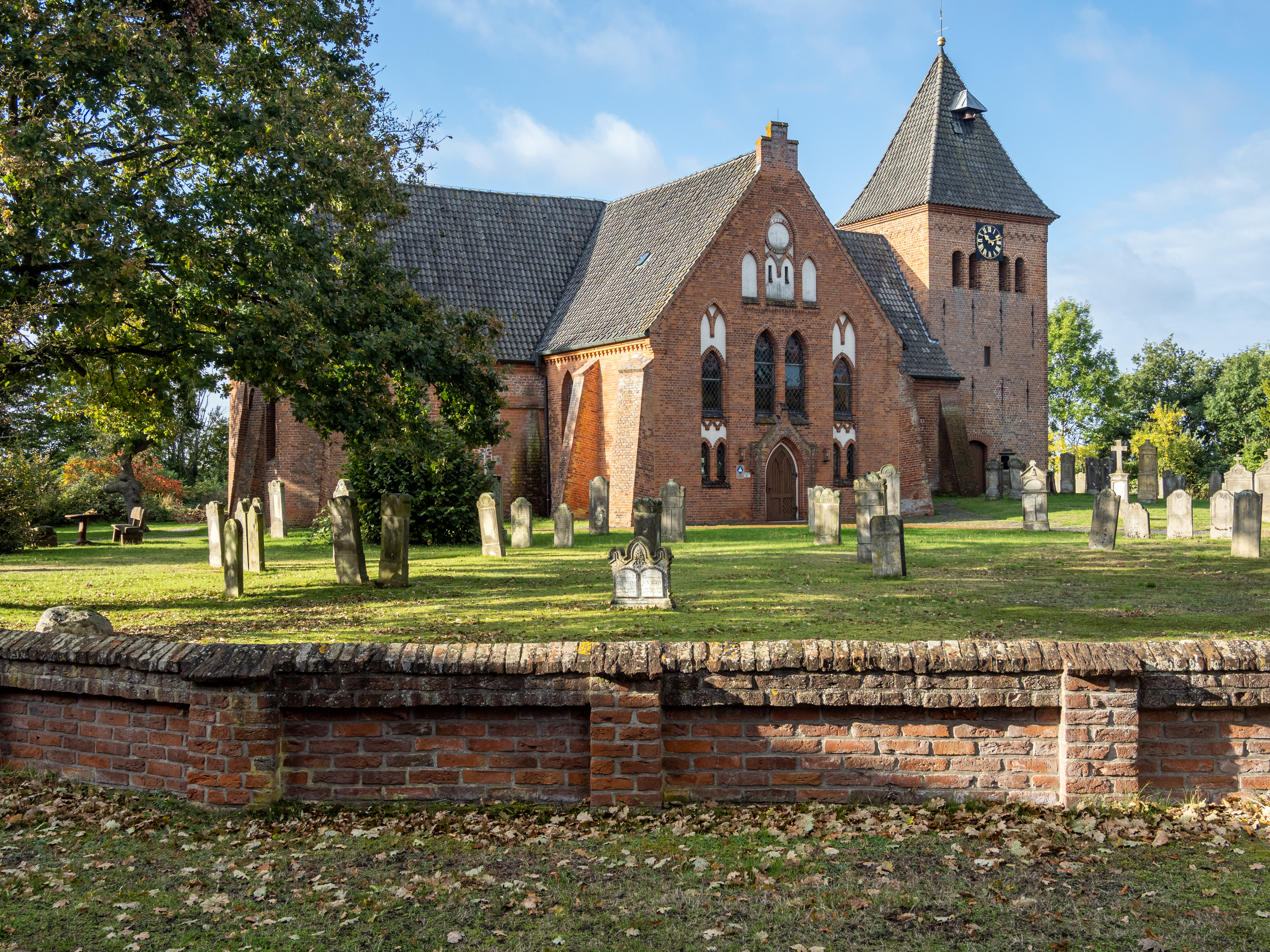
Church of St. Sigismund in Daverden

Langwedel belonged to the Prince-Bishopric of Verden, established in 1180. In 1648 the Prince-Bishopric was transformed into the Principality of Verden, which was first ruled in personal union by the Swedish Crown - interrupted by a Danish occupation (1712–1715) - and from 1715 on by the Hanoverian Crown. The Kingdom of Hanover incorporated the Principality in a real union and the Princely territory, including Langwedel, became part of the new Stade Region, established in 1823.

== Organization ==
Langwedel is a unit municipality and consists of the following villages:

- Daverden (13,005 km^{2}).
- Etelsen (with Cluvenhagen and Hagen-Grinden as well as Giersberg and Steinberg) (23,874 km^{2}).
- Haberloh (5,404 km^{2}).
- Holtebüttel (with Dahlbrügge, Nindorf, Schülingen and Overing and Förth) (8,492 km^{2}).
- Langwedel (with Langwedelermoor) (7,619 km^{2}).
- Völkersen (17,716 km^{2}).
