= List of members of the 11th Bundestag =

This is a list of members of the 11th Bundestag – the lower house of parliament of the Federal Republic of Germany, whose members were in office from 1987 until 1990. German reunification took place during this Bundestag.

== Summary ==
This summary includes changes in the numbers of the five caucuses (CDU/CSU, SPD, Greens, FDP, Party of Democratic Socialism):

Time	Reason for change	CDU/CSU	SPD	FDP	Greens	PDS	Others	Total number
1987	First meeting	223	186	46	42	-		497
26 January 1988	Thomas Wüppesahl leaves the Greens caucus and becomes unaffiliated	223	186	46	41	-	1	497
13 September 1989	Trude Unruh leaves the Greens caucus and becomes unaffiliated	223	186	46	40	-	2	497
8 June 1990	The 22 West Berlin representatives, who were non-voting observers until then, become full members of the Bundestag	234	193	48	42	-	2	519
1 October 1990	Ulrich Briefs leaves the Greens caucus and becomes unaffiliated	234	193	48	41	-	3	519
3 October 1990	144 Volkskammer deputies join the Bundestag, leading to the creation of a new PDS caucus and the expansion of other caucuses	305	226	57	48	24	3	663

Starting with the first West German election in 1949, West Berlin sent a number of deputies (de) to the Bundestag. Under the terms of the Four Power Agreement on Berlin, West Berlin could not participate in West German federal elections, so instead the city's state parliament chose 22 non-voting "Berlin deputies" on the same date as elections were held in the rest of West Germany. These deputies were non-voting for most of West Berlin's history, but on 8 June 1990 they were given full voting right, increasing the voting membership of the Bundestag from 497 to 519. The 22 members elected in 1987 were broken down by party as follows: 11 from the CDU, 7 from the SPD, 2 from the FDP, and 2 from the Alliance 90/Green Party.

German reunification took place during this Bundestag. When East Germany was dissolved on 3 October 1990, 144 members of the Volkskammer were transferred to the Bundestag, who would sit until the next election along with the West German members elected in 1987. This increased the size of the Bundestag to 663. The 144 members were broken down by party as follows: 63 from the CDU, 33 from the SPD, 24 from the PDS, 9 from the FDP (formerly BFD), 8 from the DSU, and 7 from Alliance 90/Green Party. See 1990 East German general election#Aftermath for details.

== Members ==
State	No.	Constituency	Member	Party
Schleswig-Holstein	1	Flensburg – Schleswig	Wolfgang Börnsen	CDU
Schleswig-Holstein	2	Nordfriesland – Dithmarschen-Nord	Peter Harry Carstensen	CDU
Schleswig-Holstein	3	Steinburg – Dithmarschen-Süd	Dietrich Austermann	CDU
Schleswig-Holstein	4	Rendsburg-Eckernförde	Gerhard Stoltenberg	CDU
Schleswig-Holstein	5	Kiel	Norbert Gansel	SPD
Schleswig-Holstein	6	Plön – Neumünster	Horst Jungmann	SPD
Schleswig-Holstein	7	Pinneberg	Ingrid Roitzsch	CDU
Schleswig-Holstein	8	Segeberg – Stormarn-Nord	Peter Kurt Würzbach	CDU
Schleswig-Holstein	9	Ostholstein	Rolf Olderog	CDU
Schleswig-Holstein	10	Herzogtum Lauenburg – Stormarn-Süd	Michael von Schmude	CDU
Schleswig-Holstein	11	Lübeck	Reinhold Hiller	SPD
Schleswig-Holstein	List		Egon Bahr	SPD
Schleswig-Holstein	List		Lieselott Blunck	SPD
Schleswig-Holstein	List		Günther Heyenn	SPD
Schleswig-Holstein	List		Günther Jansen (Note: Günther Jansen resigned on 16 June 1988.)	SPD
Schleswig-Holstein	List		Eckart Kuhlwein	SPD
Schleswig-Holstein	List		Heide Simonis (Note: Heide Simonis resigned on 8 June 1988.)	SPD
Schleswig-Holstein	List		Cornelie Sonntag-Wolgast (Note: Cornelie Sonntag-Wolgast took office on 14 June 1988, to succeed Heide Simonis.)	SPD
Schleswig-Holstein	List		Manfred Opel (Note: Manfred Opel took office on 20 June 1988, to succeed Günther Jansen.)	SPD
Schleswig-Holstein	List		Uwe Ronneburger	FDP
Schleswig-Holstein	List		Werner Zywietz	FDP
Schleswig-Holstein	List		Angelika Beer	Greens
Schleswig-Holstein	List		Thomas Wüppesahl	Greens
Schleswig-Holstein	List		Karl Eigen	CDU
Hamburg	12	Hamburg-Mitte	Freimut Duve	SPD
Hamburg	13	Hamburg-Altona	Jürgen Echternach	CDU
Hamburg	14	Hamburg-Eimsbüttel	Peter Paterna	SPD
Hamburg	15	Hamburg-Nord	Dirk Fischer	CDU
Hamburg	16	Hamburg-Wandsbek	Peter Zumkley	SPD
Hamburg	17	Hamburg-Bergedorf	Rolf Niese	SPD
Hamburg	18	Hamburg-Harburg	Hans-Ulrich Klose	SPD
Hamburg	List		Klaus Francke	CDU
Hamburg	List		Volker Rühe	CDU
Hamburg	List		Gunnar Uldall	CDU
Hamburg	List		Thomas Ebermann (Note: Thomas Ebermann resigned on 18 February 1989.)	Greens
Hamburg	List		Regula Schmidt-Bott (Note: Regula Schmidt-Bott resigned on 18 February 1989.)	Greens
Hamburg	List		Tay Eich (Note: Tay Eich took office on 20 February 1989, to succeed Thomas Ebermann.)	Greens
Hamburg	List		Marie-Luise Schmidt (Note: Marie-Luise Schmidt took office on 20 February 1989, to succeed Regula Schmidt-Bott.)	Greens
Hamburg	List		Hans Apel	SPD
Hamburg	List		Rainer Funke	FDP
Lower Saxony	19	Aurich – Emden	Carl Ewen	SPD
Lower Saxony	20	Unterems	Rudolf Seiters	CDU
Lower Saxony	21	Friesland – Wilhelmshaven	Herbert Ehrenberg	SPD
Lower Saxony	22	Oldenburg – Ammerland	Dietmar Schütz	SPD
Lower Saxony	23	Delmenhorst – Wesermarsch – Oldenburg-Land	Margitta Terborg	SPD
Lower Saxony	24	Cuxhaven	Wolfgang von Geldern	CDU
Lower Saxony	25	Stade – Rotenburg I	Horst Eylmann	CDU
Lower Saxony	26	Mittelems	Hans-Gerd Strube	CDU
Lower Saxony	27	Cloppenburg – Vechta	Manfred Carstens	CDU
Lower Saxony	28	Diepholz	Walter Link	CDU
Lower Saxony	29	Verden – Osterholz	Arne Börnsen	SPD
Lower Saxony	30	Soltau-Fallingbostel – Rotenburg II	Ingeborg Hoffmann	CDU
Lower Saxony	31	Lüneburg – Lüchow-Dannenberg	Klaus Harries	CDU
Lower Saxony	32	Osnabrück-Land	Reinhard von Schorlemer	CDU
Lower Saxony	33	Stadt Osnabrück	Karl-Heinz Hornhues	CDU
Lower Saxony	34	Nienburg – Schaumburg	Ernst Kastning	SPD
Lower Saxony	35	Harburg	Herbert Helmrich	CDU
Lower Saxony	36	Stadt Hannover I	Gerd Andres	SPD
Lower Saxony	37	Stadt Hannover II	Edelgard Bulmahn	SPD
Lower Saxony	38	Hannover-Land I	Dietmar Kansy	CDU
Lower Saxony	39	Celle – Uelzen	Klaus-Jürgen Hedrich	CDU
Lower Saxony	40	Gifhorn – Peine	Engelbert Nelle	CDU
Lower Saxony	41	Hameln – Holzminden	Brigitte Traupe	SPD
Lower Saxony	42	Hannover-Land II	Günter Kiehm	SPD
Lower Saxony	43	Hildesheim	Hermann Rappe	SPD
Lower Saxony	44	Salzgitter – Wolfenbüttel	Wilhelm Schmidt	SPD
Lower Saxony	45	Braunschweig	Joachim Clemens	CDU
Lower Saxony	46	Helmstedt – Wolfsburg	Volkmar Köhler	CDU
Lower Saxony	47	Goslar	Rudolf Sprung	CDU
Lower Saxony	48	Northeim – Osterode	Edith Niehuis	SPD
Lower Saxony	49	Göttingen	Rita Süssmuth	CDU
Lower Saxony	List		Karl Ahrens	SPD
Lower Saxony	List		Alfred Emmerlich	SPD
Lower Saxony	List		Annette Faße	SPD
Lower Saxony	List		Monika Ganseforth	SPD
Lower Saxony	List		Fritz Gautier	SPD
Lower Saxony	List		Günter Graf	SPD
Lower Saxony	List		Ingomar Hauchler	SPD
Lower Saxony	List		Klaus-Dieter Kühbacher	SPD
Lower Saxony	List		Jan Oostergetelo	SPD
Lower Saxony	List		Bodo Seidenthal	SPD
Lower Saxony	List		Peter Struck	SPD
Lower Saxony	List		Günther Tietjen	SPD
Lower Saxony	List		Peter Würtz	SPD
Lower Saxony	List		Wilfried Bohlsen	CDU
Lower Saxony	List		Gertrud Dempwolf	CDU
Lower Saxony	List		Thomas Kossendey	CDU
Lower Saxony	List		Herbert Lattmann	CDU
Lower Saxony	List		Erich Maaß	CDU
Lower Saxony	List		Helmut Sauer	CDU
Lower Saxony	List		Hans-Peter Voigt	CDU
Lower Saxony	List		Ludolf von Wartenberg	CDU
Lower Saxony	List		Günther Bredehorn	FDP
Lower Saxony	List		Sigrid Folz-Steinacker	FDP
Lower Saxony	List		Detlef Kleinert	FDP
Lower Saxony	List		Friedrich Neuhausen	FDP
Lower Saxony	List		Jürgen Timm	FDP
Lower Saxony	List		Torsten Wolfgramm	FDP
Lower Saxony	List		Hans-Jochim Brauer	Greens
Lower Saxony	List		Charlotte Garbe	Greens
Lower Saxony	List		Helmut Lippelt	Greens
Lower Saxony	List		Waltraud Schoppe (Note: Waltraud Schoppe resigned on 21 June 1990.)	Greens
Lower Saxony	List		Lieselotte Wollny	Greens
Lower Saxony	List		Norbert Roske (Note: Norbert Roske took office on 22 June 1990, to succeed Waltraud Schoppe.)	Greens
Bremen	50	Bremen-Ost	Ernst Waltemathe	SPD
Bremen	51	Bremen-West	Hans Koschnick	SPD
Bremen	52	Bremerhaven – Bremen-Nord	Horst Grunenberg	SPD
Bremen	List		Wolfgang Hinrichs	CDU
Bremen	List		Bernd Neumann	CDU
Bremen	List		Marieluise Beck-Oberdorf	Greens
Bremen	List		Manfred Richter	FDP
North Rhine-Westphalia	53	Aachen	Hans Stercken	CDU
North Rhine-Westphalia	54	Kreis Aachen	Achim Großmann	SPD
North Rhine-Westphalia	55	Heinsberg	Karl H. Fell	CDU
North Rhine-Westphalia	56	Düren	Wolfgang Vogt	CDU
North Rhine-Westphalia	57	Erftkreis I	Klaus Lennartz	SPD
North Rhine-Westphalia	58	Euskirchen – Erftkreis II	Wolf Bauer	CDU
North Rhine-Westphalia	59	Cologne I	Hans-Jürgen Wischnewski	SPD
North Rhine-Westphalia	60	Cologne II	Heribert Blens	CDU
North Rhine-Westphalia	61	Cologne III	Konrad Gilges	SPD
North Rhine-Westphalia	62	Cologne IV	Günter Oesinghaus	SPD
North Rhine-Westphalia	63	Bonn	Hans Daniels	CDU
North Rhine-Westphalia	64	Rhein-Sieg-Kreis I	Adolf Herkenrath	CDU
North Rhine-Westphalia	65	Rhein-Sieg-Kreis II	Franz Möller	CDU
North Rhine-Westphalia	66	Oberbergischer Kreis	Horst Waffenschmidt	CDU
North Rhine-Westphalia	67	Rheinisch-Bergischer Kreis I	Franz Heinrich Krey	CDU
North Rhine-Westphalia	68	Leverkusen – Rheinisch-Bergischer Kreis II	Johannes Singer	SPD
North Rhine-Westphalia	69	Wuppertal I	Rudolf Dreßler	SPD
North Rhine-Westphalia	70	Wuppertal II	Willfried Penner	SPD
North Rhine-Westphalia	71	Solingen – Remscheid	Bernd Wilz	CDU
North Rhine-Westphalia	72	Mettmann I	Joseph-Theodor Blank	CDU
North Rhine-Westphalia	73	Mettmann II	Heinz Schemken	CDU
North Rhine-Westphalia	74	Düsseldorf I	Wolfgang Schulhoff	CDU
North Rhine-Westphalia	75	Düsseldorf II	Volker Jung	SPD
North Rhine-Westphalia	76	Neuss I	Heinz Günther Hüsch	CDU
North Rhine-Westphalia	77	Neuss II	Willy Wimmer	CDU
North Rhine-Westphalia	78	Mönchengladbach	Hans-Wilhelm Pesch	CDU
North Rhine-Westphalia	79	Krefeld	Hansheinz Hauser	CDU
North Rhine-Westphalia	80	Viersen	Julius Louven	CDU
North Rhine-Westphalia	81	Kleve	Heinrich Seesing	CDU
North Rhine-Westphalia	82	Wesel I	Uwe Jens	SPD
North Rhine-Westphalia	83	Wesel II	Jürgen Schmude	SPD
North Rhine-Westphalia	84	Duisburg I	Helmut Wieczorek	SPD
North Rhine-Westphalia	85	Duisburg II	Günter Schluckebier	SPD
North Rhine-Westphalia	86	Oberhausen	Dieter Schanz	SPD
North Rhine-Westphalia	87	Mülheim	Thomas Schröer	SPD
North Rhine-Westphalia	88	Essen I	Otto Reschke	SPD
North Rhine-Westphalia	89	Essen II	Peter Reuschenbach	SPD
North Rhine-Westphalia	90	Essen III	Ingrid Becker-Inglau	SPD
North Rhine-Westphalia	91	Recklinghausen I	Heinz-Werner Meyer	SPD
North Rhine-Westphalia	92	Recklinghausen II	Horst Niggemeier	SPD
North Rhine-Westphalia	93	Gelsenkirchen I	Joachim Poß	SPD
North Rhine-Westphalia	94	Gelsenkirchen II – Recklinghausen III	Heinz Menzel	SPD
North Rhine-Westphalia	95	Bottrop – Recklinghausen IV	Franz-Josef Mertens	SPD
North Rhine-Westphalia	96	Borken	Hermann Josef Unland	CDU
North Rhine-Westphalia	97	Coesfeld – Steinfurt I	Wilhelm Rawe	CDU
North Rhine-Westphalia	98	Steinfurt II	Constantin Heereman von Zuydtwyck	CDU
North Rhine-Westphalia	99	Münster	Friedrich-Adolf Jahn	CDU
North Rhine-Westphalia	100	Warendorf	Heinrich Windelen	CDU
North Rhine-Westphalia	101	Gütersloh	Ottfried Hennig	CDU
North Rhine-Westphalia	102	Bielefeld	Günter Rixe	SPD
North Rhine-Westphalia	103	Herford	Rolf Koltzsch	SPD
North Rhine-Westphalia	104	Minden-Lübbecke	Lothar Ibrügger	SPD
North Rhine-Westphalia	105	Lippe I	Karl Hermann Haack	SPD
North Rhine-Westphalia	106	Höxter – Lippe II	Meinolf Michels	CDU
North Rhine-Westphalia	107	Paderborn	Heinrich Pohlmeier	CDU
North Rhine-Westphalia	108	Hagen	Hans-Günther Toetemeyer	SPD
North Rhine-Westphalia	109	Ennepe-Ruhr-Kreis I	Eugen von der Wiesche	SPD
North Rhine-Westphalia	110	Bochum I	Klaus Hasenfratz	SPD
North Rhine-Westphalia	111	Bochum II – Ennepe-Ruhr-Kreis II	Klaus Lohmann	SPD
North Rhine-Westphalia	112	Herne	Heinz Westphal	SPD
North Rhine-Westphalia	113	Dortmund I	Hans-Eberhard Urbaniak	SPD
North Rhine-Westphalia	114	Dortmund II	Wolfgang Weiermann	SPD
North Rhine-Westphalia	115	Dortmund III	Werner Zeitler	SPD
North Rhine-Westphalia	116	Unna I	Ulrich Böhme	SPD
North Rhine-Westphalia	117	Hamm – Unna II	Dieter Wiefelspütz	SPD
North Rhine-Westphalia	118	Soest	Hermann Kroll-Schlüter	CDU
North Rhine-Westphalia	119	Hochsauerlandkreis	Ferdinand Tillmann	CDU
North Rhine-Westphalia	120	Siegen-Wittgenstein I	Paul Breuer	CDU
North Rhine-Westphalia	121	Olpe – Siegen-Wittgenstein II	Joachim Grünewald	CDU
North Rhine-Westphalia	122	Märkischer Kreis I	Otto Wulff	CDU
North Rhine-Westphalia	123	Märkischer Kreis II	Lisa Seuster	SPD
North Rhine-Westphalia	List		Kurt Biedenkopf (Note: Kurt Biedenkopf resigned on 9 November 1990.)	CDU
North Rhine-Westphalia	List		Norbert Blüm	CDU
North Rhine-Westphalia	List		Jochen Borchert	CDU
North Rhine-Westphalia	List		Klaus Daweke	CDU
North Rhine-Westphalia	List		Leni Fischer	CDU
North Rhine-Westphalia	List		Ludwig Gerstein	CDU
North Rhine-Westphalia	List		Reinhard Göhner	CDU
North Rhine-Westphalia	List		Horst Günther	CDU
North Rhine-Westphalia	List		Paul Hoffacker	CDU
North Rhine-Westphalia	List		Agnes Hürland-Büning	CDU
North Rhine-Westphalia	List		Irmgard Karwatzki	CDU
North Rhine-Westphalia	List		Friedrich Kronenberg	CDU
North Rhine-Westphalia	List		Karl Lamers	CDU
North Rhine-Westphalia	List		Norbert Lammert	CDU
North Rhine-Westphalia	List		Editha Limbach	CDU
North Rhine-Westphalia	List		Erwin Marschewski	CDU
North Rhine-Westphalia	List		Reinhard Meyer zu Bentrup	CDU
North Rhine-Westphalia	List		Alfons Müller	CDU
North Rhine-Westphalia	List		Winfried Pinger	CDU
North Rhine-Westphalia	List		Gerhard Reddemann	CDU
North Rhine-Westphalia	List		Jürgen Rüttgers	CDU
North Rhine-Westphalia	List		Hans Peter Schmitz	CDU
North Rhine-Westphalia	List		Friedrich Vogel	CDU
North Rhine-Westphalia	List		Ruprecht Vondran	CDU
North Rhine-Westphalia	List		Dorothee Wilms	CDU
North Rhine-Westphalia	List		Wolfgang Lohmann (Note: Wolfgang Lohmann took office on 12 November 1990, to succeed Kurt Biedenkopf.)	CDU
North Rhine-Westphalia	List		Helmuth Becker	SPD
North Rhine-Westphalia	List		Hans Gottfried Bernrath	SPD
North Rhine-Westphalia	List		Willy Brandt	SPD
North Rhine-Westphalia	List		Hermann Buschfort	SPD
North Rhine-Westphalia	List		Wolf-Michael Catenhusen	SPD
North Rhine-Westphalia	List		Horst Ehmke	SPD
North Rhine-Westphalia	List		Helmut Esters	SPD
North Rhine-Westphalia	List		Anke Fuchs	SPD
North Rhine-Westphalia	List		Katrin Fuchs	SPD
North Rhine-Westphalia	List		Dieter Heistermann	SPD
North Rhine-Westphalia	List		Uwe Holtz	SPD
North Rhine-Westphalia	List		Horst Jaunich	SPD
North Rhine-Westphalia	List		Karl-Heinz Klejdzinski	SPD
North Rhine-Westphalia	List		Volkmar Kretkowski	SPD
North Rhine-Westphalia	List		Ingrid Matthäus-Maier	SPD
North Rhine-Westphalia	List		Michael Müller	SPD
North Rhine-Westphalia	List		Franz Müntefering	SPD
North Rhine-Westphalia	List		Wilhelm Nöbel	SPD
North Rhine-Westphalia	List		Rudolf Purps	SPD
North Rhine-Westphalia	List		Annemarie Renger	SPD
North Rhine-Westphalia	List		Erwin Stahl	SPD
North Rhine-Westphalia	List		Heinz-Alfred Steiner	SPD
North Rhine-Westphalia	List		Waltraud Steinhauer	SPD
North Rhine-Westphalia	List		Josef Vosen	SPD
North Rhine-Westphalia	List		Gerhart Baum	FDP
North Rhine-Westphalia	List		Klaus Beckmann	FDP
North Rhine-Westphalia	List		Dieter-Julius Cronenberg	FDP
North Rhine-Westphalia	List		Hans H. Gattermann	FDP
North Rhine-Westphalia	List		Hans-Dietrich Genscher	FDP
North Rhine-Westphalia	List		Burkhard Hirsch	FDP
North Rhine-Westphalia	List		Werner Hoyer	FDP
North Rhine-Westphalia	List		Karl-Hans Laermann	FDP
North Rhine-Westphalia	List		Otto Graf Lambsdorff	FDP
North Rhine-Westphalia	List		Jürgen Möllemann	FDP
North Rhine-Westphalia	List		Günther Friedrich Nolting	FDP
North Rhine-Westphalia	List		Irmgard Schwaetzer	FDP
North Rhine-Westphalia	List		Helga Brahmst-Rock	Greens
North Rhine-Westphalia	List		Ulrich Briefs	Greens
North Rhine-Westphalia	List		Imma Hillerich	Greens
North Rhine-Westphalia	List		Wilhelm Knabe	Greens
North Rhine-Westphalia	List		Verena Krieger (Note: Verena Krieger resigned on 4 April 1989.)	Greens
North Rhine-Westphalia	List		Christa Nickels	Greens
North Rhine-Westphalia	List		Otto Schily (Note: Otto Schily resigned on 7 November 1989.)	Greens
North Rhine-Westphalia	List		Eckhard Stratmann-Mertens	Greens
North Rhine-Westphalia	List		Trude Unruh	Greens
North Rhine-Westphalia	List		Antje Vollmer	Greens
North Rhine-Westphalia	List		Ludger Volmer	Greens
North Rhine-Westphalia	List		Manfred Such (Note: Manfred Such took office on 4 April 1989, to succeed Verena Krieger.)	Greens
North Rhine-Westphalia	List		Almut Kottwitz (Note: Almut Kottwitz took office on 8 November 1989, to succeed Otto Schily.)	Greens
Hesse	124	Waldeck	Rudi Walther	SPD
Hesse	125	Kassel	Horst Peter	SPD
Hesse	126	Werra-Meißner	Albert Nehm	SPD
Hesse	127	Schwalm-Eder	Albert Pfuhl	SPD
Hesse	128	Hersfeld	Berthold Wittich	SPD
Hesse	129	Marburg	Friedrich Bohl	CDU
Hesse	130	Lahn-Dill	Klaus Daubertshäuser	SPD
Hesse	131	Gießen	Erwin Horn	SPD
Hesse	132	Fulda	Alfred Dregger	CDU
Hesse	133	Hochtaunus	Manfred Langner	CDU
Hesse	134	Wetterau	Christian Schwarz-Schilling	CDU
Hesse	135	Rheingau-Taunus – Limburg	Michael Jung	CDU
Hesse	136	Wiesbaden	Hannelore Rönsch	CDU
Hesse	137	Hanau	Richard Bayha	CDU
Hesse	138	Frankfurt am Main I – Main-Taunus	Heinz Riesenhuber	CDU
Hesse	139	Frankfurt am Main II	Karl Becker	CDU
Hesse	140	Frankfurt am Main III	Helmut Link	CDU
Hesse	141	Groß-Gerau	Otto Zink	CDU
Hesse	142	Offenbach	Klaus Lippold	CDU
Hesse	143	Darmstadt	Helga Timm	SPD
Hesse	144	Odenwald	Alexander Warrikoff	CDU
Hesse	145	Bergstraße	Franz-Hermann Kappes	CDU
Hesse	List		Volker Hauff (Note: Volker Hauff resigned on 14 June 1989.)	SPD
Hesse	List		Gerhard Jahn	SPD
Hesse	List		Heinrich Klein (Note: Heinrich Klein died on 18 December 1989.)	SPD
Hesse	List		Bernd Reuter	SPD
Hesse	List		Dietrich Sperling	SPD
Hesse	List		Karsten Voigt	SPD
Hesse	List		Barbara Weiler	SPD
Hesse	List		Norbert Wieczorek	SPD
Hesse	List		Heidemarie Wieczorek-Zeul	SPD
Hesse	List		Fred Zander	SPD
Hesse	List		Klaus Kübler (Note: Klaus Kübler took office on 15 June 1989, to succeed Volker Hauff.)	SPD
Hesse	List		Gerd Jürgen Häuser (Note: Gerd Jürgen Häuser took office on 2 January 1990, to succeed Heinrich Klein.)	SPD
Hesse	List		Wilfried Böhm	CDU
Hesse	List		Christian Lenzer	CDU
Hesse	List		Gerhard O. Pfeffermann	CDU
Hesse	List		Adolf Roth	CDU
Hesse	List		Walter Wallmann	CDU
Hesse	List		Dieter Weirich (Note: Dieter Weirich took office on 29 April 1987, to succeed Walter Wallmann, but later resigned on 6 December 1989.)	CDU
Hesse	List		Anneliese Augustin (Note: Anneliese Augustin took office on 6 December 1989, to succeed Dieter Weirich.)	CDU
Hesse	List		Karitas Hensel	Greens
Hesse	List		Hubert Kleinert	Greens
Hesse	List		Gertrud Schilling	Greens
Hesse	List		Dietrich Wetzel	Greens
Hesse	List		Ekkehard Gries	FDP
Hesse	List		Wolfgang Mischnick	FDP
Hesse	List		Inge Segall	FDP
Hesse	List		Hermann Otto Solms	FDP
Rhineland-Palatinate	146	Neuwied	Heinz Schwarz	CDU
Rhineland-Palatinate	147	Ahrweiler	Karl Deres	CDU
Rhineland-Palatinate	148	Koblenz	Roswitha Verhülsdonk	CDU
Rhineland-Palatinate	149	Cochem	Waltrud Will-Feld	CDU
Rhineland-Palatinate	150	Kreuznach	Günther Leonhart	SPD
Rhineland-Palatinate	151	Bitburg	Peter Rauen	CDU
Rhineland-Palatinate	152	Trier	Günther Schartz	CDU
Rhineland-Palatinate	153	Montabaur	Joachim Hörster	CDU
Rhineland-Palatinate	154	Mainz	Johannes Gerster	CDU
Rhineland-Palatinate	155	Worms	Florian Gerster	SPD
Rhineland-Palatinate	156	Frankenthal	Horst Sielaff	SPD
Rhineland-Palatinate	157	Ludwigshafen	Manfred Reimann	SPD
Rhineland-Palatinate	158	Neustadt – Speyer	Theo Magin	CDU
Rhineland-Palatinate	159	Kaiserslautern	Rose Götte	SPD
Rhineland-Palatinate	160	Pirmasens	Klaus-Dieter Uelhoff	CDU
Rhineland-Palatinate	161	Südpfalz	Heiner Geißler	CDU
Rhineland-Palatinate	List		Peter Büchner	SPD
Rhineland-Palatinate	List		Karl Diller	SPD
Rhineland-Palatinate	List		Albrecht Müller	SPD
Rhineland-Palatinate	List		Günter Pauli	SPD
Rhineland-Palatinate	List		Eckhart Pick	SPD
Rhineland-Palatinate	List		Manfred Scherrer (Note: Manfred Scherrer resigned on 31 August 1990.)	SPD
Rhineland-Palatinate	List		Gudrun Weyel	SPD
Rhineland-Palatinate	List		Ralph Herberholz (Note: Ralph Herberholz took office on 1 September 1990, to succeed Manfred Scherrer.)	SPD
Rhineland-Palatinate	List		Hansjürgen Doss	CDU
Rhineland-Palatinate	List		Helmut Kohl	CDU
Rhineland-Palatinate	List		Heribert Scharrenbroich	CDU
Rhineland-Palatinate	List		Werner Weiß (Note: Werner Weiß died on 6 February 1990.)	CDU
Rhineland-Palatinate	List		Manfred Schneider (Note: Manfred Schneider took office on 8 February 1990, to succeed Werner Weiß.)	CDU
Rhineland-Palatinate	List		Wolfgang Rumpf (Note: Wolfgang Rumpf resigned on 6 August 1987.)	FDP
Rhineland-Palatinate	List		Helmut Schäfer	FDP
Rhineland-Palatinate	List		Dieter Thomae	FDP
Rhineland-Palatinate	List		Walter Hitschler (Note: Walter Hitschler took office on 7 August 1987, to succeed Wolfgang Rumpf.)	FDP
Rhineland-Palatinate	List		Uwe Hüser	Greens
Rhineland-Palatinate	List		Heike Wilms-Kegel	Greens
Baden-Württemberg	162	Stuttgart-Süd	Roland Sauer	CDU
Baden-Württemberg	163	Stuttgart-Nord	Herbert Czaja	CDU
Baden-Württemberg	164	Böblingen	Peter Petersen	CDU
Baden-Württemberg	165	Esslingen	Otto Hauser	CDU
Baden-Württemberg	166	Nürtingen	Anton Stark	CDU
Baden-Württemberg	167	Göppingen	Manfred Wörner (Note: Manfred Wörner resigned on 30 June 1988.)	CDU
Baden-Württemberg	168	Waiblingen	Paul Laufs	CDU
Baden-Württemberg	169	Ludwigsburg	Matthias Wissmann	CDU
Baden-Württemberg	170	Neckar-Zaber	Renate Hellwig	CDU
Baden-Württemberg	171	Heilbronn	Egon Susset	CDU
Baden-Württemberg	172	Schwäbisch Hall	Philipp Jenninger	CDU
Baden-Württemberg	173	Backnang – Schwäbisch Gmünd	Dieter Schulte	CDU
Baden-Württemberg	174	Aalen – Heidenheim	Manfred Abelein	CDU
Baden-Württemberg	175	Karlsruhe-Stadt	Rudolf Ruf	CDU
Baden-Württemberg	176	Karlsruhe-Land	Klaus Bühler	CDU
Baden-Württemberg	177	Rastatt	Bernhard Friedmann	CDU
Baden-Württemberg	178	Heidelberg	Udo Ehrbar	CDU
Baden-Württemberg	179	Mannheim I	Werner Nagel	SPD
Baden-Württemberg	180	Mannheim II	Roswitha Wisniewski	CDU
Baden-Württemberg	181	Odenwald – Tauber	Karl Miltner (Note: Karl Miltner resigned on 20 May 1988.)	CDU
Baden-Württemberg	182	Rhein-Neckar	Bernd Schmidbauer	CDU
Baden-Württemberg	183	Pforzheim	Lutz Stavenhagen	CDU
Baden-Württemberg	184	Calw	Hans-Joachim Fuchtel	CDU
Baden-Württemberg	185	Freiburg	Conrad Schroeder	CDU
Baden-Württemberg	186	Lörrach – Müllheim	Wilhelm Jung	CDU
Baden-Württemberg	187	Emmendingen – Lahr	Rainer Haungs	CDU
Baden-Württemberg	188	Offenburg	Wolfgang Schäuble	CDU
Baden-Württemberg	189	Rottweil – Tuttlingen	Franz Sauter	CDU
Baden-Württemberg	190	Schwarzwald-Baar	Hansjörg Häfele	CDU
Baden-Württemberg	191	Konstanz	Hans-Peter Repnik	CDU
Baden-Württemberg	192	Waldshut	Werner Dörflinger	CDU
Baden-Württemberg	193	Reutlingen	Anton Pfeifer	CDU
Baden-Württemberg	194	Tübingen	Jürgen Todenhöfer	CDU
Baden-Württemberg	195	Ulm	Herbert Werner	CDU
Baden-Württemberg	196	Biberach	Alois Graf von Waldburg-Zeil	CDU
Baden-Württemberg	197	Ravensburg – Bodensee	Elmar Kolb	CDU
Baden-Württemberg	198	Zollernalb – Sigmaringen	Hermann Schwörer	CDU
Baden-Württemberg	List		Brigitte Adler	SPD
Baden-Württemberg	List		Robert Antretter	SPD
Baden-Württemberg	List		Hermann Bachmaier	SPD
Baden-Württemberg	List		Rudolf Bindig	SPD
Baden-Württemberg	List		Andreas von Bülow	SPD
Baden-Württemberg	List		Peter Conradi	SPD
Baden-Württemberg	List		Herta Däubler-Gmelin	SPD
Baden-Württemberg	List		Gernot Erler	SPD
Baden-Württemberg	List		Ernst Haar	SPD
Baden-Württemberg	List		Gerlinde Hämmerle	SPD
Baden-Württemberg	List		Liesel Hartenstein	SPD
Baden-Württemberg	List		Gunter Huonker	SPD
Baden-Württemberg	List		Klaus Kirschner	SPD
Baden-Württemberg	List		Doris Odendahl	SPD
Baden-Württemberg	List		Wolfgang Roth	SPD
Baden-Württemberg	List		Harald B. Schäfer	SPD
Baden-Württemberg	List		Hermann Scheer	SPD
Baden-Württemberg	List		Hartmut Soell	SPD
Baden-Württemberg	List		Dieter Spöri (Note: Dieter Spöri resigned on 5 June 1988.)	SPD
Baden-Württemberg	List		Gert Weisskirchen	SPD
Baden-Württemberg	List		Ruth Zutt (Note: Ruth Zutt died on 29 June 1987.)	SPD
Baden-Württemberg	List		Marliese Dobberthien (Note: Marliese Dobberthien took office on 1 July 1987, to succeed Ruth Zutt, but later resigned on 29 August 1988.)	SPD
Baden-Württemberg	List		Klaus-Dieter Osswald (Note: Klaus-Dieter Osswald took office on 6 June 1988, to succeed Dieter Spöri.)	SPD
Baden-Württemberg	List		Konstanze Wegner (Note: Konstanze Wegner took office on 31 August 1988, to succeed Marliese Dobberthien.)	SPD
Baden-Württemberg	List		Martin Bangemann (Note: Martin Bangemann resigned on 5 January 1989.)	FDP
Baden-Württemberg	List		Olaf Feldmann	FDP
Baden-Württemberg	List		Georg Gallus	FDP
Baden-Württemberg	List		Martin Grüner	FDP
Baden-Württemberg	List		Helmut Haussmann	FDP
Baden-Württemberg	List		Ulrich Heinrich	FDP
Baden-Württemberg	List		Roland Kohn	FDP
Baden-Württemberg	List		Ursula Seiler-Albring	FDP
Baden-Württemberg	List		Wolfgang Weng	FDP
Baden-Württemberg	List		Ingrid Walz (Note: Ingrid Walz took office on 6 January 1989, to succeed Martin Bangemann.)	FDP
Baden-Württemberg	List		Uschi Eid	Greens
Baden-Württemberg	List		Dora Flinner	Greens
Baden-Württemberg	List		Willi Hoss	Greens
Baden-Württemberg	List		Alfred Mechtersheimer	Greens
Baden-Württemberg	List		Jutta Oesterle-Schwerin	Greens
Baden-Württemberg	List		Maria Luise Teubner	Greens
Baden-Württemberg	List		Christa Vennegerts	Greens
Baden-Württemberg	List		Honor Funk (Note: Honor Funk took office on 20 May 1988, to succeed Karl Miltner, but later resigned on 24 August 1989.)	CDU
Baden-Württemberg	List		Claus Jäger (Note: Claus Jäger took office on 1 July 1988, to succeed Manfred Wörner.)	CDU
Baden-Württemberg	List		Ortrun Schätzle (Note: Ortrun Schätzle took office on 25 August 1989, to succeed Honor Funk.)	CDU
Baden-Württemberg	List		Siegfried Hornung (Note: Siegfried Hornung took office on 6 February 1990, to succeed Bernhard Friedmann.)	CDU
Bavaria	199	Altötting	Karl-Heinz Spilker	CSU
Bavaria	200	Freising	Albert Probst	CSU
Bavaria	201	Fürstenfeldbruck	Eicke Götz	CSU
Bavaria	202	Ingolstadt	Horst Seehofer	CSU
Bavaria	203	Munich Centre	Hans Klein	CSU
Bavaria	204	Munich North	Fritz Wittmann	CSU
Bavaria	205	Munich East	Rudolf Kraus	CSU
Bavaria	206	Munich South	Erich Riedl	CSU
Bavaria	207	Munich West	Kurt Faltlhauser	CSU
Bavaria	208	Munich Land	Josef Linsmeier	CSU
Bavaria	209	Rosenheim	Wolfgang Zeitlmann	CSU
Bavaria	210	Starnberg	Wolfgang Gröbl	CSU
Bavaria	211	Traunstein	Matthias Engelsberger	CSU
Bavaria	212	Weilheim	Michaela Geiger	CSU
Bavaria	213	Deggendorf	Bartholomäus Kalb	CSU
Bavaria	214	Landshut	Friedrich Zimmermann	CSU
Bavaria	215	Passau	Klaus Rose	CSU
Bavaria	216	Rottal-Inn	Günther Müller	CSU
Bavaria	217	Straubing	Ernst Hinsken	CSU
Bavaria	218	Amberg	Hermann Fellner	CSU
Bavaria	219	Regensburg	Benno Zierer	CSU
Bavaria	220	Schwandorf	Dionys Jobst	CSU
Bavaria	221	Weiden	Max Kunz	CSU
Bavaria	222	Bamberg	Gerhard Scheu	CSU
Bavaria	223	Bayreuth	Ortwin Lowack	CSU
Bavaria	224	Coburg	Otto Regenspurger	CSU
Bavaria	225	Hof	Jürgen Warnke	CSU
Bavaria	226	Kulmbach	Lorenz Niegel	CSU
Bavaria	227	Ansbach	Carl-Dieter Spranger	CSU
Bavaria	228	Erlangen	Gerhard Friedrich	CSU
Bavaria	229	Fürth	Werner Dollinger	CSU
Bavaria	230	Nuremberg North	Oscar Schneider	CSU
Bavaria	231	Nuremberg South	Peter Wilhelm Höffkes	CSU
Bavaria	232	Roth	Richard Stücklen	CSU
Bavaria	233	Aschaffenburg	Norbert Geis	CSU
Bavaria	234	Bad Kissingen	Eduard Lintner	CSU
Bavaria	235	Main-Spessart	Alfred Biehle (Note: Alfred Biehle resigned on 27 April 1990.)	CSU
Bavaria	236	Schweinfurt	Michael Glos	CSU
Bavaria	237	Würzburg	Wolfgang Bötsch	CSU
Bavaria	238	Augsburg-Stadt	Stefan Höpfinger	CSU
Bavaria	239	Augsburg-Land	Eduard Oswald	CSU
Bavaria	240	Donau-Ries	Karl Heinz Lemmrich (Note: Karl Heinz Lemmrich resigned on 28 July 1988.)	CSU
Bavaria	241	Neu-Ulm	Theo Waigel	CSU
Bavaria	242	Oberallgäu	Ignaz Kiechle	CSU
Bavaria	243	Ostallgäu	Kurt Rossmanith	CSU
Bavaria	List		Max Amling	SPD
Bavaria	List		Georg Bamberg	SPD
Bavaria	List		Hans Büchler	SPD
Bavaria	List		Peter Glotz	SPD
Bavaria	List		Dieter Haack	SPD
Bavaria	List		Karl Kisslinger	SPD
Bavaria	List		Walter Kolbow	SPD
Bavaria	List		Uwe Lambinus	SPD
Bavaria	List		Robert Leidinger	SPD
Bavaria	List		Egon Lutz	SPD
Bavaria	List		Anke Martiny-Glotz (Note: Anke Martiny-Glotz resigned on 22 May 1989.)	SPD
Bavaria	List		Rudolf Müller	SPD
Bavaria	List		Konrad Porzner (Note: Konrad Porzner resigned on 2 October 1990.)	SPD
Bavaria	List		Manfred Schmidt	SPD
Bavaria	List		Renate Schmidt	SPD
Bavaria	List		Rudolf Schöfberger	SPD
Bavaria	List		Wolfgang Sieler	SPD
Bavaria	List		Sigrid Skarpelis-Sperk	SPD
Bavaria	List		Ludwig Stiegler	SPD
Bavaria	List		Jürgen Vahlberg	SPD
Bavaria	List		Günter Verheugen	SPD
Bavaria	List		Axel Wernitz	SPD
Bavaria	List		Hermann Wimmer	SPD
Bavaria	List		Hans de With	SPD
Bavaria	List		Susanne Kastner (Note: Susanne Kastner took office on 22 May 1989, to succeed Anke Martiny-Glotz.)	SPD
Bavaria	List		Karl Weinhofer (Note: Karl Weinhofer took office on 3 October 1990, to succeed Konrad Porzner.)	SPD
Bavaria	List		Norbert Eimer	FDP
Bavaria	List		Hans A. Engelhard	FDP
Bavaria	List		Josef Grünbeck	FDP
Bavaria	List		Hildegard Hamm-Brücher	FDP
Bavaria	List		Ulrich Irmer	FDP
Bavaria	List		Hans Paintner	FDP
Bavaria	List		Hermann Rind	FDP
Bavaria	List		Wolfgang Daniels	Greens
Bavaria	List		Gerald Häfner	Greens
Bavaria	List		Petra Kelly	Greens
Bavaria	List		Matthias Kreuzeder	Greens
Bavaria	List		Bärbel Rust	Greens
Bavaria	List		Halo Saibold	Greens
Bavaria	List		Michael Weiss	Greens
Bavaria	List		Ursula Männle	CSU
Bavaria	List		Alfred Sauter (Note: Alfred Sauter resigned on 6 July 1988.)	CSU
Bavaria	List		Franz Josef Strauss (Note: Franz Josef Strauss resigned on 19 March 1987.)	CSU
Bavaria	List		Friedrich Voss	CSU
Bavaria	List		Gerda Hasselfeldt (Note: Gerda Hasselfeldt took office on 24 March 1987, to succeed Franz Josef Strauss.)	CSU
Bavaria	List		Reinhold Kreile (Note: Reinhold Kreile took office on 11 July 1988, to succeed Alfred Sauter, but later resigned on 22 February 1990.)	CSU
Bavaria	List		Hans Graf Huyn (Note: Hans Graf Huyn took office on 2 August 1988, to succeed Karl Heinz Lemmrich.)	CSU
Bavaria	List		Peter Keller (Note: Peter Keller took office on 23 February 1990, to succeed Reinhold Kreile.)	CSU
Bavaria	List		Josef Brunner (Note: Josef Brunner took office on 5 May 1990, to succeed Alfred Biehle.)	CSU
Saarland	244	Saarbrücken I	Margit Conrad (Note: Margit Conrad resigned on 31 May 1990.)	SPD
Saarland	245	Saarbrücken II	Alwin Brück	SPD
Saarland	246	Saarlouis	Hans-Werner Müller	CDU
Saarland	247	St. Wendel	Johannes Ganz	CDU
Saarland	248	Homburg	Lothar Fischer	SPD
Saarland	List		Doris Pack (Note: Doris Pack resigned on 8 September 1989.)	CDU
Saarland	List		Werner Schreiber	CDU
Saarland	List		Trudi Schmidt (Note: Trudi Schmidt took office on 9 September 1989, to succeed Doris Pack.)	CDU
Saarland	List		Ottmar Schreiner	SPD
Saarland	List		Ursula Kugler (Note: Ursula Kugler took office on 1 June 1990, to succeed Margit Conrad.)	SPD
Saarland	List		Erika Trenz	Greens
Saarland	List		Uta Würfel	FDP
West Berlin			Lieselotte Berger (Note: Lieselotte Berger died on 26 September 1989.)	CDU
West Berlin			Helmut Buschbom	CDU
West Berlin			Jochen Feilcke	CDU
West Berlin			Joachim Kalisch	CDU
West Berlin			Peter Kittelmann	CDU
West Berlin			Peter Lorenz (Note: Peter Lorenz died on 6 December 1987.)	CDU
West Berlin			Heinrich Lummer	CDU
West Berlin			Christian Neuling	CDU
West Berlin			Gero Pfennig	CDU
West Berlin			Gerhard Schulze	CDU
West Berlin			Günter Straßmeir	CDU
West Berlin			Dietrich Mahlo (Note: Dietrich Mahlo took office on 9 December 1987, to succeed Peter Lorenz.)	CDU
West Berlin			Gabriele Rost (Note: Gabriele Rost took office on 26 September 1989, to succeed Lieselotte Berger, but later resigned on 16 February 1990.)	CDU
West Berlin			Gerhard Dewitz (Note: Gerhard Dewitz took office on 20 February 1990, to succeed Gabriele Rost.)	CDU
West Berlin			Jürgen Egert	SPD
West Berlin			Gerhard Heimann	SPD
West Berlin			Dagmar Luuk	SPD
West Berlin			Peter Mitzscherling (Note: Peter Mitzscherling resigned on 10 May 1989.)	SPD
West Berlin			Dietrich Stobbe	SPD
West Berlin			Hans-Jochen Vogel	SPD
West Berlin			Gerd Wartenberg	SPD
West Berlin			Nils Diederich (Note: Nils Diederich took office on 12 May 1989, to succeed Peter Mitzscherling.)	SPD
West Berlin			Ellen Olms (Note: Ellen Olms resigned on 20 February 1989.)	AL
West Berlin			Peter Sellin (Note: Peter Sellin resigned on 20 February 1989.)	AL
West Berlin			Sieglinde Frieß (Note: Sieglinde Frieß took office on 21 February 1989, to succeed Ellen Olms.)	AL
West Berlin			German Meneses Vogl (Note: German Meneses Vogl took office on 21 February 1989, to succeed Peter Sellin.)	AL
West Berlin			Hans-Günter Hoppe	FDP
West Berlin			Wolfgang Lüder	FDP
East Germany (Note: Members representing East Germany took office on 3 October 3, 1990, unless stated otherwise.)			Else Ackermann	CDU
East Germany			Michael Albrecht	CDU
East Germany			Lothar Barthel	CDU
East Germany			Harald Bauer	CDU
East Germany			Roland Becker	CDU
East Germany			Sabine Bergmann-Pohl	CDU
East Germany			Monika Brudlewsky	CDU
East Germany			Klaus-Peter Creter	CDU
East Germany			Wolfgang Dehnel	CDU
East Germany			Hans-Georg Dorendorf	CDU
East Germany			Wolfgang Ehlers	CDU
East Germany			Walter Fiedler	CDU
East Germany			Michael Fischer	CDU
East Germany			Hans Geisler	CDU
East Germany			Eberhard Goldhahn	CDU
East Germany			Martin Göttsching	CDU
East Germany			Gundolf Gries	CDU
East Germany			Gottfried Haschke	CDU
East Germany			Udo Haschke	CDU
East Germany			Joachim Holz	CDU
East Germany			Bertram Hönicke	CDU
East Germany			Susanne Jaffke	CDU
East Germany			Rainer Jork	CDU
East Germany			Jürgen Kleditzsch	CDU
East Germany			Ulrich Klinkert	CDU
East Germany			Dieter-Lebrecht Koch	CDU
East Germany			Hans-Ulrich Köhler	CDU
East Germany			Manfred Koslowski	CDU
East Germany			Günther Krause	CDU
East Germany			Wolfgang Krause	CDU
East Germany			Paul Krüger	CDU
East Germany			Katharina Landgraf	CDU
East Germany			Michael Leja	CDU
East Germany			Lothar de Maizière	CDU
East Germany			Dörte Martini zum Berge	CDU
East Germany			Maria Michalk	CDU
East Germany			Johannes Nitsch	CDU
East Germany			Claudia Nolte	CDU
East Germany			Joachim Hubertus Nowack	CDU
East Germany			Gisbert Paar	CDU
East Germany			Uwe Patzig	CDU
East Germany			Angelika Pfeiffer	CDU
East Germany			Rosemarie Priebus	CDU
East Germany			Rolf Rau	CDU
East Germany			Klaus Rauber	CDU
East Germany			Stefanie Rehm	CDU
East Germany			Klaus Reichenbach	CDU
East Germany			Heinz Rother	CDU
East Germany			Eberhard Scharf	CDU
East Germany			Christa Schmidt	CDU
East Germany			Frank Schmidt	CDU
East Germany			Reiner Schneider	CDU
East Germany			Clemens Schwalbe	CDU
East Germany			Karl-Ernst Selke	CDU
East Germany			Ingeborg Tamm	CDU
East Germany			Olaf Thees	CDU
East Germany			Willibald Toscher	CDU
East Germany			Dietmar-Richard Unger	CDU
East Germany			Heinz Wagner	CDU
East Germany			Kersten Wetzel	CDU
East Germany			Bertram Wieczorek	CDU
East Germany			Michael Wonneberger	CDU
East Germany			Hans Zimmermann	CDU
East Germany			Andreas Amende	SPD
East Germany			Angelika Barbe	SPD
East Germany			Frank Bogisch	SPD
East Germany			Gerhard Botz	SPD
East Germany			Heidrun Dräger	SPD
East Germany			Konrad Elmer	SPD
East Germany			Christina Fritsch	SPD
East Germany			Martin Gutzeit	SPD
East Germany			Hans-Joachim Hacker	SPD
East Germany			Frank Heltzig	SPD
East Germany			Stephan Hilsberg	SPD
East Germany			Manfred Kalz	SPD
East Germany			Karl-August Kamilli	SPD
East Germany			Constanze Krehl	SPD
East Germany			Hinrich Kuessner	SPD
East Germany			Christine Lucyga	SPD
East Germany			Hans-Jürgen Misselwitz	SPD
East Germany			Luise Morgenstern	SPD
East Germany			Edelbert Richter	SPD
East Germany			Volker Schemmel	SPD
East Germany			Emil Schnell	SPD
East Germany			Richard Schröder	SPD
East Germany			Christian Friedrich Schultze	SPD
East Germany			Rolf Schwanitz	SPD
East Germany			Per-René Seeger	SPD
East Germany			Wieland Sorge	SPD
East Germany			Volker Stephan	SPD
East Germany			Ulrich Stockmann	SPD
East Germany			Wolfgang Thierse	SPD
East Germany			Sabine Uecker	SPD
East Germany			Bernd Voigtländer	SPD
East Germany			Reinhard Weis	SPD
East Germany			Gunter Weißgerber	SPD
East Germany			Ingrid Bittner	PDS
East Germany			Marlies Deneke	PDS
East Germany			Dagmar Enkelmann	PDS
East Germany			Sabine Fache	PDS
East Germany			Ursula Fischer	PDS
East Germany			Michael Friedrich	PDS
East Germany			Ruth Fuchs	PDS
East Germany			Gregor Gysi	PDS
East Germany			Uwe-Jens Heuer	PDS
East Germany			Sylvia-Yvonne Kaufmann	PDS
East Germany			Dietmar Keller	PDS
East Germany			Norbert Kertscher	PDS
East Germany			Hans Modrow	PDS
East Germany			Marion Morgenstern	PDS
East Germany			Christine Ostrowski	PDS
East Germany			Gerhard Riege	PDS
East Germany			Martina Schönebeck	PDS
East Germany			Fritz Schumann	PDS
East Germany			Michael Schumann	PDS
East Germany			Ilja Seifert	PDS
East Germany			Klaus Steinitz	PDS
East Germany			Roswitha Stolfa	PDS
East Germany			Solveig Wegener	PDS
East Germany			Dieter Annies	FDP
East Germany			Jürgen Bohn	FDP
East Germany			Konrad Felber	FDP
East Germany			Gerry Kley	FDP
East Germany			Conrad-Michael Lehment	FDP
East Germany			Rainer Ortleb	FDP
East Germany			Dieter Wöstenberg	FDP
East Germany			Klaus-Otto Zirkler	FDP
East Germany			Georg Zschornack	FDP
East Germany			Stefan Gottschall	DSU
East Germany			Jürgen Haschke	DSU
East Germany			Sabine Landgraf	DSU
East Germany			Thomas Schmidt	DSU
East Germany			Joachim Schmiele	DSU
East Germany			Andreas Steiner	DSU
East Germany			Frank Tiesler	DSU
East Germany			Hansjoachim Walther	DSU
East Germany			Marianne Birthler	Greens
East Germany			Joachim Gauck (Note: Joachim Gauck took office on 3 October 1990, as a member representing East Germany, but later resigned on 4 October 1990.)	Greens
East Germany			Werner Schulz	Greens
East Germany			Hans-Jochen Tschiche	Greens
East Germany			Wolfgang Ullmann	Greens
East Germany			Ernst Paul Dörfler	Greens
East Germany			Matthias Platzeck	Greens
East Germany			Vera Lengsfeld (Note: Vera Lengsfeld took office on 5 October 1990, to succeed Joachim Gauck.)	Greens
East Germany			Thomas Klein	VL

== See also ==
- Politics of Germany
- List of Bundestag Members
