= Barthel =

Barthel may refer to:

== People ==
- E. J. Barthel (born 1985), American football player
- Ernst Barthel (1890–1953), Alsatian mathematician and philosopher, friend of Albert Schweitzer
- Johann Caspar Barthel (1697–1771), German Jesuit canon lawyer
- Josy Barthel (1927–1992), Luxembourgish Olympic athlete
- Karl Barthel (1907–1974), German politician
- Klaus Barthel (born 1955), German politician of the SPD
- Kurt Barthel (fl. mid-20th century), founder of the American nudist movement
- Lothar Barthel (born 1937), German politician
- Marc Barthel (born 1989), German actor
- Marcel Barthel (born 1990), German professional wrestler
- Max Barthel (1893–1975) German author
- Mona Barthel (born 1990), German tennis player
- René Barthel (born 1982), German politician
- Thomas Barthel (1923–1997), German ethnologist and epigrapher
- Trond Barthel (born 1970), Norwegian champion pole-vaulter
- Barthel Beham (1502–1540), German engraver, miniaturist, and painter
- Barthel Schink (1927–1944), German youth member of the Ehrenfeld Group, an anti-Nazi resistance group

== Other ==
- Barthel, Saskatchewan, Canada
- Barthel scale, a scale used to measure performance in basic activities of daily living
- Lycée Technique Josy Barthel, a high school in Luxembourg
- Stade Josy Barthel, a former national stadium of Luxembourg
