= Gisela Oechelhaeuser =

German cabaret artist

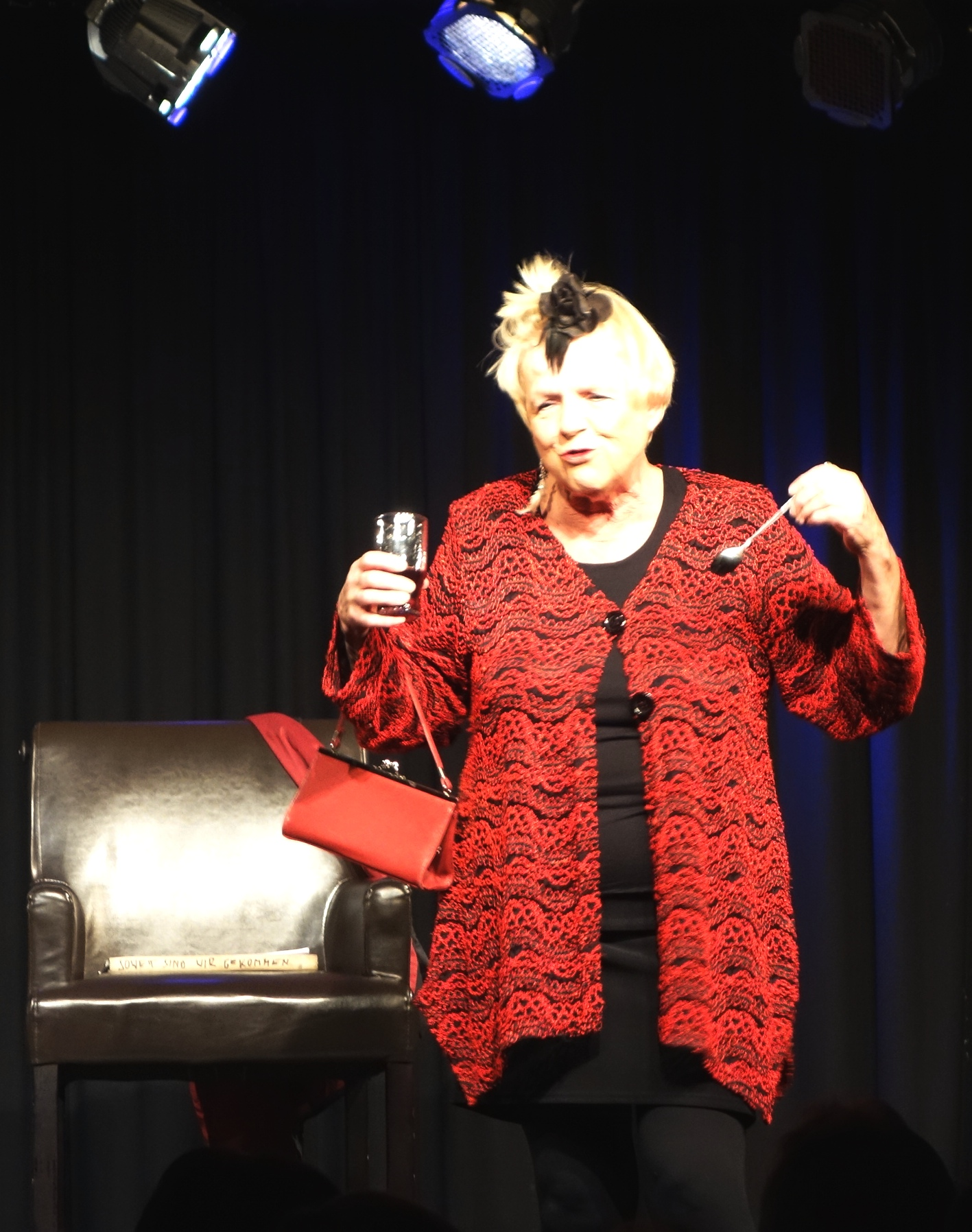
- Oechelhaeuser in 2015
- Born: Gisela Ekardt; 22 January 1944; Schmauch, East Prussia, Germany
- Education: Leipzig
- Occupations: Cabaret artiste and impresario
- Spouse(s): 1. _____ Oechelhaeuser; 2. Dietmar Keller
- Children: 1

Gisela Oechelhaeuser (born Gisela Ekardt, 22 January 1944) is a German cabaret performer and impresario with a doctorate in modern languages. Her career was adversely affected in 1999 when it was disclosed that twenty years earlier, while at university, she actively operated as a paid informer for the Ministry for State Security under the one- party German dictatorship of that time.

== Biography ==
Gisela Ekardt was born, the youngest of her parents' four daughters, in Schmauch, a little village in the marshy flatlands south of what was at that time known as Königsberg in East Prussia. She never knew her "Nazi father", as she described him in 1962 to a young journalist from - unusually - the west, during an encounter in connection with a rare "Gesamtdeutschland" festival in the main square at Weimar. Her father was a Lutheran pastor who died in France during the war. Caught up in the ethnic cleansing of 1944/45, the widowed mother and her children ended up in Apolda, a small manufacturing town near Jena in Thüringia, which was administered as part of the Soviet occupation zone till October 1949, and which was where the children grew up. (The Soviet occupation zone was relaunched in 1949 as the Soviet sponsored German Democratic Republic (East Germany).) The girls' mother worked in a pastoral capacity for Moritz Mitzenheim, the local bishop who had extensive administrative responsibilities for the Lutheran church in the region. Mrs. Ekardt was pious and, on occasion, a guilt-wracked woman. As Gisela would later recall, "She accepted us [her daughters] as we were, without preconceptions. Of the 200 Marks that she received each month, she tithed a tenth for those who had even less than we did. For me she did not even have the 35 pfennigs necessary for a piece of fish in a bread-roll. That bothered me, but I never asked her to save the money she gave to the others people". (Note: "Sie hat uns angenommen, wie wir waren, voraussetzungslos. Von den 200 Mark, die sie im Monat hatte, hat sie den Zehnten abgegeben für die, die noch weniger hatten. Für mich hatte sie beim Rummel nicht mal mehr die 35 Pfennige fürs Fischbrötchen. Das ärgerte mich, aber ich hätte sie nie gebeten, es bei andern einzusparen.")

1962 was the year of Gisela Ekardt's school leaving exam (Abitur). She came top of her year-group. That, under most circumstances, would have opened the way to university-level education. At the end of the summer she learned that she would not be attending university that autumn/fall, however. She wrote about it in a letter that got through to the youthful journalist from Stuttgart whom she had befriended at the celebrations in Weimar earlier in the summer. It was not just her "bourgeois provenance" that told against her, but her mother's commitment to Christianity. Mention of her "Nazi father" was also repeated along with a term much favoured by the East German authorities at that time, "Klassenfeind" ("Class enemy"). Oechelhaeuser had always wanted to make a career on the stage, but when she was 20 she was rejected by the stage school. For the next three years she worked in the large wrist-watch factory at Weimar, producing "four-thousand movement-levers a day". Later she was promoted to the "precision component" section.

After three years at the wrist-watch factory a friend suggested that she should apply to study for a teaching qualification. She was admitted to the prestigious Karl Marx University (as it was known at the time) in Leipzig which she attended between 1965 and 1973. Her studies embraced both Germanistics and Romanistics. It was during this period that she married _____ Oechelhaeuser (first name not publicly known). The couple's son, Sebastian, was born in 1971.

She stayed on at Leipzig to receive her doctorate in 1975 for a dissertation on "problems of the Aesthetic Theory of the 'Critical theory' of the Frankfurt School". (Note: "Zu Problemen der ästhetischen Theorie der ‚Kritischen Theorie' der Frankfurter Schule") The work focused on the philosophers Max Horkheimer and Theodor W. Adorno, two of the more high-profile Frankfurt School philosophers of the twentieth century. She was told, after her dissertation had been presented for evaluation that her work had been excellent, but that her work had suffered from an important omission: there had been nothing included about Adorno's "Soviet research". Relating this to an interviewer many years later Oechelhaeuser insisted that Adorno's "Soviet research" did not and never had existed, but she took the admonition as indicating that her failure to obtain a "cum laude" commendation for her doctoral work was the result of politically driven intervention by party officials.

Gisela Oechelhaeuser's energies during her time in Leipzig were not applied only to her academic studies. In 1966 she was a co-founder of the cabaret group "academixer" (initially identified more prosaically as the "Amateur cabaret of the Karl-Marx-University Leupzig". In 1976 the company turned professional. However, she later had to sever her links with "academixe" on account of the appointment as a deputy culture minister of the man to whom she was by that time married. During the 1980s she was appearing as a cabaret artist and undertaking directorial assignments at the "Herkuleskeule" cabaret in Dresden. During the later 1980s she was also appearing regularly at the Distel Cabaret Theatre in Berlin, where in 1989 she became "Intendantin" (loosely, "theatre manager"). On the basis of her success in the world of cabaret in Saxony she was able to add teaching to her activities, employed between 1985 and 1990 as a stagecraft teacher at the Ernst Busch Academy of Dramatic Arts in Berlin.

Despite her evident ambition, and despite repeated signs that her political profile was likely to be holding her back, she later told an interviewer that it was only in the 1970s that she joined the party. Her mother wept as she installed herself in the living room and without even removing her hat announced that she knew now that history was the history of the class struggle. Socialism meant no war, none should go hungry, everyone should be able to read and write. Her mother pointed out that all the important stuff was already in the bible. But party membership provided a certain identity and self-worth that was not available from the bible: "I am elected to such and such a committee. I'm capable. You have to discuss with me".

- "A good cabaret artist must get used to the idea that audiences clap when you fall off the stage: they think it's part of the show ...."
- "Ein guter Kabarettist muss sich mit dem Gedanken anfreunden, dass die Leute auch dann klatschen, wenn er tot von der Bühne fällt – weil sie glauben, das gehört auch zum Stück ..."
Gisela Oechelhaeuser interviewed by Hannes Hofmann in 2014

By the 1980s she was becoming a leading figure in the mainstream arts establishment of the German Democratic Republic. In September 1984 she became vice-president of the national Committee for entertainment art, a post she held till 1989

- "Satire has to push things right to the extreme edge. That brings people to laughter and then it makes them think - about events that cry out for consideration ...."
- "Satire muss Dinge ganz auf die Spitze treiben. Das bringt Leute zum Lachen und damit zum Nachdenken – über Geschehnisse, die zum Heulen sind ..."
Gisela Oechelhaeuser interviewed by Hannes Hofmann in 2014

The Distel Cabaret Theatre in East Berlin and its "Intendantin" negotiated the reunification transition much more successfully than many East German institutions: Oechelhaeuser remained in charge till 1999, promoting a positive left-wing brand of political cabaret that resonated with Berlin audience members, especially those from the former east, during a decade when some were surprised to discover that western freedoms involved forfeiting many of the eastern certainties - not all of them disagreeable - that comrades had grown up taking for granted. She also, during the 1990s, worked on television, notably as moderator on the ORB-Television programme "Am Tag, als ...". Part of the programme's mandate was to "shed light on under-exposed chapters from the history of the German Democratic Republic".

In 1999, following research involving the Stasi Records Agency, it became known that for three years between 1976 and 1980, during her time in Leipzig, Gisela Oechelhaeuser had signed up to operate as one of approximately 200,000 Stasi informants ("inoffizieller Mitarbeiter)"). She was identified in Stasi files as "IM-Gisela". The files showed she had provided her handlers with character sketches of subordinates at the cabaret, including rumours or suspicions of Nazi personal histories. After the information emerged she agreed to talk about that period in her life to reporters. She had never "denounced" anyone and believed she had not actually "stuck the knife" into anyone, but she had certainly acted as judge over people who had trusted her. And she despised herself for what she had done. "A political cabaret artiste who works with the Stasi takes as much risk as a diver in a bathtub". When knowledge of her Stasi involvement became public Oechelhaeuser stepped down temporarily from her administrative role at the Distel Cabaret Theatre: the next day her resignation from the Distel became permanent. Her stage career was far from over, however: she has continued to perform as a free-lance cabaret artiste, chiefly in venues in the "New federal states" (former East Germany). Her performances include both her own political solo programme and a programme dedicated to the memory of the writer and Upper Saxon dialect poet Lene Voigt.

== Personal ==
Gisela Oechelhaeuser has told interviewers that long before the Berlin Wall came down in 1989 the siblings with whom she had grown up had made their way to and settled in West Germany.

Sources are silent about her first marriage, but she has spoken with pride about her son, Sebastian Oechelhaeuser, who in 1993, aged 22, was about to embark on a course of study in London. In an interview a few years later she recalled with affection the filial judgement, "Mother, you're never going to grow up completely." (Note: "Mutter, du wirst wohl nie erwachsen.") On another occasion she recalled her reaction when, accompanying her son while he was undertaking support work at a retirement home, she overheard a conversation when he was sent to the hospital wing and issued with sterile gloves: "You simply can't comfort people of you're wearing gloves", (Note: "Mit Handschuhen kann man gar nicht trösten.") the young man had protested. Oechelhaeuser's reaction on overhearing this was a feeling of inner reassurance that she had bought up the boy properly.

Her second marriage is more widely reported. Between 1980 and 1995 she was married to Dietmar Keller, a political insider whose career and beliefs placed him close to the heart of the party establishment. In 1989 Keller served as Minister for Culture in the short-lived Modrow government. After reunification he sat as a member of the German parliament ("Bundestag") between 1990 and 1994. According to one source it was, indeed, the early stages of Oechelhaeuser's relationship with Dietmar Keller that put an end to her three-year stint as a Stasi informer. Most of her reports to her handlers dealt with casual discussions of a potentially "conspiratorial" nature in the student canteen or in the course of student seminars. The reports were received, reviewed and filed in a routine manner. They concerned post graduate students ("intellectuals") and sometimes political cabaret performers all of whom were, by definition, of interest to the inherently paranoid security services; but these were not "high-profile" targets. When her reports started to include casual indiscretions of a potentially political nature that had been uttered by Dietmar Keller, who was already a senior figure within the party hierarchy in the Leipzig area, the reports also ended up in the files. But such reports on a respected senior party official also generated confusion and anger among the Leipzig Stasi officers. Somehow the security services no longer welcomed reports from "IM-Gisela" after she teamed up with Keller.
