= Hamm – Unna II =

Federal electoral district of Germany

Coordinates: 51°39′46″N 7°41′45″E

144 Hamm – Unna II
- Electoral district for the Bundestag
- Hamm – Unna II in 2025
- State: North Rhine-Westphalia
- Population: 321,900 (2019)
- Electorate: 231,226 (2021)
- Major settlements: Hamm; Lünen
- Area: 422.4 km^{2}

Current electoral district
- Created: 1980
- Party: SPD
- Member: Michael Thews
- Elected: 2013, 2017, 2021, 2025

Hamm – Unna II is an electoral constituency (German: Wahlkreis) represented in the Bundestag. It elects one member via first-past-the-post voting. Under the current constituency numbering system, it is designated as constituency 144. It is located in the Ruhr region of North Rhine-Westphalia, comprising the city of Hamm and the northern part of the district of Unna.

Hamm – Unna II was created for the 1980 federal election. Since 2013, it has been represented by Michael Thews of the Social Democratic Party (SPD).

== Geography ==
Hamm – Unna II is located in the Ruhr region of North Rhine-Westphalia. As of the 2021 federal election, it comprises the independent city of Hamm as well as the municipalities of Lünen, Selm, and Werne from the Unna district.

== History ==
Hamm – Unna II was created in 1980. In the 1980 through 1998 elections, it was constituency 117 in the numbering system. From 2002 through 2009, it was number 146. In the 2013 through 2021 elections, it was number 145. From the 2025 election, it has been number 144. Its borders have not changed since its creation.

== Members ==
The constituency has been held continuously by the Social Democratic Party (SPD) since its creation. It was first represented by Udo Fiebig from 1980 to 1987. Dieter Wiefelspütz was then representative from 1987 to 2013. Michael Thews was elected in 2013, and re-elected in 2017, 2021 and 2025.

| Election | Member | Party | % |
|---|---|---|---|
| 1980 | Udo Fiebig | SPD | 54.0 |
| 1983 | Udo Fiebig | SPD | 48.2 |
| 1987 | Dieter Wiefelspütz | SPD | 49.0 |
| 1990 | Dieter Wiefelspütz | SPD | 48.0 |
| 1994 | Dieter Wiefelspütz | SPD | 49.9 |
| 1998 | Dieter Wiefelspütz | SPD | 55.4 |
| 2002 | Dieter Wiefelspütz | SPD | 54.3 |
| 2005 | Dieter Wiefelspütz | SPD | 55.0 |
| 2009 | Dieter Wiefelspütz | SPD | 43.9 |
| 2013 | Michael Thews | SPD | 43.2 |
| 2017 | Michael Thews | SPD | 36.4 |
| 2021 | Michael Thews | SPD | 40.6 |
| 2025 | Michael Thews | SPD | 32.2 |

== Election results ==
=== 2025 election ===
Federal election (2025): Hamm – Unna II
| Notes: | Blue background denotes the winner of the electorate vote. Pink background denotes a candidate elected from their party list. Yellow background denotes an electorate win by a list member, or other incumbent. A ✓ or ✗ denotes status of any incumbent, win or lose respectively. | | | | | | |
| Party | Candidate | Votes | % | ±% | Party votes | % | ±% |
|---|---|---|---|---|---|---|---|
| SPD | ✓ Michael Thews | 58,098 | 32.2 | ▼8.3 | 41,847 | 23.1 | ▼12.2 |
| CDU | Arnd Hilwig | 54,188 | 30.1 | ▲3.6 | 51,262 | 28.4 | ▲4.2 |
| AfD | Georg Schroeter | 38,695 | 21.5 | ▲12.2 | 38,096 | 21.1 | ▲11.8 |
| Left | Sefika Minte | 12,866 | 7.1 | ▲3.4 | 13,545 | 7.5 | ▲4.1 |
| Greens | Nelli Soumaoro | 11,585 | 6.4 | ▼3.7 | 14,776 | 8.2 | ▼3.3 |
| BSW | | | | | 8,203 | 4.5 | |
| FDP | Lucas Slunjski | 4,810 | 2.7 | ▼4.5 | 6,099 | 3.4 | ▼6.6 |
| Tierschutzpartei | | | | | 2,768 | 1.5 | ▼0.1 |
| PARTEI | | | | | 945 | 0.5 | ▼0.4 |
| Volt | | | | | 866 | 0.5 | ▲0.3 |
| FW | | | | ▼1.6 | 741 | 0.4 | ▼0.3 |
| Team Todenhöfer | | | | | 512 | 0.3 | ▼0.6 |
| dieBasis | | | | ▼0.9 | 325 | 0.2 | ▼0.5 |
| PdF | | | | | 298 | 0.2 | ▲0.1 |
| BD | | | | | 278 | 0.2 | |
| MERA25 | | | | | 97 | 0.1 | |
| Values | | | | | 81 | 0.0 | |
| MLPD | | | | | 45 | 0.0 | 0.0 |
| Pirates | | | | | | | ▼0.4 |
| Gesundheitsforschung | | | | | | | ▼0.2 |
| Humanists | | | | | | | ▼0. |
| Bündnis C | | | | | | | ▼0.1 |
| ÖDP | | | | | | | ▼0.1 |
| SGP | | | | | | | 0.0 |
| Informal votes | | 1,718 | | | 1,716 | | |
| Total valid votes | | 180,242 | | | 180,784 | | |
| Turnout | | 181,960 | 79.9 | ▲6.9 | | | |
| SPD hold | Majority | 3,910 | 2.1 | ▼4.7 | | | |

=== 2021 election ===
Federal election (2021): Hamm – Unna II
| Notes: | Blue background denotes the winner of the electorate vote. Pink background denotes a candidate elected from their party list. Yellow background denotes an electorate win by a list member, or other incumbent. A ✓ or ✗ denotes status of any incumbent, win or lose respectively. | | | | | | |
| Party | Candidate | Votes | % | ±% | Party votes | % | ±% |
|---|---|---|---|---|---|---|---|
| SPD | ✓ Michael Thews | 67,774 | 40.6 | ▲4.2 | 59,227 | 35.4 | ▲3.9 |
| CDU | Arnd Hilwig | 44,266 | 26.5 | ▼8.7 | 40,444 | 24.2 | ▼6.2 |
| Greens | Martin Kesztyüs | 16,958 | 10.2 | ▲5.8 | 19,149 | 11.4 | ▲6.2 |
| AfD | Robert Hennig | 15,562 | 9.3 | ▼1.1 | 15,497 | 9.3 | ▼2.0 |
| FDP | Lucas Slunjski | 12,058 | 7.2 | ▲1.3 | 16,764 | 10.0 | ▼0.4 |
| Left | Rebekka Kämpfe | 6,285 | 3.8 | ▼2.1 | 5,694 | 3.4 | ▼3.6 |
| Tierschutzpartei | | | | | 2,680 | 1.6 | ▲0.8 |
| PARTEI | | | | | 1,574 | 0.9 | ▲0.3 |
| Team Todenhöfer | | | | | 1,406 | 0.8 | |
| FW | Folke Hellmig | 2,610 | 1.6 | ▲0.8 | 1,242 | 0.7 | ▲0.4 |
| dieBasis | Dominik Pfau | 1,539 | 0.9 | | 1,164 | 0.7 | |
| Pirates | | | | | 640 | 0.4 | ▼0.2 |
| Volt | | | | | 372 | 0.2 | |
| LIEBE | | | | | 267 | 0.2 | |
| Gesundheitsforschung | | | | | 264 | 0.2 | 0.0 |
| NPD | | | | | 238 | 0.1 | ▼0.2 |
| LfK | | | | | 159 | 0.1 | |
| Humanists | | | | | 113 | 0.1 | 0.0 |
| Bündnis C | | | | | 110 | 0.1 | |
| ÖDP | | | | | 99 | 0.1 | 0.0 |
| V-Partei3 | | | | | 82 | 0.0 | 0.0 |
| du. | | | | | 81 | 0.0 | |
| PdF | | | | | 58 | 0.0 | |
| LKR | | | | | 38 | 0.0 | |
| DKP | | | | | 31 | 0.0 | 0.0 |
| MLPD | | | | | 23 | 0.0 | ▼0.1 |
| SGP | | | | | 12 | 0.0 | 0.0 |
| Informal votes | | 1,708 | | | 1,332 | | |
| Total valid votes | | 167,052 | | | 167,428 | | |
| Turnout | | 168,760 | 73.0 | ▲0.1 | | | |
| SPD hold | Majority | 23,508 | 14.1 | ▲12.9 | | | |

=== 2017 election ===
Federal election (2017): Hamm – Unna II
| Notes: | Blue background denotes the winner of the electorate vote. Pink background denotes a candidate elected from their party list. Yellow background denotes an electorate win by a list member, or other incumbent. A ✓ or ✗ denotes status of any incumbent, win or lose respectively. | | | | | | |
| Party | Candidate | Votes | % | ±% | Party votes | % | ±% |
|---|---|---|---|---|---|---|---|
| SPD | ✓ Michael Thews | 61,717 | 36.4 | ▼6.8 | 53,467 | 31.5 | ▼7.0 |
| CDU | Sylvia Jörrißen | 59,700 | 35.2 | ▼4.1 | 51,475 | 30.3 | ▼6.5 |
| AfD | Pierre Jung | 17,713 | 10.4 | | 19,068 | 11.2 | ▲7.9 |
| FDP | Beate Oertel | 9,970 | 5.9 | ▲3.8 | 17,678 | 10.4 | ▲6.7 |
| Left | Sven Kleinemeier | 9,949 | 5.9 | ▲0.2 | 11,837 | 7.0 | ▲0.7 |
| Greens | Eckhard Kneisel | 7,409 | 4.4 | ▼0.6 | 8,938 | 5.3 | ▼0.8 |
| AD-DEMOKRATEN | | | | | 1,384 | 0.8 | |
| Tierschutzpartei | | | | | 1,336 | 0.8 | |
| PARTEI | | | | | 1,170 | 0.7 | ▲0.4 |
| Pirates | Martin Kesztyüs | 1,871 | 1.1 | ▼1.3 | 944 | 0.6 | ▼1.5 |
| FW | Helmut Stalz | 1,239 | 0.8 | ▼0.1 | 605 | 0.4 | ▼0.1 |
| NPD | | | | | 547 | 0.3 | ▼0.9 |
| Gesundheitsforschung | | | | | 194 | 0.1 | |
| Volksabstimmung | | | | | 173 | 0.1 | ▼0.1 |
| V-Partei³ | | | | | 153 | 0.1 | |
| DM | | | | | 144 | 0.1 | |
| DiB | | | | | 141 | 0.1 | |
| BGE | | | | | 134 | 0.1 | |
| ÖDP | | | | | 110 | 0.1 | 0.0 |
| MLPD | | | | | 110 | 0.1 | 0.0 |
| Die Humanisten | | | | | 72 | 0.0 | |
| DKP | | | | | 38 | 0.0 | |
| SGP | | | | | 17 | 0.0 | 0.0 |
| Informal votes | | 1,956 | | | 1,789 | | |
| Total valid votes | | 169,568 | | | 169,735 | | |
| Turnout | | 171,524 | 72.9 | ▲2.6 | | | |
| SPD hold | Majority | 2,017 | 1.2 | ▼2.7 | | | |

=== 2013 election ===
Federal election (2013): Hamm – Unna II
| Notes: | Blue background denotes the winner of the electorate vote. Pink background denotes a candidate elected from their party list. Yellow background denotes an electorate win by a list member, or other incumbent. A ✓ or ✗ denotes status of any incumbent, win or lose respectively. | | | | | | |
| Party | Candidate | Votes | % | ±% | Party votes | % | ±% |
|---|---|---|---|---|---|---|---|
| SPD | Michael Thews | 71,174 | 43.2 | ▼0.7 | 63,646 | 38.5 | ▲5.1 |
| CDU | Sylvia Jörrißen | 64,871 | 39.3 | ▲6.6 | 60,984 | 36.9 | ▲5.1 |
| Left | Udo Gabriel | 9,277 | 5.6 | ▼1.4 | 10,399 | 6.3 | ▼3.3 |
| Greens | Marie Dazert | 8,250 | 5.0 | ▼0.4 | 9,990 | 6.0 | ▼1.7 |
| AfD | | | | | 5,523 | 3.3 | |
| Pirates | Martin Böckel | 3,930 | 2.4 | | 3,465 | 2.1 | ▲0.3 |
| FDP | Christoph Dammermann | 3,439 | 2.1 | ▼7.0 | 6,153 | 3.7 | ▼8.4 |
| NPD | Hans-Jochen Voß | 2,913 | 1.8 | 0.0 | 2,064 | 1.2 | 0.0 |
| FW | | 1,058 | 0.6 | | 683 | 0.4 | |
| PARTEI | | | | | 555 | 0.3 | |
| PRO | | | | | 457 | 0.3 | |
| Volksabstimmung | | | | | 298 | 0.2 | ▲0.1 |
| REP | | | | | 281 | 0.2 | ▼0.2 |
| BIG | | | | | 236 | 0.1 | |
| Nichtwahler | | | | | 129 | 0.1 | |
| ÖDP | | | | | 123 | 0.1 | 0.0 |
| Party of Reason | | | | | 118 | 0.1 | |
| Die Rechte | | | | | 92 | 0.1 | |
| RRP | | | | | 76 | 0.0 | ▼0.1 |
| MLPD | | | | | 66 | 0.0 | 0.0 |
| PSG | | | | | 33 | 0.0 | 0.0 |
| BüSo | | | | | 21 | 0.0 | 0.0 |
| Informal votes | | 2,426 | | | 1,946 | | |
| Total valid votes | | 164,912 | | | 165,392 | | |
| Turnout | | 167,338 | 70.3 | ▲0.5 | | | |
| SPD hold | Majority | 6,303 | 3.9 | ▼7.2 | | | |

=== 2009 election ===
Federal election (2009): Hamm – Unna II
| Notes: | Blue background denotes the winner of the electorate vote. Pink background denotes a candidate elected from their party list. Yellow background denotes an electorate win by a list member, or other incumbent. A ✓ or ✗ denotes status of any incumbent, win or lose respectively. | | | | | | |
| Party | Candidate | Votes | % | ±% | Party votes | % | ±% |
|---|---|---|---|---|---|---|---|
| SPD | ✓ Dieter Wiefelspütz | 72,446 | 43.9 | ▼11.1 | 55,249 | 33.4 | ▼14.5 |
| CDU | Laurenz Meyer | 54,088 | 32.8 | 0.0 | 52,623 | 31.8 | ▲0.8 |
| FDP | Jörg van Essen | 14,952 | 9.1 | ▲4.6 | 19,998 | 12.1 | ▲4.6 |
| Left | Alisan Sengül | 11,638 | 7.0 | ▲2.8 | 15,917 | 9.6 | ▲4.2 |
| Greens | Adrian Mork | 8,993 | 5.4 | ▲3.1 | 12,798 | 7.7 | ▲2.3 |
| Pirates | | | | | 2,889 | 1.7 | |
| NPD | Hans-Joachim Voß | 2,981 | 1.8 | ▲0.7 | 2,113 | 1.3 | ▲0.3 |
| Tierschutzpartei | | | | | 1,049 | 0.6 | ▲0.2 |
| FAMILIE | | | | | 810 | 0.5 | ▲0.1 |
| RENTNER | | | | | 675 | 0.4 | |
| REP | | | | | 536 | 0.3 | ▼0.1 |
| RRP | | | | | 241 | 0.1 | |
| DVU | | | | | 206 | 0.1 | |
| Volksabstimmung | | | | | 120 | 0.1 | 0.0 |
| ÖDP | | | | | 88 | 0.1 | |
| Centre | | | | | 66 | 0.0 | 0.0 |
| MLPD | | | | | 60 | 0.0 | 0.0 |
| BüSo | | | | | 26 | 0.0 | 0.0 |
| PSG | | | | | 26 | 0.0 | ▼0.1 |
| Informal votes | | 2,324 | | | 1,932 | | |
| Total valid votes | | 165,098 | | | 165,490 | | |
| Turnout | | 167,422 | 69.8 | ▼7.0 | | | |
| SPD hold | Majority | 18,358 | 11.1 | ▼11.1 | | | |

=== 2005 election ===
Federal election (2005): Hamm – Unna II
| Notes: | Blue background denotes the winner of the electorate vote. Pink background denotes a candidate elected from their party list. Yellow background denotes an electorate win by a list member, or other incumbent. A ✓ or ✗ denotes status of any incumbent, win or lose respectively. | | | | | | |
| Party | Candidate | Votes | % | ±% | Party votes | % | ±% |
|---|---|---|---|---|---|---|---|
| SPD | ✓ Dieter Wiefelspütz | 100,141 | 55.0 | ▲0.7 | 87,460 | 47.9 | ▼2.6 |
| CDU | Laurenz Meyer | 59,652 | 32.8 | ▼2.8 | 56,557 | 31.0 | ▼1.6 |
| FDP | Jörg van Essen | 8,038 | 4.4 | ▼0.9 | 13,752 | 7.5 | ▼0.2 |
| Left | Udo Gabriel | 7,690 | 4.2 | ▲3.1 | 9,847 | 5.4 | ▲4.4 |
| Greens | Jochen Nadolski-Voigt | 4,195 | 2.3 | ▼1.4 | 9,941 | 5.4 | ▼0.5 |
| NPD | Axel Thieme | 2,026 | 1.1 | | 1,705 | 0.9 | ▲0.7 |
| Tierschutzpartei | | | | | 864 | 0.5 | ▲0.1 |
| Familie | | | | | 758 | 0.4 | ▲0.2 |
| REP | | | | | 722 | 0.4 | ▼0.1 |
| GRAUEN | | | | | 457 | 0.3 | ▲0.1 |
| PARTEI | Arne Müseler | 366 | 0.2 | | | | |
| PBC | | | | | 173 | 0.1 | |
| From Now on... Democracy Through Referendum | | | | | 136 | 0.1 | |
| Socialist Equality Party | | | | | 75 | 0.0 | |
| MLPD | | | | | 66 | 0.0 | |
| Centre | | | | | 49 | 0.0 | |
| BüSo | | | | | 32 | 0.0 | 0.0 |
| Informal votes | | 3,139 | | | 2,653 | | |
| Total valid votes | | 182,108 | | | 182,594 | | |
| Turnout | | 185,247 | 7638 | ▼2.0 | | | |
| SPD hold | Majority | 40,489 | 22.2 | | | | |
