= Michael Thews =

German politician

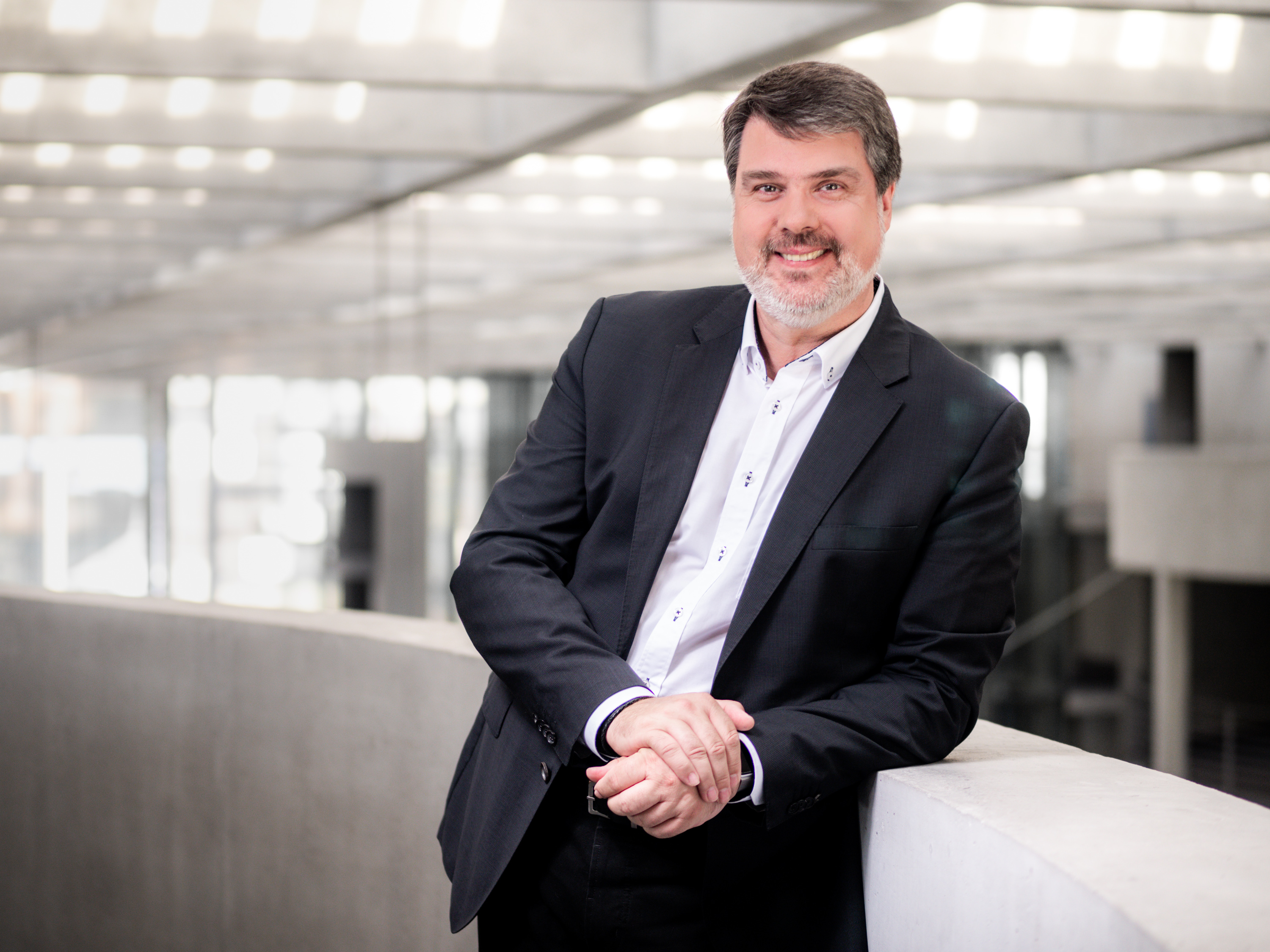
- Michael Thews in 2019

Member of the Bundestag
- Incumbent
- Assumed office 2013

Personal details
- Born: Michael Eckardt Thews; 6 September 1964 (age 62) Bremerhaven, West Germany (now Germany)
- Party: SPD
- Education: Paderborn University

Michael Eckardt Thews (born 6 September 1964) is a German engineer and politician of the SPD who has been serving as a member of the Bundestag from the state of North Rhine-Westphalia since 2013.

== Early life and education ==
Born in Bremerhaven, Bremen, Thews studied at the Paderborn University.

== Political career ==
Thews first became a member of the Bundestag in the 2013 German federal election, representing the Hamm – Unna II district.

In parliament, Thews has been a member of the Committee on the Environment, Nature Conservation and Nuclear Safety (since 2013) and the Budget Committee (since 2021). From 2018 to 2021, he served on the Parliamentary Advisory Board on Sustainable Development. In this capacity, he has been his parliamentary group's spokesperson on sustainable development (2018–2021) and its rapporteur on the circular economy (since 2021).

In addition to his committee assignments, Thews is part of the German-Israeli Parliamentary Friendship Group and the German-Canadian Parliamentary Friendship Group.

== Other activities ==
- Nuclear Waste Disposal Fund (KENFO), Alternate Member of the Board of Trustees (since 2022)
- IG BCE, Member
