= Georg Schroeter =

Member of the Bundestag from North Rhine-Westphalia
- Incumbent
- Assumed office 2025

Personal details
- Born: 26 August 1950 (age 75) Hamm, North Rhine-Westphalia
- Party: AfD (since 2013)
- Other political affiliations: FDP (until 2003)

Georg Paul Schroeter (born 26 August 1950) is a German politician from the Alternative for Germany. He was elected to the Bundestag in the 2025 German federal election.

== Biography ==
After graduating, Schroeter initially worked for a large electrical engineering company. For 30 years, he has been self-employed as the owner of an engineering firm and a public company. He is a member of the Federal Association of Small and Medium-Sized Businesses

Initially, Schroeter was a member of the Free Democratic Party (FDP); according to his own statements, he left this party after the death of Jürgen Möllemann.

He has been a member of the AfD since 2013 and a founding member of the Hamm district association. Since 2020, he has been a member of the Hamm City Council for the AfD.

In the 2025 German federal election, he was a direct candidate in the constituency of Hamm – Unna II. He won 38,695 first votes and was elected on the state list.

=== Personal life ===
Schroeter has been married for more than 50 years.
