= Hans-Joachim Hoffmann =

East German politician and party functionary (1929–1994)

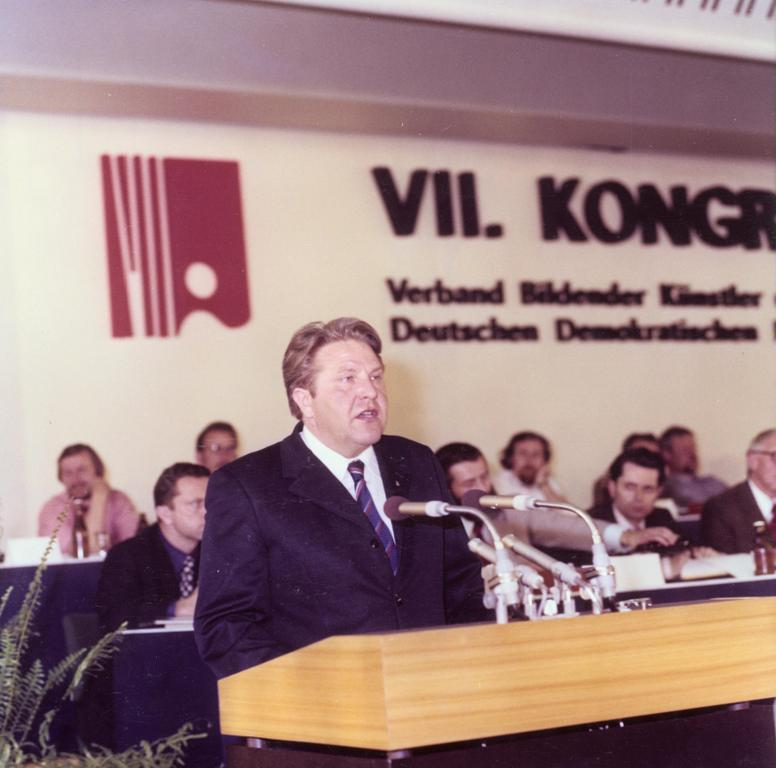
- Hoffmann in 1974

Minister of Culture
- In office 17 January 1973 – 18 November 1989
- Chairman of the Council of Ministers: Willi Stoph; Horst Sindermann; Willi Stoph
- First Deputy: Kurt Löffler; Dietmar Keller
- Preceded by: Klaus Gysi
- Succeeded by: Dietmar Keller

Head of the Culture Department of the Central Committee
- In office 2 November 1971 – 16 January 1973
- Secretary: Kurt Hager
- Deputy: Kurt Löffler
- Preceded by: Arno Hochmuth
- Succeeded by: Peter Heldt
Volkskammer
Member of the Volkskammer for Dresden-Nord, Dresden-Ost
In office 29 October 1976 – 5 April 1990
Preceded by	Hans Wiesner
Succeeded by	Constituency abolished

Personal details
- Born: Hans-Joachim Hoffmann; 10 October 1929 Bunzlau, Province of Lower Silesia, Free State of Prussia, Weimar Republic (now Bolesławiec, Poland)
- Died: 19 July 1994 (aged 64) Berlin, Germany
- Cause of death: Heart attack
- Resting place: Grünau Forest Cemetery
- Party: Socialist Unity Party (1946–1989)
- Other political affiliations: Communist Party of Germany (1945–1946)
- Education: Karl Marx Party Academy (Dipl.-Ges.-Wiss.)
- Occupation: Politician; Party Functionary; Electrician
- Central institution membership: 1976–1989: Full member, Central Committee; Other offices held: 1970–1971: Second Secretary, Socialist Unity Party in Bezirk Leipzig; 1969–1970: Secretary for Science, Education and Culture, Socialist Unity Party in Bezirk Leipzig; 1966–1969: Secretary for Agitation and Propaganda, Socialist Unity Party in Bezirk Leipzig; 1960–1962: First Secretary, Socialist Unity Party in Eilenburg district

Hans-Joachim "Jochen" Hoffmann (10 October 1929 – 19 July 1994) was a German politician and party functionary of the Socialist Unity Party (SED). Hoffmann rose to become an influential culture policymaker during Erich Honecker's rule over East Germany, briefly serving as head of the SED Central Committee Culture Department and later minister of culture before having to step down during the Peaceful Revolution.

== Life and career ==
=== Early career and Bezirk Leipzig SED ===
Hans-Joachim Hoffmann was born in Bunzlau (then part of the Prussian Province of Lower Silesia) on 10 October 1929. He trained as an electrical technician and worked in the field from 1945 to 1948. In 1945, he joined the Communist Party of Germany (KPD) and, following the forced merger of the SPD and KPD in 1946, became a member of the Socialist Unity Party (SED). From 1948 onward, he held various positions in the Free German Youth (FDJ) and the SED at district and Bezirk levels, including first secretary of the Leipzig FDJ, secretary for agitation and propaganda of the Bezirk Leipzig FDJ and of the Leipzig SED.

From 1953 to 1955, he attended the SED's Karl Marx Party Academy in Berlin, graduating with a diploma in social sciences (Dipl.-Ges.-Wiss.). Afterward, in 1960, he was made first secretary of the SED in the mostly rural Bezirk Leipzig district of Eilenburg, joining the SED's nomenklatura. Hoffmann rose to the Bezirk Leipzig SED Secretariat in 1966, first serving as secretary for agitation and propaganda, before being made secretary for science, education and culture in 1969. He was finally promoted to second in command in November 1970, when Second Secretary Horst Schumann acceded to lead the Bezirk Leipzig SED following Paul Fröhlich's death.

=== SED Central Committee and Minister of Culture ===
On 2 November 1971, the SED Central Committee appointed Hoffmann head of the Central Committee Culture Department. When the 6th session of the Central Committee of the SED in May 1972 abandoned the dogmatic cultural postulates of the notorious 11th Plenum of 1965, Hoffmann argued for a broad concept of culture and a realistic interpretation of conflict in art.

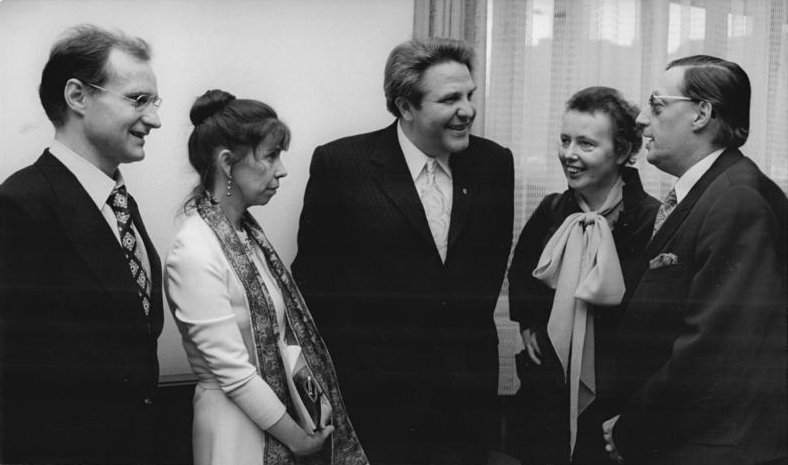
Hoffmann (center) meeting various actors and screenwriters in February 1973

Almost two years later, he succeeded Klaus Gysi, who was made the East Germany's first ambassador to Italy, as minister of culture. He additionally become a full member of the SED Central Committee in May 1976 (IX. Party Congress) and a member of the Volkskammer in October the same year, nominally representing northeast Dresden. The following year, Hoffmann also joined the Presidium of the Cultural Association of the GDR.

As Minister, Hoffmann was considered one of the "liberals" in government. His tenure was marked by the exodus of East German artists, including the expatriation of Wolf Biermann, which he was besmirched by. Hoffmann tried to mediate between artists and the SED's cultural policy. Hoffmann enjoyed a good reputation among artists, later being described by Unsere Zeit as "Artists' advocate". His tenure also coincided with the reconstruction of many cultural institutions such as the Friedrichstadt-Palast or the Semperoper. In 1974, he was awarded the Patriotic Order of Merit.

=== Peaceful Revolution ===
During the Gorbachev era, Hoffmann publicly supported Perestroika in a September 1988 interview with the West German theater journal Theater heute, using the title quote, "The safest course is change." In the interview, Hoffmann not only expressed sympathy for Gorbachev's political approach, but also refused to call the theatre people who had left East Germany traitors. In the aftermath of this interview he was summoned by Kurt Hager, the Central Committee Secretary responsible for culture and member of the Politburo, who tried to pressure him to resign. After the meeting, Hoffmann suffered his first heart attack. Hoffmann however refused to be intimidated, despite being in poor health. From that point on, his phone calls were deliberately monitored, yet he demonstratively continued to defend GDR artists.

Hoffmann also opposed the ban on the Soviet magazine Sputnik and a number of Soviet films. Against the wishes of Hans Modrow and Egon Krenz, he resigned during the Peaceful Revolution alongside rest of the government led by Willi Stoph on 7 November 1989, and was succeeded by his first deputy Dietmar Keller.

=== Reunified Germany ===
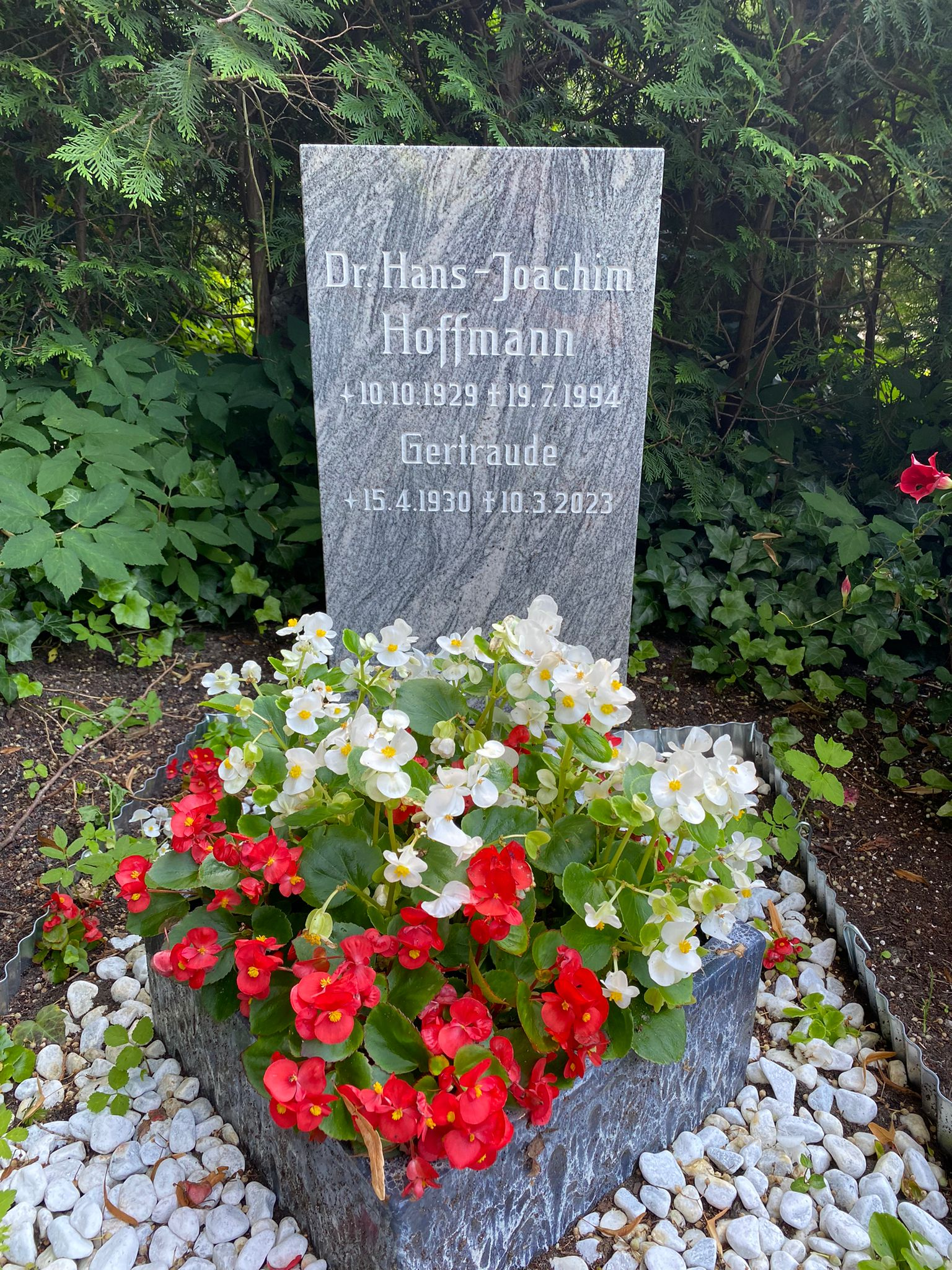
Hoffmann's grave in 2024

With his self-taught computer skills, he trained former officials in IT skills as part of an employment subsidy scheme. When the job was cut, Hoffmann's health deteriorated. He died of his second heart attack on 19 July 1994 in Berlin at the age of 64 and was buried in the Grünau Forest Cemetery.

In 2023, the German Literature Archive in Marbach acquired a collection of letters from Hoffmann's estate. These letters, dating back to 1983, include responses from prominent East Germans to Hoffmann's inquiry about their reading habits and preferences. The correspondents also mentioned books they would like to read if they were available in East Germany. Contributors included Waldemar Cierpinski, Peter Hacks, Sigmund Jähn, Gret Palucca, Werner Tübke, and Christa Wolf.
