= Klaus-Peter Creter =

German politician

Member of the Bundestag
- In office 3 October 1990 – 20 December 1990

Personal details
- Born: 8 April 1943 Gera, Germany
- Died: 18 October 2025 (aged 82)
- Party: CDU

Klaus-Peter Creter (8 April 1943 – 18 October 2025) was a German politician of the Christian Democratic Union (CDU) and former member of the German Bundestag.

== Life ==
Creter joined the GDR CDU in 1972, where he was local chairman, later deputy district chairman and from 1989 on district chairman in the city of Gera. In 1990, he was elected to the last Volkskammer, after which he was a member of the Bundestag for three months.

== Literature ==
Herbst, Ludolf; Jahn, Bruno (2002). Vierhaus, Rudolf (ed.). Biographisches Handbuch der Mitglieder des Deutschen Bundestages. 1949–2002 [Biographical Handbook of the Members of the German Bundestag. 1949–2002] (in German). München: De Gruyter - De Gruyter Saur. p. 1715. ISBN 978-3-11-184511-1.
