= Karl Barthel =

German politician (1907–1974)

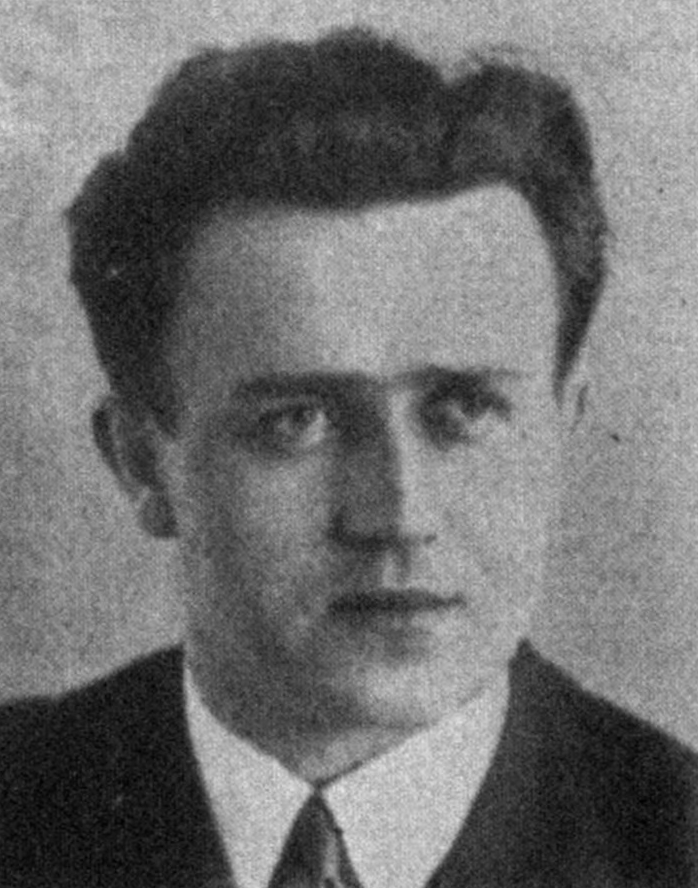
Official Reichstag portrait, c. 1932

Karl Barthel (20 March 1907 – 21 February 1974) was a German politician, Communist member of the Reichstag during the Weimar Republic, concentration camp survivor, Socialist Unity Party of Germany official, and author.

== Life ==
Barthel was a born in Lohmen, Saxony to the ropemaker Clemens Barthel, who was an unsuccessful electoral candidate for the Social Democratic Party of Germany in 1898. He began as a toolmaker at the Ernemann factory in Dresden, a renowned manufacturer of photography equipment. He became a member of the German Metal Workers' Union (DMV) and in 1923 joined the Young Communist League of Germany (KJVD) and the Communist Party (KPD). In 1924 he became one of the first to be laid off in the wake of the financial crisis and hyperinflation of 1923.

In 1927, he completed a training course for the KJVD at the Reichsparteischule for the Communist Party, and became KJVD district leader for eastern Saxony. He was sent by Conrad Blenkle and Fritz Rau to participate in the provincial party secretariat of the Communist Party in Suhl, Thuringia. The leader of the secretariat Hans Tittel was a supporter of Heinrich Brandler, who had fallen out of favour with leading members of the KPD and with Moscow. In order to remove the so-called "right-wing dissenters", the party demanded that the Thuringian KPD pass a resolution on the decisions of the 4th Session of the Central Council in Moscow. Walter Ulbricht was present for the vote on the proposals. Because of their "deviation from the party line", the so-called Brandlerists were then expelled. Ernst Thälmann then lauded praise upon the KJVD Thuringia under Karl Barthel. Many of the expelled supporters of Brandler went on to form the Communist Party of Germany (Opposition).

=== Parliamentary career ===
In December 1929 Barthel was elected to the Thuringian Landtag as the youngest member of the KPD faction. In 1930 he first met his future wife, Leni Streng, later to be a chemist.

After a short time on the editorial board of the newspaper "Freedom" ("Freiheit") in Düsseldorf, in November 1931 Barthel was in Kassel and was confirmed by the Central Committee of the Communist Party following the recommendations of Thalmann and John Schehr to the post of political secretary for Hesse-Waldeck as successor to Ernst Lohagen. In the 6th election (1932) he became one of the 89 deputies of the KPD in the Reichstag. In November 1932 he married Leni Streng. On 7 February 1933, he took part in the last meeting of the central committee in the Sportshaus Ziegenhals. After the Reichstag fire three weeks later, Barthel and all the other KPD deputies were declared criminals. Walter Ulbricht commissioned him as an instructor for Lower and Upper Silesia.

=== Arrest and sentence ===
On 28 November 1933, Barthel was arrested by the Gestapo in Breslau at a meeting with the local KJVD district leaders and was held in the custody of Edmund Heines. Three weeks later, he was removed to a private facility of the Marine SA following the discovery of an alleged escape route of which he was unaware. In his own communication, he merely confirmed the statements made the people with whom he met. On 28 March 1934, Barthel was imprisoned as a "police protection detainee" (Polizeischutzhäftling) in the Graupestraße prison in Breslau, and was sentenced in November to two and a half years in prison and five years of loss of civil rights (Ehrverlust). He was first transferred to a jail in Wohlau, then to the Lichtenburg concentration camp, and finally to the Buchenwald concentration camp.

=== Imprisonment in Buchenwald ===
"The life of every prisoner in the concentration camp was constantly surrounded by death. Extreme restraint, vigilance, cunning and luck were needed if the prisoner wanted to avoid the threat of annihilation." (translated from "Rot färbt sich der Morgen")

Barthel's block elder Hans Bremer along with he second block elder Oskar Fischer, in retroactive revenge for the "Felseneck process" and in place of two escaped criminals. Barthel worked in SS service buildings and was occasionally able to listen to Radio Beromünster. Following the 1939 release of the first KPD Reichstag deputy from imprisonment in a concentration camp, Theodor Neubauer, Barthel was contacted by his wife. Through co-operative SS members such as the mechanic Hans Prinzler, he was able to smuggle out his manuscript to her, which was later published as Die Welt ohne Erbarmen ("The world without mercy") in the German Democratic Republic.

In 1944, Barthel was sent to the Weimar Mews (Marstall Weimar) for 14 days, during which he was held in the same building where the disgraced former concentration camp commander Karl Otto Koch was imprisoned. He later declared that many Communist prisoners were killed after the Gestapo became aware of their being previously subjected to violent interrogations. Barthel himself was taken back to concentration camp without questioning.

Barthel's friends in the concentration camp included Alois Neumann, later Minister of Justice of Czechoslovakia, who escaped from Czechoslovakia in 1939 (then the "Czech protectorate" under German control) and also Dr. Plojar. After the bomb attack by the US Air Force on 24 August 1944, Barthel was able to use his keys to the SS drink cellar to provide water to many of the wounded, including Rudolf Breitscheid and the Italian Princess Mafalda of Savoy, but both succumbed to their injuries.

=== Post-war period ===
After the war, the Soviet Military Administration in Germany appointed Barthel on 14 July 1945 to the position of mayor of Jena. Later after the merger of the KPD and SPD into the Socialist Unity Party of Germany (SED), he became an SED member and director of public utilities in Jena. He died in Jena in 1974, aged 66.

== Writings ==
- Die Welt ohne Erbarmen. Bilder und Skizzen aus dem K.Z., with woodcuts by Hans Schneider. Greifenverlag: Rudolstadt 1946.
- Rot färbt sich der Morgen. Erinnerungen. Greifenverlag: Rudolstadt 1958.
