= Ulrich Briefs =

German politician

Ulrich Briefs (21 February 1939 – 7 June 2005) was a German politician.

== Early life ==
He was born in Düsseldorf.

== Political career ==
In the 1987 West German federal election he was elected in North Rhine-Westphalia on the party list for the Greens.

On 1 October 1990 he left the Green caucus. In the 1990 German federal election, he was elected on the party list in Saxony for the Party of Democratic Socialism.

== Death ==
Briefs died in Posterholt, Netherlands.
