= Susanne Kastner =

German politician

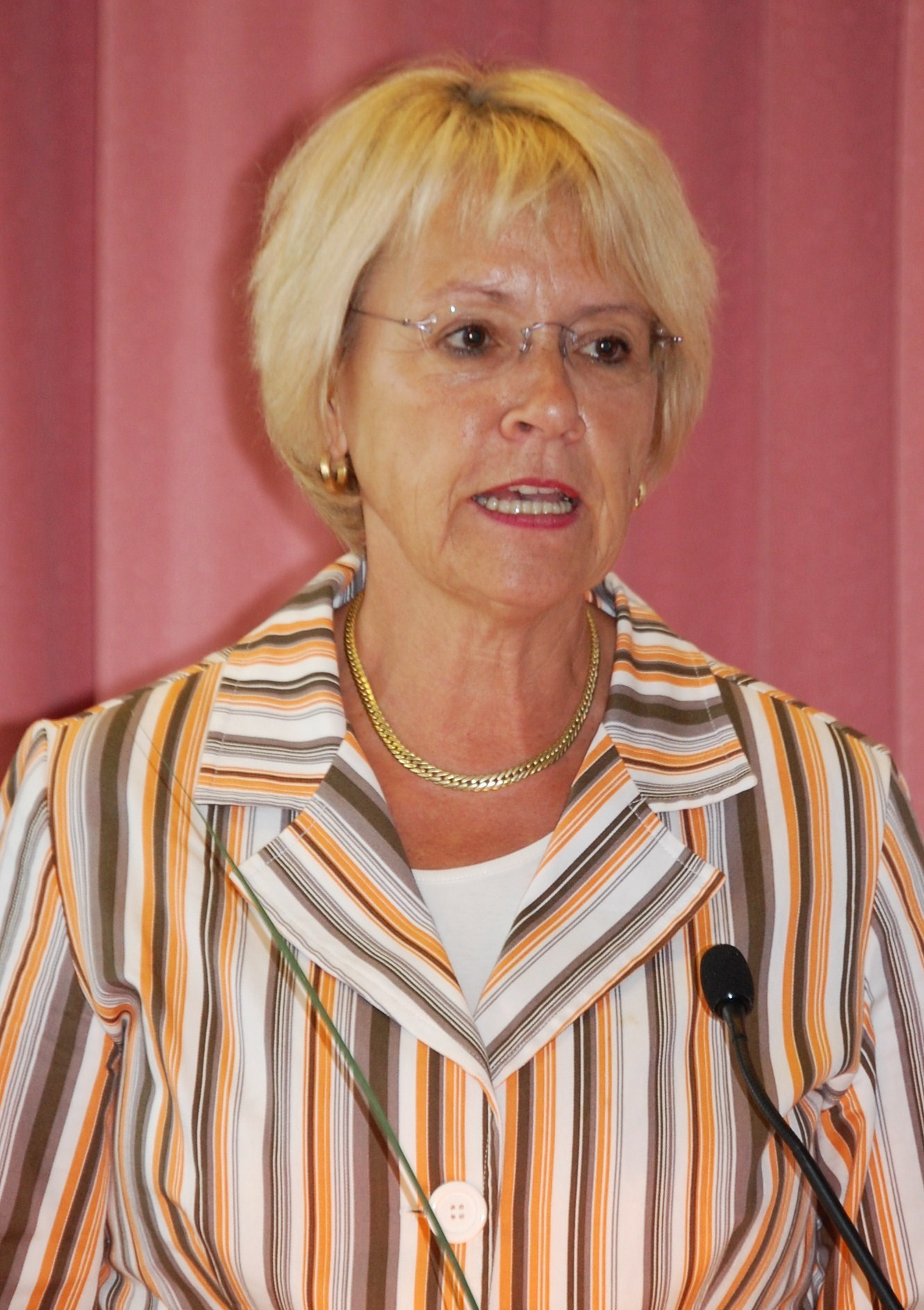
Kastner in 2009

Susanne Kastner (born 11 December 1946 in Karlstadt am Main, Bavaria) of the Social Democratic Party is a German politician who was one of the Vice-presidents of the Bundestag from 2002 to 2009.

== Early life ==
She worked as a primary and secondary school teacher and educator for Religious Pedagogy in Munich until 1989. She is a member of the IG Bergbau, Chemie, Energie workers union, the Arbeiterwohlfahrt, the Bavarian Red Cross and the Stiftung Kinder Soforthilfe, and the chairwoman of the Rumänien-Soforthilfe e. V. and the German-Romanian Forum e. V.

== Political career ==
She entered the Bavarian State Association of the Social Democratic Party, the BayernSPD in 1972. She was elected to the Bundestag three times from Bad Kissingen, the first time in May 1989. From 1998 to 2002, Kastner was the managing director of the SPD in the Bundestag and served as one of the Vice-presidents of the Bundestag from October 2002 to September 2009. She retired from the Bundestag in 2013.

== Personal life ==
Kastner, a Lutheran Christian, is married and has three children and eight grandchildren.

== Honours ==
Kastner has been awarded the following honours:

- Honorary doctorate from Aurel Vlaicu University in Arad, Romania
- Bavarian Order of Merit
- German Order of Merit am Bande
- Honorary citizenship of the Romanian towns of Lipova and Sibiu
- Grand Officer rank of the Romanian Order of Merit

== Further sources ==
- "14. Bundestag".
- "15. Bundestag".
- "16. Bundestag".
- "17. Bundestag".
- "Mut zu neuen Wegen, Neugier auf die Welt: Vizepräsidentin Susanne Kastner (SPD)".
- "Seit 2002 im Amt: Vizepräsidentin Susanne Kastner".
