= Gerhard Dewitz =

German politician

Member of the Bundestag
- In office 20 February 1990 – 20 December 1990

Personal details
- Born: 16 December 1926 Küstrin
- Died: 24 May 2008 (aged 81)
- Party: CDU

Gerhard Dewitz (December 16, 1926 – May 24, 2008) was a German politician of the Christian Democratic Union (CDU) and former member of the German Bundestag.

== Life ==
Dewitz was an administrator by profession. He joined the CDU in 1958. On February 20, 1990, he succeeded Gabriele Rost, who had left the party, as representative of Berlin in the German Bundestag and remained a member until the end of the parliamentary term in the same year.

== Literature ==
Herbst, Ludolf; Jahn, Bruno (2002). Vierhaus, Rudolf (ed.). Biographisches Handbuch der Mitglieder des Deutschen Bundestages. 1949–2002 [Biographical Handbook of the Members of the German Bundestag. 1949–2002] (in German). München: De Gruyter - De Gruyter Saur. p. 1715. ISBN 978-3-11-184511-1.
