= Dieter Annies =

German politician

Member of the Bundestag
- In office 3 October 1990 – 20 December 1990

Personal details
- Born: 1 December 1942 (age 83) Elbing / Ostpreußen
- Party: FDP

Dieter Annies (born 1 December 1942) is a German politician of the Free Democratic Party (FDP) and former member of the German Bundestag.

== Life ==
For the elections to the Volkskammer on 18 March 1990, he was placed third on the list of the electoral alliance Die Liberalen in his electoral district and moved into the Volkskammer as a member of parliament. On 28 September 1990, Annies was elected to the Bundestag by the Volkskammer of the GDR, where he remained as a member of parliament for the Free Democratic Party (FDP) until 20 December.

== Literature ==
Herbst, Ludolf; Jahn, Bruno (2002). Vierhaus, Rudolf (ed.). Biographisches Handbuch der Mitglieder des Deutschen Bundestages. 1949–2002 [Biographical Handbook of the Members of the German Bundestag. 1949–2002] (in German). München: De Gruyter - De Gruyter Saur. p. 1715. ISBN 978-3-11-184511-1.
