= Marc Barthel =

German singer, actor, songwriter, and dubbing actor

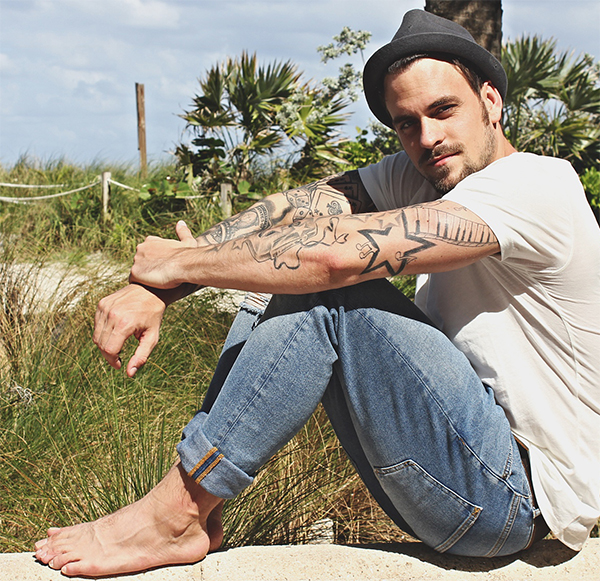
- Marc Barthel in Miami on 2016

Background information
- Also known as: Jesse D'Lane
- Born: Marc Ulrich Barthel; October 4, 1989 (age 36); Berlin, Germany
- Occupations: Singer, actor, voice actor
- Years active: 2001–present
- Formerly of: Part Six

Marc Ulrich Barthel (born October 4, 1989) known mononymously as Jesse D'Lane, is a singer, actor, songwriter and dubbing actor from Berlin, Germany. He was one of the lead and former members of a German boy band named Part Six, which slightly looks like US5.

== Early life ==
Marc was born in Berlin on 1989. Marc began his training in singing and choreography at the age of 12.

== Career ==
=== Singing ===
In 2006, Marc successfully took part in a casting of the youth magazine Yam, which was looking for the sixth member for the boy band Part Six. He released two singles and one album with the band before leaving the band after coming of age in 2007 and pursuing his career as a solo artist under the alias Jesse D'Lane. He changed his style and recorded songs. In 2011 he released his first album Black & White , as well as the singles "Alles wird gut" "Soldier", "Maybe" and "So Beautiful".

=== Acting ===
He works as an actor under the name Marc Barthel. In 2008 he appeared in an episode of Turkish for Beginners. He then starred in the films The Gunman – Game Becomes Serious (2008), Darling, Wake Up the Chickens (2009) and Blissestrasse (2011). In November 2012, he appeared in Good Times, Bad Times for a few episodes . From 2013 to February 2014 he appeared in Berlin – Tag & Nacht in the supporting role "John Fehrs" in more than 140 episodes. In 2013 he appeared alongside Yvonne Catterfeld in the music drama Just One Night. From 2014 to 2015 he played the role of Tim Helmke in the ARD series Banned Love alongside Sila Sahin. Since 2019 he has been playing police officer Kris Freiberg in the ZDF series Notruf Hafen Kante .

== Personal life ==
In February 2018, Marc and Anna Hofbauer announced their relationship. A son was born in November 2019. On December 26, 2020, the couple married. They both live in Hamburg.
