= René Barthel =

German politician (born 1982)

Member of the Landtag of Saxony-Anhalt
- Incumbent
- Assumed office 6 June 2021
- Preceded by: Jens Diederichs
- Constituency: Eisleben (2021–2026)

Personal details
- Born: 3 October 1982 (age 44)
- Party: Christian Democratic Union

René Barthel (born 3 October 1982) is a German politician serving as a member of the Landtag of Saxony-Anhalt since 2021. He has served as chairman of the Mittelstands- und Wirtschaftsunion in Mansfeld-Südharz since 2020.
