= Trude Unruh =

German politician (1925–2021)

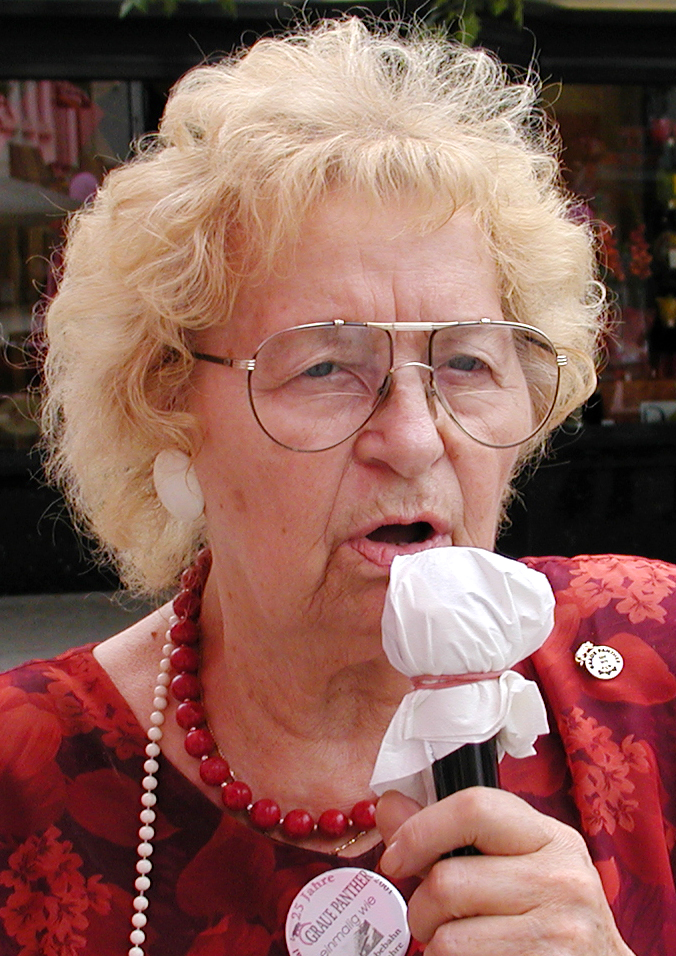
Unruh in 2002

Gertrude Unruh (née Kremer; 7 March 1925 – 30 November 2021), better known as Trude Unruh, was a German politician.

Unruh was born in Essen on 7 March 1925.

From 1968 to 1973 she was a member of the SPD and from 1973 to 1978 of the FDP.

Unruh was elected in the 1987 West German federal election. On 13 September 1989, she was expelled from the Green Caucus.

Unruh died in November 2021, at the age of 96. Her death was not announced until August 2022.
