= Frank Tiesler =

German politician (1938–2021)

State Secretary in the Ministry for Foreign Affairs
- In office 1 May 1990 – 2 October 1990 Serving with Hans-Jürgen Misselwitz, Kersten Radzimanowski, Helmut Domke
- Minister-President: Lothar de Maizière
- Minister: Markus Meckel; Lothar de Maizière
- Preceded by: Position established
- Succeeded by: Position abolished

Member of the Bundestag for Volkskammer
- In office 3 October 1990 – 20 December 1990
- Preceded by: Constituency established
- Succeeded by: Constituency abolished

Member of the Volkskammer for Dresden
- In office 5 April 1990 – 2 October 1990
- Preceded by: Constituency established
- Succeeded by: Constituency abolished

Personal details
- Born: Frank Tiesler; 20 April 1938 Dresden, Free State of Saxony, Nazi Germany
- Died: 24 June 2021 (aged 83) Dresden, Germany
- Party: German Social Union
- Children: 3
- Education: Humboldt University of Berlin (Dr. phil)
- Occupation: Politician; Ethnologist; Forest Surveyor

Frank Tiesler (20 April 1938 – 24 June 2021) was a German ethnologist and politician.

== Life and career ==
After completing school, Tiesler completed an apprenticeship as a mechanic. He was dishonorably discharged from his compulsory military service for calling on his comrades to engage in disobedience. After his discharge, he pursued training as a forestry surveyor.

From 1961 to 1965, Tiesler studied ethnology at the Humboldt University in Berlin, graduating with a diploma in ethnology. In 1974, he obtained his Dr. phil with his dissertation on the settlement history and stylistic provinces in North New Guinea. That same year, he became the head of the scientific department at the Dresden Museum of Ethnology. He served as a curator there until his retirement in 1990.

Tiesler specialized in New Guinea, among other things attempting to structure the islands art geographically.

== Political career ==
=== East Germany ===
During the Wende, Tiesler joined the German Social Union (DSU) and was elected to the Volkskammer for Dresden in the March 1990 general election. From May to October 1990, he served as State Secretary in the Ministry of Foreign Affairs, first led by Markus Meckel.

=== Germany ===
Tiesler was one of 144 Volkskammer co-opted to the Bundestag following German reunification. He remained a member of the Bundestag until the end of the legislative period in December 1990 and was a guest of the CDU/CSU/DSU parliamentary group during his time there.
