= Dietmar Keller =

East German politician (born 1942)

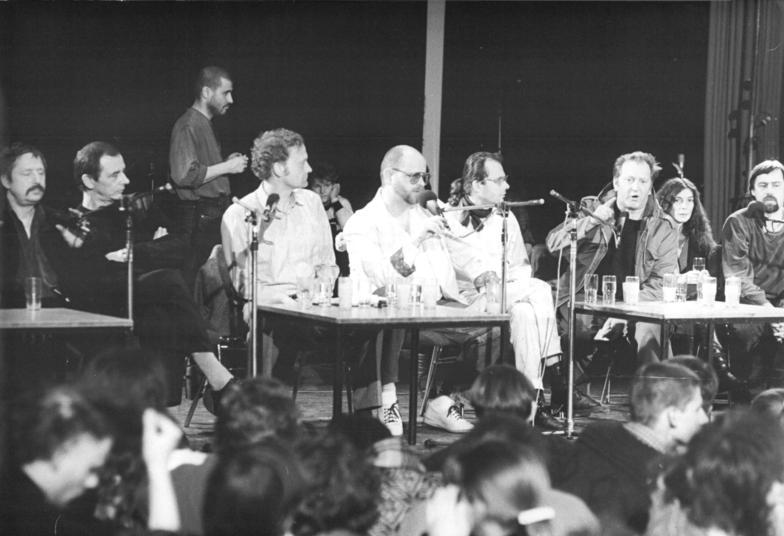
- Keller (2nd from left) in Berlin, 1989
- Born: 17 March 1942 (age 84); Chemnitz, Saxony, Germany
- Education: KMU
- Occupation: Politician
- Political party: SED; PDS
- Spouses: Gisela Oechelhaeuser; Marlies Deneke

Dietmar Keller (born 17 March 1942) was an East German politician (SED/PDS) who served as Minister for Culture in the Modrow government. After reunification he sat as a member of the German parliament ("Bundestag") between 1990 and 1994.

== Life ==
Dietmar Keller was born at the height of the Second World War into a working-class family in Chemnitz, which is also where he grew up. His father was a mechanic. His mother worked in a shop.

Dietmar Keller completed his schooling in 1960 and for the next eighteen months undertook his military service in the National People's Army. Between 1962 and 1966 he studied successfully for a teaching qualification in Marxism–Leninism at the Karl Marx University (as it was known between 1953 and 1991) at Leipzig, with a focus on history and journalism. He joined the ruling Socialist Unity Party ("Sozialistische Einheitspartei Deutschlands" / SED) in 1963, the year of his twenty-first birthday. He stayed on at Leipzig as a research assistant - later a senior research assistant - between 1966 and 1970.

He received his doctorate in 1969. The work for it involved, in his own words, the study of "problems of the development of economic democracy between 1945 and 1952 in the Soviet occupation zone [till October 1949] and the German Democratic Republic [thereafter]. The actual title of his dissertation was "The emergence of socialist democracy in the materials production sector of the publicly owned enterprises from the middle of 1948 till the middle of 1952" ("Die Herausbildung der sozialistischen Demokratie im Bereich der materiellen Produktion der volkseigenen Industrie von Mitte 1948 bis Mitte 1952"). As a very young man Keller's ambition had been to become a sports journalist, and as he progressed his academic career he also supplied reports to the sports section of Freie Presse, a regional daily newspaper based in Chemnitz.

In November 1970 he took over as Secretary for Sciences, Humanities and Arts ("Sekretär für Wissenschaft und Kultur") with the party sectional leadership team ("SED-Kreisleitung") at the Karl Marx University. That lasted till December 1977 when he took over as Party Regional Secretary for Sciences, Humanities, Popular education and Arts ("Sekretär für Wissenschaft und Kultur") in respect of the Leipzig party regional leadership team ("SED-Bezirksleitung"). By this time, seven years after receiving his doctorate, he had received his Habilitation for a piece of work on the postwar history of Leipzig University. Identified as a post-graduate student of significant promise, during 1982/83 he accepted the opportunity to study for a year at the Academy for Social Sciences run in Moscow by the Central Committee of the Soviet Communist Party. His lecturers in Moscow included the reformist historian Roy Medvedev who would emerge after 1991 as a leading proponent of Democratic socialism. Responding to an interviewer's question in 1990 Keller acknowledge that even as far back as 1982/83, when he was studying in Moscow, gentle breezes of what came to be known as Glasnost were already discernible in the Soviet capital, both one or two theatres and in some of the (little noticed by foreign observers) activities of Mikhail Gorbachev at the Agriculture Plenum of the Central Committee's Secretariat for Agriculture.

After returning home, in April 1984 he moved from Leipzig to Berlin when he was appointed a deputy minister at the Culture Ministry. His principal responsibility covered the country's post-school-level colleges and academies. Personal priorities included making the colleges more autonomous in their decision processes, and trying to ensure that admission criteria were based less on social provenance and more on talent. One ambition was "to extend the Marxist-Leninist base education at the colleges and academies with religious history, with arts and cultural history, with ethics, morality and aesthetics" (""das marxistisch-leninistische Grundlagenstudium an den künstlerischen Hoch- und Fachschulen zu ergänzen durch Geistes- und Religionsgeschichte, durch Kunst- und Kulturgeschichte, durch Ethik, Moral und Ästhetik""). Self evidently, he did not succeed. Between 1988 and 1989 Keller served as Secretary of state (high level official) at the Culture Ministry, with special responsibility for museums and national anniversaries. He then took over from Hans-Joachim Hoffmann in November 1989 as Minister for Culture in the new Modrow government. He approached the job with high ambitions, but the changes triggered when protesters breaching the Berlin Wall demonstrated that the fraternal Soviet forces had no orders to suppress street protests by force as they had in 1953. It was a difficult time to be an East German government minister: Dietmar Keller would later characterise his five months in the post as a blend of "brilliance and misery" ("Glanz und Elend eines Ministers").

In March 1990, East Germany underwent its first (and as matters turned out last) free and fair general election. Replaced at the Culture Ministry by Herbert Schirmer, Keller was elected to the East German national parliament ("Volkskammer"), representing the Leipzig electoral district. He served as a member of the parliament's Committees for Germany Unification and was also chair of the parliamentary culture committee.

Reunification took place, formally, in October 1990. On 3 October 144 of the 400 former members of the East German Volkskammer became members of a newly enlarged German Bundestag. Of those 144, 24 were members of the PDS (formerly SED), its dominating position in the Volkskammer having been destroyed by the election results seven months earlier. Dietmar Keller was one of the 24 PDS members who transferred from the Volkskammer to the Bundestag in October 1990. A couple of months later General Election was held in which Dietmar Keller was re-elected, now as a "list member" for the Brandenburg electoral district.

He was elected to the important Bundestag enquiry commission, "Evaluation of the History and Consequences of the East German dictatorship ("Aufarbeitung von Geschichte und Folgen der SED-Diktatur")" which began its work in March 1992. His seat on the commission was contested, and fellow members of the PDS Bundestag group elected him in preferences to Uwe-Jens Heuer. Ahead of the 1994 election he renounced his Bundestag membership, but he continued to work with the party group in the Bundestag "on a consultancy basis". Four months after the election he became a personal political assistant to Gregor Gysi, a role in which he continued for eight years till 2002. In addition to producing research papers and analyses, he became a speech writer for Gysi. In December 1996 he married the manager of Gysi's political office, Marlies Deneke. (His previous wife, Gisela Oechelhaeuser, was shortly afterwards unmasked as a Stasi informer ("IM") during the later 1970s, although the information became public only in 1999.)

In May 2002 the Kellers decided to end their working relationship with Gregor Gysi. Gysi and Keller had always been political allies, members of the "reforming wing" of the PDS (party) even during their time as members of its precursor, the SED (party) during the final years of the German Democratic Republic. By 2002 the reforming wing of the PDS was becoming a lonely place. Gregor Gysi was involved with an "expenses scandal" involving "air miles" and would resign from the Berlin city government in July 1992. Although for many ordinary voters he remained the public face of the PDS, among party comrades he had become increasingly isolated. Dietmar Keller, as Gysi's reforming (and intellectually formidable) political ally, had also found himself attacked with increasing savagery by party comrades over the past couple of years, especially after a critical interview that he gave to Der Spiegel in April 2000. Keller himself had not been a Bundestag member for eight years. His resignation from the party later in 2002 reverberated inside the party, but went largely unremarked otherwise.

His political autobiographical volume, In den Mühlen der Ebene. Unzeitgemäße Erinnerungen (loosely "In the mills of government. Untimely memories") appeared in 2011.
