= Barthel, Saskatchewan =

Locality in Saskatchewan, Canada

Coordinates: 53.904975°N 109.045343°W

Barthel is an unincorporated locality in northern Saskatchewan, Canada.
