= Marlies Deneke =

German politician

- Born: Marlies Kilian; 23 December 1953 (age 72); Magdeburg, Bezirk Magdeburg, East Germany
- Occupation: politician
- Political party: SED (1979-1989); PDS (1989-2002)
- Spouse(s): 1. _____ Deneke; 2. Dietmar Keller
- Children: y

Marlies Deneke (born Marlies Kilian: 23 December 1953) is a German politician (SED / PDS).

She sat as a member of the East German national parliament (Volkskammer) between March and October 1990, and then of the post-reunification Bundestag. During and after the final months of the German Democratic Republic, she was a member of the party leadership team trying to navigate the transformation of the Socialist Unity Party (Sozialistische Einheitspartei Deutschlands/ SED) from a position of dominance in the East German one-party state to its new role as the Party of Democratic Socialism (Partei des Demokratischen Sozialismus / PDS), an alternative left wing grouping operating in the multi-party context of a newly reunified Germany.

== Life ==
Marlies Kilian was born into a working-class family in Magdeburg. She attended secondary school between 1960 and 1970, like most contemporaries becoming a member, in 1967, of the Free German Youth (Freie Deutsche Jugend / FDJ) organisation, which was in effect the youth wing of the ruling SED (party). She joined the Trades Union Federation (Freier Deutscher Gewerkschaftsbund / FDGB) in 1970, undertaking an apprenticeship in merchandising between 1970 and 1972. She then took a job locally with the East German Trade Organisation (Handelsorganisation) which was concerned with the provision of daily necessities in Magdeburg. She was promoted to the position of "Deputy Operations Director" ("stellvertretende Betriebsdirektorin") in 1977. In 1979, she became a member of the ruling SED.

In 1980, she embarked on a distance learning degree course with the Dresden Academy for Economics, which led in 1985 to a qualification in economics. Between 1982 and 1988, she served as chair of the Trades Union leadership, and from 1988 till 1989 as SED Party Secretary within the "Handelsorganisation" in Magdeburg where she worked.

On 9 December 1989, Marlies Deneke was elected to the executive committee and the presidium of the newly launched Party of Democratic Socialism. Between January and March 1990, she participated in the Round Table forum in Berlin. In June 1990, Deneke and André Brie were elected as the deputy chairpersons of the PDS.

The first (and, as matters turned out, last) democratically configured general election in the German Democratic Republic took place on 18 March 1990. The PDS won only 66 of the 400 seats in the new "Volkskammer", but Deneke's name was nevertheless high enough up on the party list to ensure her inclusion. She was also one of the 24 PDS members who transferred across to the new Bundestag in October 1990 under the terms of the unification treaty concluded the previous month. However, she was no longer a member after the election in December 1990. She was re-elected to the PDS deputy chairmanship in January 1991 retaining both the position and a high party profile till December 1991.

Marlies Deneke continued to undertake support work for the PDS group in the Bundestag for some time, but she resigned from the party in 2002.
