= Lieselotte Berger =

German politician (1920–1989)

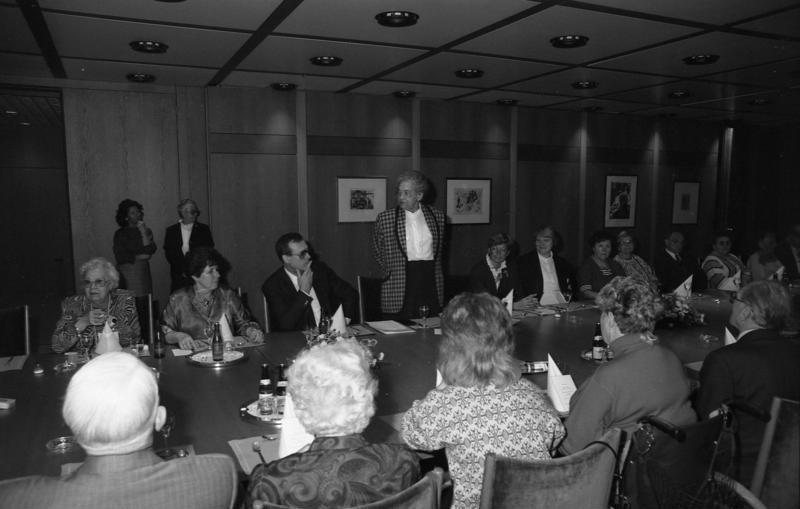
- Lieselotte Berger (centre, standing) at a reception

Member of the Bundestag
- In office 26 August 1971 – 26 September 1989

Personal details
- Born: 13 November 1920 Berlin
- Died: 26 September 1989 (aged 68) Berlin, Germany
- Party: CDU

Lieselotte Berger (November 13, 1920 – September 26, 1989) was a German politician of the Christian Democratic Union (CDU) and former member of the German Bundestag.

== Life ==
Since 1958, she was a member of the CDU. From 1965, she was a member of the CDU state executive committee in Berlin and from 1973 deputy CDU state chairwoman in Berlin.

On 26 August 1971, when she succeeded Karl-Heinz Schmitz, she joined the German Bundestag as a Berlin member. She was then a member of the German Bundestag until her death. Here she was chairman of the Petitions Committee from 1972 to 1987.

After the 1987 federal elections, she became Parliamentary State Secretary to the Federal Chancellor and Plenipotentiary of the Federal Government in Berlin on 12 March 1987. She held this office until her death.

== Literature ==
Herbst, Ludolf; Jahn, Bruno (2002). Vierhaus, Rudolf (ed.). Biographisches Handbuch der Mitglieder des Deutschen Bundestages. 1949–2002 [Biographical Handbook of the Members of the German Bundestag. 1949–2002] (in German). München: De Gruyter - De Gruyter Saur. p. 1715. ISBN 978-3-11-184511-1.
