= Skowrony, Warmian-Masurian Voivodeship =

Skowrony
- Village
- Location within Poland
- Coordinates: 54°4′N 19°54′E
- Country: Poland
- Voivodeship: Warmian-Masurian
- County: Elbląg
- Gmina: Godkowo
- Population (2021): 188

Skowrony [skɔˈvrɔnɨ] is a village in the administrative district of Gmina Godkowo, within Elbląg County, Warmian-Masurian Voivodeship, in northern Poland.
