= Konrad Porzner =

German politician (1935–2021)

Member of the Bundestag
- In office 29 March 1983 – 2 October 1990
- In office 21 May 1962 – 28 January 1981

Personal details
- Born: 4 February 1935 Larrieden, Bavaria, Germany
- Died: 1 December 2021 (aged 86) Roth, Bavaria, Germany
- Party: SPD

Konrad Porzner (4 February 1935 – 1 December 2021) was a German politician. A member of the Social Democratic Party of Germany, he served in the Bundestag from 1962 to 1981 and again from 1983 to 1990.
