= Nils Diederich =

German politician (SPD) and political scientist

Nils Diederich (born 6 May 1934) is a German Social Democratic Party politician and political scientist. He served as a member of the German Bundestag from 1976 to 1987 and 1989 to 1994. He is professor emeritus for political science, focusing on political sociology, at the Free University of Berlin. He has a diplom in economics and joined the SPD in 1952. In the Bundestag, he was a member of the finance and budget committees. Diederich is the grandfather of musical artist Ski Aggu.
