= Werner Weiß =

Member of the Landtag of Rhineland-Palatinate
- In office 1971–1980

German Parliament
- In office 1980–1990

Personal details
- Born: 19 October 1926 Zweibrücken, Germany
- Died: 6 February 1990 (aged 63) Koblenz, Germany
- Party: Christian Democratic Union of Germany

Werner Weiß (19 October 1926 – 6 February 1990) was a German politician (CDU).

He was a member of the German Parliament from 1980 until his death. Weiß had previously been a member of the Landtag of Rhineland-Palatinate from 1971 to 1980.

== Biography ==
Weiß was born in Zweibrücken. In 1943, he was conscripted into the Reichsarbeitsdienst and subsequently into the mountain infantry of the Wehrmacht. After his release from American war captivity in December 1945, Weiß started working as a teacher and joined the CDU in 1949. Weiß moved to Otterbach and served in its community council from 1956 until his death. He became a member of the district council of Kaiserslautern in 1964 and served as party leader of the CDU from 1969 onwards.

During his tenure in the German Parliament, Weiß was a member of the NATO Parliamentary Assembly and served as president of the German-Iranian Society in Bonn. He was awarded the German Cross of the Order of Merit (Bundesverdienstkreuz am Bande).

== Bibliography ==
- Holzapfel, Klaus-Jürgen (editor) (1988): Kürschners Volkshandbuch Deutscher Bundestag. 11. Wahlperiode 1987, 53rd edition, version of 1 April 1988, ISBN 978-3-87576-209-9
