= Lothar Barthel =

German politician (1937–2020)

Member of the Bundestag
- In office 3 October 1990 – 20 December 1990

Personal details
- Born: 28 June 1937 Kirchworbis, Germany
- Died: 20 July 2020 (aged 83)
- Party: CDU
- Occupation: Lawyer

Lothar Barthel (28 June 1937 – 20 July 2020) was a German politician of the Christian Democratic Union (CDU) and member of the German Bundestag.

== Life and career ==
Barthel had been a member of the CDU in the GDR since 1977 and was a member of the CDU district executive Gera and the CDU party executive before 1989.

In March 1990, Barthel was elected to the Volkskammer in the Gera constituency on behalf of the CDU. In October 1990, he was one of the 144 members of parliament sent to the Bundestag by the Volkskammer. He was a member of the Bundestag until December 1990.

Barthel died on 20 July 2020, at the age of 83.

== Literature ==
Herbst, Ludolf; Jahn, Bruno (2002). Vierhaus, Rudolf (ed.). Biographisches Handbuch der Mitglieder des Deutschen Bundestages. 1949–2002 [Biographical Handbook of the Members of the German Bundestag. 1949–2002] (in German). München: De Gruyter - De Gruyter Saur. p. 1715. ISBN 978-3-11-184511-1.
