= Dieter Wiefelspütz =

German politician and lawyer

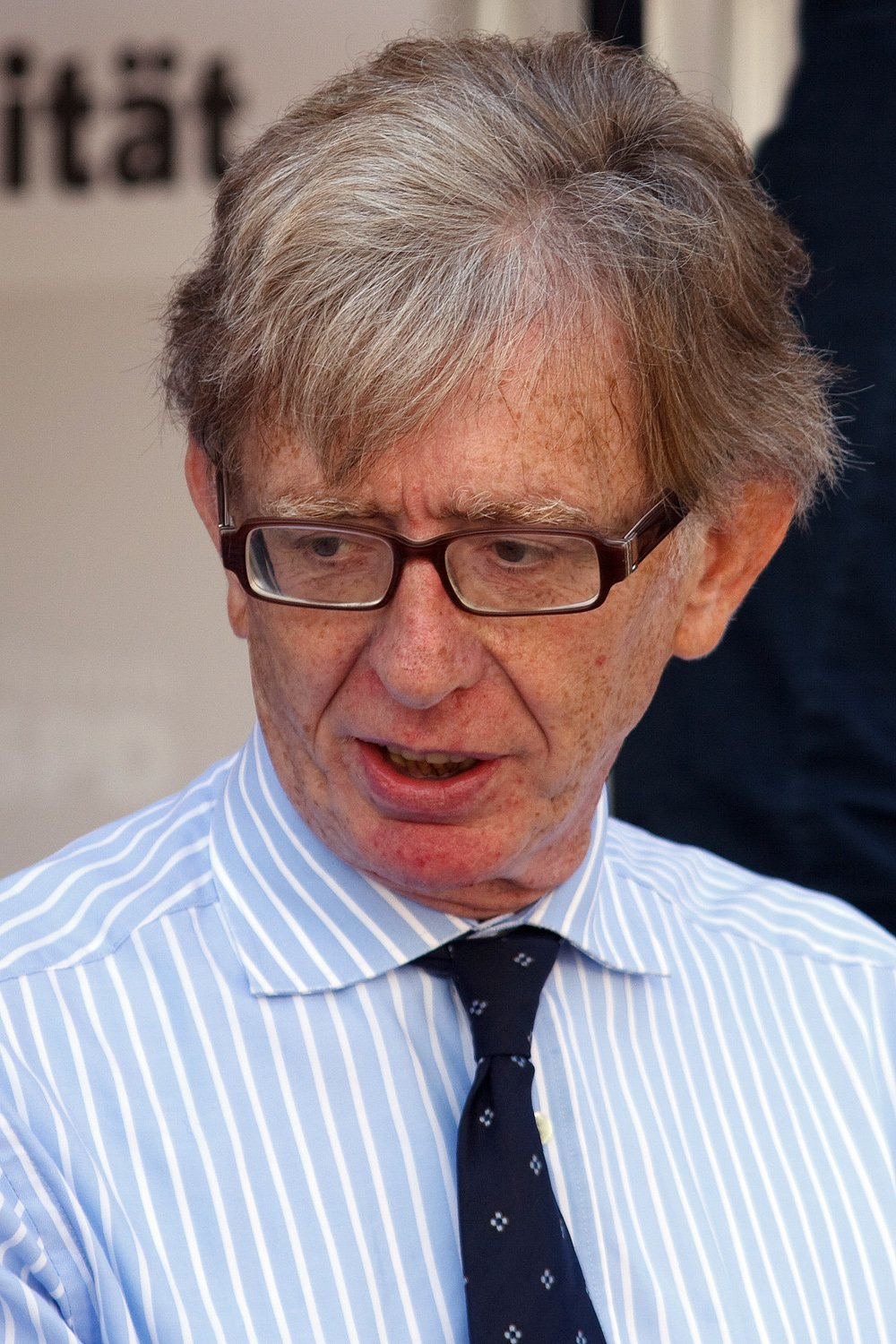
Dieter Wiefelspütz, 2009

Dieter Wiefelspütz (born 22 September 1946) is a German politician (SPD) who has been a member of the Bundestag, the German parliament from 1987 to 2013. He has been speaker for domestic politics of the SPD parliamentary group from 1998 to 19 October 2011. From 1990 to 1998 he had been chairman of the Bundestag Committee for Scrutiny, Immunity and Standing Orders.

Wiefelspütz was born in Lünen, studied law at Ruhr-Universität Bochum and has been a member of his party since 1972.
