= Federal ministry (Germany) =

German federal organisation

Federal Ministry (diagram)

In Germany, a Federal ministry (Bundesministerium) is a supreme federal agency subordinate to a federal minister at the federal level. According to Article 62 of the Basic Law, the Federal Government consists of the Federal Chancellor and the federal ministers. Within the Chancellor's power to issue directives, each federal minister manages their ministry independently (also known as departmental authority). This includes, in addition to the ministry itself, the upper, middle, and lower federal authorities assigned to that department.

The civil servants (Beamter) and public employees (Arbeitnehmer im öffentlichen Dienst) of the Federal Ministry perform the duties of the Federal Minister on his behalf and in his name, in particular the professional and administrative supervision of subordinate authorities and the political duties vis-à-vis the German Bundestag and other federal bodies. The Ministry stands at the interface between political leadership (Gubernative) and the apolitical administration (Executive in the narrower sense). The activities of the ministerial administration therefore differ from those of subordinate administrations.

== History ==
Following Prussian tradition, administrative acts of the federal ministries are issued in the first person and refer to the federal minister.

The various ministries have become increasingly differentiated throughout history. This is evident in the history of concepts, for example, in the establishment of the Prussian State Ministry, which encompassed the entire government. The classically recognised ministries emerged in the 19th century: Finance, Foreign Affairs, War, the Interior, and Justice.

The North German Confederation, and later the German Empire, did not use the term ministerial or "Ministerium". The Chancellor of Germany had become the (sole) responsible federal minister through the Lex Bennigsen of 1867. The Federal Chancellery of the North German Confederation was initially the only supreme federal authority until 1870, when the Prussian Foreign Ministry became the Foreign Office of the North German Confederation. The Prussian Foreign Ministry, established in 1870, had already been renamed the Foreign Office of the North German Confederation upon its incorporation and continued to exist as such in the German Empire. The highest imperial authorities in the Empire from 1871 onward were called Imperial Offices (Reichsamt). Their heads, the State Secretaries, received instructions from the Chancellor and were therefore not fellow ministers. Full-fledged imperial ministries, known as Reichsministers, were only introduced with the Weimar Republic. The Imperial Justice Office, established after the founding of the German Empire (1877), was not called a ministry. This was because the Imperial Chancellery (at the beginning of the German Empire under the leadership of Otto von Bismarck) held all imperial authority, and differentiation at the imperial level only occurred later. To avoid any accountability of the imperial government to parliament, there were formally no ministers or ministries, and thus no collegial imperial government, although the state secretaries, as heads of the imperial offices, actually held a position very similar to that of ministers.

The Basic Law does not prescribe the number or structure of the federal ministries. The Federal Chancellor is therefore free, within the scope of his organizational authority , to establish or dissolve ministries. Only the Federal Ministers of Defence (Art. 65a), Justice (Art. 96 para. 2 sentence 4), and Finance (Art. 112 sentence 1 and Art. 114 para. 4) are explicitly mentioned in the Basic Law. The status of these ministries as such may therefore not be altered. In everyday political discourse, in addition to the three mentioned above, the Foreign Office and the Interior Ministry are also referred to as "classic" ministries. For reasons of tradition, these still use the definite article before the name of the department ("genitive ministry", with the exception of the Foreign Office, while the others are named according to the pattern "Federal Ministry for …".

Since May 6, 2025, there have been 17 ministries in the Merz cabinet.

== Current Federal Ministries ==
English name	German name	Abbreviation	Authority management	Founding	First official residence	Second official residence
Federal Ministry of Finance	Bundesministerium der Finanzen	BMF	Lars Klingbeil (SPD)	1949	Wilhelmstraße 97 10117 Berlin	Am Propsthof 78a 53121 Bonn
Federal Ministry of the Interior	Bundesministerium des Innern	BMI	Alexander Dobrindt (CSU)	1949	Alt-Moabit 140 10559 Berlin	Graurheindorfer Straße 198 53117 Bonn
Federal Foreign Office	Auswärtiges Amt	AA	Johann Wadephul (CDU)	1951	Werderscher Markt 1 10117 Berlin	Adenauerallee 99–103 53113 Bonn
Federal Ministry of Defence	Bundesministerium der Verteidigung	BMVg	Boris Pistorius (SPD)	1955	Fontainengraben 150 53123 Bonn	Stauffenbergstraße 18 10785 Berlin
Federal Ministry for Economic Affairs and Energy	Bundesministerium für Wirtschaft und Energie	BMWE	Katherina Reiche (CDU)	1949	Scharnhorststraße 34–37 10115 Berlin	Villemombler Straße 76 53123 Bonn,
Federal Ministry of Research, Technology and Space	Bundesministerium für Forschung, Technologie und Raumfahrt	BMFTR	Dorothee Bär (CSU)	1955	Heinemannstraße 2 53175 Bonn	Kapelle-Ufer 1 10117 Berlin
Federal Ministry of Justice and Consumer Protection	Bundesministerium der Justiz und für Verbraucherschutz	BMJV	Stefanie Hubig (SPD)	1949	Anton-Wilhelm-Amo-Straße 37 10117 Berlin	Adenauerallee 99–103 53113 Bonn
Federal Ministry for Education, Family Affairs, Senior Citizens, Women and Youth	Bundesministerium für Bildung, Familie, Senioren, Frauen und Jugend	BMBFSFJ	Karin Prien (CDU)	1994	Glinkastraße 24 10117 Berlin	Rochusstraße 8–10 53123 Bonn
Federal Ministry of Labour and Social Affairs	Bundesministerium für Arbeit und Soziales	BMAS	Bärbel Bas (SPD)	1949, 2005	Wilhelmstraße 49 10117 Berlin	Rochusstraße 1 53123 Bonn
Federal Ministry for Digital Transformation and Government Modernisation	Bundesministerium für Digitales und Staatsmodernisierung	BMDS	Karsten Wildberger (CDU)	2025	Friedrichstraße 108 10117 Berlin	
Federal Ministry for Transport	Bundesministerium für Verkehr	BMV	Patrick Schnieder (CDU)	1949	Invalidenstraße 44 10115 Berlin	Robert-Schuman-Platz 1 53175 Bonn
Federal Ministry for the Environment, Climate Action, Nature Conservation and Nuclear Safety	Bundesministerium für Umwelt, Klimaschutz, Naturschutz und nukleare Sicherheit	BMUKN	Carsten Schneider (SPD)	1986	Robert-Schuman-Platz 3 53175 Bonn	Stresemannstraße 128–130 10117 Berlin
Federal Ministry of Health (Germany)	Bundesministerium für Gesundheit	BMG	Nina Warken (CDU)	1961	Rochusstraße 1 53123 Bonn	Mauerstraße 29 10117 Berlin
Federal Ministry of Agriculture, Food and Regional Identity	Bundesministerium für Landwirtschaft, Ernährung und Heimat	BMLEH	Alois Rainer (CSU)	1949	Rochusstraße 1 53123 Bonn	Wilhelmstraße 54 10117 Berlin
Federal Ministry for Economic Cooperation and Development	Bundesministerium für wirtschaftliche Zusammenarbeit und Entwicklung	BMZ	Reem Alabali Radovan (SPD)	1961	Dahlmannstraße 4 53113 Bonn	Stresemannstraße 94 10963 Berlin
Federal Ministry for Housing, Urban Development and Building	Bundesministerium für Wohnen, Stadtentwicklung und Bauwesen	BMWSB	Verena Hubertz (SPD)	1949, 2021	Krausenstraße 17–18 10117 Berlin	Graurheindorfer Straße 198 53117 Bonn

== Former ministries ==
Federal Ministry (last name)	Founding	Abolition	Successor authorities
Federal Ministry for Affairs of the Federal Council and the Länder	1949	1969	Bundeskanzleramt
Federal Ministry for the Affairs of the Federal Defense Council	1964	1966	Bundeskanzleramt
Bundesministerium für Forschung und Technologie	1972	1994	Combined with the Bundesministerium für Bildung und Wissenschaft to form the Bundesministerium für Bildung, Wissenschaft, Forschung und Technologie
Bundesministerium für Frauen und Jugend	1991	1994	Combined with the Bundesministerium für Familie und Senioren to form the Bundesministerium für Familie, Senioren, Frauen und Jugend
Bundesministerium für innerdeutsche Beziehungen	1949	1991	Bundesministerium für Familie und Senioren; Bundesministerium des Innern
Bundesministerium für Post und Telekommunikation	1949	1997	Bundesministerium der Finanzen; Bundesministerium für Wirtschaft
Bundesschatzministerium	1949	1969	Bundesministerium der Finanzen; Bundesministerium für Wirtschaft
Bundesministerium für Vertriebene, Flüchtlinge und Kriegsgeschädigte	1949	1969	Integrated into the Bundesministerium des Innern

== Positions in federal ministries ==
The Federal Chancellor and the Federal Ministers hold public office in accordance with the Federal Ministers Act (BMinG), while the Parliamentary State Secretaries and State Ministers hold public office in accordance with the Act on the Legal Status of Parliamentary State Secretaries (ParlStG). All other offices are filled by federal civil servants who hold civil service positions in accordance with the Federal Civil Service Act (BBG).

Official titles in the German federal ministries
Official title	Abbreviation	Salary group
Elected representatives (political offices)
Bundeskanzler	BK	1,66-faches von B 11
Bundesminister	BM	1,33-faches von B 11
Parlamentarischer Staatssekretär or Staatsminister	PSt, PSts, Stm	0,75-faches des Ministergehaltes (entspricht B 11)
Höherer Dienst (university degree or Master's degree)
Staatssekretär	StS, Sts	B 11
Ministerialdirektor	MinDir, MD, MDir	B 10 (stellvertretender Sprecher der Bundesregierung bzw. stellvertretender Leiter des Bundespresseamtes), B 9 (Abteilungsleiter)
Ministerialdirigent	MinDirig, MDirig, MDgt, MDg	B 6 (Head of Department or Deputy Head of Department)
Ministerialrat	MinR, MR	B 3
Ministerialrat, Leitender Regierungsdirektor	MinR, MR, LRD	A 16
Regierungsdirektor	RDir, RD	A 15
Oberregierungsrat	ORR	A 14
Regierungsrat	RR	A 13h (Eingangsamt)
Gehobener Dienst (Fachhochschulstudium or Bachelor)
Oberamtsrat	OAR	A 13g
Amtsrat	AR	A 12
Regierungsamtmann	RAmtm, RAmtfr	A 11
Regierungsoberinspektor	ROI	A 10
Regierungsinspektor	RI	A 9g (Eingangsamt)
Mittlerer Dienst (at least three years of Berufsausbildung)
Amtsinspektor	AI	A 9m
Regierungshauptsekretär	RHS	A 8
Regierungsobersekretär	ROS	A 7
Regierungssekretär	RS	A 6m (Eingangsamt)
Einfacher Dienst (skilled and unskilled)
Oberamtsmeister	OAM	A 5 oder A 6e (herausgehobene Dienstposten)
Amtsmeister	AM	A 4
Hauptamtsgehilfe	HAG	A 3 (Eingangsamt)
~~Oberamtsgehilfe~~	~~OAG~~	~~A 2 (Eingangsamt)~~ (deleted)

=== Notes ===
- Bei weiblichen Beamten werden sämtliche Abkürzungen von Amtsbezeichnungen in der Regel um den Zusatz „in“ oder „’in“ (mit Apostroph) ergänzt (z. B. ORR’in).
- Abweichend vom im nichttechnischen Verwaltungsdienst üblicherweise verwendeten Zusatz „Regierungs-“ wird in Bundesministerien (oberste Bundesbehörden) der Zusatz „Regierungs-“ in den Besoldungsgruppen A 9 (Amtsinspektor statt Regierungsamtsinspektor) und A 12 (Amtsrat statt Regierungsamtsrat) nicht verwendet. Im nachgeordneten Geschäftsbereich von Bundesbehörden (obere, mittlere und untere Bundesbehörden) ist bei diesen Amtsbezeichnungen der Zusatz „Regierungs-“ üblich.
- Das ehemalige Eingangsamt des einfachen Dienstes (Oberamtsgehilfe, A 2) ist weggefallen. Seither ist das Eingangsamt die Besoldungsgruppe A 3 (Hauptamtsgehilfe).
- Ausschließlich beim Auswärtigen Amt (AA) werden die folgenden regulären Amtsbezeichnungen durch eigenständige ersetzt:

Employees (salaried staff) within the meaning of the Collective Agreement for the Public Service (TVöD) are not civil servants and therefore do not have a public-law service and loyalty relationship, but rather a private-law employment relationship. Civil servants are not salaried employees, but are appointed by official document. For salaried employees, the employer is legally referred to as the employer, while for civil servants, the employer is referred to as the superior authority . Only civil servants always hold an official title in accordance with the Federal Salary Scale (see Annex I to Section 20 Paragraph 2 Sentence 1 BBesG). Salaried employees do not hold official titles, but are formally referred to as salaried employees and do not receive a salary, but rather remuneration (salary) in accordance with the TVöD (pay grades E 1 to E 16, comparable to the salary grades of civil servants). However, salaried employees and civil servants have a functional title (e.g., consultant, caseworker, etc.). Civil servants receive their salaries monthly in advance and are not paid for their assigned duties, but rather for their official position (more precisely, their pay grade). Salaried employees receive their pay at the end of the month in which they worked. For both civil servants and salaried employees in federal agencies, the payday is always the last banking day of the month. If a salaried employee applies for civil servant status, the employer and the company physician must verify the relevant requirements (see merit-based selection); if the application is successful, a change of status is effected. Upon this change of status, the employee receives their salary for the previous month on the last day of the month and their salary for the following month in advance at the same time. The professions typically held by salaried employees and, in some cases, civil servants, include primarily administrative specialist, office communication specialist (both geared towards the public service) and office management clerk (geared towards the private sector and at the same time towards the public service)

Civil servant state secretaries and ministerial directors are so-called political appointees; they can be placed on temporary leave at any time in accordance with Section 23 of the Civil Servant Status Act (BeamtStG) and Section 36 Paragraph 1 No. 1 of the Federal Civil Service Act (BBG). Parliamentary state secretaries can be dismissed at any time in accordance with Section 4 Sentence 1, First Half-Sentence of the Parliamentary State Secretaries Act (ParlStG) .

In addition, there are other offices with special status, for example, in connection with a supervisory function. The Federal Commissioner for Data Protection and Freedom of Information, for instance, holds a public-law office with the Federal Government (§ 12 para. 1 BDSG) and was located within the portfolio of the Federal Ministry of the Interior until 2016, and was subject to its supervision (§ 22 para. 5 sentences 1 and 2 BDSG). Parallel to the administrative organizational status of his agency as an outsourced department, the Federal Commissioner for Data Protection and Freedom of Information, as head of this agency, received official remuneration equivalent to that of a federal civil servant in pay grade B 9 (§ 23 para. 7 sentence 1 BDSG).

The Federal Foreign Office sometimes uses service and official titles that differ from those described above . For example, a government councilor (official title) is called a legation secretary. Furthermore, a Foreign Office official posted abroad may, in accordance with international custom and agreements, hold an additional title or other official designation, depending on their duties at the diplomatic mission and international practice: Consul, Embassy Counselor, Embassy Secretary, Chancellor.

In addition to civil servants and employees, external staff have been working in German federal ministries for several years. These are not traditional freelancers financed by the ministries, but rather individuals from the private sector, associations, and interest groups who remain employees of their original employer and are paid by them. This occurs partly within the framework of a personnel exchange program established in 2004, and partly in the form of secondments, which are referred to in federal government publications as "external staff," "secondment," and "deployment." Observers see this as a new dimension of lobbying, even bordering on the "sphere of corruption" (Hans Herbert von Arnim).

== Gallery ==
Federal Ministries at the Bonn office

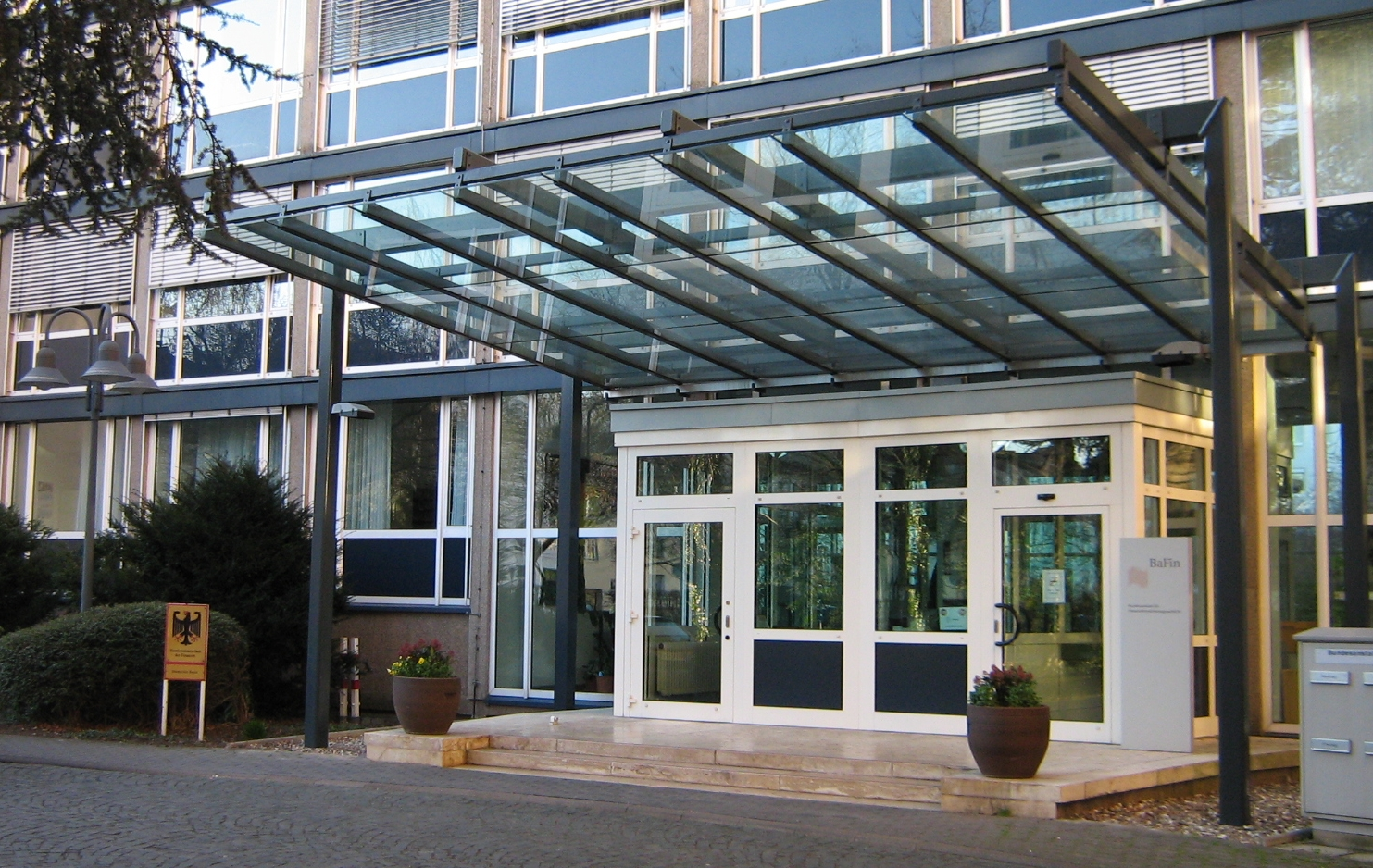
Bundesministerium der Finanzen

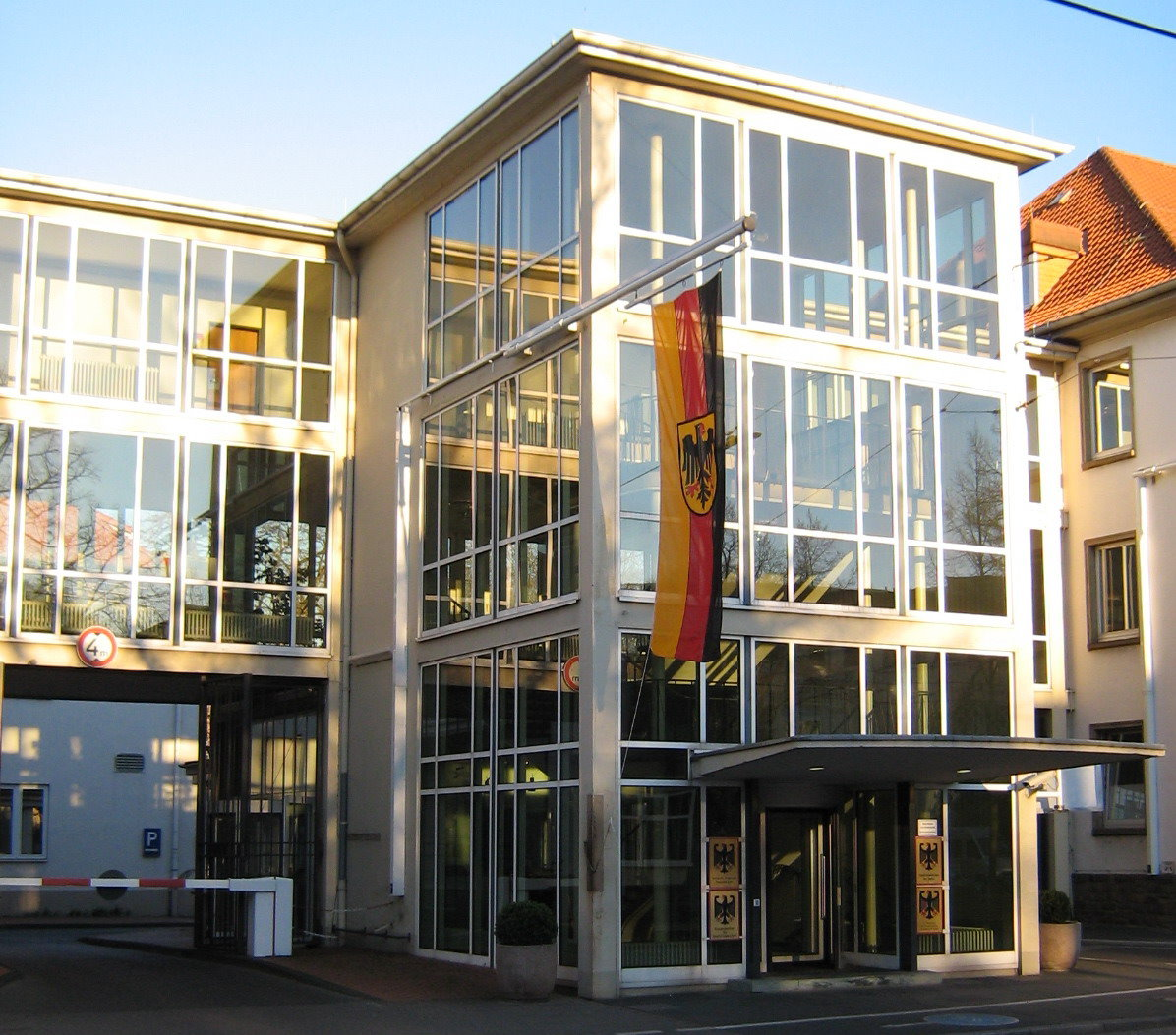
Bundesministerium des Innern

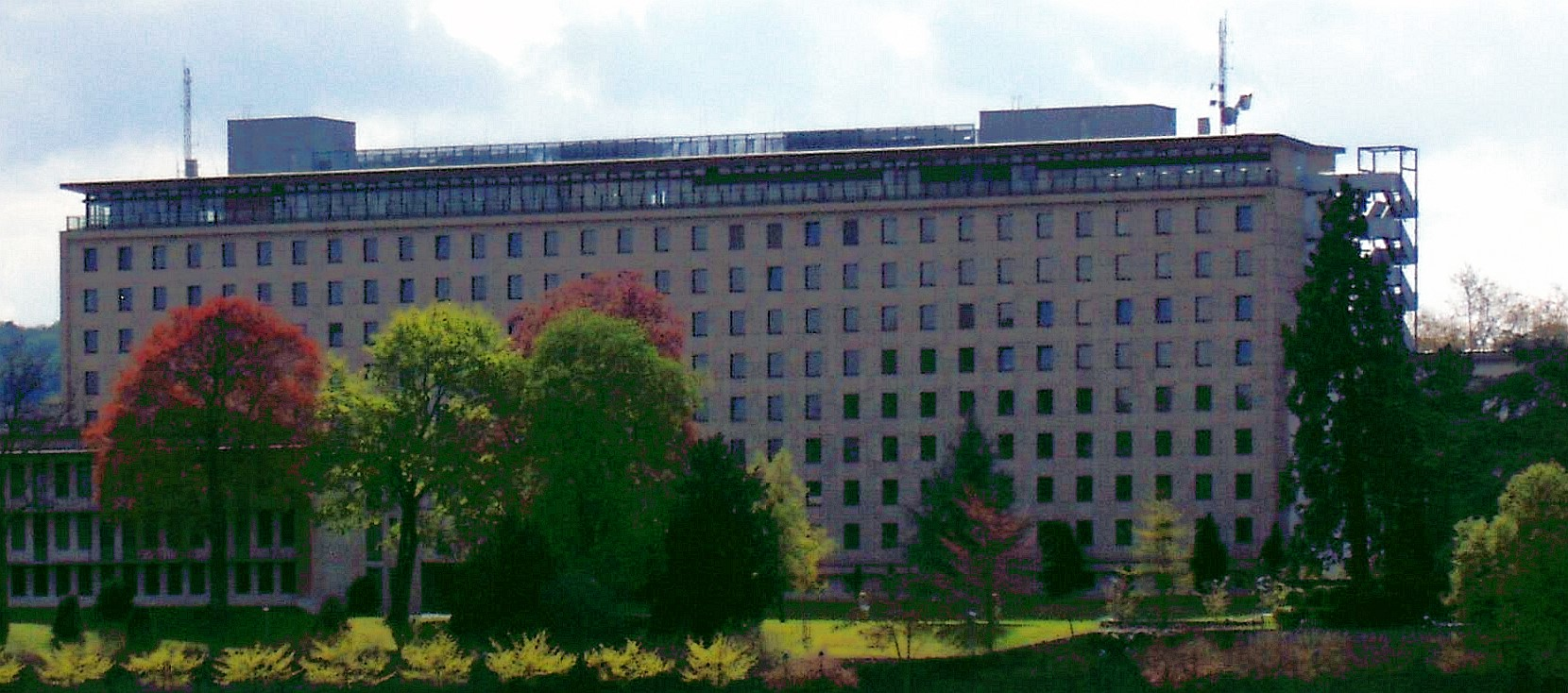
Auswärtiges Amt

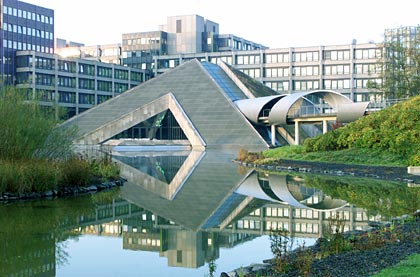
Bundesministerium der Verteidigung

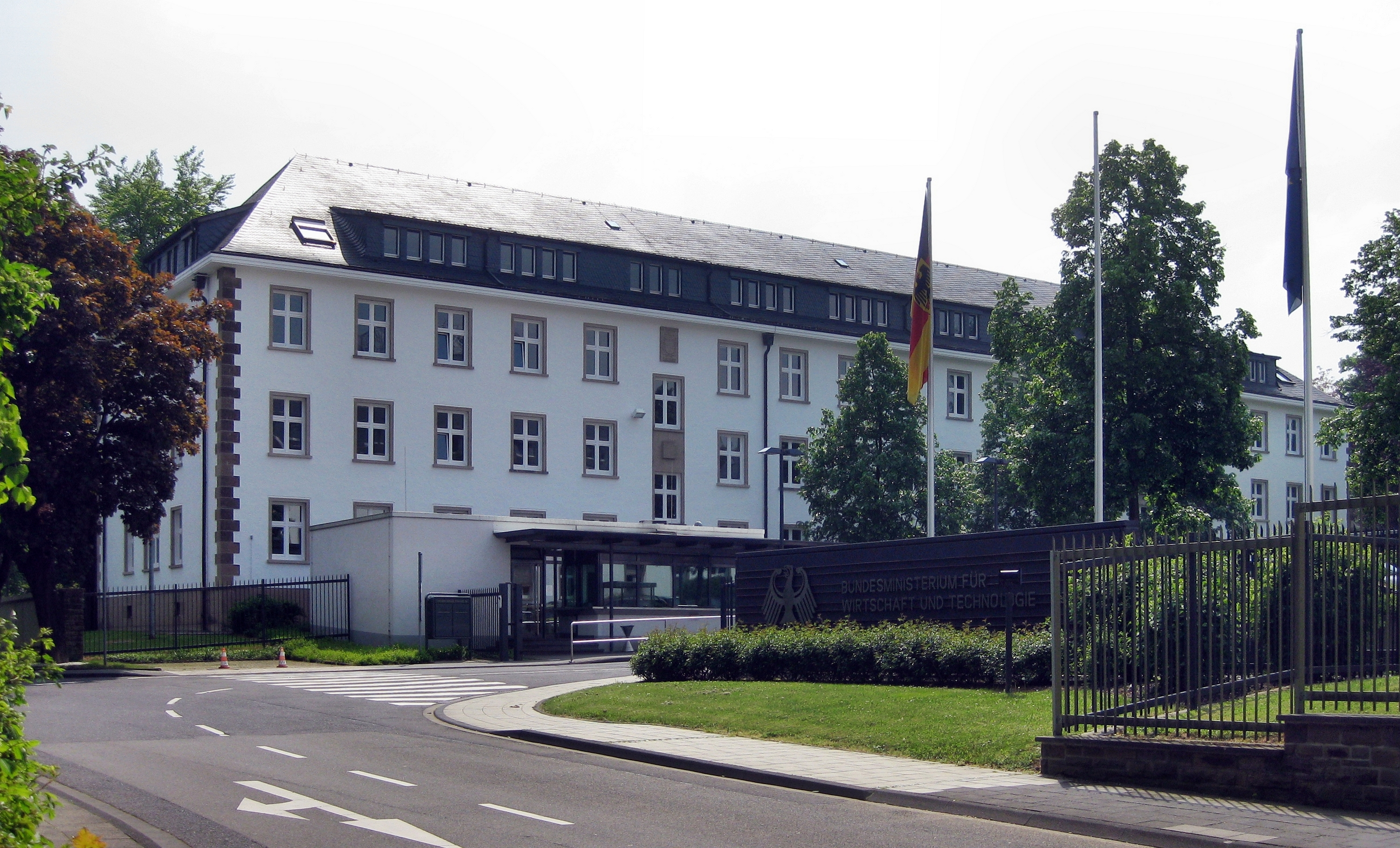
Bundesministerium für Wirtschaft und Energie

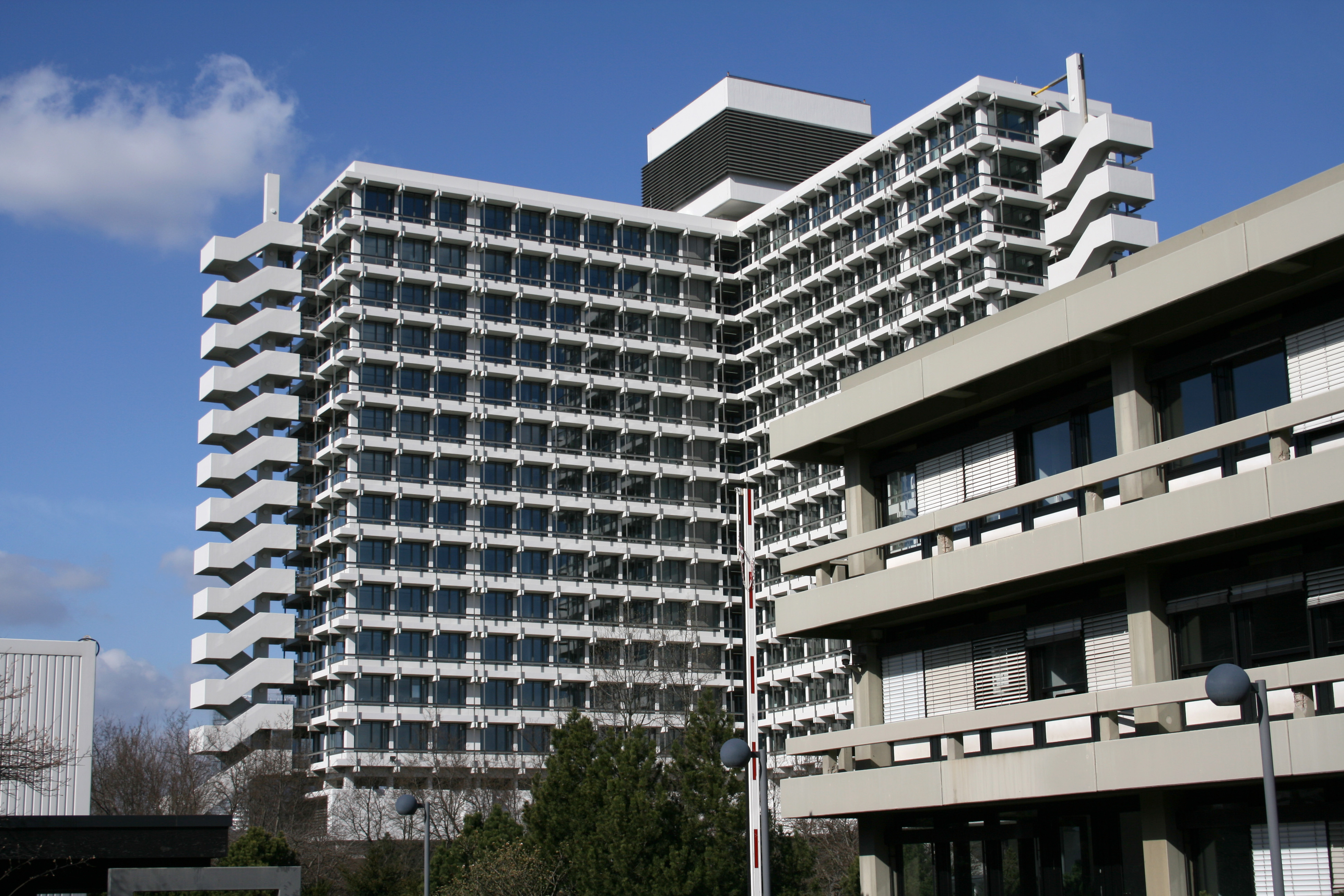
Bundesministerium für Forschung, Technologie und Raumfahrt

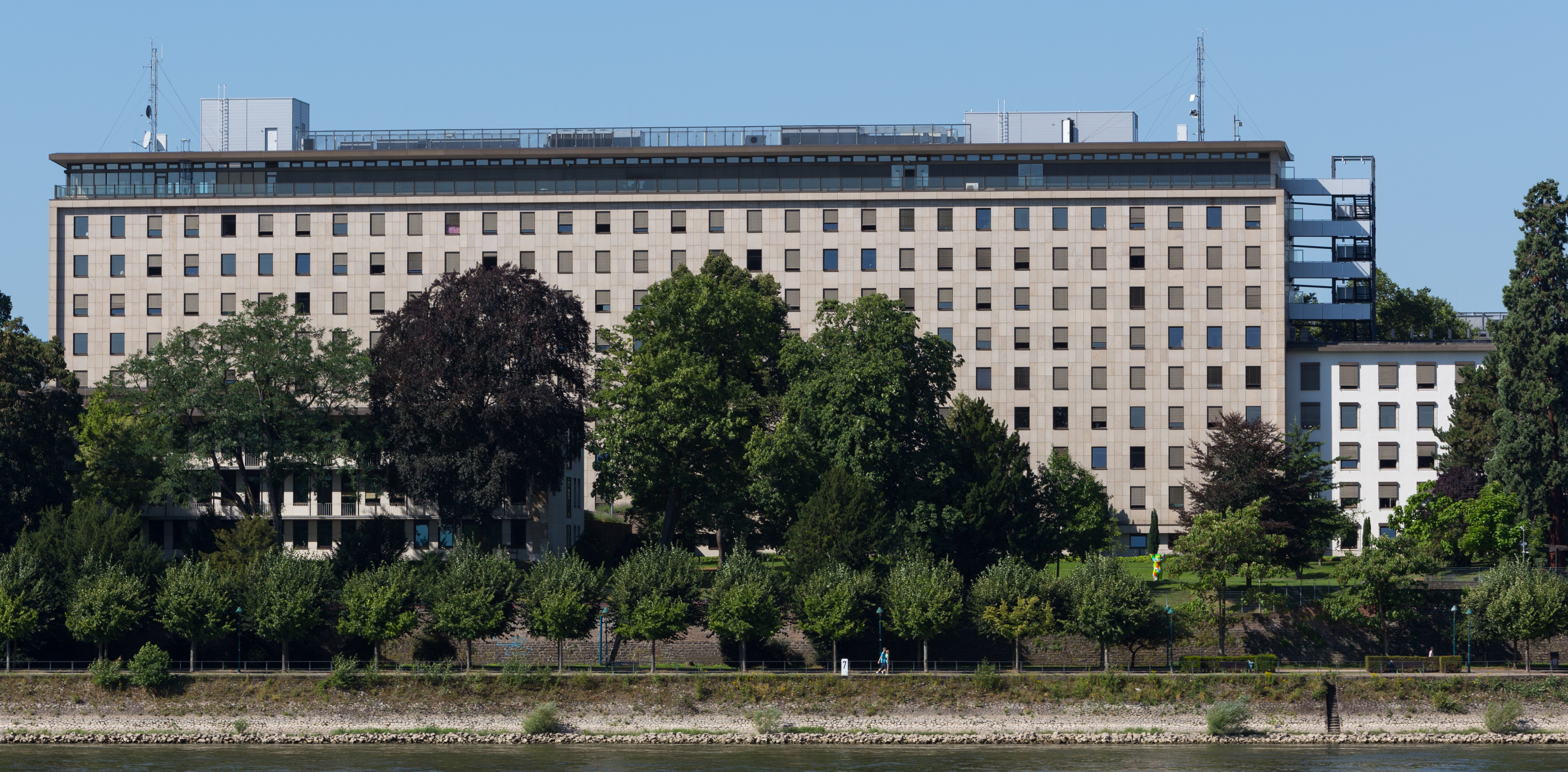
Bundesministerium der Justiz und für Verbraucherschutz

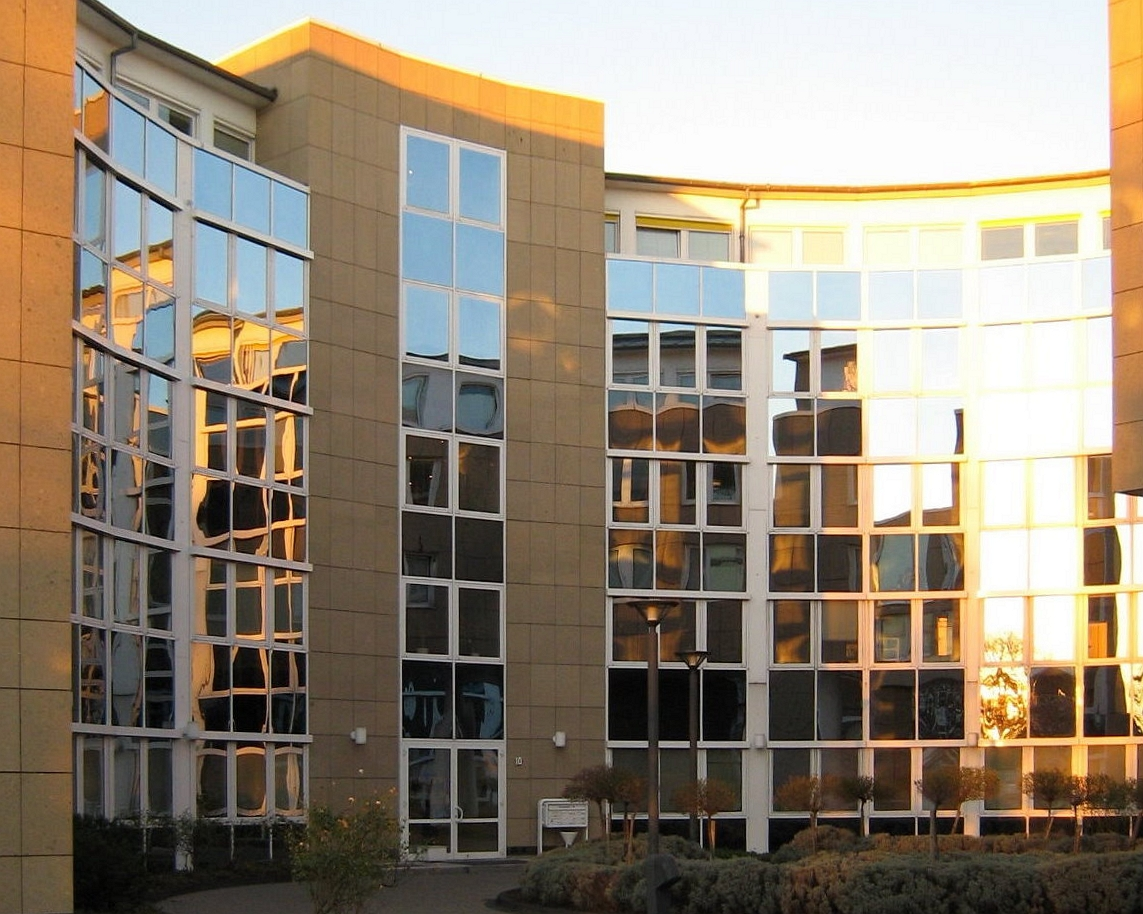
Bundesministerium für Bildung, Familie, Senioren, Frauen und Jugend

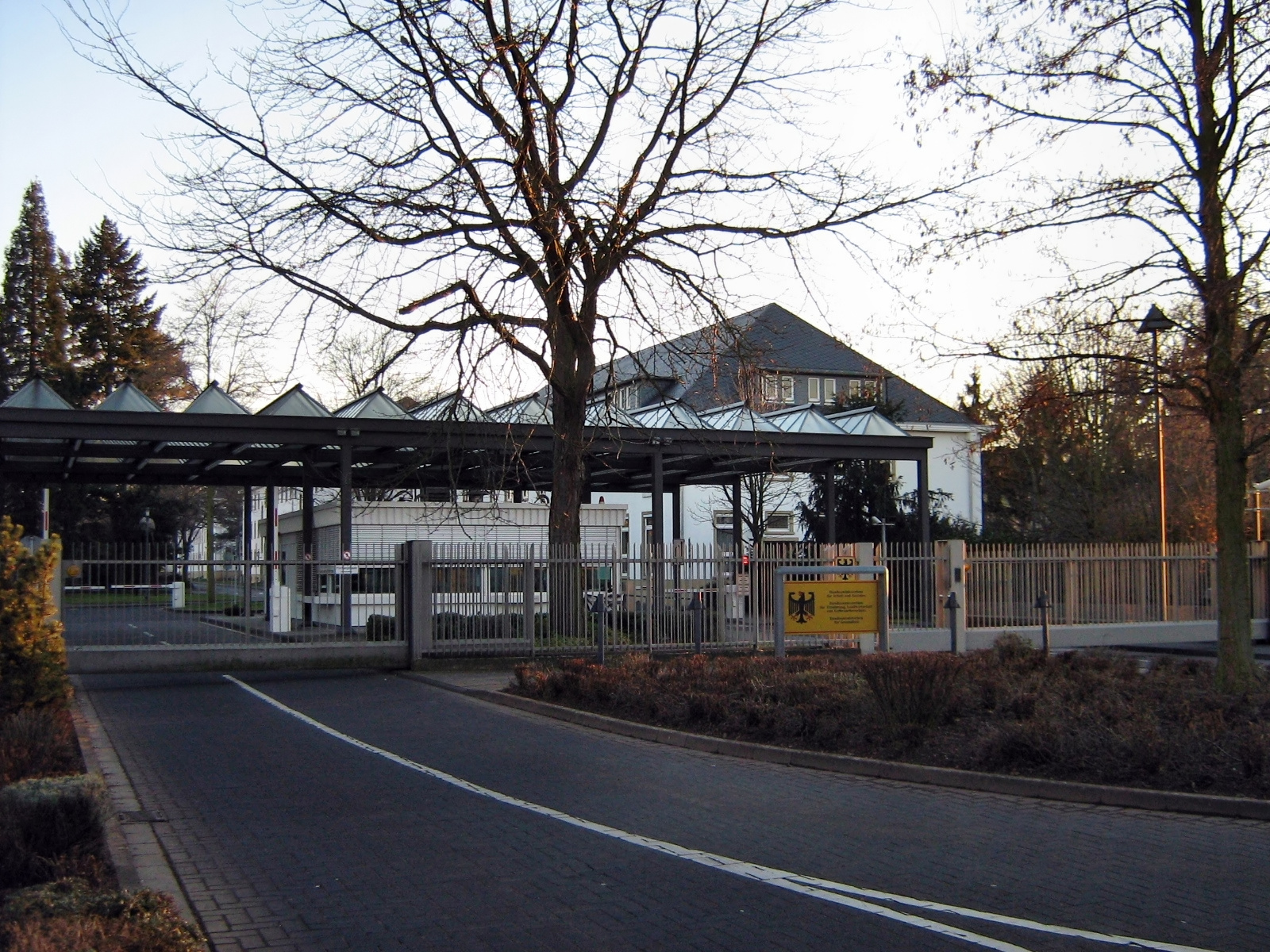
Bundesministerium für Arbeit und Soziales

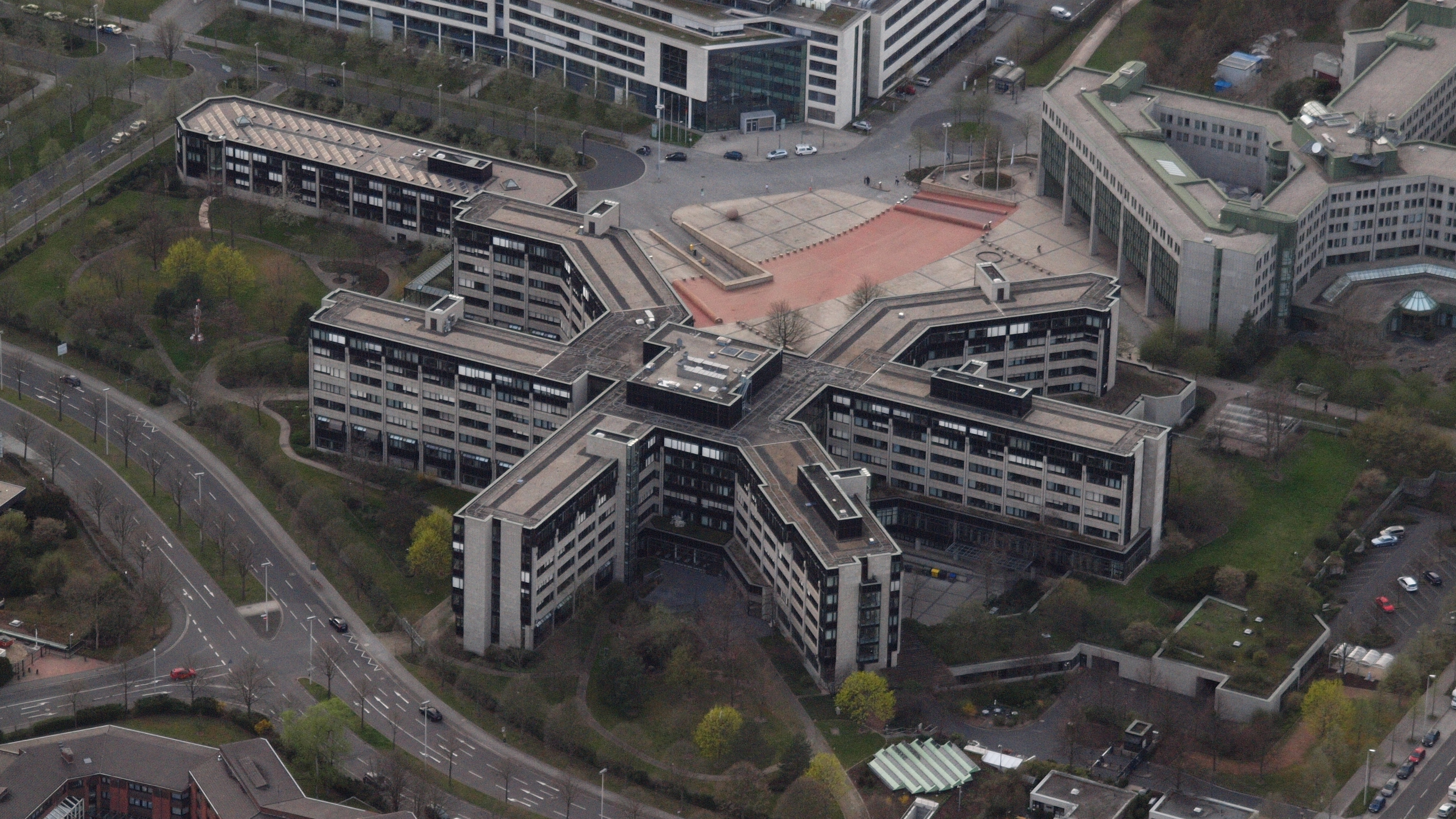
Bundesministerium für Verkehr

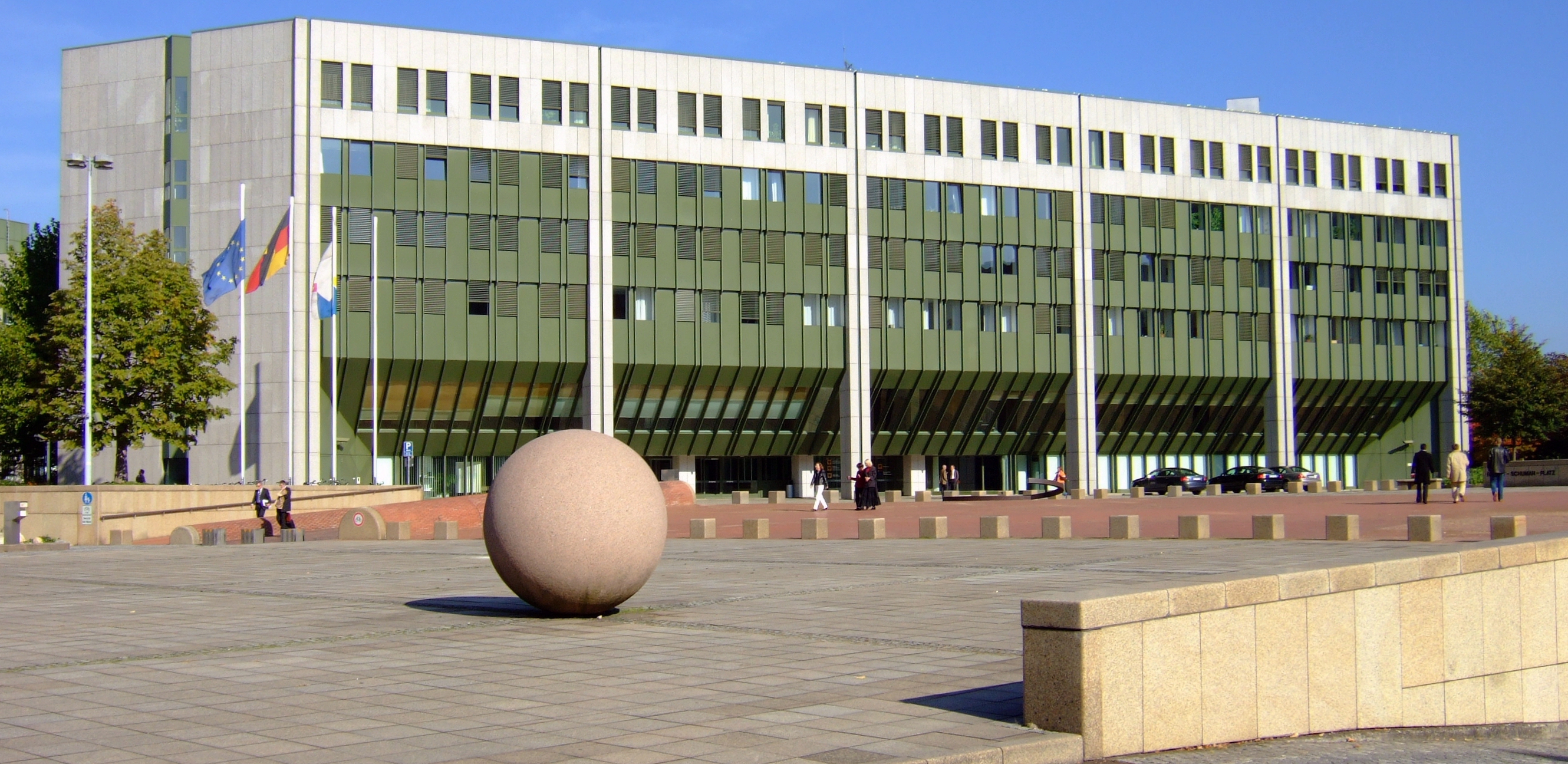
Bundesministerium für Umwelt, Klimaschutz, Naturschutz und nukleare Sicherheit

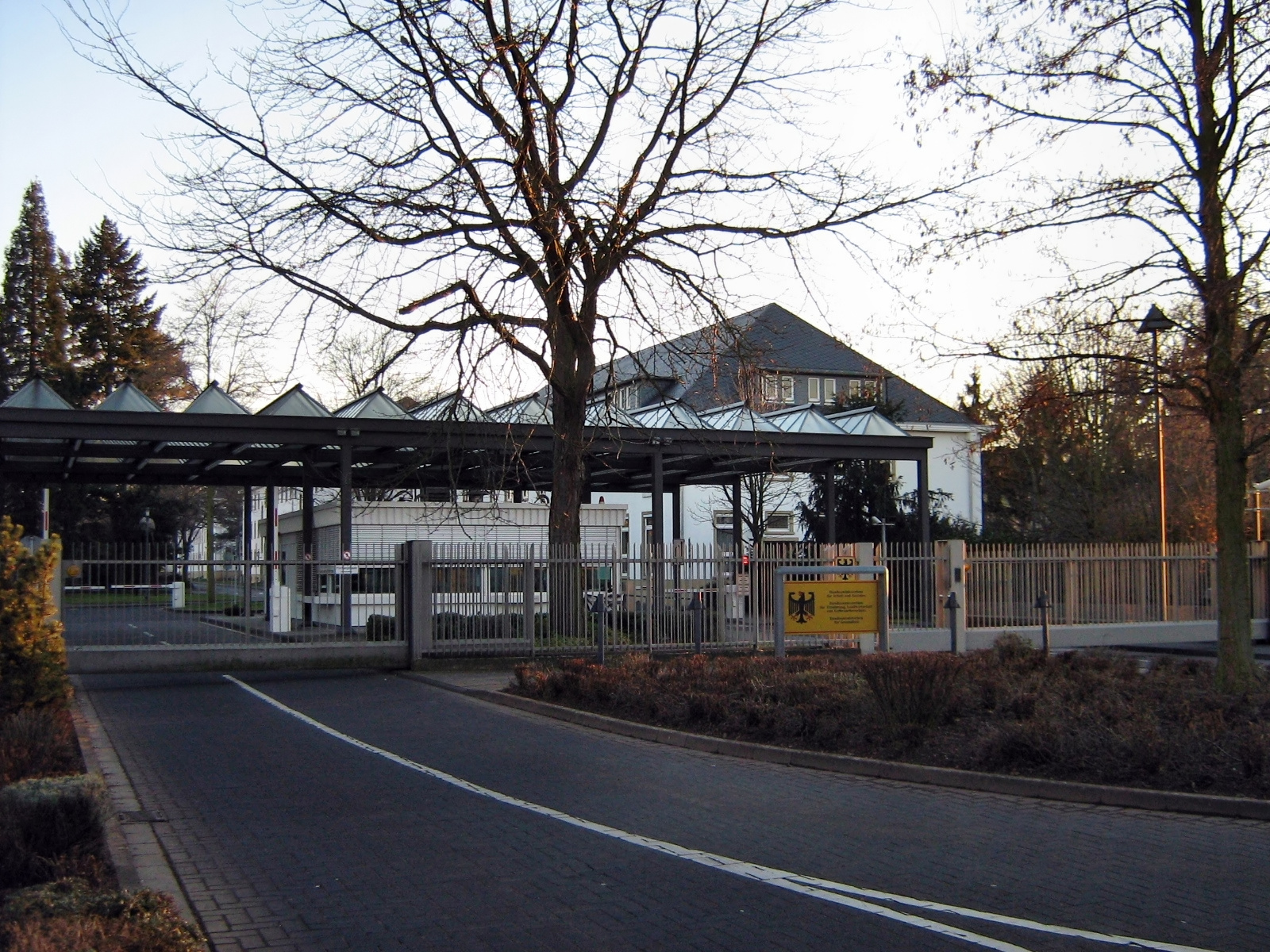
Bundesministerium für Arbeit und Soziales

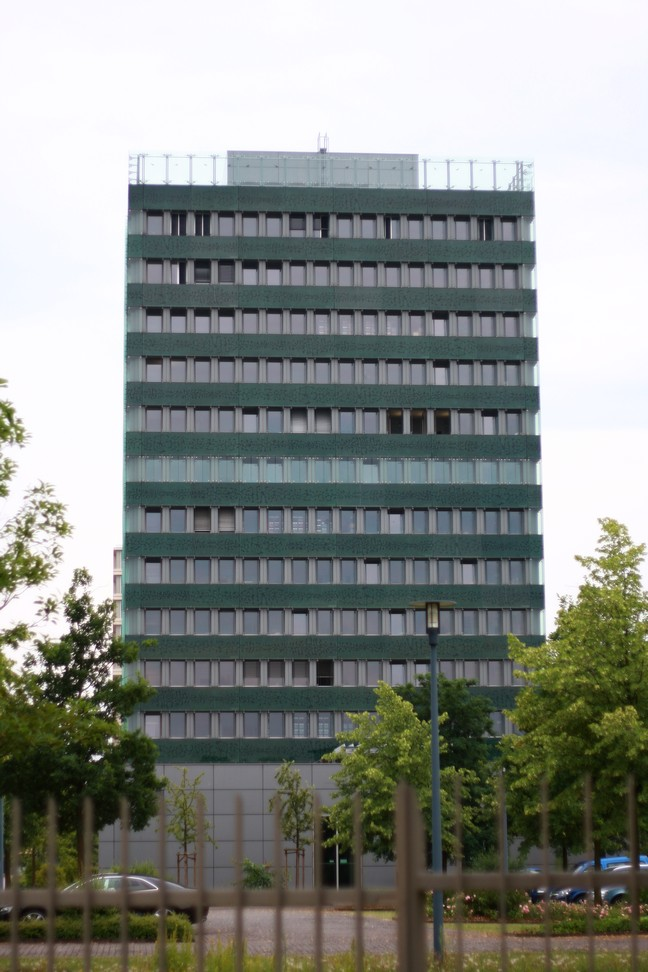
Bundesministerium für Gesundheit

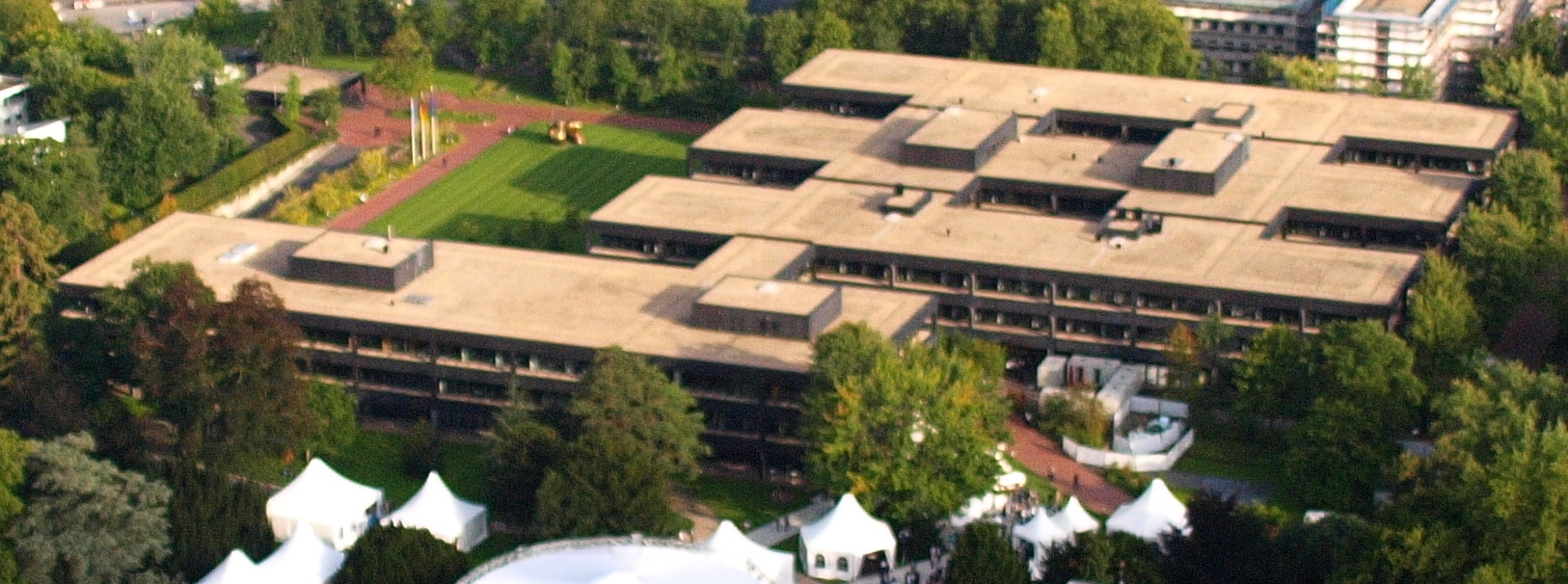
Bundesministerium für wirtschaftliche Zusammenarbeit und Entwicklung

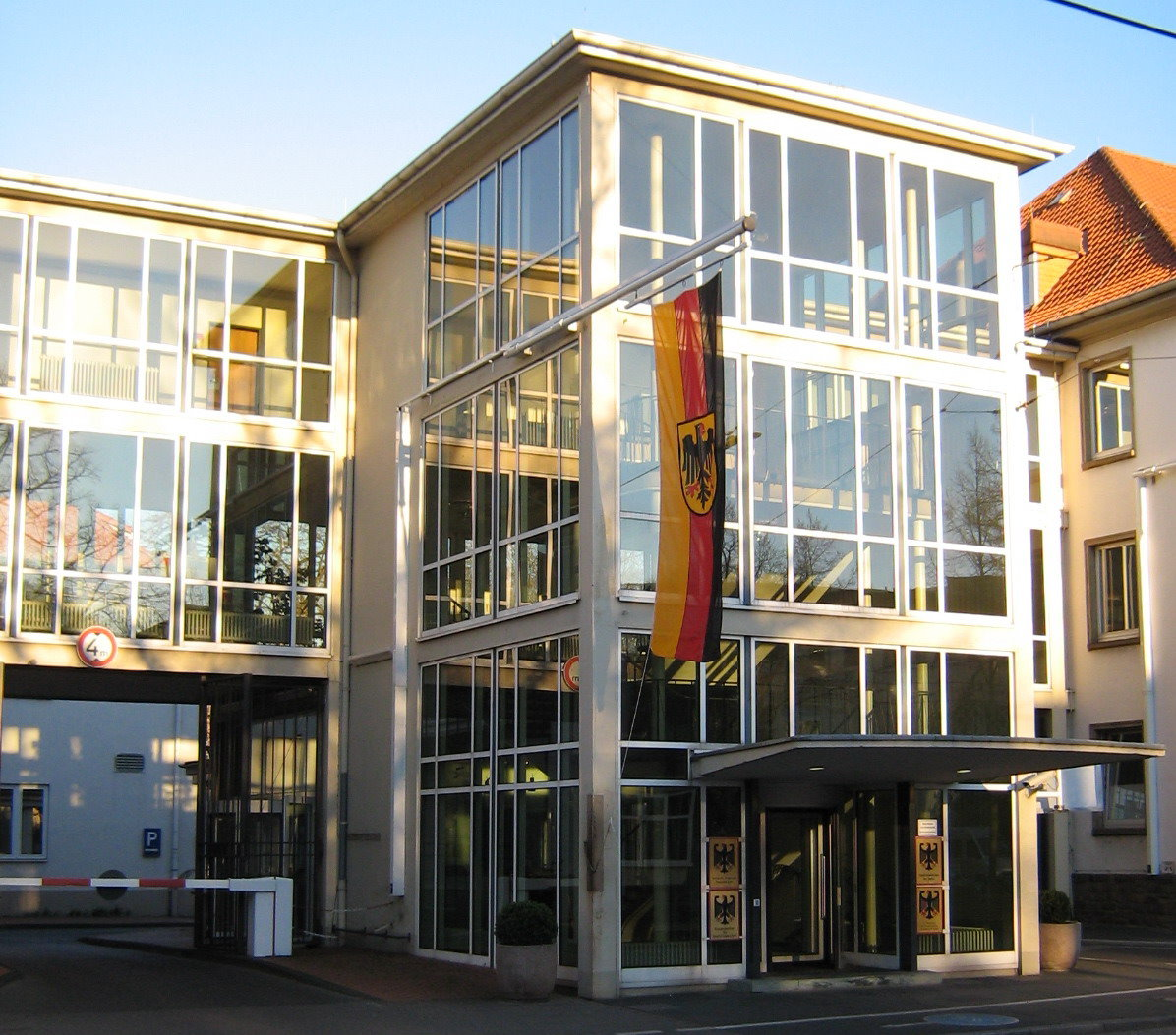
Bundesministerium für Wohnen, Stadtentwicklung und Bauwesen

== Literature ==
- Die Bundesministerien 1949–1999. Bezeichnungen, amtliche Abkürzungen, Zuständigkeiten, Aufbauorganisation, Leitungspersonen. Materialien aus dem Bundesarchiv. Wirtschaftsverlag NW GmbH. 2003. ISBN 3-86509-075-3.
