= Federal Ministry of Research, Technology and Space =

Ministry of the Federal Republic of Germany

- Bundesministerium für Forschung, Technologie und Raumfahrt

Agency overview
- Formed: 20 October 1955 (70 years ago) as the Federal Ministry for Atomic Affairs
- Jurisdiction: Government of Germany
- Headquarters: Bonn, Germany; 50°42′12.31″N 7°8′21.01″E
- Minister responsible: Dorothee Bär, Federal Minister of the Interior
- Agency executive: Christoph de Vries, Parliamentary State Secretary
- Website: www.bmftr.bund.de

The Federal Ministry for Research, Technology and Space (German: Bundesministerium für Forschung, Technologie und Raumfahrt (BMFTR)) is a government ministry and supreme federal authority of the Federal Republic of Germany. Its headquarters, or primary office, is located in the so-called Kreuzbauten (Cross Buildings) in the federal city of Bonn, and its secondary office is in Berlin. Dorothee Bär from the Christian Social Union (CSU) has been the Federal Minister for Research, Technology and Space in the Merz cabinet since 6 May 2025.

== History ==
The origins of the Federal Ministry for Research, Technology and Space dated back to 20 October 1955, when the Federal Ministry for Atomic Affairs (BMAt) was founded under Chancellor Konrad Adenauer. Franz Josef Strauss, who later served as Minister-President of Bavaria, was appointed its first Federal Minister.

The Federal Ministry for Atomic Affairs was tasked with promoting the peaceful use of nuclear energy and was located in the former Hotel Godesberger Hof in Bad Godesberg, which had been converted into an office building. In 1957, it was renamed the Federal Ministry for Nuclear Energy and Water Management (BMAtW) and in 1961 the Federal Ministry for Nuclear Energy (BMAt). With its renaming in 1962 to the Federal Ministry for Scientific Research (BMwF), it also became responsible for general scientific promotion and the promotion of space research. A constitutional amendment in 1969 expanded the federal government's powers in educational planning and research funding, and the ministry was therefore renamed the Federal Ministry of Education and Science (BMBW), a name it retained until 1994.

In 1972, the Federal Ministry for Research and Technology (BMFT) was founded to promote basic research, applied research, and technological development. The head of the central department from 1971 to 1982 was Friedrich Bischoff, who had previously served as the chief administrative officer of the Hanover district. For more than two decades, the two ministries remained separate. After the 1994 German federal election, the two ministries were merged, and the new ministry was named the Federal Ministry of Education, Science, Research and Technology (BMBF). With this expanded scope of responsibilities, it was sometimes referred to as the "Ministry of the Future". Following the change of government in 1998, the BMBF transferred the Technology Policy division to the Federal Ministry for Economic Affairs and Technology and therefore bore the name Federal Ministry of Education and Research until 2025. In the Merz cabinet, the education portfolio was transferred to the former Ministry for Family Affairs, the technology portfolio was reintegrated, and responsibility for space travel was explicitly named, so that the ministry is now called the Federal Ministry for Research, Technology and Space.

Between 1999 and 2014, the ministry's Berlin office was located in the former building of the Permanent Mission of the Federal Republic of Germany to the GDR, before it opened its building on Kapelle-Ufer in November 2014. This provides sufficient space to concentrate the entire ministry at this location.

== Construction ==
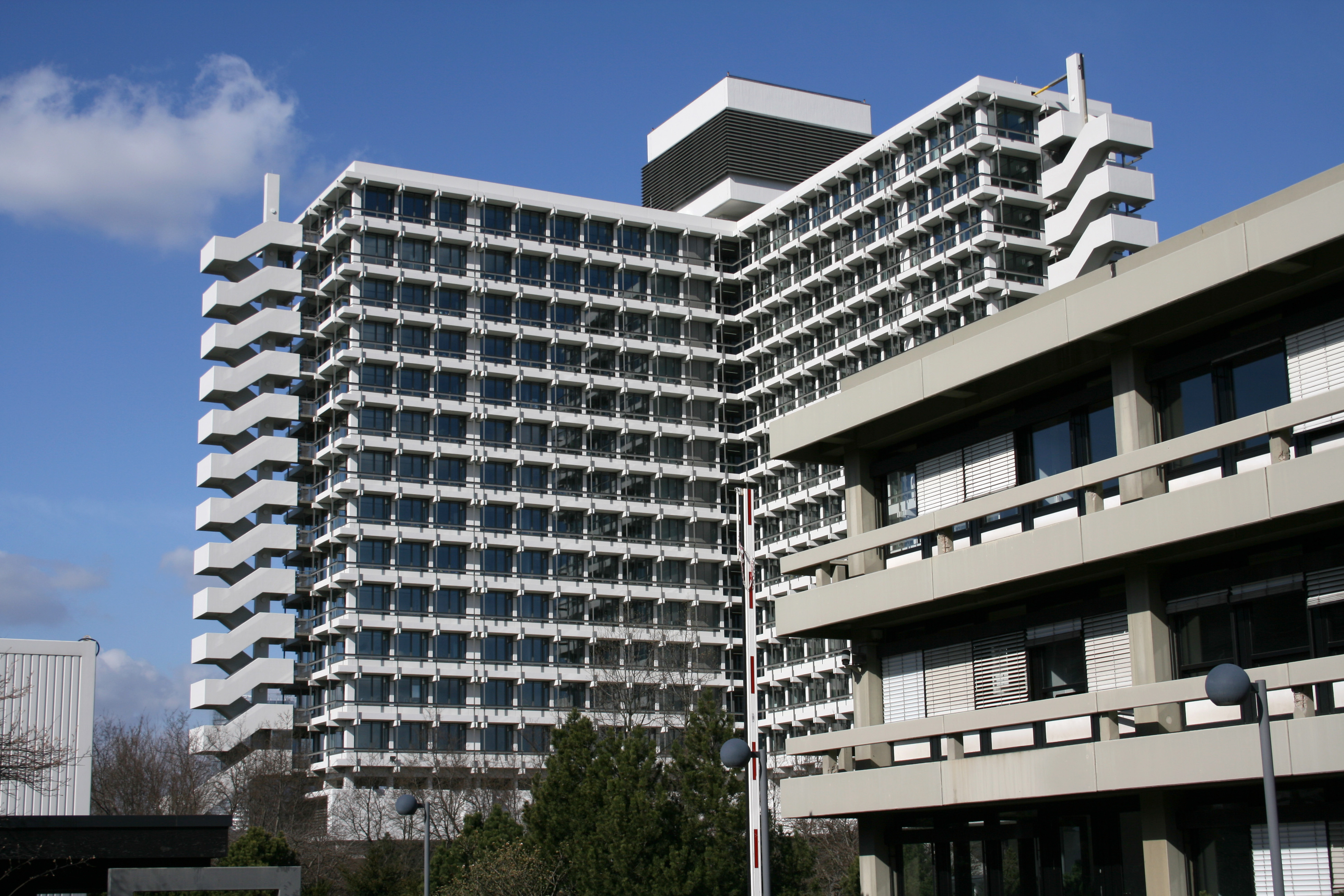
The BMFTR headquarters are located in the so-called Kreuzbauten buildings in Bonn.

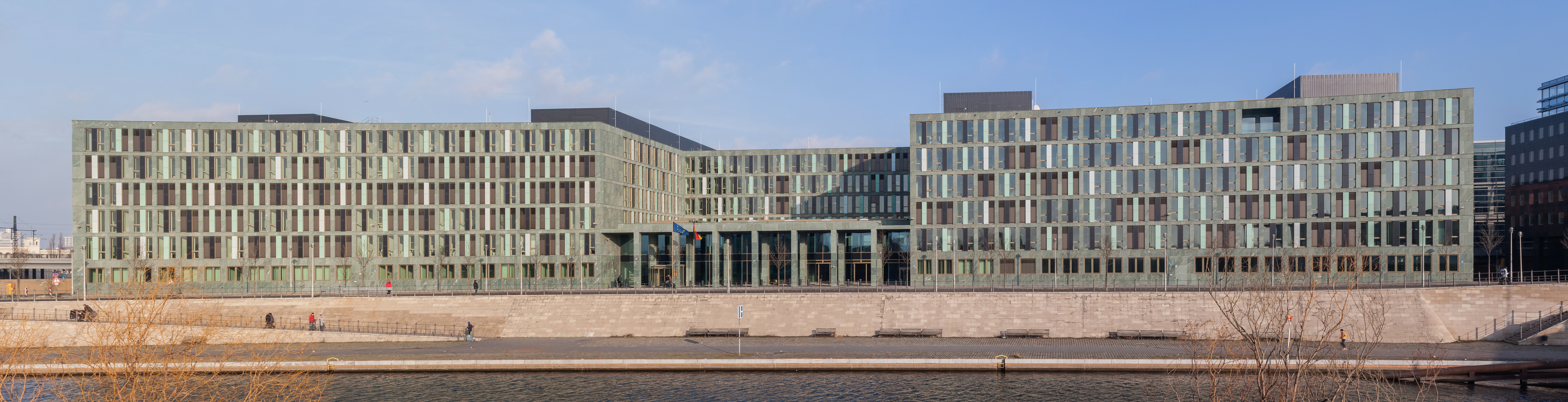
Berlin office of the BMFTR on Kapelle-Ufer

The BMFTR consists of nine departments. These are, in addition to the management department and the central department (Zentralabteilung), which is responsible for administrative tasks:

- Department S: Strategies and Fundamental Issues
- Department I: International and Europe
- Department R: Space and Security
- Department W: Science and Research System; Talents
- Department T: Technological Sovereignty and Innovation
- Department G: Health and Life Sciences
- Department F: Future Planning – Research for Fundamental and Sustainable Development

Each department consists of two or three sub-departments and between 10 and 15 sections (Department). Most of the sections are located at the Bonn office, and fewer at the Berlin office. The BMFTR employs approximately 1,500 people in total. In addition, two Parliamentary State Secretaries are part of the management staff.

== Duties ==
On the one hand, the BMFTR is primarily responsible for legislation in various areas. On the other hand, the BMFTR promotes research in all areas of science through financial resources. It also promotes international exchange in research, technology and space exploration, and higher education. The core budget of the BMFTR (budget line 30) amounts to approximately € 21.8 billion in 2026. An additional €1.6 billion is provided from two special funds. The core budget is the sixth largest budget line in the 2026 federal budget. It is thus about twice the size of that of the Federal Ministry of Finance.

== Science Year ==
The Federal Ministry of Research, Technology and Space has been organizing the Science Years since 2000. Each Science Year focuses on a specific scientific discipline or current scientific topic. The Science Years serve to stimulate public debate about developments in science and research. The Science Year 2026, themed "Medicine of the Future," was co-designed by departments within the Ministry. The Science Year aims to demonstrate how research can improve medicine. In particular, it seeks to highlight the impact of medical innovations on patients' daily lives and how AI can contribute to the early detection of diseases.

== Funding for research projects ==
The Federal Ministry for Digital and Economic Affairs (BMFTR) initially provides the basic funding for the German Research Foundation and the Helmholtz Association, as well as a portion of the basic funding for the Max Planck Society and the Fraunhofer-Gesellschaft. In addition, it funds research projects through grant programs for which applicants must apply. Examples of such grant programs include:

- The research framework programme “Research for Sustainable Development (FONA)”
- The “ICT2020” with the future project Industrie 4.0 within the “Hightech-Strategie” of the Federal Government
- The Spitzencluster-Wettbewerb
- The focus on IT security research
- The “research for tomorrow’s production”
- The focus “Religion, cultural diversity and civil society”
- The “Copernicus projects for the energy transition”

The Federal Ministry for Research and Technology (BMFTR) entrusts the technical and administrative support of research projects to so-called project management agencies, such as the DLR Project Management Agency, the Jülich Project Management Agency, or the VDI/VDE Innovation + Technik. Public relations activities are funded alongside such funding programs. One example is the NanoTruck, which aims to inform the general public about nanotechnology . Together with the Federal Ministry of Health, the BMFTR is responsible, among other things, for the German Federal Government's health research program.

Furthermore, the BMFTR, together with the Federal Ministry for Economic Affairs and Energy, commissions the Health Research Programme.

== German Centers for Health Research ==
Since 2007, the BMFTR has established a number of German Centers for Health Research, which aim to achieve progress in addressing major widespread diseases through collaborations between numerous research institutions. These are:

- German Consortium for Translational Cancer Research
- German Center for Diabetes Research
- German Center for Cardiovascular Research
- German Center for Infection Research
- German Center for Lung Research
- German Center for Neurodegenerative Diseases

In 2021, the construction of two further centers began:

- German Center for Child and Adolescent Health
- German Center for Mental Health

== Federal Ministers since 1955 ==
No.	name	Life dates	party	Start of term of office	End of term of office	Cabinet(s)
Federal Minister for Nuclear Issues
1	Franz Josef Strauß	1915–1988	CSU	20. October 1955	16 October 1956	Adenauer II
2	Siegfried Balke	1902–1984	CSU	16 October 1956	29 October 1957	Adenauer II
Federal Minister for Nuclear Energy and Water Management
2	Siegfried Balke	1902–1984	CSU	29 October 1957	14 November 1961	Adenauer III
Federal Minister for Nuclear Energy
2	Siegfried Balke	1902–1984	CSU	14 November 1961	14 December 1962	Adenauer IV
Federal Minister for Scientific Research
3	Hans Lenz	1907–1968	FDP	14 December 1962	26 October 1965	Adenauer V Erhard I
4	Gerhard Stoltenberg	1928–2001	CDU	26 October 1965	22 October 1969	Erhard II Kiesinger
Federal Minister for Education and Science
5	Hans Leussink	1912–2008	non-partisan	22 October 1969	15 March 1972	Brandt I
6	Klaus von Dohnanyi	* 1928	SPD	15 March 1972	17 May 1974	Brandt I Brandt II
7	Helmut Rohde	1925–2016	SPD	17 May 1974	16 February 1978	Schmidt I Schmidt II
8	Jürgen Schmude	1936–2025	SPD	16 February 1978	28 January 1981	Schmidt II Schmidt III
9	Björn Engholm	* 1939	SPD	28 January 1981	4 October 1982	Schmidt III
10	Dorothee Wilms	* 1929	CDU	4 October 1982	12 March 1987	Kohl I Kohl II
11	Jürgen Möllemann	1945–2003	FDP	12 March 1987	18 January 1991	Kohl III
12	Rainer Ortleb	* 1944	FDP	18 January 1991	4 February 1994	Kohl IV
13	Karl-Hans Laermann	1929–2024	FDP	4 February 1994	17 November 1994	Kohl IV
Federal Minister for Research and Technology
1	Horst Ehmke	1927–2017	SPD	15 December 1972	17 May 1974	Brandt II
2	Hans Matthöfer	1925–2009	SPD	17 May 1974	16 February 1978	Schmidt I Schmidt II
3	Volker Hauff	* 1940	SPD	16 February 1978	5 November 1980	Schmidt II
4	Andreas von Bülow	* 1937	SPD	5 November 1980	4 October 1982	Schmidt III
5	Heinz Riesenhuber	* 1935	CDU	4 October 1982	21 January 1993	Kohl I Kohl II Kohl III Kohl IV
6	Matthias Wissmann	* 1949	CDU	21 January 1993	13 May 1993	Kohl IV
7	Paul Krüger	* 1950	CDU	13 May 1993	17 November 1994	Kohl IV
Federal Minister for Education, Science, Research and Technology
14/8	Jürgen Rüttgers	* 1951	CDU	17 November 1994	27 October 1998	Kohl V
Federal Minister of Education and Research
15/9	Edelgard Bulmahn	* 1951	SPD	27 October 1998	22 November 2005	Schröder I Schröder II
16/10	Annette Schavan	* 1955	CDU	22 November 2005	14 February 2013	Merkel I Merkel II
17/11	Johanna Wanka	* 1951	CDU	14 February 2013	14 March 2018	Merkel II Merkel III
18/12	Anja Karliczek	* 1971	CDU	14 March 2018	8 December 2021	Merkel IV
19/13	Bettina Stark-Watzinger	* 1968	FDP	8 December 2021	7 November 2024	Scholz
20/14	Cem Özdemir	* 1965	Grüne	7 November 2024	6 May 2025	Scholz
Federal Minister for Research, Technology and Space
15	Dorothee Bär	* 1978	CSU	6 May 2025	Incumbent	Merz

== Parliamentary State Secretaries ==
- 1969–1972: Klaus von Dohnanyi (SPD)
- 1972: Joachim Raffert (SPD)
- 1972–1978: Volker Hauff (SPD)
- 1974–1977: Peter Glotz (SPD)
- 1977–1981: Björn Engholm (SPD)
- 1978–1982: Erwin Stahl (SPD)
- 1981–1982: Eckart Kuhlwein (SPD)
- 1982–1987: Anton Pfeifer (CDU)
- 1982–1991: Albert Probst (CSU)
- 1987–1989: Irmgard Karwatzki (CDU)
- 1991–1993 Torsten Wolfgramm (FDP)
- 1989–1994: Norbert Lammert (CDU)
- 1991–1998: Bernd Neumann (CDU)
- 1994–1997: Cornelia Yzer (CDU)
- 1997–1998: Elke Wülfing (CDU)
- 1998–2002: Wolf-Michael Catenhusen (SPD)
- 2002–2004: Christoph Matschie (SPD)
- 2004–2005: Ulrich Kasparick (SPD)
- 2005–2009: Andreas Storm (CDU)
- 2005–2021: Thomas Rachel (CDU)
- 2009–2013: Helge Braun (CDU)
- 2013–2018: Stefan Müller (CSU)
- 2018–2021: Michael Meister (CDU)
- 2021–2022: Thomas Sattelberger (FDP)
- 2021–2024: Jens Brandenburg (FDP)
- 2022–2024: Mario Brandenburg (FDP)
- 2024–2025: Claudia Müller (Grüne)
- since 2025: Matthias Hauer (CDU)
- since 2025: Silke Launert (CSU)

== Civil servants, state secretaries ==
- 1962–1966: Wolfgang Cartellieri
- 1966–1971: Hans von Heppe
- 1969–1972: Hildegard Hamm-Brücher (FDP)
- 1971–1987: Hans-Hilger Haunschild
- 1973–1978: Reimut Jochimsen (SPD)
- 1978–1982: Hermann Granzow (SPD)
- 1982–1987: Paul Harro Piazolo
- 1987–1988: Eberhard Böning (FDP)
- 1988–1998: Fritz Schaumann (FDP)
- 1987–1996: Gebhard Ziller
- 1996–1998: Helmut Stahl (CDU)
- 1998–2005: Uwe Thomas (SPD)
- 2002–2005: Wolf-Dieter Dudenhausen
- 2003–2005: Wolf-Michael Catenhusen (SPD)
- 2005–2009: Frieder Meyer-Krahmer
- 2006–2008: Michael Thielen (CDU)
- 2008–2018: Cornelia Quennet-Thielen
- 2009–2019: Georg Schütte
- 2018–2021: Christian Luft
- 2019–2021: Wolf-Dieter Lukas
- 2021–2023: Kornelia Haugg
- 2022–2024: Judith Pirscher (FDP)
- 2023–2024: Sabine Döring
- 2024: Roland Philippi (FDP)
- 2024–2025: Karl-Eugen Huthmacher
- 2024–2025: Stephan Ertner
- since 2025: Marcus Pleyer
- since 2025: Rolf-Dieter Jungk

== Literature ==
- Thomas Raithel, Niels Weise: Für die Zukunft des deutschen Volkes – Das bundesdeutsche Atom- und Forschungsministerium zwischen Vergangenheit und Neubeginn 1955–1972. Wallstein, Göttingen 2022, ISBN 978-3-8353-5075-5.
- Peter Weingart, Niels C. Taubert (Hrsg.): Das Wissensministerium. Ein halbes Jahrhundert Forschungs- und Bildungspolitik in Deutschland. Velbrück, Weilerswist 2006, ISBN 978-3-938808-18-4.
- Matthias Kölbel: Das Bundesministerium für Bildung und Forschung (BMBF) als wissenschaftspolitischer Akteur. In: Handbuch Wissenschaftspolitik. VS Verlag für Sozialwissenschaften, Wiesbaden 2016, ISBN 978-3-658-14058-8.

== See also ==
- Reich Ministry of Science, Education and Culture
