= Federal Government of Germany =

- Bundesregierung
- Federal government
- Logo (top) and coat of arms (bottom)

Overview
- Ministries: 16 federal ministries

The Federal Government (German: Bundesregierung, pronounced [ˈbʊndəsʁeˌɡiːʁʊŋ]; abbr. BReg) is the chief executive body of the Federal Republic of Germany and exercises executive power at the federal level. It consists of the Federal Chancellor and the Federal Ministers. The fundamentals of the government's organisation, as well as the method of its election and appointment, along with the procedure for its dismissal, are set down in the sixth section (articles 62 to 69) of the German Basic Law (Grundgesetz).

The Chancellor and the other members of the government are allowed also to be members of the Bundestag, but are not required to be so.

An extended body is the Federal Cabinet (Bundeskabinett), which includes the Federal Government (consisting of the Federal Chancellor and Federal Ministers), the Head of the Federal Chancellery and its Parliamentary State Secretary, the Head of the Office of the Federal President, the Head of the Federal Press Office and the Personal Advisor to the Federal Chancellor. In addition, the word "cabinet" is commonly used to distinguish between previous and current Federal Governments. For example, the fourth federal government under Chancellor Angela Merkel was the Fourth Merkel cabinet (Kabinett Merkel IV).

== Election and appointment ==
The Chancellor is Germany's chief executive leader; accordingly, a government's tenure is linked to the Chancellor's tenure, which is in turn linked to parliamentary confidence. The Chancellor's term begins with their appointment by the President of Germany and regularly ends when a newly elected Bundestag sits for the first time.

The Chancellor is elected by the federal parliament (Bundestag) on proposal of the President of Germany with a majority of all members of the Bundestag (Chancellor-majority). However, the Bundestag is free to disregard the President's proposal, in which case the parliament may within 14 days hold further ballots and try to elect another individual, which the parties in the Bundestag can now propose themselves. In order to be elected, a candidate still needs the Chancellor-majority. The President of Germany has to appoint a canidadate elected by that majority. If the Bundestag fails to elect a candidate during the 14 days following the first ballot, a last ballot will be held on the 15th day (again the parties in the Bundestag may field candidates): If an individual is elected with the Chancellor-majority, the President must appoint them as Chancellor. If not, the President is free to either appoint the individual, who received a plurality of votes on this last ballot, as Chancellor or to dissolve the Bundestag and call a snap election within 60 days.

Following their election in the Bundestag, the Chancellor-elect will visit Bellevue Palace, the residence of the President, to receive a certificate of appointment. This is the moment, the elected individual actually enters office. After this short appointment-ceremony, the Chancellor returns to the Bundestag, in order to take the oath of office. Having taken the oath, the Chancellor will once again visit Bellevue Palace, this time joined by the individuals he intends to propose as cabinet ministers. The President will officially appoint the new government members, again handing over certificates of appointment. After the ministers are appointed, they return to the Bundestag and take their oaths of office, completing the appointment-process.

== Regular end of term and caretaker cabinets ==
The term of office of the Federal Government normally ends with the start of a new legislative session of the Bundestag, as the Chancellor loses his parliamentary legitimacy at this moment. Traditionally, the members of the government receive their dismissal certificates from the President immediately after the constituent session of the new parliament. If a new Chancellor has not yet been elected in the constituent session, the President may, according to Article 69 (3) of the Basic Law, request the former Chancellor to remain in office as acting Chancellor until his successor is elected (if the Chancellor refuses to do so, the President may also appoint the former Vice Chancellor to act as Chancellor); the acting Chancellor may then, in turn, make a binding request to the former cabinet ministers to remain in office in an acting capacity, thus forming a caretaker government. (Note: This is how it has been handled in practice at the beginning of every legislative session so far (as of 2026); on the one hand, it is not in keeping with political tradition to hold the constitution of parliament and the election of the chancellor in one session and, on the other, the formation of a government is usually preceded by lengthy coalition negotiations, which can only rarely be concluded in the period between the election and the constitution of parliament (maximum four weeks). Only once did the election of the Chancellor take place on the first day of the legislative session: on 29 March 1983, the Bundestag first convened in the morning for its constituent session and then held the chancellor election in its second session in the evening; accordingly, even in this case, the old government, the first Kohl cabinet, had to remain in office in an acting capacity for a few hours.) A caretaker government in principle has all the rights of a regular government; the Chancellor merely loses the right to table a motion of confidence in the Bundestag and cannot propose new ministers for appointment. In practice, it is also customary that if a caretaker Chancellor does not intend to or cannot expect to be re-elected, they closely coordinate their governance with their probable successor as soon as such a person becomes apparent in the course of government formation.

== Premature end of term ==
The Chancellor may prematurely leave office through death or resignation, which also immediately ends the term of the entire cabinet. In these cases, the President, as in case of a regular term end, entrusts the former Chancellor with continuing to serve on an acting basis with an acting cabinet until a new Chancellor is elected. If the former Chancellor is no longer available for this purpose, the President can also appoint the (former) Vice Chancellor as acting Chancellor.

Furthermore, the Chancellor's (and thus the government's) term of office can also end by losing the confidence of Parliament. However, the Bundestag can only express no confidence in the Chancellor by simultaneously electing a new Chancellor with a majority of its members (known as a constructive vote of no confidence). In this case, an immediate change of government takes place. This procedure has been put in place to ensure that there will not be a political vacuum left by the removal of Chancellor through a vote of no confidence and the failure to elect a new one in their place, as had happened during the Weimar period with the Reichstag removing Chancellors but failing to agree on the election of a new one.

If the Chancellor loses a simple confidence motion, which only they themself can table, this does not force them out of office, but allows the Chancellor, if they wish to do so, to ask the President of Germany for the dissolution of the Bundestag, triggering a snap election within 60 days (this happened in 1972, 1983, 2005 and 2025), or to ask the President to declare a legislative state of emergency, which allows the government to use a simplified legislative procedure, in which bills proposed by the government only need the consent of the Bundesrat (as yet, this has never been applied). The President is, however, not bound to follow the Chancellor's request in both cases.

In case of the Chancellor's incapacity to perform their duties, the Vice Chancellor would assume the Chancellor's office temporarily. Should an incapacity prove to be permanent, the question arises as to how a new chancellor can take office; this is not regulated by the constitution. In any case, the Bundestag could elect a new chancellor through a constructive vote of no confidence, but such an instrumental use of this option would, of course, be rather unelegant. It is controversial whether the Vice Chancellor as acting Chancellor could, in such a case, submit a vote of confidence to trigger new elections; in any case, the prevailing opinion rules out the possibility of the Vice Chancellor declaring the Chancellor's resignation and thus paving the way for a Chancellor election.

== Functioning ==
The Chancellor is responsible for guiding the government and deciding its political direction (Richtlinienkompetenz). According to the principle of departmentalization (Ressortprinzip), the government ministers are free to carry out their duties independently within the boundaries set by the Chancellor's political directives. The Chancellor may at any time ask the President to dismiss a minister or to appoint a new minister; the President's appointment is only a formality, he may not refuse a Chancellor's request for dismissal or appointment of a minister. The Chancellor also decides the scope of each minister's duties and can at his own discretion nominate ministers heading a department and so-called ministers for special affairs without an own department. A Chancellor can also lead a department himself; this is not usual, but it has occurred on three occasions with Konrad Adenauer and Helmut Schmidt, also serving as Minister of Foreign Affairs.

The Chancellor's freedom to shape his government is only limited by some constitutional provisions: The Chancellor has to appoint a Minister of Defence, a Minister of Economic Affairs and a Minister of Justice and is implicitly forbidden to head one of these departments himself, as the constitution invests these ministers with some special powers. For example, the Minister of Defence is commander-in-chief during peacetime (only in wartime does the Chancellor becomes supreme commander), the Minister of Economic Affairs may veto decisions by the Federal Cartel Office and the Minister of Justice appoints and dismisses the Public Prosecutor General. The Cabinet decides unanimously on all matters; if unanimity cannot be reached on a particular issue, the matter is either postponed or decided by the Chancellor using his authority to issue directives. However, the latter happens relatively rarely, as coalition governments consisting of several parties are usually in office in Germany and the chancellor can only act against the will of ministers from the coalition parties to a limited extent without risking a collapse of the government coalition.

The Chancellor has to appoint one of the government ministers as Vice Chancellor, who may deputise for the Chancellor in their absence. In coalition governments the Vice Chancellor is usually the highest ranking minister of the second-biggest coalition party. If the Chancellor dies or is unwilling or unable to act as Chancellor after the end of their term, until a new Chancellor has been elected, the Vice Chancellor becomes Acting Chancellor until the election of a new Chancellor by the Bundestag, who then has to form a new government. (To date, this has happened once: On 7 May 1974 Chancellor Willy Brandt resigned and declared his refusal to act as Chancellor until his successor's election. Vice Chancellor Walter Scheel was appointed as Acting Chancellor and served until the election of Helmut Schmidt on 16 May.)

The Chancellor is in charge of the government's administrative affairs, which are usually delegated to the Head of staff of the Chancellery, who is usually also appointed as minister for special affairs. Details are laid down in the government's rules for internal procedures (Geschäftsordnung). These state, for example, that the government is quorate only if at least half of the ministers including the chair (the Chancellor or in their absence the Vice Chancellor) are present. The government regularly convenes on Wednesday mornings in the Chancellery.

According to article 26 of the Basic Law weapons intended for warfare may only be manufactured, transported and placed on the market with the approval of the Federal Government in order to secure international peace. This and security policy are the tasks of the Federal Security Council (Bundessicherheitsrat), a government committee chaired by the Chancellor. Pursuant to its (classified) rules of procedure, its sessions are confidential. According to practice, the Federal Government presents an annual report on arms exports, which contains statistical information on export permits issued and gives figures for the types of arms concerned as well as their destination. As a general rule, the Federal Government, if asked, is required to inform the Bundestag that the Federal Security Council has approved a given armaments export transaction or not.

== Current cabinet ==
The current and 25th federal government of Germany has been in office since 6 May 2025, the day Friedrich Merz was elected Chancellor by the members of the 21st German Bundestag. It currently consists of 17 ministers:

The composition of the cabinet by the number of ministers as per the parties
| Party | Ministers | Percentage |
|---|---|---|
| Christian Democratic Union | 7 | 41% |
| Social Democratic Party | 7 | 41% |
| Christian Social Union | 3 | 18% |
| Total | 17 | 100% |

In addition to the chancellor, the cabinet consists of 17 ministers, 16 of whom have their own portfolio and one is Minister for Special Affairs (in order to give cabinet rank to the head of the chancellery). The total number of ministers has thus risen by one in comparison to the Scholz cabinet. The Federal Ministry for Digital and State Modernisation has been newly created as a split from the transport ministry and parts of the portfolio of the ministry for the interior and of the ministry for economic affairs. Other portfolio reshuffles includes the re-integration of climate action back into the ministry for the environment; it had been merged with economic affairs under outgoing minister Robert Habeck. The responsibility for international climate policy and climate negotiations was also transferred to the ministry for the environment from the foreign office. The responsibility for education is being merged with the portfolio of family, seniors, women and youth affairs, while the remaining ministry for research has been given the added designations of technology and astronautics.

| Order | Office | Portrait | Minister | Party | Took office | Left office |
|---|---|---|---|---|---|---|
| 1 | Chancellor | | Friedrich Merz | CDU | 6 May 2025 | Incumbent |
| 2 | Vice Chancellor | | Lars Klingbeil | SPD | 6 May 2025 | Incumbent |
| 2 | Federal Minister of Finance | | Lars Klingbeil | SPD | 6 May 2025 | Incumbent |
| 3 | Federal Minister of the Interior | | Alexander Dobrindt | CSU | 6 May 2025 | Incumbent |
| 4 | Federal Minister for Foreign Affairs | | Johann Wadephul | CDU | 6 May 2025 | Incumbent |
| 5 | Federal Minister of Defence | | Boris Pistorius | SPD | 19 January 2023 (renewed on 6 May 2025) | Incumbent |
| 6 | Federal Minister for Economic Affairs and Energy | | Katherina Reiche | CDU | 6 May 2025 | Incumbent |
| 7 | Federal Minister of Research, Technology and Space | | Dorothee Bär | CSU | 6 May 2025 | Incumbent |
| 8 | Federal Minister of Justice and Consumer Protection | | Stefanie Hubig | SPD | 6 May 2025 | Incumbent |
| 9 | Federal Minister for Education, Family Affairs, Senior Citizens, Women and Youth | | Karin Prien | CDU | 6 May 2025 | Incumbent |
| 10 | Federal Minister of Labour and Social Affairs | | Bärbel Bas | SPD | 6 May 2025 | 12 October 2026 |
| 10 | Federal Minister of Labour and Social Affairs | | Alexander Schweitzer | SPD | designated | |
| 11 | Federal Minister for Digital Transformation and Government Modernisation | | Karsten Wildberger | Ind (before 9 May 2025) | 6 May 2025 | Incumbent |
| 11 | Federal Minister for Digital Transformation and Government Modernisation | | Karsten Wildberger | CDU (after 9 May 2025) | 6 May 2025 | Incumbent |
| 12 | Federal Minister for Transport | | Patrick Schnieder | CDU | 6 May 2025 | 29 July 2026 |
| 12 | Federal Minister for Transport | | Steffen Bilger | CDU | 29 July 2026 | Incumbent |
| 13 | Federal Minister for the Environment, Climate Action, Nature Conservation and Nuclear Safety | | Carsten Schneider | SPD | 6 May 2025 | Incumbent |
| 14 | Federal Minister of Health | | Nina Warken | CDU | 6 May 2025 | 29 July 2026 |
| 14 | Federal Minister of Health | | Carsten Linnemann | CDU | 29 July 2026 | Incumbent |
| 15 | Federal Minister of Agriculture, Food and Regional Identity | | Alois Rainer | CSU | 6 May 2025 | Incumbent |
| 16 | Federal Minister for Economic Cooperation and Development | | Reem Alabali-Radovan | SPD | 6 May 2025 | Incumbent |
| 17 | Federal Minister for Housing, Urban Development and Building | | Verena Hubertz | SPD | 6 May 2025 | Incumbent |
| 18 | Federal Minister for Special Affairs Head of the Chancellery | | Thorsten Frei | CDU | 6 May 2025 | 29 July 2026 |
| 18 | Federal Minister for Special Affairs Head of the Chancellery | | Nina Warken | CDU | 29 July 2026 | Incumbent |

== See also ==
- 2025 German federal election
- Council of Ministers (Ministerrat) of the German Democratic Republic (former East Germany)
- Federal Constitutional Court of Germany
- List of Federal Republic of Germany governments
- List of ministers of the Federal Republic of Germany — an alphabetical list of former ministers
