= Irmgard Karwatzki =

German politician (1940-2007)

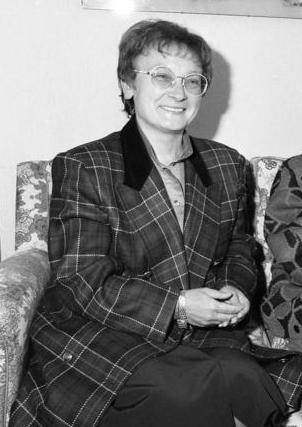
- Karwatzki in 1989

Member of the Bundestag for North Rhine-Westphalia
- In office 14 December 1976 – 18 October 2005

Parliamentary State Secretary to the Federal Ministry for Youth, Family and Health
- In office 4 October 1982 – 25 January 1987
- Chancellor: Helmut Kohl
- Minister: Heiner Geißler (4 October 1982 - 26 September 1985); Rita Süssmuth (26 September 1985 - 25 January 1987)

Parliamentary State Secretary to the Federal Ministry of Education and Science
- In office 12 March 1987 – 21 April 1989
- Chancellor: Helmut Kohl
- Minister: Jürgen Möllemann

Parliamentary State Secretary to the Federal Ministry of Finance
- In office 17 November 1994 – 27 October 1998
- Chancellor: Helmut Kohl
- Minister: Theodor Waigel

Personal details
- Born: 15 December 1940 Duisburg, Germany
- Died: 9 December 2007 (aged 66) Mönchengladbach, Germany
- Party: Christian Democratic Union

Irmgard Karwatzki (15 December 1940 - 9 December 2007) was a German politician and social worker. She was a representative of the Christian Democratic Union of Germany and served in the Bundestag from 1976 to 2005.

== Life ==
Irmgard Karwatzki was born on 15 December 1940 in Duisburg, in the German region of North Rhine-Westphalia. Her father, Eduard Karwatzki, was a dockworker, and she was the youngest of four children.

After attending elementary school from 1947 to 1955, she completed a commercial apprenticeship as an office clerk from 1955 to 1958 at the Klöckner Works. Afterwards, she briefly worked for the company, before becoming a stenographer and clerk for the Duisburg coal wholesaler and shipping company Piepmeyer & Oppenhorst. Feeling unsatisfied with this line of work, in 1963 she completed her university entrance exam, and attended the Higher Technical School for Social Work in Düsseldorf, graduating in 1967 and becoming a state-certified social worker. A devout catholic, she worked as a consultant for the Diocese of Essen in the Federation of German Catholic Youth from 1967 to 1971, and as a lecturer at the Catholic University of Applied Sciences North Rhine-Westphalia from 1971 to 1976.

From 1999 up until her death, Karwatzki was also Deputy Chairwoman of Caritas Germany's Diocese of Essen division, and held a position on the Supervisory Board of the Bank im Bistum Essen.

Karwatzki died of a heart attack on 9 December 2007, shortly before her 67th birthday.

== Political career ==
In 1965, Karwatzki joined the CDU, the political party she felt was most aligned with her Catholic values and desire for complete gender equality, and began her political career at the local level in her hometown of Duisburg. Within a few years, she had already accrued a certain degree of fame, and in 1969 she became an advisor on the Duisburg Health and Social Affairs Committee.

In the 1976 federal election, Karwatzki ran for office, and successfully defeated all of her political opponents, becoming a Member of the Bundestag for North Rhine-Westphalia. She would be re-elected a total of seven more times.

In 1979, Karwatzki ran for mayor of Duisburg, narrowly defeating her opponent and fellow Member of the Bundestag for the CDU Herbert Willi Köhler by a margin of just four votes. She held the position of mayor until 1983. Karwatzki was also a member of the Duisburg City Council from 1975 to 1977 and from 1979 to 1990.

On 4 October 1982, Karwatzki was appointed Parliamentary State Secretary to the Federal Ministry for Youth, Family and Health, at the time held by Heiner Geißler. She maintained the position under his successor, Rita Süssmuth, for two years, before moving to the Federal Ministry of Education and Science under Jürgen Möllemann following the 1987 federal election. She left the office on 21 April 1989, after a cabinet reshuffle.

After the 1994 federal election, Karwatzki was again appointed Parliamentary State Secretary, this time to the Federal Ministry of Finance under Theodor Waigel. She left the office on 28 October 1998, following the 1998 federal election.

After the premature dissolution of the 15th Bundestag in 2005 following a failed motion of no confidence, Karwatzki decided to retire from politics.

== Works ==
- Benachteiligung von Mädchen ungerecht und kurzsichtig. (1978); In English: Discrimination against women is unjust and short-sighted.
- Christlich, sozial und gerecht handeln können. (1984); In English: To be able to act in a Christian, socially responsible and just manner.
- Mehr Aufmerksamkeit für Mädchen. (1984); In English: More attention towards women.
- Eine Bergtour ist selten Gipfelstürmerei. (2001); In English: Climbing a mountain is rarely about reaching the peak.

== Sources ==
- Walter Habel (ed.): Wer ist wer? Das deutsche Who’s who. (in German) 24th edition. Schmidt-Römhild, Lübeck 1985, ISBN 3-7950-2005-0 , p. 611.
