= Wolf-Michael Catenhusen =

German politician

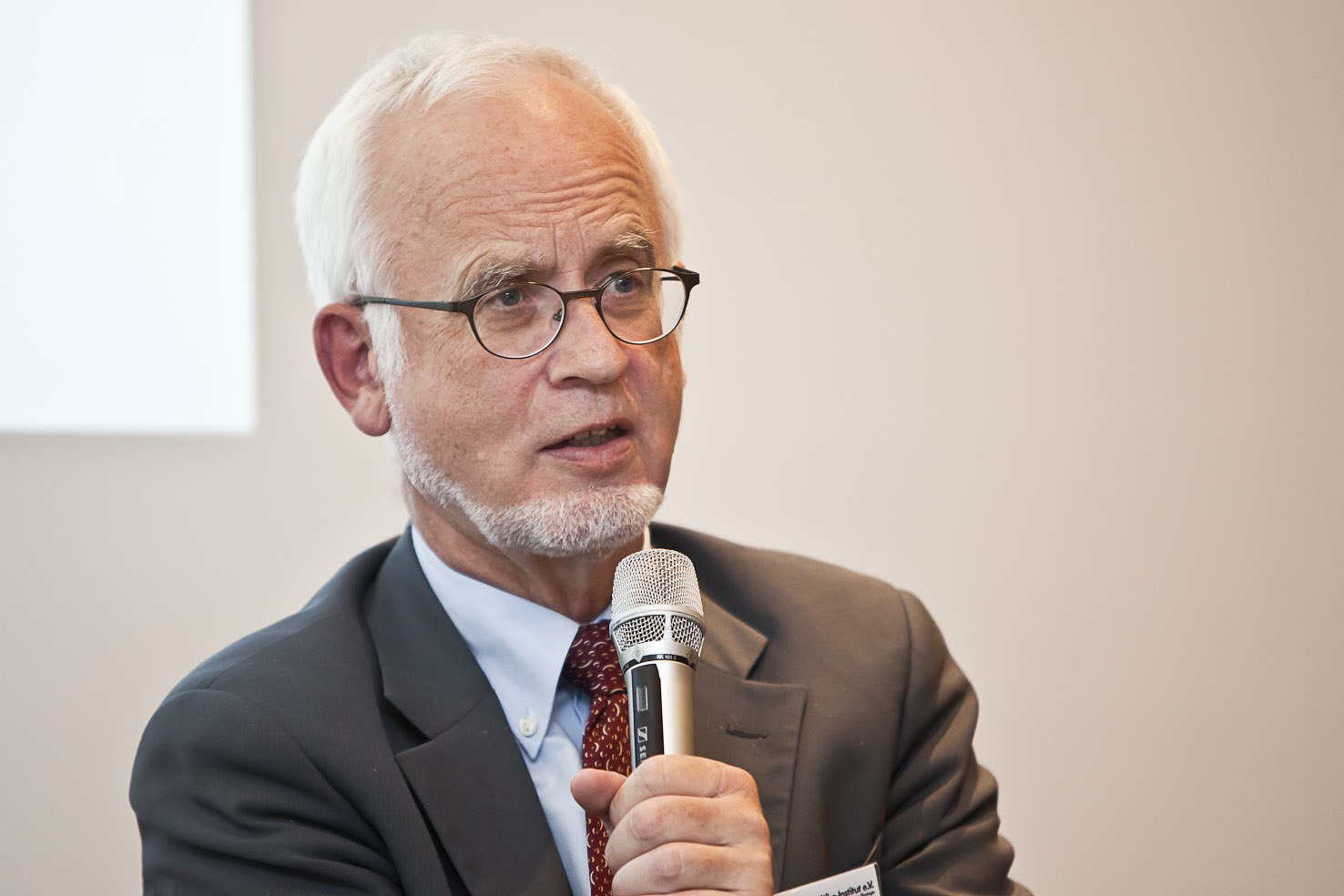
- Wolf-Michael Catenhusen, 2010

Parliamentary State Secretary at the Federal Ministry of Education and Research
- In office 27 October 1998 – 22 October 2002

State Secretary at the Federal Ministry of Education and Research
- In office 1 July 2003 – 31 December 2005

Personal details
- Born: 13 July 1945 Höxter, Germany
- Died: 30 April 2019 (aged 73) Berlin, Germany
- Party: SPD
- Children: 2
- Occupation: Politician

Wolf-Michael Catenhusen (13 July 1945, Höxter, Germany – 30 April 2019, Berlin, Germany) was a German politician from the SPD.

He served as Parliamentary State Secretary from 1998 to 2002 and as State Secretary from 2003 to 2005 at the Federal Ministry of Education and Research. Catenhusen was also the Deputy Chairman of the National Regulatory Control Council and Deputy Chairman of the German Ethics Council.

== Life and career ==
After graduating from high school in 1965, Catenhusen studied Latin, history, and social sciences in Göttingen and Münster, obtaining his first and second state examinations for teaching at grammar schools. From 1977, he worked as a teacher at the Arnoldinum Gymnasium in Burgsteinfurt.

Wolf-Michael Catenhusen was married and had two children.

He was a member of the Presidium of the German Protestant Church Congress from 1999 to 2011. He served as chairman of the advisory board for Stem Cell Research NRW.

== Political career ==
Catenhusen joined the SPD in 1968. From 1975 to 1985, he was chairman of the SPD sub-district Münster and from 1976 a member of the SPD district executive committee of Western Westphalia. From 1995 to 2003, he was also a member of the SPD Federal Executive Committee.

From 1980 to 2002, Catenhusen was a member of the German Bundestag. From 1984 to 1986, he chaired the Enquete Commission "Opportunities and Risks of Genetic Engineering" and from 1987 to 1994, he chaired the Committee on Research and Technology and Technology Assessment. From 1994 to 1998, he was Parliamentary Managing Director of the SPD Parliamentary Group.

== Public offices ==
On 27 October 1998, he was appointed Parliamentary State Secretary at the Federal Ministry of Education and Research in the government of Gerhard Schröder (Cabinet Schröder I). After the 2002 federal election, he left this office on 22 October 2002, but was appointed civil servant State Secretary at the BMBF on 1 July 2003. Following the appointment of Annette Schavan (CDU) as the new Federal Minister of Education, Catenhusen was placed on indefinite leave as of 31 December 2005.

From 2006 to early 2011, Catenhusen was chairman of the Federal Government's Nano Commission, which was based at the Federal Ministry for the Environment, Nature Conservation and Nuclear Safety. From April 2008 to 2016, he was also a member of the German Ethics Council, serving as deputy chairman from 2012.

== Literature ==
- Rudolf Vierhaus, Ludolf Herbst (eds.), Bruno Jahn (collab.): Biographisches Handbuch der Mitglieder des Deutschen Bundestages. 1949–2002. Vol. 1: A–M. K. G. Saur, Munich 2002, ISBN 3-598-23782-0, p. 122.
