= Merz cabinet =

Current government of Germany

- 25th Cabinet of the Federal Republic of Germany
- 6 May 2025 – present
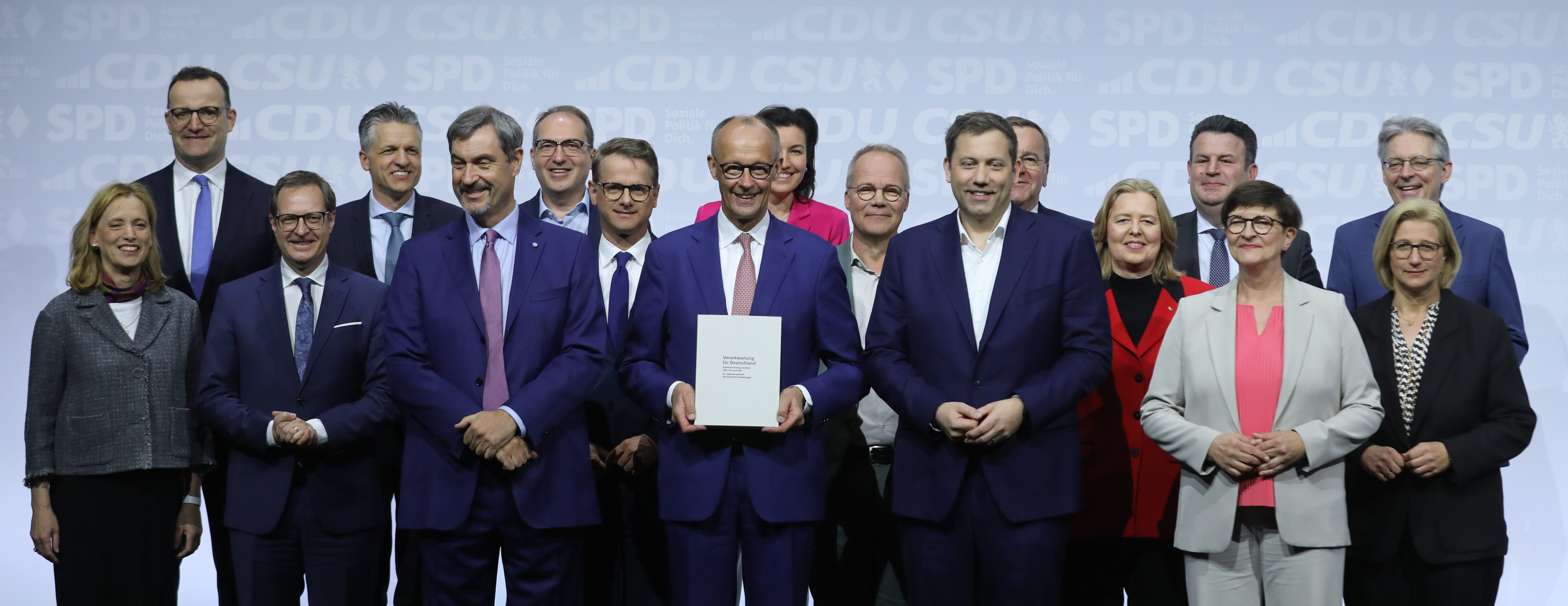
- Signing of the coalition agreement for the 21st Bundestag on 5 May 2025
- Date formed: 6 May 2025

People and organisations
- President: Frank-Walter Steinmeier
- Chancellor: Friedrich Merz
- Vice Chancellor: Lars Klingbeil
- Member parties: Christian Democratic Union; Christian Social Union; Social Democratic Party
- Status in legislature: Grand coalition
- Opposition parties: Alternative for Germany; Alliance 90/The Greens; The Left; South Schleswig Voters' Association

History
- Election: 2025 federal election
- Legislature terms: 21st Bundestag
- Predecessor: Scholz

The Merz cabinet (German: Kabinett Merz [kabiˈnɛt ˈmɛʁts]) is the 25th and current Government of the Federal Republic of Germany during the 21st legislative session of the Bundestag. It succeeded the previous cabinet led by Olaf Scholz. The cabinet is led by Friedrich Merz.

The cabinet is composed of Merz's Christian Democratic Union (CDU), its Bavarian sister-party Christian Social Union (CSU) (which form the CDU/CSU alliance; the so called Union) and the Social Democratic Party (SPD). It is the fifth time a governing coalition between Union and SPD has been formed in post-war German history and the first since the Fourth Merkel cabinet led by then-Chancellor Angela Merkel in 2018.

== Coalition formation ==
Composition of the 21st Bundestag

The Union (CDU/CSU) with its Chancellor candidate Friedrich Merz emerged from 2025 German federal election as the strongest faction in the new Bundestag. However, the CDU/CSU needed coalition partners (as is usual in German politics) in order to form a majority government. The only possibility of forming a coalition with just one other party was a coalition with the SPD. Mathematically, a two-party coalition with the AfD, which is generally considered to be on the far right, would also have been possible; however, the CDU/CSU had ruled this out before the election.

For the coalition negotiations the CDU team included Friedrich Merz and other high-ranking officials such as CSU leader Markus Söder, CDU General Secretary Carsten Linnemann and CDU parliamentary group leader Thorsten Frei, CSU parliamentary group leader Alexander Dobrindt, the Minister President of Saxony Michael Kretschmer, the deputy chairwoman of the CDU Karin Prien and CSU politician Dorothee Bär. The SPD delegation was made up of important personalities such as Defence Minister Boris Pistorius and Labour Minister Hubertus Heil, as well as the Secretary General Matthias Miersch, Bundestag President Bärbel Bas, the two Minister Presidents Manuela Schwesig and Anke Rehlinger, and the head of the SPD in North Rhine-Westphalia Achim Post.

Both sides had originally wanted the talks not to commence until 5 March, in view of the 2025 Hamburg state election on 2 March, as well as Carnival (peaking 3 March), which is very popular in some parts of Germany. Subsequently, however, Klingbeil and Merz agreed to an early start in their talks, so exploratory talks between the two parties began in Berlin on 28 February 2025, five days after the election. Merz had set himself the target of forming a coalition by Easter.

From the outset, there were differences of opinion between the CDU and SPD on the reform of the debt brake (which limited the German budget deficit to 0.35% of GDP per year), a possible tax reform, the minimum tax reform, the minimum wage, the citizen's income, immigration, and a new right to vote. On 9 April, both SPD and the CDU/CSU parliamentary groups had reached a coalition agreement to form a new cabinet under Friedrich Merz’s chancellorship. The coalition government would consist of 10 ministers from the CDU/CSU, (Note: 7 Ministers from the CDU and 3 from CSU) and 7 from SPD as per the agreement. Additionally, the Vice Chancellor would be nominated by the SPD among 7 of its ministers.

=== Chancellor election ===
The Constitution (Basic Law) requires the President of Germany to propose a Chancellor to the President of the Bundestag for approval by an absolute majority of Bundestag members. Accordingly, after the party leaders of the CDU, CSU and SPD signed their coalition agreement on 5 May, Frank-Walter Steinmeier officially proposed Friedrich Merz to Bundestag President Julia Klöckner for election as Chancellor, which was put to the vote the next day by secret ballot. Although the CDU/CSU and SPD had 328 of 630 members of the Bundestag, in the first round of voting Merz received only 310 votes, below the required 316. This is the first time this has happened in the history of the Federal Republic of Germany. After the election result was announced, the session was interrupted.

According to Article 63 (3) of the Basic Law, the election of the Chancellor was now in the second phase: within a period of 14 days, i.e. until 20 May, a quarter of the members of the Bundestag could nominate a candidate for election as Federal Chancellor. The number of ballots is not predetermined and is theoretically unlimited. If a candidate is elected in one of these ballots, the President must appoint him or her. If no new Federal Chancellor is elected within this period, a final election must be held "without delay" (unverzüglich) in accordance with Article 63 (4) of the Basic Law. If a candidate achieves the Chancellor majority, he or she must be appointed; if no candidate achieves this majority, the President must decide whether to appoint the candidate with the most votes (relative majority) or dissolve the Bundestag.

Surprised by his failure to win enough votes, Merz's coalition asked the parliament's legal department whether a second vote could be held the same day. During the adjournment of the session, the factions of the Bundestag discussed a second round of voting. All parliamentary groups agreed that the second round of voting should take place on 6 May. The CDU/CSU and SPD parliamentary groups once again put forward Friedrich Merz as their candidate. However, a resolution of the Bundestag was required for this second ballot, as the motion for the election proposal was distributed as a printed matter, which, according to the Bundestag's rules of procedure, may be dealt with no earlier than three days after its submission (Section 78 (5) GOBT). The CDU/CSU, SPD, The Greens and The Left parliamentary groups then tabled a motion that the deadline be shortened, which is permitted under Section 126 of the Standing Rules and needs a two-thirds majority to pass. The shortening of the deadline was approved unanimously. Friedrich Merz was elected in the second round of voting. He was then appointed Chancellor by Federal President Frank-Walter Steinmeier and sworn in to the Bundestag. The federal ministers were then appointed by Federal President Steinmeier and then sworn in by the Bundestag.

Berlin, 6 May 2025 – total votes: 630 – absolute majority: 316
Ballot	Candidate	Votes		Proportion	Parties
1st Ballot	Friedrich Merz (CDU)	Yes	310	49.2%	CDU/CSU; SPD
1st Ballot	Friedrich Merz (CDU)	No	307	48.7%	CDU/CSU; SPD
1st Ballot	Friedrich Merz (CDU)	Abstention	3	0.48%	CDU/CSU; SPD
1st Ballot	Friedrich Merz (CDU)	Invalid	1	0.16%	CDU/CSU; SPD
1st Ballot	Friedrich Merz (CDU)	not submitted	9	1.43%	CDU/CSU; SPD
Friedrich Merz was not elected as Chancellor of Germany.
2nd Ballot	Friedrich Merz (CDU)	Yes	325	51.6%	CDU/CSU; SPD
2nd Ballot	Friedrich Merz (CDU)	No	289	45.9%	CDU/CSU; SPD
2nd Ballot	Friedrich Merz (CDU)	Abstention	1	0.16%	CDU/CSU; SPD
2nd Ballot	Friedrich Merz (CDU)	Invalid	3	0.48%	CDU/CSU; SPD
2nd Ballot	Friedrich Merz (CDU)	not submitted	12	1.90%	CDU/CSU; SPD
Friedrich Merz was elected as Chancellor of Germany.

== Composition ==
The composition of the cabinet by the number of ministers as per the parties
Party	Ministers	Percentage
Christian Democratic Union	7	41%
Social Democratic Party	7	41%
Christian Social Union	3	18%
Total	17	100%

In addition to the chancellor, the cabinet consists of 17 ministers, 16 of whom have their own portfolio and one is Minister for Special Affairs (in order to give cabinet rank to the head of the chancellery). The total number of ministers has thus risen by one in comparison to the Scholz cabinet. The Federal Ministry for Digital and State Modernisation has been newly created as a split from the transport ministry and parts of the portfolio of the ministry for the interior and of the ministry for economic affairs. Other portfolio reshuffles includes the re-integration of climate action back into the ministry for the environment; it had been merged with economic affairs under outgoing minister Robert Habeck. The responsibility for international climate policy and climate negotiations was also transferred to the ministry for the environment from the foreign office. The responsibility for education is being merged with the portfolio of family, seniors, women and youth affairs, while the remaining ministry for research has been given the added designations of technology and astronautics.

Order	Office	Portrait	Minister	Party	Took office	Left office
1	Chancellor		Friedrich Merz	CDU	6 May 2025	Incumbent
2	Vice Chancellor		Lars Klingbeil	SPD	6 May 2025	Incumbent
2	Federal Minister of Finance		Lars Klingbeil	SPD	6 May 2025	Incumbent
3	Federal Minister of the Interior		Alexander Dobrindt	CSU	6 May 2025	Incumbent
4	Federal Minister for Foreign Affairs		Johann Wadephul	CDU	6 May 2025	Incumbent
5	Federal Minister of Defence		Boris Pistorius	SPD	19 January 2023 (renewed on 6 May 2025)	Incumbent
6	Federal Minister for Economic Affairs and Energy		Katherina Reiche	CDU	6 May 2025	Incumbent
7	Federal Minister of Research, Technology and Space		Dorothee Bär	CSU	6 May 2025	Incumbent
8	Federal Minister of Justice and Consumer Protection		Stefanie Hubig	SPD	6 May 2025	Incumbent
9	Federal Minister for Education, Family Affairs, Senior Citizens, Women and Youth		Karin Prien	CDU	6 May 2025	Incumbent
10	Federal Minister of Labour and Social Affairs		Bärbel Bas	SPD	6 May 2025	13 October 2026
10	Federal Minister of Labour and Social Affairs		Alexander Schweitzer	SPD	13 October 2026	Incumbent
11	Federal Minister for Digital Transformation and Government Modernisation		Karsten Wildberger	Ind (before 9 May 2025)	6 May 2025	Incumbent
11	Federal Minister for Digital Transformation and Government Modernisation		Karsten Wildberger	CDU (after 9 May 2025)	6 May 2025	Incumbent
12	Federal Minister for Transport		Patrick Schnieder	CDU	6 May 2025	29 July 2026
12	Federal Minister for Transport		Steffen Bilger	CDU	29 July 2026	Incumbent
13	Federal Minister for the Environment, Climate Action, Nature Conservation and Nuclear Safety		Carsten Schneider	SPD	6 May 2025	Incumbent
14	Federal Minister of Health		Nina Warken	CDU	6 May 2025	29 July 2026
14	Federal Minister of Health		Carsten Linnemann	CDU	29 July 2026	Incumbent
15	Federal Minister of Agriculture, Food and Regional Identity		Alois Rainer	CSU	6 May 2025	Incumbent
16	Federal Minister for Economic Cooperation and Development		Reem Alabali-Radovan	SPD	6 May 2025	Incumbent
17	Federal Minister for Housing, Urban Development and Building		Verena Hubertz	SPD	6 May 2025	Incumbent
18	Federal Minister for Special Affairs Head of the Chancellery		Thorsten Frei	CDU	6 May 2025	29 July 2026
18	Federal Minister for Special Affairs Head of the Chancellery		Nina Warken	CDU	29 July 2026	Incumbent

== 2026 crisis ==
In July 2026 a personnel scandal involving Union parliamentary leader Jens Spahn and a poorly handled cabinet reshuffle produced the first open talk of replacing Merz only 14 months into his chancellorship.

After the 2026 Saxony-Anhalt state election on 6 September, in which the far-right Alternative for Germany (AfD) won 43.8 percent of the party-list vote, while the CDU fell to 17.2 percent, Merz, his party and cabinet were again placed under scrutiny. Merz admitted his personal unpopularity was as a factor in the historic defeat.

An INSA survey from 12 September 2026 found that 14 percent of respondents in Germany regarded Friedrich Merz as the right chancellor and 78 percent did not, including a majority of Union voters.

By mid-September 2026, German media spoke of a Kanzlerkrise (chancellor crisis), Kanzlerdämmerung (chancellor twilight) or a Kanzlertausch (chancellor swap) in favour of North Rhine-Westphalia minister-president Hendrik Wüst or Bavarian minister-president Markus Söder.
