= Federal Ministry for Digital Transformation and Government Modernisation =

Federal ministry of the Federal Republic of Germany

Federal Ministry for Digital Transformation and Government Modernisation (BMDS)
- Bundesministerium für Digitales und Staatsmodernisierung

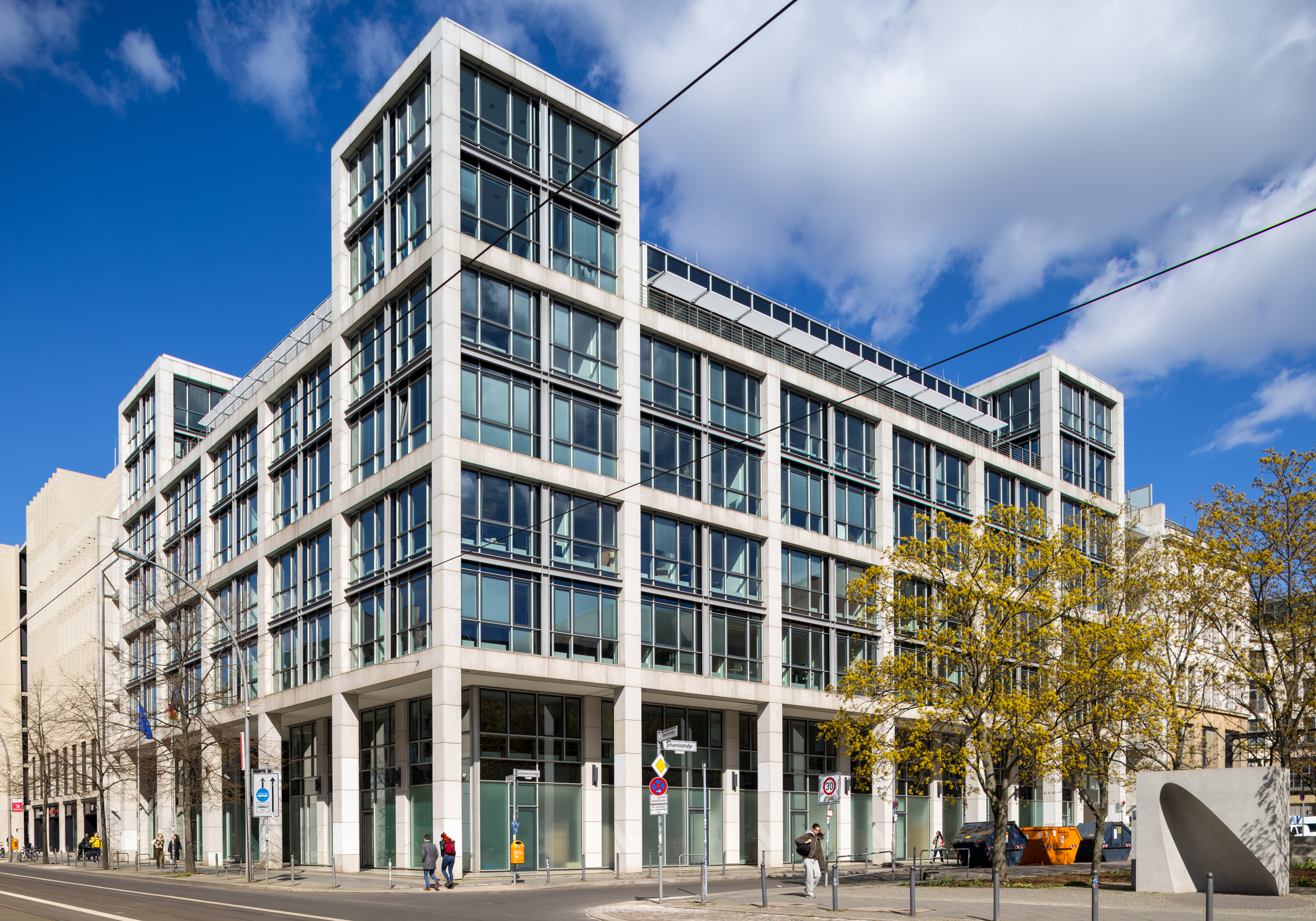
- Head office at Friedrichstraße 108 in Berlin

Agency overview
- Formed: 6 May 2025 (15 months ago)
- Jurisdiction: Government of Germany
- Headquarters: Friedrichstraße 108, 10117 Berlin, Germany; 52.524688°N 13.388101°E
- Minister responsible: Karsten Wildberger
- Website: www.bmds.bund.de

The Federal Ministry for Digital Transformation and Government Modernisation (German: Bundesministerium für Digitales und Staatsmodernisierung) (BMDS) is a federal ministry of the Federal Republic of Germany.

== History ==
The creation of a Department for Digital Transformation and Government Modernisation in the Merz cabinet was agreed upon in the coalition agreement for the 21st legislative period of the German Bundestag. The ministry will be headed by the Christian Democratic Union of Germany (CDU). The creation was an election promise of Friedrich Merz. Karsten Wildberger (independent) was announced as the first designated minister on April 28, 2025.

The ministry was established on May 6, 2025, by the Federal Chancellor's organizational decree and has been under construction ever since. The first building was located at Englische Straße 30 in Berlin-Charlottenburg. Now the office building is located at Friedrichstraße 108 in Berlin-Mitte. By virtue of the organizational decree, the ministry receives extensive powers and responsibilities from the portfolios of several federal ministries and the Federal Chancellery. The ministry also receives a reservation of approval for all "essential" IT expenditures of the direct federal administration with the exception of defense, security and police tasks, the Federal Intelligence Service and the tax administration. Many stakeholders from the IT industry welcome the creation of the ministry.

== Tasks ==
The ministry is responsible for the digital transformation and modernisation of the state at the federal level. The former task was previously assumed by the then Federal Ministry of the Interior and Home Affairs and the then Federal Ministry for Digital Affairs and Transport, whereas no department has yet been jointly responsible for the latter. The ministry assumes key tasks such as the development of an interoperable and European-compatible so-called Germany Stack – key digital technologies and infrastructures that improve Germany's position on global markets and strengthen its technological independence – the comprehensive use of automation and artificial intelligence in government, and the promotion of broadband and fiber optic expansion. Upon the formation of his cabinet, chancelor Friedrich Merz issued an order that transfers partial responsibilities and tasks from six different ministries to the newly formed ministry.
