= Alexander Dobrindt =

German politician (born 1970)

Alexander Dobrindt MdB
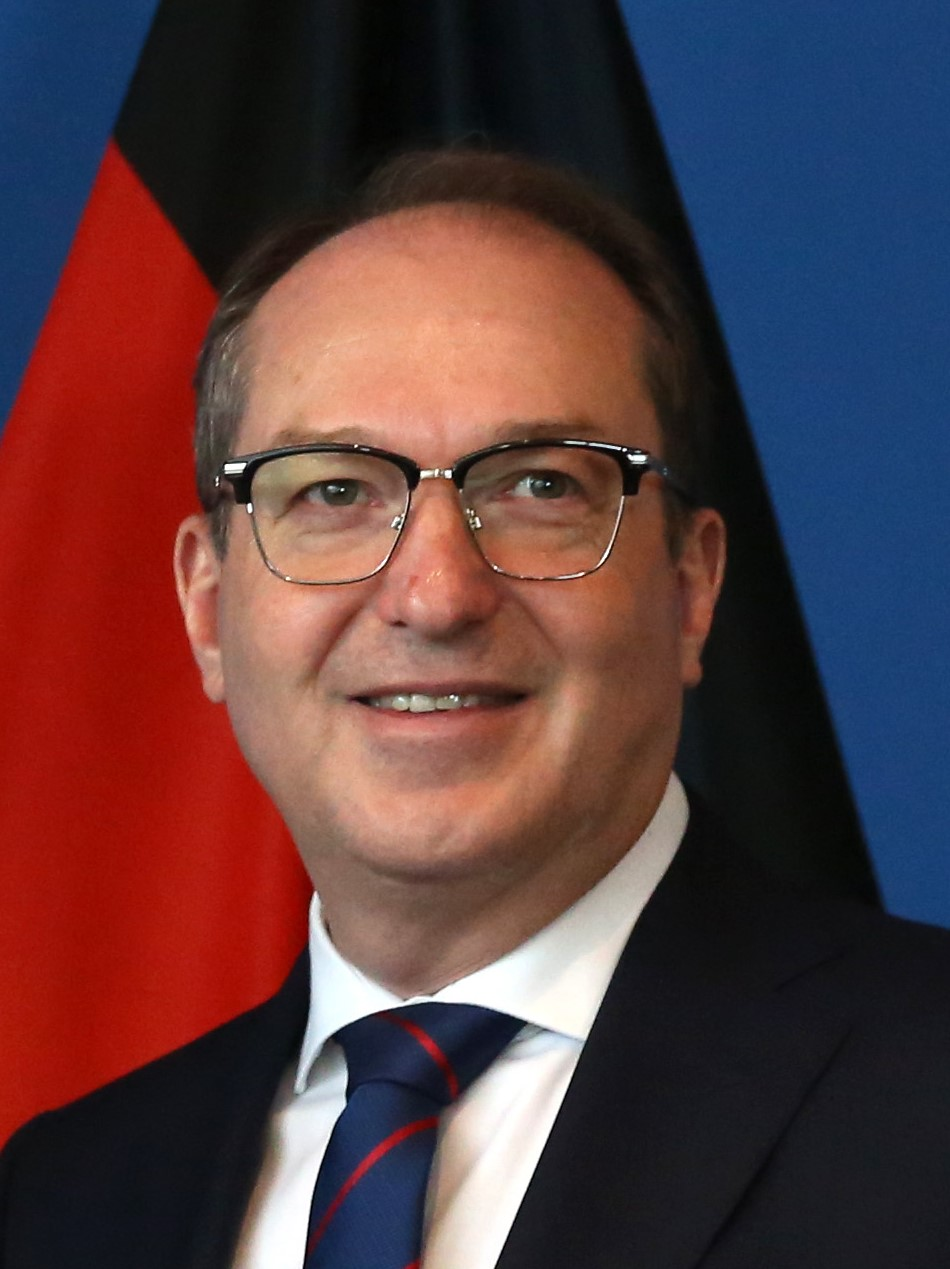
- Dobrindt in 2025

Minister of the Interior
- Incumbent
- Assumed office 6 May 2025
- Chancellor: Friedrich Merz
- Preceded by: Nancy Faeser (as Minister of the Interior and Community)

Chairman of the CSU Group in the Bundestag
- In office 24 October 2017 – 5 May 2025
- Leader: Volker Kauder; Ralph Brinkhaus; Friedrich Merz
- Preceded by: Gerda Hasselfeldt
- Succeeded by: Alexander Hoffmann

Minister of Transport and Digital Infrastructure
- In office 17 December 2013 – 24 October 2017
- Chancellor: Angela Merkel
- Preceded by: Peter Ramsauer
- Succeeded by: Christian Schmidt (acting); Andreas Scheuer

General Secretary of the Christian Social Union
- In office 9 February 2009 – 15 December 2013
- Leader: Horst Seehofer
- Preceded by: Karl-Theodor zu Guttenberg
- Succeeded by: Andreas Scheuer

Member of the Bundestag; for Weilheim
- Incumbent
- Assumed office 17 October 2002
- Preceded by: Matthäus Strebl

Personal details
- Born: 7 June 1970 (age 56) Peißenberg, Bavaria, West Germany
- Party: Christian Social Union (since 1990)
- Children: 1
- Education: LMU Munich
- Website: alexander-dobrindt.de

Alexander Dobrindt (German: [alɛkˈsandɐ ˈdoːbʁɪnt]; born 7 June 1970) is a German politician of the Christian Social Union in Bavaria (CSU) who has been serving as the Federal Minister of the Interior in the government of Chancellor Friedrich Merz since 2025.

From 2017 to 2025, Dobrindt served as the chairman of the CSU Parliamentary Group in the German Bundestag. Between 2013 and 2017, he served as Federal Minister of Transport and Digital Infrastructure in the government of Chancellor Angela Merkel. Previously, he was the secretary general of the Christian Social Union of Bavaria under the leadership of party chairman Horst Seehofer from 2009.

== Early life ==
Dobrindt was born in Peißenberg, Bavaria. He graduated from the Weilheim Highschool in 1989 and continued his studies at LMU Munich, finishing with a Master of Arts in sociology in 1995.

After obtaining his degree, Dobrindt worked at an engineering company as a financial director from 1996 to 2001 and as a managing director from 2001 to 2005.

== Political career ==
Dobrindt joined the Junge Union (Junior party of the C.S.U.) in 1986 and 4 years later the Christian Social Union of Bavaria. He has been a member of the German National Parliament (Bundestag) since the 2002 federal elections when he won the direct mandate in the Parliamentary Constituency of Weilheim with 59.4 percent of the votes. Since 2009, he serves as the district-chairman of the CSU in Weilheim-Schongau.

In parliament, Dobrindt served as a member of the Committee on Economic Affairs and Technology between 2005 and 2009. In the negotiations to form a coalition government following the 2013 elections, he was part of the 15-member leadership circle chaired by Merkel, Seehofer and Sigmar Gabriel.

In his capacity as minister, Dobrindt introduced a controversial road toll which forces foreign car drivers to pay up to 130 euros a year for using Germany's Autobahn motorways; the toll was a pet project of his CSU party. He was also in charge of drafting the government's plan to spend almost 270 billion euros (£226.48 billion) to repair and build new roads, railway lines and waterways between 2017 and 2030.

From late 2016, Dobrindt was a member of the German government's cabinet committee on Brexit at which ministers discuss organizational and structural issues related to the United Kingdom's departure from the European Union.

Following the 2017 elections, Dobrindt succeeded Gerda Hasselfeldt as head of the Bundestag group of CSU parliamentarians within the joint CDU/CSU group led by Friedrich Merz.

=== Minister for the Interior (since 2025) ===
On 6 May 2025, Dobrindt was sworn in as Federal Interior Minister alongside the Merz cabinet. The following day, he ordered the pushback of illegal immigrants at the German border. On 13 May, Dobrindt announced a ban on the far-right "Kingdom of Germany" (German: "Königreich Deutschland e.V.") association, which had been stockpiling weapons and had been acting increasingly hostile towards Germany's democratic system. Three members of the association were arrested, among them was its founder, Peter Fitzek. On his visit to Israel and the city of Bat Yam, reviewing the sites where Iranian missiles struck he was quoted saying: "There is no justification for attacks on a civilian population, as occurred here."

In August 2025, Dobrindt and the Federal Ministry of the Interior opposed proposals by several German mayors seeking federal support to admit and provide medical treatment for traumatized or seriously ill children from the Gaza Strip.

On 6 June 2025, Michael O'Flaherty, the Council of Europe Commissioner for Human Rights, expressed serious concerns in a letter to Dobrindt regarding the conduct of German authorities during Gaza war protests. O'Flaherty stated that

Since February 2025, Berlin authorities have imposed restrictions on the use of the Arabic language and cultural symbols during protests. In certain instances, such as the demonstration held on 15 May 2025 [in Berlin], marches were limited to static gatherings. Additionally, protestors have reportedly been subjected to intrusive surveillance—both online and in person—and arbitrary police checks.

— Council of Europe Commissioner for Human Rights, Letter to the German Federal Minister of the Interior

In 2025, Dobrindt announced that he wanted to hold talks with terrorist-Islamic Taliban in Afghanistan in order to make it easier to deport criminals with Afghan passports from Germany to Afghanistan.

In October 2025, Dobrindt announced that he wanted to deport criminals with Syrian passports from Germany to Syria.

In June 2026, Dobrindt supported reviewing the European Union's migration policy, expressing doubts about extending the Temporary Protection Directive, an EU emergency mechanism granting immediate collective protection to displaced persons, to newly arriving Ukrainian refugees of conscription age. He advocated instead for standard, case-by-case asylum procedures, arguing that restricting automatic residency rights for Ukrainian men aged 23 to 60 was necessary to avoid undermining Kyiv's mobilization capacity amidst the ongoing Ukrainian conscription crisis.

== Other activities ==
=== Corporate boards ===
- KfW, Ex-Officio Member of the Supervisory Board (2014–2017)

=== Non-profit organizations ===
- ZDF, Member of the Television Board (2009–2014)
- Akademie für Politische Bildung Tutzing, Member of the Advisory Board
- Deutsches Museum, Member of the Board of Trustees

== Political positions ==
In 2013, Dobrindt called LGBTQ people a "shrill minority" which adopted an odd lifestyle. In June 2017, he voted against introduction of same-sex marriage in Germany.

== Personal life ==
Dobrindt is a Roman Catholic, was married in Torri del Benaco, Italy in 2009, and has one son.

== See also ==
- List of Bavarian Christian Social Union politicians
- Christian Social Union of Bavaria
