= Karsten Wildberger =

German politician (born 1969)

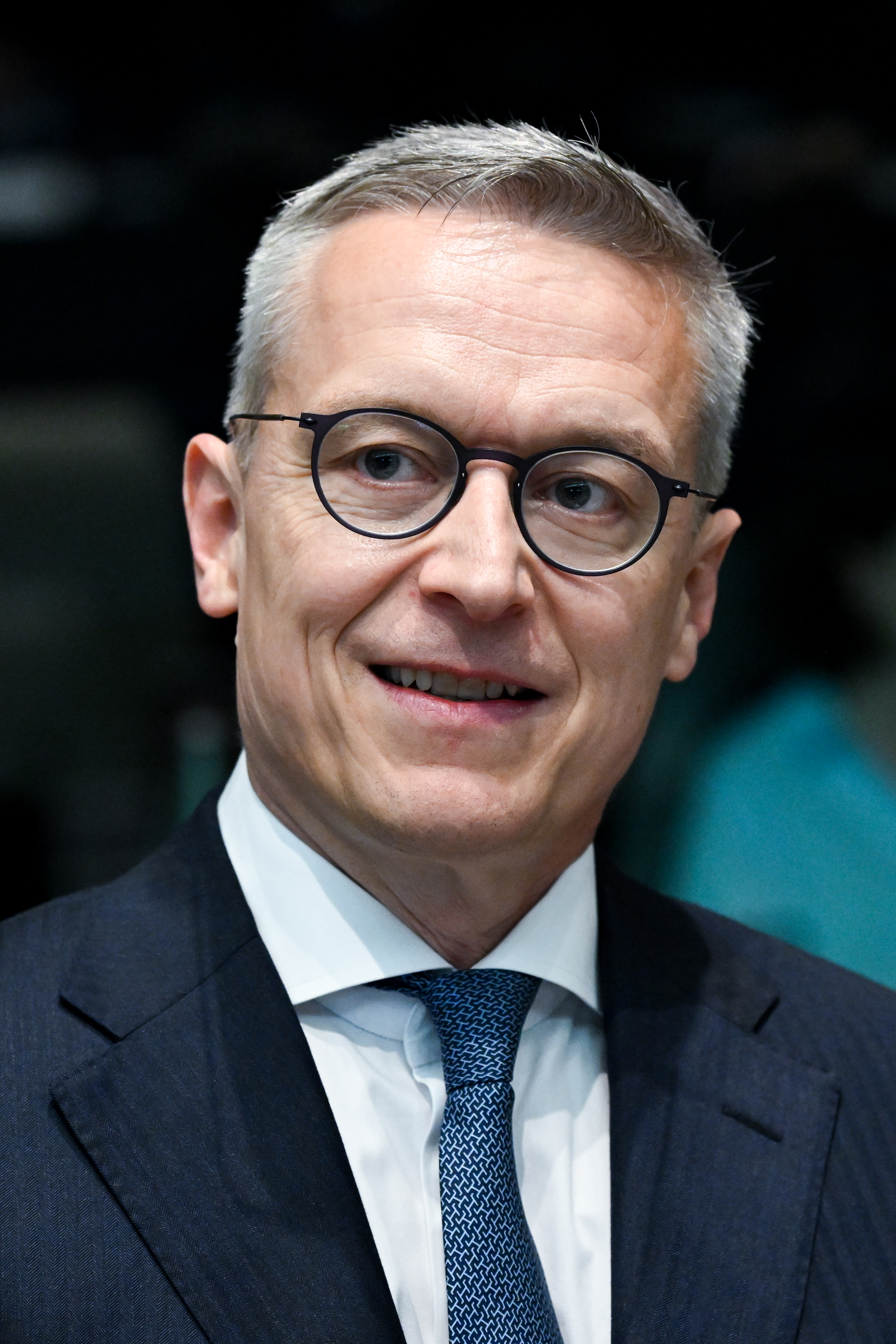
- Wildberger in 2025

Minister for Digital Transformation and Government Modernisation
- Incumbent
- Assumed office 6 May 2025
- Chancellor: Friedrich Merz
- Preceded by: Volker Wissing (as Minister of Digital and Transport)

CEO of Ceconomy
- In office 1 August 2021 – 5 May 2025
- Preceded by: Bernhard Düttmann
- Succeeded by: Christoph Vilanek

Personal details
- Born: 5 September 1969 (age 57) Giessen, Hesse, West Germany
- Party: CDU (since 2025)
- Other political affiliations: Independent (before 2025)
- Education: Technical University of Munich; RWTH Aachen University; INSEAD

Karsten Wildberger (born 5 September 1969) is a German business executive who has been serving as Federal Minister for Digital Transformation and Government Modernisation in the government of Chancellor Friedrich Merz since 2025. From 2021 to 2025, he served as CEO of Ceconomy.

== Education ==
From 1989 to 1995, Wildberger studied physics at the Technical University of Munich and RWTH Aachen, where he completed a doctorate in theoretical solid-state and computational physics. His research involved developing new computational methods to accurately calculate the properties of large, layered metal structures and exploring the field of giant magnetoresistance. He later obtained an MBA from INSEAD in 2000.

== Career ==
=== Early career ===
From 1998 to 2003, Wildberger worked as a management consultant at the Boston Consulting Group. He subsequently held international leadership roles in the telecommunications industry at T-Mobile, Vodafone plc, and Telstra Group Limited.

=== Telstra ===
As a member of Telstra's executive board from 2013 to 2016, Wildberger was responsible for Telstra's consumer and business segments, product development, retail and service operations, and the company's digital transformation, Telstra Digital. He was also a director of the Telstra Foundation. Wildberger oversaw the launch of several strategic products and services, such as Telstra Air, Australia's largest Wi-Fi Network, and Telstra TV, a streaming platform. During his tenure, Telstra also introduced its Discovery Store concept with interactive technology and personalized services.

=== EON ===
From 2016 to 2021, Wildberger served on the Board of Management of E.ON SE, responsible for E.ON’s Customer Business Unit and IT, overseeing Energy Management, Decentralized Energy Solutions, E-Mobility, Innovation, Brand and Marketing, IT, and E.ON’s digital transformation. He was also responsible for Retail and Customer Solutions across 15 markets, serving 50 million customers. During Wildberger's tenure, E.ON launched E.ON Home in 2019, an energy management system developed in collaboration with Microsoft. This platform integrated diverse home energy applications—including rooftop solar panels, electric vehicle (EV) chargers, and battery storage—into a unified digital interface. Wildberger also oversaw the creation E.ON Next in 2020, a UK strategic energy subsidiary developed in collaboration with Kraken Technologies (a subsidiary of Octopus Energy). The venture focused on sustainability, customer service and operational efficiency, powered by digital solutions. Additionally, he expanded E.ON’s collaboration with RWTH Aachen University, funding projects in energy system analysis, smart grids, storage, efficiency, electrification, and digitalization.

=== MediaMarkt Saturn ===
From August 1, 2021 to May 5, 2025, Wildberger was CEO of Ceconomy AG and its subsidiary, MediaMarktSaturn Retail Group. His tenure focused on addressing post-pandemic challenges, resolving a governance dispute among stakeholders and implementing a new strategic direction for the company. In May 2022, Wildberger introduced a strategy aimed at enhancing customer experience, developing omnichannel operations, and diversifying the company's business model. Under Wildberger, the company repositioned itself as an omnichannel service platform and expanded into new areas such as a third-party marketplace and retail media services. Wildberger also directed efforts to modernize stores with new formats and broaden the company's service offerings.

Since 6 May 2025, Wildberger has been Germany's first-ever Federal Minister for Digital Transformation and Government Modernisation.

== Other roles and affiliations ==
Wildberger was a member of the Supervisory Board of Forschungszentrum Jülich and sat on the advisory board of the Aachener Ingenieurpreis. Additionally, he served as Vice President and member of the Presidium of the Wirtschaftsrates der CDU, one of Germany’s largest business interest groups, advocating for the principles of the social market economy.
