= Parliamentary State Secretary =

Member of the Bundestag

A Parliamentary State Secretary (Parlamentarischer Staatssekretär, PStS) is a member of the Bundestag given a portfolio to assist a Minister with running a government ministry. The position is roughly analogous to deputy ministers.

The position was first introduced in 1967 to help younger politicians gain experience for future ministerial roles. In 2021, there were 36 parliamentary state secretaries in the Merkel IV Cabinet.

== See also ==
- Parliamentary secretary, a similar position in several Westminster-style systems of government
- Parliamentary Under-Secretary of State or Parliamentary Private Secretary, similar positions in the United Kingdom
