= Hertrich =

Hertrich is a German surname. Notable people with the surname include:

- Rainer Hertrich (born 1949), German businessman
- Stefan Hertrich (born 1976), German singer and musician

== See also ==
- Herdrich
