= Head of the Federal Chancellery of Germany =

List of people serving as head of the German Chancellery

Head of the Chancellery
- Chefin des Bundeskanzleramtes (German)

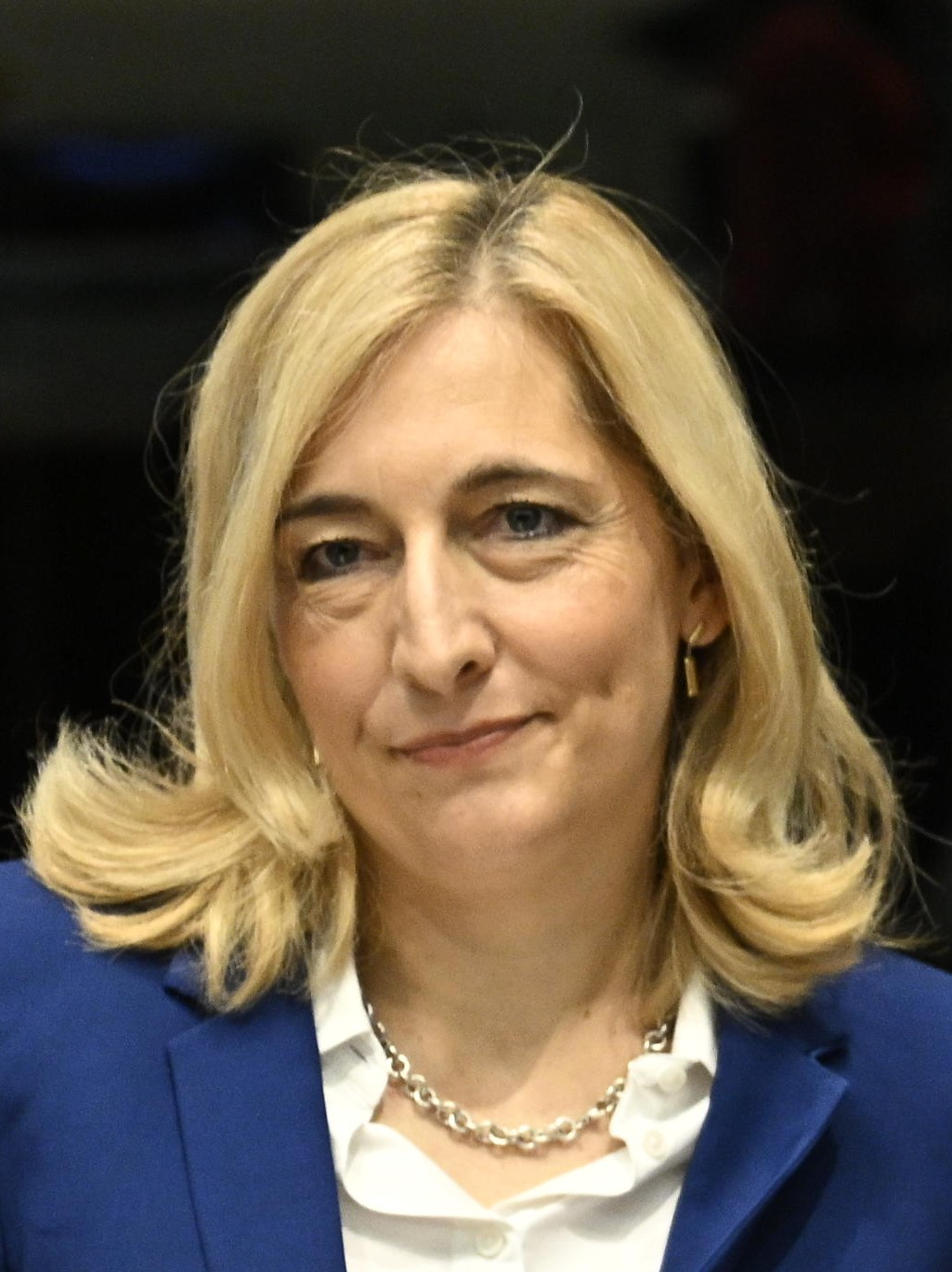
- Incumbent; Nina Warken since 29 July 2026
- German Chancellery
- Abbreviation: ChefBK
- Member of: Cabinet
- Reports to: Chancellor of Germany
- Appointer: Chancellor
- Precursor: Chief of the Reich Chancellery
- Formation: 12 October 1949
- First holder: Franz-Josef Wuermeling
- Website: Official website

The Head of the Chancellery (German: Chef des Bundeskanzleramtes, abbreviated ChefBK) is the highest ranking official of the German Chancellery and the principal assistant of the Chancellor of Germany. The Chief of Staff is in charge of the running of the German Chancellery as well as with coordinating the federal government's work. The Chief of Staff is either a member of the federal cabinet with the rank of Federal Minister for Special Affairs or holds the rank of Secretary of State. All Chiefs of Staff since 2005 have been members of the federal cabinet.

== List of the heads of the Federal Chancellery ==
No.	Portrait	Name (born–died)	Term of office			Political party	Rank
No.	Portrait	Name (born–died)	Took office	Left office	Time in office	Political party	Rank
1		Franz-Josef Wuermeling (1900–1986)	12 October 1949	14 January 1951	1 year, 94 days	CDU	Secretary of State
2		Walter Hallstein (1901–1982)	17 October 1949	1 March 1950	135 days	CDU	Secretary of State
3		Otto Lenz (1903–1957)	15 January 1951	19 September 1953	2 years, 247 days	CDU	Secretary of State
4		Hans Globke (1898–1973)	28 October 1953	15 October 1963	9 years, 352 days	CDU	Secretary of State
5		Ludger Westrick (1894–1990)	17 October 1963	16 June 1964	243 days	CDU	Secretary of State
5		Ludger Westrick (1894–1990)	16 June 1964	30 November 1966	2 years, 167 days	CDU	Federal Minister
6		Werner Knieper (1909–1977)	1 December 1966	31 December 1967	1 year, 30 days	CDU	Secretary of State
7		Karl Carstens (1914–1992)	1 January 1968	22 October 1969	1 year, 294 days	CDU	Secretary of State
8		Horst Ehmke (1927–2017)	22 October 1969	18 December 1972	3 years, 57 days	SPD	Federal Minister
9		Horst Grabert (1927–2011)	18 December 1972	15 May 1974	1 year, 148 days	SPD	Secretary of State
10		Manfred Schüler (1932–2025)	16 May 1974	1 December 1980	6 years, 199 days	SPD	Secretary of State
11		Manfred Lahnstein (born 1937)	1 December 1980	28 April 1982	1 year, 148 days	SPD	Secretary of State
12		Gerhard Konow (1929–1997)	29 April 1982	4 October 1982	159 days	CDU	Secretary of State
13		Waldemar Schreckenberger (1929–2017)	4 October 1982	15 November 1984	2 years, 42 days	CDU	Secretary of State
14		Wolfgang Schäuble (1942–2023)	15 November 1984	20 April 1989	4 years, 156 days	CDU	Federal Minister
15		Rudolf Seiters (born 1937)	21 April 1989	25 November 1991	2 years, 218 days	CDU	Federal Minister
16		Friedrich Bohl (born 1945)	26 November 1991	27 October 1998	6 years, 335 days	CDU	Federal Minister
17		Bodo Hombach (born 1952)	27 October 1998	7 July 1999	253 days	SPD	Federal Minister
18		Frank-Walter Steinmeier (born 1956)	7 July 1999	22 November 2005	6 years, 138 days	SPD	Secretary of State
19		Thomas de Maizière (born 1954)	22 November 2005	28 October 2009	3 years, 340 days	CDU	Federal Minister
20		Ronald Pofalla (born 1959)	28 October 2009	17 December 2013	4 years, 50 days	CDU	Federal Minister
21		Peter Altmaier (born 1958)	17 December 2013	14 March 2018	4 years, 87 days	CDU	Federal Minister
22		Helge Braun (born 1972)	14 March 2018	8 December 2021	3 years, 269 days	CDU	Federal Minister
23		Wolfgang Schmidt (born 1970)	8 December 2021	6 May 2025	3 years, 149 days	SPD	Federal Minister
24		Thorsten Frei (born 1973)	6 May 2025	29 July 2026	1 year, 155 days	CDU	Federal Minister
25		Nina Warken (born 1979)	29 July 2026	Incumbent		CDU	Federal Minister
