= Konow =

Konow is a surname. Notable people with the surname include:

- Agnes von Konow (1868–1944), Finnish animal rights advocate
- Fredrik Ludvig Konow (1864–1954), Norwegian businessman
- Friedrich Wilhelm Konow (1842–1908), German entomologist, specialising in Hymenoptera
- Gerhard Konow (1929–1997), German politician
- Henri Konow (1862–1939), Danish admiral
- Karsten Konow (1918–1945), Norwegian Olympic sailor 1936
- Magnus Konow (1887–1972), Norwegian Olympic sailor 1908–1948
- Sten Konow (1867–1948), Norwegian Indologist
- Thomas Konow (1796–1881), Norwegian naval officer
- Wollert Konow (Hedemarken politician)
- Wollert Konow (merchant)
- Wollert Konow (prime minister) (1845–1924), Prime Minister of Norway 1910–1912
