= Dorothee Schlegel =

German politician

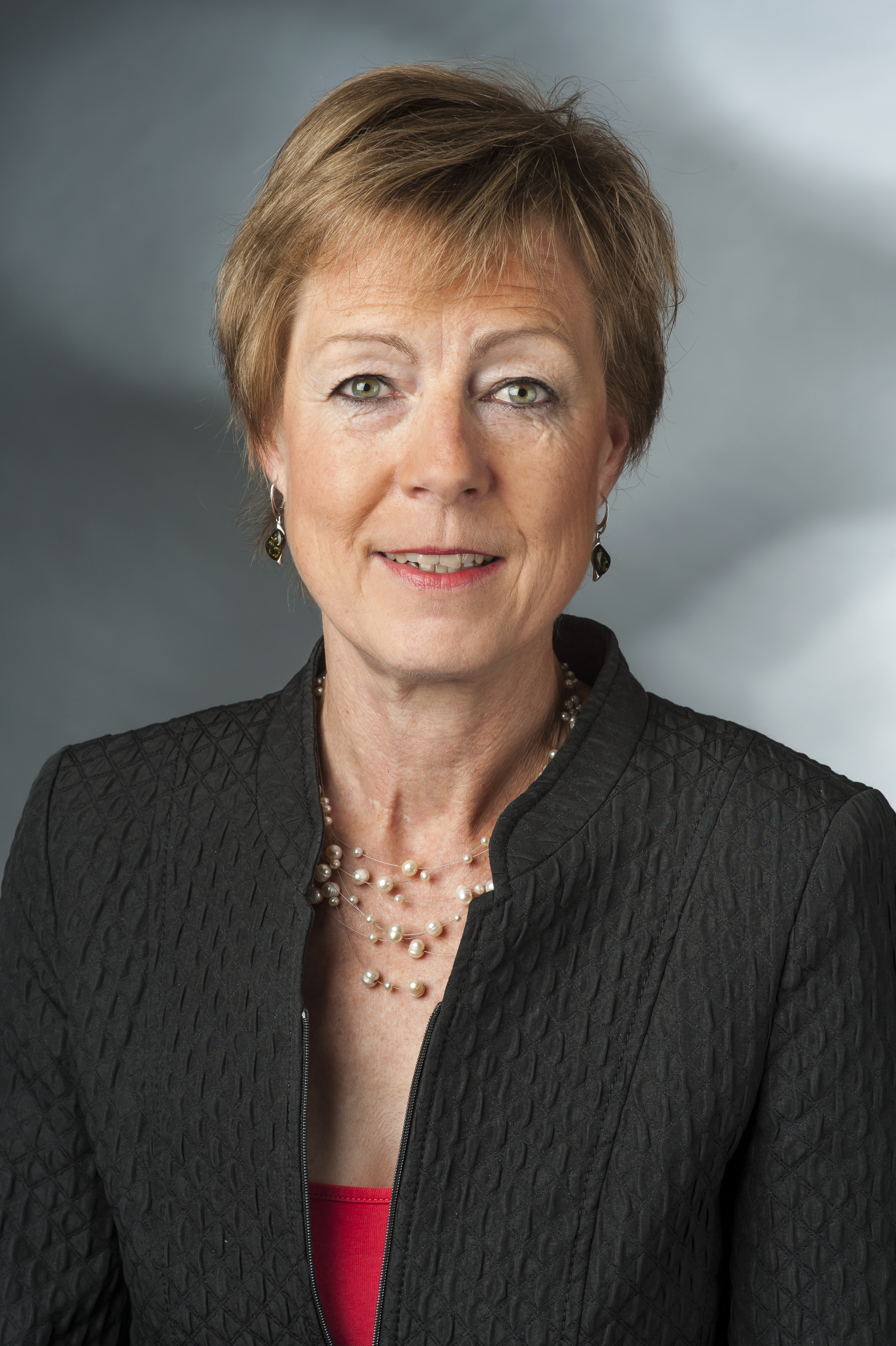
- Dorothee Schlegel in 2014

Member of the Bundestag
- In office 2013–2017
- Constituency: Baden-Württemberg

Personal details
- Born: 27 April 1959 (age 66) Kernen, West Germany
- Party: SPD

Dorothee Schlegel (born 27 April 1959 in Rommelshausen (today a district of Kernen im Remstal) is a German politician from the Social Democratic Party of Germany (SPD). She was a member of the Bundestag from 2013 to 2017.

== Life ==
Schlegel completed training as a Protestant religious education teacher and deacon at the Protestant University of Applied Sciences in Ludwigsburg. She worked as a deacon and religious education teacher in Stuttgart. From 1992 to 1997, she studied linguistics and sociology at the University of Stuttgart. In 2004, she received her doctorate in linguistics from the University of Mannheim with a dissertation on tenses in spoken language. She was a consultant at the Turkish Consulate General in Stuttgart, a lecturer at several universities, and from 2006 onwards, she worked for Frank Mentrup. She has also been a volunteer preacher since 2008 and chairwoman of the Mosbach Sports Association since 2010. Schlegel is a member of the advisory board of the Stuttgart-Filder Care Association, which she co-founded in 1992.

== Political career ==
Dorothee Schlegel has been a member of the Social Democratic Party of Germany (SPD) since 2001. In Billigheim, where she now lives with her husband, she ran for mayor in 2009, but with 37.9% of the vote in the second round, she came in second behind the incumbent Reinhold Berberich (43.6%). In the 2010 mayoral election in neighbouring Neckargerach, she also came in second with 45.4% of the vote in the second round, behind the CDU candidate Norman Link (54.1%).

Since 2009 she has been a member of the district council inNeckar-Odenwald-Kreises.

In the 2013 and 2017 federal elections, she ran in the Odenwald – Tauber constituency and on the SPD's Baden-Württemberg state list. While she lost in both constituencies to Christian Democratic Union (CDU) candidate Alois Gerig, she was elected to the Bundestag via the state list in 2013. There, she served on the Committee on Family, Senior Citizens, Women and Youth and the Committee on European Union Affairs. In 2017, however, her position on the list was not sufficient for re-election to parliament.

Schlegel ran in the 2021 Baden-Württemberg state election in the Neckar-Odenwald constituency, but failed to enter the Landtag of Baden-Württemberg.

== Publications ==
- Alles hat seine Zeiten. Zeiten zu sprechen – Zeiten zu schreiben. 2004, ISBN 3-631-53107-9 (zugl. Diss. Univ. Mannheim 2004).
