= Wolfgang Schäuble =

German politician (1942–2023)

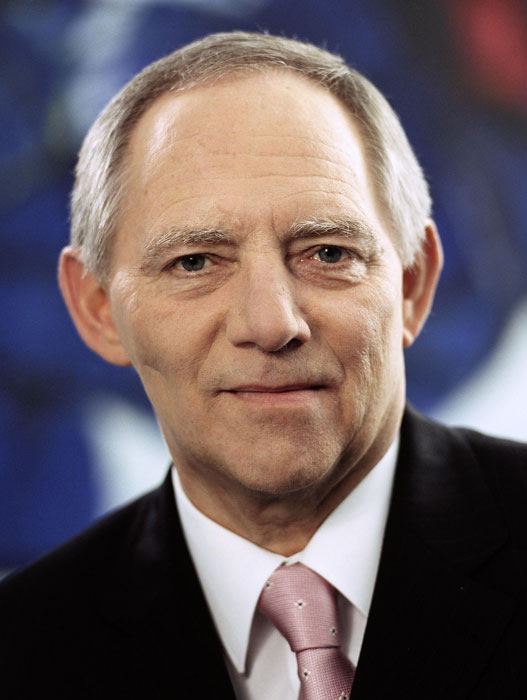
- Schäuble in 2006

President by right of age of the Bundestag
- In office 1 June 2017 – 26 December 2023
- Preceded by: Heinz Riesenhuber
- Succeeded by: Peter Ramsauer

President of the Bundestag
- In office 24 October 2017 – 26 October 2021
- Preceded by: Norbert Lammert
- Succeeded by: Bärbel Bas

Minister of Finance
- In office 28 October 2009 – 24 October 2017
- Chancellor: Angela Merkel
- Preceded by: Peer Steinbrück
- Succeeded by: Peter Altmaier (acting); Olaf Scholz

Minister of the Interior
- In office 22 November 2005 – 27 October 2009
- Chancellor: Angela Merkel
- Preceded by: Otto Schily
- Succeeded by: Thomas de Maizière
- In office 21 April 1989 – 26 November 1991
- Chancellor: Helmut Kohl
- Preceded by: Friedrich Zimmermann
- Succeeded by: Rudolf Seiters

Leader of the Christian Democratic Union
- In office 7 November 1998 – 16 February 2000
- General Secretary: Angela Merkel
- Preceded by: Helmut Kohl
- Succeeded by: Angela Merkel

Leader of the Opposition
- In office 27 October 1998 – 29 February 2000
- Chancellor: Gerhard Schröder
- Preceded by: Rudolf Scharping
- Succeeded by: Friedrich Merz

Leader of the CDU/CSU group in the Bundestag
- In office 25 November 1991 – 29 February 2000
- First Deputy: Wolfgang Bötsch; Michael Glos
- Chief Whip: Jürgen Rüttgers; Joachim Hörster; Hans-Peter Repnik
- Preceded by: Alfred Dregger
- Succeeded by: Friedrich Merz

Head of the Chancellery; Minister for Special Affairs
- In office 15 November 1984 – 21 April 1989
- Chancellor: Helmut Kohl
- Preceded by: Waldemar Schreckenberger (as secretary of state)
- Succeeded by: Rudolf Seiters

Chief Whip of the CDU/CSU group in the Bundestag
- In office 4 October 1982 – 15 November 1984
- Leader: Alfred Dregger
- Preceded by: Philipp Jenninger
- Succeeded by: Rudolf Seiters

Whip of the CDU/CSU group in the Bundestag
- In office 23 June 1981 – 4 October 1982 Serving with: Wolfgang Bötsch; Wilhelm Rawe; Dorothee Wilms
- Leader: Helmut Kohl
- Chief Whip: Philipp Jenninger
- Preceded by: Gerhard Kunz
- Succeeded by: Rudolf Seiters; Agnes Hürland-Büning

Member of the Bundestag; for Offenburg
- In office 13 December 1972 – 26 December 2023
- Preceded by: Hans Furler
- Succeeded by: Stefan Kaufmann

Personal details
- Born: 18 September 1942 Freiburg im Breisgau, Germany
- Died: 26 December 2023 (aged 81) Offenburg, Germany
- Party: Christian Democratic Union
- Spouse: Ingeborg Hensle (m. 1969)
- Children: 4
- Education: University of Freiburg; University of Hamburg
- Occupation: Civil servant; lawyer; politician
- Website: Official website (in German)

Wolfgang Schäuble (German pronunciation: [ˈvɔlfɡaŋ ˈʃɔʏblə]; 18 September 1942 – 26 December 2023) was a German politician whose political career spanned more than five decades. A member of the Christian Democratic Union (CDU), he was the longest-serving member of any democratic German parliament. Schäuble served as the 13th president of the Bundestag from 2017 to 2021.

Born in Freiburg im Breisgau in 1942, Schäuble studied at both the University of Freiburg and the University of Hamburg and subsequently began a career in law at the district court of Offenburg in 1978. His political career began in 1969 as a member of the Junge Union, the youth division of the CDU and CSU; in 1972, Schäuble was elected to the Bundestag by winning the constituency seat of Offenburg, and he was a member of the Bundestag until his death. His ministerial career began in 1984 when he was appointed minister for special affairs by chancellor Helmut Kohl. In a 1989 reshuffle, Schäuble was appointed minister of the interior, and he led negotiations for reunification on behalf of the Federal Republic of Germany. During his tenure as minister of the interior, Schäuble was one of the most popular politicians in Germany and was regularly mentioned as a possible future chancellor, though he faced occasional criticism from civil rights activists for his law and order policies.

After the defeat of the CDU/CSU in the 1998 federal election, Schäuble succeeded his mentor Helmut Kohl as chairman of the CDU, but resigned after less than two years in the aftermath of the 1999 CDU donations scandal. In 2005, Schäuble again became minister of the interior in the cabinet of chancellor Angela Merkel, and in 2009 minister of finance, a position he remained in for almost eight years. Described in this capacity as "Germany's second most powerful person" after Merkel, he took a hard line toward Southern European countries during the eurozone crisis, and rejected calls from the International Monetary Fund to give Greece more time to rein in deficits. A proponent of austerity policies, Schäuble's 2014 budget allowed Germany to take on no new debt for the first time since 1969, which is generally known as Black Zero in CDU election campaigns.

On 27 September 2017, the CDU/CSU group in the Bundestag announced Schäuble's nomination as president of the Bundestag. He was elected to that position on 24 October 2017 and held that position until the CDU/CSU was defeated in the 2021 federal election.

== Early life and education ==
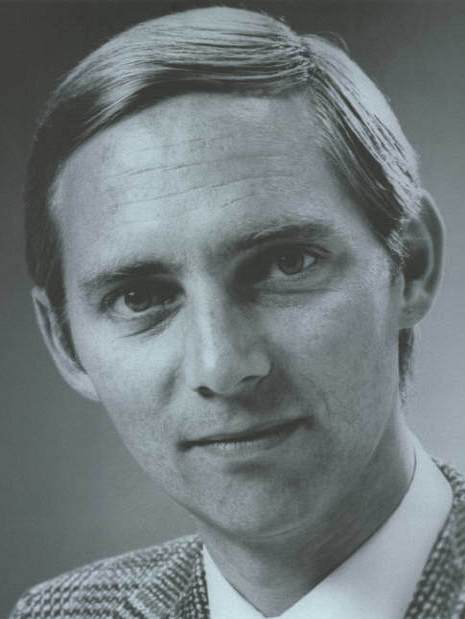
Schäuble in early years

Schäuble was born in Freiburg im Breisgau, as the son of tax finance advisor and politician Karl Schäuble and Gertrud Göhring. He is the middle brother of three.

After completing his Abitur in 1961, Schäuble studied law and economics at the University of Freiburg and the University of Hamburg, which he completed in 1966 and 1970 by passing the First and Second State Examinations respectively, becoming a fully qualified lawyer.

In 1971, Schäuble obtained his doctorate in law, with a dissertation called "The public accountant's professional legal situation within accountancy firms".

== Early career ==
Schäuble entered the tax administration of the state of Baden-Württemberg, eventually becoming a senior administration officer in the Freiburg tax office. Subsequently, he became a practising registered lawyer at the district court of Offenburg, from 1978 to 1984.

== Political career ==
Schäuble's political career began in 1961 with him joining the Junge Union ("Young Union"), the youth division of the CDU. During his studies he served as chairman of the Ring Christlich-Demokratischer Studenten (Association of Christian-Democrat Students, RCDS), in Hamburg and Freiburg. In 1965 Schäuble also became a member of the CDU. From 1969 to 1972, he was district chairman of the Junge Union in South Baden. From 1976 to 1984, he served as chairman of the CDU National Committee for Sport.

=== Member of Parliament, 1972 to 2023 ===
Schäuble first became a member of the Bundestag in 1972. On 21 October 2017, Schäuble became the longest serving member of parliament in German history overtaking August Bebel, who had been a member of the North German Reichstag and the Reichstag from 1867 until 1881 and from 1883 until 1913. From 1981 to 1984 he was parliamentary whip of the CDU/CSU group and in November 1991 he became its chairman. Schäuble gave up this position as chairman in 2000 as another consequence of the financing scandal. Between October 2002 and 2005, Schäuble served as the parliamentary group's deputy chairman, under the leadership of Angela Merkel.

Schäuble has always been elected to the Bundestag by means of winning an electorate seat, rather than through a list placing in Germany's system of proportional political representation.

=== Federal Minister for Special Affairs, 1984–1989 ===
On 15 November 1984, Schäuble was appointed as Minister for Special Affairs and head of the Chancellery by Chancellor Helmut Kohl. When in 1986 Soviet press belabored Kohl for having, in a magazine interview, made a comparison between the propaganda skills of Mikhail S. Gorbachev and Joseph Goebbels, Schäuble was reported to have counseled the Chancellor against writing Gorbachev an apology for the remark, saying it would be misunderstood as a sign of weakness.

In his capacity as Minister for Special Affairs, Schäuble was put in charge of the preparations for the first official state visit of Erich Honecker, Chairman of the State Council of the German Democratic Republic (GDR), in 1987. By that time, he was widely considered to be one of Kohl's closest advisers.

=== Federal Minister of the Interior, 1989–1991 ===
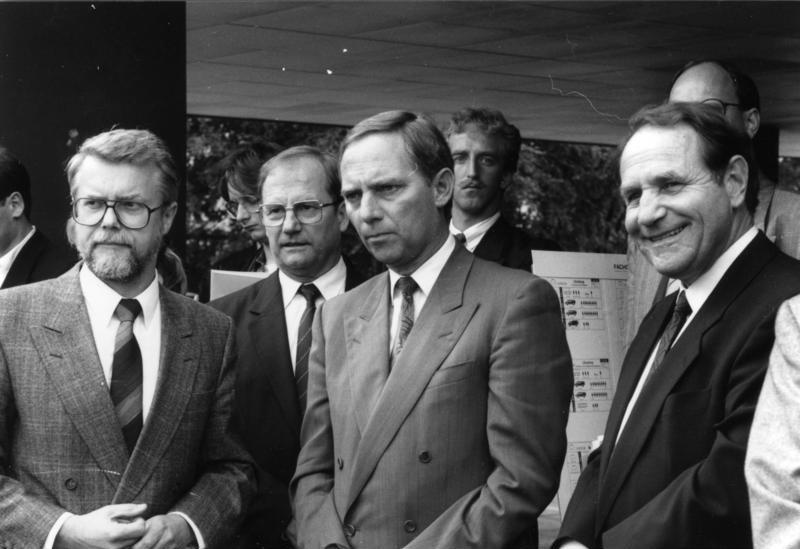
Schäuble (front centre) as Federal Minister of the Interior, 1989

In a cabinet reshuffle Schäuble was made Minister of the Interior on 21 April 1989. In this role he also led the negotiations on behalf of the Federal Republic of Germany for reunification with the GDR in 1990. He and East German State Secretary Günther Krause signed the Unification Treaty on 31 August 1990. In a speech to parliament in 1991, Schäuble clinched the argument in favour of moving the German capital from Bonn to Berlin.

There was constant speculation that he would replace Kohl as Chancellor, whose popularity was declining. In November 1991, Schäuble became the Christian Democrats' parliamentary floor leader, replacing 71-year-old Alfred Dregger, in a move that made him Kohl's likely heir-apparent. In 1997 Helmut Kohl stated that Schäuble was his desired candidate to succeed him, but he did not want to hand over power until 2002. Because the CDU/CSU lost the 1998 election, he did not become Chancellor.

After Eberhard Diepgen was voted out as mayor of Berlin, Schäuble was in talks to be the top candidate for the early election on 21 October 2001, but was rejected by the Berlin branch of the CDU in favour of Frank Steffel.

Some quarters of the CDU and CSU wanted to put Schäuble forward as their candidate for the office of German President, the largely ceremonial head of state, at the beginning of March 2004, due to his extensive political experience. In spite of support from the Premiers of Bavaria (Edmund Stoiber (CSU)) and Hesse (Roland Koch (CDU)), Schäuble did not receive the party's nomination in the end because CDU leader Angela Merkel, other CDU politicians and the liberal FDP party spoke out against him. This was because the election contributions scandal involving Schäuble that first came to light in late 1999 had never been entirely resolved.

=== CDU Party Chairman, 1998–2000 ===
After the CDU was defeated in the 1998 federal election, Schäuble succeeded Helmut Kohl as chairman of the CDU. In 2000, Schäuble was forced to resign from the post as CDU chairman, as well as leader of the parliamentary group in the Bundestag in the CDU Donations scandal, known in German as the Schwarzgeldaffäre (the 'Black Money Affair'). Schäuble admitted to accepting DM100,000 (£40,000) in cash from Karlheinz Schreiber, an arms dealer and convicted criminal.

=== Federal Minister of the Interior, 2005–2009 ===
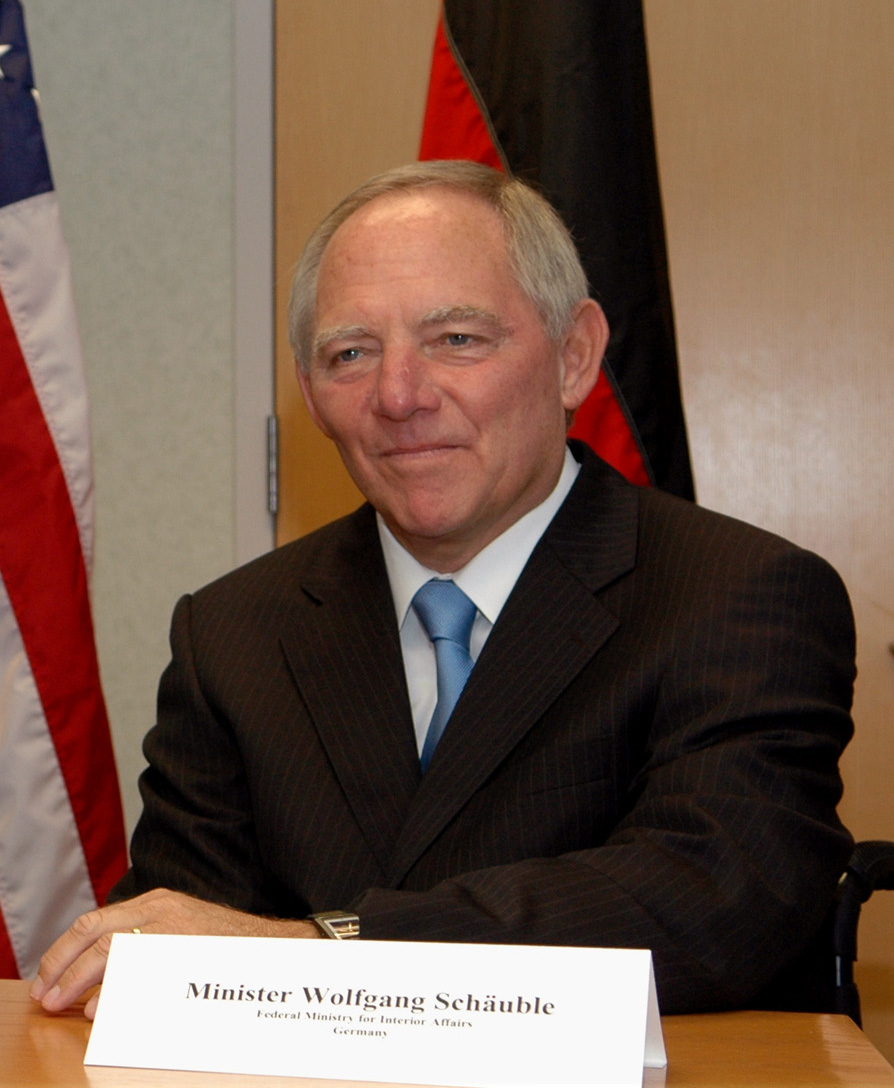
Schäuble in 2007

Ahead of the 2005 elections, Angela Merkel included Schäuble in her shadow cabinet for the Christian Democrats' campaign to unseat incumbent Gerhard Schröder as chancellor. During the campaign, Schäuble served as Merkel's expert for security and foreign policy.

Following the elections, Schäuble was mentioned as potential candidate for the office of Federal Minister of Defense. In the subsequent negotiations to form a coalition government, he led the CDU/CSU delegation in the working group on interior policy; his co-chair from the SPD was Brigitte Zypries. Once the new government was formed, Schäuble once again became Minister of the Interior, this time in the Grand Coalition under Chancellor Angela Merkel.

Between 2007 and 2009, Schäuble was one of 32 members of the Second Commission on the modernization of the federal state, which had been established to reform the division of powers between federal and state authorities in Germany.

=== Federal Minister of Finance, 2009–2017 ===
Following the 2009 federal election, Schäuble, by then one of Germany's most seasoned politicians, became Minister of Finance in October 2009. Then aged 67, he was the oldest man in the cabinet and the longest-serving member of the parliament in the history of the Federal Republic. He was also one of seven conservative ministers in Merkel's outgoing government who remained in power. By 2014, the Wall Street Journal called Schäuble "Germany's second most powerful person after Chancellor Angela Merkel".

During his time in office, Schäuble was widely regarded the most vocal advocate in the government of European integration, and a passionate proponent of co-operation with France. Along with Merkel, he often took a hard line toward some Southern European countries during the eurozone crisis. In 2012, Schäuble rejected calls from the chairwoman of the International Monetary Fund, Christine Lagarde, to give Greece more time to make additional spending cuts to rein in deficits. That same year, President Karolos Papoulias of Greece accused Schäuble of insulting his nation. In October 2013, Schäuble was accused by the former Portuguese Prime Minister, José Sócrates, for regularly placing news in the media against Portugal during the eurozone crisis prior to the Portuguese bailout; Sócrates called him a "Sly Minister of Finance".

A leading advocate of austerity during the eurozone crisis, Schäuble in 2014 pushed through a national budget of 299 billion euros that allowed Germany not to take on any new debt for the first time since 1969. In the first half of 2016, he recorded an 18.5 billion euros budget surplus. He has been described variously as the "personification of fiscal discipline" and "Europe's foremost ayatollah of austerity". Schäuble's reputation for tough control of spending has been helped by Germany's rapid recovery from recession but he has repeatedly rebuffed calls from government supporters for vote-winning tax cuts. Throughout his tenure, he stood by his position that structural reforms such as overhauling labor markets in Europe are the way out of a low-growth spiral. In 2013, for example, Schäuble and Vítor Gaspar, his counterpart in Portugal, announced a plan to use the German state development bank KfW to help set up a financial institution to assist Portuguese under age 25 in getting jobs or job training.

In 2012, following the resignation of Jean-Claude Juncker as president of the 17 euro zone finance ministers, known as the Eurogroup, suggestions soon gathered pace that Chancellor Angela Merkel was pressing for Schäuble to take up the position; the job later went to Jeroen Dijsselbloem instead.

In the negotiations to form a coalition government following the 2013 federal elections, he led the CDU/CSU delegation in the financial policy working group; his co-chair from the SPD was the Mayor of Hamburg, Olaf Scholz. Between 2014 and 2015, Schäuble and Scholz again led the negotiations on overhauling the so-called solidarity surcharge on income and corporate tax (Solidaritätszuschlag) and reorganizing financial relations between Germany's federal government and the federal states.

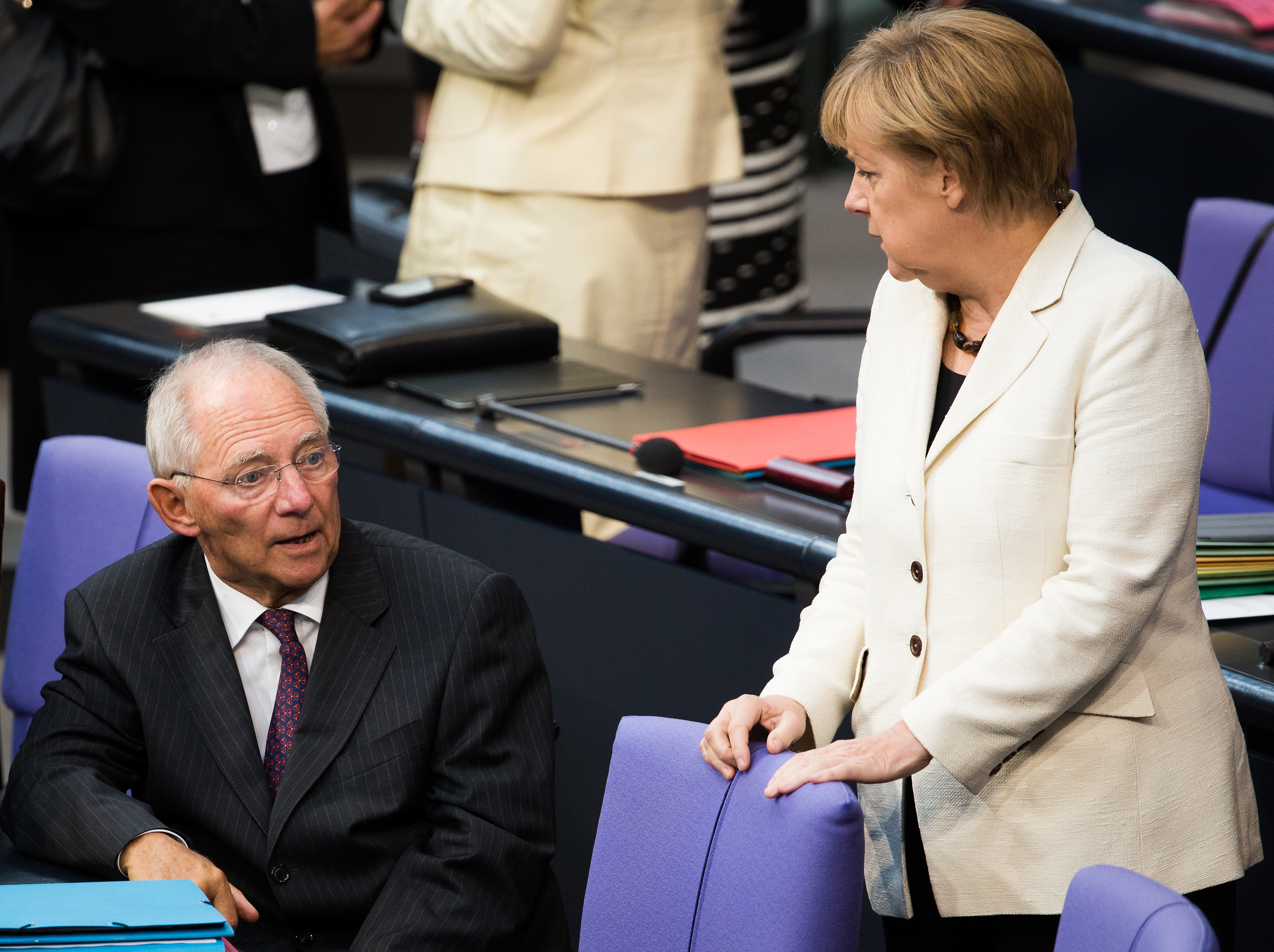
Schäuble and Angela Merkel in the German Bundestag, 2014

In a letter to the European Commissioner for Economic and Financial Affairs, Taxation and Customs Pierre Moscovici in late 2014, Schäuble and the finance ministers of the eurozone's other big economies – Michel Sapin of France and Pier Carlo Padoan of Italy – urged the European Commission to draw up EU-wide laws to curb corporate tax avoidance and prevent member states from offering lower taxes to attract investors, calling for a comprehensive anti-BEPS (Base Erosion and Profit Shifting) directive for member states to adopt by the end of 2015.

On Schäuble's initiative, Germany became a founding member of the Asian Infrastructure Investment Bank. At a 2015 meeting of the G-20 major economies, he called for better integration of Islamic finance into the international financial system.

Schäuble was criticized by Yanis Varoufakis for his actions during the "Grexit" crisis of 2015. In early 2014, former US Treasury Secretary Tim Geithner called Schäuble's "Grexit" plan "frightening," Geithner recorded that Schäuble believed a Greek exit from the Eurozone would scare other countries into line. Schäuble also received extensive criticism toward his austerity recommendations from Twitter via the hashtag #ThisIsACoup.

When Federal President Joachim Gauck announced in June 2016 that he would not stand for reelection, Schäuble was soon mentioned by German and international media as likely successor; the post eventually went to Frank-Walter Steinmeier instead.

From late 2016, Schäuble served as member of the German government's cabinet committee on Brexit at which ministers discuss organizational and structural issues related to the United Kingdom's departure from the European Union.

=== President of the Bundestag, 2017–2021 ===
Following the 2017 elections, Schäuble was persuaded to step down as Minister of Finance. He was nominated by the majority CDU/CSU parliamentary group as the next president of the Bundestag, succeeding Norbert Lammert. In his capacity as president, he chaired the parliament's Council of Elders, which – among other duties – determines daily legislative agenda items and assigns committee chairpersons based on party representation.

As Bundestag President, Schäuble worked to curb the antics of the far-right Alternative for Germany, the largest opposition party in the Bundestag.

As the country's second-highest-ranking official, Schäuble represented Germany at the funeral of U.S. Senator John McCain in 2018.

Ahead of the Christian Democrats' leadership election in 2018, Schäuble publicly endorsed Friedrich Merz to succeed Angela Merkel as the party's chair.

Following the 2021 German federal election, the SPD became the largest party in the Bundestag. By convention, the largest party gets to choose the President. The SPD nominated Bärbel Bas, who was elected during the opening session of the 20th Bundestag. Schäuble remained a Member of the Bundestag. Since he was the longest-serving Member of the Bundestag, serving as Alterspräsident, it was his task to oversee the opening session of the new Bundestag, including the election of his successor.

== Political views ==
=== European integration ===
Echoing earlier proposals made by Prime Minister Édouard Balladur of France, Schäuble and fellow lawmaker Karl Lamers in 1994 urged the European Union to adopt a policy they called "variable geometry" under which five countries most committed to integration – Germany, France, Belgium, the Netherlands and Luxembourg – would proceed swiftly toward monetary union, joint foreign and defense policies and other forms of integration. In 2014, both reiterated their ideas in an op-ed for the Financial Times, renewing their call for a core group of European Union countries to move ahead faster with economic and political integration. Countries such as Britain should put forward proposals for returning some competences to national governments, they said, while "the EU should focus mainly on the following areas: a fair and open internal market; trade; currency and financial markets; climate, environment and energy; and foreign and security policy." Also, they proposed the establishment of a European budget commissioner with powers to reject national budgets if they do not correspond to the jointly agreed rules and a "eurozone parliament" comprising the MEPs of eurozone countries to strengthen the democratic legitimacy of decisions affecting the single currency bloc.

On 21 November 2011 Schäuble said the euro would emerge stronger from the current crisis, and ultimately all non-members would be convinced to sign up. He said Great Britain would eventually join the euro (but that he respected Britain's decision to keep the pound). On a British exit from the EU, Schäuble argued in 2014 that Britain's EU membership was particularly important for Germany as both countries share a market-oriented reform approach in many economic and regulatory questions.

In 2015, then-Finance Minister Yanis Varoufakis of Greece called Schäuble "the intellectual force behind the project of European Monetary Union".

In 2015, Schäuble raised the idea of stripping the European Commission of regulatory powers, expressing concern over its neutrality and willingness to fulfil its role as "guardian of the treaties", in particular with regard to the enforcement of rules on budget discipline; unnamed diplomats were cited by Reuters as stating that this was not incompatible with his reputation as "a veteran pro-European who has long favored turning the Commission over time into a European 'government'". Following the Brexit in 2016, Schäuble urged Member States to be more pragmatic and take an intergovernmental approach to solving problems.

=== Foreign policy ===
Schäuble was considered a "committed transatlanticist". On 7 June 2011, he was among the guests invited to the state dinner hosted by President Barack Obama in honor of Chancellor Angela Merkel at the White House.

In 2002, shortly before the Iraq War, Schäuble accused German Chancellor Gerhard Schröder of "strengthening Saddam Hussein" by undermining the unanimity of international pressure on Iraq to open up to United Nations weapons inspectors. On Schröder's initiative to join forces with President Jacques Chirac of France and President Vladimir Putin of Russia in opposing the war, Schäuble commented: "This triangular relationship involving Berlin, Paris and Moscow was a dangerous development. It was very dangerous for the small countries in Europe because they perceived it as an axis and you can understand why. We want good relations with Russia but we do not want those relations to be misunderstood." Schäuble, in contrast to many German politicians, subsequently defended the United States' decision to invade Iraq. By 2006, he said he thought the overthrow of Saddam Hussein was in itself correct, but that he was "doubtful" from the outset about the Iraq war because it resulted from a unilateral decision by the US.

Schäuble accused Chancellor Gerhard Schröder of lacking an appropriate historical conscience, because he accepted alleged human rights violations by the Russian government without criticism. On 31 March 2014, Schäuble compared the annexation of the Sudetenland by Nazi Germany in 1938 to the annexation of Crimea by the Russian Federation. Similar to Vladimir Putin, Adolf Hitler had claimed that "ethnic Germans" in peripheral regions of what was then Czechoslovakia required protection.

=== Domestic policy ===
In 1999 Schäuble initiated a CDU/CSU petition campaign against the reform of German nationality law under the slogan "Integration: yes – double citizenship: no". In response to anti-immigrant rallies in the eastern city of Dresden in late 2014, Schäuble said that immigration is good for Germany and politicians must explain better that everyone stands to gain from it; at the time, the number of asylum seekers in Germany, many from Syria, had more than doubled within a year to around 200,000, and net immigration was at its highest level in two decades. "Just as we used millions of refugees and expellees after World War Two to rebuild ... so we need immigration today", Schäuble told Bild when asked about the popularity of anti-immigration policies. Also, he held that "people are right to fear Islamist terrorism. But not Islam." In September 2015, he urged the Member States of the European Union to quickly establish a common European asylum law.

Schäuble was among the high-ranking guests attending the re-opening of Rykestrasse Synagogue, Germany's largest synagogue, in September 2007. In May 2008, he banned two right-wing organizations he described as "reservoirs of organized Holocaust deniers". In 2009, he also banned the Homeland-Faithful German Youth (HDJ), a far-right group, on grounds that it organizes seemingly harmless activities, such as holiday activities, to promote racist and Nazi ideology among children and young people.

Between 2015 and 2016, Schäuble and the Conference on Jewish Material Claims Against Germany, which manages aid to Holocaust survivors, negotiated a budget of some $500 million, the largest one-time increase in homecare funding for survivors the organization has ever secured.

Schäuble had long been considered one of several prominent conservatives in favour of shifting the CDU's restrictive stance on gay marriage. In June 2017, he voted against Germany's introduction of same-sex marriage.

=== Domestic security ===
Schäuble called for stronger counterterrorism policies after joining the first Merkel government in 2005. Shortly after he assumed the position of Minister of the Interior, the 2006 German train bombing plot became the closest Germany is known to have come to a large-scale terrorist attack since 11 September 2001, and Schäuble publicly stated the country escaped that one only through luck. As a consequence of the terrorism threats, Schäuble proposed several controversial measures. Ahead of the 2006 FIFA World Cup in Germany, he repeatedly advocated for amending the constitution to allow the military's use for domestic security purposes. Among the methods that he believed Germans should at least debate are preventive detention of people suspected of terrorist activities and assassinations of the leaders of terrorist organizations. In March 2007, Schäuble said in an interview that the application of presumption of innocence should not be relevant for the authorization of counter-terrorist operations. Later that same year Schäuble proposed the introduction of legislation that would allow the German federal government to carry out targeted killing of terrorists, as well as outlaw the use of the Internet and cell phones for people suspected of being terrorist sympathizers. On 27 February 2008, he called on all European newspapers to print the Muhammad cartoons with the explanation: "We also think they're pathetic, but the use of press freedom is no reason to resort to violence." In July 2009, Schäuble said in an interview that Berlin would have to "clarify whether our constitutional state is sufficient for confronting new threats". He said that the legal problems his office had to struggle with "extend all the way to extreme cases such as so-called targeted killing ... Imagine someone knew what cave Osama bin Laden is sitting in. A remote-controlled missile could then be fired in order to kill him." The interviewer said: "Germany's federal government would probably send a public prosecutor there first, to arrest bin Laden." Schäuble responded: "And the Americans would execute him with a missile, and most people would say: 'thank God'."

In the wake of the deadly attacks in Paris on the offices of satirical publication Charlie Hebdo and a kosher supermarket in January 2015, Schäuble and his French counterpart Michel Sapin wrote a letter to the European Commission, calling for continent-wide legislation to better trace financial flows and freeze the assets of terrorists living in the European Union.

== Personal life ==
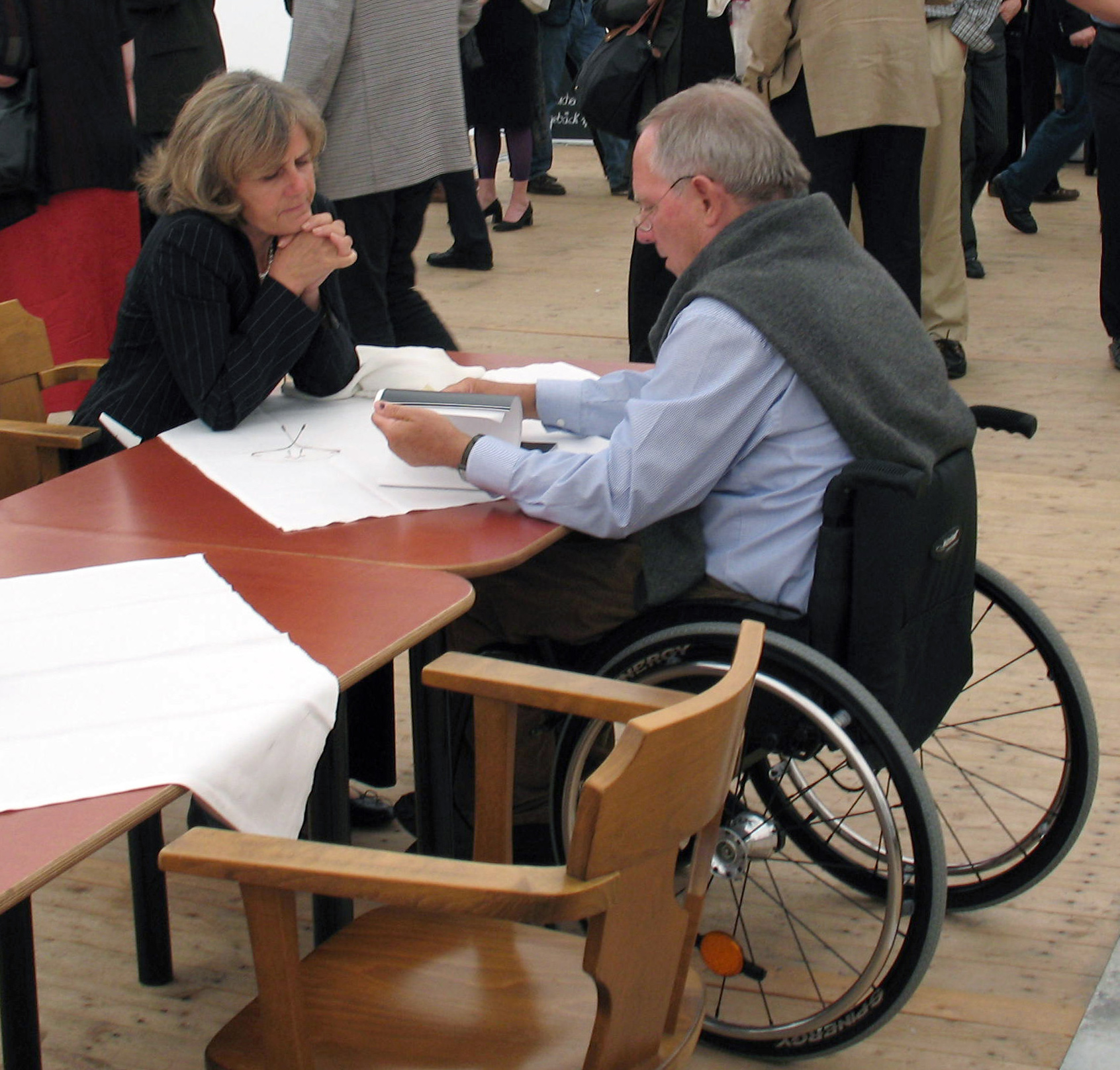
Schäuble with his wife Ingeborg, 2007

Schäuble was married to economist, teacher and former Welthungerhilfe chairwoman Ingeborg Hensle from 1969. They had four children: three daughters and one son. His late brother, Thomas Schäuble (1948–2013), was a former Interior Minister of Baden-Württemberg, and an executive chairman of the Baden-Württemberg state brewery Rothaus from 2004 to 2013. His son-in-law was Thomas Strobl, who has also served as Interior Minister of Baden-Württemberg.

Schäuble and his wife lived in Gengenbach before moving to Offenburg in 2011. They also had an apartment in Berlin's Grunewald district.

When Schäuble celebrated his 70th birthday at the Deutsches Theater in Berlin in September 2012, Chancellor Angela Merkel and Christine Lagarde, the managing director of the International Monetary Fund, delivered the keynote speeches in his honor.

=== Attempted assassination ===
On 12 October 1990, at the age of 48 and just after the reunification of Germany, Schäuble was the target of an assassination attempt by a mentally unwell drug user named Dieter Kaufmann. Kaufmann fired three shots at him after an election campaign event attended by about 300 people in Oppenau. As well as injuring a bodyguard and giving Schäuble facial wounds, the attack severely damaged Schäuble's spinal cord. He used a wheelchair for the rest of his life.

Schäuble returned to work within three months, before he had finished a medical program to adapt to the reduced mobility caused by paralysis of his lower body. For his last rally in the 1990 elections, Chancellor Helmut Kohl travelled to Offenburg, where Schäuble made his first public appearance after the assassination attempt to a crowd of about 9,000.

=== Illness and death ===
In May 2010, on his way to Brussels for an emergency meeting of European Union finance ministers, Schäuble found himself in the intensive care unit of a Belgian hospital, battling complications from an earlier operation and an allergic reaction to a new antibiotic. At that point, the German news media speculated about his resignation, and even his chances of survival. Merkel twice declined his offer to step down during a period of ill health in 2010.

Schäuble died of cancer on 26 December 2023, at the age of 81. Several days prior to his death, he was treated at clinics in Heilbronn for the disease. President of Germany Frank-Walter Steinmeier ordered a state occasion at his death held on 5 January 2024. His funeral was held on 5 January 2024 in the Evangelical City Church of Offenburg and he was buried in the local cemetery after the ceremony.

In May 2024, Schäuble’s grave in Offenburg was found desecrated.

== Other activities (selection) ==
=== Corporate boards ===
- KfW, Deputy Chairman of the Board of Supervisory Directors (2009–2017)
- Asian Infrastructure Investment Bank (AIIB), Ex-Officio Member of the Board of Governors (2016–2017)

=== Non-profits ===
- Friends of the Festspielhaus Baden-Baden, Chairman
- Deutsche Nationalstiftung, Member of the Board of Trustees
- Deutsche Stiftung Denkmalschutz, Member of the Board of Trustees
- Deutsche Stiftung Querschnittlähmung ("German Paraplegia Foundation"), Member of the Board of Trustees
- Deutsches Museum, Member of the Board of Trustees
- Friends of the Berliner Philharmonie, Member of the Board of Trustees
- House of Finance, Goethe University Frankfurt, Member of the Board of Trustees
- International Foundation for Research in Paraplegia, Member of the Board of Trustees
- Max Planck Society, Member of the Board of Trustees
- RAG-Stiftung, ex-officio Member of the Board of Trustees
- Robert Schuman Foundation, Member of the Board of Directors
- 2011 FIFA Women's World Cup, Member of the Board of Trustees

== Recognition (selection) ==
=== Honorary degrees ===
- 1992: Honorary Doctorate of the University of Erlangen-Nuremberg
- 2005: Honorary Doctorate of the University of Fribourg
- 2006: Honorary Doctorate of the University of Warmia and Mazury in Olsztyn
- 2009: Honorary Doctorate of the University of Tübingen
- 2011: Honorary Doctorate of the Corvinus University of Budapest

=== Other honors ===
- 1986: Order of Merit of the Italian Republic
- 1988: Grand-Officier de l'Ordre National du Mérite by the President of France
- 1989: Grand Commander (Commander with the star) of the Order of Merit of the Federal Republic of Germany
- 1991: Grand Cross 1st class of the Order of Merit of the Federal Republic of Germany
- 1998: Konrad-Adenauer-Preis
- 1998: Ordre national de la Légion d'honneur
- 2008: Order of Merit of Baden-Württemberg
- 2010: Toleranzpreis der Evangelischen Akademie Tutzing
- 2011: Order of the Oak Crown of the Grand Duchy of Luxembourg
- 2012: International Charlemagne Prize of Aachen
- 2014: Award for Understanding and Tolerance of the Jewish Museum Berlin
- 2015: Bambi Award
- 2016: Leopold Kunschak Prize
- 2017: Kissinger Prize
- 2017: Member of the Académie des Sciences Morales et Politiques
- 2019: Grand Officer of the Order of the Three Stars
- 2022: Grand Cross of the Hungarian Order of Merit

== Selected works ==
=== Books ===
- Schäuble, Wolfgang; Koch, Dirk; Wirtgen, Klaus (1991). Der Vertrag (in German). Stuttgart: Dt. Verl.-Anst. ISBN 978-3-421-06605-3.
- —— (1994). Und der Zukunft zugewandt (in German). Berlin: Siedler. ISBN 978-3-88680-555-6.
- —— (1998). Und sie bewegt sich doch (in German). Berlin: Siedler Verlag. ISBN 978-3-88680-650-8.
- —— (2000). Mitten im Leben (in German). München: Bertelsmann. ISBN 978-3-570-00497-5.
- —— (2003). Scheitert der Westen? (in German). München: Bertelsmann. ISBN 978-3-570-00788-4.
- —— (2009). Zukunft mit Mass (in German). Lahr: Johannis. ISBN 978-3-501-05190-0.

=== Lectures ===
- Schäuble, Wolfgang (2009). "60 Jahre Grundgesetz : Verfassungsanspruch und Wirklichkeit; [29.01.2009, Vortrag, Universität Karlsruhe, Zentrum für Angewandte Kulturwissenschaft und Studium Generale]". Zentrum für Angewandte Kulturwissenschaft und Studium Generale. doi:10.5445/DIVA/2009-49.

Political offices
| Preceded by Waldemar Schreckenberger | Chief of the Chancellery; 1984–1989 | Succeeded by Rudolf Seiters |
| Preceded by Egon Bahr | Minister for Special Affairs; 1984–1989 | Succeeded by Rudolf Seiters |
| Preceded by Friedrich Zimmermann | Minister of the Interior; 1989–1991 | Succeeded by Rudolf Seiters |
| Preceded by Otto Schily | Minister of the Interior; 2005–2009 | Succeeded by Thomas de Maizière |
| Preceded by Peer Steinbrück | Minister of Finance; 2009–2017 | Succeeded by Peter Altmaier; Acting |
| Preceded by Norbert Lammert | President of the Bundestag; 2017–2021 | Succeeded by Bärbel Bas |
Party political offices
| Preceded by Alfred Dregger | Chair of the CDU/CSU Group in the Bundestag; 1991–2000 | Succeeded by Friedrich Merz |
| Preceded by Helmut Kohl | Leader of the Christian Democratic Union; 1998–2000 | Succeeded by Angela Merkel |
Awards
| Preceded by Jean-Claude Trichet | Laureate of the Charlemagne Prize; 2012 | Succeeded by Dalia Grybauskaitė |
Honorary titles
| Preceded by Hermann Otto Solms | Father of the Bundestag; 2021–2023 | Succeeded by Peter Ramsauer |
