= Schwarzwald-Baar (electoral district) =

Constituency for the elections to the German Bundestag

286 Schwarzwald-Baar
- Electoral district for the Bundestag
- Schwarzwald-Baar in 2025
- State: Baden-Württemberg
- Population: 233,300 (2019)
- Electorate: 162,800 (2021)
- Major settlements: Villingen-Schwenningen; Donaueschingen; Bad Dürrheim
- Area: 1,266.8 km^{2}

Current electoral district
- Created: 1980
- Party: CDU
- Member: Thorsten Frei
- Elected: 2013, 2017, 2021, 2025

Schwarzwald-Baar is an electoral constituency (German: Wahlkreis) represented in the Bundestag. It elects one member via first-past-the-post voting. Under the current constituency numbering system, it is designated as constituency 286. It is located in southwestern Baden-Württemberg, comprising the district of Schwarzwald-Baar-Kreis and southeastern parts of the Ortenaukreis district.

Schwarzwald-Baar was created for the 1980 federal election. Since 2013, it has been represented by Thorsten Frei of the Christian Democratic Union (CDU).

== Geography ==
Schwarzwald-Baar is located in southwestern Baden-Württemberg. As of the 2021 federal election, it comprises the district of Schwarzwald-Baar-Kreis and the municipalities of Gutach (Schwarzwaldbahn), Hausach, Hornberg, Oberwolfach, Wolfach from the Ortenaukreis district.

== History ==
Schwarzwald-Baar was created in 1980. In the 1980 through 1998 elections, it was constituency 190 in the numbering system. In the 2002 and 2005 elections, it was number 287. Since the 2009 election, it has been number 286.

Originally, the constituency was coterminous with the Schwarzwald-Baar-Kreis district. It acquired its current borders in the 2002 election.

Election	No.	Name	Borders
1980	190	Schwarzwald-Baar	Schwarzwald-Baar-Kreis district
1983	190	Schwarzwald-Baar	Schwarzwald-Baar-Kreis district
1987	190	Schwarzwald-Baar	Schwarzwald-Baar-Kreis district
1990	190	Schwarzwald-Baar	Schwarzwald-Baar-Kreis district
1994	190	Schwarzwald-Baar	Schwarzwald-Baar-Kreis district
1998	190	Schwarzwald-Baar	Schwarzwald-Baar-Kreis district
2002	287	Schwarzwald-Baar	Schwarzwald-Baar-Kreis district; Ortenaukreis district (only Gutach (Schwarzwaldbahn), Hausach, Hornberg, Oberwolfach, Wolfach municipalities)
2005	287	Schwarzwald-Baar	Schwarzwald-Baar-Kreis district; Ortenaukreis district (only Gutach (Schwarzwaldbahn), Hausach, Hornberg, Oberwolfach, Wolfach municipalities)
2009	286	Schwarzwald-Baar	Schwarzwald-Baar-Kreis district; Ortenaukreis district (only Gutach (Schwarzwaldbahn), Hausach, Hornberg, Oberwolfach, Wolfach municipalities)
2013	286	Schwarzwald-Baar	Schwarzwald-Baar-Kreis district; Ortenaukreis district (only Gutach (Schwarzwaldbahn), Hausach, Hornberg, Oberwolfach, Wolfach municipalities)
2017	286	Schwarzwald-Baar	Schwarzwald-Baar-Kreis district; Ortenaukreis district (only Gutach (Schwarzwaldbahn), Hausach, Hornberg, Oberwolfach, Wolfach municipalities)
2021	286	Schwarzwald-Baar	Schwarzwald-Baar-Kreis district; Ortenaukreis district (only Gutach (Schwarzwaldbahn), Hausach, Hornberg, Oberwolfach, Wolfach municipalities)
2025	286	Schwarzwald-Baar	Schwarzwald-Baar-Kreis district; Ortenaukreis district (only Gutach (Schwarzwaldbahn), Hausach, Hornberg, Oberwolfach, Wolfach municipalities)

== Members ==
The constituency has been held continuously by Christian Democratic Union (CDU) since its creation. It was first represented by Hansjörg Häfele from 1980 to 1990, followed by Meinrad Belle from 1990 to 2002. Siegfried Kauder was representative from 2002 to 2013. Thorsten Frei was elected in 2013, and re-elected in 2017 and 2021.

Election	Member	Party	%
1980	Hansjörg Häfele	CDU	55.4
1983	Hansjörg Häfele	CDU	62.9
1987	Hansjörg Häfele	CDU	56.2
1990	Meinrad Belle	CDU	53.6
1994	Meinrad Belle	CDU	52.0
1998	Meinrad Belle	CDU	44.9
2002	Siegfried Kauder	CDU	49.7
2005	Siegfried Kauder	CDU	51.3
2009	Siegfried Kauder	CDU	47.4
2013	Thorsten Frei	CDU	56.7
2017	Thorsten Frei	CDU	47.0
2021	Thorsten Frei	CDU	36.4
2025	Thorsten Frei	CDU	42.3

== Election results ==
=== 2025 election ===
Federal election (2025): Schwarzwald-Baar
Notes:	Blue background denotes the winner of the electorate vote. Pink background denotes a candidate elected from their party list. Yellow background denotes an electorate win by a list member, or other incumbent. A ✓ or ✗ denotes status of any incumbent, win or lose respectively.						
Party	Candidate	Votes	%	±%	Party votes	%	±%
CDU	✓ Thorsten Frei	55,045	42.3	▲5.9	44,340	34.0	▲7.5
AfD	Sebastian van Ryt	29,141	22.4	▲11.9	30,951	23.8	▲11.0
SPD	Derya Türk-Nachbaur	19,395	14.9	▼3.2	16,814	12.9	▼8.3
Greens	Marin Juric	9,979	7.7	▼4.4	12,895	9.9	▼3.4
Left	Heinrich Hermann	5,295	4.1	▲1.8	6,591	5.1	▲2.5
FDP	Mark Hohensee	4,524	3.5	▼10.3	6,873	5.3	▼10.9
FW	Leon Dold	2,933	2.2	▼0.5	2,066	1.6	▼0.4
Independent	Louis Weißer	2,260	1.7				
Volt	Selina Schmidt	1,499	1.2		929	0.7	▲0.4
MLPD				▼0.1	47	0.0	0.0
BSW					5,810	4.5	
Tierschutzpartei					1,243	1.0	▼0.4
PARTEI					502	0.4	▼0.3
Bündnis C					285	0.2	0.0
ÖDP					232	0.2	0.0
BD					172	0.1	
Team Todenhöfer							▼0.3
Pirates							▼0.4
Gesundheitsforschung							▼0.2
Humanists							▼0.1
Informal votes		1,065			905		
Total valid votes		130,071			130,231		
Turnout		131,136	81.8	▲6.3			
CDU hold	Majority	25,904	19.9	▲17.8			

=== 2021 election ===
Federal election (2021): Schwarzwald-Baar
Notes:	Blue background denotes the winner of the electorate vote. Pink background denotes a candidate elected from their party list. Yellow background denotes an electorate win by a list member, or other incumbent. A ✓ or ✗ denotes status of any incumbent, win or lose respectively.						
Party	Candidate	Votes	%	±%	Party votes	%	±%
CDU	✓ Thorsten Frei	44,188	36.4	▼10.6	32,309	26.6	▼11.2
SPD	Derya Türk-Nachbaur	21,996	18.1	▲1.4	25,814	21.2	▲5.6
FDP	Marcel Klinge	16,747	13.8	▲5.3	19,696	16.2	▲4.0
Greens	Thomas Bleile	14,692	12.1	▲2.3	16,181	13.3	▲1.1
AfD	Martin Rothweiler	12,795	10.5	▼0.8	13,097	10.8	▼1.6
dieBasis	Marie-Therese Herrmann	4,871	4.0		3,819	3.1	
FW	Marius Maier	3,306	2.7	▲1.6	2,390	2.0	▲1.2
Left	Heinrich Hermann	2,757	2.3	▼2.1	3,062	2.5	▼2.8
Tierschutzpartei					1,602	1.3	▲0.5
PARTEI					843	0.7	▲0.1
Pirates					442	0.4	0.0
Team Todenhöfer					416	0.3	
Volt					357	0.3	
Bündnis C					292	0.2	
ÖDP					276	0.2	0.0
NPD					196	0.2	▼0.3
Gesundheitsforschung					189	0.2	
Bürgerbewegung					152	0.1	
Humanists					107	0.1	
DiB					100	0.1	0.0
MLPD	Helmut Kruse-Günter	140	0.1	0.0	58	0.0	0.0
Bündnis 21					51	0.0	
DKP					40	0.0	0.0
LKR					33	0.0	
Informal votes		1,370			1,340		
Total valid votes		121,492			121,522		
Turnout		122,862	75.5	▼0.5			
CDU hold	Majority	22,192	18.3	▼12.0			

=== 2017 election ===
Federal election (2017): Schwarzwald-Baar
Notes:	Blue background denotes the winner of the electorate vote. Pink background denotes a candidate elected from their party list. Yellow background denotes an electorate win by a list member, or other incumbent. A ✓ or ✗ denotes status of any incumbent, win or lose respectively.						
Party	Candidate	Votes	%	±%	Party votes	%	±%
CDU	✓ Thorsten Frei	58,149	47.0	▼9.7	46,812	37.8	▼11.5
SPD	Jens Löw	20,672	16.7	▼2.2	19,337	15.6	▼3.5
AfD	Joachim Senger	14,069	11.4	▲7.5	15,350	12.4	▲6.7
Greens	Volker Goerz	12,085	9.8	▲2.1	15,113	12.2	▲3.2
FDP	Marcel Klinge	10,438	8.4	▲5.9	15,124	12.2	▲6.3
Left	Patrick Bausch	5,347	4.3	▲0.8	6,608	5.3	▲1.2
Tierschutzpartei					1,028	0.8	0.0
FW	Dursun Dayi	1,405	1.1	▼0.4	992	0.8	▼0.1
NPD	Jürgen Schützinger	745	0.6	▼1.1	590	0.5	▼1.0
PARTEI					688	0.6	
Independent	Stefan Welte	579	0.5				
Pirates					464	0.4	▼1.6
Tierschutzallianz					324	0.3	
ÖDP					305	0.2	▼0.1
DM					236	0.2	
Menschliche Welt					164	0.1	
V-Partei³					162	0.1	
BGE					150	0.1	
DiB					119	0.1	
MLPD	Helmut Kruse-Günter	201	0.2		99	0.1	0.0
DIE RECHTE					39	0.0	
DKP					25	0.0	
Informal votes		1,654			1,615		
Total valid votes		123,690			123,729		
Turnout		125,344	75.9	▲4.2			
CDU hold	Majority	37,477	30.3	▼7.5			

=== 2013 election ===
Federal election (2013): Schwarzwald-Baar
Notes:	Blue background denotes the winner of the electorate vote. Pink background denotes a candidate elected from their party list. Yellow background denotes an electorate win by a list member, or other incumbent. A ✓ or ✗ denotes status of any incumbent, win or lose respectively.						
Party	Candidate	Votes	%	±%	Party votes	%	±%
CDU	Thorsten Frei	66,505	56.7	▲9.3	57,912	49.4	▲13.0
SPD	Jens Löw	22,211	18.9	▼0.2	22,414	19.1	▲1.3
Greens	Cornelia Kunkis-Becker	8,984	7.7	▼3.7	10,613	9.0	▼2.6
AfD	Dirk Caroli	4,603	3.9		6,697	5.7	
Left	Gotthilf Lorch	4,144	3.5	▼2.7	4,860	4.1	▼2.7
Independent	Siegfried Kauder	3,579	3.0				
FDP	Marcel Klinge	2,946	2.5	▼10.9	6,933	5.9	▼14.8
Pirates					2,260	1.9	▲0.1
NPD	Jürgen Schützinger	1,963	1.7	▼0.8	1,737	1.5	▼0.2
FW	Christel Bächle-Blum	1,845	1.6		1,084	0.9	
Tierschutzpartei					926	0.8	0.0
PBC					453	0.4	▼0.2
ÖDP	Christof Stocker	586	0.5		375	0.3	▼0.1
RENTNER					339	0.3	
REP					280	0.2	▼0.3
Volksabstimmung					229	0.2	▼0.1
Party of Reason					118	0.1	
PRO					76	0.1	
MLPD					57	0.0	0.0
BIG					37	0.0	
BüSo					17	0.0	0.0
Informal votes		1,815			1,836		
Total valid votes		117,366			117,345		
Turnout		119,181	71.7	▲1.6			
CDU hold	Majority	44,294	37.8	▲9.5			

=== 2009 election ===
Federal election (2009): Schwarzwald-Baar
Notes:	Blue background denotes the winner of the electorate vote. Pink background denotes a candidate elected from their party list. Yellow background denotes an electorate win by a list member, or other incumbent. A ✓ or ✗ denotes status of any incumbent, win or lose respectively.						
Party	Candidate	Votes	%	±%	Party votes	%	±%
CDU	✓ Siegfried Kauder	54,172	47.4	▼4.0	41,694	36.3	▼5.7
SPD	Friedrich Scheerer	21,835	19.1	▼11.8	20,374	17.8	▼10.0
FDP	Marcel Klinge	15,292	13.4	▲7.2	23,812	20.8	▲7.9
Greens	Cornelia Kunkis-Becker	13,034	11.4	▲4.0	13,344	11.6	▲2.9
Left	Tobias Stützer	7,158	6.3		7,837	6.8	▲3.3
Pirates					2,111	1.8	
NPD	Jürgen Schützinger	2,881	2.5	▼0.4	1,978	1.7	0.0
Tierschutzpartei					937	0.8	
PBC					694	0.6	▼0.3
REP					553	0.5	▼0.3
ÖDP					455	0.4	
Volksabstimmung					287	0.3	
DIE VIOLETTEN					254	0.2	
ADM					166	0.1	
DVU					100	0.1	
MLPD					80	0.1	▼0.1
BüSo					61	0.1	0.0
Informal votes		2,983			2,618		
Total valid votes		114,372			114,737		
Turnout		117,355	70.1	▼7.1			
CDU hold	Majority	32,337	28.3	▲7.8			

=== 2005 election ===
Federal election (2005):Schwarzwald-Baar
Notes:	Blue background denotes the winner of the electorate vote. Pink background denotes a candidate elected from their party list. Yellow background denotes an electorate win by a list member, or other incumbent. A ✓ or ✗ denotes status of any incumbent, win or lose respectively.						
Party	Candidate	Votes	%	±%	Party votes	%	±%
CDU	✓ Siegfried Kauder	64,716	51.3	▲1.6	53,146	42.0	▼4.5
SPD	Beate Schmidt-Kempe	38,925	30.9	▼3.2	35,077	27.7	▼4.4
Greens	Wolfgang Kaiser	9,314	7.4	▼0.2	11,103	8.8	0.0
FDP	Michael Klotzbücher	7,819	6.2	▼1.3	16,300	12.9	▲4.8
Left					4,512	3.6	▲2.8
NPD	Jürgen Schützinger	3,639	2.9		2,127	1.7	▲1.4
PBC	Elfriede Dommert	1,682	1.3	▲0.2	1,170	0.9	▲0.3
REP					1,041	0.8	▼0.1
Familie					1,038	0.8	
GRAUEN					717	0.6	▲0.4
MLPD					158	0.1	
BüSo					99	0.1	▲0.1
Informal votes		3,293			2,900		
Total valid votes		126,095			126,488		
Turnout		129,388	77.2	▼2.7			
CDU hold	Majority	25,791	20.4				
