= Ludger Westrick =

German politician

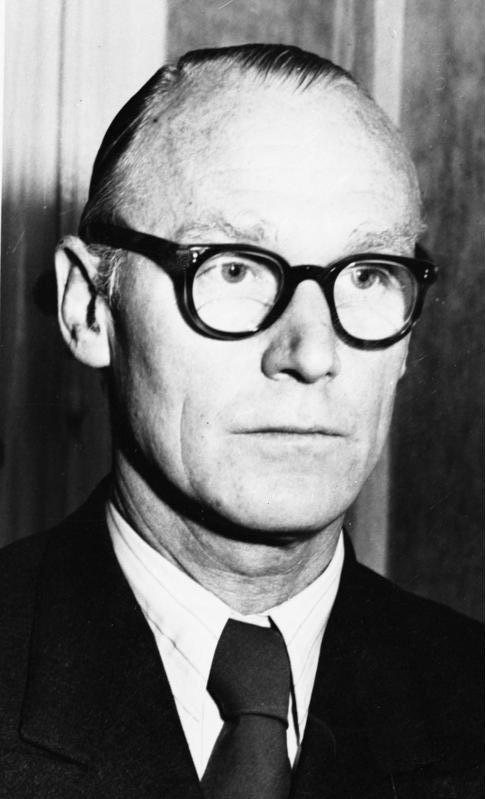
- Westrick in 1959

Head of the German Chancellery
- In office 18 October 1963 – 1 December 1966
- Chancellor: Ludwig Erhard
- Preceded by: Hans Globke
- Succeeded by: Werner Knieper

Minister for Special Affairs
- In office 22 October 1969 – 15 December 1972
- Chancellor: Willy Brandt
- Preceded by: Heinrich Krone
- Succeeded by: Horst Ehmke

Personal details
- Born: Ludger Westrick; 23 October 1894 Münster, German Empire (now Germany)
- Died: 31 July 1990 (aged 95) Bonn, North Rhine-Westphalia, Germany
- Party: Christian Democratic Union

Ludger Westrick (23 October 1894 – 31 July 1990) was a German politician (Christian Democratic Union) who served as Head of the German Chancellery from 1963 to 1966 and as Minister for Special Affairs from 1969 to 1972.
