= Berberich =

Berberich is either a (primary Frankonian) habitational surname for a person from a place with the syllable "-ber-" and the ending "-berg" or an occupational name for a "barber" (from Turkish berber ("barber") via South Slavic Berberić) and may refer to:

- Adolf Berberich (1861–1920), German astronomer
- August Berberich (1912–1982), German politician
- Monika Berberich (born 1942), convicted West German terrorist
