= Gerhard Konow =

German politician (1929–1997)

Head of the Chancellery West Germany
- In office 19 April 1982 – 4 October 1982
- Chancellor: Helmut Schmidt Helmut Kohl
- Preceded by: Manfred Lahnstein
- Succeeded by: Waldemar Schreckenberger

Member of the German Bundesrat West Germany
- In office 27 January 1981 – 11 June 1981
- President: Werner Zeyer

Senator of Federal Affairs of Berlin West Berlin
- In office 23 January 1981 – 11 June 1981
- Governor: Hans-Jochen Vogel
- Preceded by: Gerhard Heimann
- Succeeded by: Norbert Blüm

Personal details
- Born: 16 March 1929 Szczecin, German Reich
- Died: 17 May 1997 (aged 68) Bonn, Germany
- Party: None
- Education: Kiel University University of Marburg
- Occupation: Politician; jurist

Gerhard Konow (16 March 1929 – 17 May 1997) was a German politician and jurist.

== Early life and education ==
Konow was born in Szczecin on 10 March 1929. He studied law and political science at the Universities of Kiel and Marburg from 1948 until 1957 and followed the subsequent legal preparatory service.

== Political career ==
Konow worked in the State Chancellery of Hesse until 1970, first as a consultant and from 1965 as head of department. In August 1970 he moved to the German Chancellery as department head.

In 1981, Konow took up political office: after the Berlin Senate under the leadership of Dietrich Stobbe announced its resignation due to a failed senate reshuffle, the previous Federal Minister of Justice Hans-Jochen Vogel took over the formation of a new state government. At his suggestion, Gerhard Konow was elected Senator for Federal Affairs by the Abgeordnetenhaus of Berlin on 23 January 1981. At the same time, he took on the role of official representative of Berlin at federal level. Since the SPD withdrew from government responsibility in the following snap election to the Abgeordnetenhaus on 10 May 1981, Konow's senatorial office also ended on 11 June 1981 when his successor Norbert Blüm took office. As a senator, Konow was also a full member of the German Bundesrat from 27 January to 11 June 1981.

In September 1981, Konow was again employed by the SPD-led federal government: until 31 March 1982, he was head of the transport policy department in the Federal Ministry of Transport; on 1 April he was appointed State Secretary of this ministry. Due to a cabinet reshuffle in which the head of the German Chancellery, Manfred Lahnstein, was appointed Federal Minister of Finance, Konow took over his previous office just 28 days later. He also became commissioner for the federal intelligence services.

After Chancellor Helmut Schmidt was replaced by Helmut Kohl in a constructive vote of no confidence on 1 October 1982, Konow lost his position as State Secretary three days later. His successor at the head of the German Chancellery was Waldemar Schreckenberger, a confidante of Kohl.

On 1 November 1982, Konow took up his new position as State Secretary in the Ministry of Culture of North Rhine-Westphalia. In 1983, he moved to the Ministry of Science and Research, where he served until his retirement in 1994. This was followed by work as a consultant and representative of the North Rhine-Westphalia state government for the 'Science City of Bonn'.

== Death ==
Gerhard Konow died in Bonn, a few years after his retirement, on 17 May 1997 at the age of 68.

== Non-partisanship ==
Although Gerhard Konow was exclusively employed in SPD-led governments during his career, he remained non-party throughout his life. At the beginning of his term as head of the German Chancellery, he emphasized that he was “not a so-called one, but a truly non-party person."
