= Derya Türk-Nachbaur =

German politician

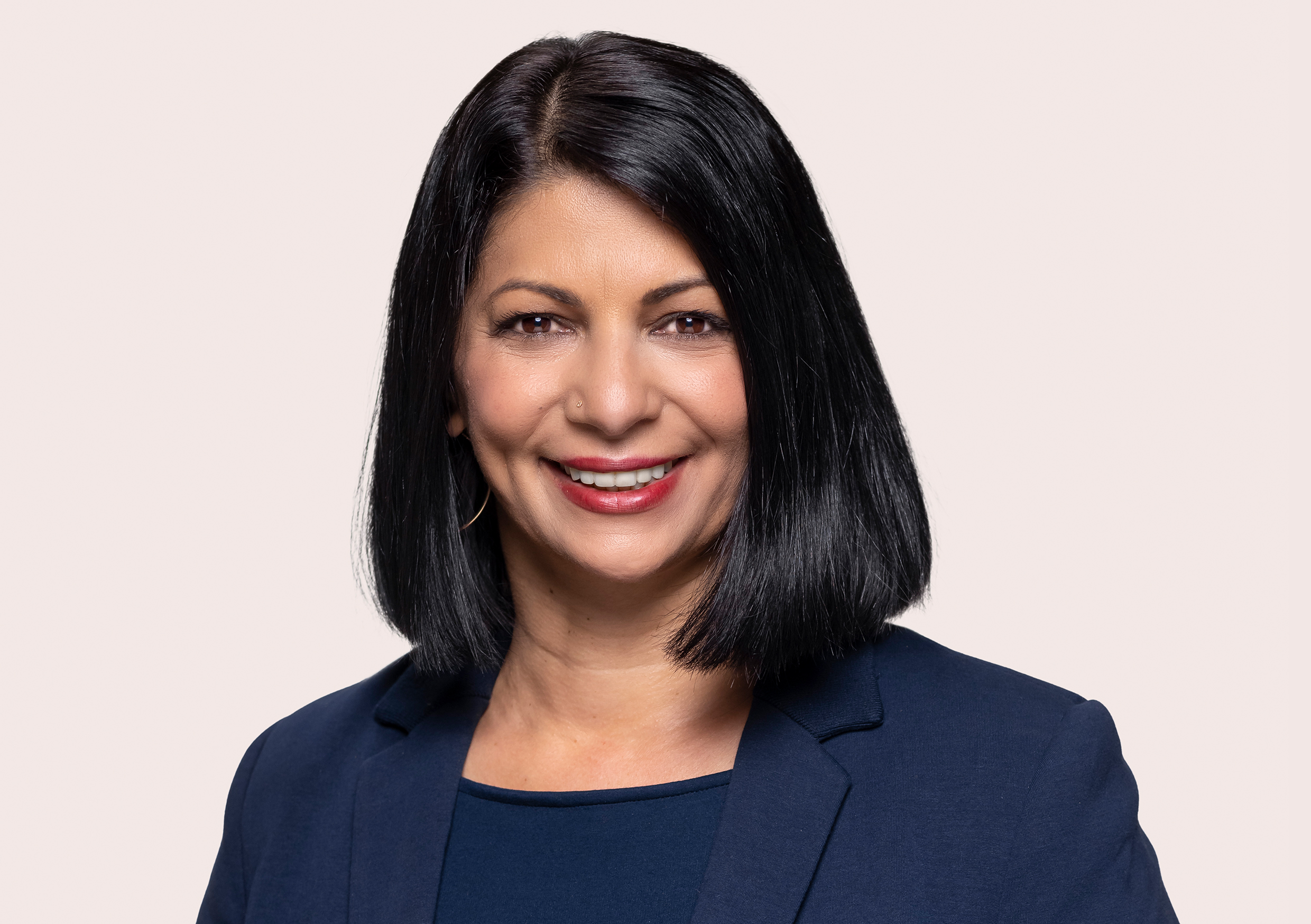

Member of the Bundestag for Baden-Württemberg
- Incumbent
- Assumed office 26 October 2021
- Constituency: Schwarzwald-Baar

Personal details
- Born: 10 April 1973 (age 53) Paderborn, West Germany (now Germany)
- Party: Social Democratic Party of Germany

Derya Türk-Nachbaur (born 10 April 1973, Paderborn) is a German politician of the Social Democratic Party (SPD) who has been serving as a member of the Bundestag since 2021, representing the Schwarzwald-Baar district.

== Political career ==
Türk-Nachbaur is of Turkish origin and entered the Bundestag in the 2021 elections. In parliament, she has since been serving on the Committee on Economic Cooperation and Development and the Committee on Human Rights and Humanitarian Aid. She also joined a study commission set up to investigate the entire period of German involvement in Afghanistan from 2001 to 2021 and to draw lessons for foreign and security policy in future.

In addition to her committee assignments, Türk-Nachbaur has been chairing the German Parliamentary Friendship Group for Cyprus and Malta. She is also a member of the German delegation to the Parliamentary Assembly of the Council of Europe (PACE). In the Assembly, she serves on the Committee on Equality and Non-Discrimination and the Sub-Committee on the Rights of Minorities.

In 2023, Türk-Nachbaur. co-founded the Cross-Party Parliamentary Group on the Situation of the Uyghurs.

Within her parliamentary group, Türk-Nachbaur belongs to the Parliamentary Left, a left-wing movement.

== Other activities ==
- Institute for Foreign Cultural Relations (IFA), Member of the General Meeting (since 2025)
- German Foundation for World Population (DSW), Member of the Parliamentary Advisory Board (2022–2025)
- GIZ, Member of the Board of Trustees (2022–2025)
