= Oskar Wacker =

German politician

Member of the Bundestag; for Tauberbischofsheim
- In office 7 September 1949 – 15 October 1957
- Preceded by: Constituency established
- Succeeded by: August Berberich

Member of the; Landtag of Württemberg-Baden; for Buchen-Tauberbischofsheim
- In office 10 December 1946 – 15 November 1950

Personal details
- Born: 20 October 1898 Eubigheim, Kingdom of Württemberg, German Empire
- Died: 26 August 1972 (aged 73) Bad Mergentheim, Baden-Württemberg, West Germany
- Party: Christian Democratic Union (from 1945)
- Other political affiliations: Centre Party (1922–1933)

Oskar Wacker (20 October 1898 – 26 August 1972) was a German politician of the Christian Democratic Union (CDU) and former member of the German Bundestag.

== Life ==
In 1946, he was a member of the constituent state assembly in Württemberg-Baden and was subsequently a member of the state parliament until 1950. He was a member of the German Bundestag from its first election in 1949 to 1957. In parliament he represented the constituency of Tauberbischofsheim.

== Literature ==
Herbst, Ludolf; Jahn, Bruno (2002). Vierhaus, Rudolf (ed.). Biographisches Handbuch der Mitglieder des Deutschen Bundestages. 1949–2002 [Biographical Handbook of the Members of the German Bundestag. 1949–2002] (in German). München: De Gruyter - De Gruyter Saur. p. 1715. ISBN 978-3-11-184511-1.
