= Odenwald – Tauber =

Electoral constituency represented in the Bundestag

276 Odenwald – Tauber
- Electoral district for the Bundestag
- Odenwald – Tauber in 2025
- State: Baden-Württemberg
- Population: 276,000 (2019)
- Electorate: 209,418 (2021)
- Major settlements: Bad Mergentheim; Mosbach; Wertheim am Main
- Area: 2,430.1 km^{2}

Current electoral district
- Created: 1949
- Party: CDU
- Member: Nina Warken
- Elected: 2021, 2025

Odenwald – Tauber is an electoral constituency (German: Wahlkreis) represented in the Bundestag. It elects one member via first-past-the-post voting. Under the current constituency numbering system, it is designated as constituency 276. It is located in northern Baden-Württemberg, comprising the districts of Main-Tauber-Kreis and Neckar-Odenwald-Kreis.

Odenwald – Tauber was created for the inaugural 1949 federal election. Since 2021, it has been represented by Nina Warken of the Christian Democratic Union (CDU).

== Geography ==
Odenwald – Tauber is located in northern Baden-Württemberg. As of the 2021 federal election, it comprises the districts of Main-Tauber-Kreis and Neckar-Odenwald-Kreis.

== History ==
Odenwald – Tauber was created in 1949, then known as Tauberbischofsheim. It acquired its current name in the 1980 election. In the 1949 election, it was Württemberg-Baden Landesbezirk Baden constituency 8 in the number system. In the 1953 through 1961 elections, it was number 182. In the 1965 through 1976 elections, it was number 185. In the 1980 through 1998 elections, it was number 181. In the 2002 and 2005 elections, it was number 277. Since the 2009 election, it has been number 276.

Originally, the constituency comprised the districts of Tauberbischofsheim and Buchen. In the 1965 through 1976 elections, it comprised the districts of Tauberbischofsheim, Buchen, and Mosbach. It acquired its current borders in the 1980 election.

Election	No.	Name	Borders
1949	8	Tauberbischofsheim	Tauberbischofsheim district; Buchen district
1953	182	Tauberbischofsheim	Tauberbischofsheim district; Buchen district
1957	182	Tauberbischofsheim	Tauberbischofsheim district; Buchen district
1961	182	Tauberbischofsheim	Tauberbischofsheim district; Buchen district
1965	185	Tauberbischofsheim	Tauberbischofsheim district; Buchen district; Mosbach district
1969	185	Tauberbischofsheim	Tauberbischofsheim district; Buchen district; Mosbach district
1972	185	Tauberbischofsheim	Tauberbischofsheim district; Buchen district; Mosbach district
1976	185	Tauberbischofsheim	Tauberbischofsheim district; Buchen district; Mosbach district
1980	181	Odenwald – Tauber	Main-Tauber-Kreis district; Neckar-Odenwald-Kreis district
1983	181	Odenwald – Tauber	Main-Tauber-Kreis district; Neckar-Odenwald-Kreis district
1987	181	Odenwald – Tauber	Main-Tauber-Kreis district; Neckar-Odenwald-Kreis district
1990	181	Odenwald – Tauber	Main-Tauber-Kreis district; Neckar-Odenwald-Kreis district
1994	181	Odenwald – Tauber	Main-Tauber-Kreis district; Neckar-Odenwald-Kreis district
1998	181	Odenwald – Tauber	Main-Tauber-Kreis district; Neckar-Odenwald-Kreis district
2002	277	Odenwald – Tauber	Main-Tauber-Kreis district; Neckar-Odenwald-Kreis district
2005	277	Odenwald – Tauber	Main-Tauber-Kreis district; Neckar-Odenwald-Kreis district
2009	276	Odenwald – Tauber	Main-Tauber-Kreis district; Neckar-Odenwald-Kreis district
2013	276	Odenwald – Tauber	Main-Tauber-Kreis district; Neckar-Odenwald-Kreis district
2017	276	Odenwald – Tauber	Main-Tauber-Kreis district; Neckar-Odenwald-Kreis district
2021	276	Odenwald – Tauber	Main-Tauber-Kreis district; Neckar-Odenwald-Kreis district
2025	276	Odenwald – Tauber	Main-Tauber-Kreis district; Neckar-Odenwald-Kreis district

== Members ==
The constituency has been held continuously by the Christian Democratic Union (CDU) since its creation. It was first represented by Oskar Wacker from 1949 to 1957, followed by August Berberich from 1957 to 1969. Karl Miltner was representative from 1969 to 1990. Siegfried Hornung then served from 1990 to 2002. He was succeeded by Kurt Segner from 2002 to 2009. Alois Gerig was elected in 2009, and re-elected in 2013 and 2017. He was succeeded by Nina Warken in 2021.

Election	Member	Party	%
1949	Oskar Wacker	CDU	48.9
1953	Oskar Wacker	CDU	63.4
1957	August Berberich	CDU	71.4
1961	August Berberich	CDU	67.1
1965	August Berberich	CDU	65.6
1969	Karl Miltner	CDU	60.7
1972	Karl Miltner	CDU	61.5
1976	Karl Miltner	CDU	63.5
1980	Karl Miltner	CDU	60.8
1983	Karl Miltner	CDU	65.6
1987	Karl Miltner	CDU	60.1
1990	Siegfried Hornung	CDU	58.0
1994	Siegfried Hornung	CDU	54.8
1998	Siegfried Hornung	CDU	49.9
2002	Kurt Segner	CDU	53.3
2005	Kurt Segner	CDU	53.9
2009	Alois Gerig	CDU	50.3
2013	Alois Gerig	CDU	59.1
2017	Alois Gerig	CDU	46.9
2021	Nina Warken	CDU	35.8
2025	Nina Warken	CDU	42.8

== Election results ==
=== 2025 election ===
Federal election (2025): Odenwald – Tauber
Notes:	Blue background denotes the winner of the electorate vote. Pink background denotes a candidate elected from their party list. Yellow background denotes an electorate win by a list member, or other incumbent. A ✓ or ✗ denotes status of any incumbent, win or lose respectively.						
Party	Candidate	Votes	%	±%	Party votes	%	±%
CDU	✓ Nina Warken	72,796	42.8	▲7.0	61,951	36.4	▲5.4
AfD	Johann Martel	39,072	23.0	▲10.9	40,149	23.6	▲11.6
SPD	Philipp Hensinger	24,015	14.1	▼6.5	22,572	13.3	▼8.9
Greens	Horst Berger	13,335	7.8	▼3.2	14,283	8.4	▼2.7
Left	Robert Binder	7,689	4.5	▲2.2	8,330	4.9	▲2.3
FW	Eberhard Leutz	5,757	3.4	▼1.2	3,245	1.9	▼1.0
FDP	Mirwais Wafa	5,336	3.1	▼6.6	8,157	4.8	▼8.3
dieBasis	Elisabeth Beck	1,892	1.1	▼1.1	698	0.4	▼1.3
Tierschutzpartei					1,475	0.9	▼0.3
PARTEI				▼1.6	698	0.4	▼0.6
ÖDP					437	0.3	▼0.1
Pirates							▼0.3
Volt					778	0.5	▲0.2
Team Todenhöfer							▼0.2
Bündnis C					235	0.1	0.0
Gesundheitsforschung							▼0.2
BD					196	0.1	
Bürgerbewegung							▼0.4
Humanists							▼0.1
BSW					7,098	4.2	
MLPD					31	0.0	0.0
Informal votes		1,520			1,079		
Total valid votes		169,892			170,333		
Turnout		171,412	83.0	▲5.6			
CDU hold	Majority			▲7.0			

=== 2021 election ===
Federal election (2021): Odenwald – Tauber
Notes:	Blue background denotes the winner of the electorate vote. Pink background denotes a candidate elected from their party list. Yellow background denotes an electorate win by a list member, or other incumbent. A ✓ or ✗ denotes status of any incumbent, win or lose respectively.						
Party	Candidate	Votes	%	±%	Party votes	%	±%
CDU	Nina Warken	57,391	35.8	▼11.0	48,866	30.4	▼9.4
SPD	Anja Lotz	33,083	20.6	▲1.5	35,578	22.2	▲5.3
AfD	Christina Baum	19,374	12.1	▼1.5	19,208	12.0	▼1.9
Greens	Charlotte Schneidewind-Hartnagel	17,695	11.0	▲4.2	17,748	11.1	▲2.6
FDP	Timo Breuninger	15,549	9.7	▲2.6	20,943	13.0	▲2.2
FW	Stefan Grimm	7,329	4.6		4,701	2.9	▲2.1
Left	Robert Binder	3,722	2.3	▼2.9	4,084	2.5	▼3.0
dieBasis	Dieter Schwarz	3,473	2.2		2,724	1.7	
Tierschutzpartei					1,911	1.2	▲0.4
PARTEI	Dominik Leuser	2,636	1.6		1,563	1.0	▲0.4
ÖDP					590	0.4	▼0.3
Pirates					510	0.3	0.0
Volt					388	0.2	
Team Todenhöfer					345	0.2	
Bündnis C					270	0.2	
Gesundheitsforschung					260	0.2	
NPD					246	0.2	▼0.3
Bürgerbewegung					195	0.1	
Humanists					127	0.1	
DiB					99	0.1	0.0
Bündnis 21					60	0.0	
LKR					42	0.0	
MLPD					23	0.0	0.0
DKP					13	0.0	0.0
Informal votes		1,806			1,564		
Total valid votes		160,252			160,494		
Turnout		162,058	77.4	▼0.1			
CDU hold	Majority	24,308	15.2	▼12.5			

=== 2017 election ===
Federal election (2017): Odenwald – Tauber
Notes:	Blue background denotes the winner of the electorate vote. Pink background denotes a candidate elected from their party list. Yellow background denotes an electorate win by a list member, or other incumbent. A ✓ or ✗ denotes status of any incumbent, win or lose respectively.						
Party	Candidate	Votes	%	±%	Party votes	%	±%
CDU	✓ Alois Gerig	75,531	46.8	▼12.3	64,208	39.8	▼12.1
SPD	Dorothee Schlegel	30,849	19.1	▼2.2	27,175	16.9	▼2.9
AfD	Christina Baum	21,849	13.6	▲9.5	22,289	13.8	▲8.6
FDP	Carina Schmidt	11,419	7.1	▲5.3	17,564	10.9	▲5.7
Greens	Charlotte Schneidewind-Hartnagel (Note: Schneidewind-Hartnagel entered the Bundestag on the Greens list after the resignation of Kerstin Andreae in November 2019.)	11,090	6.9	▲1.0	13,642	8.5	▲1.3
Left	Rolf Grüning	8,422	5.2	▲1.9	8,907	5.5	▲1.4
FW					1,300	0.8	▲0.2
Tierschutzpartei					1,282	0.8	0.0
ÖDP	Herbert Gebhardt	2,063	1.3	▲0.3	1,102	0.7	0.0
PARTEI					984	0.6	
NPD					654	0.4	▼0.9
Pirates					564	0.3	▼1.6
Tierschutzallianz					387	0.2	
DM					323	0.2	
Menschliche Welt					214	0.1	
V-Partei³					193	0.1	
BGE					190	0.1	
DiB					140	0.1	
MLPD					43	0.0	0.0
DIE RECHTE					42	0.0	
DKP					22	0.0	
Informal votes		2,116			2,114		
Total valid votes		161,223			161,225		
Turnout		163,339	77.5	▲4.6			
CDU hold	Majority	44,682	27.7	▼10.1			

=== 2013 election ===
Federal election (2013): Odenwald – Tauber
Notes:	Blue background denotes the winner of the electorate vote. Pink background denotes a candidate elected from their party list. Yellow background denotes an electorate win by a list member, or other incumbent. A ✓ or ✗ denotes status of any incumbent, win or lose respectively.						
Party	Candidate	Votes	%	±%	Party votes	%	±%
CDU	✓ Alois Gerig	90,624	59.1	▲8.9	79,516	51.9	▲9.9
SPD	Dorothee Schlegel	32,696	21.3	▲1.3	30,269	19.8	▲1.3
Greens	Hans-Detlef Ott	9,019	5.9	▼2.9	10,984	7.2	▼2.0
AfD	Uwe Wanke	6,280	4.1		7,994	5.2	
Left	Volker Bohn	5,158	3.4	▼3.2	6,379	4.2	▼2.7
Pirates	Susanna von Dewitz	2,968	1.9		3,049	2.0	▲0.2
FDP	Ulrike Quoos	2,807	1.8	▼9.6	7,956	5.2	▼11.7
NPD	Tobias Erdmann	2,177	1.4	▼0.5	2,023	1.3	0.0
Tierschutzpartei					1,199	0.8	0.0
ÖDP	Johannes Zimmerer	1,556	1.0	0.0	1,030	0.7	▼0.1
FW					911	0.6	
REP					615	0.4	▼0.5
RENTNER					386	0.3	
Volksabstimmung					299	0.2	0.0
PBC					213	0.1	▼0.2
PRO					149	0.1	
Party of Reason					141	0.1	
BIG					75	0.0	
MLPD					34	0.0	0.0
BüSo					24	0.0	0.0
Informal votes		2,300			2,339		
Total valid votes		153,285			153,246		
Turnout		155,585	72.9	▲1.9			
CDU hold	Majority	57,928	37.8	▲7.5			

=== 2009 election ===
Federal election (2009): Odenwald – Tauber
Notes:	Blue background denotes the winner of the electorate vote. Pink background denotes a candidate elected from their party list. Yellow background denotes an electorate win by a list member, or other incumbent. A ✓ or ✗ denotes status of any incumbent, win or lose respectively.						
Party	Candidate	Votes	%	±%	Party votes	%	±%
CDU	Alois Gerig	75,337	50.3	▼3.6	63,120	42.0	▼4.7
SPD	Gabriele Teichmann	29,977	20.0	▼9.9	27,740	18.5	▼9.0
FDP	Carina Schmidt	17,199	11.5	▲7.5	25,455	16.9	▲6.3
Greens	Christine Denz	13,173	8.8	▲3.8	13,770	9.2	▲2.4
Left	Rolf Grüning	9,821	6.6	▲3.5	10,357	6.9	▲3.3
Pirates					2,648	1.8	
NPD	Wolfgang Wüst	2,876	1.9	▼0.1	2,015	1.3	▼0.1
REP					1,415	0.9	▼0.2
ÖDP	Anita Spinner	1,538	1.0		1,156	0.8	
Tierschutzpartei					1,139	0.8	
PBC					502	0.3	▼0.1
Volksabstimmung					332	0.2	
DIE VIOLETTEN					274	0.2	
DVU					125	0.1	
BüSo					98	0.1	0.0
MLPD					59	0.0	0.0
ADM					51	0.0	
Informal votes		3,375			3,040		
Total valid votes		149,921			150,256		
Turnout		153,296	71.0	▼6.9			
CDU hold	Majority	45,360	30.3	▲6.3			

=== 2005 election ===
Federal election (2005):Odenwald – Tauber
Notes:	Blue background denotes the winner of the electorate vote. Pink background denotes a candidate elected from their party list. Yellow background denotes an electorate win by a list member, or other incumbent. A ✓ or ✗ denotes status of any incumbent, win or lose respectively.						
Party	Candidate	Votes	%	±%	Party votes	%	±%
CDU	✓ Kurt Segner	88,525	53.9	▲0.6	77,032	46.7	▼4.9
SPD	Thomas Kraft	49,188	29.9	▼4.4	45,318	27.5	▼2.4
Greens	Tobias Stindl	8,170	5.0	▲0.5	11,157	6.8	▼0.7
FDP	Stefan Kozole	6,585	4.0	▼2.0	17,525	10.6	▲4.1
Left	Burkhard Malotke	5,048	3.1		5,848	3.5	▲2.9
Familie	Thomas Mütsch	3,461	2.1		2,245	1.4	
NPD	Wolfgang Wüst	3,291	2.0		2,388	1.4	▲1.1
REP					1,868	1.1	▼0.1
PBC					658	0.4	
GRAUEN					569	0.3	▲0.2
BüSo					96	0.1	
MLPD					82	0.0	
Informal votes		4,112			3,594		
Total valid votes		164,268			164,786		
Turnout		168,380	77.9	▼3.0			
CDU hold	Majority	39,337	24				
