= Bundesverband der Deutschen Luft- und Raumfahrtindustrie =

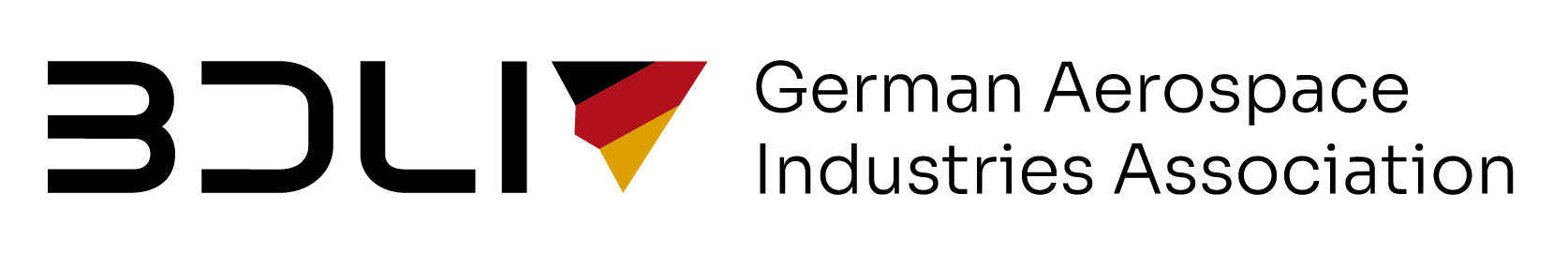
German Aerospace Industries Association; Bundesverband der Deutschen Luft- und Raumfahrtindustrie e.V. (BDLI)

The German Aerospace Industries Association (BDLI) is the association of the German aerospace industry and represents companies and institutions in the aerospace sector. The BDLI is a registered association based in Berlin. It is accredited to the German Bundestag and enrolled in the federal lobbying register.

Legal form	Registered association
Foundation	1951
Headquarters	Berlin
President	Michael Schoellhorn
Principal managing director	Marie-Christine von Hahn
Members	over 260 (2024)
Website	www.BDLI.de/en

== Organisation ==
Membership is organized into forums and specialized committees. The BDLI executive board includes the president, the vice presidents, the SME representative, the treasurer and the principal managing director. Its president is Michael Schoellhorn, and Marie-Christine von Hahn has been its principal managing director since 2024.

The head office comprises three specialist departments: Aviation, Defence & Security and Space.

The association is a member of the Federation of German Industries (BDI) and the AeroSpace and Defence Industries Association of Europe (ASD), a European umbrella organization representing the interests of the aerospace and defence industries. Its partner organisations also include the Groupement des industries françaises aéronautiques et spatiales (GIFAS) association in France.

== Membership ==
Any German company involved in aspects of aerospace can become a full member (Ordentliche Mitglieder). Suppliers and equipment companies active in the aerospace sector can also join the association as full members. Legal entities and natural persons who regularly pay membership fees to the BDLI can become sustaining members (Fördernde Mitglieder).

== History ==
On March 17, 1911, the Verein Deutscher Flugzeugindustrieller (later the Verband Deutscher Flugzeug-Industrieller GmbH) was founded. The founders were Albatros Flugzeugwerke, Aviatik GmbH, Dorner Flugzeuge GmbH, Flugmaschine Wright-Gesellschaft mbH, Euler-Flugmaschinenwerke, Grade-Fliegerwerke, Harlan-Flugzeugwerke and Rumpler-Flugzeugwerke AG.

From 1917, the association was a member of the Kriegsverband der Flugzeugindustrie e. V., an initiative of the Inspection of the Air Force (IdFlieg) with 120 companies and 125,000 employees (monthly production of 2,000 aircraft). In 1921, the association was merged with the Verein Deutscher Motorfahrzeug-Industrieller to form the Verband Deutscher Luftfahrzeug-Industrieller GmbH. The association was liquidated on September 17, 1923, and re-established on October 30, 1923, as the Verband Deutscher Luftfahrzeughersteller e. V. In 1927, the association was again dissolved and re-established as the Reichsverband der Deutschen Luftfahrt-Industrie (RDLI), and later reconstituted after the withdrawal of Luft-Hansa in 1929.

During the National Socialist era, the association was incorporated into the Main Group II of the German economy as an independent economic group. After the Second World War, the association was renamed Verband der Deutschen Luftfahrt e. V. in 1951, but had to change its name to Verband zur Förderung der Luftfahrt e. V. (VFL) one year later. With the sovereignty of the Federal Republic of Germany in 1955 and its return to control of its airspace, the association was transformed into the Bundesverband der Deutschen Luftfahrtindustrie e. V. (BDLI).

== Organiser ==
The association is the trademark owner of the ILA Berlin air show, which is held every two years. Among its partners is Messe Berlin GmbH.

== Medienpreis Luft- und Raumfahrt ==
The Medienpreis Luft- und Raumfahrt recognizes contributions by nonspecialist journalists that make the subject of aerospace accessible to a wide audience. The award is given annually in the categories of print, radio, television and online. Additionally, a special award is given in the category local/regional newspaper and to 'up-and-coming' authors under the age of 30.

== Chairperson ==
- 1911–1927: August Euler
- 1927–1929: Enno Walther Huth
- 1929–1951: Rudolf Lahs
- 1951–1954: Fritz Jastrow (resigned at the insistence of Ernst Heinkel)
- 1955–1963: Leo Rothe
- 1963–1971: Karl Thalau
- 1971–: Bernhard Weinhardt
- Werner Knieper
- Claude Dornier
- 1976–1982: Ludwig Bölkow
- 1984–1985: Ernst Zimmermann
- 1985–1988: Otto Greve
- 1988–: Hanns Arnt Vogels
- –1993: Karl Dersch
- 1993–1996: Wolfgang Piller
- 1996–1998: Manfred Bischoff
- 1998–2001: Gustav Humbert
- 2001–2005: Rainer Hertrich
- 2005–2012: Thomas Enders
- 2012–2013: Lutz Bertling
- 2013–2016: Bernhard Gerwert
- 2017–2019: Klaus Richter
- 2020–2021: Dirk Hoke
- since 2021: Michael Schoellhorn

== Weblink ==
- Website of BDLI
- Winners of the Medienpreis für Luft- und Raumfahrt
