= Thorsten Frei =

German politician (born 1973)

Thorsten Frei MdB
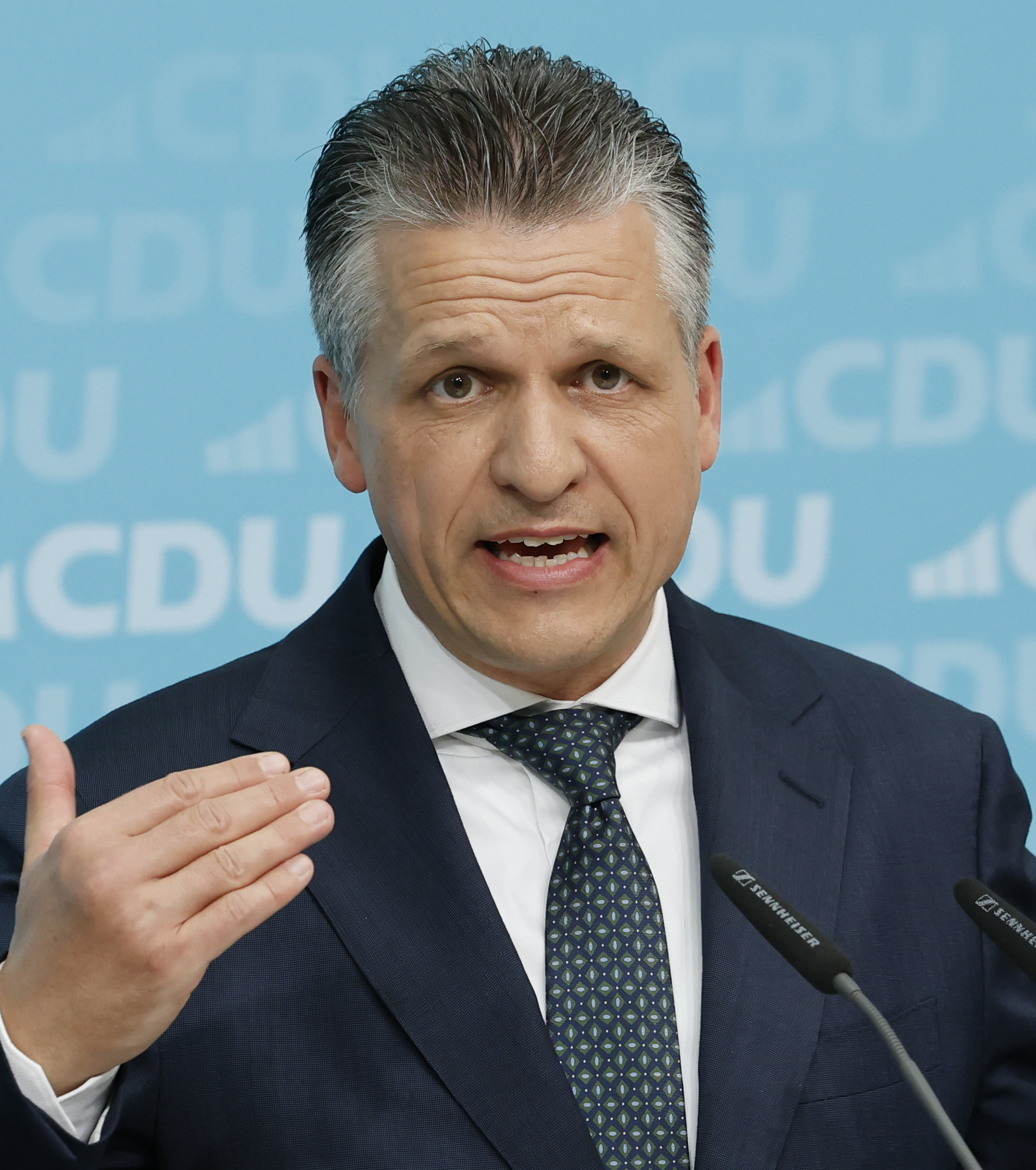
- Frei in 2023

Leader of the CDU/CSU in the Bundestag
- Incumbent
- Assumed office 29 July 2026
- First Deputy: Alexander Hoffmann
- Chief Whip: Catarina dos Santos-Wintz
- Preceded by: Jens Spahn

Head of the Chancellery Minister for Special Affairs
- In office 6 May 2025 – 29 July 2026
- Chancellor: Friedrich Merz
- Preceded by: Wolfgang Schmidt
- Succeeded by: Nina Warken

Chief Whip of the CDU/CSU group in the Bundestag
- In office 15 December 2021 – 5 May 2025
- Leader: Ralph Brinkhaus; Friedrich Merz
- Preceded by: Michael Grosse-Brömer
- Succeeded by: Steffen Bilger

Member of the Bundestag; for Schwarzwald-Baar
- Incumbent
- Assumed office 22 October 2013
- Preceded by: Siegfried Kauder

Mayor of Donaueschingen
- In office 2004–2013
- Preceded by: Bernhard Everke
- Succeeded by: Erik Pauly

Personal details
- Born: 8 August 1973 (age 53) Säckingen, West Germany
- Party: Christian Democratic Union
- Children: 3
- Education: University of Freiburg
- Occupation: Lawyer • Professor • Politician

Military service
- Allegiance: Germany
- Branch/service: Bundeswehr
- Years of service: 1993–1994
- Unit: Franco-German Brigade

Thorsten Frei (born 8 August 1973) is a German lawyer and politician of the Christian Democratic Union (CDU) who served as Head of the Federal Chancellery in the government of Chancellor Friedrich Merz from May 2025 to July 2026.

Frei has been serving as a member of the Bundestag from the state of Baden-Württemberg since 2013.

== Political career ==
Frei became mayor of Donaueschingen in 2004, a position he relinquished when he first became a member of the Bundestag in the 2013 German federal election. From 2013 until 2017, he was a member of the Committee on European Affairs, the Committee on Foreign Affairs and its Subcommittee on Civilian Crisis Prevention.

From 2018 to 2021, Frei served as deputy chairman of the CDU/CSU parliamentary group, under the leadership of chairman Volker Kauder. In this capacity, he coordinated the group's legislative activities on consumer protection, domestic affairs, sports, and minorities. He also served on the Committee on the Election of Judges (Wahlausschuss), which is in charge of appointing judges to the Federal Constitutional Court of Germany.

From 2021 to 2025, Frei was his parliamentary group's chief whip, under the leadership of successive chairs Ralph Brinkhaus (2021–2022) and Friedrich Merz (2022–2025).

In addition to his committee assignments, Frei chaired the German-Swiss Parliamentary Friendship Group.

== Other activities ==
- Munich Security Conference Foundation, Member of the Foundation Council (2025–2026)
- Center for International Peace Operations (ZIF), Member of the Supervisory Board (2018–2019)
- Federal Agency for Civic Education (BPB), Member of the Board of Trustees
