= Nina Warken =

German politician (born 1979)

Nina Warken MdB
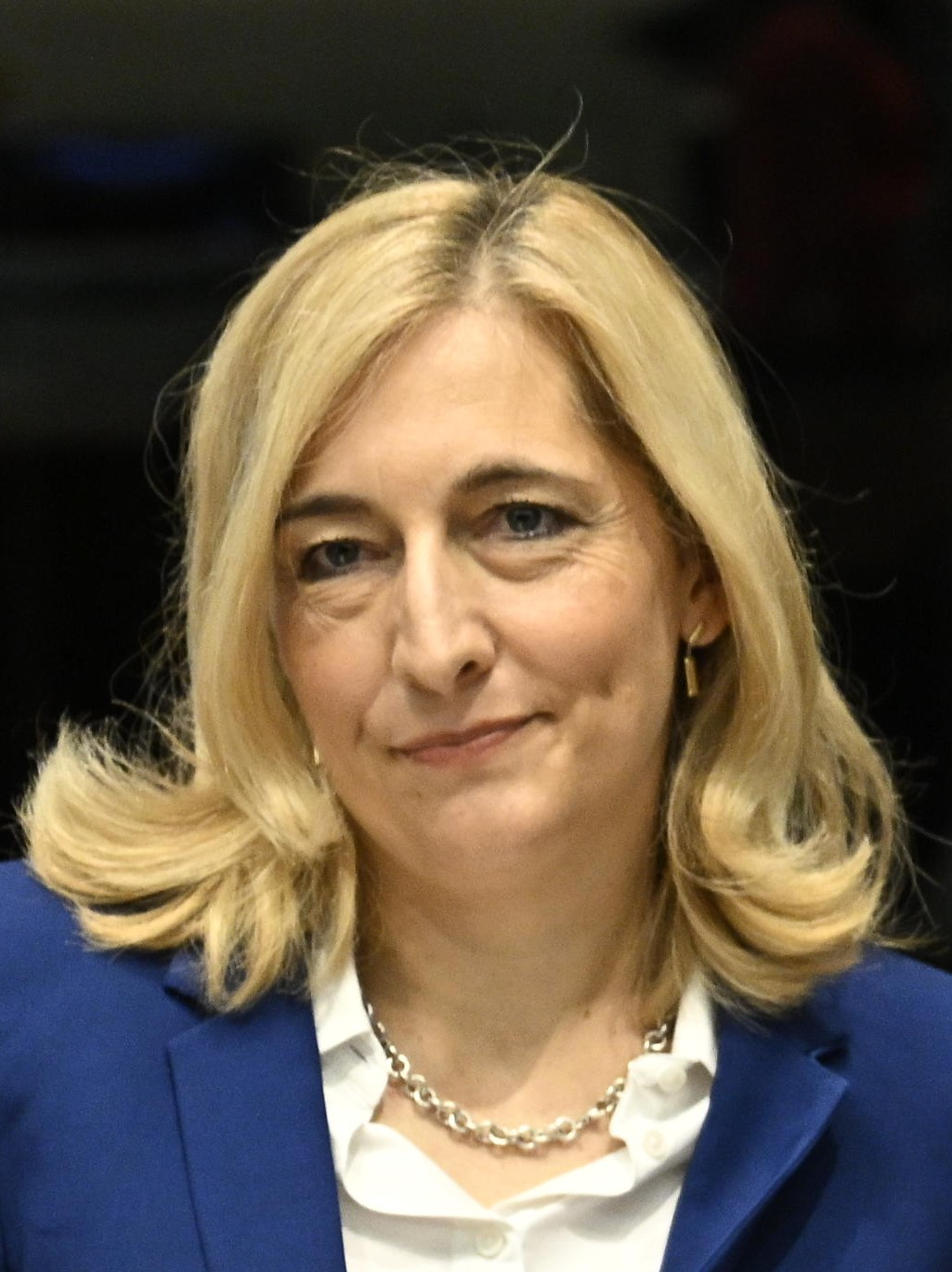
- Warken in 2025

Head of the Chancellery Minister for Special Affairs
- Incumbent
- Assumed office 29 July 2026
- Chancellor: Friedrich Merz
- Preceded by: Thorsten Frei

Minister of Health
- In office 6 May 2025 – 29 July 2026
- Chancellor: Friedrich Merz
- Preceded by: Karl Lauterbach
- Succeeded by: Carsten Linnemann

Member of the Bundestag for Baden-Württemberg
- Incumbent
- Assumed office 26 October 2021
- Preceded by: Alois Gerig
- Constituency: Odenwald – Tauber
- In office 5 December 2018 – 26 October 2021
- Preceded by: Stephan Harbarth
- Succeeded by: multi-member district
- Constituency: Christian Democratic Union list, №4
- In office 22 October 2013 – 24 October 2017
- Preceded by: multi-member district
- Succeeded by: multi-member district
- Constituency: Christian Democratic Union list, №14

Personal details
- Born: Nina Bender; 15 May 1979 (age 47) Bad Mergentheim, Baden-Württemberg, West Germany (now Germany)
- Party: Christian Democratic Union (since 2002)
- Children: 3
- Education: University of Heidelberg
- Occupation: Politician

Nina Ingrid Warken (née Bender; born 15 May 1979) is a German lawyer and politician of the Christian Democratic Union (CDU) who has served as Head of the German Chancellery (Chief of Staff) and Federal Minister for Special Affairs since July 2026. Previously, she served as Federal Minister of Health in the government of Chancellor Friedrich Merz from May 2025 to July 2026. She has been a member of the Bundestag representing the state of Baden-Württemberg from 2013 to 2017 and again since 2018.

== Political career ==
=== Early beginnings ===
Warken joined the CDU in 2002. From 2006 to 2014, she served as deputy chair of the Young Union (JU), the CDU's youth organization, under the leadership of its chairman Philipp Mißfelder.

=== Member of the German Parliament, 2013–present ===
Warken first became member of the Bundestag after the 2013 German federal election. She lost her seat in the 2017 German federal election, but was the first in line if a Member for Baden-Württemberg resigned. This happened on 23 November 2018, when Stephan Harbarth was elected President of the Federal Constitutional Court of Germany. She took her seat on 5 December 2018.

In parliament, Warken has served on the Committee on Internal Affairs (2013–2017; 2020–2025), the Committee on European Affairs (2018), the Committee on Legal Affairs and Consumer Protection (2018–2025), and the parliamentary monitoring group for the COVID-19 pandemic in Germany (2021–2022). On the Committee on Internal Affairs, she was her parliamentary group's rapporteur on volunteering, civil protection and disaster response.

In the negotiations to form a coalition government under the leadership of Minister-President of Baden-Württemberg Winfried Kretschmann following the 2021 state elections, Warken co-chaired the working group on integration, alongside Manfred Lucha.

From 2022 to 2025, Warken also served on the German Parliament's body in charge of appointing judges to the Highest Courts of Justice, namely the Federal Court of Justice (BGH), the Federal Administrative Court (BVerwG), the Federal Fiscal Court (BFH), the Federal Labour Court (BAG), and the Federal Social Court (BSG).

From 2022 to 2023, Warken co-chaired – alongside Johannes Fechner – the Commission for the Reform of the Electoral Law and the Modernization of Parliamentary Work.

From 2023 to 2025, Warken served as Secretary General of the CDU in Baden-Württemberg, under the leadership of chairman Manuel Hagel.

In the negotiations to form a Grand Coalition of Friedrich Merz's Christian Democrats (CDU together with the Bavarian CSU) and the Social Democratic Party (SPD) following the 2025 German elections, Warken was part of the CDU/CSU delegation in the working group on domestic policy, legal affairs, migration and integration, led by Günter Krings, Andrea Lindholz and Dirk Wiese.

Also since 2025, Warken has been leading the Christian Democrats' Women's Union; in this capacity, she is part of the CDU's national board.

== Political positions ==
In June 2017, Warken voted against Germany's introduction of same-sex marriage.

Warken supports a criminal ban on buying sex but not selling sex.

== Other activities ==
- Munich Security Conference Foundation, Member of the Foundation Council (since 2026)
- Rotary International, Member
- Technisches Hilfswerk (THW), President of the Baden-Württemberg Chapter (2015–2023)

== Personal life ==
Warken is married to lawyer Sebastian Warken. The couple has three sons. In her free time, Warken plays tennis.
