= Herdrich =

Herdrich (her-jrik) is derived from the Old High German "hart", meaning "strong" or "powerful", and the Germanic word "rik", denoting a "king". "prince", or "ruler".

The earliest recorded date of the family name Herdrich was in 1296. The origin of the family name Herdrich is Northern Germany and Southern Denmark. To date most Herdrich families live in America but are descendants of Germany. Other families came to America from England, Bohemia, Australia, Ansbach, and Rust. The majority of the families immigrated to the United States in the late 1880s. The ports from which they left to come to America were; Bremen, Germany, Liverpool, England, Hamburg, Germany and Le Havre, France. Once in the United States the Herdrich families mainly lived in the midwest in Indiana, Illinois, Michigan, Ohio, Pennsylvania, New York, and New Jersey.

== People ==
- Pegram v. Herdrich, 530 U.S. 211 (2000), a United States Supreme Court case
- Christian Wolfgang Herdtrich (1625, Graz - 1684), an Austrian Jesuit missionary
- Jan Hertrich-Woleński (born 1940), a Polish philosopher
- Rainer Hertrich (born 1949), one of the two current CEOs of EADS, and also head of the group's Aeronautic s Division
- Stefan Hertrich, the lead vocalist and composer
- Hertrichocereus
