= Meinrad Belle =

German politician (1943–2015)

Member of the Bundestag; for Schwarzwald-Baar
- In office 20 December 1990 – 17 October 2002
- Preceded by: Hansjörg Häfele
- Succeeded by: Siegfried Kauder

Personal details
- Born: 18 July 1943 Philippsburg, Germany
- Died: 4 December 2015 (aged 72)
- Party: Christian Democratic Union

Meinrad Belle (1943–2015) was a German politician (CDU) and former member of the German Bundestag.

== Life ==
From 1975 to 1990 he was mayor of the community of Brigachtal in the Schwarzwald-Baar district and from 1990 to 2002 member of the German Bundestag.
