= Marcel Klinge =

German politician

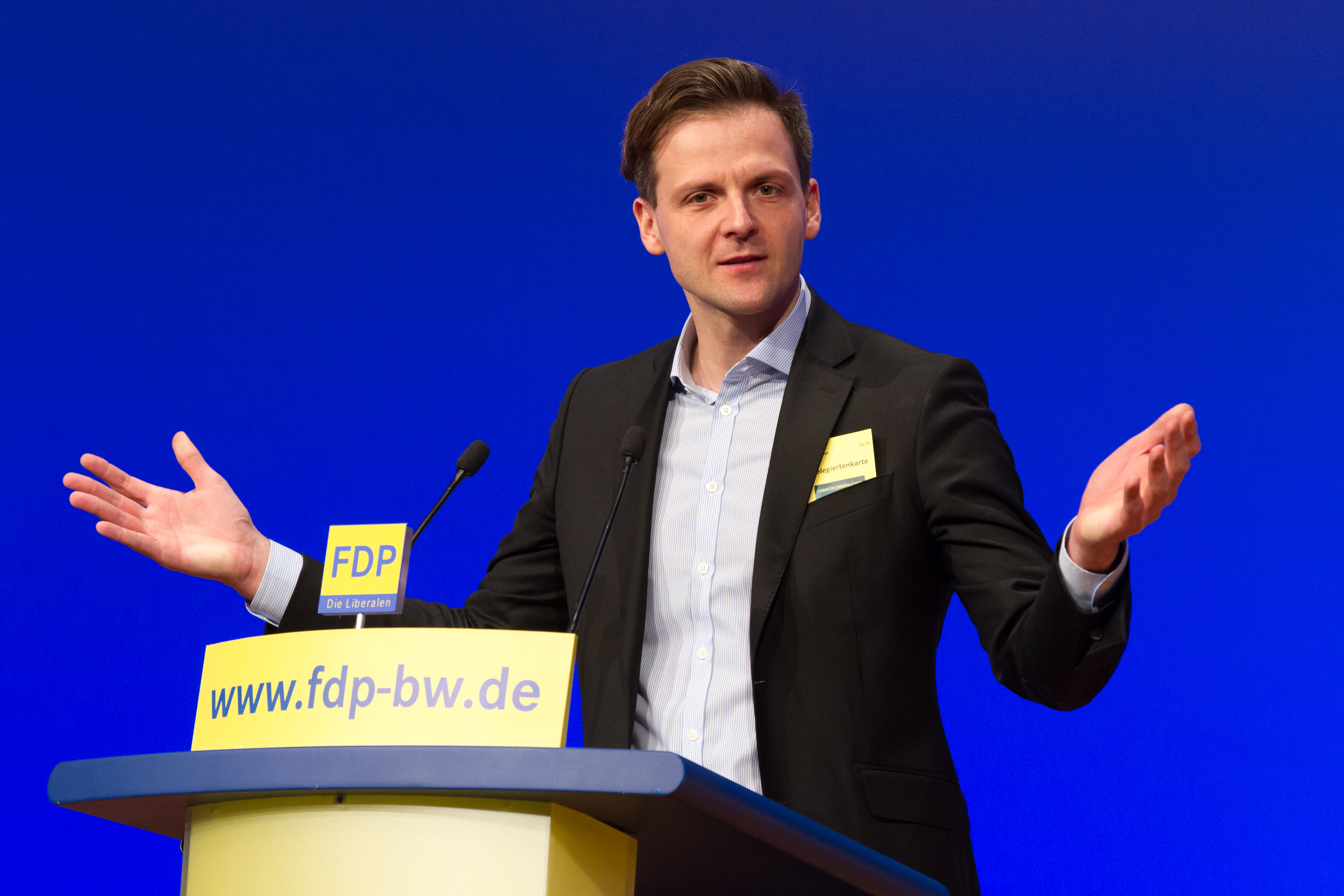
- Portrait of Marvel Klinge at the 112th regular party convention of the FDP Baden-Württemberg in Stuttgart on 5 January 2015

Member of the Bundestag
- In office 2017–2021

Personal details
- Born: 4 December 1980 (age 45) Apolda, East Germany (now Germany)
- Party: FDP

Marcel Klinge (born 4 December 1980) is a German politician of the Free Democratic Party (FDP) who served as a member of the Bundestag from the state of Baden-Württemberg from 2017 until 2021.

== Life ==
In 2012, Klinge received his doctorate on "Islam and Integration Policy of German Federal Governments after 11 September 2001" at the Humboldt University of Berlin. There he studied politics and sociology from 2002 to 2007 and graduated with a master's degree in social sciences. Klinge joined the FDP in 2001.

Klinge became member of the Bundestag after the 2017 German federal election. He was a member of the Committee for Economy and Energy and the Committee for Tourism. He was spokesman for tourism policy of the FDP parliamentary group in the Bundestag.

He lost his seat at the 2021 German federal election.
