= Alois Gerig =

German politician

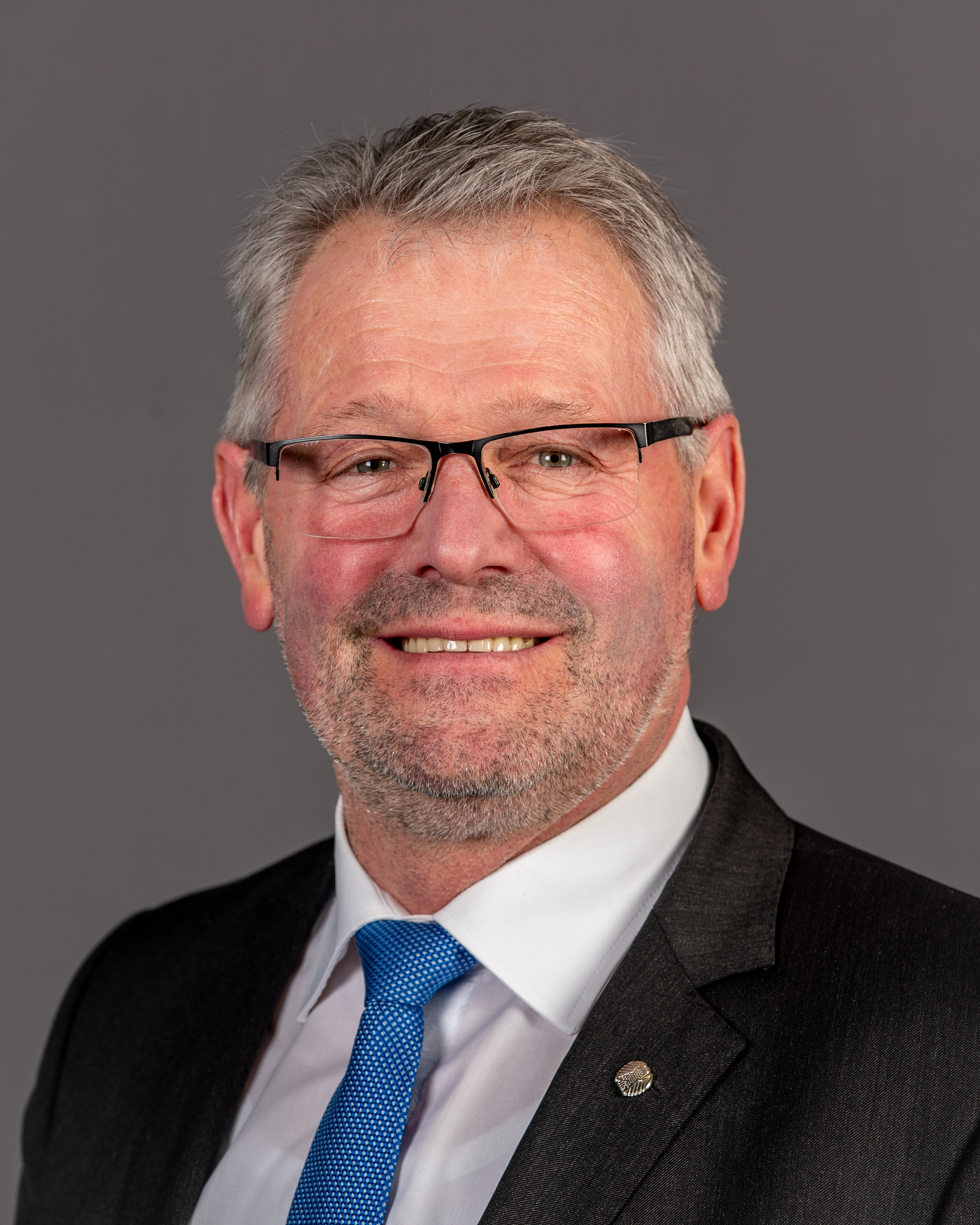
- Gerig in 2020

Member of the Bundestag; for Odenwald – Tauber
- In office 27 October 2009 – 26 October 2021
- Preceded by: Kurt Segner
- Succeeded by: Nina Warken

Personal details
- Born: 30 January 1956 (age 70) Höpfingen, West Germany
- Party: Christian Democratic Union
- Children: 3

Alois Gerig (born 30 January 1956) is a German politician of the Christian Democratic Union (CDU) who served as a member of the Bundestag from the state of Baden-Württemberg from 2009 until 2021.

== Political career ==
Gering became a member of the Bundestag after the 2009 German federal election. In parliament, he was a member of the Committee on Food and Agriculture, which he chaired from 2015.

In July 2020, Gering announced that he would not stand in the 2021 federal elections but instead resign from active politics by the end of the parliamentary term.

== Life after politics ==
Since 2023, Gering has been serving as chairman of the German Bioethanol Industry Association (BDBe).
