= Manfred Schüler =

German politician (1932–2025)

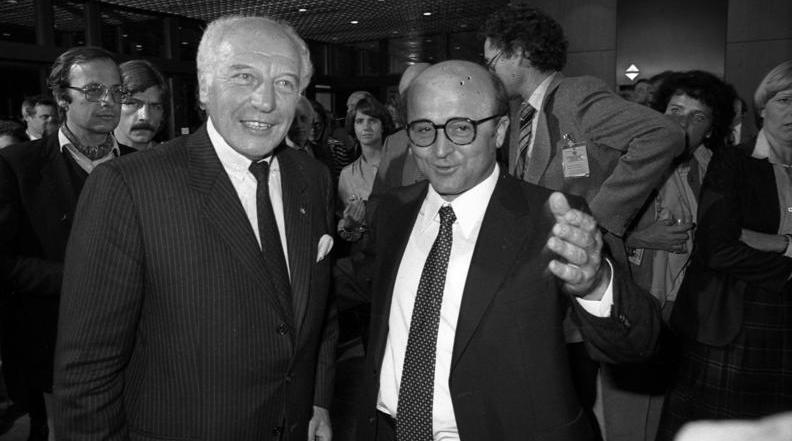
Schüler (right) and Walter Scheel

Manfred Schüler (7 March 1932 – 8 April 2025) was a German financial and management expert and politician (SPD).

After teaching management and business studies activities at several scientific institutes and the private sector, from 1958 he was a member of the SPD for issues of financial reform in the Bundestag.

After the change of government in 1969, he became head of the German Chancellery from 1974 to 1980 under Chancellor Helmut Schmidt. In 1999, he became the last Chairman of the Board of Directors of the Federal Institute for Unification (BvS), and then from 2000 to 2003, Chairman of the Board of TLG.

Schüler died on 8 April 2025, at the age of 93.
