= August Berberich =

German politician (1912–1982)

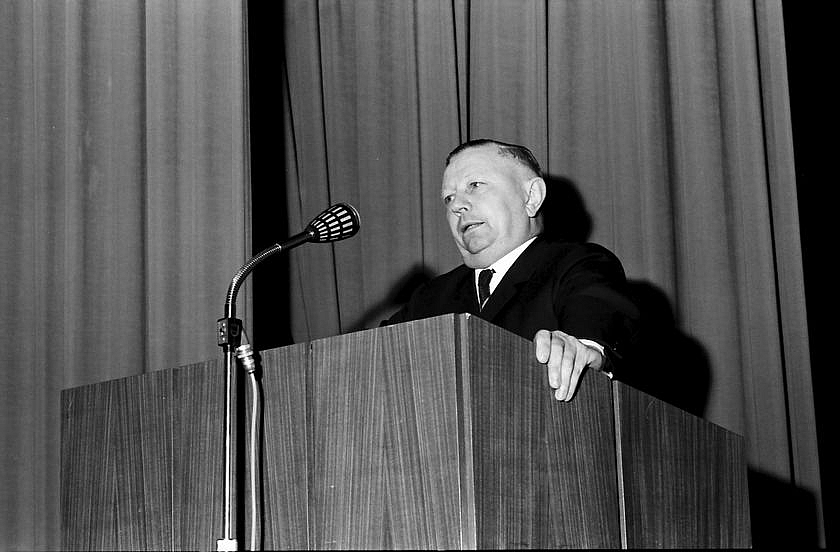
- Berberich in 1966

Member of the Bundestag; from Baden-Württemberg
- In office 15 October 1957 – 22 September 1972
- Preceded by: Oskar Wacker
- Succeeded by: Multi-member district
- Constituency: Tauberbischofsheim (1957–1969); State list (1969–1972)

Member of the; Landtag of Baden-Württemberg; for Buchen
- In office 1952–1956

Member of the; Landtag of Württemberg-Baden; for Tauberbischofsheim
- In office 1950–1952

Personal details
- Born: 18 March 1912 Gottersdorf, Kingdom of Württemberg, German Empire
- Died: 12 December 1982 (aged 70) Gottersdorf, Baden-Württemberg, West Germany
- Party: Christian Democratic Union
- Occupation: Farmer

August Berberich (18 March 1912 – 12 December 1982) was a German politician of the Christian Democratic Union (CDU) and former member of the German Bundestag.

== Life ==
Berberich was a member of the CDU. He was a member of the county council in the Buchen district of North Baden. He was a member of the state parliament of Württemberg-Baden from 1950 to 1952, and from 1952 to 1956 he was also a member of the constituent state assembly or the first state parliament of Baden-Württemberg.

Berberich was a member of the German Bundestag from 1957 to 1972. He represented the constituency of Tauberbischofsheim in parliament.

In 1977 he was awarded with honorary citizenship by Walldürn for "his services to the welfare of the community".

== Literature ==
Herbst, Ludolf; Jahn, Bruno (2002). Vierhaus, Rudolf (ed.). Biographisches Handbuch der Mitglieder des Deutschen Bundestages. 1949–2002 [Biographical Handbook of the Members of the German Bundestag. 1949–2002] (in German). München: De Gruyter - De Gruyter Saur. p. 1715. ISBN 978-3-11-184511-1.
