= Gerhard Heimann =

German politician

Member of the Bundestag
- In office 29 March 1983 – 20 December 1990

Personal details
- Born: 12 February 1934 Peine / Niedersachsen
- Died: 10 August 2017 (aged 83)
- Party: SPD

Gerhard Heimann (12 February 1934 – 10 August 2017) was a German politician of the Social Democratic Party (SPD) and former member of the German Bundestag.

== Life ==
From 1967 to 1971, he was a member of the Berlin House of Representatives and devoted himself primarily to education. From 1971 to 1977 he was Senate Director in the Senate Department for Science and Art. In 1977 he was promoted to head of the Senate Chancellery and in 1979 to Senator for Federal Affairs under Dietrich Stobbe. After losing the SPD government majority in Berlin in 1981, Heimann left the Senate and was elected to the Bundestag in 1983, where he remained until 1990.

== Literature ==
Herbst, Ludolf; Jahn, Bruno (2002). Vierhaus, Rudolf (ed.). Biographisches Handbuch der Mitglieder des Deutschen Bundestages. 1949–2002 [Biographical Handbook of the Members of the German Bundestag. 1949–2002] (in German). München: De Gruyter - De Gruyter Saur. p. 1715. ISBN 978-3-11-184511-1.
