= Waldemar Schreckenberger =

German politician, academic, and lawyer

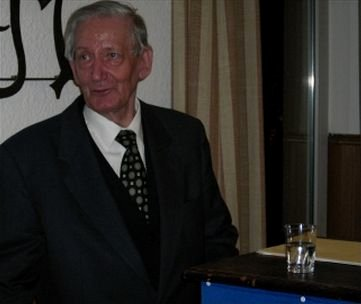
Waldemar Schreckenberger

Waldemar Schreckenberger (12 November 1929 – 4 August 2017) was a German lawyer, professor emeritus, and politician born in Ludwigshafen. After his graduation from Heidelberg Law School, he earned a doctorate, and completed his habilitation at the German University of Administrative Sciences Speyer. Subsequently, he assumed full professorships of public law and legal philosophy at the University of Mainz and at Speyer. From 1981 to 1982, he served as Minister of Justice of Rhineland Palatinate and thereafter as Chancellery Chief of Staff under Chancellor Helmut Kohl.

He died on 4 August 2017 at the age of 87.
