= Werner Knieper =

German politician

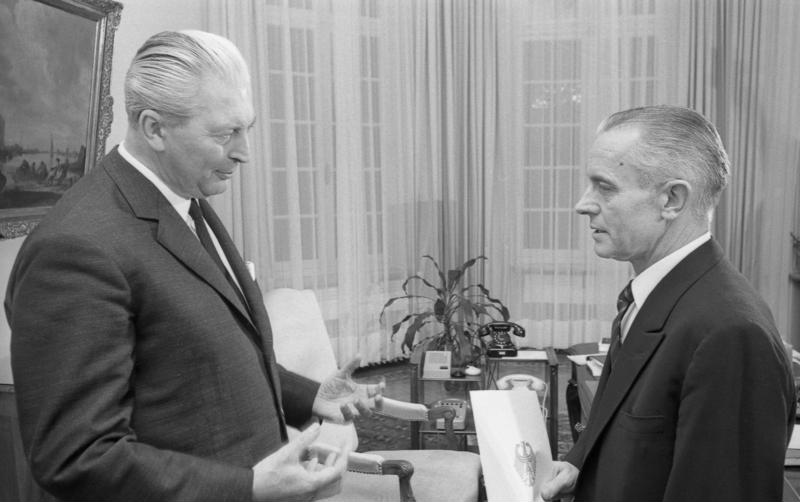
Knieper (pictured right) is appointed State Secretary by Kurt Georg Kiesinger in 1966

Werner Knieper (December 24, 1909 – July 17, 1977) was a German political official and manager.

== Life and profession ==
Knieper studied law in Heidelberg and Berlin. In Heidelberg he was a member of the Corps Suevia Heidelberg from 1930. After completing his studies, he entered the civil service. He became a member of the SA. During World War II he served in the artillery as a reserve captain, most recently in the Wehrmacht command staff.

Until 1966 he was head of the department for armament affairs in the Federal Ministry of Defence. From December 13, 1966, to December 31, 1967, Knieper was Head of the Federal Chancellery as State Secretary.

After retiring as Secretary of State, he went into industry as a manager. On May 15, 1968, Knieper became chairman of the board of the Vereinigte Flugtechnische Werke (VFW) in Bremen. After the merger of VFW with Fokker, he became chairman of the board of directors of the central company VFW-Fokker and in April 1970 also chairman of the supervisory board of Vereinigte Flugtechnische Werke Fokker GmbH in Bremen (until 1974).

From 1973 to 1974 Knieper was President of the Federal Association of the German Aerospace Industry (BDLI).
