= Rainer Hertrich =

German businessman

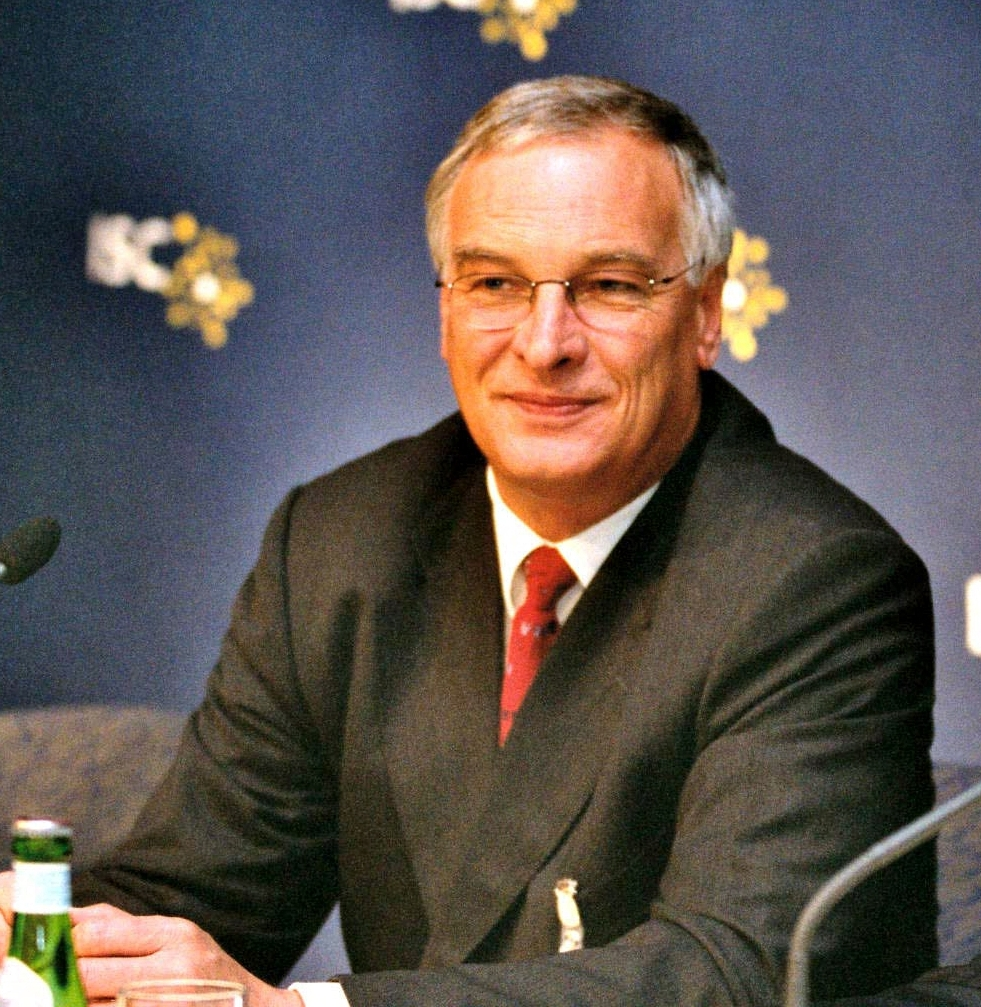
Image of Rainer Hertrich

Rainer Hertrich (born 6 December 1949) is a German industrialist. In 2000, he was appointed co-CEO of EADS. His counterpart is Philippe Camus, who is CEO in France. The dual role was considered "largely ceremonial". Hertrich was also CEO of the group's aeronautics division.

== Life and education ==
He was born on 6 December 1949 and studied business administration at Technische Universität Berlin and the University of Nuremberg after an apprenticeship at Siemens.

== Career ==
He began his career in 1977 as controlling supervisor at Messerschmitt-Bölkow-Blohm (MBB). In 1979, he became head of the controlling department at the MBB service division and in 1983 chief financial officer (CFO) in the same division.

In 1984, he served as head of the controlling and finance department at the MBB dynamics division, before becoming CFO and division management member at MBB's marine and special products services in 1987.

After MBB merged into Deutsche Aerospace AG (Dasa), in 1991, Hertrich became senior vice president for corporate controlling.

1996 Hertrich became head of the aero engines business unit of Dasa He was president and CEO of Dasa's Motoren- und Turbinen-Union (MTU) in Munich and a member of its board of management. In 2000, he was appointed president and CEO of Dasa.

== Associations ==
During 2001–2005, he served as president of the German Aerospace Industries Association (BDLI).

Hertrich was awarded Officer de la Légion d'honneur.
