= List of members of the 12th Bundestag =

12th Bundestag
←	11th	13th	→
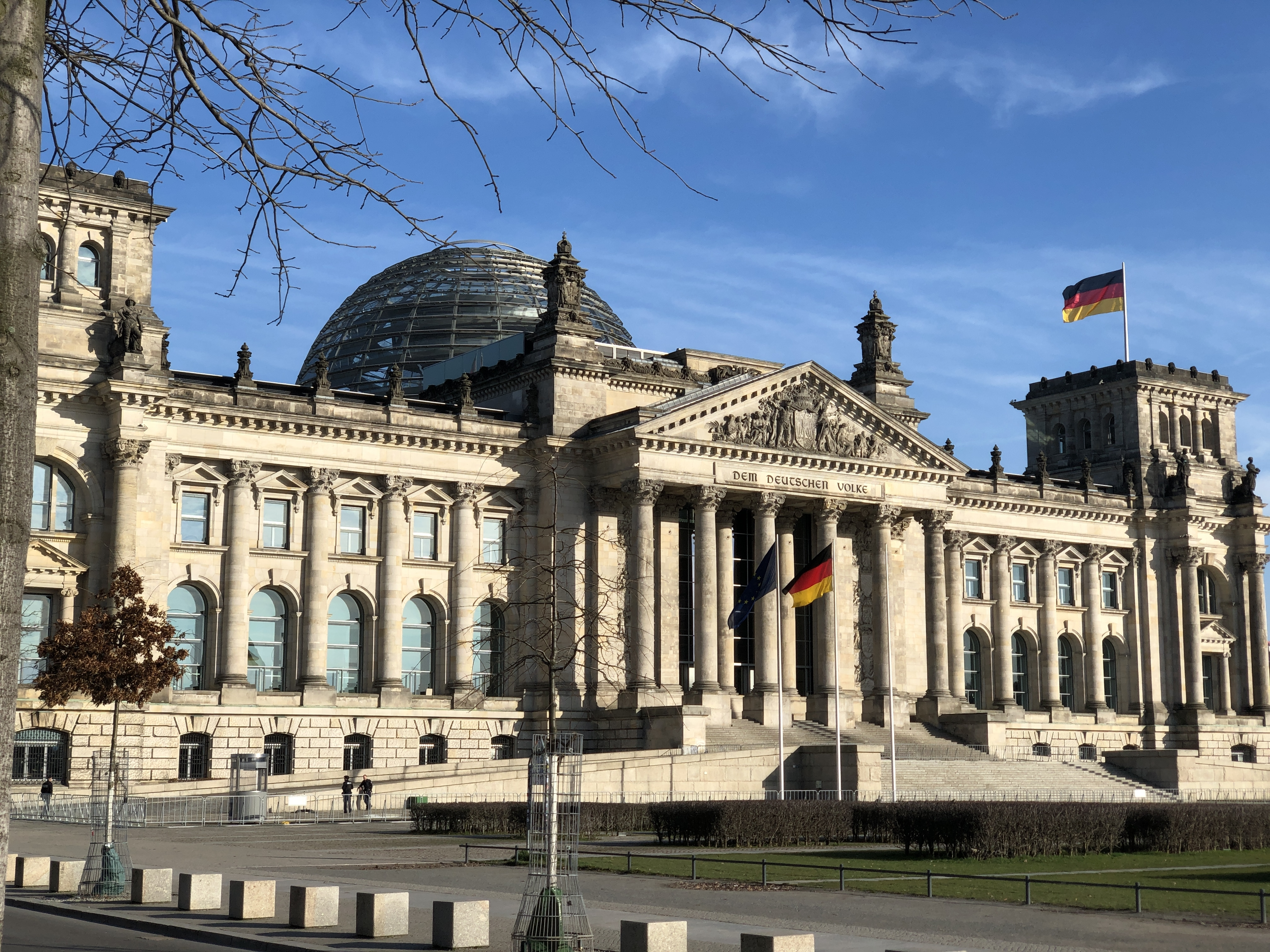
- Reichstag building in 2020

Overview
- Legislative body: Bundestag
- Jurisdiction: Germany
- Meeting place: Reichstag building, Berlin

Bundestag
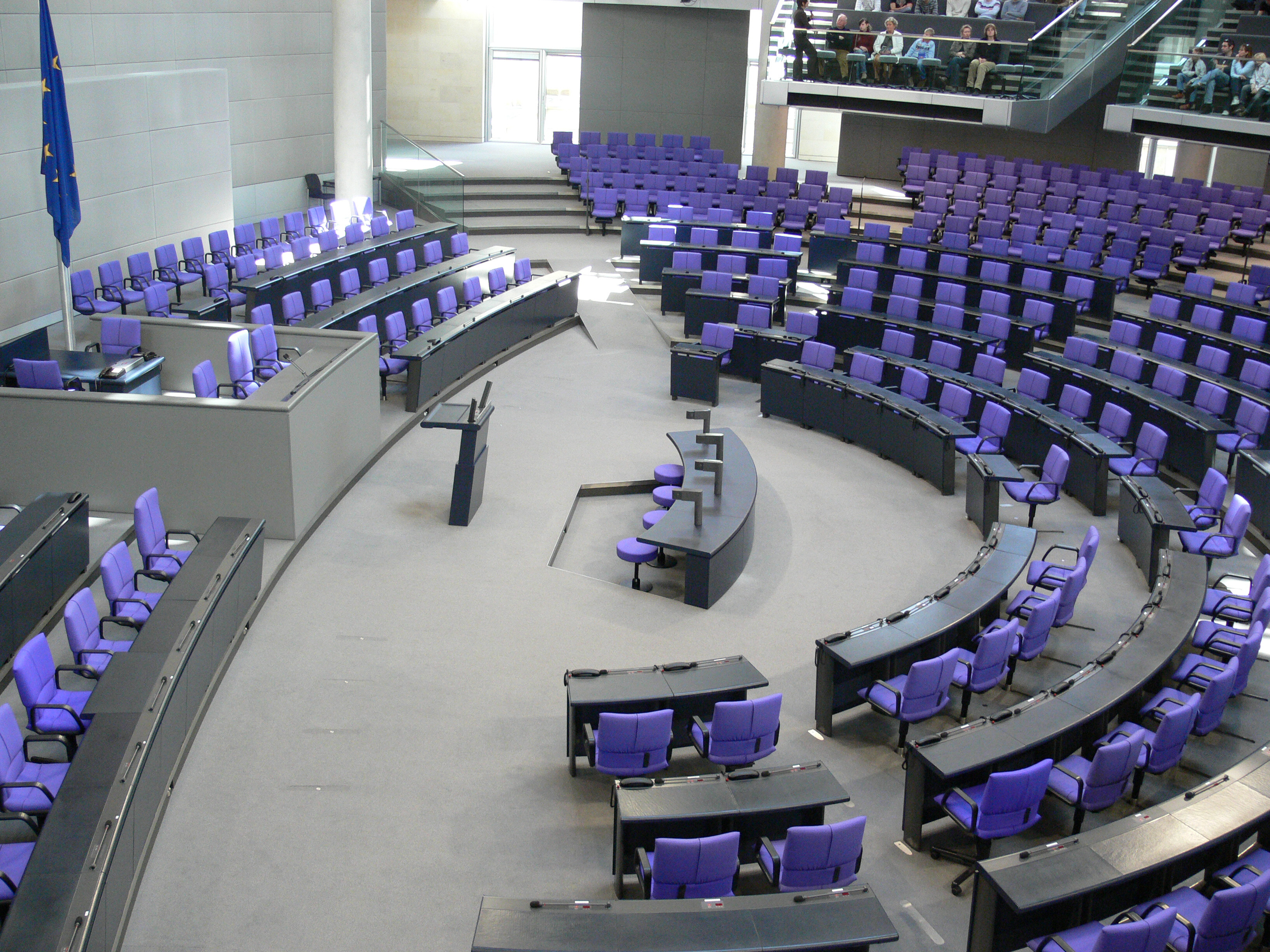
- Members: 662

This is a list of members of the 12th Bundestag – the lower house of parliament of the Federal Republic of Germany, whose members were elected in the 1990 federal election and served in office from 1990 until 1994.

This session also appointed observers to the European Parliament from East Germany.

== Summary ==
This summary includes changes in the numbers of the five caucuses (CDU/CSU, SPD, Greens, FDP, Party of Democratic Socialism):

Time	Reason of change	CDU/CSU	SPD	FDP	PDS	Greens	Others	Total number
1990	First meeting	319	239	79	17	8		662
22 April 1991	Ortwin Lowack leaves the CDU/CSU caucus and becomes unaffiliated	318	239	79	17	8	1	662
21 October 1991	Bernd Henn leaves the PDS caucus and becomes unaffiliated	318	239	79	16	8	2	662
19 December 1991	Ulrich Briefs leaves the PDS caucus and becomes unaffiliated	318	239	79	15	8	3	662
1 January 1993	Bernd Henn becomes a member again of the PDS caucus	318	239	79	16	8	2	662
25 May 1993	Rudolf Karl Krause leaves the CDU/CSU caucus and becomes unaffiliated	317	239	79	16	8	3	662
20 March 1994	Heinz-Dieter Hackel leaves the FDP caucus and becomes unaffiliated	317	239	78	16	8	4	662
10 May 1994	Christian Schenk leaves the Greens caucus and becomes unaffiliated	317	239	78	16	7	5	662
15 June 1994	Angela Stachowa leaves the PDS caucus and becomes unaffiliated	317	239	78	15	7	6	662

== Members ==
State	No.	Constituency	Member	Party
Schleswig-Holstein	1	Flensburg – Schleswig	Wolfgang Börnsen	CDU
Schleswig-Holstein	2	Nordfriesland – Dithmarschen-Nord	Peter Harry Carstensen	CDU
Schleswig-Holstein	3	Steinburg – Dithmarschen-Süd	Dietrich Austermann	CDU
Schleswig-Holstein	4	Rendsburg-Eckernförde	Gerhard Stoltenberg	CDU
Schleswig-Holstein	5	Kiel	Norbert Gansel	SPD
Schleswig-Holstein	6	Plön – Neumünster	Helmut Lamp	CDU
Schleswig-Holstein	7	Pinneberg	Ingrid Roitzsch	CDU
Schleswig-Holstein	8	Segeberg – Stormarn-Nord	Peter Kurt Würzbach	CDU
Schleswig-Holstein	9	Ostholstein	Rolf Olderog	CDU
Schleswig-Holstein	10	Herzogtum Lauenburg – Stormarn-Süd	Michael von Schmude	CDU
Schleswig-Holstein	11	Lübeck	Reinhold Hiller	SPD
Schleswig-Holstein	List		Lieselott Blunck	SPD
Schleswig-Holstein	List		Günther Heyenn	SPD
Schleswig-Holstein	List		Horst Jungmann	SPD
Schleswig-Holstein	List		Eckart Kuhlwein	SPD
Schleswig-Holstein	List		Ulrike Mehl	SPD
Schleswig-Holstein	List		Manfred Opel	SPD
Schleswig-Holstein	List		Cornelie Sonntag-Wolgast	SPD
Schleswig-Holstein	List		Antje-Marie Steen	SPD
Schleswig-Holstein	List		Jürgen Koppelin	FDP
Schleswig-Holstein	List		Wolfgang Kubicki (Note: Wolfgang Kubicki resigned on 2 August 1992.)	FDP
Schleswig-Holstein	List		Werner Zywietz	FDP
Schleswig-Holstein	List		Michaela Blunk (Note: Michaela Blunk took office on 7 August 1992, to succeed Wolfgang Kubicki.)	FDP
Schleswig-Holstein	List		Anke Eymer	CDU
Schleswig-Holstein	List		Ottfried Hennig (Note: Ottfried Hennig resigned on 31 May 1992.)	CDU
Schleswig-Holstein	List		Werner Ringkamp (Note: Werner Ringkamp took office on 1 June 1992, to succeed Ottfried Hennig.)	CDU
Hamburg	12	Hamburg-Mitte	Freimut Duve	SPD
Hamburg	13	Hamburg-Altona	Marliese Dobberthien	SPD
Hamburg	14	Hamburg-Eimsbüttel	Peter Paterna	SPD
Hamburg	15	Hamburg-Nord	Dirk Fischer	CDU
Hamburg	16	Hamburg-Wandsbek	Peter Zumkley (Note: Peter Zumkley resigned on 3 July 1991.)	SPD
Hamburg	17	Hamburg-Bergedorf	Rolf Niese	SPD
Hamburg	18	Hamburg-Harburg	Hans-Ulrich Klose	SPD
Hamburg	List		Jürgen Echternach	CDU
Hamburg	List		Klaus Francke	CDU
Hamburg	List		Susanne Rahardt-Vahldieck	CDU
Hamburg	List		Volker Rühe	CDU
Hamburg	List		Gunnar Uldall	CDU
Hamburg	List		Rainer Funke	FDP
Hamburg	List		Cornelia von Teichman und Logischen	FDP
Hamburg	List		Thea Bock (Note: Thea Bock took office on 4 July 1991, to succeed Peter Zumkley.)	SPD
Lower Saxony	19	Aurich – Emden	Carl Ewen	SPD
Lower Saxony	20	Unterems	Rudolf Seiters	CDU
Lower Saxony	21	Friesland – Wilhelmshaven	Gabriele Iwersen	SPD
Lower Saxony	22	Oldenburg – Ammerland	Dietmar Schütz	SPD
Lower Saxony	23	Delmenhorst – Wesermarsch – Oldenburg-Land	Margitta Terborg	SPD
Lower Saxony	24	Cuxhaven	Wolfgang von Geldern	CDU
Lower Saxony	25	Stade – Rotenburg I	Horst Eylmann	CDU
Lower Saxony	26	Mittelems	Hans-Gerd Strube	CDU
Lower Saxony	27	Cloppenburg – Vechta	Manfred Carstens	CDU
Lower Saxony	28	Diepholz	Walter Link	CDU
Lower Saxony	29	Verden – Osterholz	Arne Börnsen	SPD
Lower Saxony	30	Soltau-Fallingbostel – Rotenburg II	Heinz-Günter Bargfrede	CDU
Lower Saxony	31	Lüneburg – Lüchow-Dannenberg	Klaus Harries	CDU
Lower Saxony	32	Osnabrück-Land	Reinhard von Schorlemer	CDU
Lower Saxony	33	Stadt Osnabrück	Karl-Heinz Hornhues	CDU
Lower Saxony	34	Nienburg – Schaumburg	Helmut Rode	CDU
Lower Saxony	35	Harburg	Herbert Helmrich (Note: Herbert Helmrich resigned on 21 May 1992.)	CDU
Lower Saxony	36	Stadt Hannover I	Gerd Andres	SPD
Lower Saxony	37	Stadt Hannover II	Edelgard Bulmahn	SPD
Lower Saxony	38	Hannover-Land I	Dietmar Kansy	CDU
Lower Saxony	39	Celle – Uelzen	Klaus-Jürgen Hedrich	CDU
Lower Saxony	40	Gifhorn – Peine	Engelbert Nelle	CDU
Lower Saxony	41	Hameln – Holzminden	Brigitte Schulte	SPD
Lower Saxony	42	Hannover-Land II	Herbert Lattmann	CDU
Lower Saxony	43	Hildesheim	Hermann Rappe	SPD
Lower Saxony	44	Salzgitter – Wolfenbüttel	Wilhelm Schmidt	SPD
Lower Saxony	45	Braunschweig	Joachim Clemens	CDU
Lower Saxony	46	Helmstedt – Wolfsburg	Volkmar Köhler	CDU
Lower Saxony	47	Goslar	Rudolf Sprung	CDU
Lower Saxony	48	Northeim – Osterode	Edith Niehuis	SPD
Lower Saxony	49	Göttingen	Rita Süssmuth	CDU
Lower Saxony	List		Peter Eckardt	SPD
Lower Saxony	List		Arne Fuhrmann	SPD
Lower Saxony	List		Monika Ganseforth	SPD
Lower Saxony	List		Fritz Gautier	SPD
Lower Saxony	List		Günter Graf	SPD
Lower Saxony	List		Ingomar Hauchler	SPD
Lower Saxony	List		Ernst Kastning	SPD
Lower Saxony	List		Detlev von Larcher	SPD
Lower Saxony	List		Volker Neumann	SPD
Lower Saxony	List		Jan Oostergetelo	SPD
Lower Saxony	List		Ernst Schwanhold	SPD
Lower Saxony	List		Bodo Seidenthal	SPD
Lower Saxony	List		Peter Struck	SPD
Lower Saxony	List		Günther Tietjen (Note: Günther Tietjen died on 7 July 1993.)	SPD
Lower Saxony	List		Inge Wettig-Danielmeier	SPD
Lower Saxony	List		Margrit Wetzel	SPD
Lower Saxony	List		Kurt Palis (Note: Kurt Palis took office on 12 July 1993, to succeed Günther Tietjen.)	SPD
Lower Saxony	List		Wilfried Bohlsen	CDU
Lower Saxony	List		Gertrud Dempwolf	CDU
Lower Saxony	List		Carl-Detlev Freiherr von Hammerstein	CDU
Lower Saxony	List		Eva-Maria Kors	CDU
Lower Saxony	List		Thomas Kossendey	CDU
Lower Saxony	List		Erich Maaß	CDU
Lower Saxony	List		Hedda Meseke (Note: Hedda Meseke resigned on 6 December 1993.)	CDU
Lower Saxony	List		Friedbert Pflüger	CDU
Lower Saxony	List		Helmut Sauer	CDU
Lower Saxony	List		Wilfried Seibel	CDU
Lower Saxony	List		Hans-Peter Voigt	CDU
Lower Saxony	List		Jürgen Sikora (Note: Jürgen Sikora took office on 22 May 1992, to succeed Herbert Helmrich.)	CDU
Lower Saxony	List		Maria Anna Hiebing (Note: Maria Anna Hiebing took office on 8 December 1993, to succeed Hedda Meseke.)	CDU
Lower Saxony	List		Günther Bredehorn	FDP
Lower Saxony	List		Dirk Hansen	FDP
Lower Saxony	List		Detlef Kleinert	FDP
Lower Saxony	List		Lisa Peters	FDP
Lower Saxony	List		Carl-Ludwig Thiele	FDP
Lower Saxony	List		Jürgen Timm	FDP
Lower Saxony	List		Torsten Wolfgramm	FDP
Bremen	50	Bremen-Ost	Ernst Waltemathe	SPD
Bremen	51	Bremen-West	Hans Koschnick	SPD
Bremen	52	Bremerhaven – Bremen-Nord	Ilse Janz	SPD
Bremen	List		Günter Klein	CDU
Bremen	List		Bernd Neumann	CDU
Bremen	List		Manfred Richter	FDP
North Rhine-Westphalia	53	Aachen	Hans Stercken	CDU
North Rhine-Westphalia	54	Kreis Aachen	Achim Großmann	SPD
North Rhine-Westphalia	55	Heinsberg	Karl H. Fell	CDU
North Rhine-Westphalia	56	Düren	Wolfgang Vogt	CDU
North Rhine-Westphalia	57	Erftkreis I	Klaus Lennartz	SPD
North Rhine-Westphalia	58	Euskirchen – Erftkreis II	Wolf Bauer	CDU
North Rhine-Westphalia	59	Cologne I	Walter Rempe (Note: Walter Rempe died on 22 April 1993.)	SPD
North Rhine-Westphalia	60	Cologne II	Heribert Blens	CDU
North Rhine-Westphalia	61	Cologne III	Konrad Gilges	SPD
North Rhine-Westphalia	62	Cologne IV	Günter Oesinghaus	SPD
North Rhine-Westphalia	63	Bonn	Editha Limbach	CDU
North Rhine-Westphalia	64	Rhein-Sieg-Kreis I	Adolf Herkenrath	CDU
North Rhine-Westphalia	65	Rhein-Sieg-Kreis II	Franz Möller	CDU
North Rhine-Westphalia	66	Oberbergischer Kreis	Horst Waffenschmidt	CDU
North Rhine-Westphalia	67	Rheinisch-Bergischer Kreis I	Franz Heinrich Krey	CDU
North Rhine-Westphalia	68	Leverkusen – Rheinisch-Bergischer Kreis II	Johannes Singer	SPD
North Rhine-Westphalia	69	Wuppertal I	Rudolf Dreßler	SPD
North Rhine-Westphalia	70	Wuppertal II	Willfried Penner	SPD
North Rhine-Westphalia	71	Solingen – Remscheid	Bernd Wilz	CDU
North Rhine-Westphalia	72	Mettmann I	Joseph-Theodor Blank	CDU
North Rhine-Westphalia	73	Mettmann II	Heinz Schemken	CDU
North Rhine-Westphalia	74	Düsseldorf I	Wolfgang Schulhoff	CDU
North Rhine-Westphalia	75	Düsseldorf II	Volker Jung	SPD
North Rhine-Westphalia	76	Neuss I	Bertold Mathias Reinartz	CDU
North Rhine-Westphalia	77	Neuss II	Willy Wimmer	CDU
North Rhine-Westphalia	78	Mönchengladbach	Hans-Wilhelm Pesch	CDU
North Rhine-Westphalia	79	Krefeld	Dieter Pützhofen	CDU
North Rhine-Westphalia	80	Viersen	Julius Louven	CDU
North Rhine-Westphalia	81	Kleve	Heinrich Seesing	CDU
North Rhine-Westphalia	82	Wesel I	Uwe Jens	SPD
North Rhine-Westphalia	83	Wesel II	Jürgen Schmude	SPD
North Rhine-Westphalia	84	Duisburg I	Helmut Wieczorek	SPD
North Rhine-Westphalia	85	Duisburg II	Günter Schluckebier	SPD
North Rhine-Westphalia	86	Oberhausen	Dieter Schanz	SPD
North Rhine-Westphalia	87	Mülheim	Dieter Schloten	SPD
North Rhine-Westphalia	88	Essen I	Otto Reschke	SPD
North Rhine-Westphalia	89	Essen II	Peter Reuschenbach	SPD
North Rhine-Westphalia	90	Essen III	Ingrid Becker-Inglau	SPD
North Rhine-Westphalia	91	Recklinghausen I	Jochen Welt	SPD
North Rhine-Westphalia	92	Recklinghausen II – Borken I	Horst Niggemeier	SPD
North Rhine-Westphalia	93	Gelsenkirchen I	Joachim Poß	SPD
North Rhine-Westphalia	94	Gelsenkirchen II – Recklinghausen III	Norbert Formanski	SPD
North Rhine-Westphalia	95	Bottrop – Recklinghausen IV	Franz-Josef Mertens	SPD
North Rhine-Westphalia	96	Borken II	Elke Wülfing	CDU
North Rhine-Westphalia	97	Coesfeld – Steinfurt I	Wilhelm Rawe	CDU
North Rhine-Westphalia	98	Steinfurt II	Karl-Josef Laumann	CDU
North Rhine-Westphalia	99	Münster	Friedrich-Adolf Jahn	CDU
North Rhine-Westphalia	100	Warendorf	Peter Paziorek	CDU
North Rhine-Westphalia	101	Gütersloh	Hubert Doppmeier	CDU
North Rhine-Westphalia	102	Bielefeld	Günter Rixe	SPD
North Rhine-Westphalia	103	Herford	Rolf Koltzsch	SPD
North Rhine-Westphalia	104	Minden-Lübbecke	Lothar Ibrügger	SPD
North Rhine-Westphalia	105	Lippe I	Karl Hermann Haack	SPD
North Rhine-Westphalia	106	Höxter – Lippe II	Meinolf Michels	CDU
North Rhine-Westphalia	107	Paderborn	Friedhelm Ost	CDU
North Rhine-Westphalia	108	Hagen	Hans-Günther Toetemeyer	SPD
North Rhine-Westphalia	109	Ennepe-Ruhr-Kreis I	Adolf Ostertag	SPD
North Rhine-Westphalia	110	Bochum I	Klaus Hasenfratz	SPD
North Rhine-Westphalia	111	Bochum II – Ennepe-Ruhr-Kreis II	Klaus Lohmann	SPD
North Rhine-Westphalia	112	Herne	Dieter Maaß	SPD
North Rhine-Westphalia	113	Dortmund I	Hans-Eberhard Urbaniak	SPD
North Rhine-Westphalia	114	Dortmund II	Wolfgang Weiermann	SPD
North Rhine-Westphalia	115	Dortmund III	Ulla Burchardt	SPD
North Rhine-Westphalia	116	Unna I	Ulrich Böhme	SPD
North Rhine-Westphalia	117	Hamm – Unna II	Dieter Wiefelspütz	SPD
North Rhine-Westphalia	118	Soest	Jürgen Augustinowitz	CDU
North Rhine-Westphalia	119	Hochsauerlandkreis	Ferdinand Tillmann	CDU
North Rhine-Westphalia	120	Siegen-Wittgenstein I	Paul Breuer	CDU
North Rhine-Westphalia	121	Olpe – Siegen-Wittgenstein II	Joachim Grünewald	CDU
North Rhine-Westphalia	122	Märkischer Kreis I	Cornelia Yzer	CDU
North Rhine-Westphalia	123	Märkischer Kreis II	Lisa Seuster	SPD
North Rhine-Westphalia	List		Norbert Blüm	CDU
North Rhine-Westphalia	List		Jochen Borchert	CDU
North Rhine-Westphalia	List		Renate Diemers	CDU
North Rhine-Westphalia	List		Ilse Falk	CDU
North Rhine-Westphalia	List		Leni Fischer	CDU
North Rhine-Westphalia	List		Winfried Fockenberg	CDU
North Rhine-Westphalia	List		Erich G. Fritz	CDU
North Rhine-Westphalia	List		Reinhard Göhner	CDU
North Rhine-Westphalia	List		Horst Günther	CDU
North Rhine-Westphalia	List		Peter Hintze	CDU
North Rhine-Westphalia	List		Paul Hoffacker	CDU
North Rhine-Westphalia	List		Steffen Kampeter	CDU
North Rhine-Westphalia	List		Irmgard Karwatzki	CDU
North Rhine-Westphalia	List		Karl Lamers	CDU
North Rhine-Westphalia	List		Norbert Lammert	CDU
North Rhine-Westphalia	List		Wolfgang Lohmann	CDU
North Rhine-Westphalia	List		Claire Marienfeld	CDU
North Rhine-Westphalia	List		Erwin Marschewski	CDU
North Rhine-Westphalia	List		Wolfgang Meckelburg	CDU
North Rhine-Westphalia	List		Reinhard Meyer zu Bentrup	CDU
North Rhine-Westphalia	List		Alfons Müller	CDU
North Rhine-Westphalia	List		Winfried Pinger	CDU
North Rhine-Westphalia	List		Ronald Pofalla	CDU
North Rhine-Westphalia	List		Jürgen Rüttgers	CDU
North Rhine-Westphalia	List		Andreas Schmidt	CDU
North Rhine-Westphalia	List		Hans Peter Schmitz	CDU
North Rhine-Westphalia	List		Friedrich Vogel	CDU
North Rhine-Westphalia	List		Ruprecht Vondran	CDU
North Rhine-Westphalia	List		Dorothee Wilms	CDU
North Rhine-Westphalia	List		Bernhard Worms (Note: Bernhard Worms resigned on 31 January 1991.)	CDU
North Rhine-Westphalia	List		Hubert Hüppe (Note: Hubert Hüppe took office on 1 February 1991, to succeed Bernhard Worms.)	CDU
North Rhine-Westphalia	List		Klaus-Heiner Lehne (Note: Klaus-Heiner Lehne took office on 12 March 1992, to succeed Hubert Doppmeier.)	CDU
North Rhine-Westphalia	List		Helmuth Becker	SPD
North Rhine-Westphalia	List		Hans Berger	SPD
North Rhine-Westphalia	List		Hans Gottfried Bernrath	SPD
North Rhine-Westphalia	List		Friedhelm Julius Beucher	SPD
North Rhine-Westphalia	List		Willy Brandt (Note: Willy Brandt died on 8 October 1992.)	SPD
North Rhine-Westphalia	List		Anni Brandt-Elsweier	SPD
North Rhine-Westphalia	List		Wolf-Michael Catenhusen	SPD
North Rhine-Westphalia	List		Horst Ehmke	SPD
North Rhine-Westphalia	List		Helmut Esters	SPD
North Rhine-Westphalia	List		Anke Fuchs	SPD
North Rhine-Westphalia	List		Katrin Fuchs	SPD
North Rhine-Westphalia	List		Dieter Heistermann	SPD
North Rhine-Westphalia	List		Uwe Holtz	SPD
North Rhine-Westphalia	List		Horst Jaunich	SPD
North Rhine-Westphalia	List		Marianne Klappert	SPD
North Rhine-Westphalia	List		Volkmar Kretkowski	SPD
North Rhine-Westphalia	List		Ingrid Matthäus-Maier	SPD
North Rhine-Westphalia	List		Michael Müller	SPD
North Rhine-Westphalia	List		Franz Müntefering (Note: Franz Müntefering resigned on 8 December 1992.)	SPD
North Rhine-Westphalia	List		Rudolf Purps	SPD
North Rhine-Westphalia	List		Margot von Renesse	SPD
North Rhine-Westphalia	List		Ulla Schmidt	SPD
North Rhine-Westphalia	List		Regina Schmidt-Zadel	SPD
North Rhine-Westphalia	List		Heinz-Alfred Steiner	SPD
North Rhine-Westphalia	List		Josef Vosen	SPD
North Rhine-Westphalia	List		Hildegard Wester	SPD
North Rhine-Westphalia	List		Christoph Zöpel	SPD
North Rhine-Westphalia	List		Heike Niggemeyer (Note: Heike Niggemeyer took office on 22 October 1992, to succeed Willy Brandt, but later resigned on 29 October 1992.)	SPD
North Rhine-Westphalia	List		Karl-Heinz Klejdzinski (Note: Karl-Heinz Klejdzinski took office on 30 October 1992, to succeed Heike Niggemeyer.)	SPD
North Rhine-Westphalia	List		Walter Schöler (Note: Walter Schöler took office on 8 December 1992, to succeed Franz Müntefering.)	SPD
North Rhine-Westphalia	List		Hans-Peter Kemper (Note: Hans-Peter Kemper took office on 3 May 1993, to succeed Walter Rempe.)	SPD
North Rhine-Westphalia	List		Ina Albowitz	FDP
North Rhine-Westphalia	List		Gerhart Baum	FDP
North Rhine-Westphalia	List		Klaus Beckmann (Note: Klaus Beckmann died on 27 May 1994.)	FDP
North Rhine-Westphalia	List		Dieter-Julius Cronenberg	FDP
North Rhine-Westphalia	List		Jörg van Essen	FDP
North Rhine-Westphalia	List		Paul Friedhoff	FDP
North Rhine-Westphalia	List		Hans H. Gattermann (Note: Hans H. Gattermann died on 27 January 1994.)	FDP
North Rhine-Westphalia	List		Hans-Dietrich Genscher	FDP
North Rhine-Westphalia	List		Burkhard Hirsch	FDP
North Rhine-Westphalia	List		Werner Hoyer	FDP
North Rhine-Westphalia	List		Karl-Hans Laermann	FDP
North Rhine-Westphalia	List		Otto Graf Lambsdorff	FDP
North Rhine-Westphalia	List		Jürgen Möllemann	FDP
North Rhine-Westphalia	List		Günther Friedrich Nolting	FDP
North Rhine-Westphalia	List		Gerhard Schüßler	FDP
North Rhine-Westphalia	List		Irmgard Schwaetzer	FDP
North Rhine-Westphalia	List		Burkhard Zurheide	FDP
North Rhine-Westphalia	List		Detlef Parr (Note: Detlef Parr took office on 1 February 1994, to succeed Hans H. Gattermann.)	FDP
North Rhine-Westphalia	List		Jens Jordan (Note: Jens Jordan took office on 8 June 1994, to succeed Klaus Beckmann.)	FDP
North Rhine-Westphalia	List		Ulla Jelpke	PDS
Hesse	124	Waldeck	Rudi Walther	SPD
Hesse	125	Kassel	Horst Peter	SPD
Hesse	126	Werra-Meißner	Joachim Tappe	SPD
Hesse	127	Schwalm-Eder	Albert Pfuhl	SPD
Hesse	128	Hersfeld	Berthold Wittich	SPD
Hesse	129	Marburg	Friedrich Bohl	CDU
Hesse	130	Lahn-Dill	Klaus Daubertshäuser	SPD
Hesse	131	Gießen	Erwin Horn	SPD
Hesse	132	Fulda	Alfred Dregger	CDU
Hesse	133	Hochtaunus	Bärbel Sothmann	CDU
Hesse	134	Wetterau	Christian Schwarz-Schilling	CDU
Hesse	135	Rheingau-Taunus – Limburg	Michael Jung	CDU
Hesse	136	Wiesbaden	Hannelore Rönsch	CDU
Hesse	137	Hanau	Richard Bayha (Note: Richard Bayha died on 3 November 1993.)	CDU
Hesse	138	Frankfurt am Main I – Main-Taunus	Heinz Riesenhuber	CDU
Hesse	139	Frankfurt am Main II	Joachim Gres	CDU
Hesse	140	Frankfurt am Main III	Erika Steinbach-Hermann	CDU
Hesse	141	Groß-Gerau	Norbert Wieczorek	SPD
Hesse	142	Offenbach	Klaus Lippold	CDU
Hesse	143	Darmstadt	Eike Ebert	SPD
Hesse	144	Odenwald	Alexander Warrikoff	CDU
Hesse	145	Bergstraße	Franz-Hermann Kappes (Note: Franz-Hermann Kappes died on 24 August 1992.)	CDU
Hesse	List		Klaus Kübler	SPD
Hesse	List		Brigitte Lange	SPD
Hesse	List		Dorothea Marx	SPD
Hesse	List		Bernd Reuter	SPD
Hesse	List		Gudrun Schaich-Walch	SPD
Hesse	List		Werner Schuster	SPD
Hesse	List		Dietrich Sperling	SPD
Hesse	List		Karsten Voigt	SPD
Hesse	List		Barbara Weiler (Note: Barbara Weiler resigned on 14 August 1994.)	SPD
Hesse	List		Heidemarie Wieczorek-Zeul	SPD
Hesse	List		Uta Zapf	SPD
Hesse	List		Diether Dehm (Note: Diether Dehm took office on 16 August 1994, to succeed Barbara Weiler.)	SPD
Hesse	List		Anneliese Augustin	CDU
Hesse	List		Wilfried Böhm	CDU
Hesse	List		Heinz-Adolf Hörsken	CDU
Hesse	List		Bernhard Jagoda (Note: Bernhard Jagoda resigned on 7 February 1993.)	CDU
Hesse	List		Ursula Lehr	CDU
Hesse	List		Christian Lenzer	CDU
Hesse	List		Gerhard O. Pfeffermann (Note: Gerhard O. Pfeffermann resigned on 6 September 1993.)	CDU
Hesse	List		Adolf Roth	CDU
Hesse	List		Karl Stockhausen	CDU
Hesse	List		Sissy Geiger (Note: Sissy Geiger took office on 29 September 1992, to succeed Franz-Hermann Kappes.)	CDU
Hesse	List		Erhard Niedenthal (Note: Erhard Niedenthal took office on 8 February 1993, to succeed Bernhard Jagoda.)	CDU
Hesse	List		Wolfgang Erler (Note: Wolfgang Erler took office on 6 September 1993, to succeed Gerhard O. Pfeffermann.)	CDU
Hesse	List		Norbert Herr (Note: Norbert Herr took office on 11 November 1993, to succeed Richard Bayha.)	CDU
Hesse	List		Gisela Babel	FDP
Hesse	List		Margret Funke-Schmitt-Rink	FDP
Hesse	List		Ekkehard Gries	FDP
Hesse	List		Heinrich Kolb	FDP
Hesse	List		Hans-Joachim Otto	FDP
Hesse	List		Hermann Otto Solms	FDP
Rhineland-Palatinate	146	Neuwied	Ulrich Schmalz	CDU
Rhineland-Palatinate	147	Ahrweiler	Karl Deres	CDU
Rhineland-Palatinate	148	Koblenz	Roswitha Verhülsdonk	CDU
Rhineland-Palatinate	149	Cochem	Peter Bleser	CDU
Rhineland-Palatinate	150	Kreuznach	Fritz Rudolf Körper	SPD
Rhineland-Palatinate	151	Bitburg	Peter Rauen	CDU
Rhineland-Palatinate	152	Trier	Günther Schartz	CDU
Rhineland-Palatinate	153	Montabaur	Joachim Hörster	CDU
Rhineland-Palatinate	154	Mainz	Johannes Gerster	CDU
Rhineland-Palatinate	155	Worms	Florian Gerster (Note: Florian Gerster resigned on 7 June 1991.)	SPD
Rhineland-Palatinate	156	Frankenthal	Horst Sielaff	SPD
Rhineland-Palatinate	157	Ludwigshafen	Helmut Kohl	CDU
Rhineland-Palatinate	158	Neustadt – Speyer	Theo Magin	CDU
Rhineland-Palatinate	159	Kaiserslautern	Rose Götte (Note: Rose Götte resigned on 7 June 1991.)	SPD
Rhineland-Palatinate	160	Pirmasens	Klaus-Dieter Uelhoff	CDU
Rhineland-Palatinate	161	Südpfalz	Heiner Geißler	CDU
Rhineland-Palatinate	List		Karl Diller	SPD
Rhineland-Palatinate	List		Ludwig Eich	SPD
Rhineland-Palatinate	List		Elke Leonhard	SPD
Rhineland-Palatinate	List		Albrecht Müller	SPD
Rhineland-Palatinate	List		Eckhart Pick	SPD
Rhineland-Palatinate	List		Manfred Reimann	SPD
Rhineland-Palatinate	List		Hans Wallow	SPD
Rhineland-Palatinate	List		Lydia Westrich	SPD
Rhineland-Palatinate	List		Gudrun Weyel	SPD
Rhineland-Palatinate	List		Ralf Walter (Note: Ralf Walter took office on 10 June 1991, to succeed Florian Gerster, but later resigned on 21 August 1994.)	SPD
Rhineland-Palatinate	List		Peter Büchner (Note: Peter Büchner took office on 10 June 1991, to succeed Rose Götte.)	SPD
Rhineland-Palatinate	List		Walter Bersch (Note: Walter Bersch took office on 22 August 1994, to succeed Ralf Walter.)	SPD
Rhineland-Palatinate	List		Walter Franz Altherr	CDU
Rhineland-Palatinate	List		Maria Böhmer	CDU
Rhineland-Palatinate	List		Hansjürgen Doss	CDU
Rhineland-Palatinate	List		Heribert Scharrenbroich (Note: Heribert Scharrenbroich resigned on 23 March 1994.)	CDU
Rhineland-Palatinate	List		Stefan Schwarz	CDU
Rhineland-Palatinate	List		Dorothea Szwed (Note: Dorothea Szwed took office on 24 March 1994, to succeed Heribert Scharrenbroich.)	CDU
Rhineland-Palatinate	List		Walter Hitschler	FDP
Rhineland-Palatinate	List		Helmut Schäfer	FDP
Rhineland-Palatinate	List		Marita Sehn	FDP
Rhineland-Palatinate	List		Dieter Thomae	FDP
Baden-Württemberg	162	Stuttgart-Süd	Roland Sauer	CDU
Baden-Württemberg	163	Stuttgart-Nord	Erika Reinhardt	CDU
Baden-Württemberg	164	Böblingen	Brigitte Baumeister	CDU
Baden-Württemberg	165	Esslingen	Otto Hauser	CDU
Baden-Württemberg	166	Nürtingen	Elmar Müller	CDU
Baden-Württemberg	167	Göppingen	Claus Jäger	CDU
Baden-Württemberg	168	Waiblingen	Paul Laufs	CDU
Baden-Württemberg	169	Ludwigsburg	Matthias Wissmann	CDU
Baden-Württemberg	170	Neckar-Zaber	Renate Hellwig	CDU
Baden-Württemberg	171	Heilbronn	Egon Susset	CDU
Baden-Württemberg	172	Schwäbisch Hall	Wolfgang von Stetten	CDU
Baden-Württemberg	173	Backnang – Schwäbisch Gmünd	Dieter Schulte	CDU
Baden-Württemberg	174	Aalen – Heidenheim	Georg Brunnhuber	CDU
Baden-Württemberg	175	Karlsruhe-Stadt	Norbert Rieder	CDU
Baden-Württemberg	176	Karlsruhe-Land	Klaus Bühler	CDU
Baden-Württemberg	177	Rastatt	Peter Götz	CDU
Baden-Württemberg	178	Heidelberg	Udo Ehrbar	CDU
Baden-Württemberg	179	Mannheim I	Siegfried Vergin	SPD
Baden-Württemberg	180	Mannheim II	Roswitha Wisniewski	CDU
Baden-Württemberg	181	Odenwald – Tauber	Siegfried Hornung	CDU
Baden-Württemberg	182	Rhein-Neckar	Bernd Schmidbauer	CDU
Baden-Württemberg	183	Pforzheim	Lutz Stavenhagen (Note: Lutz Stavenhagen died on 31 May 1992.)	CDU
Baden-Württemberg	184	Calw	Hans-Joachim Fuchtel	CDU
Baden-Württemberg	185	Freiburg	Conrad Schroeder (Note: Conrad Schroeder resigned on 20 October 1991.)	CDU
Baden-Württemberg	186	Lörrach – Müllheim	Ortrun Schätzle	CDU
Baden-Württemberg	187	Emmendingen – Lahr	Rainer Haungs	CDU
Baden-Württemberg	188	Offenburg	Wolfgang Schäuble	CDU
Baden-Württemberg	189	Rottweil – Tuttlingen	Volker Kauder	CDU
Baden-Württemberg	190	Schwarzwald-Baar	Meinrad Belle	CDU
Baden-Württemberg	191	Konstanz	Hans-Peter Repnik	CDU
Baden-Württemberg	192	Waldshut	Werner Dörflinger	CDU
Baden-Württemberg	193	Reutlingen	Anton Pfeifer	CDU
Baden-Württemberg	194	Tübingen	Claus-Peter Grotz	CDU
Baden-Württemberg	195	Ulm	Herbert Werner	CDU
Baden-Württemberg	196	Biberach	Alois Graf von Waldburg-Zeil	CDU
Baden-Württemberg	197	Ravensburg – Bodensee	Andreas Schockenhoff	CDU
Baden-Württemberg	198	Zollernalb – Sigmaringen	Hermann Schwörer	CDU
Baden-Württemberg	List		Brigitte Adler	SPD
Baden-Württemberg	List		Robert Antretter	SPD
Baden-Württemberg	List		Hermann Bachmaier	SPD
Baden-Württemberg	List		Rudolf Bindig	SPD
Baden-Württemberg	List		Andreas von Bülow	SPD
Baden-Württemberg	List		Hans Martin Bury	SPD
Baden-Württemberg	List		Marion Caspers-Merk	SPD
Baden-Württemberg	List		Peter Conradi	SPD
Baden-Württemberg	List		Herta Däubler-Gmelin	SPD
Baden-Württemberg	List		Gernot Erler	SPD
Baden-Württemberg	List		Gerlinde Hämmerle (Note: Gerlinde Hämmerle resigned on 31 July 1994.)	SPD
Baden-Württemberg	List		Liesel Hartenstein	SPD
Baden-Württemberg	List		Gunter Huonker	SPD
Baden-Württemberg	List		Klaus Kirschner	SPD
Baden-Württemberg	List		Jürgen Meyer	SPD
Baden-Württemberg	List		Siegmar Mosdorf	SPD
Baden-Württemberg	List		Doris Odendahl	SPD
Baden-Württemberg	List		Wolfgang Roth (Note: Wolfgang Roth resigned on 2 September 1993.)	SPD
Baden-Württemberg	List		Harald B. Schäfer (Note: Harald B. Schäfer resigned on 27 June 1992.)	SPD
Baden-Württemberg	List		Hermann Scheer	SPD
Baden-Württemberg	List		Hartmut Soell	SPD
Baden-Württemberg	List		Konstanze Wegner	SPD
Baden-Württemberg	List		Gert Weisskirchen	SPD
Baden-Württemberg	List		Matthias Weisheit (Note: Matthias Weisheit took office on 29 June 1992, to succeed Harald B. Schäfer.)	SPD
Baden-Württemberg	List		Christa Lörcher (Note: Christa Lörcher took office on 3 September 1993, to succeed Wolfgang Roth.)	SPD
Baden-Württemberg	List		Peter Alltschekow (Note: Peter Alltschekow took office on 3 August 1994, to succeed Gerlinde Hämmerle.)	SPD
Baden-Württemberg	List		Olaf Feldmann	FDP
Baden-Württemberg	List		Georg Gallus	FDP
Baden-Württemberg	List		Martin Grüner	FDP
Baden-Württemberg	List		Helmut Haussmann	FDP
Baden-Württemberg	List		Ulrich Heinrich	FDP
Baden-Württemberg	List		Birgit Homburger	FDP
Baden-Württemberg	List		Roland Kohn	FDP
Baden-Württemberg	List		Ursula Seiler-Albring	FDP
Baden-Württemberg	List		Ingrid Walz	FDP
Baden-Württemberg	List		Wolfgang Weng	FDP
Baden-Württemberg	List		Karin Jeltsch	CDU
Baden-Württemberg	List		Egon Jüttner	CDU
Baden-Württemberg	List		Franz Romer	CDU
Baden-Württemberg	List		Sigrun Löwisch (Note: Sigrun Löwisch took office on 12 October 1991, to succeed Conrad Schroeder.)	CDU
Baden-Württemberg	List		Klaus Riegert (Note: Klaus Riegert took office on 10 June 1992, to succeed Lutz Stavenhagen.)	CDU
Bavaria	199	Altötting	Karl-Heinz Spilker	CSU
Bavaria	200	Freising	Albert Probst	CSU
Bavaria	201	Fürstenfeldbruck	Gerda Hasselfeldt	CSU
Bavaria	202	Ingolstadt	Horst Seehofer	CSU
Bavaria	203	Munich Centre	Ulrike Mascher	SPD
Bavaria	204	Munich North	Fritz Wittmann	CSU
Bavaria	205	Munich East	Herbert Frankenhauser	CSU
Bavaria	206	Munich South	Erich Riedl	CSU
Bavaria	207	Munich West	Kurt Faltlhauser	CSU
Bavaria	208	Munich Land	Martin Mayer	CSU
Bavaria	209	Rosenheim	Wolfgang Zeitlmann	CSU
Bavaria	210	Starnberg	Wolfgang Gröbl	CSU
Bavaria	211	Traunstein	Peter Ramsauer	CSU
Bavaria	212	Weilheim	Michaela Geiger	CSU
Bavaria	213	Deggendorf	Bartholomäus Kalb	CSU
Bavaria	214	Landshut	Wolfgang Götzer	CSU
Bavaria	215	Passau	Klaus Rose	CSU
Bavaria	216	Rottal-Inn	Günther Müller	CSU
Bavaria	217	Straubing	Ernst Hinsken	CSU
Bavaria	218	Amberg	Rudolf Kraus	CSU
Bavaria	219	Regensburg	Benno Zierer	CSU
Bavaria	220	Schwandorf	Dionys Jobst	CSU
Bavaria	221	Weiden	Simon Wittmann	CSU
Bavaria	222	Bamberg	Gerhard Scheu	CSU
Bavaria	223	Bayreuth	Ortwin Lowack	CSU
Bavaria	224	Coburg	Otto Regenspurger	CSU
Bavaria	225	Hof	Jürgen Warnke	CSU
Bavaria	226	Kulmbach	Bernd Protzner	CSU
Bavaria	227	Ansbach	Carl-Dieter Spranger	CSU
Bavaria	228	Erlangen	Gerhard Friedrich	CSU
Bavaria	229	Fürth	Christian Schmidt	CSU
Bavaria	230	Nuremberg North	Renate Schmidt	SPD
Bavaria	231	Nuremberg South	Renate Blank	CSU
Bavaria	232	Roth	Hansgeorg Hauser	CSU
Bavaria	233	Aschaffenburg	Norbert Geis	CSU
Bavaria	234	Bad Kissingen	Eduard Lintner	CSU
Bavaria	235	Main-Spessart	Wolfgang Zöller	CSU
Bavaria	236	Schweinfurt	Michael Glos	CSU
Bavaria	237	Würzburg	Wolfgang Bötsch	CSU
Bavaria	238	Augsburg-Stadt	Christian Ruck	CSU
Bavaria	239	Augsburg-Land	Eduard Oswald	CSU
Bavaria	240	Donau-Ries	Hans Raidel	CSU
Bavaria	241	Neu-Ulm	Theo Waigel	CSU
Bavaria	242	Oberallgäu	Ignaz Kiechle	CSU
Bavaria	243	Ostallgäu	Kurt Rossmanith	CSU
Bavaria	List		Hans Büchler	SPD
Bavaria	List		Hans Büttner	SPD
Bavaria	List		Peter Glotz	SPD
Bavaria	List		Susanne Kastner	SPD
Bavaria	List		Walter Kolbow	SPD
Bavaria	List		Horst Kubatschka	SPD
Bavaria	List		Uwe Lambinus	SPD
Bavaria	List		Robert Leidinger	SPD
Bavaria	List		Heide Mattischeck	SPD
Bavaria	List		Rudolf Müller	SPD
Bavaria	List		Martin Pfaff	SPD
Bavaria	List		Otto Schily	SPD
Bavaria	List		Horst Schmidbauer	SPD
Bavaria	List		Rudolf Schöfberger	SPD
Bavaria	List		Erika Simm	SPD
Bavaria	List		Sigrid Skarpelis-Sperk	SPD
Bavaria	List		Ludwig Stiegler	SPD
Bavaria	List		Uta Titze-Stecher	SPD
Bavaria	List		Günter Verheugen	SPD
Bavaria	List		Axel Wernitz	SPD
Bavaria	List		Hermann Wimmer	SPD
Bavaria	List		Hans de With	SPD
Bavaria	List		Verena Wohlleben	SPD
Bavaria	List		Hanna Wolf	SPD
Bavaria	List		Norbert Eimer	FDP
Bavaria	List		Hans A. Engelhard	FDP
Bavaria	List		Horst Friedrich	FDP
Bavaria	List		Josef Grünbeck	FDP
Bavaria	List		Ulrich Irmer	FDP
Bavaria	List		Sabine Leutheusser-Schnarrenberger	FDP
Bavaria	List		Hans Paintner	FDP
Bavaria	List		Hermann Rind	FDP
Bavaria	List		Cornelia Schmalz-Jacobsen	FDP
Bavaria	List		Albert Dess	CSU
Bavaria	List		Maria Eichhorn	CSU
Bavaria	List		Josef Hollerith	CSU
Bavaria	List		Peter Keller	CSU
Bavaria	List		Hans Klein	CSU
Bavaria	List		Hartmut Koschyk	CSU
Bavaria	List		Ursula Männle	CSU
Bavaria	List		Oscar Schneider	CSU
Saarland	244	Saarbrücken I	Vacant (Note: Member-elect Oskar Lafontaine (SPD) declined to take office.)	
Saarland	245	Saarbrücken II	Jutta Müller	SPD
Saarland	246	Saarlouis	Ottmar Schreiner	SPD
Saarland	247	St. Wendel	Hans-Georg Wagner	SPD
Saarland	248	Homburg	Lothar Fischer	SPD
Saarland	List		Johannes Ganz	CDU
Saarland	List		Hans-Werner Müller	CDU
Saarland	List		Trudi Schmidt	CDU
Saarland	List		Klaus Töpfer	CDU
Saarland	List		Elke Ferner	SPD
Saarland	List		Michael Habermann (Note: Michael Habermann took office after member-elect Oskar Lafontaine declined to take office.)	SPD
Saarland	List		Uta Würfel	FDP
Berlin	249	Berlin-Tiergarten – Wedding – Nord-Charlottenburg	Christian Neuling	CDU
Berlin	250	Berlin-Reinickendorf	Gabriele Wiechatzek	CDU
Berlin	251	Berlin-Spandau	Peter Kittelmann	CDU
Berlin	252	Berlin-Zehlendorf – Steglitz	Gero Pfennig	CDU
Berlin	253	Berlin-Charlottenburg – Wilmersdorf	Dietrich Mahlo	CDU
Berlin	254	Berlin-Kreuzberg – Schöneberg	Jochen Feilcke	CDU
Berlin	255	Berlin-Tempelhof – Südost-Steglitz	Rupert Scholz	CDU
Berlin	256	Berlin-Neukölln	Dankward Buwitt	CDU
Berlin	257	Berlin-Mitte – Prenzlauer Berg – Weißensee I	Wolfgang Thierse	SPD
Berlin	258	Berlin-Pankow – Hohenschönhausen – Weißensee II	Konrad Elmer	SPD
Berlin	259	Berlin-Friedrichshain – Treptow – Lichtenberg I	Nils Diederich	SPD
Berlin	260	Berlin-Köpenick – Lichtenberg II	Siegfried Scheffler	SPD
Berlin	261	Berlin-Hellersdorf – Marzahn	Gregor Gysi	PDS
Berlin	List		Angelika Barbe	SPD
Berlin	List		Siegrun Klemmer	SPD
Berlin	List		Renate Rennebach	SPD
Berlin	List		Hans-Jochen Vogel	SPD
Berlin	List		Gerd Wartenberg	SPD
Berlin	List		Sabine Bergmann-Pohl	CDU
Berlin	List		Horst Gibtner	CDU
Berlin	List		Heinrich Lummer	CDU
Berlin	List		Werner Skowron	CDU
Berlin	List		Wolfgang Lüder	FDP
Berlin	List		Klaus Röhl	FDP
Berlin	List		Jürgen Starnick	FDP
Berlin	List		Petra Bläss	PDS
Berlin	List		Ilja Seifert	PDS
Berlin	List		Gerd Poppe	Greens
Mecklenburg-Vorpommern	262	Wismar – Gadebusch – Grevesmühlen – Doberan – Bützow	Günther Krause	CDU
Mecklenburg-Vorpommern	263	Schwerin – Hagenow	Wolfgang Ehlers	CDU
Mecklenburg-Vorpommern	264	Güstrow – Sternberg – Lübz – Parchim – Ludwigslust	Günter Marten	CDU
Mecklenburg-Vorpommern	265	Rostock	Christine Lucyga	SPD
Mecklenburg-Vorpommern	266	Rostock-Land – Ribnitz-Damgarten – Teterow – Malchin	Elisabeth Grochtmann	CDU
Mecklenburg-Vorpommern	267	Stralsund – Rügen – Grimmen	Angela Merkel	CDU
Mecklenburg-Vorpommern	268	Greifswald – Wolgast – Demmin	Ulrich Adam	CDU
Mecklenburg-Vorpommern	269	Neubrandenburg – Altentreptow – Waren – Röbel	Paul Krüger	CDU
Mecklenburg-Vorpommern	270	Neustrelitz – Strasburg – Pasewalk – Ueckermünde – Anklam	Susanne Jaffke	CDU
Mecklenburg-Vorpommern	List		Hans-Joachim Hacker	SPD
Mecklenburg-Vorpommern	List		Ulrich Janzen	SPD
Mecklenburg-Vorpommern	List		Hinrich Kuessner	SPD
Mecklenburg-Vorpommern	List		Andrea Lederer	PDS
Mecklenburg-Vorpommern	List		Hans Modrow	PDS
Mecklenburg-Vorpommern	List		Rainer Ortleb	FDP
Mecklenburg-Vorpommern	List		Klaus-Dieter Feige	Greens
Brandenburg	271	Neuruppin – Kyritz – Wittstock – Pritzwalk – Perleberg	Rosemarie Priebus	CDU
Brandenburg	272	Prenzlau – Angermünde – Schwedt – Templin – Gransee	Markus Meckel	SPD
Brandenburg	273	Oranienburg – Nauen	Karl-Heinz Schröter	SPD
Brandenburg	274	Eberswalde – Bernau – Bad Freienwalde	Immo Lieberoth	CDU
Brandenburg	275	Brandenburg a.d. Havel – Rathenow – Belzig	Hans-Hinrich Knaape	SPD
Brandenburg	276	Potsdam	Emil Schnell	SPD
Brandenburg	277	Fürstenwalde – Strausberg – Seelow	Rainer Eppelmann	CDU
Brandenburg	278	Luckenwalde – Zossen – Jüterbog – Königs Wusterhausen	Herbert Meißner	SPD
Brandenburg	279	Frankfurt (Oder) – Eisenhüttenstadt – Beeskow	Ulrich Junghanns	CDU
Brandenburg	280	Cottbus – Guben – Forst	Michael Wonneberger	CDU
Brandenburg	281	Senftenberg – Calau – Spremberg	Thomas Molnar	CDU
Brandenburg	282	Bad Liebenwerda – Finsterwalde – Herzberg – Lübben – Luckau	Michael Stübgen	CDU
Brandenburg	List		Jutta Braband (Note: Jutta Braband resigned on 2 May 1992.)	PDS
Brandenburg	List		Dagmar Enkelmann	PDS
Brandenburg	List		Dietmar Keller	PDS
Brandenburg	List		Ingeborg Philipp (Note: Ingeborg Philipp took office on 21 May 1992, to succeed Jutta Braband.)	PDS
Brandenburg	List		Holger Bartsch	SPD
Brandenburg	List		Stephan Hilsberg	SPD
Brandenburg	List		Jörg Wolfgang Ganschow	FDP
Brandenburg	List		Jürgen Türk	FDP
Brandenburg	List		Christina Schenk	Greens
Brandenburg	List		Konrad Weiß	Greens
Brandenburg	List		Lothar de Maizière (Note: Lothar de Maizière resigned on 15 October 1991.)	CDU
Brandenburg	List		Else Ackermann (Note: Else Ackermann took office on 22 October 1991, to succeed Lothar de Maizière.)	CDU
Saxony-Anhalt	283	Altmark	Rudolf Karl Krause	CDU
Saxony-Anhalt	284	Elbe-Havel-Gebiet und Haldensleben – Wolmirstedt	Hans-Joachim Sopart (Note: Hans-Joachim Sopart resigned on 3 January 1993.)	CDU
Saxony-Anhalt	285	Harz und Vorharzgebiet	Monika Brudlewsky	CDU
Saxony-Anhalt	286	Magdeburg	Klaus Mildner	CDU
Saxony-Anhalt	287	Magdeburg – Schönebeck – Wanzleben – Staßfurt	Hartmut Büttner	CDU
Saxony-Anhalt	288	Wittenberg – Gräfenhainichen – Jessen – Roßlau – Zerbst	Ulrich Petzold	CDU
Saxony-Anhalt	289	Dessau – Bitterfeld	Wolfgang Krause	CDU
Saxony-Anhalt	290	Bernburg – Aschersleben – Quedlinburg	Reiner Krziskewitz	CDU
Saxony-Anhalt	291	Halle-Altstadt	Uwe Lühr	FDP
Saxony-Anhalt	292	Halle-Neustadt – Saalkreis – Köthen	Manfred Lischewski	CDU
Saxony-Anhalt	293	Merseburg – Querfurt – Weißenfels	Clemens Schwalbe	CDU
Saxony-Anhalt	294	Zeitz – Hohenmölsen – Naumburg – Nebra	Harald Schreiber (Note: Harald Schreiber resigned on 30 June 1993.)	CDU
Saxony-Anhalt	295	Eisleben – Hettstedt – Sangerhausen	Heinz Rother	CDU
Saxony-Anhalt	List		Eberhard Brecht	SPD
Saxony-Anhalt	List		Evelin Fischer	SPD
Saxony-Anhalt	List		Manfred Hampel	SPD
Saxony-Anhalt	List		Christel Hanewinckel	SPD
Saxony-Anhalt	List		Uwe Küster	SPD
Saxony-Anhalt	List		Reinhard Weis	SPD
Saxony-Anhalt	List		Heinz-Dieter Hackel	FDP
Saxony-Anhalt	List		Sigrid Hoth	FDP
Saxony-Anhalt	List		Bruno Menzel	FDP
Saxony-Anhalt	List		Hans P. H. Schuster	FDP
Saxony-Anhalt	List		Bernd Henn	PDS
Saxony-Anhalt	List		Fritz Schumann	PDS
Saxony-Anhalt	List		Ingrid Köppe	Greens
Saxony-Anhalt	List		Jürgen Wohlrabe (Note: Jürgen Wohlrabe took office on 5 January 1993, to succeed Hans-Joachim Sopart.)	CDU
Saxony-Anhalt	List		Manfred Schell (Note: Manfred Schell took office on 22 July 1993, to succeed Harald Schreiber.)	CDU
Thuringia	296	Nordhausen – Worbis – Heiligenstadt	Gerhard Reddemann	CDU
Thuringia	297	Eisenach – Mühlhausen	Manfred Heise	CDU
Thuringia	298	Sömmerda – Artern – Sondershausen – Langensalza	Martin Göttsching	CDU
Thuringia	299	Gotha – Arnstadt	Gerhard Päselt	CDU
Thuringia	300	Erfurt	Norbert Otto	CDU
Thuringia	301	Weimar – Apolda – Erfurt-Land	Heinz-Jürgen Kronberg	CDU
Thuringia	302	Jena – Rudolstadt – Stadtroda	Udo Haschke	CDU
Thuringia	303	Gera-Stadt – Eisenberg – Gera-Land I	Hans-Ulrich Köhler	CDU
Thuringia	304	Altenburg – Schmölln – Greiz – Gera-Land II	Harald Kahl	CDU
Thuringia	305	Saalfeld – Pößneck – Schleiz – Lobenstein – Zeulenroda	Kersten Wetzel	CDU
Thuringia	306	Meiningen – Bad Salzungen – Hildburghausen – Sonneberg	Arnulf Kriedner	CDU
Thuringia	307	Suhl – Schmalkalden – Ilmenau – Neuhaus	Claudia Nolte	CDU
Thuringia	List		Iris Gleicke	SPD
Thuringia	List		Christoph Matschie	SPD
Thuringia	List		Gerhard Neumann	SPD
Thuringia	List		Gisela Schröter	SPD
Thuringia	List		Wieland Sorge	SPD
Thuringia	List		Karlheinz Guttmacher	FDP
Thuringia	List		Heinz Hübner (Note: Heinz Hübner resigned on 12 May 1992.)	FDP
Thuringia	List		Eva Pohl	FDP
Thuringia	List		Christoph Schnittler (Note: Christoph Schnittler took office on 22 May 1992, to succeed Heinz Hübner.)	FDP
Thuringia	List		Ursula Fischer	PDS
Thuringia	List		Gerhard Riege (Note: Gerhard Riege died on 15 February 1992.)	PDS
Thuringia	List		Ruth Fuchs (Note: Ruth Fuchs took office on 11 March 1992, to succeed Gerhard Riege.)	PDS
Thuringia	List		Vera Lengsfeld	Greens
Saxony	308	Delitzsch – Eilenburg – Torgau – Wurzen	Angelika Pfeiffer	CDU
Saxony	309	Leipzig I	Hermann Pohler	CDU
Saxony	310	Leipzig II	Gerhard Schulz	CDU
Saxony	311	Leipzig-Land – Borna – Geithain	Rolf Rau	CDU
Saxony	312	Döbeln – Grimma – Oschatz	Manfred Kolbe	CDU
Saxony	313	Meißen – Riesa – Großenhain	Hans-Dirk Bierling	CDU
Saxony	314	Hoyerswerda – Kamenz – Weißwasser	Ulrich Klinkert	CDU
Saxony	315	Görlitz – Zittau – Niesky	Georg Janovsky	CDU
Saxony	316	Bautzen – Löbau	Gottfried Haschke	CDU
Saxony	317	Pirna – Sebnitz – Bischofswerda	Klaus Brähmig	CDU
Saxony	318	Dresden I	Hans Geisler (Note: Hans Geisler resigned on 12 February 1991.)	CDU
Saxony	319	Dresden II	Johannes Nitsch	CDU
Saxony	320	Dresden-Land – Freital – Dippoldiswalde	Rainer Jork	CDU
Saxony	321	Freiberg – Brand-Erbisdorf – Flöha – Marienberg	Joachim Schmidt	CDU
Saxony	322	Glauchau – Rochlitz – Hohenstein-Ernstthal – Hainichen	Joachim, Count of Schönburg-Glauchau (Note: Joachim, Count of Schönburg-Glauchau resigned on 30 June 1994.)	CDU
Saxony	323	Chemnitz I	Rudolf Meinl	CDU
Saxony	324	Chemnitz II – Chemnitz-Land	Klaus Reichenbach	CDU
Saxony	325	Annaberg – Stollberg – Zschopau	Wolfgang Engelmann	CDU
Saxony	326	Aue – Schwarzenberg – Klingenthal	Wolfgang Dehnel	CDU
Saxony	327	Zwickau – Werdau	Michael Luther	CDU
Saxony	328	Reichenbach – Plauen – Auerbach – Oelsnitz	Bertram Wieczorek (Note: Bertram Wieczorek resigned on 31 January 1994.)	CDU
Saxony	List		Renate Jäger	SPD
Saxony	List		Regina Kolbe	SPD
Saxony	List		Dietmar Matterne	SPD
Saxony	List		Christian Müller	SPD
Saxony	List		Helga Otto	SPD
Saxony	List		Rolf Schwanitz	SPD
Saxony	List		Gerald Thalheim	SPD
Saxony	List		Gunter Weißgerber	SPD
Saxony	List		Joachim Günther	FDP
Saxony	List		Wolfgang Mischnick	FDP
Saxony	List		Arno Schmidt	FDP
Saxony	List		Jürgen Schmieder	FDP
Saxony	List		Sigrid Semper	FDP
Saxony	List		Ulrich Briefs	PDS
Saxony	List		Uwe-Jens Heuer	PDS
Saxony	List		Barbara Höll	PDS
Saxony	List		Angela Stachowa	PDS
Saxony	List		Werner Schulz	Greens
Saxony	List		Wolfgang Ullmann	Greens
Saxony	List		Maria Michalk (Note: Maria Michalk took office on 13 February 1991, to succeed Hans Geisler.)	CDU
Saxony	List		Christa Schmidt (Note: Christa Schmidt took office on 1 February 1994, to succeed Bertram Wieczorek.)	CDU
Saxony	List		Lothar Handschack (Note: Lothar Handschack took office on 1 July 1994, to succeed Joachim, Count of Schönburg-Glauchau.)	CDU

== See also ==
- Politics of Germany
- List of Bundestag Members
