= Gerhard Riege =

German politician (1930–1992)

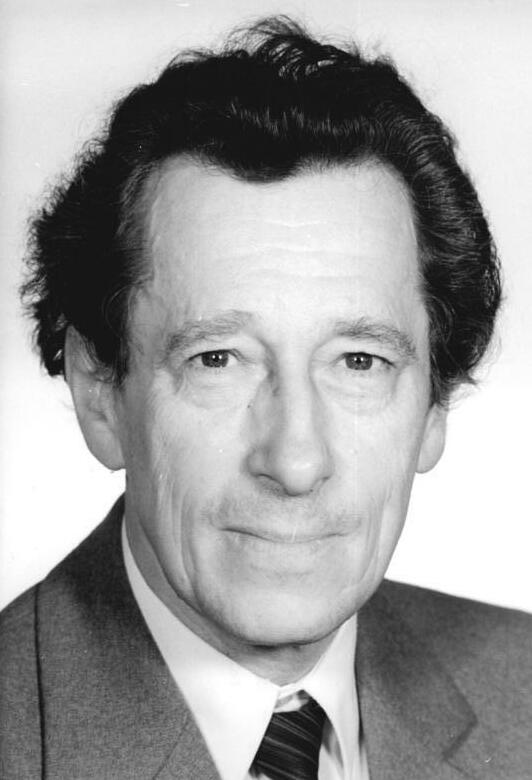
1990

Gerhard Riege (23 May 1930 - 15 February 1992) was a respected East German law professor.

On 18 March 1990 East Germany held the first truly free election in that part of Germany since 1932. Riege had accepted nomination as a list candidate for the electoral district of Thuringia, and was elected to the East German Volkskammer (national parliament). On 3 October 1990 he was one of 144 nominated Volkskammer members who moved across to the enlarged German Bundestag (national parliament) following reunification. He was then elected to the Bundestag in the December general election later that year.

The media soul-searching, which found a focus deep inside the political class, and which followed Gerhard Riege's suicide, reflected many enduring dilemmas and discomfitures that have followed in the wake of reunification.

== Life ==
=== Provenance and early years ===
Gerhard Riege was born into a working-class family at Gräfenroda, a small town known throughout Germany for the production of garden gnomes, located along the Wilde Gera valley in the hills south of Erfurt. His father worked as an artisanal glass blower. As he matured, he showed a particular interest in Philosophy, History and Art history. He left school at fourteen and trained for work as a postman. Shortly after this, the telephone connections were cut and the trainee postman was given a telegram to take through to the forest. His orders were to deliver it by hand to a satellite concentration camp of the Buchenwald complex. While visiting the camp, he met a group of half-starved camp detainees, closely guarded by armed, smartly uniformed officers. He would later recall the encounter as a formative element of his later life. He became the "most-determined anti-fascist imaginable".

Roughly one year after his recruitment into the postal service, the war ended. After May 1945, the entire central portion of Germany was administered as the Soviet occupation zone (to be relaunched in October 1949 as the Soviet-sponsored German Democratic Republic (East Germany). Under the egalitarian precepts of the military administrators he was chosen to return to school in order to complete the Abitur, the schools' final exam leading to university-level education. He graduated from his "Aufbaugymnasium" (secondary school) at nearby Neudietendorf in 1949 and moved to the University of Jena, where he studied for a degree not in Philosophy or History, but in Jurisprudence.

=== Friedrich-Schiller University of Jena ===
After passing the state law exams in 1953, he stayed on at the university faculty of Jurisprudence, employed as an assistant. His doctorate followed in 1957 in return for a dissertation on the representative system [of government] in Europe's people's democracies. (Note: Das Vertretungssystem in den volksdemokratischen Ländern Europas) He had already, in 1954, taken up a tutorial position, having thereby becoming the youngest don at the university giving tutorials in constitutional law. It was again at Jena that he received his habilitation in 1964, which opened the way to a life-long career in the universities sector. This time his dissertation concerned "East German citizenship". The next year he accepted the Jena university professorship in Public Law. Between 1974 and 1983 he also served as dean of the Social Sciences faculty.

On 23 January 1990 Riege was elected to the university rectorship. However, due to "procedural errors" the election was re-run, and this time Riege, deeply upset by the whole business, did not resubmit himself for election. The period was one of intensified political turmoil, and it would appear that the objections from those who had complained related to their identification of Riege as a "party official" of the country's ruling Socialist Unity Party. Sources are divided in their evaluation of the incident. Ironically, the previous time he had sought election as Jena's university rector it had been party pressure that had blocked his election.

=== Politics ===
With the collapse of the Hitler government the ban on non-Nazi political parties lapsed and was lifted. The Socialist Unity Party (Sozialistische Einheitspartei Deutschlands / SED) was formed in April 1946 through the contentious merger of the former Communist Party and Social Democratic Party. Although there are indications that the engineers of the merger intended that it should be implemented in all four occupied zones, it was only effected in the Soviet occupation zone. Driven by passionate anti-fascism and a determination that divisions on the political left should never again permit the emergence of a nationalist-populist government, Gerhard Riege was one of hundreds of thousands of Communists and others who promptly enrolled in the Socialist Unity Party of Germany, which over the next few years emerged as the ruling party in the National Front of the German Democratic Republic's single-party dictatorship, closely modelled on the Leninist model which the Ulbricht leadership team had studied in depth during their political exile in Moscow before 1945. Although a committed anti-fascist socialist, and therefore part of the political mainstream, there is no reason to believe that Gerhard Riege was a political activist during his student years, nor indeed during his time as a university teacher during the four decades following the founding of the state in October 1949. Sources indicate that at least by the standards of those times he was apolitical. For supporters and sympathisers, it is simply preposterous to believe that his academic success was in any way connected with Riege's party membership. Within academia, he was respected on account of his personal ability and integrity. He was able to present objectively based arguments through the power of his intellect. Those who agreed and those who disagreed with his point of view could join in admiring the consistency of his intellectual positions, which were always philosophically aligned with the party's intellectual underpinnings, but which could never have been perceived as partisan or (even) intolerant. Admirers would recall not just his integrity and openness, but also his scrupulous politeness. Guido Henke, a former law student of Riege's who subsequently worked for him in a political capacity during the early 1990s, described him as "a fine person, one of those who would apologise three times to an interlocutor before lifting the receiver if the telephone rang [during a one-on-one meeting]".

=== Ministry for State Security ===
Documents that surfaced after 1990 disclosed that in 1954 Gerhard Riege signed the a "declaration of obligation" statement in favour of the Ministry for State Security (Stasi). This triggered the (already increasingly standardised) process whereby East German citizens enrolled as "Informeller Mitarbeiter" ("IM" / Stasi informers). Riege's senior position in a prestigious university gave him an unusual level of access to university teachers and other people of influence over current and future generations of opinion formers. For the security services, with their traditional mistrust of "intellectuals", he would have been a prime target, and his unswerving support of anti-fascist Socialism would have encouraged handlers to think him "reliable", even if there is no indication that he was much of a party activist - at least before 1990. The Ministry for State Security were meticulous and complete in their record keeping. In October 1990, directly after reunification, the government set up the Stasi Records Agency to organise and administer the surviving Stasi archives. The agency is generally identified in archives from the period as the Gauck Commission: Joachim Gauck was the Federal Commissioner who headed it up between 1991 and 2000. It is unsurprising that Gerhard Riege was among the first of those on whom Stasi records were identified, sorted and consulted.

Gerhard Riege was an active "IM" between 1954 and 1960. When invited to comment more than thirty years later, Riege pleaded forgetfulness. Given that professorial absent-mindedness was an aspect of Riege's personality that colleagues would have completely recognised, this was not a totally implausible explanation. However, when presented with more evidence, he recalled that he had agreed to help the Ministry officials as requested in 1954 because he had been trying to obtain an exit visa in order to undertake a research visit to the west: it had been explained to him that without helping the security services as requested, the privilege of foreign travel would never be his. After the Gauck commission had reviewed the relevant Stasi files, they concluded that the reports Riege furnished on colleagues were few in number and insubstantial in content. From the six years that he was an active "IM", there were only four surviving reports. Given that some Stasi files were hastily burned when East Germany collapsed, it is impossible to be sure that he only submitted four reports on "persons of interest to the authorities" over the six years between 1954 and 1960, but there is no evidence of Stasi efforts to retain his service or re-recruit him after 1960. According to at least one source, subsequently researched Stasi files disclosed that it was indeed on 3 March 1960 that Riege "refused further [Stasi] contact". No former academic colleagues or students have come forward since Riege's suicide claiming that they suffered state-sponsored injury "Zersetzung" on account of potentially sensitive information on them shared by Riege with Stasi handlers. As far as the availability of evidence allows, it is accordingly reasonable to endorse the conclusions of the Gauck commission that Riege's activity and impact as a registered Stasi informer were insubstantial (unerheblich) and insignificance (eher bedeutungslos).

=== The politician ===
By the time, in November 1989, that the wall was breached by street protestors and it became clear that watching Soviet troops had received no instructions to preserve or restore the old political status quo, the German Democratic Republic faced more than mere financial bankruptcy. In the context of the dismal personal chemistry between Mikhail Gorbachev and Erich Honecker, and confronted by the winds of Glasnost blowing from, of all places, Moscow, the East German leadership experienced a rapid collapse in self-confidence which was reflected in the dissolution from within of the repressive apparatus that had been constructed over forty years by the Ministry for State Security. The ruling Socialist Unity Party (SED) hastily rebranded itself for a more democratic future as the Party of Democratic Socialism (PDS). (Re-engineering the party's inner soul would take a little longer.) SED loyalists, including Gerhard Riege, unhesitatingly signed their party membership over to the PDS. A general election was arranged for 18 March 1990. It would be the first (and last) East German general election in which the outcome had not been predetermined by the leaders of the ruling SED long before a single vote had been cast. For the "new" party there was an urgent need to field candidates who were competent and politically reliable, but who would not turn out to have been implicated in inhuman forms of political repression since 1949. The academic world was an obvious place to search for candidates, but most of the politically reliable were plainly unfamiliar with notions of multi-party democracy and had little credibility internationally. Gerhard Riege already had political experience as a former member of the Gera district Council and he enjoyed a certain level of academic recognition outside East Germany. He accepted nomination as a PDS candidate for the general election. Under the western-style proportional representation system introduced for the election, his name was included on the party list for an electoral district corresponding approximately with the former (and after 1990 re-established) state of Thuringia. To the surprise of commentators, when the votes were counted, it became apparent that his name had been high enough up on the party list to secure his election as a member of the Volkskammer, East Germany's national parliament (which had hitherto been widely viewed by "voters" as a "rubber stamp" for decisions already taken elsewhere, within the Party Central Committee).

In the Bundestag Gerhard Riege tried to contribute to the creation of a new constitution for a newly united Germany. As a leading professor of constitutional law from the eastern half of the new state he was well qualified for the task. There had certainly been positive reactions from western constitutional experts in response to early drafts drawn up under his direction during 1989/90. However, the political power, backed by the economic muscle and the simple demographic differences between east and west meant that reunited Germany ended up with the constitutional arrangements of former West Germany. In the west there were certainly compromises made that involved adopting elements of the East German constitutional arrangements, notably in respect of abortion law, but from the perspective of the "new federal states", the state that emerged from German reunification was in most respects and enlarged version of what had been West Germany, with constitutional arrangements essentially those promulgated on 8 May 1949 in the Basic Law for the Federal Republic of Germany. Surviving sources focus less on Riege's contribution to the German constitutional settlement after 1990, and more on the circumstances under which his Bundestag career came to an end in 1992.

=== A scapegoat? ===
After 1990 many East German politicians who were serious about building or sustaining a post-reunification political career hastened to condemn the dictatorship and the party they had previously served. That was not Gerhard Riege's approach. As an East German professor of constitutional law he had never eulogised the achievements of the former SED régime without qualification, and as a post-unification member of the Bundestag, he sustained a scholarly and essentially nuanced approach, generally avoiding gratuitous judgmentalism. Meanwhile, among the Bundestag members representing the (formerly western) centre-right CDU/CSU coalition, there were those who found themselves reluctant or unable to avoid a certain triumphalism. It is not entirely clear from sources precisely when suspicions on the political right that Gerhard Riege's disinclination unambiguously to condemn his (East German) socialist past meant that he "must have been" working for the hated Stasi were complemented and then supported up by emerging rumours, followed by initially imprecise reports, that the "Gauck Commission" had indeed found evidence in the Stasi archives that Riege had been an "IM" (Stasi informer). Throughout his relatively brief Bundestag career Gerhard Riege did, in any event, attract more criticism and gratuitous taunts than other PDS members from the more triumphalist (formerly western) assembly members.

- "Mir fehlt die Kraft zum Leben und zum Kämpfen. Sie ist mir in der neuen Freiheit genommen worden. Ich habe Angst vor der Öffentlichkeit, wie sie von den Medien geschaffen wird und gegen die ich mich nicht wahren kann. Ich habe, Angst vor dem Haß, der mir im Bundestag entgegenschlägt."
- "I did not have the power to live on and fight. It was taken from me in the new freedom. I am afraid of the publicity which they create in the media, and against which I cannot protect myself. I am frightened of the hatred rising up against me in the Bundestag."

Gerhard Riege in the suicide note addressed to his wife and children which was found after he hanged himself from the tree in his allotment

On 13 March 1991 Riege delivered a speech to the Bundestag on behalf of the PDS concerning the government's budget proposals. It lasted seven minutes, and was notable not so much for its content, which was characteristically analytical and thoughtful, as for the bitter personal hostility with which it was greeted. The official record of it lists no fewer than 33 discernible heckles from Joseph-Theodor Blank and others from the right wing of the government coalition, and references further undiscernible interventions. Examples included the following:

- "But now you're defending the old régime! If I were in your position I'd be ashamed!"
- "You should not be using the word 'Recht' (meaning both 'law' and 'right') at all. So embarrassing!" (Note: "Sie sollten das Wort Recht überhaupt nicht in den Mund nehmen! Peinlich, so was!")
- "What one has to listen to from a Stasi-Heini..."
- "The time when only you and your kind were allowed to speak is gone."[after, presumably due to the interruptions, Riege had over-run his allotted time by more than 90 seconds]

Riege was badly shaken up by the cumulative impact of the hysterical reactions of these CDU/CSU parliamentarians.

=== Final days ===
Several sources on the matter which appeared only after Riege's death place emphasis on his temperamental unsuitability for national politics. For Riege, education and scholarship were the priority. "East Germany is a country where people read" (Note: "Die DDR ist ein Leseland!.") was the proud boast of this Schubert-loving professor on behalf of his countrymen, apparently without quite acknowledging the price paid by some of those East German citizens less privileged than he. He was a sensitive legal scholar and not mentally equipped either to lock horns with parliamentary street-fighters or to find himself on the receiving end of the media hate-campaign to which he was already being subjected. In 1990, as a result of reunification, he had also, like others, undergone the rapid and permanent upending of basic socialist certainties. In that respect, as later became clear, Riege's ongoing state of shock and depression during his final two years of life reflected the experiences of millions of East Germans at the time. On Monday 10 February 1992, five days before his suicide, Riege confided to his parliamentary assistant, "I hope I'll get through this week!". (Note: "Hoffentlich überstehe ich die Woche!") It was the start of a week during which the "Gauck Commission" findings into his work for the Ministry For State Security (Stasi) during the 1950s were to be made available. If his memory of the Stasi relationship was truly as hazy as he had recently intimated to Bundestag comrades, he can have had little idea what the Gauck Commission findings would be. But he was terrified of the press reaction, of the unthinking "small-town" reactions of the people he came across in his daily life in and around the university, and indeed of the reactions of his own party colleagues who were in many cases, he sensed, already instinctively distancing themselves from him.

On the evening of 14 February 1992 Gerhard Riege drove to Erfurt to take part in a meeting with his regional party leadership. There was but a single item on the agenda: the Stasi. While comrades discussed Riege's "Stasi past" with him, across town the newspaper presses started running. In a piece of slightly more than thirty lines they reported that three of the PDS Bundestag members had been "IMs" (Stasi informers). The reports added that other PDS Bundestag members had not seen that as any reason to demonstrate suspicion of the three parliamentary comrades in question. Afterwards, media defenders were keen to stress the strictly factual nature of the press reports. There had been no malice, no hounding; merely execution of the duty of the press to report the facts. Nevertheless, when Riege left the party meeting later that Thursday evening, he was, in words repeated by more than one commentator, "a broken man".

Karin Keschuba, the regional party chairwoman and leader of the Erfurt meeting, later agreed that participants had "discussed between themselves", (Note: "Wir haben auf dieser Sitzung miteinander geredet wie früher bei der SED.") as they had at so many meetings before the rebranding and relaunch of the old SED. Neither Keschuba nor her fellow participants were keen to discuss the Erfurt meeting in much detail partly, according to one of them, out of respect for Riege's widow. But Keschuba did accept that, perhaps, the "human dimension of the problem" had, with the benefit of hindsight, been to some extent overlooked. Professor [Riege] had three times stressed that he had simply forgotten "the matter" [of his Stasi contacts]. Dieter Strützel, the regional party deputy chair, who was also present, later shared his impression that "Riege sometimes seemed not to know what else to do. He seemed to me helpless .... completely changed". Several sources indicate that by the end of the meeting, rightly or wrongly, Riege had simply concluded that, after backing and belonging to the party for more than forty years, he was now being "dumped" by party comrades.

Shortly before leaving home on the morning of Friday 15 February 1992, Gerhard Riege asked his wife, "What will Mangoldt think of me now?" (Hans von Mangoldt was a law professor at the University of Tübingen and a long-standing friend.) He then drove to his vegetable allotment on the edge of town where a few hours later a neighbour found his body hanging by the neck from a tree. That afternoon the snow began to melt.

=== Afterwards ===
Riege left behind a lengthy suicide letter addressed to his wife and three grown-up children. The letter was widely reported and selectively quoted over the next few days, along with reports of the savage exchanges to which Riege had been exposed since becoming a member of the Bundestag.

The suicide triggered consternation across the political spectrum. There was a widespread consensus that "Lessons must be learned" and not a little bitterness, especially from (former) East Germans, that Riege had been hounded to his death by (formerly West German) political opponents. For instance, the president of the Thuringia Landtag (state parliament), Gottfried Müller (CDU)) wrote in his telegram of condolence to Riege's widow that it was an absolute necessity to deal with the [East German] past with a greater sense of justice, and in ways that displayed humanity and political wisdom.

== Personal ==
Gerhard Riege was married with three children. His daughter Katharina is a biographer of Hans Mahle.

== Awards and prizes (selection) ==
- 1988 National Prize of the German Democratic Republic Class III for Academic Achievement, Science and Technology

== Publications (selection) ==
- Die Rolle der Wahlen in der Deutschen Demokratischen Republik, Berlin 1958
- Zwei Staaten, zwei Staatsbürgerschaften, Berlin 1967
- with Paul Fiedler. Die Friedrich-Schiller-Universität Jena in der Hochschulreform. Berlin 1969
- Der Bürger im sozialistischen Staat, Berlin 1973
- with Hans-Jürgen Kulke, Nationalität deutsch, Staatsbürgerschaft DDR. Berlin 1979
- Zur Geschichte und Funktion der politischen und persönlichen Grundrechte in der DDR. Studie, Jena 1984
- as editor-compiler, Dokumente zum Thüringer Staatsrecht. 1920–1952. Stuttgart 1991
- with Uwe-Jens Heuer, Der Rechtsstaat – eine Legende? Erfahrungen zweier Rechtswissenschaftler 1990/91 in Volkskammer und Bundestag. Baden-Baden 1992
