= Wolfgang Roth (politician) =

German politician (1941–2021)

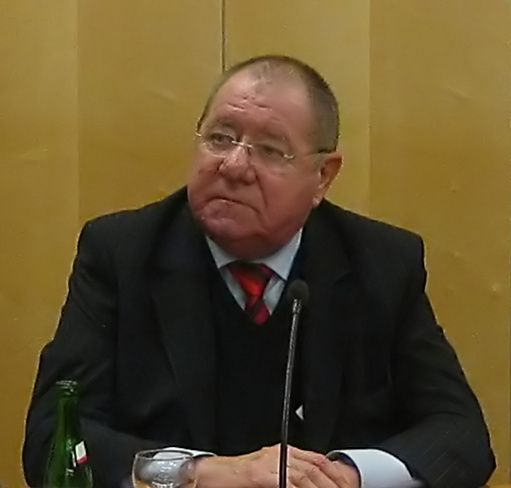
- Roth in 2012

Member of the Bundestag
- In office 1976–1993

Vice President of the European Investment Bank
- In office 1993–2006

Personal details
- Born: 26 January 1941; Schwäbisch Hall, Baden-Württemberg, Germany
- Died: 4 July 2021 (aged 80); Bonn, North Rhine-Westphalia, Germany
- Political party: Social Democratic Party of Germany (SPD)

Wolfgang Roth (26 January 1941 – 4 July 2021) was a German politician and member of the Social Democratic Party of Germany (SPD). He was a member of the German Bundestag from 1976 until 1993. Roth was the vice president of the European Investment Bank from 1993 to 2006.

== Education ==
After graduating from the Schubart-Gymnasium in Aalen, Roth studied economics in Tübingen and at the Free University of Berlin, where he held the office of AStA chairman and Berlin state chairman in the Association of German Student Bodies (VDS) in 1964. He graduated in 1968 with a degree in economics.

== Political career ==
Roth joined the SPD in 1962 and initially became involved in the Social Democratic University Association. He was deputy chairman of the Jusos from 1969 to 1972 and then chairman from 1972 to 1974.

Roth was first elected to the German Bundestag in 1976 on the state list of the Baden-Württemberg SPD. He was the SPD's economic policy spokesman there and Deputy Chairman of the SPD parliamentary group from 1981 to 1991. Following his appointment as Vice-President of the European Investment Bank, Wolfgang Roth resigned his seat in the Bundestag on 2 September 1993.
