= Jutta Braband =

German politician (born 1949)

Judith Braband before 2002 Jutta Braband
- Born: Jutta Czichotzke; 13 March 1949 (age 77); Barth, Mecklenburg-Vorpommern, Soviet occupation zone
- Occupations: Political activist Bundestag member
- Political party: SED; PDS
- Spouse: (divorced)
- Children: 2

Jutta Braband (born Jutta Czichotzke, 13 March 1949) is a German former politician. In the German Democratic Republic she was a civil rights activist who after 1990 became a PDS member of the Germany parliament (Bundestag). Her parliamentary career ended in May 1992 after it had become known that fifteen years earlier she had worked for the Ministry for State Security (Stasi) as a registered informant ("inoffizieller Mitarbeiter").

== Life ==
=== Provenance and early years ===
Jutta Czichotzke was born in Barth, a small town close to the northern coast of a region which at that time was administered as Germany's Soviet occupation zone. She grew up in nearby Stralsund. Her father was a building engineer: her mother was a police officer. Between 1965 and 1967 she undertook a traineeship in industry and commerce. She passed her school final exams (Abitur) and the local sixth form college and moved on to work in industry, first in Stralsund and later in Berlin. She also, aged just 18, joined the Socialist Unity Party ("Sozialistische Einheitspartei Deutschlands" / SED) which had become the country's ruling party by the time of the relaunch of the Soviet occupation zone as the German Democratic Republic (East Germany) back in October 1949. Passing the Abitur opened the way to tertiary education, and in 1969 she embarked on a course of study at the Academy for Foreign Trade in Berlin. However, in 1972 she was "dematriculated" from the course. Sources indicate that the reason given - insufficient intensity of study - were a pretext, and that her exclusion was implemented on "political grounds". She was sent to work in the manufacturing sector, becoming a skilled operative, and then a technical operative in a Berlin textiles factory and/or a Berlin electronics factory.

=== The party ===
The party was a central feature in Jutta Czichotzke's adult life. Her relationship with the Socialist Unity Party was a complicated one that changed over time. Her parents both became party members, and political indifference was not an option in the family home. She was a member of the Young Pioneers and then of the Free German Youth (effectively the youth wing of the ruling SED) and, after she was permitted to join the party itself on reaching the age of 18, proud to back the party ideals and keen to keep a finger on the party pulse. But she was also the young comrade who always had questions. For several years her questions were always dealt with in a friendly way, even though over time some of her questions became closer to criticisms. Combining her study at the Academy for Foreign Trade with a day job administering foreign trade imposed an awareness of political contradictions between political ideals and reality, and she became involved in disputes about ethical-moral questions. In August 1968 the invasion of Czechoslovakia by Warsaw Pact forces shocked her deeply: she became increasingly concerned with the way in which the identity of the officially identified "class enemy" changed over time. Around this time the East German government "normalised" diplomatic relations with Spain, a country ruled by Francisco Franco, a "Fascist" dictator against whom many comrades now living out their final decades in East Germany had fought during the Spanish Civil War in the 1930s. The attitude of the East German press to Spain suddenly reversed, while questionable invoicing practices that she encountered in her work, involving trade with Spain, seemed unchanged. In the political seminars which were a feature of office life in East Germany she found herself in confrontations with seminar leaders. The tolerance and honesty that had characterised earlier political discussions were no longer apparent and her job was downgraded.

Nevertheless, despite being formally "dematriculated" in 1972 she was able, by 1975, to complete her study course in foreign trade through "extramural study".

=== Stasi ===
Between 1971 and 1975 Braband was registered with the Ministry for State Security (Stasi) as an informant ("inoffizieller Mitarbeiter" / IM). This aspect of her life became public knowledge only in 1991 after German reunification which led to Stasi archives being opened up to the scrutiny of scholars, journalists, and citizens. Braband herself believed at the time that information she provided to her Stasi handlers was of little importance, but she nevertheless took the slightly unusually step of expressly ending her collaboration after four years. Later, in September 1991, presumably in the expectation that at some stage someone would find evidence of her collaboration in the Stasi files, she voluntarily admitted her Stasi collaboration during the early 1970s. Subsequent research of the records indicated that Braband's spying activities led to imprisonment for at least three fellow citizens. One of these was later condemned as a "western spy" and jailed, while she also disclosed the plans of two friends to escape the country, which led to the two of them being imprisoned. She later tried to put the Stasi collaboration out of her mind, but when confronted with the evidence of the archives she acknowledged that she had been stupid and naive, and that she must have signed a standard Stasi "Statement of obligation" ("Verpflichtungserklärung") and received both a Stasi cover name and, over the four years of her activity as an "IM", at least the 14,000 Marks disclosed by the records, in return for information provided.

=== Lifestyle changes ===
Around 1975, deciding that work could and should be fun, she embarked on a career as a freelance textiles and fashion designer, starting with a period as a trainee hand-weaver at a Berlin workshop. She withdrew from further active involvement with the party, acknowledging to herself that tight adherence to some kind of "party discipline" had not led to a better society.

Her lifestyle changes also brought her into contact with a number of new friends, many of whom would later come to be identified as "East German dissidents". These included Thomas Klein, Wolf Biermann, Bettina Wegner and Gerd Poppe. Like Braband, they had lost faith in the progress of the "developing socialist society". These friendships would have a lasting impact on her own life. In 1976, Wolf Biermann was stripped of his East German citizenship while on an officially authorized concert tour in West Germany. This was part of a larger sustained government campaign against people, often in the public eye, whose doubts about the political situation in East Germany had become known to the authorities (and, in many cases more significantly, to the wider public through word of mouth and the other informal communications channels of the time). Braband felt personally affected by the overtly political trials of Rupert Schröter and Rudi Molt, the house arrest of Robert Havemann and the sentencing of Rudolf Bahro.

=== Dissidence ===
In 1979 Braband and her friends learned that ten authors had been expelled from the German Writers' Association ("Deutscher Schriftstellerverband") because they had publicly opposed official criticism. Exclusion meant they would be unable to have their work published and effectively amounted to a writing ban in both halves of Germany. Jutta Braband, together with Thomas Klein and Stefan Fechner, reacted by drafting a joint letter of protest addressed to Erich Honecker, the country's leader, and soliciting others to join them in signing it. Braband now also formally resigned her membership of The Party. The text of the letter and the possible consequences of sending it were widely discussed between those involved, along with other related issues. Klein and Braband were identified as the leading instigators of the letter. They were both arrested and held in investigatory detention for seven months, after which, in April 1980, both were found guilty of "unlawful association" ("ungesetzlicher Verbindungsaufnahme") and sentenced to prison terms of 15 and 9 months respectively.

On her release Jutta Braband remained outside the political mainstream, and adhered to her "dissident" views, but while her political ideas continued to evolve, for most of the 1980s her dissent was more theoretical than activist. She now had a young daughter and in 1983 her son, Till, was born. She lived as a divorced single mother in Berlin. In 1982 she became a member of the Association of Visual Artists "Verband Bildender Künstler" / VBK. Her candidature was contentious because she had recently, as an East German citizen, worked with a West German film company. She would later pay tribute to the courage displayed by the VBK admissions panel which accepted her application in the face of significant official opposition to it. Membership opened the way for further training and progression in her career as a designer.

=== Changes ===
During the mid-1980s the winds of Perestroika blowing from, of all places, Moscow, allowed people to hope that a more democratic socialist future, with a less monolithic and oppressive political structure might become an option for East Germany. Developments in Moscow certainly undermined the confidence of the leadership in East Berlin, but from the perspective of citizens such as Braband the government response was one of increasing repression. This increasingly served to encourage street protests, however, as the realisation dawned on protesters and party leadership alike that the Soviet troops occupying the country might no longer be poised ready to intervene against civilian protesters as they had in 1953 and, more recently in Prague, in 1968. During 1989 what the authorities perceived as a dangerous and apparently unstoppable growth in street protests was seen by Jutta Braband (and many others), as a desperate response to government repression, above all on the part of young people. "In one sense, the middle of 1989 saw a mood of irrational grief and helplessness which slowly but steadily grew into an unstoppable rage". On 3 October 1989 Braband's own young teenage daughter was one of approximately 6,000 protesters who invaded the grounds of the Czechoslovak embassy in a desperate attempt to obtain permissions necessary escape from East Germany via Czechoslovakia, just as Communist victims of Nazi persecution had done more than half a century earlier. The real breakthrough this time came in November 1989, however, when the Berlin Wall was broken open and then crossed by street protestors. At that point it became screamingly obvious that the Soviet forces standing by had received no orders to intervene and rescue the Honecker government.

After that, political progress towards a more democratic version of socialism in East Germany became seemingly unstoppable. For many participants in the so-called Peaceful Revolution, combining the socialist ideals that the party had espoused with democratic structures in place of the repressive structures of the old German Democratic Republic became the goal. The reunification agenda was nevertheless impossible to ignore, given the economic bankruptcy of the East German state and the extent to which the political establishment had become discredited, while from the west came an unwavering commitment on the part of Helmut Kohl, Kremlin acquiescence having been secured, to implementing German reunification. Jutta Braband's perception of western society was not uncritical, however. She was opposed to what she saw as the west's masculine value system and the dominating role assigned to money, which perverted the possibilities for personal development. She was keen to work with others completely to democratise the "German Democratic Republic", and to ensure that fellow citizens were fully empowered through being informed about political developments. She was not in favour of some sort of incorporation of East Germany into an unreformed version of the German Federal Republic (West Germany).

In December 1989 Braband became a member of the newly created Independent Women's League (" Unabhängige Frauenverband" / UFV), a short-lived political party which four months later would be the only all-women political party to compete in East Germany's first (and as matters turned out last) free election. It was also in December 1989 that she joined and took a senior leadership position with United Left ("Vereinigte Linke" / VL), a grouping of left-wing opposition groups in East Germany dedicated to democratic reform. It was as the representative of the VL that she participated as a member in Berlin and nationally of the "Round Table" movement.

=== Bundestag ===
Reunification took place, formally, on 3 October 1990. A general election was held two months later. East Germany's old Socialist Unity Party had undergone a relaunch, and now presented itself as the Party of Democratic Socialism (PDS) as it came to terms with a multi-party democratic system. The proliferation of left-wing splinter groups that had been a feature of the German Democratic Republic during its final months now rapidly fizzled out, and it was on the candidate list of the PDS that Jutta Braband presented herself for election to the German parliament ("Bundestag"). Nationally the PDS secured a vote share slightly below 2.5%, but in former East Germany the party polled more strongly, and Braband's name was high enough up the party list for her to secure one of the 18 parliamentary seats allocated to it. However, in September 1991 she contributed an article to the newspaper Neues Deutschland that included a very public disclosure that for four years in her early 20s she had been in the pay of the Ministry for State Security (Stasi) as an informant ("inoffizieller Mitarbeiter" / IM). A media storm ensued and she resigned her seat in the Bundestag in April/May 1992.

=== After the Bundestag ===
In East Germany before 1989 Jutta Braband had supported herself as a free-lance fashion designer, but in the reunited Germany she found this career was no longer so readily available. She worked as a dress maker in 1994/95. Interviewed in 1998, however, she explained that "no one in East Berlin had any money for expensive clothes, and she could not afford to sell her things as cheaply as she had in the GDR". She quoted her daughter, by this time herself another single mother: "I'm going to find a rich man to support me." Although the remark was presented as a joke, it was not a joke that would have made much sense in the German Democratic Republic before 1990, where for a woman "that sort of dependence on a man was unknown". In 1993 she also became a trustee for the foundation responsible for the House of Democracy and Human Rights in Berlin, and chair of the trustees between 1997 and 2003. Between 1995 and 2005 she was chief executive of ACUD, a multi-faceted arts and culture centre in downtown Berlin. During this time, in 2002, she changed her forename from Jutta to Judith.
