= Christa Schmidt =

German politician (1941–2026)

Christa Schmidt (born Christa Weigel; 3 April 1941 – 10 June 2026) was a German politician (CDU). She served as a minister in the last government of East Germany. She had built an earlier career as a teacher and educationalist.

== Life and career ==
Christa Weigel was born in Leipzig during the first half of the Second World War. Between 1955 and 1959 she studied at a Teacher Training Institute for non-graduate teachers: between 1959 and 1964 she taught at the Goethe-School in Mügeln, a small town located a short distance to the east of Leipzig. She then switched to the Pestalozzi School for children with special needs in Leipzig, where she taught from 1964 till 1990.

By 1990 sources were describing Christa Schmidt as "married with two children".

In parallel with her teaching job, between 1972 and 1974 Schmidt studied successfully for a degree in Special School Pedagogy ("Sonderschulpädagogik") at the Martin Luther University of Halle-Wittenberg. Further study at the same institution led to her Doctorate of Pedagogy in 1980: her doctoral dissertation concerned handicapped school children. In 1982 she was promoted to the status of "Chief Teacher" ("Oberlehrer") and in 1988 she was promoted again, becoming an Education Councillor ("Studienrat").

Political engagement began in 1973 when, at the age of 32, Schmidt joined the Christian Democratic Union (CDU). The East German CDU lacked the autonomy of its West German counterpart, being a "bloc party" controlled through the country's so-called National Front by the country's ruling Socialist Unity Party ("Sozialistische Einheitspartei Deutschlands" / SED). Nevertheless, the East German CDU was not entirely without influence, and was allocated a fixed quota of around 50 seats in the National Parliament ("Volkskammer") even though general elections from 1949 until 1990 always resulted in more than 99% of the reported votes having been cast in support of the single candidate list provided by the ruling party. For Schmidt, between 1979 and 1989 CDU party membership was accompanied by a role as a deputy in the Central Leipzig City Assembly, where she worked on the Commission of Training and Education.

On 9 May 1990, Schmidt presented a report to the responsible parliamentary committee on some of her ministerial objectives:

"Although equal rights have been anchored in the constitution since 1949, they are not enforced. We still have a lot to do in order to assign to women the place in our society which is due to them. And this means that family and public life should no longer be based on the subordination principal, but on that of partnership. And here I want to use the word "Partnership" in a comprehensive sense: partnership in the family must be extended to include partnership in public life and partnership between employers and employees in order to serve the interests of families and of women."

"Obwohl seit 1949 die Gleichberechtigung in der Verfassung verankert ist, ist sie nicht durchgesetzt. Wir haben noch eine Menge zu tun, um den Frauen den Platz in unserer Gesellschaft einzuräumen, der ihnen zusteht. Und das bedeutet, das familiale und öfflentiche Leben darf sich nicht mehr nach dem Prinzip der Unterordnung, sondern muß sich nach dem Prinzip von Partnerschaft gestalten. Und hierbei möchte ich das Wort Partnerschaft durchaus umfassend verstehen: Partnerschaft in der Familie muß durch Partnerschaft in der Öffentlichkeit und durch Partnerschaft zwischen Arbeitgebern und Arbeitnehmern im Interesse von Familien und Frauen ergänzt werden."

In November 1989, following months of mounting street protests, the Berlin Wall was breached by demonstrators. Back in 1953 street protests had been brutally suppressed: in 1989 the realisation that Soviet occupation forces no longer had orders to suppress the protests using violence opened the way for a series of events which would lead to German reunification, formally in October 1990. In March 1990 the country held its first (and as matters turned out last) free parliamentary election. Based on the popular vote, the CDU now received not 50 seats but 163 of the 400 in the Volkskammer. Following a change in the law that had been voted through in February 1990, voters had no longer been restricted to a single party list, and Schmidt's name had been on the CDU party list for the Leipzig electoral district, positioned high enough up on the list for her now to be elected to the assembly. The powerful performance of the CDU meant that the task of forming a new East German government fell to the party chairman, Lothar de Maizière. In April Schmidt was appointed a minister, mandated to head up the newly formed Ministry for Family and Women ("Ministerium für Familie und Frauen").

The de Maizière cabinet ended in the context of German reunification on 3 October 1990, when what had been East Germany was incorporated into the German Federal Republic. 144 of the 400 members who had sat as members of the now defunct East German Volkskammer since March 1990 now became members of a newly enlarged Bundestag (upper parliamentary chamber) in the reunified Germany. Schmidt was one of these, remaining a member till the general election in December 1990. She returned to the Bundestag in February 1994, taking the seat vacated through the resignation from the chamber of the CDU member Bertram Wieczorek, who left in order to take on the chairmanship of Berlin's water supply company. Schmidt again remained a Bundestag member only till the next general election, which this time took place in October 1994, with the resulting change-over taking place two months later, in December.

In 1991 Schmidt resumed her work as an education professional, becoming vice-president of the Upper School Office (Oberschulamt) in Leipzig. At the same time she served during 1990–91 as chair of the (CDU) Women's Union for Saxony. In 1992 she took on the leadership of the Leipzig schools appointments department.

During 1992–93 she set up in the regional Saxony Culture Ministry a state institute for teachers of special needs and primary schools, herself taking on the role of its head. She continued in this post till her retirement in 2002.

Schmidt died on 10 June 2026, at the age of 85.
