= Barbara Weiler =

German politician (born 1946)

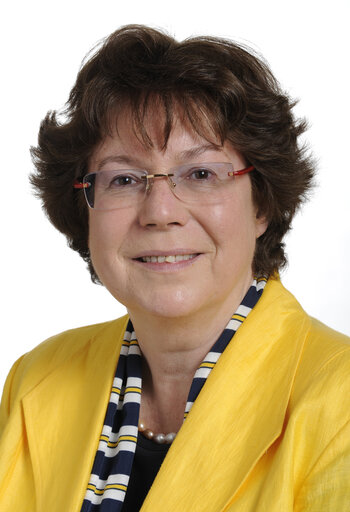
- Born: September 17, 1946 (age 79); Düsseldorf, Germany
- Occupation: Politician
- Office: Member of the European Parliament
- Political party: SPD

Barbara Weiler (born 17 September 1946 in Düsseldorf) is a German politician who served as a Member of the European Parliament from 1994 until 2014. She is a member of the Social Democratic Party of Germany, part of the Socialist Group.

Weiler joined the SPD in 1970.

During her term in office, Weiler served on the European Parliament's Committee on Internal Market and Consumer Protection. In this capacity, she was the Parliament's rapporteur on the Late Payment Directive (2010-2011) and the Radio Equipment Directive (2013-2014).

In addition to her committee assignments, Weiler was a substitute for the Committee on Employment and Social Affairs, a member of the delegation for relations with the countries of Southeast Asia and the Association of Southeast Asian Nations (ASEAN) and a substitute for the Delegation for relations with Japan. She was also part of a monitoring mission during the Ukrainian presidential election in 2014.

== Education ==
- 1963: School-leaving certificate
- Studied languages in the UK 1965-1967

== Career ==
- 1963-1965: Night school
- 1965-1985: Office worker (clerk, head secretary, company secretary) in industry
- SPD organiser, Fulda District (1985-1987);
- 1971-1975: Councillor in Willich, Viersen District
- 1975-1985: Willich town councillor
- 1987-1994: Member of the Bundestag
- 1994-2014: Member of the European Parliament
