= Christa Lörcher =

German politician

- Born: Christa Gisela Treumann; 24 June 1941 (age 85); Mewe, German Reich
- Education: University of Tübingen
- Occupation: Member of the German Parliament
- Political party: SPD
- Awards: Order of Merit of the Federal Republic of Germany; Clara Immerwahr Award
- Website: christaloercher.de/gruss.html

Christa Gisela Lörcher (née Treumann, 24 June 1941, in Mewe) is a former German politician. She was a member of the Bundestag from 1993 to 2002.

== Life ==
Lörcher was born in Mewe, Reichsgau Danzig-West Prussia, Nazi Germany. (Note: Presently Gniew, Pomeranian Voivodeship, Third Polish Republic) She graduated from high school in 1959 and studied at the University of Tübingen and at the Esslingen University of Education, graduating as a primary and secondary school teacher. She then became a secondary school teacher for mathematics and physics. She received a scholarship from the Volkswagenwerk Foundation for mathematics projects in England, the US and Sweden. She then completed practical vocational training as a geriatric nurse.

Lörcher worked as a math and physics teacher in various types of schools and collaborated on the Kahle/Lörcher mathematics work for secondary schools. She worked as a geriatric nurse in retirement and nursing homes and in geriatric psychiatry. From 1988, she was a teaching nurse for geriatric and nursing care.

Lörcher was initially a member of the GEW, then the ÖTV union. She worked for the Kinderschutzbund, Arbeiterwohlfahrt and Friends of Nature. Lörcher received the Federal Cross of Merit on ribbon in 2022.

== Politics ==
In 1970, Lörcher joined the Social Democratic Party of Germany (SPD) and became deputy district chairwoman. From 1989, she was a member of the district council and deputy parliamentary group leader. She was a member of the Bundestag from September 3, 1993, until the end of the 14th legislative period in 2002, where she was elected via the state list. She also ran for the direct mandate in the Bundestag constituency Schwarzwald-Baar. In November 2001, Lörcher became known nationwide when she refused to vote for Chancellor Schröder in the vote of confidence, as the vote on a military deployment (war in Afghanistan) was tied to this. Prior to this, she resigned from the SPD parliamentary group and was a member of the Bundestag for the remainder of the legislative period as a non-attached Member of Parliament. Lörcher was honored in 2002 with the Clara Immerwahr Award, the Peace Prize of the International Physicians for the Prevention of Nuclear War (IPPNW).
