= Ralf Walter =

German politician of the Social Democratic Party of Germany (born 1958)

Ralf Walter (born 15 March 1958, in Andernach) is a German politician of the Social Democratic Party of Germany who served as a Member of the European Parliament from 1994 until 2009. In Parliament, he served as vice-chair of the Committee on Budgets. He was also a substitute for the Committee on Budgetary Control and the Committee on Development.

== Education ==
- Graduated in social work

== Career ==
- 1980–1990: Chairman of the Cochem SPD
- 1988–2000: Chairman of the Cochem-Zell Subdistrict SPD
- Member of the SPD District Executive
- since 2003: Chairman of the Rheinland-Pfalz SPD Party Council
- 1979–1996: Member of the Cochem Municipal Council
- 1984–2000: District Councillor
- 1991–1994: Member of the Bundestag
- 1994–2009: Member of the European Parliament

== Decorations ==
- Bundesverdienstkreuz
