= Ilse Falk =

German politician (1943–2024)

Member of the Bundestag
- In office 1990–2009

Personal details
- Born: 21 September 1943 Bevensen, Gau Eastern Hanover, Germany
- Died: 23 February 2024 (aged 80)
- Party: CDU

Ilse Falk (21 September 1943 – 23 February 2024) was a German politician of the Christian Democratic Union (CDU) and former member of the German Bundestag.

== Life and career ==
Falk joined the CDU in 1984 and was chairwoman of the Wesel district association of the Women's Union from 1989. She was a member of the German Bundestag from 1990 to 2009, From 2001 to 2009 she was also a member of the CDU federal executive committee. From 1990 to 2009 she was a member of the German Bundestag. From 2001 to 2005 she was Parliamentary Secretary of the CDU/CSU parliamentary group and from 2005 to 2009 Deputy Chairperson of the CDU/CSU parliamentary group for the areas of family, senior citizens, women and youth; labour and social affairs; churches; employees.

Falk died on 23 February 2024, at the age of 80.
