= Hans H. Gattermann =

German politician

Member of the Bundestag
- In office 14 December 1976 – 27 January 1994

Personal details
- Born: 24 December 1931 Dortmund
- Died: 27 January 1994 (aged 62)
- Party: FDP

Hans H. Gattermann (24 December 1931 – 27 January 1994) was a German politician of the Free Democratic Party (FDP) and former member of the German Bundestag.

== Life ==
In the 1976 Bundestag elections he was elected to the German Bundestag via the North Rhine-Westphalia state list, of which he was a member until his death. Here he had been chairman of the Finance Committee since 1983.

== Literature ==
Herbst, Ludolf; Jahn, Bruno (2002). Vierhaus, Rudolf (ed.). Biographisches Handbuch der Mitglieder des Deutschen Bundestages. 1949–2002 [Biographical Handbook of the Members of the German Bundestag. 1949–2002] (in German). München: De Gruyter - De Gruyter Saur. p. 1715. ISBN 978-3-11-184511-1.
