= Thea Bock =

German politician (1938–2025)

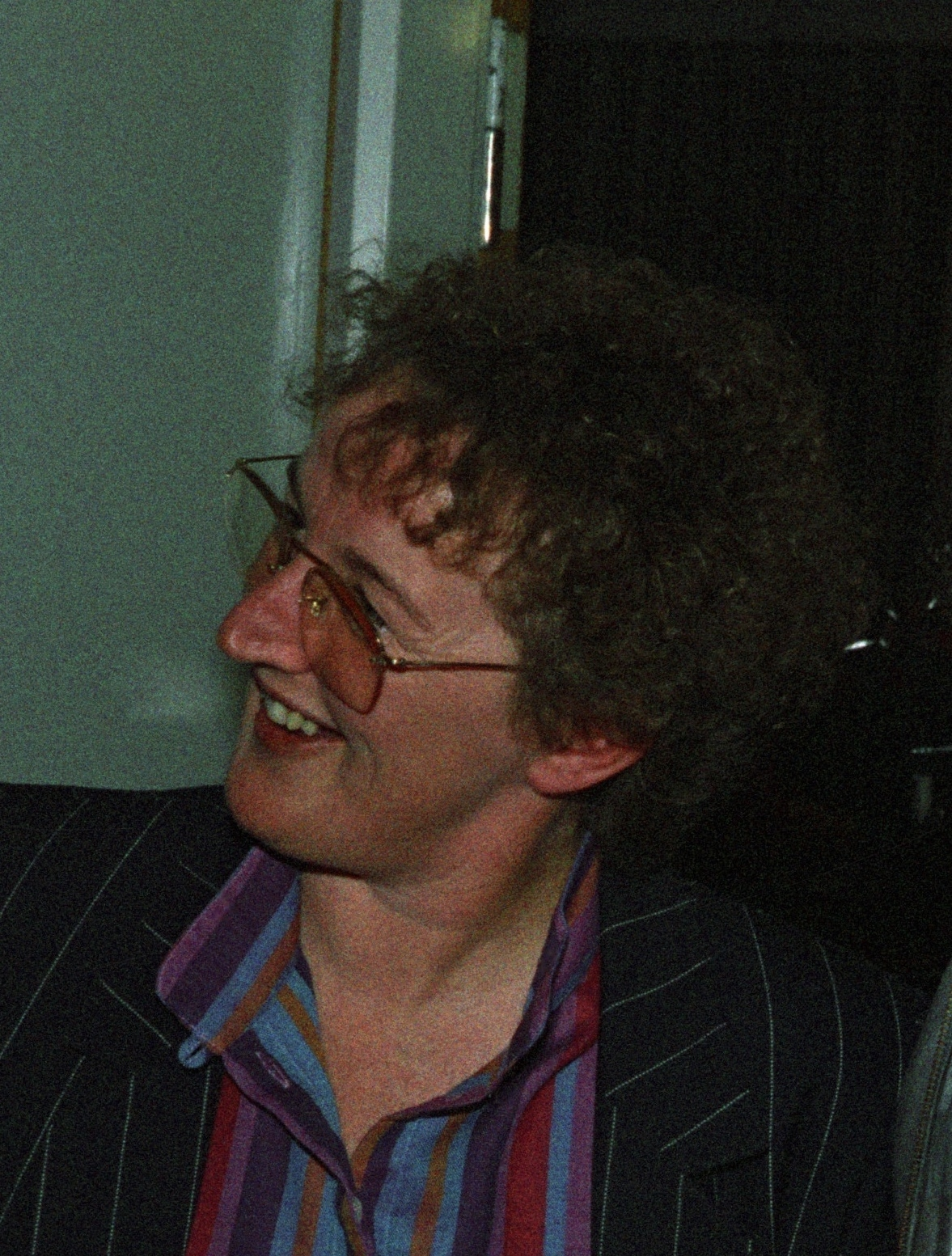
- Bock circa 2013

Member of the Bundestag
- In office 4 July 1991 – 10 November 1994
- Preceded by: Peter Zumkley

Member of the Hamburg Parliament
- In office 1986–1988
- In office 1982–1984

Personal details
- Born: Thea Burmester; 6 May 1938 Hamburg, Germany
- Died: 4 February 2025 (aged 86)
- Party: GAL (1982–1988); SPD (1988–2025)
- Occupation: Teacher

Thea Bock (née Burmester; 6 May 1938 – 4 February 2025) was a German politician. A member of the Green-Alternative List and subsequently the Social Democratic Party, she served in the Hamburg Parliament from 1982 to 1984 and again from 1986 to 1988 before serving in the Bundestag from 1991 to 1994.

Bock died on 4 February 2025, at the age of 86.
