= Bertram Wieczorek =

German physician and politician

- Born: 16 January 1951 (age 75); East Berlin, East Germany
- Occupations: Physician, politician
- Political party: CDU (East Germany); New Forum; CDU (West Germany)
- Spouse: Married
- Children: 2

Bertram Wieczorek (born 16 January 1951) is a German physician and former politician (CDU).

He served as parliamentary undersecretary in the East German Ministry for Defence and Arms Procurement between March and October 1990. After navigating the political upheavals of 1990 he served between 1991 and 1994 as parliamentary undersecretary in the German Ministry for the Environment, Nature Conservation, Building and Nuclear Safety. His subsequent career in charge of the Berlin Water Company between 1994 and 1999 was not without controversy.

== Life ==
Bertram Wieczorek was born into a Catholic family East Berlin. His father was a physician: his mother an opera singer. He passed his school final exams (Abitur) and qualified for work as a chef in 1969 before he moved on to undertake his military service with medical corps of the National People's Army ("Nationale Volksarmee" / NVA) between 1969 and 1972. After that, in 1972, he enrolled as a medical student.

In 1973 he joined a political party. Ambitious young East Germans generally joined the ruling Socialist Unity Party ("Sozialistische Einheitspartei Deutschlands" / SED), but Bertram Wieczorek joined the Christian Democratic Union (CDU). The East German CDU by this point had little in common with its West German counterpart. The CDU in the east was one of ten bloc parties and mass movements controlled by the SED through a structure known as the National Front. Apart from the SED no political party ever scored significantly in any general election between 1949 and 1989, but they nevertheless received seats in the national legislature (Volkskammer), according to a predetermined fixed quota. Under the highly centralised Leninist political structure that the country had copied from the Soviet Union, this was seen by the authorities as a way to make the system more broadly based. Within the CDU, between 1973 and September 1989, sources identify Wieczorek as a "local party official" ("CDU-Ortsfunktionär").

Wieczorek emerged with his degree in medicine in 1978. He completed his professional practical training and then worked as a physician in a succession of medical practices, specialising in various "in-patient" procedures. In 1987 he was appointed Medical Director at the Regional Rehabilitation Centre in Auerbach, a small industrial in the far south of the country between Zwickau and the border with Czechoslovakia.

In September 1989 he resigned from the CDU and became a founder, in Auerbach, of a local branch of New Forum. New Forum was a political party like no other. It emerged from various underground opposition groups. It was declared illegal by the authorities on 21 September 1989, but with the winds of Glasnost blowing across from – of all places – Moscow, the East German government was undergoing a crisis of confidence. In shared export markets the Soviet Union and East Germany were increasingly coming across one another as commercial rivals, while on a personal level there were rumours that the personal chemistry between comrades Gorbachev and Honecker was terrible: it was no longer possible to rely on comradely Warsaw Pact tanks to intervene in order to put down street protests as they had in 1953 or (in Prague), in 1968. New Forum was not crushed: after the Berlin Wall was breached by street protesters in November 1989 as Soviet forces looked on but did nothing to intervene, a momentum towards a more democratic future for East Germany gained traction. Bertram Wieczorek himself resigned from New Forum at the end of the year and in January 1990 returned to the CDU. However, during 1990 the CDU in East Germany systematically transformed its relationship to the old East German political establishment, even though western commentators (and others) sometimes struggled to keep up with the significance of what was going on.

The East German general election of March 1990 has been described as the first [and as matters turned out last] free and fair general election held in the German Democratic Republic. For the first time, East German voters were given more than one list of candidates from which to make their selection. (In previous elections the choice had been between voting for the official candidate list and voting against the list by using a separate ballot box located in another part of the polling station: the SED candidate list had never failed to secure the backing of more than 99% of eligible voters voting.) The fourteen electoral districts corresponded to the fourteen administrative regions into which the country had been divided in 1952. The most populous of them was Electoral District 8, the mining region centred on Karl-Marx-Stadt (as Chemnitz was known at that time) and also including Zwickau. Electoral District 8 returned 43 of the 400 members elected to the national legislature/parliament ("Volkskammer"). In a result which, startlingly, reflected the national trend, 19 of those 43 seats went to candidates on the CDU list. One of those was Bertram Wieczorek. He sat as a member of the Volkskammer from now till the reconfiguration that in October 1990 accompanied German reunification. In the chamber he served as deputy chair of the CDU/DA group. He was also appointed to a junior post in the de Maizière government as parliamentary undersecretary in the Ministry for Defence and Arms Procurement.

On 3 October 1990, as part of the reunification process, 144 of the 400 former members of the East German Volkskammer transferred to the Bundestag (parliament) of a united Germany, including 71 from the East German CDU, which now merged back into the (western) CDU from which it had been forcibly separated following the creation of the stand-alone German Democratic Republic back in October 1949. Bertram Wieczorek was one of those members who now made the switch. A new general election was held at the end of the year. Wieczorek successfully stood for election as the CDU candidate in the Vogtland electoral district (District 328)) where he topped the poll, securing almost 50% of the votes cast even in the first round of the election. In the new parliament he again served, between 1990 and 1994, as a deputy chair of the CDU/CSU group. In addition he accepted a junior post in Dr. Kohl's new government, appointed parliamentary undersecretary in the German Ministry for the Environment, Nature Conservation, Building and Nuclear Safety.

On 31 January 1994 Wieczorek resigned his ministerial post and his membership of the Bundestag where his seat was taken over by Christa Schmidt for the two months remaining till the next general election. He now moved to an important position as chairman of the board at the Berlin Water Company. This proved something of a poisoned chalice. During the 1980s water consumers in West Berlin had paid some of the lowest tariffs in the Federal Republic, but in 1994 a new legal structure was created for the company supplying water across the entire reunified city of Berlin. By 1997, not quite three years into Wieczorek's time at the top, citizens in what had been West Berlin had experienced a 100% increase in their water prices since reunification while for citizens of what had been East Berlin there had been a twentyfold increase over the same period, up to 8.30 Marks per cubic meter. Although commentators acknowledged the need to modernise, it was striking that much of the additional revenue flowing into the Berlin Water Company was "invested" in a spending spree that involved the purchase loss-making water companies in other parts of Germany. As Klaus Wowereit, a critical observer and an SPD politician (who would later become Governing Mayor of Berlin), saw the matter: "It makes no sense to purchase a mixed-good emporium from firms that no one else wants".

In 1999 Bertram Wieczorek left the water company and returned to his earlier vocation, establishing himself in Rodewisch as a self-employed physician.

== Personal ==
Bertram Wieczorek is married and has two children. Although one source states that he was born into a Catholic family, a parliamentary source describes him as "konfessionslos", implying that he has subsequently opted out of church membership and the supplementary tax obligations that in Germany accompany it.
