= Angela Stachowa =

German Sorbian writer and politician (1948–2022)

Angela Stachowa (née Měrćink; 16 August 1948 — 29 March 2022) was a German Sorbian writer and politician.

== Biography ==
Stachowa was born in Prague on 16 August 1948, the daughter of the Sorbian writer Jurij Měrćink. After graduating from Sorbische Oberschule in Bautzen in 1967, she studied at TU Dresden, graduating in 1972 with a degree in engineering economics, specializing in electrical engineering/electronics. From 1973 to 1976, she was a research assistant at Karl-Marx-Universität Leipzig. She then worked as a freelance writer. For her work she received the Domowina art prize, the Art Prize of the City of Leipzig (1986) and the OIRT radio play prize, as well as the Johann Gottfried Herder Medal in gold. Some of her works have been translated into Czech, Polish, Russian, Swedish, Croatian and English.

Stachowa was a member of the SED from 1972 to 1989. From 20 December 1990 to 10 November 1994, she was a member of the German Bundestag for one term. She was elected to parliament as a non-party member for the PDS/Left List via the Land list Saxony into parliament. During the legislative period, she resigned from the PDS parliamentary group on 15 June 1994, but retained her mandate as a non-party member.

Stachowa lived in Leipzig. She died there on 29 March 2022 at the age of 73.

== Awards ==
- Art Prize of the Domowina
- Johann-Gottfried-Herder-Medal in gold

== Works (selection) ==
- Stunde zwischen Hund & Katz. Mitteldeutscher Verlag, Halle 1975.
- Geschichten für Majka. Mitteldeutscher Verlag, Halle 1978.
  - Excerpt in: Horst Heidtmann (ed.): Die Verbesserung des Menschen. Fairy Tales. Contributions by Franz Fühmann and others, Luchterhand Literaturverlag, Darmstadt 1982, ISBN 3-472-61413-7, pp. 123–137.
- Annalinde und das Feuermännchen. VEB Domowina-Verlag, Bautzen 1981.
- Kleine Verführung. Mitteldeutscher Verlag, Halle 1982, ISBN 3-354-00402-9.
- Acht Tage Abschied. Postreiter, Halle 1987.
- Słónčna róža Marhata. Ludowe nakładnistwo Domowina (LND), Budyšin 1996.
- Lilow a knjez Handrik. LND, Budyšin 1997.
- Jank ze žołtym kłobukom. LND, Budyšin 2000.
- Vineta. LND, Budyšin 2002.
- Stories from the GDR. Autonomy and Chaos, Berlin 2023. ISBN 978-3-945980-89-7 PDF
