= Bernhard Worms =

German politician (1930–2024)

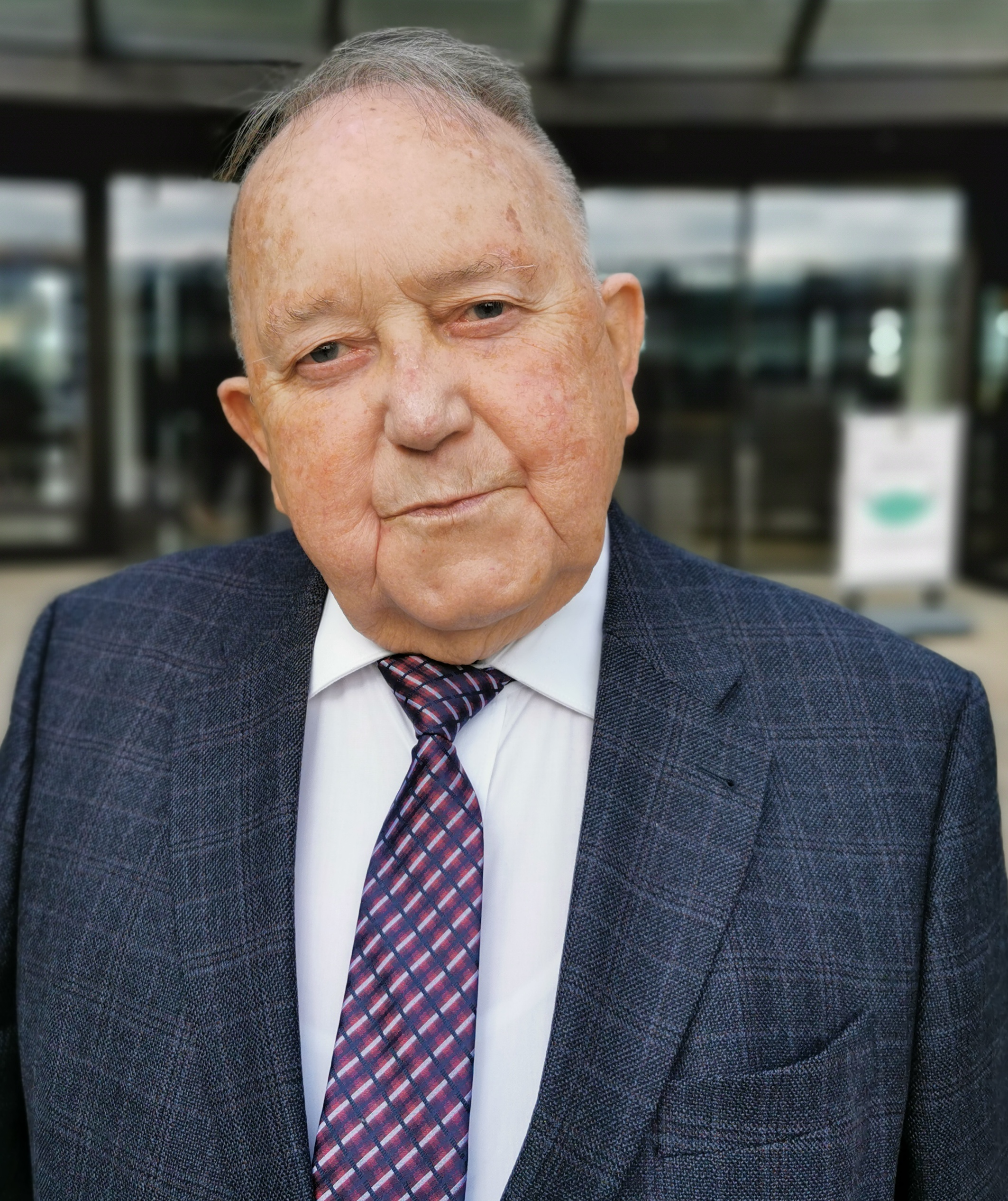
- Worms in 2021

Member of the Landtag of North Rhine-Westphalia
- In office 1970–1990

Member of the Bundestag
- In office 1990

Personal details
- Born: 14 March 1930 Stommeln, Rhine Province, Prussia, Germany
- Died: 21 December 2024 (aged 94)
- Party: CDU

Bernhard Worms (14 March 1930 – 21 December 2024) was a German politician. A member of the Christian Democratic Union of Germany, he served in the Landtag of North Rhine-Westphalia from 1970 to 1990 and in the Bundestag in 1990.

Worms died on 21 December 2024, at the age of 94.
