= Hubert Hüppe =

German politician

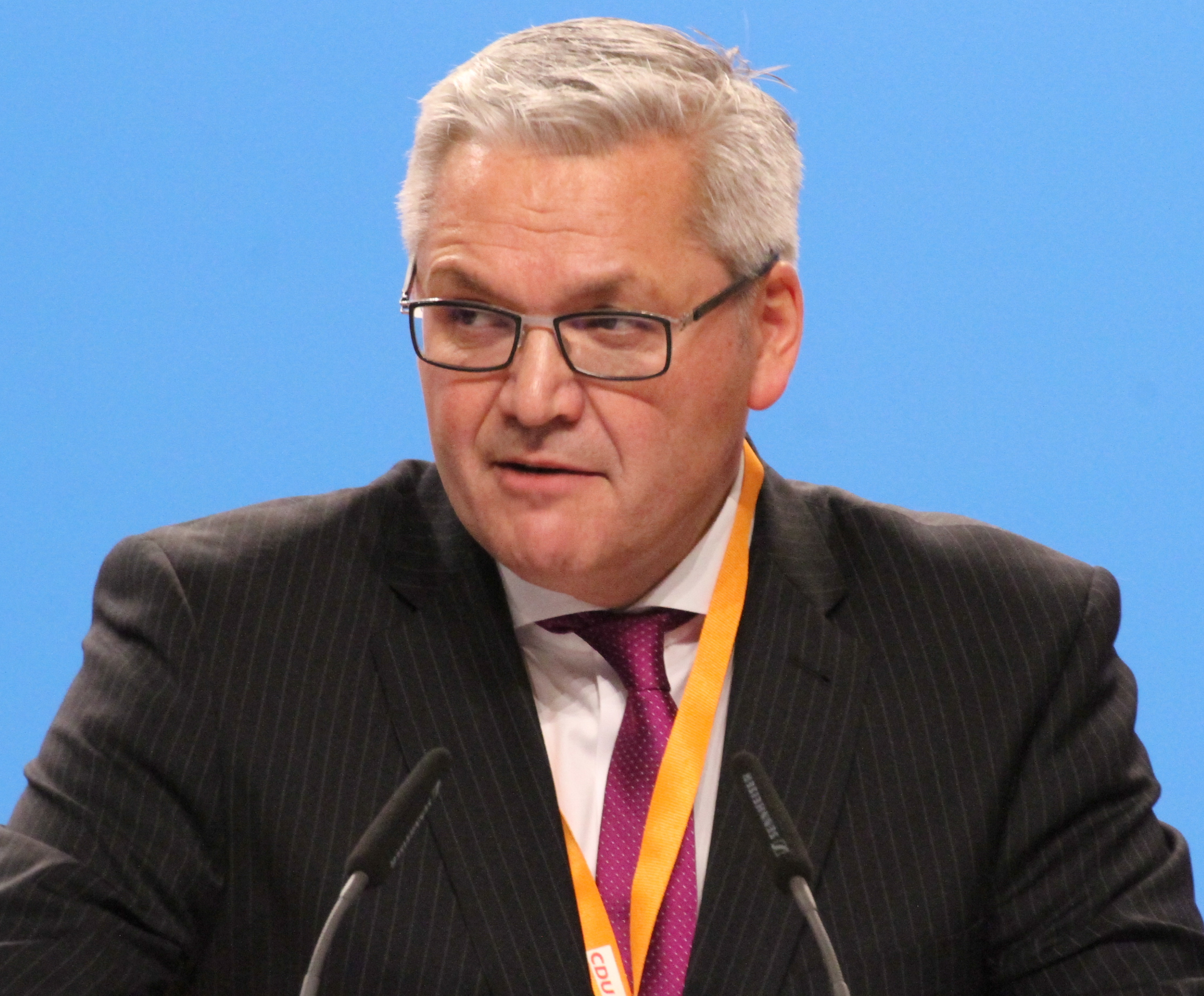

Member of the Bundestag
- Incumbent
- Assumed office 2021

Personal details
- Born: 3 November 1956 (age 69) Lünen
- Party: CDU

Hubert Hüppe (born 3 November 1956) is a German politician, and MP from the Christian Democratic Union. He was elected to the Bundestag in the 2021 German federal election after serving previous terms in the 1990s, 2000s and 2010s.

== Early life and career ==
After attending primary school in Lünen and the gymnasium in Werne, where he obtained his intermediate school certificate, he completed training at the Lünen city administration for the higher non-technical service, graduating as a Diplomverwaltungswirt (graduate in public administration). Until 1991, he worked as a city senior inspector in the Lünen city administration, particularly in the Youth and Social Affairs departments.

His political engagement began during his school years: in 1971, he joined the Student Union and the Young Union in the Unna district, where he served as district chairman and member of the state board. In 1974, he became a member of the CDU and joined the Christian Democratic Workers' Association in 1982. From 1988 to 2014, he was a member of the CDU district board in the Ruhr area and served as district chairman of the CDU Unna from 1989 to 2013. Additionally, he was a member of the federal board of the CDU Germany from 2010 to 2014. Since 2019, he has been the district chairman of the Seniors Union and continues to be actively involved in the political landscape.
