= Klaus Beckmann =

German politician (1944–1994)

Member of the Bundestag
- In office 4 November 1980 – 27 May 1994

Personal details
- Born: 11 August 1944 Ennigloh
- Died: 27 May 1994 (aged 49)
- Party: FDP

Klaus Beckmann (11 August 1944 – 27 May 1994) was a German politician of the Free Democratic Party (FDP) and former member of the German Bundestag.

== Life ==
From 1980 until his death Beckmann was a member of the German Bundestag. Here he was Parliamentary Secretary of the FDP parliamentary group from 1983 to 1989. In July 1989, Klaus Beckmann was appointed Parliamentary State Secretary to the Federal Minister of Economics. He resigned from this office in September 1992 due to serious illness. He left behind a wife and three daughters.

== Literature ==
Herbst, Ludolf; Jahn, Bruno (2002). Vierhaus, Rudolf (ed.). Biographisches Handbuch der Mitglieder des Deutschen Bundestages. 1949–2002 [Biographical Handbook of the Members of the German Bundestag. 1949–2002] (in German). München: De Gruyter - De Gruyter Saur. p. 1715. ISBN 978-3-11-184511-1.
