= Günter Marten =

German politician of the Christian Democratic Union (CDU)

Member of the Bundestag; for Güstrow – Sternberg – Lübz – Parchim – Ludwigslust
- In office 20 November 1990 – 26 October 1998
- Preceded by: Constituency established
- Succeeded by: Christel Deichmann

Personal details
- Born: 10 March 1939 Diepholz, Germany
- Died: 12 January 2013 (aged 73)
- Party: Christian Democratic Union
- Children: 2
- Profession: Technical draftsman, Metalworker, Economic development consultant

Günter Marten (10 March 1939 – 12 January 2013) was a German politician of the Christian Democratic Union (CDU). He was a member of the German Bundestag from 1990 to 1998.

== Early career ==
After obtaining his Mittlere Reife (secondary school certificate), Günter Marten trained as a technical draftsman and metalworker. In 1960, he joined the German Navy as an officer cadet, eventually rising to the rank of frigate captain.

== Political career ==
Günter Marten joined the CDU and the Christian Democratic Employees' Association (CDA) in 1974. After German reunification, he became involved in the CDU Mecklenburg-Vorpommern, serving as its treasurer from 1991 to 1992.

In the 1990 and 1994 elections, Günter Marten ran as the CDU direct candidate in the Güstrow – Sternberg – Lübz – Parchim – Ludwigslust constituency. He was a member of the Parliamentary Assembly of the Council of Europe and the Assembly of the Western European Union. In the nomination process for the 1998 German federal election, he defeated former Minister Georg Diederich, but lost in the election to SPD candidate Christel Deichmann and subsequently left the Bundestag.

== Personal life ==
Günter Marten was Protestant, married, and had two children. From 1994, he served as the honorary consul of Hungary in Schwerin. He worked as an independent economic development consultant.

== Literature ==
- Rudolf Vierhaus, Ludolf Herbst (eds.), Bruno Jahn (contributor): Biographical Handbook of Members of the German Bundestag. 1949–2002. Vol. 1: A–M. K. G. Saur, Munich 2002, ISBN 3-598-23782-0.
