= Manfred Schell =

German trade unionist and politician

Manfred Schell (born 12 February 1943 in Aachen) is a German trade unionist. Before he retired in 2008, he was the leader of Gewerkschaft Deutscher Lokomotivführer (German locomotive engineers union).

He is a member of the German Christian Democratic Union.
