= Fourth Adenauer cabinet =

West German government from 1961 to 1963

Fourth Cabinet of Konrad Adenauer Cabinet Adenauer IV
- 4th Cabinet of West Germany
- 14 November 1961 – 15 October 1963 (until 17 October 1963 as caretaker government)
- Date formed: 14 November 1961
- Date dissolved: 15 October 1963 (1 year, 11 months and 1 day)

People and organisations
- President: Heinrich Lübke
- Chancellor: Konrad Adenauer
- Vice-Chancellor: Ludwig Erhard
- Member parties: Christian Democratic Union; Christian Social Union; Free Democratic Party
- Status in legislature: Coalition majority
- Opposition party: Social Democratic Party
- Opposition leader: Erich Ollenhauer (SPD)

History
- Election: 1961 West German federal election
- Legislature term: 4th Bundestag
- Predecessor: Adenauer III
- Successor: Erhard I

The Fourth Adenauer cabinet (German: Kabinett Adenauer IV) was formed by incumbent Chancellor Konrad Adenauer after the 1961 federal election. The cabinet was sworn in on 14 November 1961.

The Spiegel affair in 1962 caused the coalition to fall apart over Defence Minister Franz Josef Strauss' actions which violated press freedom, leading to all FDP ministers resigning in protest. As a result, the cabinet was a minority government of the CDU/CSU for just under a month in the fall of 1962 before Adenauer was able to convince the FDP to return to the coalition by assuring Strauß' resignation.

== Composition ==
Shortly after the Spiegel affair, the resignation of Defence Minister Franz Josef Strauss was required to gain back the FDP's support for the cabinet, leading to a reshuffle. The heavily reshuffled cabinet is sometimes referred to as cabinet Adenauer V; however, this is not constitutionally correct, since no new election of the chancellor took place. The government still drew its constitutional legitimacy from Adenauer's election on 14 November 1961. Adenauer decided to retire just a few months later, following which Ludwig Erhard was elected as Chancellor and formed the first Erhard cabinet on 17 October 1963.

Portfolio	Minister	Took office	Left office	Party
Chancellor	Konrad Adenauer	14 November 1961	15 October 1963	CDU
Vice-Chancellor & Federal Minister for Economy	Ludwig Erhard	14 November 1961	15 October 1963	CDU
Federal Minister for Foreign Affairs	Gerhard Schröder	14 November 1961	15 October 1963	CDU
Federal Minister of the Interior	Hermann Höcherl	14 November 1961	15 October 1963	CSU
Federal Minister of Justice	Wolfgang Stammberger	14 November 1961	19 November 1962	FDP
Federal Minister of Justice	Ewald Bucher	14 December 1962	15 October 1963	FDP
Federal Minister of Finance	Heinz Starke	14 November 1961	19 November 1962	FDP
Federal Minister of Finance	Rolf Dahlgrün	14 December 1962	15 October 1963	FDP
Federal Minister for Food, Agriculture and Forests	Werner Schwarz	14 November 1961	15 October 1963	CDU
Federal Minister for Labour and Social Affairs	Theodor Blank	14 November 1961	15 October 1963	CDU
Federal Minister of Defence	Franz Josef Strauss	14 November 1961	16 December 1962 (de facto); 9 January 1963 (de jure)	CSU
Federal Minister of Defence	Kai-Uwe von Hassel	9 January 1963	15 October 1963	CDU
Federal Minister of Transport	Hans-Christoph Seebohm	14 November 1961	15 October 1963	CDU
Federal Minister of Post and Telecommunications	Richard Stücklen	14 November 1961	15 October 1963	CSU
Federal Minister of Housing Construction	Paul Lücke	14 November 1961	15 October 1963	CDU
Federal Minister of Displaced Persons, Refugees and War Victims	Wolfgang Mischnick	14 November 1961	19 November 1962	FDP
Federal Minister of Displaced Persons, Refugees and War Victims	Wolfgang Mischnick	14 December 1962	15 October 1963	FDP
Federal Minister of All-German Affairs	Ernst Lemmer	14 November 1961	11 December 1962	CDU
Federal Minister of All-German Affairs	Rainer Barzel	14 December 1962	15 October 1963	CDU
Federal Ministry of Nuclear Energy	Siegfried Balke	14 November 1961	13 December 1962	CSU
Federal Ministry of Scientific Research	Hans Lenz	14 December 1962	15 October 1963	FDP
Federal Minister of Family and Youth Affairs	Franz-Josef Wuermeling	14 November 1961	11 December 1962	CDU
Federal Minister of Family and Youth Affairs	Bruno Heck	14 December 1962	15 October 1963	CDU
Federal Minister of Bundesrat and State Affairs	Hans-Joachim von Merkatz	14 November 1961	13 December 1962	CDU
Federal Minister of Bundesrat and State Affairs	Alois Niederalt	14 December 1962	15 October 1963	CSU
Federal Minister of the Treasury	Hans Lenz	14 November 1961	19 November 1962	FDP
Federal Minister of the Treasury	Werner Dollinger	14 December 1962	15 October 1963	CSU
Federal Minister for Economic Cooperation	Walter Scheel	14 November 1961	19 November 1962	FDP
Federal Minister for Economic Cooperation	Walter Scheel	14 December 1962	15 October 1963	FDP
Federal Minister of Health	Elisabeth Schwarzhaupt	14 November 1961	15 October 1963	CDU
Federal Minister for Special Affairs	Heinrich Krone	14 November 1961	15 October 1963	CDU
