= Second Erhard cabinet =

West German government from 1965 to 1966

Second Cabinet of Ludwig Erhard Cabinet Erhard II
- 6th Cabinet of the Federal Republic of Germany
- 1965–1966
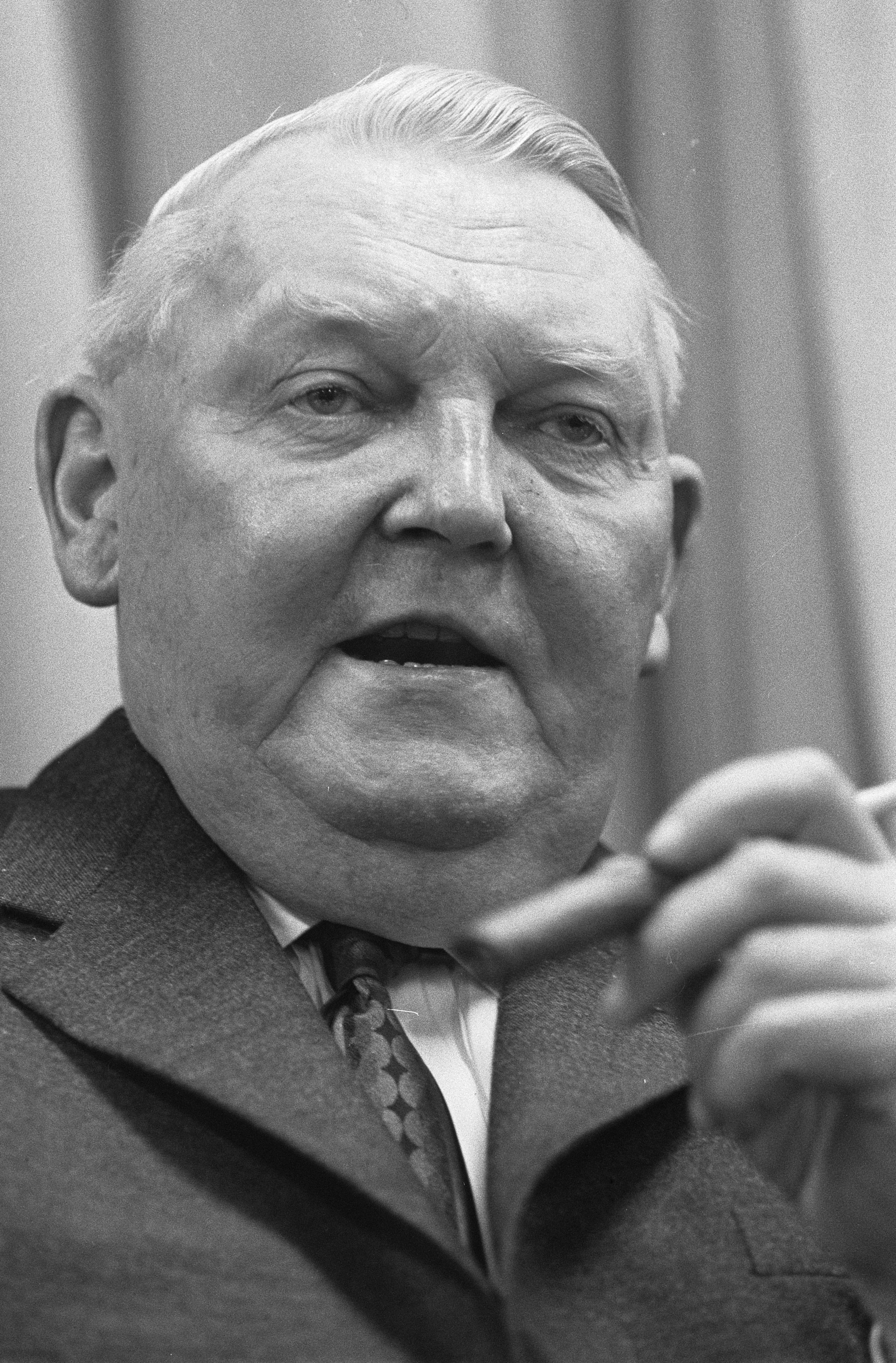
- Date formed: 26 October 1965
- Date dissolved: 30 November 1966 (1 year, 1 month and 4 days)

People and organisations
- President: Heinrich Lübke
- Chancellor: Ludwig Erhard
- Vice-Chancellor: Erich Mende (until 28 October 1966); Hans-Christoph Seebohm (from 28 October 1966)
- Member party: Christian Democratic Union; Christian Social Union; Free Democratic Party
- Status in legislature: Coalition government
- Opposition party: Social Democratic Party
- Opposition leader: Fritz Erler (SPD)

History
- Election: 1965 West German federal election
- Legislature terms: 5th Bundestag
- Predecessor: Erhard I
- Successor: Kiesinger

The Second Erhard cabinet was the government of West Germany between 26 October 1965 and 30 November 1966. Led by the Christian Democratic Union Ludwig Erhard, the cabinet was a coalition between the Christian Democratic Union (CDU) and the Free Democratic Party (FDP).

== Composition ==
Cabinet
Portfolio	Minister	Took office	Left office	Party
Chancellor	Ludwig Erhard	26 October 1965	30 November 1966	Independent
Vice-Chancellor	Erich Mende	26 October 1965	28 October 1966	FDP
Vice-Chancellor	Hans-Christoph Seebohm	28 October 1966	30 November 1966	CDU
Federal Minister of Transport	Hans-Christoph Seebohm	26 October 1965	30 November 1966	CDU
Federal Minister of Foreign Affairs	Gerhard Schröder	26 October 1965	30 November 1966	CDU
Federal Minister of Internal Affairs	Paul Lücke	26 October 1965	30 November 1966	CDU
Federal Minister of Justice	Richard Jaeger	26 October 1965	30 November 1966	CSU
Federal Minister of Finance	Rolf Dahlgrün	26 October 1965	28 October 1966	FDP
Federal Minister of Finance	Kurt Schmücker	28 October 1966	30 November 1966	CDU
Federal Minister of Economics	Kurt Schmücker	26 October 1965	30 November 1966	CDU
Federal Minister of Food, Agriculture and Forests	Hermann Höcherl	26 October 1965	30 November 1966	CSU
Federal Minister of Labour and Social Affairs	Hans Katzer	26 October 1965	30 November 1966	CDU
Federal Minister of Defence	Kai-Uwe von Hassel	26 October 1965	30 November 1966	CDU
Federal Minister of Post and Communication	Richard Stücklen	26 October 1965	30 November 1966	CSU
Federal Minister of Building and Urban Development	Ewald Bucher	26 October 1965	28 October 1966	FDP
Federal Minister of Building and Urban Development	Bruno Heck	28 October 1966	30 November 1966	CDU
Federal Minister of Family and Youth Affairs	Bruno Heck	26 October 1965	30 November 1966	CDU
Federal Minister of All-German Affairs	Erich Mende	26 October 1965	28 October 1966	FDP
Federal Minister of All-German Affairs	Johann Baptist Gradl	28 October 1966	30 November 1966	CDU
Federal Minister of Displaced Persons, Refugees and War Victims	Johann Baptist Gradl	26 October 1965	30 November 1966	CDU
Federal Minister of Scientific Research	Gerhard Stoltenberg	26 October 1965	30 November 1966	CDU
Federal Minister of Economic Cooperation	Walter Scheel	26 October 1965	28 October 1966	FDP
Federal Minister of Economic Cooperation	Werner Dollinger	28 October 1966	30 November 1966	CSU
Federal Minister of Treasury	Werner Dollinger	26 October 1965	30 November 1966	CSU
Federal Minister of Health Affairs	Elisabeth Schwarzhaupt	26 October 1965	30 November 1966	CDU
Federal Minister of the Affairs of the Federal Defence Council	Heinrich Krone	26 October 1965	30 November 1966	CDU
Federal Minister of the Affairs of the Federal Council and the States	Alois Niederalt	17 October 1963	26 October 1965	CSU
Federal Minister of Special Affairs & Head of the Chancellery	Ludger Westrick	26 October 1965	30 November 1966	CDU
