= First Erhard cabinet =

West German government from 1963 to 1965

First Cabinet of Ludwig Erhard Cabinet Erhard I
- 5th Cabinet of the Federal Republic of Germany
- 1963–1965
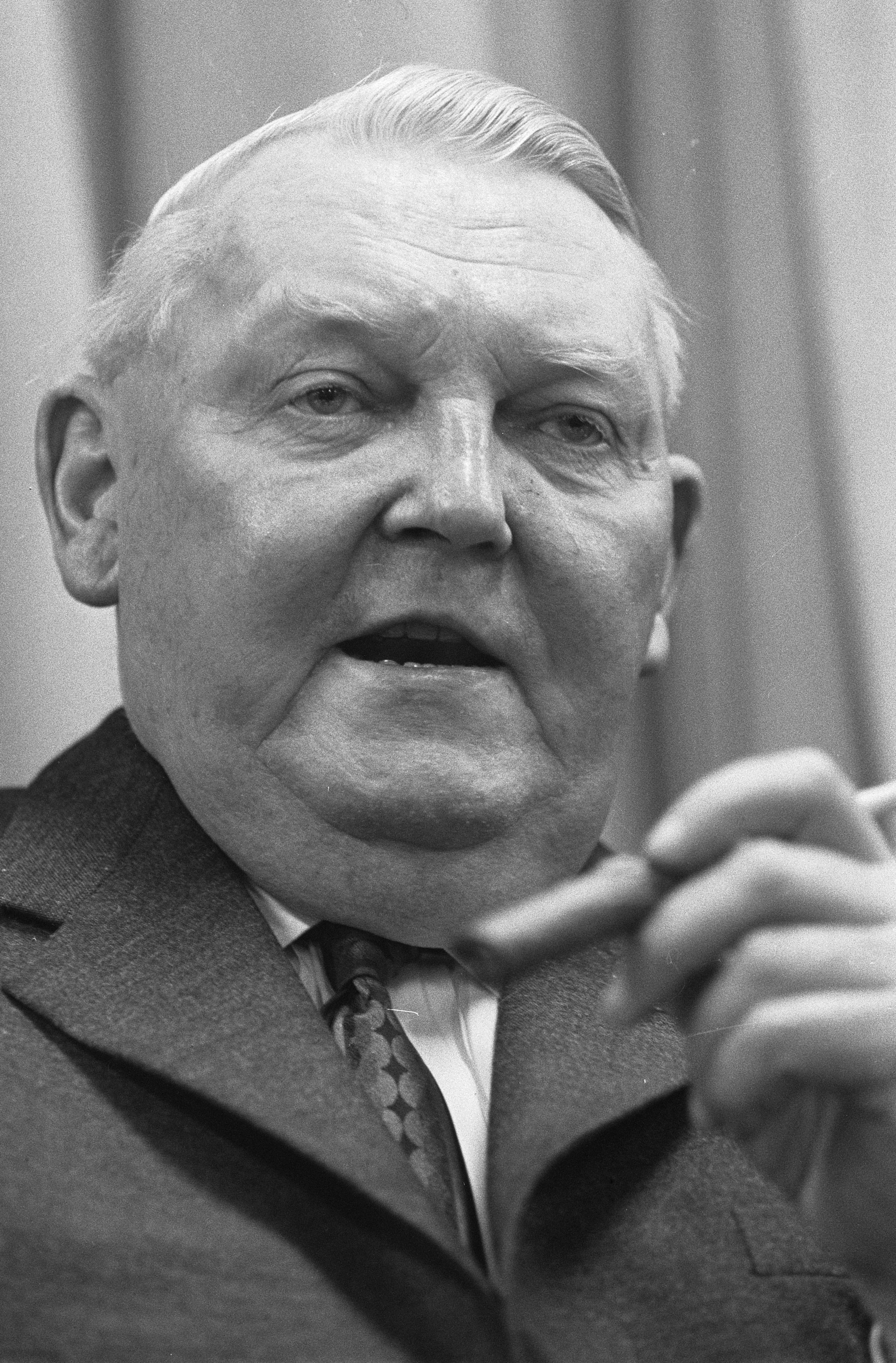
- Date formed: 17 October 1963
- Date dissolved: 26 October 1965 (2 years, 1 week and 2 days)

People and organisations
- President: Heinrich Lübke
- Chancellor: Ludwig Erhard
- Vice-Chancellor: Erich Mende
- Member party: Christian Democratic Union; Christian Social Union; Free Democratic Party
- Status in legislature: Coalition government
- Opposition party: Social Democratic Party
- Opposition leader: Erich Ollenhauer (until 14 December 1963); Fritz Erler (1964–1965)

History
- Election: None
- Legislature terms: 4th Bundestag
- Predecessor: Adenauer IV
- Successor: Erhard II

The First Erhard cabinet was the government of West Germany between 17 October 1963 and 26 October 1965. Led by the Christian Democratic Union Ludwig Erhard, the cabinet was a coalition between the Christian Democratic Union (CDU) and the Free Democratic Party (FDP). The Vice-Chancellor was the Free Democrat Erich Mende (FDP).

== Composition ==
Cabinet
| Portfolio | Minister | Took office | Left office | Party |
|---|---|---|---|---|
| Chancellor | Ludwig Erhard | 17 October 1963 | 26 October 1965 | CDU |
| Vice Chancellor & Federal Minister of All-German Affairs | Erich Mende | 17 October 1963 | 26 October 1965 | FDP |
| Federal Minister of Foreign Affairs | Gerhard Schröder | 17 October 1963 | 26 October 1965 | CDU |
| Federal Minister of Internal Affairs | Hermann Höcherl | 17 October 1963 | 26 October 1965 | CSU |
| Federal Minister of Justice | Ewald Bucher | 17 October 1963 | 27 March 1965 | FDP |
| Federal Minister of Justice | Karl Weber | 1 April 1965 | 26 October 1965 | CDU |
| Federal Minister of Finance | Rolf Dahlgrün | 17 October 1963 | 26 October 1965 | FDP |
| Federal Minister of Economics | Kurt Schmücker | 17 October 1963 | 26 October 1965 | CDU |
| Federal Minister of Food, Agriculture and Forests | Werner Schwarz | 17 October 1963 | 26 October 1965 | CDU |
| Federal Minister of Labour and Social Affairs | Theodor Blank | 17 October 1963 | 26 October 1965 | CDU |
| Federal Minister of Defence | Kai-Uwe von Hassel | 17 October 1963 | 26 October 1965 | CDU |
| Minister of Transport | Hans-Christoph Seebohm | 17 October 1963 | 26 October 1965 | CDU |
| Minister of Post and Communication | Richard Stücklen | 17 October 1963 | 26 October 1965 | CSU |
| Federal Minister of Housing, Construction and Urban Development | Paul Lücke | 17 October 1963 | 26 October 1965 | CDU |
| Federal Minister of Displaced Persons, Refugees and War Victims | Hans Krüger | 17 October 1963 | 11 February 1964 | CDU |
| Federal Minister of Displaced Persons, Refugees and War Victims | Ernst Lemmer | 19 February 1964 | 26 October 1965 | CDU |
| Federal Minister for Scientific Research | Hans Lenz | 17 October 1963 | 26 October 1965 | FDP |
| Federal Minister for Family and Youth Affairs | Bruno Heck | 17 October 1963 | 26 October 1965 | CDU |
| Federal Minister of Economic Cooperation | Walter Scheel | 17 October 1963 | 26 October 1965 | FDP |
| Federal Minister of Treasury | Werner Dollinger | 17 October 1963 | 26 October 1965 | CSU |
| Federal Minister of Health Affairs | Elisabeth Schwarzhaupt | 17 October 1963 | 26 October 1965 | CDU |
| Federal Minister of Special Affairs & Federal Minister of the Affairs of the Federal Defence Council (from 13 July 1964) | Heinrich Krone | 17 October 1963 | 26 October 1965 | CDU |
| Federal Minister of the Affairs of the Federal Council and the States | Alois Niederalt | 17 October 1963 | 26 October 1965 | CSU |
| Federal Minister of Special Affairs & Head of the Chancellery | Ludger Westrick | 16 June 1964 | 26 October 1965 | CDU |
