= Third Adenauer cabinet =

West German government from 1957 to 1961

Third Cabinet of Konrad Adenauer Cabinet Adenauer III
- 3rd Cabinet of the Federal Republic of Germany
- 29 October 1957 – 17 October 1961 (until 14 November 1961 as caretaker government)
- Date formed: 29 October 1957
- Date dissolved: 17 October 1961 (3 years, 11 months, 2 weeks and 4 days)

People and organisations
- President: Theodor Heuss
- Chancellor: Konrad Adenauer
- Vice-Chancellor: Ludwig Erhard
- Member parties: Christian Democratic Union; Christian Social Union; German Party (DP) (until 1960)
- Status in legislature: Coalition majority
- Opposition party: Social Democratic Party; Free Democratic Party
- Opposition leader: Erich Ollenhauer (SPD)

History
- Election: 1957 West German federal election
- Legislature term: 3rd Bundestag
- Predecessor: Adenauer II
- Successor: Adenauer IV

The Third Adenauer cabinet was formed by incumbent Chancellor Konrad Adenauer after the 1957 federal election. The cabinet was sworn in on 29 October 1957, and remained until it was succeeded by the fourth Adenauer cabinet on 17 October 1961.

== Composition ==
Portfolio	Minister	Took office	Left office	Party
Chancellor	Konrad Adenauer	15 September 1949	11 October 1963	CDU
Vice-Chancellor & Federal Minister of Economy	Ludwig Erhard	29 October 1957	15 October 1963	CDU
Federal Minister of Foreign Affairs	Heinrich von Brentano	6 June 1955	30 October 1961	CDU
Federal Minister of the Interior	Gerhard Schröder	20 October 1953	13 November 1961	CDU
Federal Minister of Justice	Fritz Schäffer	29 October 1957	14 November 1961	CSU
Federal Minister of Finance	Franz Etzel	29 October 1957	14 November 1961	CDU
Federal Minister of Food, Agriculture and Forests	Heinrich Lübke	20 October 1953	15 September 1959	CDU
Federal Minister of Food, Agriculture and Forests	Werner Schwarz	15 September 1959	26 October 1965	CDU
Federal Minister of Labour and Social Affairs	Theodor Blank	29 October 1957	26 October 1965	CDU
Federal Minister of Defence	Franz Josef Strauss	16 October 1956	16 December 1962	CSU
Federal Minister of Transport	Hans-Christoph Seebohm	20 September 1949	30 November 1966	DP
Federal Minister of Post and Telecommunications	Richard Stücklen	29 October 1957	1 December 1966	CSU
Federal Minister of Housing Construction	Paul Lücke	29 October 1957	26 October 1965	CDU
Federal Minister of Displaced Persons, Refugees and War Victims	Theodor Oberländer	20 October 1953	4 May 1960	CDU
Federal Minister of Displaced Persons, Refugees and War Victims	Hans-Joachim von Merkatz	4 May 1960	14 November 1961	CDU
Federal Minister of All-German Affairs	Ernst Lemmer	29 October 1957	11 December 1962	CDU
Federal Ministry of Nuclear Energy and Water Policy	Siegfried Balke	16 October 1956	13 December 1962	CSU
Federal Minister of Family and Youth Affairs	Franz-Josef Wuermeling	20 October 1953	11 December 1962	CDU
Federal Minister of Bundesrat and State Affairs	Hans-Joachim von Merkatz	26 May 1955	13 December 1962	DP
Federal Minister of Federal Patrimony	Hermann Lindrath	29 October 1957	27 February 1960 (†)	CDU
Federal Minister of Federal Patrimony	Hans Wilhelmi	4 May 1960	14 November 1961	CDU

== References and notes ==
- "Kabinette Adenauer". election.de (in German).
