= 1961 West German federal election =

- 17 September 1961

All 499 seats in the Bundestag (Note: As well as the 22 non-voting delegates for West Berlin, elected by the West Berlin Legislature.) 250 seats needed for a majority
- Registered: 37,440,715 (▲5.8%)
- Turnout: 87.7% (▼0.1pp)
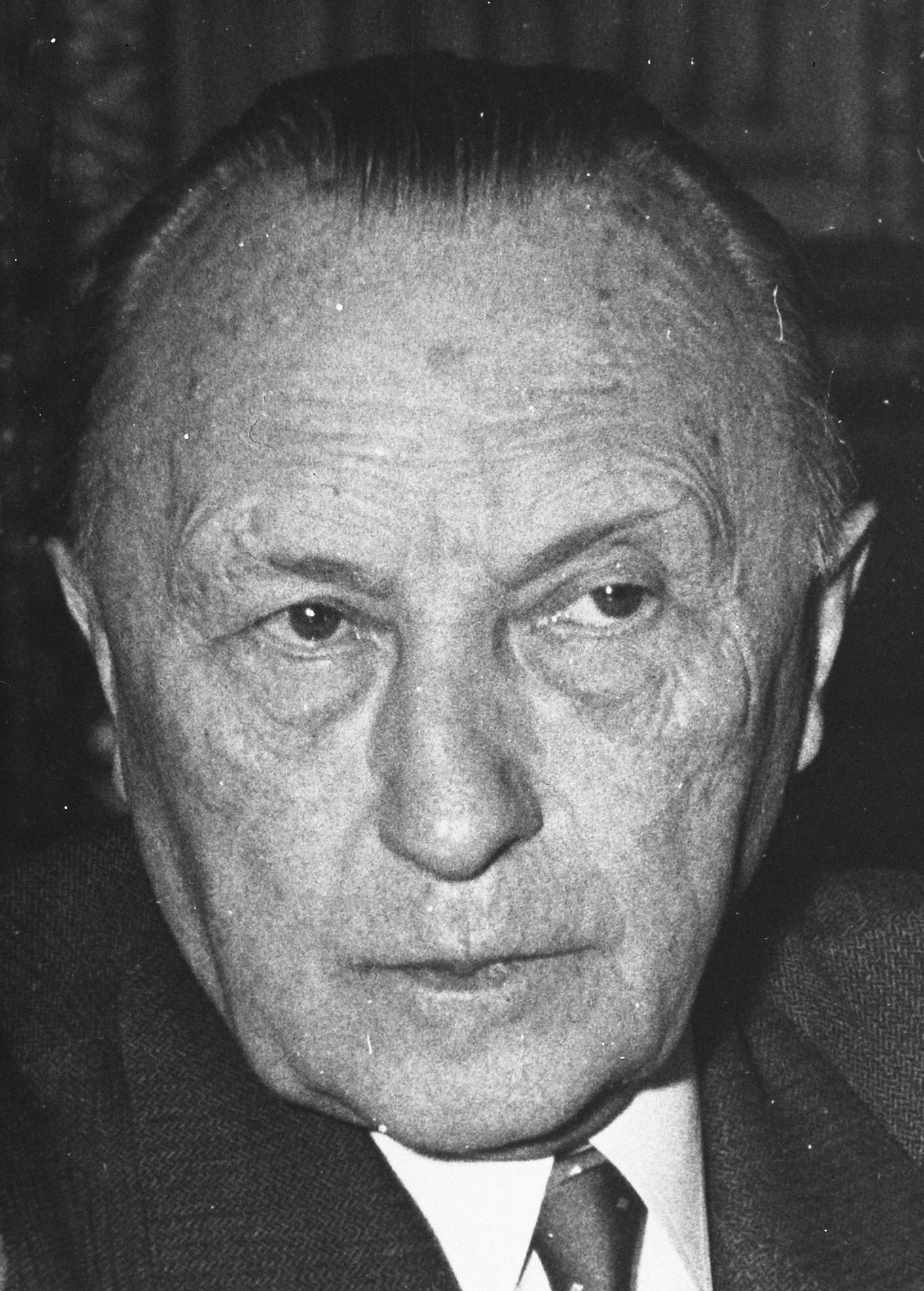

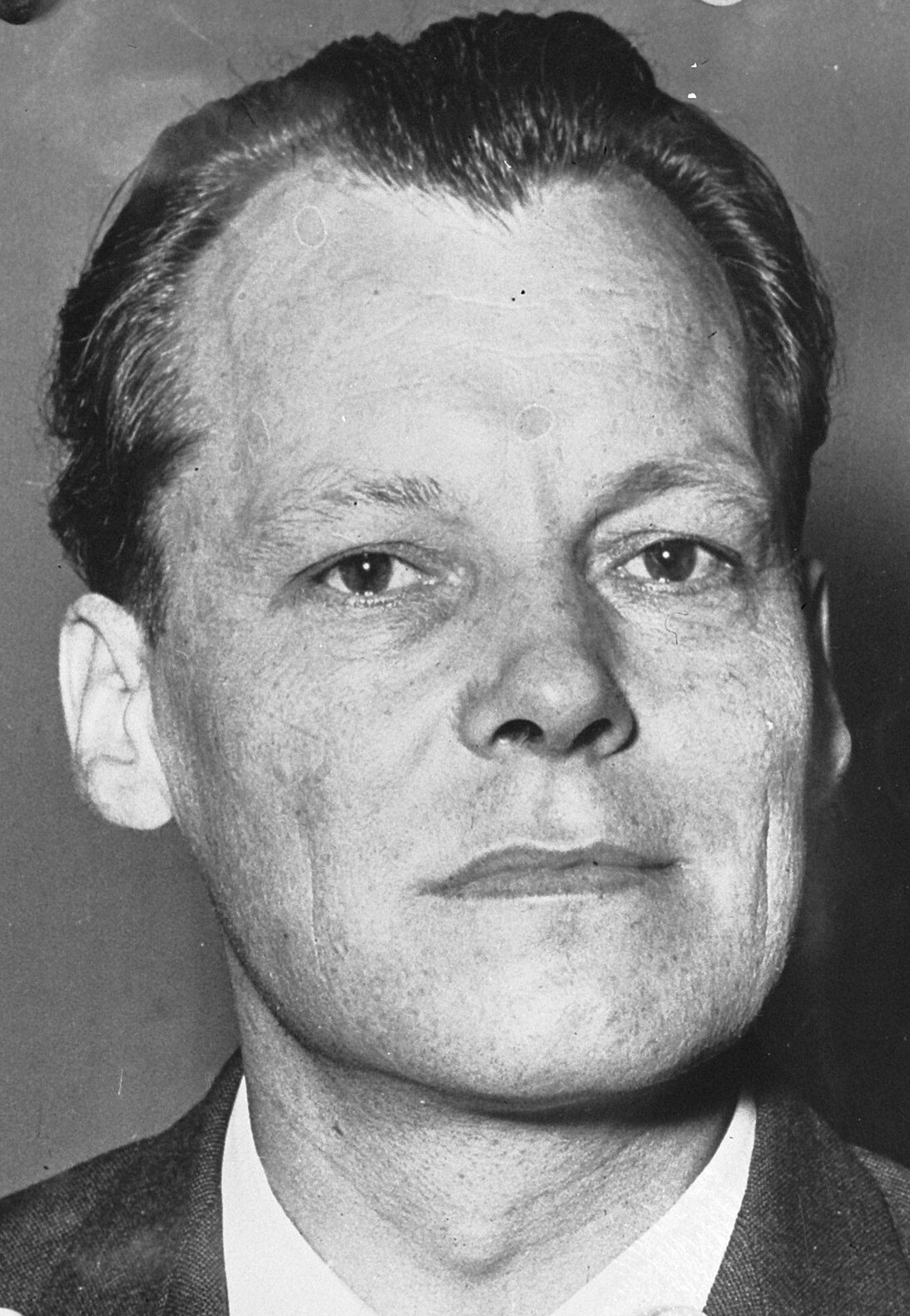

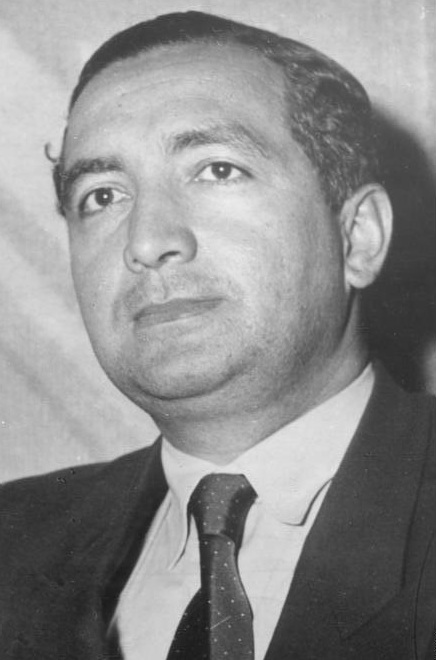
	First party	Second party	Third party
Candidate	Konrad Adenauer	Willy Brandt	Erich Mende
Party	CDU/CSU	SPD	FDP
Last election	50.2%, 270 seats	31.8%, 169 seats	7.7%, 41 seats
Seats won	242 (Note: As well as 9 non-voting delegates for West Berlin.)	190 (Note: As well as 13 non-voting delegates for West Berlin.)	67
Seat change	▼28	▲21	▲26
Popular vote	14,298,372	11,427,355	4,028,766
Percentage	45.3%	36.2%	12.8%
Swing	▼4.9 pp	▲4.4 pp	▲5.1 pp
- The left side shows constituency winners of the election by their party colours. The right side shows party list winners of the election for the additional members by their party colours.
Government before election
Third Adenauer cabinet
CDU/CSU
Government after election
Fourth Adenauer cabinet
CDU/CSU-FDP

A federal election was held in West Germany on 17 September 1961 to elect the members of the fourth Bundestag. The CDU/CSU remained the largest faction, winning 242 of the 499 seats. However, the loss of its majority and the All-German Party losing all its seats led to the CDU having to negotiate a coalition with the long-term junior coalition partner, the Free Democratic Party, leading to a demand for long-term chancellor Konrad Adenauer to leave office in 1963, halfway through his term.

== Campaign ==
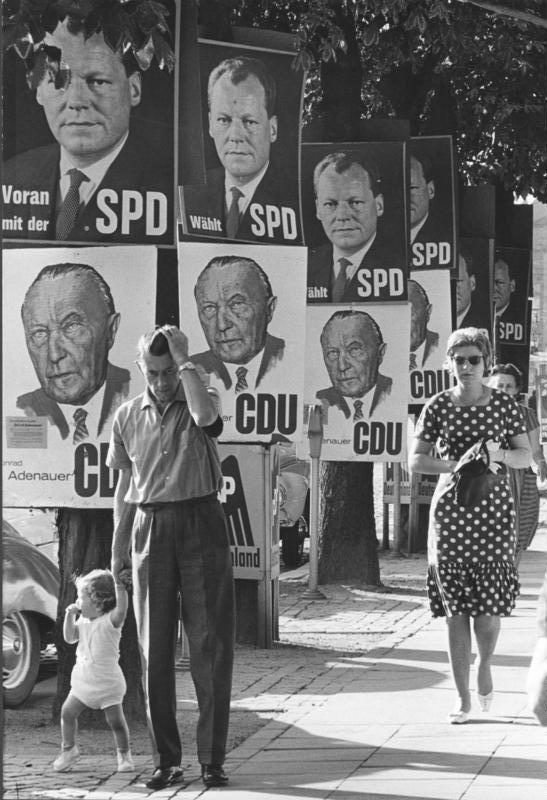
Election posters

The election campaign occurred in the context of the Berlin Crisis and the erection of the Berlin Wall.

For the first time, the SPD announced a Chancellor candidate who was not chairman of the party: Willy Brandt, the Governing Mayor of West Berlin. After the building of the Berlin Wall, he gained more and more sympathy, while chancellor Konrad Adenauer was criticised for not showing enough support for the people of West Berlin. Adenauer had to save the absolute majority of CDU and CSU, but, considering his age and his long term as chancellor, there were big doubts if he should lead the country in a fourth term.

== Results ==
Party	Party-list			Constituency			Seats			
Party	Votes	%	Seats	Votes	%	Seats	Elected	West Berlin	Total	+/–
Social Democratic Party	11,427,355	36.22	99	11,672,057	36.47	91	190	13	203	+22
Christian Democratic Union	11,283,901	35.76	78	11,622,995	36.32	114	192	9	201	−21
Free Democratic Party	4,028,766	12.77	67	3,866,269	12.08	0	67	0	67	+24
Christian Social Union	3,014,471	9.55	8	3,104,742	9.70	42	50	0	50	−5
All-German Party	870,756	2.76	0	859,290	2.68	0	0	0	0	−18
German Peace Union	609,918	1.93	0	587,488	1.84	0	0	0	0	0
Deutsche Reichspartei	262,977	0.83	0	242,649	0.76	0	0	0	0	0
German Community	27,308	0.09	0	21,083	0.07	0	0	0	0	0
South Schleswig Voters' Association	25,449	0.08	0	24,951	0.08	0	0	0	0	0
Electoral Group for a Neutral Germany				778	0.00	0	0	0	0	New
Independents and voter groups				2,164	0.01	0	0	0	0	0
Total	31,550,901	100.00	252	32,004,466	100.00	247	499	22	521	+2
Valid votes	31,550,901	96.05		32,004,466	97.43					
Invalid/blank votes	1,298,723	3.95		845,158	2.57					
Total votes	32,849,624	100.00		32,849,624	100.00					
Registered voters/turnout	37,440,715	87.74		37,440,715	87.74					
Source: Bundeswahlleiter

=== Results by state ===
==== Constituency seats ====
State	Total seats	Seats won		
State	Total seats	CDU	SPD	CSU
Baden-Württemberg	33	27	6	
Bavaria	47		5	42
Bremen	3		3	
Hamburg	8		8	
Hesse	22	3	19	
Lower Saxony	34	15	19	
North Rhine-Westphalia	66	41	25	
Rhineland-Palatinate	15	10	5	
Saarland	5	5		
Schleswig-Holstein	14	13	1	
Total	247	114	91	42

==== List seats ====
State	Total seats	Seats won			
State	Total seats	SPD	CDU	FDP	CSU
Baden-Württemberg	33	16	5	12	
Bavaria	39	23		8	8
Bremen	2		1	1	
Hamburg	10	1	6	3	
Hesse	23	2	14	7	
Lower Saxony	26	6	11	9	
North Rhine-Westphalia	89	35	35	19	
Rhineland-Palatinate	16	6	6	4	
Saarland	4	3		1	
Schleswig-Holstein	10	7		3	
Total	252	99	78	67	8

== Aftermath ==
The absolute majority was lost by the conservative union due to the gains of the liberal FDP under Erich Mende. From 1961 on, the Union, SPD and FDP established an electoral "triopoly" in the Bundestag that would last until 1983.

Konrad Adenauer remained Chancellor, building a coalition between the CDU/CSU-FDP. In 1962 he had to announce a fifth cabinet: The FDP had temporarily left the coalition after the secretary of defense, Franz Josef Strauß (CSU), had ordered the arrest of five journalists for publishing a memo detailing alleged weaknesses in the German armed forces (known as the Spiegel scandal). In 1963 Adenauer finally retired; Ludwig Erhard took over his position as head of the coalition government.
