= Hans Lenz =

German politician (1907–1968)

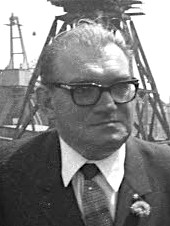
- Lenz in 1964

Federal Minister for Scientific Research
- In office 14 December 1962 – 26 October 1965
- Chancellor: Konrad Adenauer; Ludwig Erhard
- Preceded by: Siegfried Balke
- Succeeded by: Gerhard Stoltenberg

Federal Minister of the Treasury
- In office 14 December 1961 – 19 November 1962
- Chancellor: Konrad Adenauer
- Preceded by: Hans Wilhelmi
- Succeeded by: Werner Dollinger

Member of the Bundestag for Baden-Württemberg
- In office 6 September 1953 – 5 November 1967

Personal details
- Born: 12 July 1907 Trossingen, Kingdom of Württemberg, German Empire
- Died: 28 August 1968 (aged 61) Trossingen, Baden-Württemberg, West Germany
- Party: NSDAP (1933–1945); FDP (1948–1968)

Military service
- Allegiance: Nazi Germany
- Branch/service: Abwehr
- Years of service: 1942–1945
- Rank: Leutnant

Hans Lenz (12 July 1907 – 28 August 1968) was a German politician of the FDP. He was Federal Minister of the Treasury for a brief period under Konrad Adenauer in 1962 and was then Federal Minister for Scientific Research from 1962 to 1965. Lenz also served as a Member of the Bundestag from 1953 to 1967.

Lenz was born in Trossingen into the family behind the musical instrument manufacturing company Hohner. After studying abroad, Lenz completed an apprenticeship in bookselling. He was then a publishing director for different publishing houses in Germany and Brno. Lenz joined the Nazi Party in 1933, and was drafted into the Wehrmacht, whereupon he worked in the Abwehr as an intelligence agent. In this position he rose to the rank of Leutnant and was awarded the Iron Cross twice, but sustained a lifelong injury in Poland. After the war, he joined the DVP, which merged soon after to create the FDP/DVP. He was then elected to the Bundestag in 1953, staying there until 1967 when he left for health reasons and was succeeded by Gustav Freiherr von Gemmingen-Hornberg.

Lenz was first appointed minister as Federal Minister of the Treasury in Konrad Adenauer's fourth cabinet as part of a black-yellow coalition. During his time as minister, he primarily worked on organizing the departments within the ministry after Franz Josef Strauss annexed part of it. He also worked on privatizing companies like Preussag and Vereinigte Industrieunternehmungen AG (VIAG). He resigned in 1962 due to the Spiegel affair, but a few months later was appointed Federal Minister for Scientific Research. Lenz was appointed during an important time in science, when the Space Race was at its height along with the nuclear arms race between the Soviet Union and the United States. In this role, he tried to secure funding for the ministry, declaring it must be doubled as Germany had lagged behind other nations. West Germany took a leading part in European Launcher Development Organisation (ELDO) during his term and he secured an agreement with NASA to launch German satellites into space in 1968. He left on 26 October 1965.

== Early life ==
Lenz was born on 12 July 1907 in Trossingen, which was then part of the German Empire. His family had traditionally been instrument makers, as his great-grandfather, Matthias Hohner, founded the musical instrument manufacturing company Hohner. However, his father was a merchant. In 1914 he started attending the elementary school in Trossingen, and then from 1917-1922 he attended the Realschule in the town. He transferred to Dillmann-Realgymnasium in Stuttgart that year, graduating in 1926. After graduating, he studied modern philology in Tübingen, Berlin, London, Paris and Reykjavik until 1931. He specialized in Nordic philology and the basics of German heroic sagas. While studying, he met many leaders of the German Democratic Party, including Erich Koch-Weser and Theodor Heuss, which inspired him to join the student union. In 1932 he passed the Staatsexamen, and then began an apprenticeship in Stuttgart in bookselling which he completed in 1935. He then worked as the head of the Priebatsch publishing house in Breslau from 1936 to 1941. In 1942 he began working in Brno-Vienna as publishing director of the Rudolf M. Rohrer publishing house before being drafted.

He joined the NSDAP on 1 May 1933. From 1943 he served in the Wehrmacht intelligence unit. He eventually rose to the rank of Leutnant, and received the Iron Cross in 1st and 2nd classes. Lenz sustained a splinter in his hip while serving in the intelligence unit in Poland in 1945. He was briefly a prisoner of war in Heilbronn.

After the war he was the deputy director of the State University Institute for Music Education from 1947 to 1950. He first entered politics during this time by joining the DVP in 1948, which was soon after merged to create FDP/DVP. In 1951 he became administrative director of the Hohner Foundation. That same year he was elected deputy chairman of the party in Württemberg-Hohenzollern, which he did until 1952, and sat on the Trossingen municipal council.

In 1959 he wrote in the first edition of the German magazine Liberal for the Hohner Foundation. From 1965 until his death he was the President of the Board of Trustees of the Deutsche Stiftung Musikleben and the Friedrich Naumann Foundation.

== Political career ==
=== Bundestag ===
Lenz won a seat to the Bundestag in the 1953 West German federal election, representing the FDP via state list.

During his time in the assembly, he took a notable stance against growing state expenditures. He called on the government to make savings and cut some German jobs if need be. He also objected to the expansion of any ministries. During the Cold War he called for there to be a more active Eastern European policy while also maintaining ties to the West and for the German ambassador to the Soviet Union, Wilhelm Haas, to be more active.

From 1960 to 1964 he was the vice-president of the FDP. Also, from 1959 to 1966, he was part of the FDP federal executive committee. In the Bundestag he was the deputy chairman of the FDP parliamentary group from 1957 to 1961.

He left the Bundestag for health reasons on 5 October 1967. He was replaced by Gustav Freiherr von Gemmingen-Hornberg, as he was the next candidate on the state list in accordance with the Federal Elections Act.

=== Minister of the Treasury ===
Lenz was appointed Federal Minister of the Treasury in Konrad Adenauer's fourth cabinet on 14 December 1961. He was appointed as part of Adenauer's black-yellow coalition. He agreed to take over the treasury as long as the condition was met that he could also be President of the Working Group of Folk Music Associations.

At the time, most of the FDP considered the ministry to just be a liaison office between the economic and finance ministries, but the more liberal members said the office had weight regardless if Strauss had deprecated most of Lenz's functions. Lenz dealt with having a completely disorganized ministry after coming into office, as a few months before Franz Josef Strauss had annexed two departments of Treasury Subdivision II A - which was for land acquisition for the Bundeswehr and accommodation - as part of his growing ministry. He also wanted to bring Friedrich Karl Vialon into his ministry from the chancellory. His agenda consisted of the privatization of Preussag, the sale of federal shares in the Volkswagen plant, and also privatizing Vereinigte Industrieunternehmungen AG (VIAG). However, he was personally skeptical of this privatization saying it, at best, popularized the shares.

He resigned on 19 November 1962 as minister because of the Spiegel affair.

=== Minister for Scientific Research ===
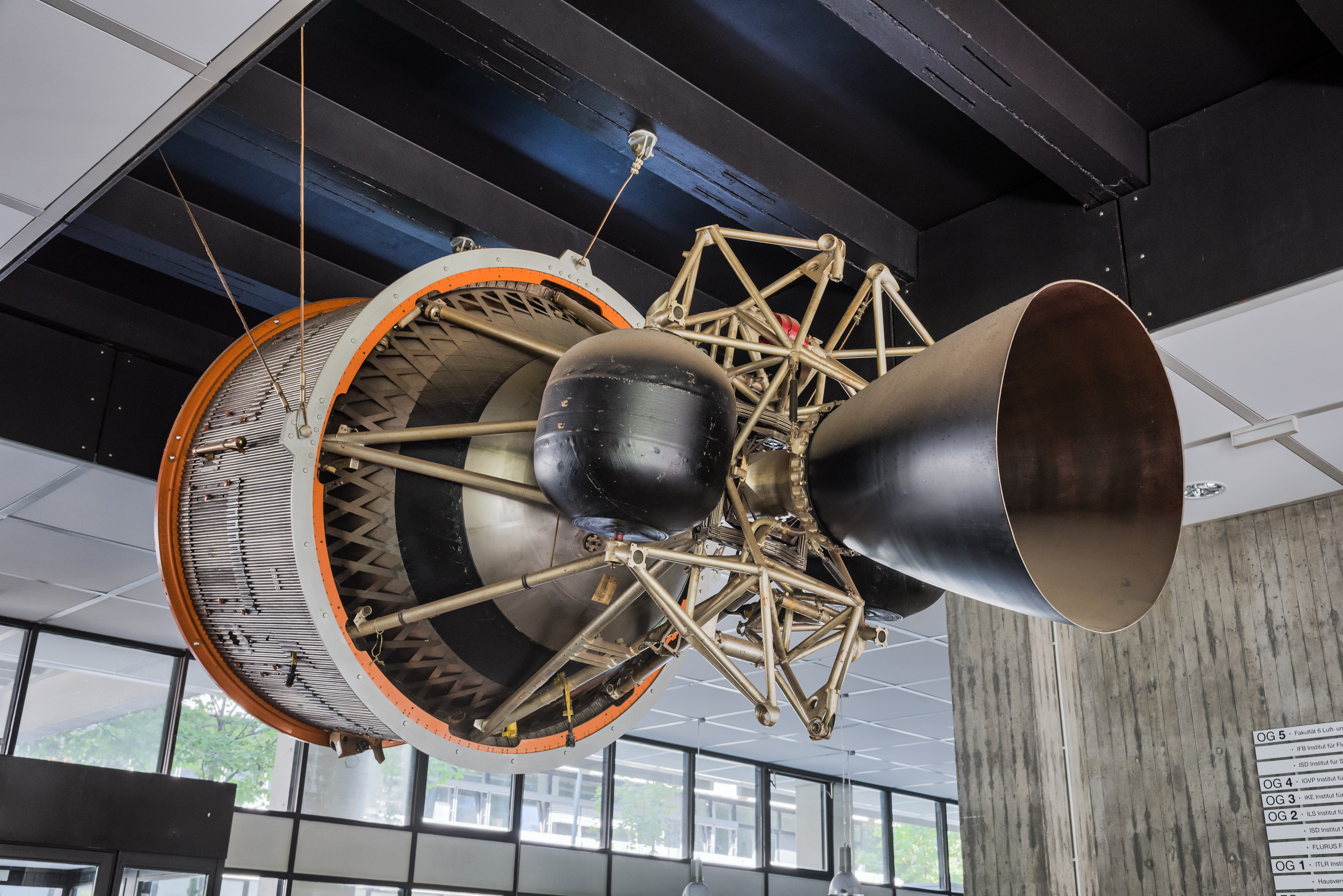
The third stage of the Europa I rocket, called Astris. A central part of Lenz's time as minister was space, and West Germany was tasked with building the satellites once Europa I was in orbit along with Astris as part of ELDO.

He was appointed Federal Minister for Scientific Research on 14 December 1962, again under Adenauer although his term would continue into when Ludwig Erhard was Chancellor in Erhard's first cabinet. He was given the portfolio after the expansion of the Ministry of Atomic Energy under Siegfried Balke. Lenz was appointed during an important time in science, when the Space Race was at its height along with the nuclear arms race between the Soviet Union and the United States.

During his time as minister, funding for the ministry was rapidly increased, more than the rate of the federal budget. However, unlike other nations at the time, space research did not get much funding which halted German competition in the space race. The funding for space research was 1.8% of the national budget, in comparison to the 3% of the American budget, and said that the budget must be doubled by 1970.

In 1963 the first German nuclear program was presented by his ministry. West Germany took a leading part in the European Launcher Development Organisation (ELDO) during his term, as they were tasked with developing the satellite for Europa 1. In 1965 Lenz announced that the government had reached an agreement with NASA in which the Americans would launch a German research satellite into space. It was agreed that the launch would be in 1968 in California.

He left the position on 26 October 1965, and was succeeded by Gerhard Stoltenberg in Erhard's second cabinet.

== Personal life ==
He was married and had three children, one of whom was named Sabena. For his entire life since the injury in Poland he had he suffered from severe osteoarthritis, and had great difficulty walking which required crutches.

=== Death ===
Lenz died on 28 August 1968 in Trossingen, West Germany. His death was attributed to the injury he received during the war in Poland.

He was buried in his hometown, Trossingen, at the Hohner family cemetery with a funeral service at the Lutheran church and a state ceremony at Ernst Hohner Concert Hall after being transported in a specially designed open hearse. A national day of mourning was scheduled on 3 September 1968.

== Honours and awards ==
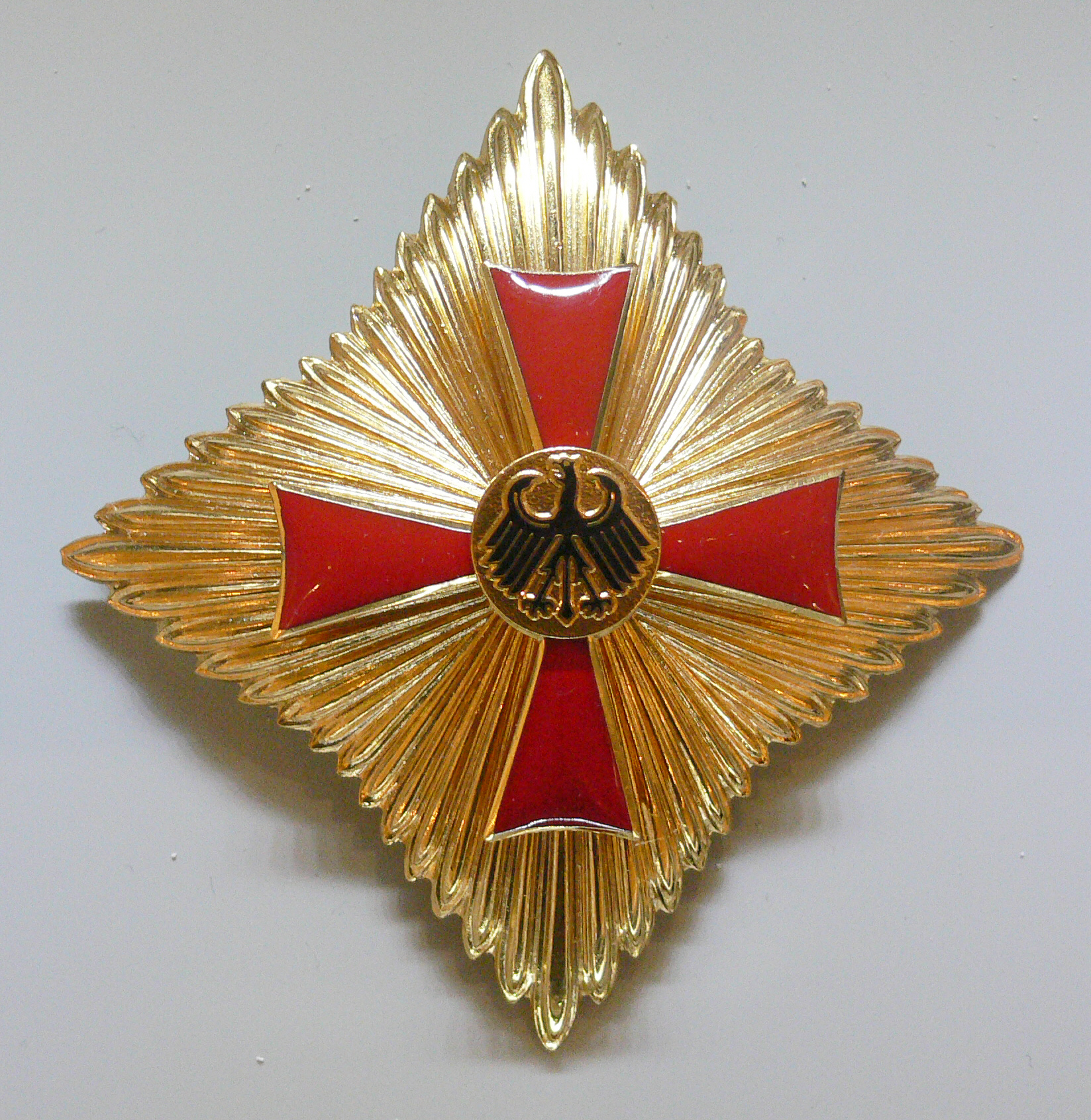
Star of the Grand Cross of the Order of Merit

- Nazi Germany: Iron Cross 1st class
- Nazi Germany: Iron Cross 2nd class
- West Germany: Grand Cross of the Order of Merit
- Iceland: Order of the Falcon
- Honorary citizen of Trossingen
- Honorary Senator of the University of Tübingen

Since 2006 the Deutsche Stiftung Musikleben has awarded a medal in his honour to individuals or institutions who have made "a special contribution to anchoring music in society and the importance of amateur music-making".
