= Chancellor of Germany =

Head of government

Federal Chancellor of the Federal Republic of Germany
- Bundeskanzler der Bundesrepublik Deutschland
- Logo of the German Chancellor

- Standard of the German Chancellor

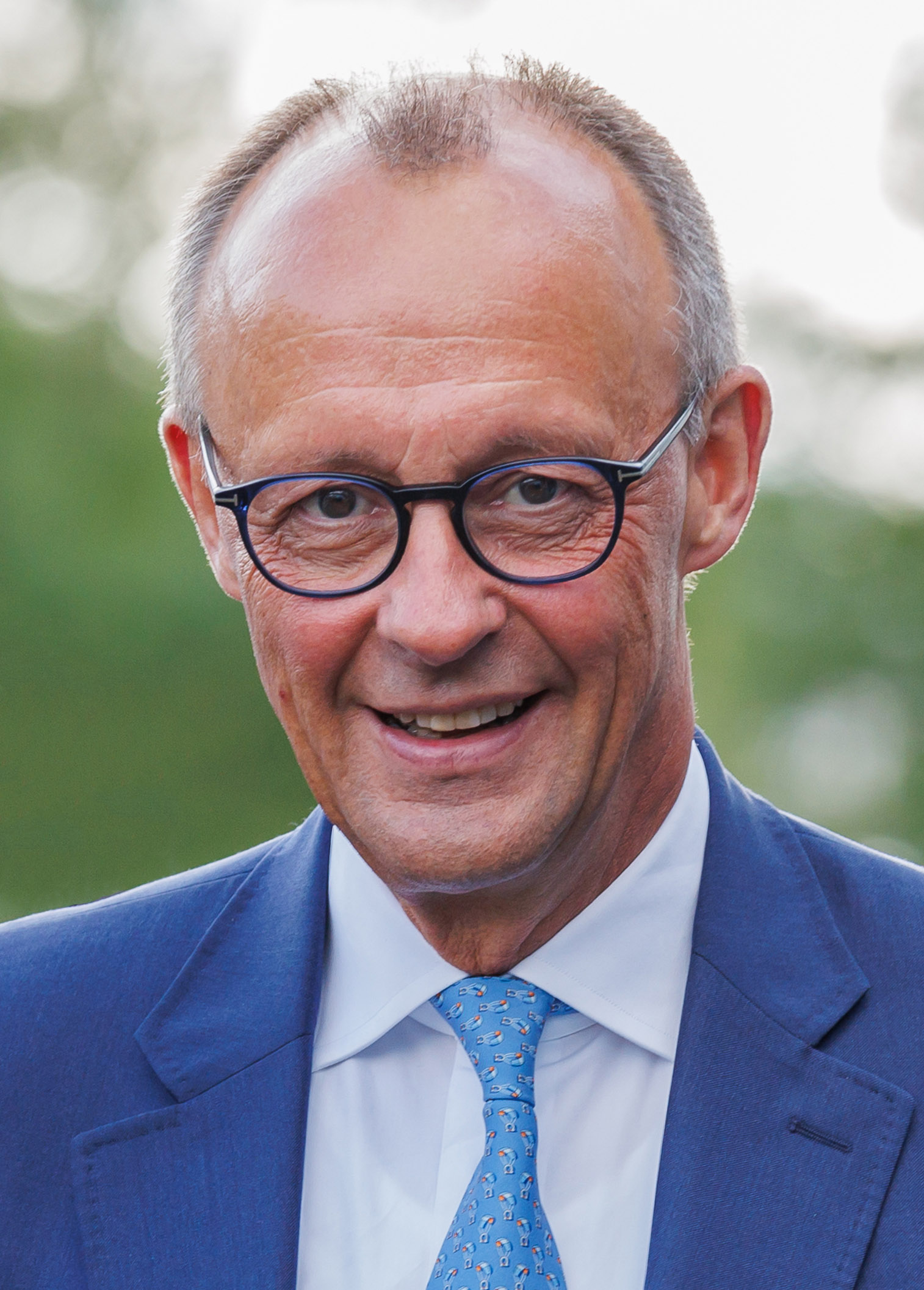
- Incumbent; Friedrich Merz since 6 May 2025
- Executive branch of the Federal Government; Federal Chancellery
- Style: Mr. Chancellor (informal); His Excellency (diplomatic)
- Type: Head of government Commander-in-Chief during state of defence
- Member of: Federal Cabinet; European Council
- Residence: Federal Chancellery, Berlin
- Seat: Federal Chancellery, Berlin (main seat); Palais Schaumburg, Bonn (secondary seat)
- Nominator: President
- Appointer: President upon election by the Bundestag
- Term length: until the constitution of a new Bundestag (renewable)
- Constituting instrument: German Basic Law (German Constitution)
- Formation: 1 July 1867; 159 years ago
- First holder: Otto von Bismarck
- Deputy: Vice Chancellor
- Salary: €255,150 per year (as of 2020)
- Website: bundeskanzler.de/bk-en

The chancellor of Germany, officially the federal chancellor of the Federal Republic of Germany, (Note: German: Bundeskanzler(in) der Bundesrepublik Deutschland; often shortened to Bundeskanzler/Bundeskanzlerin, pronounced [ˈbʊndəsˌkant͡slɐ] /[ˈbʊndəsˌkant͡sləʁɪn]) is the head of government of Germany. The chancellor is elected by the Bundestag on the proposal of the federal president and without debate (Article 63 of the German Constitution). During a state of defence declared by the Bundestag the chancellor also assumes the position of commander-in-chief of the Bundeswehr.

Ten people (nine men and one woman) have served as chancellor of the Federal Republic of Germany, the first being Konrad Adenauer from 1949 to 1963. (Another 26 men had served as "Reich chancellors" of the previous German Empire from 1871 to 1945.) The current officeholder is Friedrich Merz of the Christian Democratic Union, sworn in on 6 May 2025.

== History of the office (pre-1949) ==
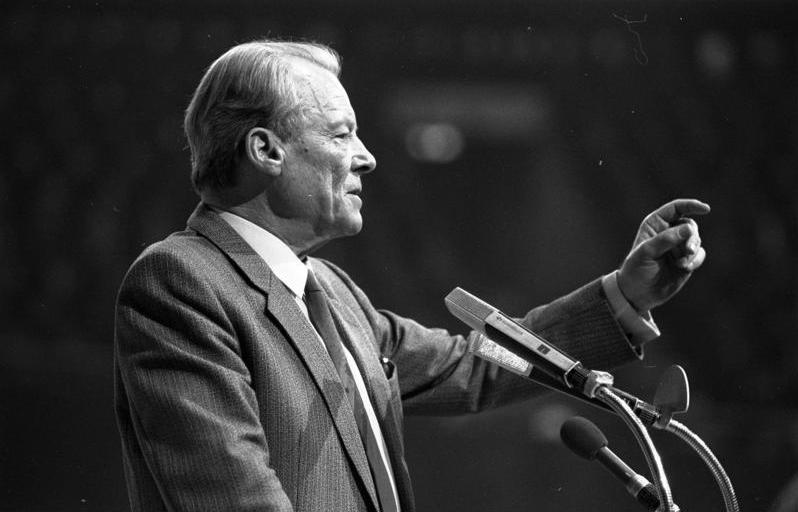
Former Governing Mayor of Berlin, then Federal Republic of Germany (West Germany) Chancellor Willy Brandt (served 1969–1974), speaking at his Social Democratic Party of Germany (SPD) meeting in Dortmund (1983)

The office of chancellor has a long history, stemming back to the Holy Roman Empire (c. 900–1806). The title of chancellor (Latin: cancellarius) was given to the head of the clerics at the Imperial chapel. The chapel's college acted as the emperor's chancery issuing deeds and capitularies. Eventually, the office of imperial archchancellor was given to the archbishops of Mainz.

In 1559, Emperor Ferdinand I established the agency of an imperial chancellery (Reichshofkanzlei) at the Hofburg Palace in Vienna, headed by a vice chancellor under the nominal authority of the archbishop of Mainz. Upon the 1620 Battle of White Mountain, Emperor Ferdinand II created the office of court chancellor for the Archduchy of Austria. This office was in charge of the internal and foreign affairs of the Habsburg monarchy. From May 1753 to August 1792, the office of an Austrian state chancellor was held by Prince Kaunitz. The imperial chancellery lost its importance, and from the days of Queen Maria Theresa and Holy Roman emperor Joseph II, merely existed on paper. After the 1806 dissolution of the Holy Roman Empire by Napoleon, Prince Klemens von Metternich served as state chancellor of the Austrian Empire. Likewise Prince Karl August von Hardenberg acted as chancellor of the Kingdom of Prussia (1810–1822). At the conclusion of the Napoleonic Wars, the Congress of Vienna established the German Confederation as a replacement for the Holy Roman Empire, but this organisation did not have a government or legislature, only the Bundestag that represented the member states.

The modern office of chancellor was established with the beginning of the North German Confederation in 1867, after the Prussian Army's decisive victory in the brief Austro-Prussian War of 1866 over the rival Austrian Empire. Unlike its predecessor the German Confederation, the North German Confederation did have an office of Bundeskanzler (federal Chancellor), which was given to the Minister-President of Prussia Otto von Bismarck. In 1871 the North German Confederation transformed into the German Empire, with the federal chancellor becoming Reichskanzler (imperial chancellor). The office of Reichskanzler continued during the Weimar Republic (1918–1933).

In Nazi Germany the office of Reichskanzler was never formally abolished, but instead combined with the office of Reichspräsident. On 1 August 1934, the day before Reichspräsident Paul von Hindenburg's death, the Hitler cabinet passed a law merging the offices of Reich Chancellor and Reich President in the person of Hitler. This law came into force upon Hindenburg's death.

In May 1949, four years after the End of World War II in Europe, the Basic Law of the Federal Republic of Germany, aka West Germany, revived the office of Bundeskanzler.

The reunification of Germany (3 October 1990) continued the Basic Law of the Federal Republic for the reunited German state, including the office of chancellor.

The role of chancellor has varied during different eras. From 1867 to 1918, the chancellor was the only responsible minister at the federal level. He was appointed by the Bundespräsidium, (i.e. the King of Prussia; the Emperor of Germany from 1871). The state secretaries (Staatssekretäre) were civil servants subordinate to the chancellor and similar to ministers. Besides his executive duties, the constitution gave the chancellor only one function: presiding over the Bundesrat (Federal Council), the representative organ of the various German states. The chancellor was also nearly always Minister President of Prussia, which was the largest and dominant state in the Empire. Indirectly, this gave him the power of the Bundesrat, including to dissolve the parliament and call for elections.

Although effective government was possible only in cooperation with the Reichstag, the results of the elections had at most an indirect influence on the chancellorship. By October 1918 on the verge of disastrous defeat in the First World War, was the Empire's 1871 constitution changed and reformed, to require that the chancellor have the confidence of parliament (as in the UK House of Commons and other European parliamentary democracies).

On 9 November 1918, Chancellor Max von Baden declared the abdication of the emperor Wilhelm II without having been authorized to do so by Wilhelm.

Wilhelm had left Berlin on 29 October to travel to Spa, Belgium where the Oberste Heeresleitung resided. On 10 November, one day after the republic in Germany had been proclamated, Wilhelm fled to the Netherlands and asked for asylum (that Queen Wilhelinma granted him two days later). At the end of November 1918, his wife emperess Auguste Victoria left Berlin and travelled to the Netherlands.

Following the defeat a new post-war democratic Republican government was set up by the popularly elected Weimar National Assembly, which met in Weimar (Thuringia in 1919/20. According to the Weimar constitution, the chancellor was head of a collegial democratic government. The chancellor was appointed by the new president of Germany (Reich President), as were the subordinate ministers of various portfolios (departments / agencies) on the chancellor's recommendation. The chancellor or any minister had to be dismissed if Reichstag demanded it. As today, the chancellor had the prerogative to determine the policy direction of his government. In reality this power was limited by the needs of coalition governments of the several major political parties (and numerous smaller minor ones) plus the powers of the Reich President. Cabinet decisions were taken by majority vote. Under the circumstances, much like his French counterpart, the Weimar-era chancellor was as much the chairman of the cabinet as he was its leader.

On 30 January 1933 (seizure of power day), Adolf Hitler of the Nazi Party, the biggest party in parliament, was appointed chancellor by President Paul von Hindenburg. Subsequently, the 1919 Weimar Constitution was de facto set aside. After Hindenburg's death on 2 August 1934, Hitler arrogated to himself the powers of the president. He chose the official title Führer und Reichskanzler (meaning "Leader and Chancellor of the Reich").

The 1949 constitution gave the chancellor greater powers than during the Weimar Republic of the 1920s and early 1930s, while strongly diminishing the role of the president of Germany. Germany has often been referred to as a "chancellor democracy", reflecting the role of the chancellor as Germany's chief executive.

Since 1867, over 30 people have served as chancellor of the North German Confederation, the German Empire, the Weimar Republic, Nazi Germany, West Germany and the current Federal Republic of Germany.

In communist East Germany (1949–1990), the position of chancellor did not exist. The equivalent position of head of government was called either Minister President (Ministerpräsident) or Chairman of the Council of Ministers (Vorsitzender des Ministerrats), which was the second most powerful position after General Secretary of the Socialist Unity Party of Germany (See Leaders of East Germany).

=== North German Confederation (1867–1870) and German Empire ===
Constitutional chart for the German Empire

The North German Confederation was created on 1 July 1867. According to the constitution of this federal state, the king of Prussia served as Bundespräsidium (in fact a head of state) and appointed a Bundeskanzler. This chancellor was the only member of the executive, the only responsible minister. Legislation was the task of two organs:

- the Bundesrat, the federal council, as the representative organ of the German states that had joined the federal state;
- the Reichstag, the federal parliament, representing the voters (male suffrage).

A law could only pass with the consent of both organs. The federal council was not considered to be a parliament or parliament chamber, as its members were not elected for a fixed period of time, but appointed representatives of the states' governments. Though, the two organs can also be described as upper house and lower house since they shared the task of legislation.

After the south German states had joined the federal state in 1870/71, during the war against France, the North German Confederation transformed into the Deutsches Reich or German Empire. At this occasion, the term Bundeskanzler was recoined as Reichskanzler, and the king of Prussia was given the title of emperor additionally. The political system remained largely the same.

Otto von Bismarck was (from 1862) Prime Minister of Prussia, the largest state in the Confederation. He retained this office and used it to set up the new federal state; he was not interested in a fully developed federal executive with cabinet ministers acting independently. But Bismarck also had another reason to remain Prime Minister of Prussia.

According to the constitution, the chancellor was only a federal minister and presided over the Bundesrat. As chancellor, his powers were limited because he could not introduce bills, speak in parliament or dismiss parliament (which the Prussian government could do in Prussia, for example). As chairman of the Bundesrat, he had no voting rights.

It therefore made sense for Bismarck to hold both offices, at federal and state level:

- In Prussia, he was appointed Prussian foreign minister and Prussian minister president at the same time (the minister president was always one of the cabinet ministers responsible for a ministry).
- As the most powerful politician in Prussia, he had a decisive influence on Prussian votes in the Bundesrat.
- Prussia had 17 votes in the Bundesrat. Although this was not the majority, it was the largest vote of any single state. The Prussian vote usually became the basis for a majority in the Bundesrat, as Prussia only needed a few of the other states to join its position.

Through this bundling of offices, chancellor Bismarck used the power of the federal council to govern. As a member of the federal council, he had speaking rights in the parliament. He de facto introduced draft bills into the legislative process. Thanks to the federal council he could, with the approval of the emperor, dismiss parliament and call for new elections. Likewise, most of Bismarck's successors were chancellor and prime minister at the same time, although the constitution never asked for this combination.

In 1878, a new law (Stellvertretungsgesetz) installed the office of Staatssekretär. The chancellor was given the opportunity to formally install state secretaries to represent him and sign for him (contraseign). The chancellor, though, could overrule any of them any time. The office of State Secretary did not formally evolve into a cabinet minister. In practice, however, state secretaries acted in a similar way to ministers in other countries.

The constitution of the German Empire was reformed on 29 October 1918, when the parliament (Reichstag) was given the right to dismiss the chancellor. The reform was obviously too little too late to prevent the outbreak of revolution (Kiel mutiny) on 3 November 1918.

=== Revolutionary period (1918–1919) ===
On 9 November 1918, chancellor Prince Maximilian of Baden handed over his office of chancellor to the leader of the Majority Social Democrats, Friedrich Ebert. Ebert continued to serve as head of government during the three months between the abdication of Kaiser Wilhelm II and the end of the German Empire in November 1918, the beginning of the November 11, 1918, Armistice, and the first gathering behind the Western Front battle lines and trenches of the new National Assembly of the German Republic (Weimar Republic) several months later in the town of Weimar, in February 1919, but Ebert only occasionally signed as chancellor.

During that time, Ebert also served as chairman of the "Council of the People's Deputies", until on 29 December 1918 together with the allied Independent Social Democrat party leader Hugo Haase. This council de facto took over the roles of emperor, parliament and federal council. The council called for the election of a constituent assembly on 19 January 1919.

=== Weimar Republic (1919–1933) ===
The office of chancellor (Reichskanzler) was continued in the Weimar Republic. The Weimar Constitution provided for a two-part executive consisting of a Reich president and a government made up of Reich ministers and a Reich chancellor (Article 52) who determined the guidelines of the government's policy (Article 56).

The constitution stipulated that the president appoint and dismiss the chancellor and ministers. The ministers were appointed by the president on the recommendation of the chancellor (Article 53), and members of the government required the confidence of the Reichstag (Article 54). The provisions gave rise to the question of who in fact was responsible for forming the government.

Constitutional law expert Ernst Rudolf Huber said that the constitution had tacitly assumed that the president would have discussions with party leaders in the Reichstag before he made ministerial appointments. Based on these talks, the president would get a sense of which potential chancellor would be able to build a stable majority in the Reichstag. According to the sense of the Weimar Constitution, the president was thus to have the initiative. The task of putting together the Reich government was nevertheless the responsibility of the chancellor. The president could not appoint anyone as minister whom the chancellor had not proposed.

The chancellor alone had to answer to the Reichstag and the president for the policy guidelines, and he determined whether the conduct of business by the individual Reich ministries conformed to the guidelines. The government's decisions required a majority vote of the ministers, who sitting together were known as the National Ministry (Article 58). The chancellor could therefore be outvoted, as could a department minister. The chancellor presided over the government, and he had to conduct business in accordance with given rules of procedure.

In practice the Reich chancellor's power to determine political guidelines was limited by his own party as well as the other parties in the governing coalition. The Weimar chancellors were accordingly men whose strength lay in mediation rather than political initiative. Constitutionally, there was also the fact that the president had certain special rights. The actions of the president required the countersignature of the chancellor or the minister or ministers concerned, but the president always had to be informed about matters of foreign and defence policy.

The Reichstag could call for the dismissal of any member of the government, including the chancellor. Under Articles 54 and 59, the Reichstag could also impeach the chancellor as well as the ministers and the president before the State Court for the German Reich (Staatsgerichtshof für das Deutsche Reich), the Weimar Republic's constitutional court.

=== Nazi Germany (1933–1945) ===
Adolf Hitler was appointed chancellor of Germany on 30 January 1933 by Paul von Hindenburg. On taking office, Hitler immediately began accumulating power and changing the nature of the chancellorship. After only two months in office, and following the burning of the Reichstag building, the parliament passed the Enabling Act giving the chancellor full legislative powers for a period of four years – the cabinet could introduce any law without consent of parliament.

Technically, however, Hindenburg was able to dismiss the chancellor. On 1 August 1934, when Hindenburg was already ill and expected to die in the near future, Hitler used the Enabling Act to pass a new law, which came into force one day later. This law on the head of state stated that the offices of Reich chancellor and Reich president would "merge" and that the powers of the Reich president would be transferred to the "Leader and Reich Chancellor Adolf Hitler". This can be interpreted as the abolition of the office of president; a president had to be elected every seven years, which was not in Hitler's interests. Hindenburg died on the same day, 2 August 1934.

In April 1945, Hitler gave instruction that upon his death, the office of the Führer would dissolve and be replaced by the previous system of administration: that of the office of the president separate from that of chancellor. On 30 April 1945, when Hitler committed suicide, he was briefly succeeded as Chancellor by Joseph Goebbels and as President of Germany by Grand Admiral Karl Dönitz. When Goebbels also committed suicide, Dönitz did not appoint a successor as Chancellor, instead appointing Count Schwerin von Krosigk as head of government with the title "Leading Minister".

== Federal Chancellor of the Federal Republic of Germany (1949–present) ==
The 1949 German constitution, the Basic Law (Grundgesetz), invests the chancellor (German, Bundeskanzler) with broad powers to initiate government policy. For that reason, some observers refer to the German political system as a "chancellor democracy". Even though the office of chancellor is often considered the most powerful in the German political system and is seen as such within the German public, it is only the third highest office, following the head of state (the president of Germany) and the president of the Bundestag, a position similar to the speaker of the federal parliament.

Whichever major party (historically, CDU/CSU or SPD) does not hold the chancellorship usually calls its leading candidate for the federal election "chancellor-candidate" (Kanzlerkandidat). The federal government (Bundesregierung) consists of the chancellor and cabinet ministers.

=== Role ===
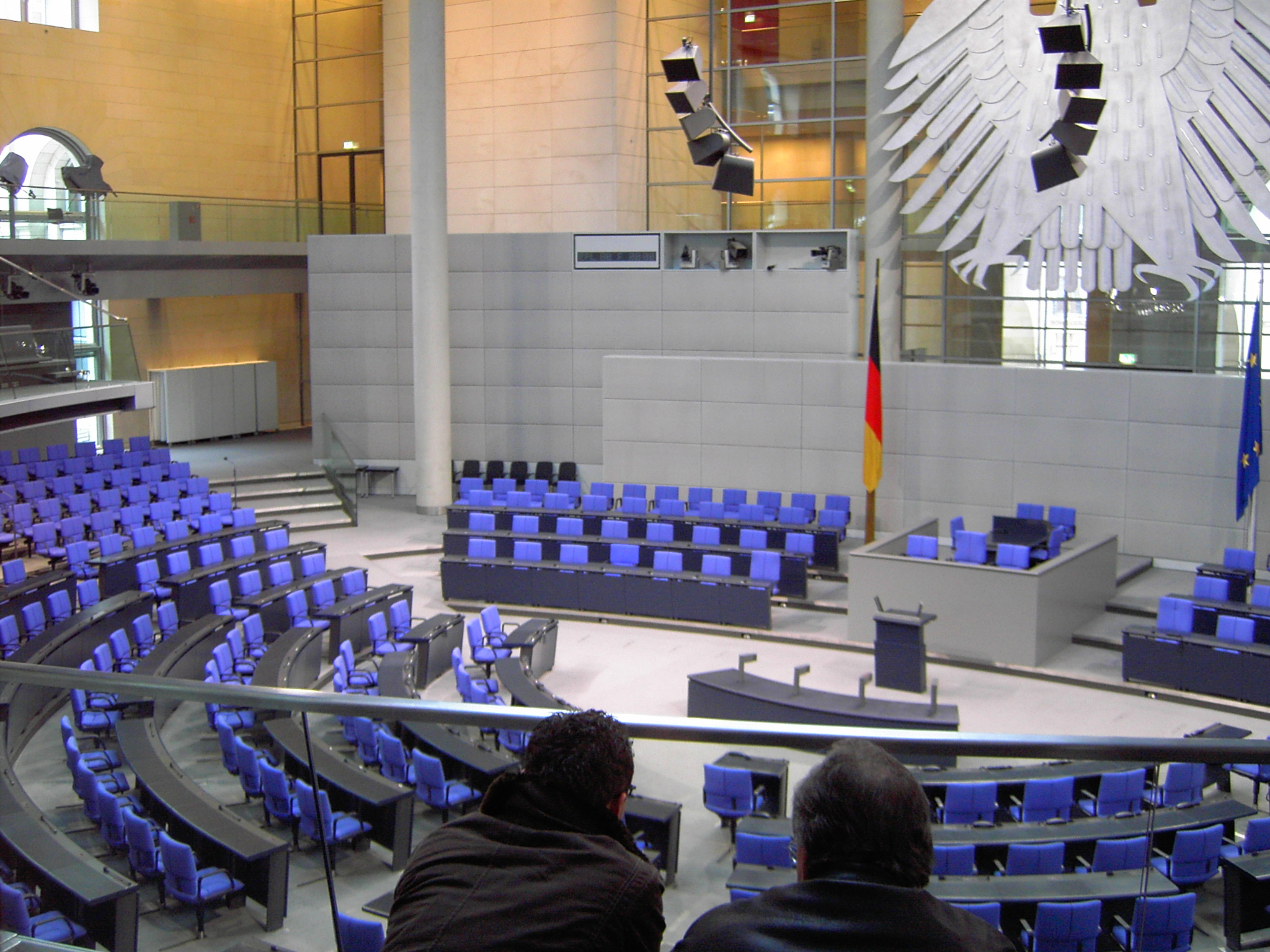
The cabinet bench in the Reichstag building (to the left of the flag) with the raised seat of the chancellor in the front row

The chancellor's authority emanates from the provisions of the Basic Law and in practice from their status as leader of the party (or coalition of parties) holding a majority of seats in the Bundestag (federal parliament). With the exception of Helmut Schmidt and Olaf Scholz, the chancellor has also been chairman of their own party. This was the case with Chancellor Gerhard Schröder from 1999 until he resigned the chairmanship of the SPD in 2004.

The first chancellor, Konrad Adenauer, set many precedents that continue today and established the chancellorship as the clear focus of power in Germany. Under the provisions of the Basic Law giving him the power to set guidelines for all fields of policy, Adenauer arrogated nearly all major decisions to himself. He often treated his ministers as mere extensions of his authority rather than colleagues. While his successors have tended to be less domineering, the chancellor has acquired enough ex officio authority (in addition to their constitutional powers) that Germany is often described by constitutional law experts as a "chancellor democracy".

The chancellor determines the composition of the Federal Cabinet. The president formally appoints and dismisses cabinet ministers, on the recommendation of the chancellor; no parliamentary approval is needed. According to the Basic Law, the chancellor may set the number of cabinet ministers and dictate their specific duties. Chancellor Ludwig Erhard had the largest cabinet, with 22 ministers, in the mid-1960s. Helmut Kohl presided over 17 ministers at the start of his fourth term in 1994; the 2002 cabinet, the second of Chancellor Gerhard Schröder, had 13 ministers, and the Angela Merkel cabinet as of 22 November 2005 had 15.

Article 65 of the Basic Law sets forth three principles that define how the executive branch functions:

- The "chancellor principle" makes the chancellor responsible for all government policies; this is also known as the Richtlinienkompetenz (roughly translated as "guideline setting competence"). Any formal policy guidelines issued by the chancellor are legally binding directives that cabinet ministers must implement. Cabinet ministers are expected to introduce specific policies at the ministerial level that reflect the chancellor's broader guidelines.
- The "principle of ministerial autonomy" entrusts each minister with the freedom to supervise departmental operations and prepare legislative proposals without cabinet interference so long as the minister's policies are consistent with the chancellor's broader guidelines.
- The "cabinet principle" calls for disagreements between federal ministers over jurisdictional or budgetary matters to be settled by the cabinet.

=== List of chancellors (present) ===
Political party: CDU SPD

Portrait	Name (Birth–Death)	Term of office		Political party	Vice Chancellor(s)	Cabinets
Portrait	Name (Birth–Death)	Term	Time in office	Political party	Vice Chancellor(s)	Cabinets
1	Konrad Adenauer (1876–1967)	15 September 1949 – 16 October 1963	14 years, 31 days	CDU	Franz Blücher (1949–57); Ludwig Erhard (1957–63)	I II III IV
2	Ludwig Erhard (1897–1977)	16 October 1963 – 1 December 1966	3 years, 46 days	CDU (Note: It is unclear whether and from when Erhard was formally a member of the CDU; however, he was a member of the CDU/CSU group in the German Bundestag throughout his chancellorship and was chairman of the CDU from 23 March 1966 – 23 May 1967, which implies membership at least during this period.)	Erich Mende (1963–66); Hans-Chr. Seebohm (1966)	I II
3	Kurt Georg Kiesinger (1904–1988)	1 December 1966 – 22 October 1969	2 years, 325 days	CDU	Willy Brandt (1966–69)	I
4	Willy Brandt (1913–1992)	22 October 1969 – 7 May 1974	4 years, 197 days	SPD	Walter Scheel (1969–74)	I II
Vice Chancellor Walter Scheel served as acting Chancellor from 7 May to 16 May 1974.
5	Helmut Schmidt (1918–2015)	16 May 1974 – 1 October 1982	8 years, 138 days	SPD	Hans-D. Genscher (1974–82); Egon Franke (1982)	I II III
6	Helmut Kohl (1930–2017)	1 October 1982 – 27 October 1998	16 years, 26 days	CDU	Hans-D. Genscher (1982–92); Jürgen Möllemann (1992–93); Klaus Kinkel (1993–98)	I II III IV V
7	Gerhard Schröder (b. 1944)	27 October 1998 – 22 November 2005	7 years, 26 days	SPD	Joschka Fischer (1998–2005)	I II
8	Angela Merkel (b. 1954)	22 November 2005 – 8 December 2021	16 years, 16 days	CDU	Franz Müntefering (2005–07); Frank-W. Steinmeier (2007–09); Guido Westerwelle (2009–11); Philipp Rösler (2011–13); Sigmar Gabriel (2013–18); Olaf Scholz (2018–21)	I II III IV
9	Olaf Scholz (b. 1958)	8 December 2021 – 6 May 2025	3 years, 149 days	SPD	Robert Habeck (2021–25)	I
10	Friedrich Merz (b. 1955)	6 May 2025 – Incumbent	1 year, 199 days	CDU	Lars Klingbeil (Incumbent)	I

=== Election ===
The chancellor is elected by the Bundestag and formally appointed by the president of Germany. This can be done by means of a regular election of the chancellor or by a constructive vote of no confidence. A regular chancellor's election is necessary whenever the office of chancellor has fallen vacant. This is the case if a newly elected Bundestag meets for the first time, or during legislative periods, if the former chancellor died or resigned.

The chancellor's election is one of the few cases in which a vote in the Bundestag requires a majority of all elected members, not just a majority of those assembled at the time, or the so-called Kanzlermehrheit ("chancellor majority"). Since the electoral reform of 2023, which was first implemented in the 2025 election, the number of members of the Bundestag has been set at 630, meaning that the majority required to elect a chancellor is always 316 votes. As with other elections performed by the Bundestag, the chancellor is elected via secret ballot. The election procedure laid down in the Basic Law can be divided into three phases:

==== Regular Chancellor election ====
The regular election of the Chancellor is described in Article 63 of the Basic Law and can extend over up to three election phases.

First voting phase
The process begins with the president of Germany proposing a candidate to the Bundestag, who is then voted upon without debate. Theoretically, the President is free in his decision, both in terms of the timing of the nomination and the person nominated; in practice however, the president waits for the conclusion of the usually necessary coalition negotiations after the election (as elections in Germany usually result in hung parliaments) and then nominates the person on whom the coalition parties have agreed. If this nominee reaches the necessary majority, the President will appoint him or her. Then, the president of the Bundestag will administer the oath of office before the assembled house. Of the 24 regular chancellor-elections in the history of the Federal Republic, 23 were successful in this phase (as of 2026).
Second voting phase
If the president's nominee is not elected, the right of nomination is transferred onto the Bundestag: Candidates can now be nominated for election, whereby a nomination must be supported by at least a quarter of all MPs. The Bundestag can hold any number of ballots on candidates proposed in this manner, for 14 days. According to the Standing Rules of the Bundestag, there must be a 48-hour interval between a nomination by the House and the vote; however, the Bundestag may waive this requirement by a two thirds majority. To be elected, a candidate still needs a "chancellor majority" of yes-votes. As of 2026, only one chancellor-election went into this phase: In 2025, the president's nominee Friedrich Merz failed to secure the necessary majority on the first ballot, but was successful on the second ballot, after having been renominated by the necessary quorum.
Third voting phase
If the Bundestag is unable to elect a chancellor in these 14 days, a final ballot is held on the very next day. Candidates may now be nominated from within the House (that is, any individual member is eligible to nominate a candidate), unless a nomination is supported by at least one-quarter of all members; in that case, all other nominations must also be supported by this quorum. Candidates receiving a "chancellor majority" in this ballot are elected. Otherwise, it is up to the president of Germany either to appoint the candidate with the plurality of votes as Chancellor or to dissolve the Bundestag and call a snap election. As of 2026, no chancellor-election has proceeded to this phase.

==== Constructive vote of no confidence ====
Another possibility to vote a new chancellor into office is the constructive vote of no confidence, which allows the Bundestag to replace a sitting chancellor via a motion of no-confidence, if it elects a new chancellor with the "chancellor-majority" at the same time (see "Confidence", below). Of the two constructive votes of no confidence tabled in the history of the Federal Republic, one failed (Rainer Barzel against Willy Brandt in 1972), while one was successful (Helmut Kohl against Helmut Schmidt in 1982).

=== Confidence ===
In principle, the Chancellor is dependent on the confidence of Parliament, which is bestowed upon him with the election. The Bundestag can also withdraw its confidence in the Chancellor; however, this is only possible by means of a motion that simultaneously requests the president to appoint a new Chancellor proposed by name; the motion requires (as in an ordinary election of Chancellor) a majority of all members of the Bundestag in order to pass (Constructive vote of no confidence). Such a motion has been tabled twice so far and was successful only once:

Date	Proposed Candidate (Party)	Incumbent Chancellor (Party)	Yes-votes	No-votes	Abstentions	Absent / void	Necessary majority	Result
27 April 1972	Rainer Barzel (CDU)	Willy Brandt (SPD)	247	10	3	236	249	Motion failed
1 October 1982	Helmut Kohl (CDU)	Helmut Schmidt (SPD)	256	235	4	2	249	Motion successful

This is to be distinguished from a motion of confidence. This is a motion that only the Chancellor himself can submit to the Bundestag (optionally in conjunction with another motion or bill) to the effect that the Bundestag explicitly expresses its confidence in him (again). However, if the Chancellor loses the vote on this motion, this does not mean that he leaves office; rather, it gives him additional options for action: He can ask the president to dissolve the Bundestag and call a snap election or he can ask the federal president to declare a legislative emergency, allowing the government to bypass the Bundestag by passing laws with the approval of the Bundesrat instead. The legislative emergency is limited to six months after declaration and can only be declared once during the Bundeskanzler's term of office.

This apparent paradox is due to the fact that the motion of confidence is intended as an instrument of discipline for the chancellor vis-à-vis parliament or the factions supporting him: if the MPs fail to place their trust in him, they risk a new election or a (temporary and partial) disempowerment in the legislative process. In practice, however, the motion of confidence has also established itself as a means for the chancellor to deliberately trigger new elections by submitting the motion of confidence with the explicit goal of losing the vote and then requesting a dissolution of parliament. A total of six times a chancellor has submitted a motion of confidence to date; only twice was it a "genuine motion of confidence" (1982 and 2001), while in four cases the respective chancellor had the goal of triggering a snap election from the outset (1972, 1982, 2005, 2024).

=== Vice chancellor ===
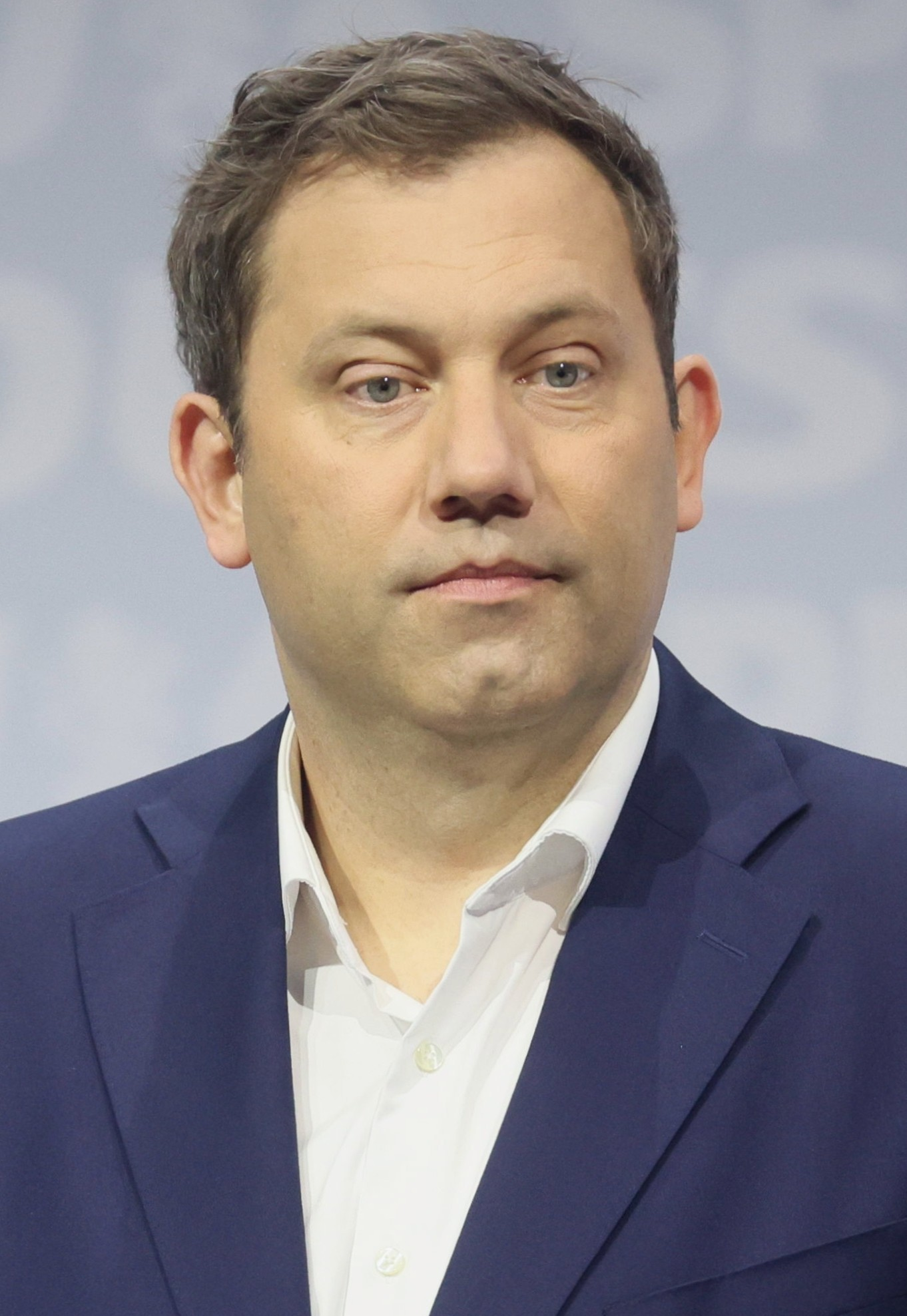
Lars Klingbeil, the current Vice Chancellor of Germany

The chancellor must appoint one of the cabinet ministers as vice chancellor (Article 69.1 Basic Law). The vice chancellor may deputise for the chancellor, if they are absent or unable to perform their duties. Although the chancellor is theoretically free to choose any cabinet minister, in coalition governments the leadership of the second biggest coalition party usually designates one of their ministers for the position, whom the chancellor appoints accordingly.

If the chancellor's term in office ends or if they resign, the Bundestag has to elect a new chancellor. The president of Germany may ask the former chancellor to act as chancellor until a new office holder is elected, but if they are unwilling or unable to do so, the president may also appoint the vice chancellor as acting chancellor. This has happened once: On 7 May 1974, Chancellor Willy Brandt resigned as a consequence of the Guillaume affair, an espionage scandal. In his letter of resignation to President Gustav Heinemann he requested, to be not asked to remain in office in an acting capacity and instead to appoint the vice chancellor as acting chancellor. President Heinemann followed the request. Vice Chancellor Walter Scheel was appointed acting chancellor and served for nine days until the election of Helmut Schmidt on 16 May 1974.

Scheel not taken into account, three persons, Ludwig Erhard, Willy Brandt, and Olaf Scholz, have held both the office of Vice Chancellor and that of Chancellor of Germany.

The current vice chancellor of Germany is Lars Klingbeil, who also serves as Minister of Finance in the Merz cabinet.

==== List of vice chancellors (1949–present) ====
Portrait	Name (Birth–Death)	Term of office		Political party	Cabinet	Portfolio
Portrait	Name (Birth–Death)	Term	Time in office	Political party	Cabinet	Portfolio
1	Franz Blücher (1896–1959)	20 September 1949 – 29 October 1957	8 years, 30 days	FDP	Adenauer I Adenauer II	Marshall Plan/Economic Cooperation
2	Ludwig Erhard (1897–1977)	29 October 1957 – 16 October 1963	5 years, 362 days	CDU	Adenauer III; Adenauer IV	Economic Affairs
3	Erich Mende (1916–1998)	17 October 1963 – 28 October 1966	3 years, 10 days	FDP	Erhard I Erhard II	Intra-German Relations
The office was vacant from 28 October to 8 November 1966.
4	Hans-Christoph Seebohm (1903–1967)	8 November 1966 – 1 December 1966	23 days	CDU	Erhard II	Transport
5	Willy Brandt (1913–1992)	1 December 1966 – 22 October 1969	2 years, 325 days	SPD	Kiesinger	Foreign Affairs
6	Walter Scheel (1919–2016)	22 October 1969 – 16 May 1974	4 years, 207 days	FDP	Brandt I Brandt II	Foreign Affairs
7	Hans-Dietrich Genscher (1927–2016); 1st term	17 May 1974 – 17 September 1982	8 years, 123 days	FDP	Schmidt I Schmidt II; Schmidt III	Foreign Affairs
8	Egon Franke (1913–1995)	17 September 1982 – 1 October 1982	14 days	SPD	Schmidt III	Intra-German Relations
The office was vacant from 1 October to 4 October 1982.
9	Hans-Dietrich Genscher (1927–2016); 2nd term	4 October 1982 – 18 May 1992	9 years, 230 days	FDP	Kohl I Kohl II; Kohl III; Kohl IV	Foreign Affairs
10	Jürgen Möllemann (1945–2003)	18 May 1992 – 21 January 1993	249 days	FDP	Kohl IV	Economic Affairs
11	Klaus Kinkel (1936–2019)	21 January 1993 – 27 October 1998	5 years, 279 days	FDP	Kohl IV; Kohl V	Foreign Affairs
12	Joschka Fischer (b. 1948)	27 October 1998 – 22 November 2005	7 years, 26 days	Alliance 90/The Greens	Schröder I Schröder II	Foreign Affairs
13	Franz Müntefering (b. 1940)	22 November 2005 – 21 November 2007	1 year, 364 days	SPD	Merkel I	Labour and Social Affairs
14	Frank-Walter Steinmeier (b. 1956)	21 November 2007 – 27 October 2009	1 year, 340 days	SPD	Merkel I	Foreign Affairs
15	Guido Westerwelle (1961–2016)	27 October 2009 – 16 May 2011	1 year, 201 days	FDP	Merkel II	Foreign Affairs
16	Philipp Rösler (b. 1973)	16 May 2011 – 17 December 2013	2 years, 215 days	FDP	Merkel II	Economic Affairs
17	Sigmar Gabriel (b. 1959)	17 December 2013 – 14 March 2018	4 years, 87 days	SPD	Merkel III	Economic Affairs (2013–2017); Foreign Affairs (2017–2018)
18	Olaf Scholz (b. 1958)	14 March 2018 – 8 December 2021	3 years, 269 days	SPD	Merkel IV	Finance
19	Robert Habeck (b. 1969)	8 December 2021 – 6 May 2025	3 years, 149 days	Alliance 90/The Greens	Scholz	Economic Affairs and Climate Protection
20	Lars Klingbeil (b. 1978)	6 May 2025 – Incumbent	1 year, 199 days	SPD	Merz	Finance

=== Official residence ===
Since 2001, the official seat of the chancellor is the Federal Chancellery in Berlin (Bundeskanzleramt). The former seat of the Federal Chancellery, the Palais Schaumburg in the former capital Bonn, now serves as a secondary official seat. The chancellor's country retreat is Schloss Meseberg in the state of Brandenburg.

The private lodging of the chancellors at Bonn has previously been the chancellor's bungalow built by Ludwig Erhard in the park of Palais Schaumburg, while his predecessor Konrad Adenauer used to live in his private house near Bonn. Under Adenauer, the government had also acquired a villa in Dahlem in 1962, a suburban district of southwestern Berlin, as a pied-a-terre of the chancellors in West-Berlin. Gerhard Schröder lived there between 1999 and 2001. Since 2004 it has however served as a private residence for the presidents of Germany. Angela Merkel preferred to live with her husband in her private apartment downtown.

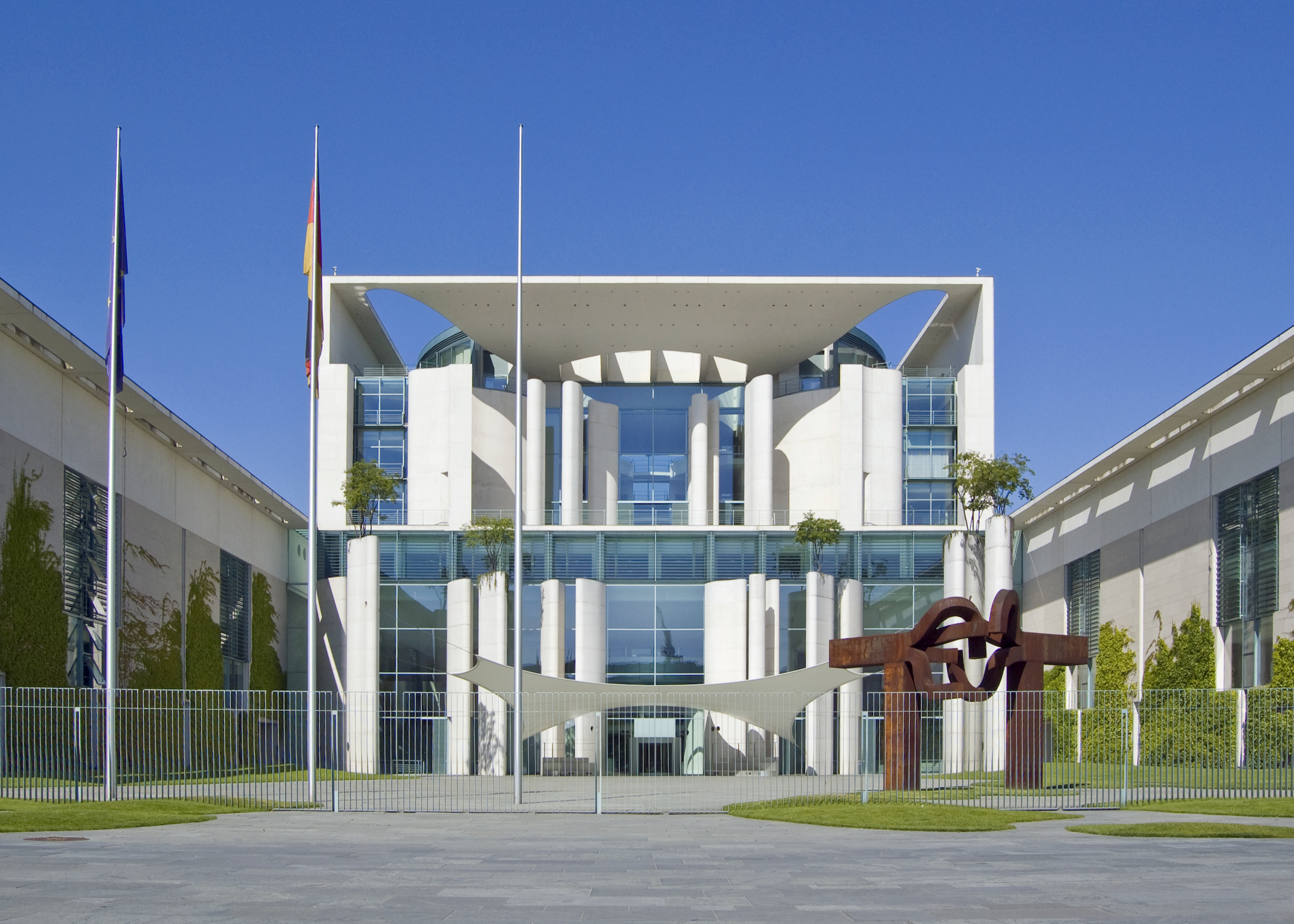
The Federal Chancellery, Berlin

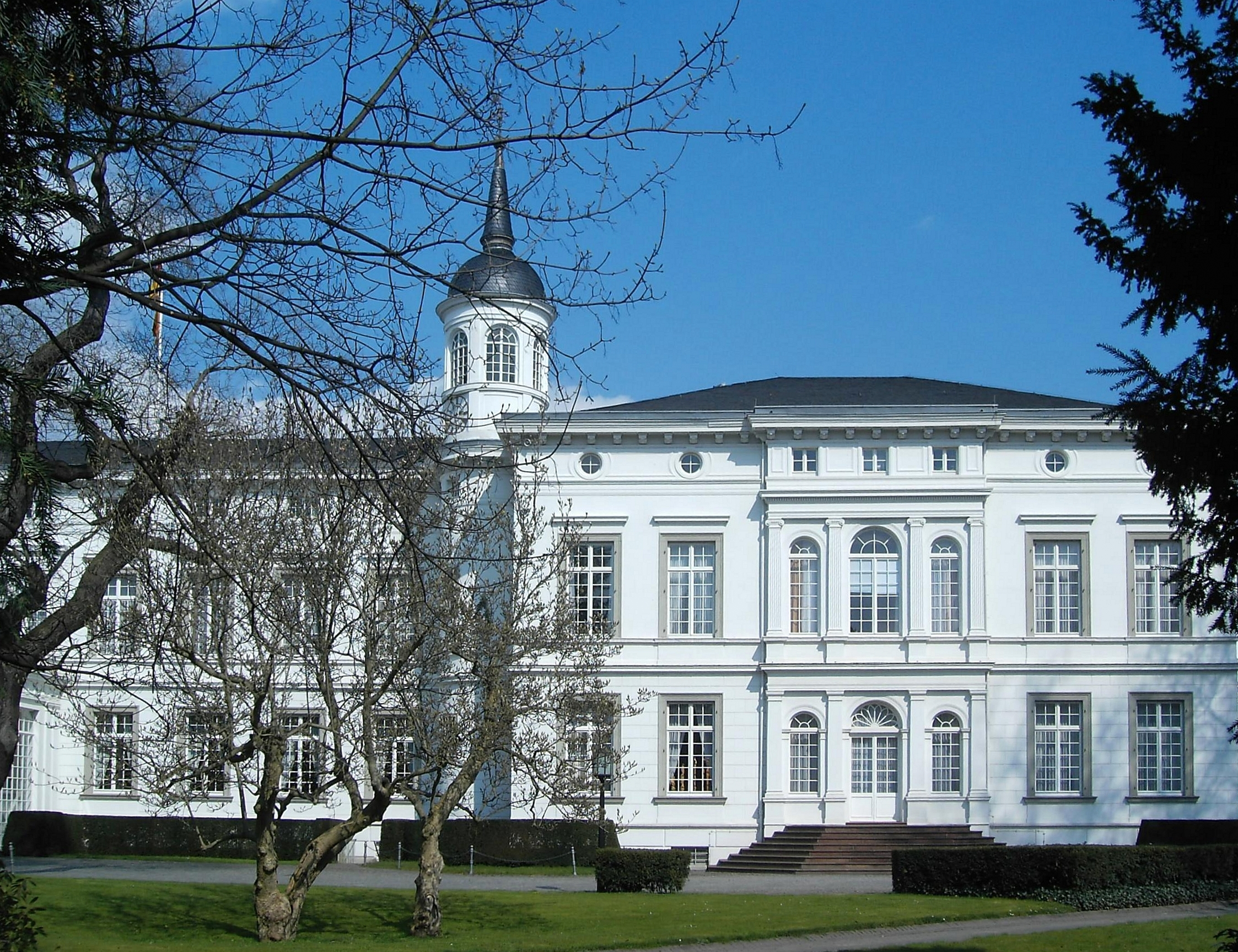
Palais Schaumburg, Bonn

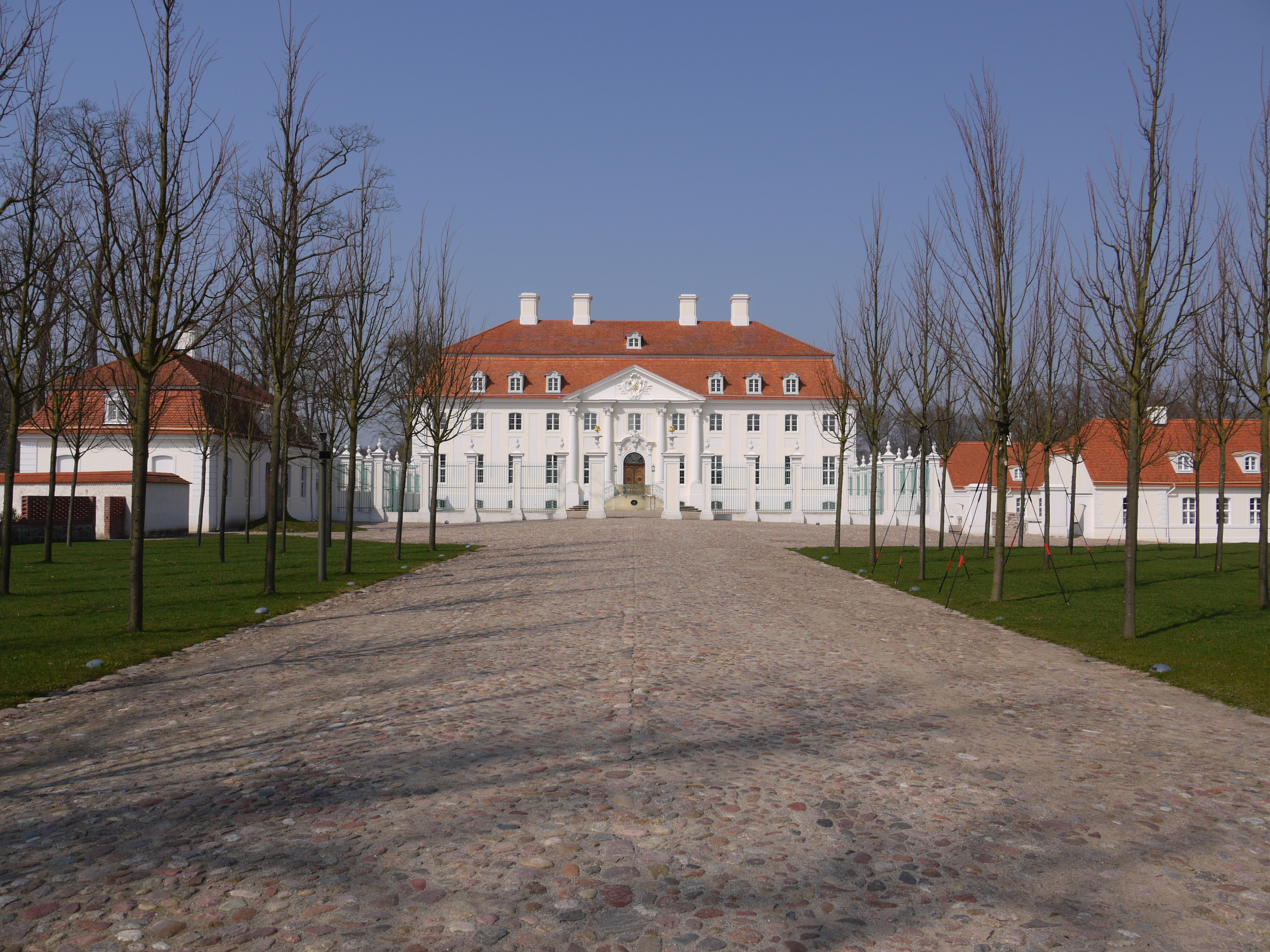
Schloss Meseberg, Gransee

=== Style of address ===
The correct style of address in German is Herr Bundeskanzler (male) or Frau Bundeskanzlerin (female). In international correspondence, the chancellor is referred to as "His/Her Excellency the Chancellor of the Federal Republic of Germany" ("Seine/Ihre Exzellenz der Bundeskanzler/die Bundeskanzlerin der Bundesrepublik Deutschland").

=== Salary ===
Holding the third-highest state office available within Germany, the chancellor of Germany receives €220,000 per annum and a €22,000 bonus, i.e. one and two thirds of Salary Grade B11 (according to § 11 (1) a of the Federal Law on Ministers – Bundesministergesetz, BGBl. 1971 I p. 1166 and attachment IV to the Federal Law on Salaries of Officers – Bundesbesoldungsgesetz, BGBl. 2002 I p. 3020)

=== Trivia ===
Chancellors have usually gained government experience (Regierungserfahrung) prior to their term in office; in other words, they have held government posts at either state or federal level.

- Ludwig Erhard was Bavaria State Minister for Economic Affairs (1945–1946) and Federal Minister for Economic Affairs (1949–1963)
- Kurt Georg Kiesinger was Minister-President of Baden-Württemberg (1958–1966)
- Willy Brandt was Governing Mayor of Berlin (1957–1966) and Federal Minister for Foreign Affairs (1966–1969)
- Helmut Schmidt was Senator for the Interior of Hamburg (1961–1965) and Federal Minister for Defence (1969–1972), Economic Affairs (1972), and Finance (1972–1974)
- Helmut Kohl was Minister-President of Rhineland-Palatinate (1969–1976)
- Gerhard Schröder was Minister-President of Lower Saxony (1990–1998)
- Angela Merkel was Federal Minister for Women’s Affairs (1991–1994) and the Environment (1994–1998)
- Olaf Scholz was Senator for the Interior (2001) and First Mayor of Hamburg (2011–2018), as well as Federal Minister for Labour and Social Affairs (2007–2009) and Finance (2018–2021)

The only exceptions are Konrad Adenauer and Friedrich Merz, who did not hold any government posts prior to their terms as Chancellor.

All previous Chancellors had parliamentary experience. Kiesinger was the only Chancellor to date who was not a member of the Bundestag during his term of office (1966–1969), although he had previously served in the Bundestag (1949–1958) and immediately afterwards (1969–1980). With the exception of Angela Merkel, all Federal Chancellors remained Members of the Bundestag even after the end of their term of office (although, in the case of Gerhard Schröder, this was only for two days following the election of his successor, before he resigned his seat).

The three chancellors with the longest terms in office were:

- Helmut Kohl (1982–1998; 16 years, 26 days)
- Angela Merkel (2005–2021; 16 years, 16 days)
- Konrad Adenauer (1949–1963; 14 years, 31 days)

The three chancellors with the shortest terms in office were:

- Kurt Georg Kiesinger (1966–1969; 2 years, 324 days)
- Ludwig Erhard (1963–1966; 3 years, 46 days)
- Olaf Scholz (2021–2025; 3 years, 149 days)

== See also ==
- President of Germany – Head of state
- Vice-Chancellor of Germany
- Leadership of East Germany
- List of chancellors of Germany by time in office
- Religious affiliations of chancellors of Germany
