= Gustav Freiherr von Gemmingen-Hornberg =

German politician

Member of the Bundestag
- In office 11 October 1967 – 19 October 1969

Personal details
- Born: 7 April 1925 Darmstadt
- Died: 30 January 2005 (aged 79)
- Party: FDP

Gustav Freiherr von Gemmingen-Hornberg (7 December 1925 – 30 January 2005) was a German politician of the Free Democratic Party (FDP) and former member of the German Bundestag.

== Life ==
Gemmingen-Hornberg was a member of the German Bundestag from 11 October 1967, when he succeeded Hans Lenz, who had left the parliament, until 1969. He had entered parliament via the Baden-Württemberg state list. In the Bundestag he was deputy chairman of the Development Aid Committee.

== Literature ==
Herbst, Ludolf; Jahn, Bruno (2002). Vierhaus, Rudolf (ed.). Biographisches Handbuch der Mitglieder des Deutschen Bundestages. 1949–2002 [Biographical Handbook of the Members of the German Bundestag. 1949–2002] (in German). München: De Gruyter - De Gruyter Saur. p. 1715. ISBN 978-3-11-184511-1.
