= Federal Ministry of the Treasury =

The Federal Ministry of the Treasury (German: Bundesschatzministerium) was a ministry of the Federal Republic of Germany charged with overseeing the economic possessions of the Federal government.

It was founded in 1957 as the Federal Ministry of Federal Patrimony (German: Bundesministerium für wirtschaftlichen Besitz des Bundes) to replace the earlier Ministry for Economic Cooperation.

In 1961, under the auspices of minister Hans Lenz, it was renamed Federal Ministry for the Treasury.

In 1969, the ministry was dissolved and its functions transferred to the ministries of Finance and Economics.

== List of ministers ==
Political party: CDU CSU FDP

Name (Born-Died)	Portrait	Party	Term of office		Chancellor (Cabinet)
Federal Minister for the Federal Patrimony
Hermann Lindrath (1896–1960)		CDU	29 October 1957	27 February 1960	Adenauer (III)
Hans Wilhelmi (1899–1970)		CDU	4 May 1960	14 November 1961	Adenauer (III)
Federal Treasury Minister
Hans Lenz (1907–1968)		FDP	14 November 1961	19 November 1962	Adenauer (IV)
Werner Dollinger (1918–2008)		CSU	13 December 1962	1 December 1966	Adenauer (V); Erhard (I • II)
Kurt Schmücker (1919–1996)		CDU	1 December 1966	21 October 1969	Kiesinger (I)
