= Siegfried Balke =

German politician (1902–1984)

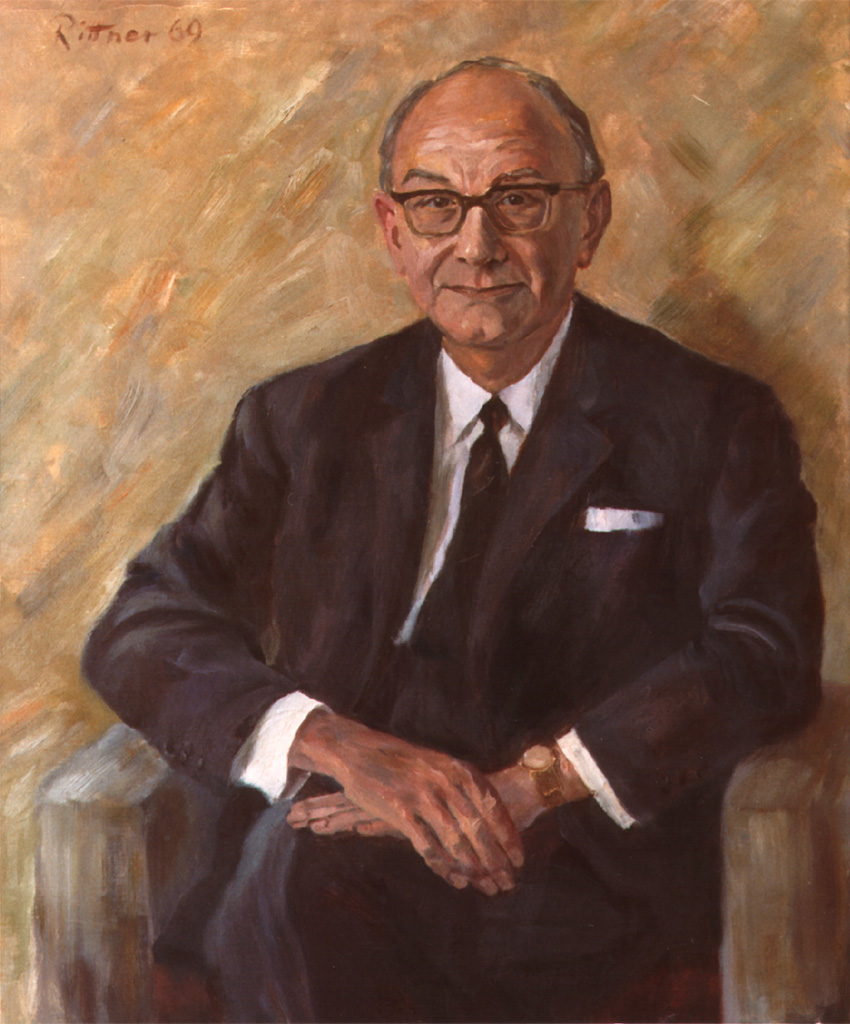
- Dr. Siegfried Balke, Portrait by Günter Rittner 1969. In the possession of the Confederation of German Employers' Associations

Minister for Atomic Energy (Note: Minister for Atomic Affairs (1955–1957), Minister for Atomic Energy and Water Management (1957–1961))
- In office 16 October 1956 – 14 December 1962
- Chancellor: Konrad Adenauer
- Preceded by: Franz Josef Strauss
- Succeeded by: Hans Lenz

Minister of Post and Telecommunications
- In office 10 December 1953 – 16 October 1956
- Chancellor: Konrad Adenauer
- Preceded by: Hans Schuberth
- Succeeded by: Ernst Lemmer

Member of the Bundestag; from Bavaria
- In office 15 October 1957 – 20 October 1969
- Preceded by: Otto Gumrum
- Succeeded by: Multi-member district
- Constituency: Munich North (1957–1965); State list (1965–1969)

Personal details
- Born: 1 June 1902 Bochum, Germany
- Died: 11 June 1984 (aged 82) Munich, West Germany
- Party: Christian Social Union
- Occupation: Chemist, politician

Siegfried Balke (1 June 1902 – 11 June 1984) was a German politician (CSU).

He served as German Federal Minister for Post and Communications from 1953 to 1956 and as German Federal Minister for Nuclear Energy from 1956 to 1962.

== Education and professional life ==
Balke was born in Bochum. He obtained his master's degree in chemistry in 1924, and a doctorate in chemistry in 1925. During the Nazi period, Balke, a Protestant Christian, was classified as a "half-Jew", which prevented him from pursuing an academic career in Germany. From 1925 to 1952, he worked for various chemical companies, until he became director of Wacker Chemie in 1952. A 50% stake of Wacker Chamie was held by the chemical conglomerate IG Farben until 1945, and then by Hoechst AG. After 1945, Balke was one of the few executives of the German chemical industry not stained by Nazi collaboration, which led to his chairmanship of the Association of the Bavarian Chemical Industry. He was an honorary professor for chemical processing at LMU Munich since 1956. After his resignation as Minister for Nuclear Energy, he was president of the Confederation of German Employers' Associations (BDA) from 1964 to 1969 and chairman of the Technical Monitoring Association (TÜV).

Balke was co-publisher of "Ullmann's Encyclopedia of Technical Chemistry" as well as the periodicals "Chemical Industry" and "Nuclear Economy" (all in German).

== Political career ==
From 1954, Balke was a member of the CSU, and from 1957 to 1969, Balke was a member of the German parliament (Bundestag).

In the federal elections of 1957 and 1961, Balke was elected to the German parliament as a direct representative of the Munich-North district, and in 1965 through the state list of Bavaria.

=== Public Offices ===
Following the German federal elections of 1953, he was appointed to serve as Federal Minister of Post and Communications in the cabinet of Konrad Adenauer based on a recommendation by the CSU party group. One aspect for his appointment was his Protestant faith, which allowed to preserve a denominational balance in the cabinet. On 16 October 1956, he became Federal Minister for Nuclear Energy. After the cabinet reshuffle following the Spiegel scandal, Balke was dismissed from the federal cabinet on 13 December 1962.

During Balke's term as Minister for Nuclear Energy, the German Electron Synchrotron (DESY) was founded, one of Germany's largest research centers for particle physics. While Balke's predecessor Franz Josef Strauß focused his interest on military nuclear technology, Balke was mostly interested in research for civilian purposes. In 1957, he publicly sided with the signers of the Göttingen Manifesto against arming the German military with tactical nuclear weapons. More than Strauß, and more than his successors, Balke was close to the interests of the nuclear industry. He was an advocate of an independent German nuclear industry.

Balke died in Munich.
