= Hans Wilhelmi =

German politician (1899–1970)

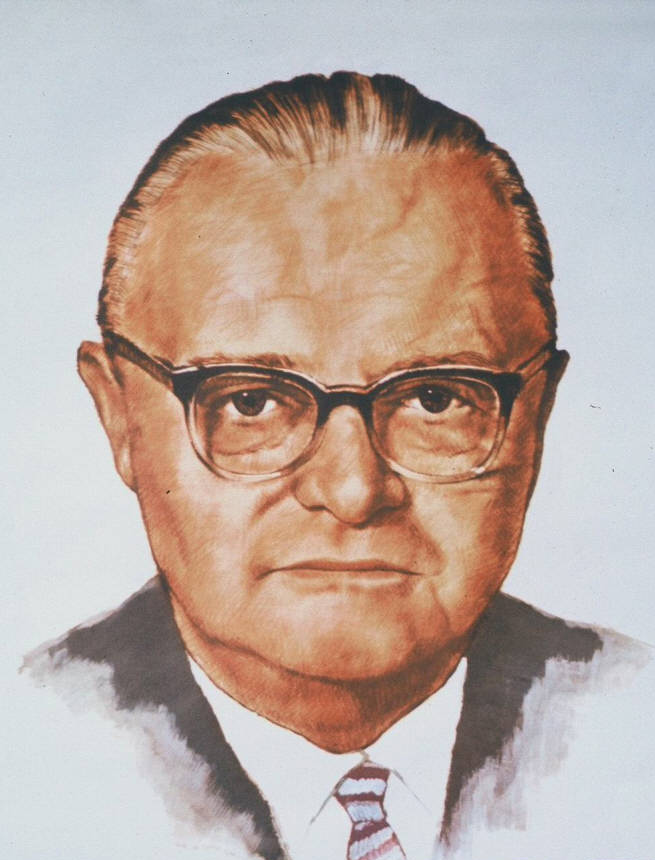

Hans Wilhelmi (27 August 1899 – 5 June 1970) was a German politician. A member of the Christian Democratic Union, he served in the Bundestag from 1957 to 1969. He was also Federal Minister for the Federal Patrimony from 1960 to 1961. He was born on 27 August 1899 in Mainz and died 5 June 1970 in Frankfurt am Main.
