= Ernst Lemmer =

German politician

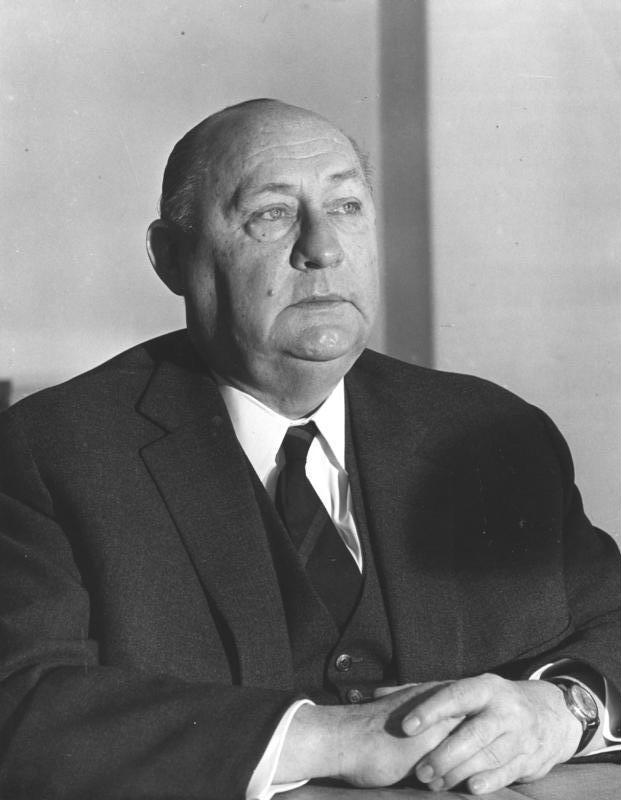
- Ernst Lemmer 1962

Federal Minister of Post and Telecommunications
- In office 15 November 1956 – 29 October 1957
- Preceded by: Siegfried Balke
- Succeeded by: Richard Stücklen

Member of the Bundestag
- In office 1 February 1952 – 18 August 1970

Personal details
- Born: 28 April 1898 Remscheid, German Empire
- Died: 16 August 1970 (aged 72) West Berlin, West Germany
- Party: CDU DDP
- Occupation: Politician, Legislator

Ernst Lemmer (28 April 1898 – 18 August 1970) was a German politician of the Christian Democratic Union (CDU) and former member of the German Bundestag.

== Life ==
He became a member of the German Democratic Party in 1918. During World War Two he was an international correspondent for Neue Züricher Zeitung and later Pester Lloyd. He was accused later, during his time as a correspondent, as being a propagator of Nazi policy abroad by Telegraf. However, a CIA report said he might have been part of the Lucy spy ring, although Walter Schellenberg also said he was a member of Amt VI.

Lemmer was a member of the German Bundestag from the increase in the number of Berlin delegates on 1 February 1952 until his death. He was also one of the co-founders of the CDU in June 1945. From 15 November 1956 to 29 October 1957 he was Federal Minister of Post and Telecommunications in Konrad Adenauer's second cabinet, and then Federal Minister for Pan-German Affairs from 29 October 1957 to 11 December 1962. From 19 February 1964 to 26 October 1965 he was in Ludwig Erhard's first cabinet as Federal Minister for Displaced Persons, Refugees and War-Affected Persons.

== Literature ==
Herbst, Ludolf; Jahn, Bruno (2002). Vierhaus, Rudolf (ed.). Biographisches Handbuch der Mitglieder des Deutschen Bundestages. 1949–2002 [Biographical Handbook of the Members of the German Bundestag. 1949–2002] (in German). München: De Gruyter - De Gruyter Saur. p. 1715. ISBN 978-3-11-184511-1.
