= Rolf Dahlgrün =

German politician (1908–1969)

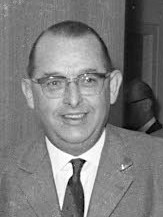
- Dahlgrün in 1965

Member of the Bundestag
- In office 15 October 1957 – 19 October 1969

Personal details
- Born: 19 May 1908 Hanover, Germany
- Died: 19 December 1969 (aged 61)
- Party: FDP

Rolf Dahlgrün (19 May 1908 – 19 December 1969) was a German politician of the Free Democratic Party (FDP). From 1962 to 1966, he was the Minister of Finance.

Dahlgrün studied law. He worked since 1936 for the Phönix Gummiwerke AG in Hamburg-Harburg.

Before 1945, Dahlgrün was a member of the Nazi Party. In 1949, he became a member of the FDP. From 1953 to 1957, he was a member of the Hamburgische Bürgerschaft. From 1957 to 1969, he was a member of the Bundestag. From 1962 to 1966, he was Minister of Finance.

Some weeks before he died, he was elected as chairman of the German chapter of World Wildlife Fund.

== See also ==
- List of German finance ministers
