= Walter Scheel =

President of Germany from 1974 to 1979

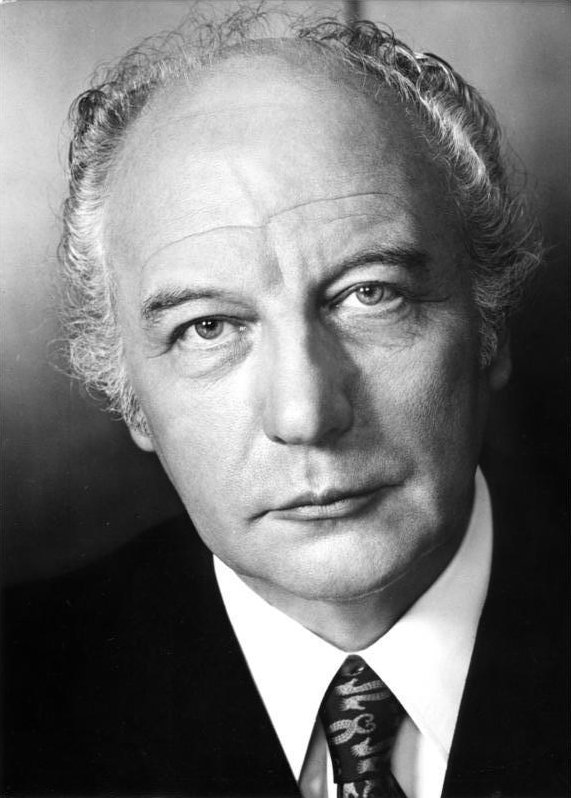
- Official portrait, 1974

President of Germany (Note: Due to the division of Germany, Walter Scheel was only the President of West Germany. The term West Germany is the common English name for the Federal Republic of Germany between its formation on 23 May 1949 and the German reunification through the accession of East Germany on 3 October 1990.)
- In office 1 July 1974 – 30 June 1979
- Chancellor: Helmut Schmidt
- Preceded by: Gustav Heinemann
- Succeeded by: Karl Carstens

Acting Chancellor of Germany (Note: Due to the division of Germany, Walter Scheel was only the chancellor in West Germany. The term West Germany is the common English name for the Federal Republic of Germany between its formation on 23 May 1949 and the German reunification through the accession of East Germany on 3 October 1990. The office of chancellor did not exist in East Germany.)
- In office 7 May 1974 – 16 May 1974
- President: Gustav Heinemann
- Deputy: Himself
- Preceded by: Willy Brandt
- Succeeded by: Helmut Schmidt

Vice Chancellor of Germany
- In office 22 October 1969 – 16 May 1974
- Chancellor: Willy Brandt; Himself (acting)
- Preceded by: Willy Brandt
- Succeeded by: Hans-Dietrich Genscher

Minister of Foreign Affairs
- In office 21 October 1969 – 16 May 1974
- Chancellor: Willy Brandt; Himself (acting)
- Preceded by: Willy Brandt
- Succeeded by: Hans-Dietrich Genscher

Vice President of the Bundestag (on proposal of the FDP group)
- In office 8 September 1967 – 19 October 1969
- President: Eugen Gerstenmaier; Kai-Uwe von Hassel
- Preceded by: Thomas Dehler
- Succeeded by: Liselotte Funcke

Minister for Economic Cooperation
- In office 14 November 1961 – 28 October 1966
- Chancellor: Konrad Adenauer; Ludwig Erhard
- Preceded by: Office established
- Succeeded by: Werner Dollinger
Parliamentary constituencies
Member of the Bundestag for North Rhine-Westphalia
In office 6 October 1953 – 27 June 1974
Preceded by	multi-member district
Succeeded by	Karl-Hans Laermann
Constituency	Free Democratic Party List
Member of the European Parliament for West Germany
In office 1 July 1956 – 20 November 1961
Preceded by	multi-member district
Succeeded by	multi-member district
Member of the Landtag of North Rhine-Westphalia for Remscheid
In office 5 July 1950 – 13 July 1954
Preceded by	Hugo Paul
Succeeded by	Walter Frey

Personal details
- Born: 8 July 1919 Höhscheid, Rhine Province, Free State of Prussia, Germany
- Died: 24 August 2016 (aged 97) Bad Krozingen, Baden-Württemberg, Germany
- Party: Free Democratic (1946–2016)
- Other political affiliations: Nazi (1942–1945)
- Spouses: Eva Charlotte Kronenberg (m. 1942; died 1966); Mildred Wirtz (m. 1969; died 1985); Barbara Wiese (m. 1988)
- Children: 4
- Occupation: Politician; Businessman; Consultant
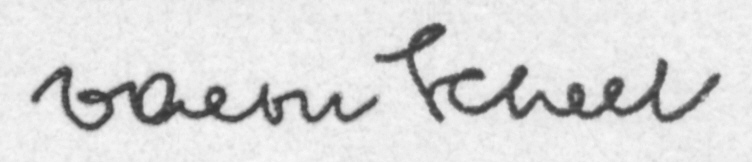
- Signature

Walter Scheel (German: [ˈvaltɐ ˈʃeːl]; 8 July 1919 – 24 August 2016) was a German statesman. A former member of the Nazi Party who joined the Free Democratic Party of Germany (FDP) in 1946, he first served in government as the Federal Minister of Economic Cooperation and Development from 1961 to 1966 and later as President of Germany from 1974 to 1979. He led the FDP from 1968 to 1974.

During the chancellorship of Willy Brandt, Scheel was Federal Minister of Foreign Affairs and the Vice Chancellor. Scheel became acting Chancellor of West Germany from 7–16 May 1974 following Brandt's resignation after the Guillaume Affair. He was elected shortly after as the president of West Germany, remaining in the role until 1979. Scheel was a member of the Protestant Church in Germany.

== Early life ==
Scheel was born in Solingen (now in North Rhine-Westphalia). He completed his Abitur at the Reformrealgymnsasium Schwertstraße.

Scheel became a member of the Nazi Party in 1942. During World War II, he served in the Luftwaffe during the last years of the war as a radar operator on a Bf 110 night fighter.

== Political career ==
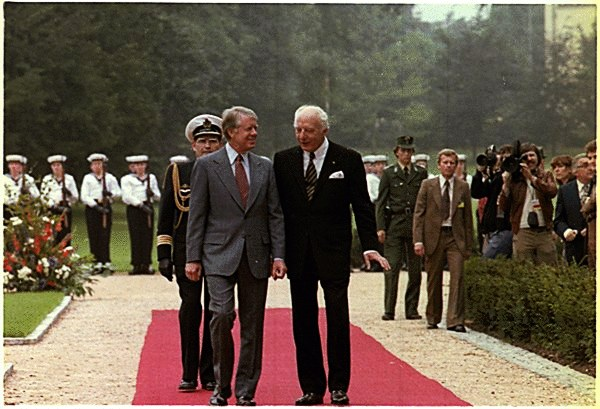
Scheel with U.S. President Jimmy Carter, 1978

When his Free Democratic Party reentered government in a coalition with Konrad Adenauer's Christian Democratic Union in 1961, Scheel was appointed federal minister of economic cooperation and development. He continued in that office under Chancellor Ludwig Erhard but brought about the downfall of the latter in late 1966 by resigning.

A Christian Democratic/Social Democratic Grand Coalition followed. During this time, in 1968, Scheel took over the party presidency from right wing liberal Erich Mende. According to one study, the election of Walter Scheel to the FDP leadership in 1968 "represented a turn to the left and the Free Democrats then indicated their wooing of the SPD by voting for the successful Social Democratic candidate for the Presidency of the Republic, Gustav Heinemann, in 1969."

In 1969, he led his party to form a new coalition with the Social Democrats. Under Chancellor Willy Brandt, Scheel became Foreign Minister and Vice Chancellor. Under their leadership, West Germany pursued a course of rapprochement and détente with the Soviet bloc and officially recognized the existence of the German Democratic Republic (GDR). This policy caused a massive public debate, with various Free and Social Democrats switching sides to the opposition. Though an attempt to oust Brandt failed, the coalition had lost its slender majority. The parliamentary stalemate was ended by the dissolution of parliament and early elections in 1972, which brought great gains for the Social Democrats and enabled the coalition to continue.

On 7 May 1974, Brandt resigned as chancellor after one of his aides, Günter Guillaume, was arrested as a spy for the East German state. Though this had been internally suspected since 1973, Brandt accepted responsibility and resigned. Scheel, as acting chancellor, chaired the government meetings for a little over a week, until Helmut Schmidt was elected. One of his first official acts as acting Chancellor was the award of the war blind radio play prize to Alfred Behrens on 8 May 1974. On 14 May, he chaired the cabinet meeting once. Hans Dietrich Genscher became Scheel's successor as party chairman and as minister.

Scheel was elected President of West Germany, a week after relinquishing his other government roles. He held the office from July 1974 until June 1979. At the funeral of Hanns Martin Schleyer in October 1977, Scheel gave a speech entitled shame. After the federal presidency, Scheel was Chairman of the Bilderberg Conference as well as President of the European Movement in Germany from 1980 to 1985. From 1980 to 1989, he was also President of the German section of the Union of European Federalists (UEF). He was named honorary chairman of the Friedrich Naumann Foundation in 1991.

== Death ==
Scheel died on 24 August 2016 following a long illness. Having lived to 97 years, 47 days he holds the record as the longest-lived German head of state, either imperial or elected.

== Publications ==
- with Karl-Hermann Flach and Werner Maihofer: Die Freiburger Thesen der Liberalen, Rowohlt, Hamburg 1972 ISBN 3-499-11545-X.
- Die Zukunft der Freiheit – Vom Denken und Handeln in unserer Demokratie, Econ, 1979.
- Wen schmerzt noch Deutschlands Teilung? 2 Reden zum 17. Juni, Rowohlt, Reinbek 1986 ISBN 3-499-18346-3.
- with Otto Graf Lambsdorff: Freiheit in Verantwortung, Deutscher Liberalismus seit 1945, Bleicher, 1988 ISBN 3-88350-047-X.
- with Jürgen Engert: Erinnerungen und Einsichten, Hohenheim-Verlag, Stuttgart 2004 ISBN 3-89850-115-9.
- with Tobias Thalhammer: Gemeinsam sind wir stärker – Zwölf erfreuliche Geschichten über Jung und Alt, Allpart Media, Berlin 2010 ISBN 978-3-86214-011-4.

== Literature ==
- Hans-Dietrich Genscher (Hrsg.): Heiterkeit und Härte: Walter Scheel in seinen Reden und im Urteil von Zeitgenossen, Deutsche Verlagsanstalt, Stuttgart 1984 ISBN 3-421-06218-8.
- Hans-Roderich Schneider: Präsident des Ausgleichs. Bundespräsident Walter Scheel. Ein liberaler Politiker, Verlag Bonn aktuell, Stuttgart 1975 ISBN 3-87959-045-1.

== Notes ==
Political offices
Preceded by Willy Brandt	Vice-Chancellor of West Germany; 1969–1974	Succeeded by Hans-Dietrich Genscher
Preceded by Willy Brandt	Foreign Minister of West Germany; 1969–1974	Succeeded by Hans-Dietrich Genscher
Preceded by Gustav Heinemann	President of West Germany; 1974–1979	Succeeded by Karl Carstens
