= Paul Lücke =

German politician (1914–1976)

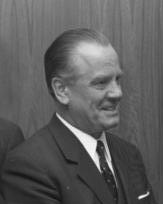
- Paul Lücke in 1966

Federal Minister of the Interior
- In office 26 October 1965 – 2 April 1968
- Preceded by: Hermann Höcherl
- Succeeded by: Ernst Benda

Member of the Bundestag
- In office 7 September 1949 – 22 September 1972

Personal details
- Born: 13 November 1914 Schönborn, Rhine Province, German Empire
- Died: 10 August 1976 (aged 61) Erlangen, West Germany
- Party: Christian Democratic Union
- Profession: Civil servant

Paul Lücke (13 November 1914 – 10 August 1976) was a German politician and civil servant. He served as West Germany's Federal Minister of the Interior from 1965 to 1968.

Lücke was a member of the Christian Democratic Union since the party's foundation in 1945. In the 1949 election, he gained a seat in the inaugural Bundestag, which he held until 1972. Following the 1965 election, Lücke was appointed Minister of the Interior by Ludwig Erhard.
