= Erich Mende =

German politician (1916–1998)

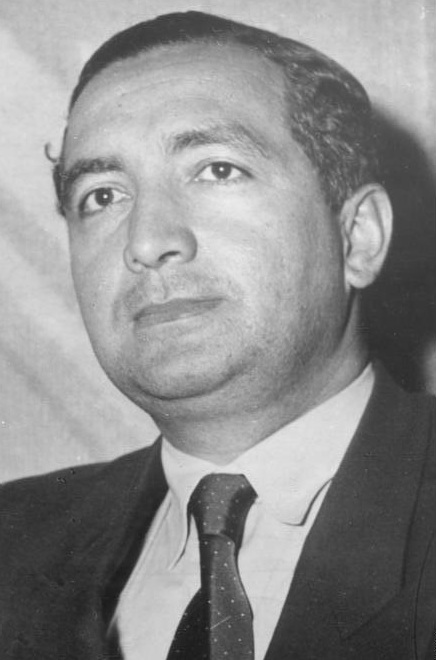
- Mende in 1961

Vice Chancellor of Germany West Germany
- In office 17 October 1963 – 28 October 1966
- President: Heinrich Lübke
- Chancellor: Ludwig Erhard
- Preceded by: Ludwig Erhard
- Succeeded by: Hans-Christoph Seebohm

Federal Minister of All-German Affairs
- In office 17 October 1963 – 28 October 1966
- Chancellor: Ludwig Erhard
- Preceded by: Rainer Barzel
- Succeeded by: Johann Baptist Gradl

Member of the Bundestag
- In office 7 September 1949 – 4 November 1980

Personal details
- Born: 28 October 1916 Groß Strehlitz, Kingdom of Prussia, Germany
- Died: 6 May 1998 (aged 81) Bonn, Germany
- Party: FDP; CDU (from 1970)
- Education: University of Cologne, University of Bonn
- Occupation: Soldier, politician
- Awards: Knight's Cross of the Iron Cross

Erich Mende (28 October 1916 – 6 May 1998) was a German politician of the Free Democratic Party (FDP) and Christian Democratic Union (CDU). He was the leader of FDP from 1960 to 1968 and the vice chancellor of Germany from 1963 to 1966.

== Early life ==
Mende was born on 28 October 1916 in Groß Strehlitz, in the Province of Silesia, a province in the Kingdom of Prussia. Today it is Strzelce Opolskie, part of Opole Voivodeship in Poland. He was the third of four children of Max Mende (1885–1943) and his wife Anna (1889–1968), née Krawietz, of Polish descent. He had a seven-year-older brother Walter and a five-year-older sister Amalie. (Note: Walter, as an officer in the Luftwaffe, was killed in action in France.) His father was the director of a secondary school (Volksschule) and, as was usual among Catholics, a supporter of the Centre Party. He grew up in region of Silesia heavily fought over during the Silesian Uprisings of 1919 to 1921 that culminated in the Battle of Annaberg (21–26 May 1921). He also experienced the Upper Silesia occupation by British, French and Italian forces, and being governed by an Inter-Allied Committee headed by a French general, Henri Le Rond.

On graduating from the Königliches Johanneum Gymnasium in Groß Strehlitz in 1936 he decided to become a professional soldier and enlisted in the Wehrmacht's 84th Infantry Regiment, then subordinated to the 8th Infantry Division, at Gleiwitz, on the German-Polish frontier.

== Military career ==
As a lieutenant of infantry he was badly wounded on the third day of the German invasion of Poland in 1939. He was wounded on two further occasions. In January 1945 as a major, he was awarded the Knight's Cross of the Iron Cross (Ritterkreuz des Eisernen Kreuzes) for holding the front and thereby helping 10,000 East Prussian civilians and wounded escape the advancing Red Army. A little later he managed to get the survivors of the Silesian 102. Infanterie-Division (102nd Infantry Division), about 4,000 men, to the relative safety of being prisoners of war of the British.

According to his own account, Mende shared a very trusted relationship with the commanding general of the 102nd Infantry Division, Werner von Bercken. In April 1944, Von Bercken introduced him to Generalmajor Henning von Tresckow, who organized the German resistance against Adolf Hitler. In this brief meeting Von Bercken encouraged Mende to openly share his pessimistic view on the outcome of the war. In this account, Mende expressed to Von Bercken and Von Tresckow his view that the German leadership needed to find a political solution, negotiating peace, since the war could not be won by military means.

== Political career ==
On his release from British custody, Mende took up the study of law and political science at Cologne University, gaining his doctorate in 1949. He also helped to found the Free Democratic Party (FDP) in 1945.

His party was the most freemarket-orientated of the three main German parties. Mende was elected to the Bundestag in 1949 and rose swiftly through the ranks of his party. By 1960 he was national chairman of FDP. He held this post until 1968.

As a member of parliament Mende worked tirelessly on behalf of former soldiers, those who were released after lengthy captivity (the so-called Spätheimkehrer), and those condemned as war criminals. He took a rather conservative, traditionalist view of how the new German armed forces, the Bundeswehr, should be structured and trained.

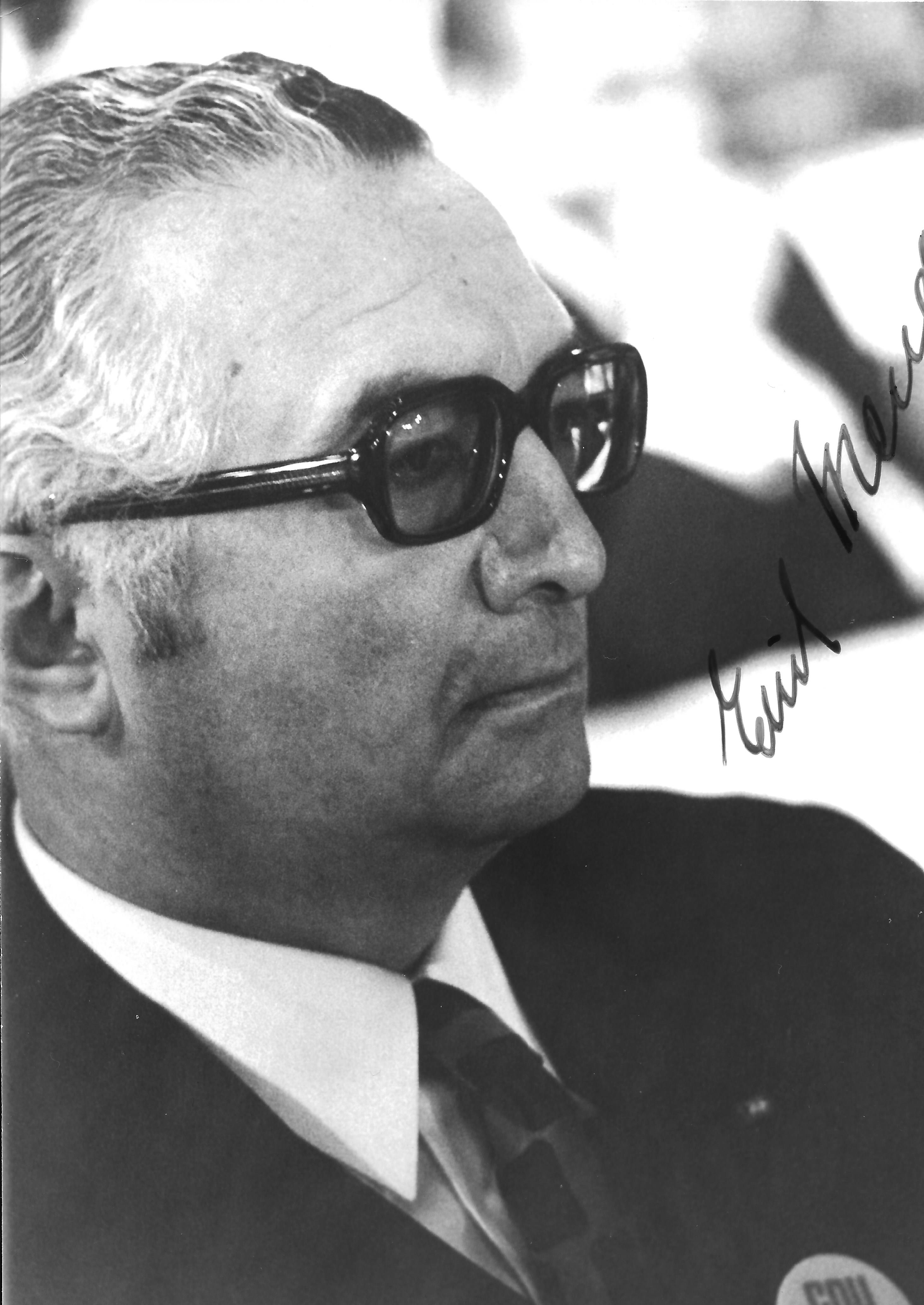
Mende in 1971

He was something of a thorn in Konrad Adenauer's side. Adenauer's Christian Democrats were the main government party with which the FDP was in coalition. After the FDP increased its vote in September 1961, in the wake of the building of the Berlin Wall in August 1961, Mende urged his party not to join Adenauer in another coalition. The FDP did not take his advice. He refused to take office, only changing his position once Ludwig Erhard had replaced Adenauer as Chancellor in 1963.

Under Erhard Mende served as Vice-Chancellor (deputy head of government) and Minister for All-German Affairs. His task was to promote relations with Communist East Germany, the German Democratic Republic, not then recognised by the West Germans. During his period of office West Berliners were permitted, for the first time, to cross the Wall for Christmas visits in December 1963. From 1964, East German senior citizens were allowed to visit West Germany.

Mende inaugurated agreements on road building, especially on the autobahn near Hof to facilitate better communications with West Berlin. Also during his time in office over 4,000 political prisoners held in East German prisons were "bought free" by West Germany.

The FDP lost office in 1966 with the fall of Erhard. His successor at the head of the Christian Democrats, Kurt Georg Kiesinger, decided on a coalition with the main opposition party, the Social Democrats of Willy Brandt. In opposition Mende turned his attention to his finances and worked as representative of the American international investment bank, IOS. His party veered to the left and he was replaced in January 1968 by Walter Scheel. He left the Bundestag in 1969.

In the following year the FDP became the junior partner in Brandt's SPD-FDP coalition. In protest against Brandt's new Ostpolitik and the recognition of the Oder–Neisse line Mende left the FDP in 1970 and joined the Christian Democrats in opposition. His defection did not have much impact on the coalition or his party's fortunes. He served in the Bundestag again as a CDU Member from 1972 through 1980, but failed to make much impact in the ranks of the Christian Democrats.

== Personal life ==
Erich Mende was married twice. His second wife, the young war widow Margot Hansen, he met in 1947 at an FDP meeting. They married a year later. Margot Mende played an active role in her husband's career. His son Walter Mende (born 14 July 1944 in Oels) was the Oberbürgermeister (Lord Mayor) of Leverkusen from 1994 to 1999.

== Awards ==
- German Cross in Gold on 30 May 1942 as Oberleutnant in the 10./Infanterie-Regiment 84
- Knight's Cross of the Iron Cross on 28 February 1945 as Major and leader of Grenadier-Regiment 216
- Great Cross of Merit

== Notes ==
Government offices
Preceded by Ludwig Erhard	Vice Chancellor of Germany; 1963 – 1966	Succeeded by Hans-Christoph Seebohm
