= Elections in Berlin =

German city elections

All Berlin residents who are 16 years and older, hold EU citizenship, have lived there for three months and were registered six weeks before the election are eligible to vote for the districts' assemblies. In order to be eligible to vote for the parliament of Berlin (Abgeordnetenhaus), one has to be 18 years old and hold German citizenship, too. Only those under disability or in psychiatric wards are excluded. Courts of justice also have the possibility to revoke the right to vote.

Elections are held about every five years. The Senate of Berlin decides the exact date of the election for the Abgeordnetenhaus, which is usually the same as for the assemblies of the twelve districts of Berlin. The last state election was held on 12 February 2023.

== Elections to the Abgeordnetenhaus ==
The first general, direct and democratic elections to the Abgeordnetenhaus were held in West Berlin on 3 December 1950. On 2 December 1990 the first Abgeordnetenhaus election for all Berlin was held. Since 1979, voters have had two votes: one for a deputy from the 78 constituencies and one for a list, usually a political party. Hence the Abgeordnetenhaus has a minimum of 130 seats, but usually more seats are won. Originally the d'Hondt method was used, but since 1979 the Hare-Niemeyer method is used to determine the number of seats for lists.

=== Dates of elections to the Abgeordnetenhaus ===
- 3 December 1950
- 5 December 1954
- 7 December 1958
- 17 February 1963
- 12 March 1967
- 14 March 1971
- 2 March 1975
- 18 March 1979
- 10 May 1981
- 10 March 1985
- 29 January 1989
- 2 December 1990
- 22 October 1995
- 10 October 1999
- 21 October 2001
- 17 September 2006
- 18 September 2011
- 18 September 2016
- 26 September 2021
- 12 February 2023
- 20 September 2026

== Constituencies and voting districts (as of 24 September 2010) ==
Constituencies and voting districts
Nr.	Voting district	Number of constituencies	Change to 2006 state elections
1	Mitte	6	
2	Friedrichshain-Kreuzberg	6	+1
3	Pankow	9	
4	Charlottenburg-Wilmersdorf	7	
5	Spandau	5	
6	Steglitz-Zehlendorf	7	
7	Tempelhof-Schöneberg	8	
8	Neukölln	6	
9	Treptow-Köpenick	6	
10	Marzahn-Hellersdorf	6	-1
11	Lichtenberg	6	
12	Reinickendorf	6	

Within the voting districts the constituencies are numbered consecutively. The constituencies for elections to the House of Deputies (Abgeordnetenhaus) are the same as for the District Assemblies (Bezirksverordnetenversammlungen). Whereas the voting districts are roughly equivalent to the constituencies for the elections to the Federal Diet (Bundestag).

== See also ==
- 2013 Berlin energy referendum
- 2021 Berlin referendum
