= Socialist Unity Party of West Berlin =

Political party in West Berlin

Socialist Unity Party of West Berlin (Note: From April 1990 to June 1991 as Sozialistische Initiative (Socialist Initiative).) Sozialistische Einheitspartei Westberlins
- Leader: Horst Schmitt (last)
- Founded: 24 November 1962
- Dissolved: June 1991
- Split from: SED
- Newspaper: Die Wahrheit
- Youth wing: Socialist Youth League Karl Liebknecht
- Ideology: Communism; Marxism–Leninism
- Political position: Far-left
- Colors: Red

Party flag

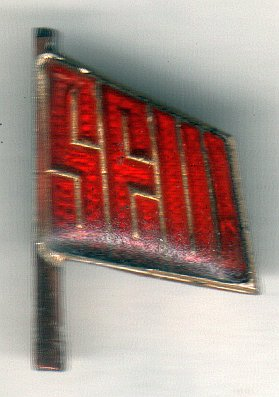
Insignia of the SEW

The Socialist Unity Party of West Berlin (German: Sozialistische Einheitspartei Westberlins, SEW) was a Marxist-Leninist party in West Berlin. The party was founded on 24 November 1962, when the West Berlin local organization of the Socialist Unity Party of Germany (SED) was separated from the main party. Until 1969, the party was known as the Socialist Unity Party of Germany – West Berlin (Sozialistische Einheitspartei Deutschlands – Westberlin). Gerhard Danelius was the chairman of the party until 1978.

In many respects, the party continued to operate as a branch of the SED even after it had formally been converted into a separate political party. The leading functionaries visited the GDR and were constantly in contact with the SED authorities, especially with the Westabteilung ('Western Department') of the East German ruling party responsible for contacts with organizations in the West. The party's newspaper Die Wahrheit ('The Truth') had 8,500 subscribers in 1968; the number had decreased to 4,500 by the end of the 1980s. Nevertheless, the circulation was 15,000 (in 1989), with just a fraction (around 4,000) of this actually sold in West Berlin, as most of the papers were simply distributed free of charge to socialist countries. Because the newspaper was heavily subsidized by the East German government, the line of the paper was more or less determined by the East German authorities.

Similarly, the party's subordination to the SED went so far that its election manifesto, though being already officially accepted by the board of the party, was submitted to Erich Honecker for revisions, who indeed made a number of corrections to the version that had already been agreed upon and established as definitive. Nevertheless, some documents of the SED functionaries reveal that in the 1970s, when the SEW was led by Danelius, they regarded the cooperation with the German Communist Party (DKP) as more close than with the SEW. After Danelius died and was replaced by Horst Schmitt (in 1978), the new leader attached the party even closer to the SED.

The party operated on the basis of democratic centralism, which meant that dissident members had no way to advance their opinions within the party, and were regularly expelled. In 1980, a faction close to Eurocommunist and alternative left positions surfaced (often referred to as the Klarheit faction after the paper they published), but the leadership managed to suppress dissidence within the party by purging the leading oppositionists from the SEW. The party leader Schmitt explained to the leadership that expelling "30 or 35 bandits is a necessary process of cleaning up."

Gorbachev's rise to power in the Soviet Union and the consequent reform policies of perestroika and glasnost affected the German Marxist–Leninist organizations. In the SEW, a rift developed between more liberal individual members, who appreciated Gorbachev's policies as a chance to revive leftist movements in Europe on one hand, and the leadership that chose to ignore the reforms in the USSR, as did their mentors in East Germany.

At the time of German reunification, the SEW was first renamed as Socialist Initiative (Sozialistische Initiative), then disbanded in 1991. Most of the activists who wished to stay involved in politics joined the Party of Democratic Socialism.

The youth league of the SEW was known as the Socialist Youth League Karl Liebknecht.

== Electoral results to the Abgeordnetenhaus (House of Representatives) of West Berlin ==
The party never achieved representation in the Abgeordnetenhaus. Its highest election result in terms of both raw votes and percentage was the first election it ran in, 1954, where it received 41,375 votes (2.7%). It regularly received 2% or more of the vote until the 1970s before steadily declining, posting its worst result in the 1989 election.

- 1954 – 41,375 (2.7%, as SED)
- 1958 – 31,572 (2.0%, as SED)
- 1963 – 20,929 (1.4%)
- 1967 – 29,925 (2.0%)
- 1971 – 33,845 (2.3%)
- 1975 – 25,105 (1.8%)
- 1979 – 13,744 (1.1%)
- 1981 – 8,176 (0.6%)
- 1985 – 7,731 (0.6%)
- 1989 – 6,875 (0.6%)

== Notes and references ==
=== Sources ===
- Niederstadt, Jenny (1999). "Erbitten Anweisung!" Die West-Berliner SEW und ihre Tageszeitung "Die Wahrheit" auf SED-Kurs ["Instructions Requested!": The West Berlin SEW and Their Daily Newspaper "Die Wahrheit" on the SED Party Line] (PDF) (in German). Stasi Records Agency. ISBN 9783934085022. Archived from the original (PDF) on 14 July 2010.
- Kleps, Erhard, ed. (2016). "Abkürzungen: S (SEW)" [Abbreviations: S (SEW)]. DDR 1989/90 (in German).
