= 1969 West German federal election =

- 28 September 1969

All 496 seats in the Bundestag (Note: As well as the 22 non-voting delegates for West Berlin, elected by the West Berlin Legislature.) 249 seats needed for a majority
- Registered: 38,677,235 ▲0.4%
- Turnout: 33,523,064 (86.7%) ▼0.1pp
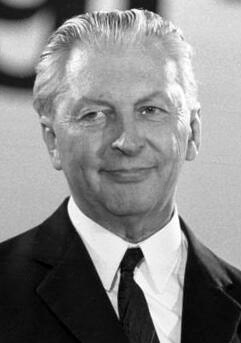

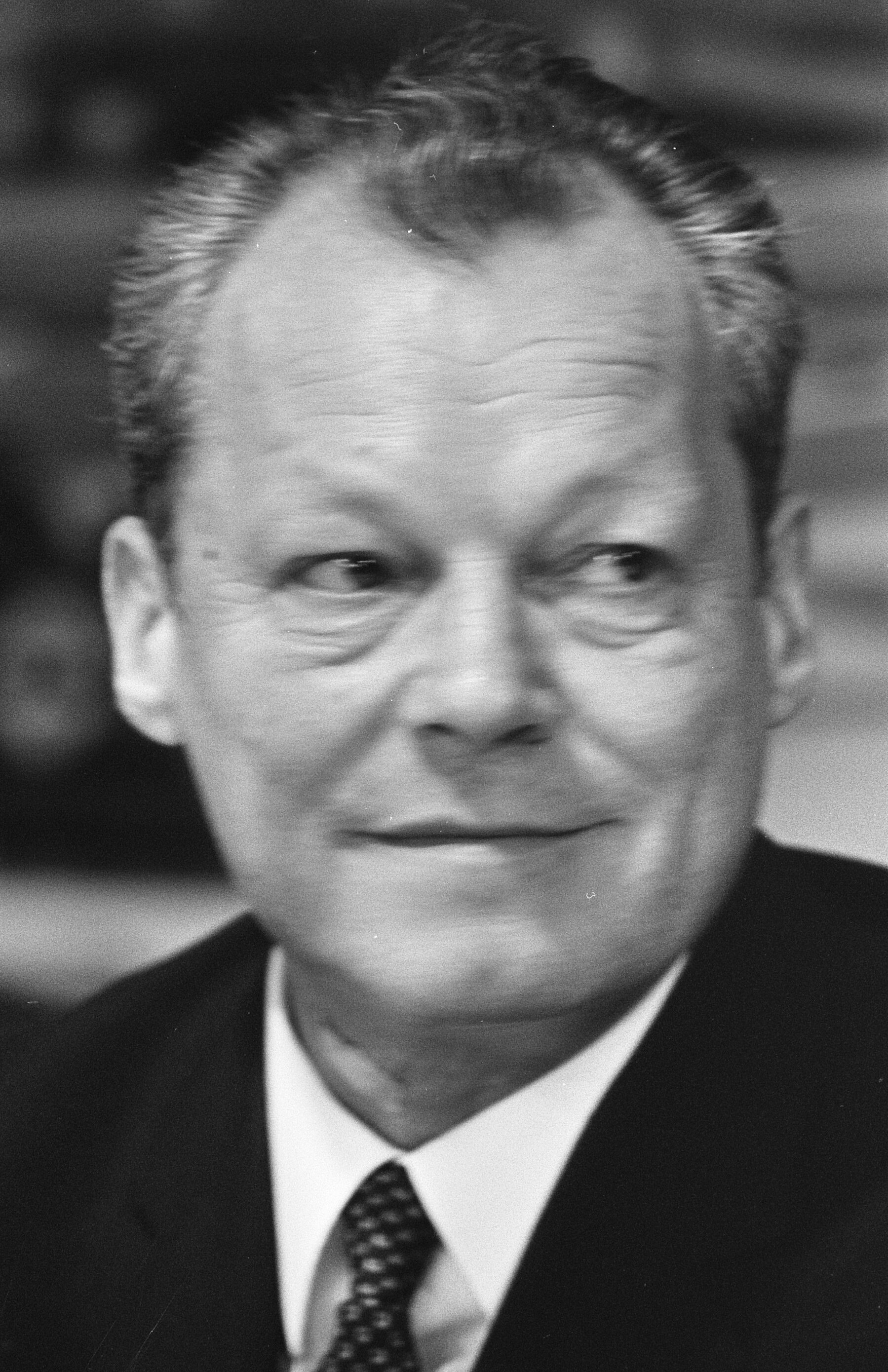

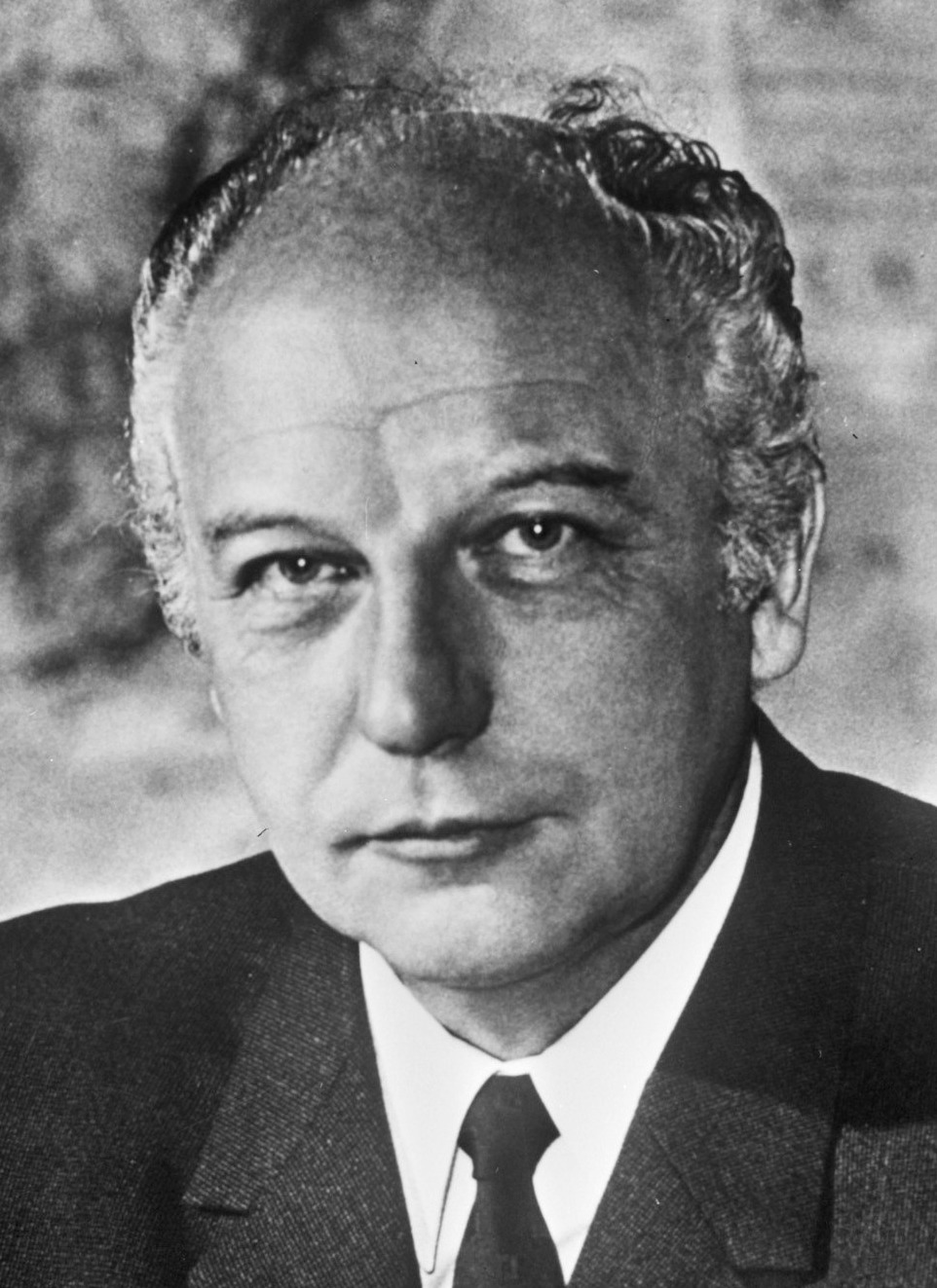
	First party	Second party	Third party
Leader	Kurt Georg Kiesinger	Willy Brandt	Walter Scheel
Party	CDU/CSU	SPD	FDP
Last election	47.6%, 245 seats	39.3%, 202 seats	9.5%, 49 seats
Seats won	242 (Note: As well as 8 non-voting delegates for West Berlin.)	224 (Note: As well as 13 non-voting delegates for West Berlin.)	30 (Note: As well as 1 non-voting delegate for West Berlin.)
Seat change	▼3	▲22	▼19
Popular vote	15,195,187	14,065,716	1,903,422
Percentage	46.1%	42.7%	5.8%
Swing	▼1.5 pp	▲3.4 pp	▼3.7 pp
- The left side shows constituency winners of the election by their party colours. The right side shows party list winners of the election for the additional members by their party colours.
Government before election
Kiesinger cabinet
CDU/CSU–SPD
Government after election
First Brandt cabinet
SPD–FDP

A federal election was held in West Germany on 28 September 1969 to elect the members of the 6th Bundestag. The CDU/CSU remained the largest faction and the Social Democratic Party (SPD) remained the largest single party in the Bundestag, winning 237 of the 518 seats. After the election, the SPD formed a coalition with the Free Democratic Party (FDP) and the former's leader Willy Brandt became the first Social Democratic Chancellor in West Germany's history, bringing an end to 20 years of CDU/CSU rule.

== Campaign ==
After the resignation of Chancellor Ludwig Erhard on 1 December 1966, a grand coalition of Christian Democrats and Social Democrats had governed West Germany under Chancellor Kurt Georg Kiesinger (CDU), with SPD chairman Willy Brandt as vice-chancellor and foreign minister.

Minister of Economic Affairs Karl Schiller (SPD) had proposed revaluing (increasing the external value of) the Deutsche Mark, West Germany's currency, to reduce the country's inflation rate and the rate of growth of the country's businesses' income. He also sought to reduce West Germany's economic dependence on the exports. However, Finance Minister Franz-Josef Strauss (CSU) rejected the Deutsche Mark's revaluation because Bavarian farmers, an important part of his constituency, opposed it. The European Economic Community's food commodity prices were paid in U.S. dollars, and the Deutsche Mark's revaluation would have made West German exports less competitive (i.e. more expensive for other Western Europeans to buy).

The coalition had already effectively ended before the election because of the revaluation dispute. In addition, enough West German voters were willing to give the Social Democratic leader, Foreign Minister Willy Brandt, a chance to govern West Germany. Brandt, who ran for the third time after 1961 and 1965, had shown sympathy towards groups, including left-wing intellectuals and activists of the German student movement, who had felt ignored by the Christian Democrat-led coalition governments. In addition, his intellect, self-control and reputation for honesty appealed to ordinary West Germans.

== Results ==
Party	Party-list			Constituency			Seats			
Party	Votes	%	Seats	Votes	%	Seats	Elected	West Berlin	Total	+/–
Social Democratic Party	14,065,716	42.67	97	14,402,374	44.03	127	224	13	237	+20
Christian Democratic Union	12,079,535	36.64	106	12,137,148	37.10	87	193	8	201	–1
Christian Social Union	3,115,652	9.45	15	3,094,176	9.46	34	49	0	49	0
Free Democratic Party	1,903,422	5.77	30	1,554,651	4.75	0	30	1	31	–19
National Democratic Party	1,422,010	4.31	0	1,189,375	3.64	0	0	0	0	0
Campaign for Democratic Progress	197,331	0.60	0	209,180	0.64	0	0	0	0	New
Bavaria Party	49,694	0.15	0	54,940	0.17	0	0	0	0	New
European Federalist Party	49,650	0.15	0	20,927	0.06	0	0	0	0	0
All-German Party	45,401	0.14	0				0	0	0	New
Free Social Union	16,371	0.05	0	10,192	0.03	0	0	0	0	0
Centre Party	15,933	0.05	0				0	0	0	New
Independent Workers' Party	5,309	0.02	0	1,531	0.00	0	0	0	0	0
German People's Party				461	0.00	0	0	0	0	New
Independents and voter groups				38,561	0.12	0	0	0	0	0
Total	32,966,024	100.00	248	32,713,516	100.00	248	496	22	518	0
Valid votes	32,966,024	98.34		32,713,516	97.59					
Invalid/blank votes	557,040	1.66		809,548	2.41					
Total votes	33,523,064	100.00		33,523,064	100.00					
Registered voters/turnout	38,677,235	86.67		38,677,235	86.67					
Source: Bundeswahlleiter

=== Results by state ===
==== Constituency seats ====
State	Total seats	Seats won		
State	Total seats	SPD	CDU	CSU
Baden-Württemberg	36	9	27	
Bavaria	44	10		34
Bremen	3	3		
Hamburg	8	8		
Hesse	22	20	2	
Lower Saxony	30	18	12	
North Rhine-Westphalia	73	47	26	
Rhineland-Palatinate	16	6	10	
Saarland	5	2	3	
Schleswig-Holstein	11	4	7	
Total	248	127	87	34

==== List seats ====
State	Total seats	Seats won			
State	Total seats	CDU	SPD	FDP	CSU
Baden-Württemberg	34	10	18	6	
Bavaria	40		21	4	15
Bremen	2	2			
Hamburg	9	6	2	1	
Hesse	24	17	4	3	
Lower Saxony	33	18	11	4	
North Rhine-Westphalia	78	43	26	9	
Rhineland-Palatinate	15	6	7	2	
Saarland	3	1	2		
Schleswig-Holstein	10	3	6	1	
Total	248	106	97	30	15

== Aftermath ==
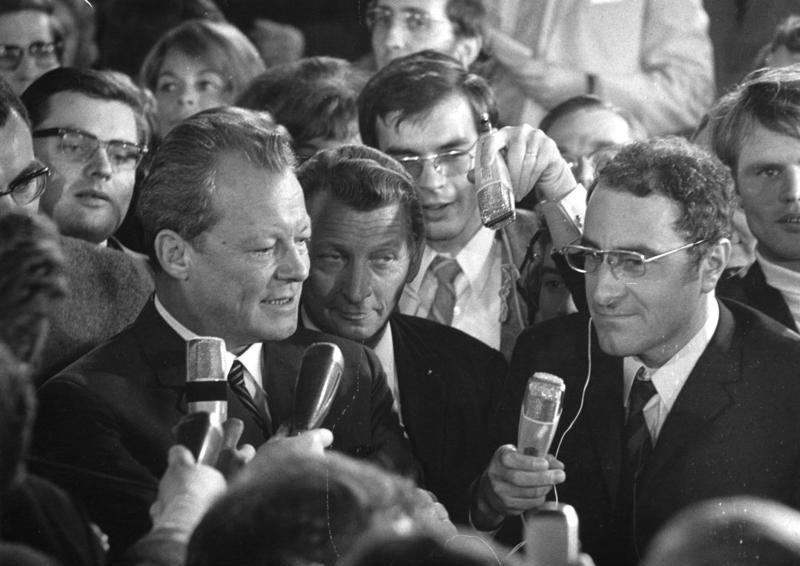
Brandt speaks to the press on election night, 28 September

Willy Brandt, against the will of several party fellows like Herbert Wehner or Helmut Schmidt, chose to leave the grand coalition with the CDU/CSU, forming a social-liberal coalition with the Free Democratic Party (FDP) instead. On 21 October 1969 he was elected Chancellor of Germany, the first SPD chancellor in the postwar period, after the last Social Democrat holding this position had been Hermann Müller from 1928 to 1930. FDP chairman Walter Scheel succeeded Brandt as vice-chancellor and foreign minister. Brandt's government proceeded with the revaluation Schiller had proposed, raising the value of the mark by 9.3% in late October.

Disappointed Kiesinger bitterly complained about the faithless liberals. Though he had again achieved the plurality of votes for the CDU, he had to lead his party into opposition. He was succeeded as chairman by Rainer Barzel in 1971.

However the Cabinet Brandt I could only rely on an absolute majority (Kanzlermehrheit) of twelve votes in the Bundestag. Several party switches in protest against Brandt's Ostpolitik of FDP and SPD members resulted in the snap election of 1972.
