= Social–liberal coalition =

Governmental coalition in German politics

Social–liberal coalition (German: Sozialliberale Koalition) in the politics of Germany refers to a governmental coalition formed by the Social Democratic Party of Germany (SPD) and the Free Democratic Party (FDP). From 1969 to 1982, social–liberal coalitions led by Federal Chancellors Willy Brandt and Helmut Schmidt governed the Federal Republic of Germany: First and second Brandt cabinet, first and second Schmidt cabinet.

The term stems from social democracy of the SPD and the liberalism of the FDP. Because of the colours traditionally used to symbolise the two parties (red for SPD and yellow for FDP), such a coalition is also referred to as a "red–yellow" coalition (rot–gelbe Koalition). The FDP is basically an economic/classical liberal party, but under the coalition, the FDP and the SPD are close to left-liberalism (Linksliberalismus).

In the past, the SPD usually governs with the Alliance '90/The Greens and the FDP orients itself towards long-term co-operation with the Christian Democratic Union and Bavarian Christian Social Union. However, a social–liberal coalition ruled from 1991 to 2006 in the German State of Rhineland-Palatinate and would have continued to do so, had the SPD not won an absolute majority. Social–liberal coalitions have previously been in power in many other federal states of Germany as well.

As of 2025, social–liberal coalitions have become rare, as the FDP missed the Five percent hurdle in many elections, i.e.

- 2013 and 2025 German federal election
- Saxony: In the September 2024 election, the FDP received only 0.9% of the vote.
- Thuringia: In September 2024, FDP the received only 1.1%
- Brandenburg: In the 2024 election, the FDP received 0.8% of the vote
- Bavaria: 3.0 % in the 2023 state election
- Lower Saxony: 4.7 % in the 2022 state election
- Saarland: 4.8 % in the 2022 state election
- Berlin: 2.3 % in the 2026 state election
- Hamburg: 2.3% in the 2025 state election

The traffic light coalition (Scholz cabinet (December 2021-May 2025) was a combination of the social–liberal coalition and the red–green coalition insofar as it included SPD, FDP and the greens, which are the constituent elements of the other two coalitions. The Weimar Coalition was a similar constellation of parties as it included the Social Democratic Party as well as a left-liberal party (the then German Democratic Party one of the predecessors of the FDP) and the liberal-conservative/conservative-liberal element also present in the FDP with the Zentrumspartei. However, the political Catholicism espoused by the Zentrum is absent in the postwar social–liberal coalition.

== Social–liberal coalitions at the federal state level ==
After the term, the leader of the government is given.

=== Berlin ===
- 1963–66 Willy Brandt (despite having an absolute majority)
- 1966–67 Heinrich Albertz (despite having an absolute majority: de:Senat Albertz I – de:Senat Albertz II)
- 1967–71 Klaus Schütz (despite having an absolute majority)
- 1975–77 Klaus Schütz
- 1977–81 Dietrich Stobbe
- 1981 Hans-Jochen Vogel

=== Bremen ===
- 1959–65 Wilhelm Kaisen
- 1967–71 Hans Koschnick

=== Hamburg ===
- 1957–61 Max Brauer
- 1961–65 Paul Nevermann
- 1965–66 Herbert Weichmann (de)
- 1970–71 Herbert Weichmann (de)
- 1971–74 Peter Schulz (de)
- 1974–78 Hans-Ulrich Klose (de)
- 1987–88 Klaus von Dohnanyi (de)
- 1988–91 Henning Voscherau (de)

=== Hesse ===
- 1970–76 Albert Osswald (de)
- 1976–82 Holger Börner (Cabinets I, II, III)

=== Lower Saxony ===
- 1963–65 Georg Diederichs
- 1974–76 Alfred Kubel (de)

=== North Rhine-Westphalia ===
- 1956–58 Fritz Steinhoff (de)
- 1966–78 Heinz Kühn
- 1978–80 Johannes Rau (de:Kabinett Rau I)

=== Rhineland-Palatinate ===
- 1991–94 Rudolf Scharping
- 1994–2006 Kurt Beck (I, II, III, IV)

== See also ==
- German governing coalition
- Grand coalition (Germany)
- Traffic light coalition
- Jamaica coalition
- Red–green alliance
- Lib–Lab pact, the equivalent in British politics
- Social Liberal Union and National Coalition for Romania, the equivalents in Romanian politics
- Purple coalition, the equivalent in the Benelux
