= 1980 West German federal election =

← 1976	5 October 1980	1983 →

All 497 seats in the Bundestag (Note: As well as the 22 non-voting delegates for West Berlin, elected by the West Berlin Legislature.) 249 seats needed for a majority
- Registered: 43,231,741 ▲2.8%
- Turnout: 38,292,176 (88.6%) ▼2.1 pp
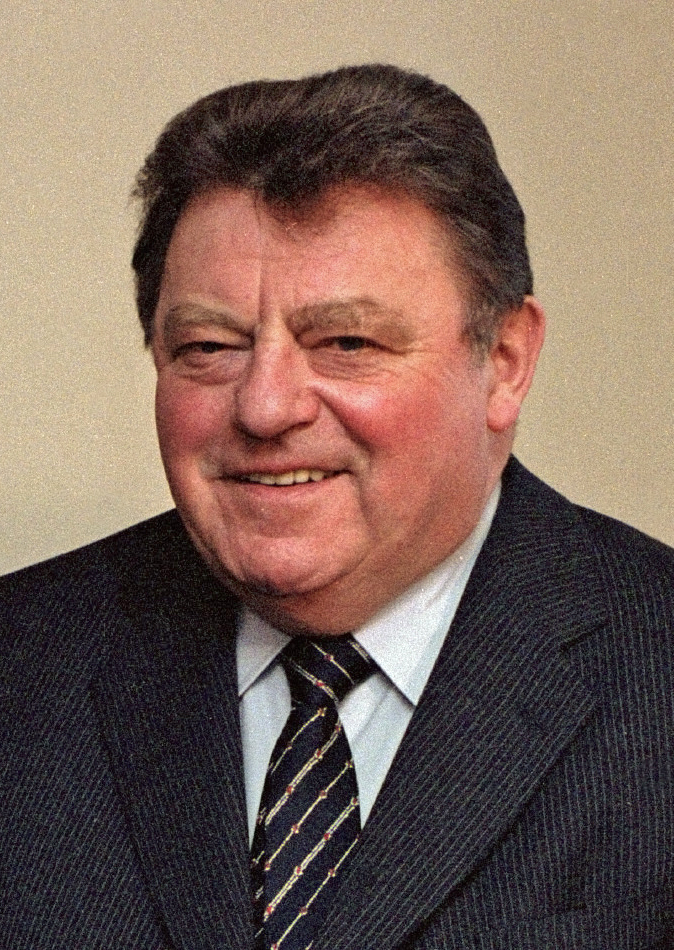

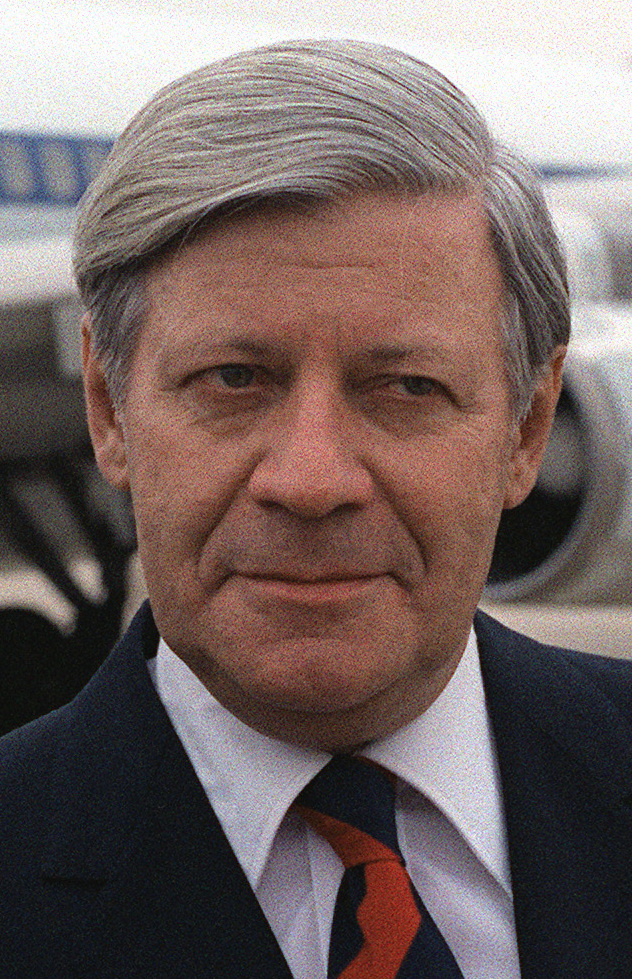

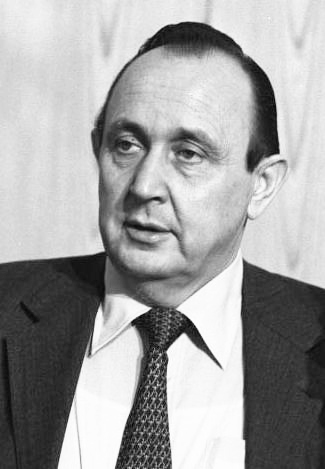
	First party	Second party	Third party
Candidate	Franz-Josef Strauss	Helmut Schmidt	Hans-Dietrich Genscher
Party	CDU/CSU	SPD	FDP
Last election	48.6%, 243 seats	42.6%, 214 seats	7.9%, 39 seats
Seats won	226 (Note: As well as 11 non-voting delegates for West Berlin.)	218 (Note: As well as 10 non-voting delegates for West Berlin.)	53 (Note: As well as 1 non-voting delegate for West Berlin.)
Seat change	▼17	▲4	▲14
Popular vote	16,897,659	16,260,677	4,030,999
Percentage	44.5%	42.9%	10.6%
Swing	▼4.1 pp	▲0.3 pp	▲2.7 pp
- The left side shows constituency winners of the election by their party colours. The right side shows party list winners of the election for the additional members by their party colours.
Government before election
Second Schmidt cabinet
SPD–FDP
Government after election
Third Schmidt cabinet
SPD–FDP

A federal election was held in West Germany on 5 October 1980 to elect the members of the 9th Bundestag. Although the CDU/CSU remained the largest faction in parliament, Helmut Schmidt of the Social Democratic Party remained Chancellor.

== Issues and campaign ==
Chancellor Helmut Schmidt of the SPD-FDP coalition wanted to be re-elected. The CDU/CSU candidate for Chancellor was CSU leader Franz Josef Strauß. It was the first time that their candidate was from the CSU. Strauß, immensely popular in Bavaria, found it difficult to appeal to people in other parts of Germany. One important reason for Strauss's unpopularity compared to Federal Chancellor Helmut Schmidt, was his tendency to talk sharply and militantly about his political opponents. Schmidt, by contrast, was still seen by many West German voters as a moderate and practical manager and doer, who focused on getting concrete political and economic results more than on political rhetoric.

== Results ==
Party	Party-list			Constituency			Seats			
Party	Votes	%	Seats	Votes	%	Seats	Elected	West Berlin	Total	+/–
Social Democratic Party	16,260,677	42.86	91	16,808,861	44.46	127	218	10	228	+4
Christian Democratic Union	12,989,200	34.24	93	13,467,207	35.62	81	174	11	185	–16
Free Democratic Party	4,030,999	10.62	53	2,720,480	7.20	0	53	1	54	+14
Christian Social Union	3,908,459	10.30	12	3,941,365	10.43	40	52	0	52	–1
The Greens	569,589	1.50	0	732,619	1.94	0	0	0	0	New
German Communist Party	71,600	0.19	0	107,158	0.28	0	0	0	0	0
National Democratic Party	68,096	0.18	0				0	0	0	0
Citizens' Party	11,256	0.03	0	507	0.00	0	0	0	0	New
People's Front Against Reaction, Fascism and War	9,319	0.02	0	7,160	0.02	0	0	0	0	New
Communist League of West Germany	8,174	0.02	0	12,008	0.03	0	0	0	0	0
European Workers' Party	7,666	0.02	0	4,992	0.01	0	0	0	0	0
Christian Bavarian People's Party	3,946	0.01	0				0	0	0	0
German Union				421	0.00	0	0	0	0	New
Independent Workers' Party				159	0.00	0	0	0	0	0
German Freedom Party				96	0.00	0	0	0	0	New
Independents and voter groups				3,498	0.01	0	0	0	0	0
Total	37,938,981	100.00	249	37,806,531	100.00	248	497	22	519	+1
Valid votes	37,938,981	99.08		37,806,531	98.73					
Invalid/blank votes	353,115	0.92		485,645	1.27					
Total votes	38,292,096	100.00		38,292,176	100.00					
Registered voters/turnout	43,231,741	88.57		43,231,741	88.57					
Source: Bundeswahlleiter

Seat results – SPD in red, FDP in yellow, CDU/CSU in black

=== Results by state ===
==== Constituency seats ====
State	Total seats	Seats won		
State	Total seats	SPD	CDU	CSU
Baden-Württemberg	37	6	31	
Bavaria	45	5		40
Bremen	3	3		
Hamburg	7	7		
Hesse	22	19	3	
Lower Saxony	31	23	8	
North Rhine-Westphalia	71	44	27	
Rhineland-Palatinate	16	6	10	
Saarland	5	3	2	
Schleswig-Holstein	11	11		
Total	248	127	81	40

==== List seats ====
State	Total seats	Seats won			
State	Total seats	CDU	SPD	FDP	CSU
Baden-Württemberg	35	5	21	9	
Bavaria	44		25	7	12
Bremen	1	1			
Hamburg	6	4		2	
Hesse	24	16	3	5	
Lower Saxony	32	18	7	7	
North Rhine-Westphalia	76	33	26	17	
Rhineland-Palatinate	16	5	8	3	
Saarland	3	2	1		
Schleswig-Holstein	12	9		3	
Total	249	93	91	53	12

== Post-election ==
The coalition between the SPD and the FDP returned to government, with Helmut Schmidt as Chancellor. In 1982, the FDP quit the government, which led to the government's collapse and replacement with a new CDU/CSU – FDP coalition under Helmut Kohl.

== Sources ==
- The Federal Returning Officer
- Psephos
