= 1972 West German federal election =

- 19 November 1972

All 496 seats in the Bundestag (Note: As well as the 22 non-voting delegates for West Berlin, elected by the West Berlin Legislature.) 249 seats needed for a majority
- Registered: 41,446,302 (▲7.2%)
- Turnout: 91.1% (▲4.4 pp)
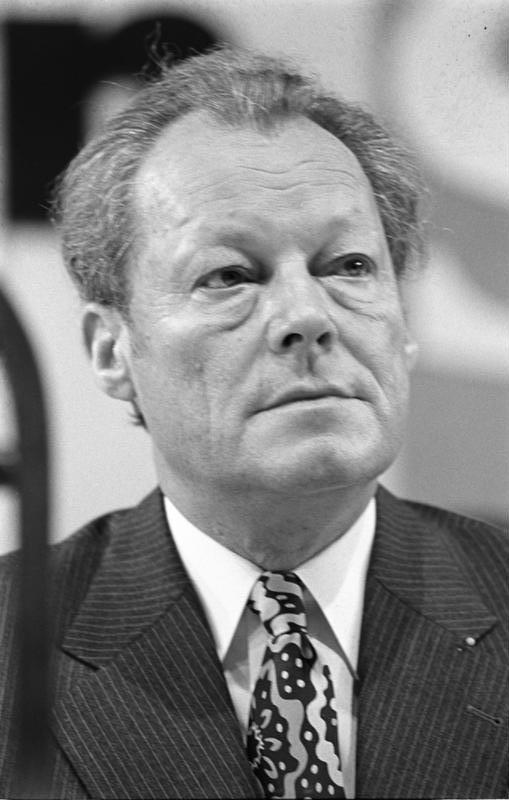

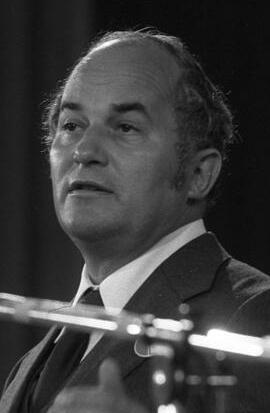

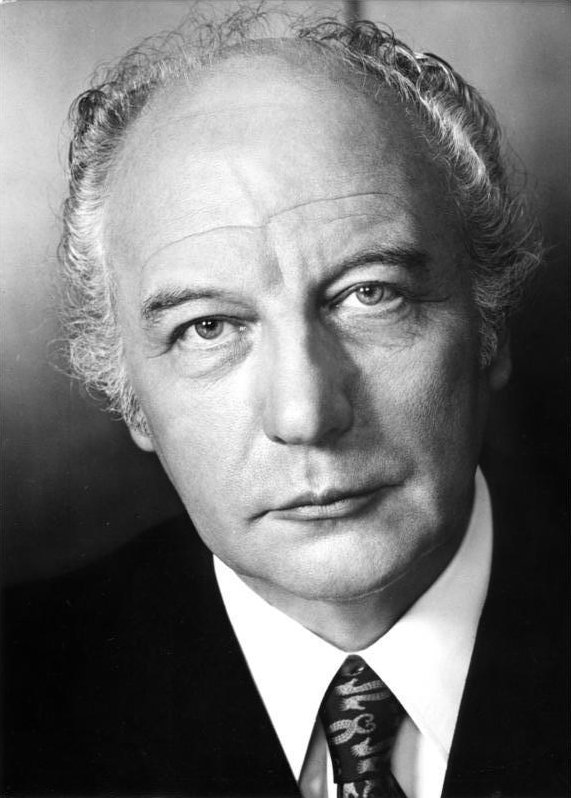
	First party	Second party	Third party
Leader	Willy Brandt	Rainer Barzel	Walter Scheel
Party	SPD	CDU/CSU	FDP
Last election	42.7%, 224 seats	46.1%, 242 seats	5.8%, 30 seats
Seats won	230 (Note: As well as 12 non-voting delegates for West Berlin.)	225 (Note: As well as 9 non-voting delegates for West Berlin.)	41 (Note: As well as 1 non-voting delegate for West Berlin.)
Seat change	▲6	▼17	▲11
Popular vote	17,175,169	16,806,020	3,129,982
Percentage	45.8%	44.9%	8.4%
Swing	▲3.1 pp	▼1.2 pp	▲2.6 pp
- The left side shows constituency winners of the election by their party colours. The right side shows party list winners of the election for the additional members by their party colours.
Government before election
First Brandt cabinet
SPD–FDP
Government after election
Second Brandt cabinet
SPD–FDP

A federal election was held in West Germany on 19 November 1972 to elect the members of the seventh Bundestag. In the first snap elections since the resumption of democratic elections in 1949, the Social Democratic Party (SPD) emerged as the largest party in parliament, winning 230 of the 496 seats. The SPD's Willy Brandt remained chancellor after resuming his coalition government with the Free Democratic Party.

The SPD's vote share of 45.8% represents its best ever election result in the history of German elections and has not been achieved since.

== Campaign ==
The Social-liberal coalition of SPD and FDP had lost its majority after several Bundestag MPs (like former FDP ministers Erich Mende and Heinz Starke or SPD partisan Herbert Hupka) had left their party and become members of the CDU/CSU opposition to protest against Chancellor Willy Brandt's Neue Ostpolitik, especially against the de facto recognition of the Oder-Neisse line by the 1970 Treaty of Warsaw.

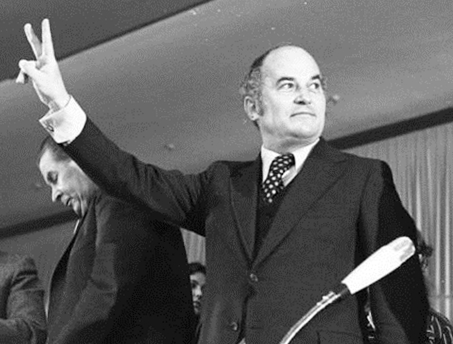
Barzel in victory pose at a CDU election rally in Cologne

On 27 April 1972 the opposition had tried to have CDU leader Rainer Barzel elected new chancellor in a constructive vote of no confidence, but Barzel surprisingly missed the majority of 249 by two votes. Rumours that at least one member of the CDU/CSU faction had been paid by the East German Stasi to abstain (in effect, voting against Barzel) were confirmed by Markus Wolf, former head of the Hauptverwaltung Aufklärung, in 1997. Nevertheless, the following budget debates revealed that the government's majority was lost and only the upcoming organisation of the 1972 Summer Olympics in Munich delayed the arrangement of new elections. On 22 September 1972 Chancellor Brandt asked for a vote of confidence, which required the same majority of 249 "yes" votes: it failed with 233 "yes" votes to 246 "no" votes. The members of the government did not participate (in effect, voting no) to ensure the vote would fail, however it would have regardless. This allowed Brandt to advise President Gustav Heinemann to dissolve the Bundestag and call new elections the same day.

In the tense campaign, the CDU/CSU attacked Brandt as being too lenient towards Eastern Europe and having the wrong ideas on the economy. SPD and FDP benefited from the enormous personal popularity of the chancellor, laureate of the 1971 Nobel Peace Prize. He gained the support by numerous celebrities of the West German culture and media scene (e.g. Günter Grass), expressed by the slogan Willy wählen! ("Vote for Willy!").

== Opinion polls ==
Polling firm	Fieldwork date	Sample size	Union	SPD	FDP	NPD	Others	Abstention	Lead
1972 federal election	19 Nov 1972	–	44.86	45.85	8.4	0.6	0.4	8.9	0.99
Allensbach	1–7 Nov 1972	?	46.5	45.7	6.1	—	1.7	—	0.8
Allensbach	1–7 Oct 1972	?	45.0	46.0	6.0	—	3.0	—	1
Emnid for SPIEGEL	Feb 1971	N/A	39	33	5	—	23		6
1969 federal election	19 Nov 1972	–	46.1	42.7	5.8	4.3	1.2	13.3	3.4

== Results ==
Voter turnout was 91.1%, the highest ever since 1949. In 1970 the voting age had been lowered from 21 to 18.

Party	Party-list			Constituency			Seats			
Party	Votes	%	Seats	Votes	%	Seats	Elected	West Berlin	Total	+/–
Social Democratic Party	17,175,169	45.85	78	18,228,239	48.86	152	230	12	242	+5
Christian Democratic Union	13,190,837	35.21	112	13,304,813	35.67	65	177	9	186	–15
Christian Social Union	3,615,183	9.65	17	3,620,625	9.71	31	48	0	48	–1
Free Democratic Party	3,129,982	8.36	41	1,790,513	4.80	0	41	1	42	+11
National Democratic Party	207,465	0.55	0	194,389	0.52	0	0	0	0	0
German Communist Party	113,891	0.30	0	146,258	0.39	0	0	0	0	New
European Federalist Party	24,057	0.06	0	7,581	0.02	0	0	0	0	0
Free Social Union	3,166	0.01	0	1,864	0.00	0	0	0	0	0
Independents and voter groups				9,497	0.03	0	0	0	0	0
Total	37,459,750	100.00	248	37,303,779	100.00	248	496	22	518	0
Valid votes	37,459,750	99.20		37,303,779	98.79					
Invalid/blank votes	301,839	0.80		457,810	1.21					
Total votes	37,761,589	100.00		37,761,589	100.00					
Registered voters/turnout	41,446,302	91.11		41,446,302	91.11					
Source: Bundeswahlleiter

The SPD celebrated their best result ever, representing the largest faction in the German parliament for the first time since the 1930 Reichstag elections. It enabled the party to nominate Annemarie Renger for President of the Bundestag; she was the first Social Democrat and also the first woman to hold this office.

=== Results by state ===
==== Constituency seats ====
State	Total seats	Seats won		
State	Total seats	SPD	CDU	CSU
Baden-Württemberg	36	12	24	
Bavaria	44	13		31
Bremen	3	3		
Hamburg	8	8		
Hesse	22	20	2	
Lower Saxony	30	23	7	
North Rhine-Westphalia	73	52	21	
Rhineland-Palatinate	16	9	7	
Saarland	5	3	2	
Schleswig-Holstein	11	9	2	
Total	248	152	65	31

==== List seats ====
State	Total seats	Seats won			
State	Total seats	CDU	SPD	FDP	CSU
Baden-Württemberg	36	12	16	8	
Bavaria	42		20	5	17
Bremen	1	1			
Hamburg	8	5	1	2	
Hesse	25	17	3	5	
Lower Saxony	32	20	7	5	
North Rhine-Westphalia	75	40	23	12	
Rhineland-Palatinate	15	8	5	2	
Saarland	3	2	1		
Schleswig-Holstein	11	7	2	2	
Total	248	112	78	41	17

== Post-election ==
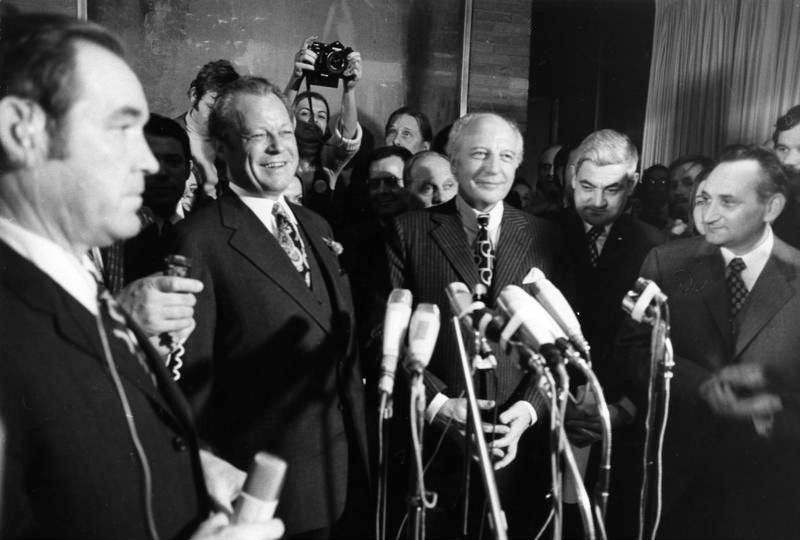
Election night: Brandt and Scheel declare victory at 10:20pm

On 14 December 1972 the Bundestag MPs of the social-liberal coalition re-elected Willy Brandt chancellor. His Cabinet Brandt II returned to government the next day, again with FDP chairman Walter Scheel as vice-chancellor and foreign minister. Defeated Rainer Barzel resigned as CDU chairman on 9 May 1973; he was succeeded by Helmut Kohl.

On 7 May 1974, Brandt would resign in the course of the Guillaume Affair, after one of his personal aides had been unmasked as a Stasi agent. The coalition continued under his party fellow Helmut Schmidt, while Brandt remained SPD chairman until 1987.
