= Gerhard Danelius =

German politician (1913–1978)

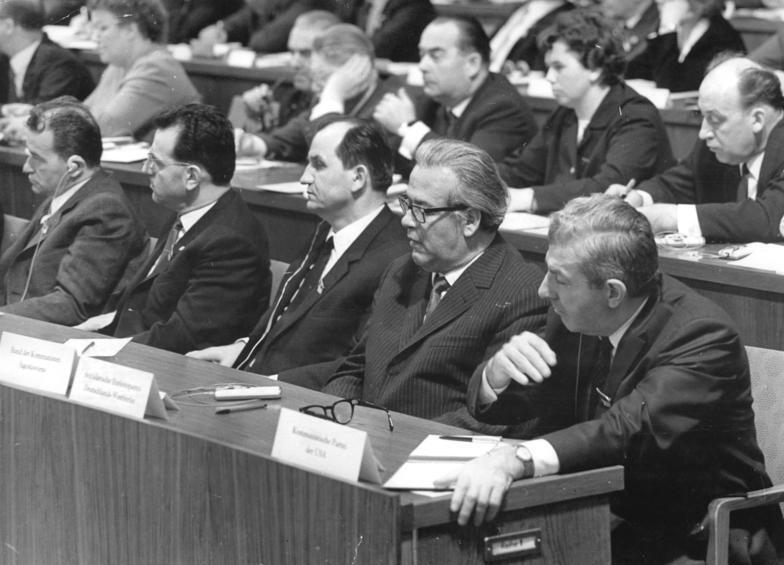
Gerhard Danelius (second from right).

Gerhard Danelius (April 2, 1913 Berlin-Wilmersdorf – May 18, 1978 Berlin-Buch) was a German communist politician. During the Second World War, he was active in antifascist struggles.

He was the chairman of the Socialist Unity Party of West Berlin, from the first congress of the party in 1966 to his death in 1978.
