= Socialist Youth League Karl Liebknecht =

Left-wing youth organization in West Berlin

Socialist Youth League Karl Liebknecht Sozialistischer Jugendverband Karl Liebknecht

- Founded: 1947
- Headquarters: Allerstrasse 35, West Berlin
- Mother party: Socialist Unity Party of West Berlin
- International affiliation: WFDY

Socialist Youth League Karl Liebknecht, (German: Sozialistischer Jugendverband Karl Liebknecht, abbreviated SJV-KL), initially known as the Free German Youth of West Berlin (German: Freie Deutsche Jugend Westberlins, abbreviated FDJW), was a youth organization in West Berlin during the Cold War. It was the youth organization of Socialist Unity Party of West Berlin (SEW). It was named after the revolutionary leader Karl Liebknecht.

== Free German Youth of West Berlin ==
The Free German Youth (FDJ) organization in Berlin was legalized by the Allied occupation authorities in October 1947, along with three other youth organizations. Until 1961 FDJ branches in West Berlin were part of the all-Berlin organization of FDJ. By 1948 FDJ had 657 members in West Berlin, but by 1954 the membership numbers had been halved. The June 1951 prohibition of the FDJ movement in West Germany did not affect the FDJ in West Berlin, due to the special status of the city. On August 21, 1961 a West Berlin unit of FDJ, Free German Youth of West Berlin (FDJW), was constituted. At a FDJW City Delegate Conference June 7–8, 1969 new statutes of FDJW were adopted, to legitimize the work of the organization on the basis of the September 1, 1950 West Berlin constitution. Thus FDJW was organizationally separated from the East German FDJ central organization.

During the latter half of the 1970s FDJW ran a campaign against youth unemployment and against lack of vocational training opportunities. The FDJW chairman at the time was Peter Klaar. The peak of the campaign was the holding of a musical festival ('Atze-Fest '76') at Lützowplatz June 12–13, 1976, with performances from Puhdys, Dean Reed, Perry Friedman and others. The Atze-Fest '76 was attended by some 10,000 people. FDJW membership peaked in 1979–1980 at around 1,000 members.

== SJV Karl Liebknecht ==
At its 8th congress, held in May 1980, FDJW took the name SJV-KL. SJV-KL was a democratic mass organization, organizing cultural and sporting activities. The organization was active in the peace movement, mobilized anti-fascist campaigns and campaigned against unemployment and rent hikes. The organization played a leading role in the 'Youth Initiative against Rearmament' (IJGA), which was a prominent force in the West Berlin peace movement. SJV-KL maintained close contacts with other youth organizations in West Berlin, such as Socialist Youth of Germany – The Falcons, Jusos, Young European Federalists, Naturfreundejugend, Bund der Deutschen Katholischen Jugend, Evangelische Jugend, the squatters' movements, etc.

It had its offices on Allerstrasse 35. Volker Junge, who was also a SEW politburo member, was the chairman of SJV-KL. The organization published the monthly magazine Signal. There was also a pioneer movement under SJV-KL, the Karl Liebknecht Pioneer Organization (German: Pionierorganisation Karl Liebknecht, abbreviated 'POKL'), with some 250–300 members.

SJV-KL and the Aktionsgemeinschaft von Demokraten und Sozialisten (ADS, the SEW-aligned students movement) organized the Youth Day festival with an anti-NATO theme September 25–26, 1982, which was attended by some 20,000 people. A second Youth Day event was held October 27, 1984 under the slogan 'Peace, Work, Education and Anti-Imperialist Solidarity', attended by some 10,000 people. A third Youth Day was organized on May 31, 1986, which attendance numbers estimated at between 6,000–15,000 people.

SJV-KL was a member of World Federation of Democratic Youth, and conducted international youth exchange activities. By 1989 SJV-KL had some 200 members.
