= 1979 West Berlin state election =

State election in West Germany

On March 18, 1979, elections were held to elect the members of the (West) Berlin House of Representatives.

== Results ==
Summary of the results of the 18 March 1979 election to Berlin's Abgeordnetenhaus
Parties	Votes	%	+/-	Seats	+/-
Christian Democratic Union	570,174	44.4%	+0.5%	63	-6
Social Democratic Party of Germany	548,060	42.7%	+0.1%	61	-6
Free Democratic Party	103,609	8.1%	+1.0%	11	-
Alternative List	47,642	3.7%	+3.7%	0	
Socialist Unity Party of West Berlin	13,744	1.1%	-0.7%	0	
Communist League of West Germany	1,367	0.1%	±0.0%	0	
Total	1,310,553	100%		135	-12
