= 1985 West Berlin state election =

State election in West Germany

- 10 March 1985

All 144 seats of the Abgeordnetenhaus of Berlin 73 seats needed for a majority
- Turnout: 1,259,818 (83.6%)
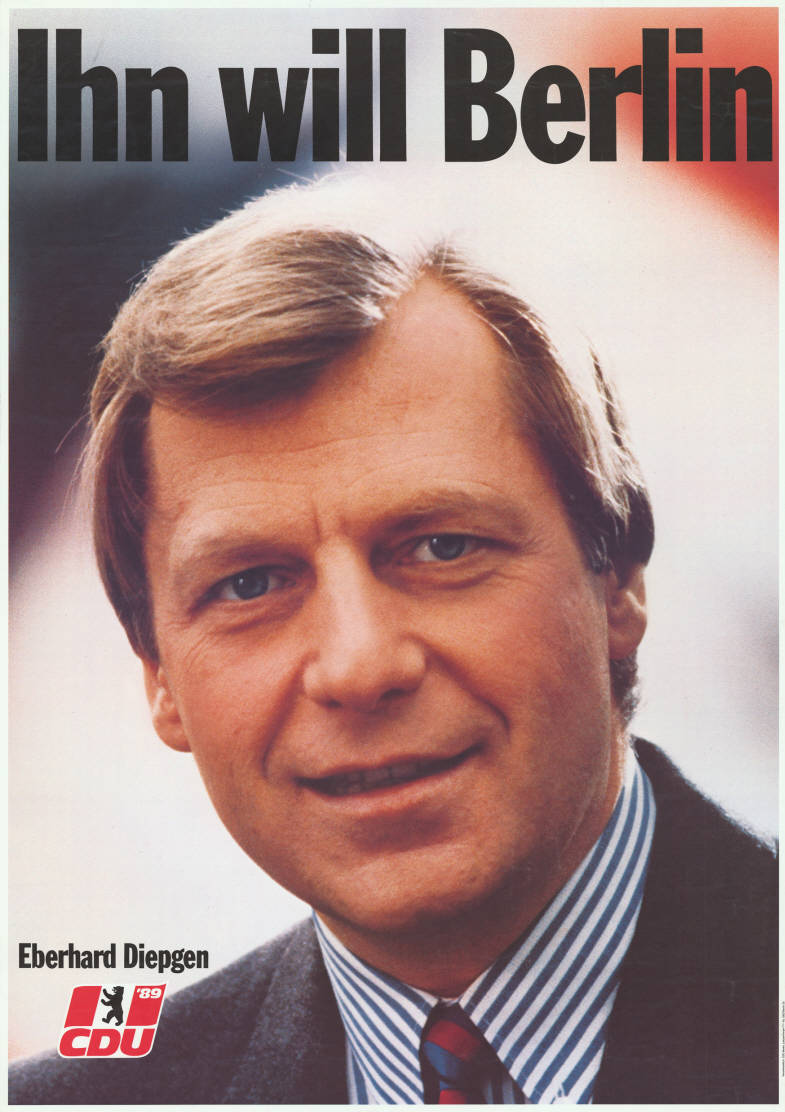

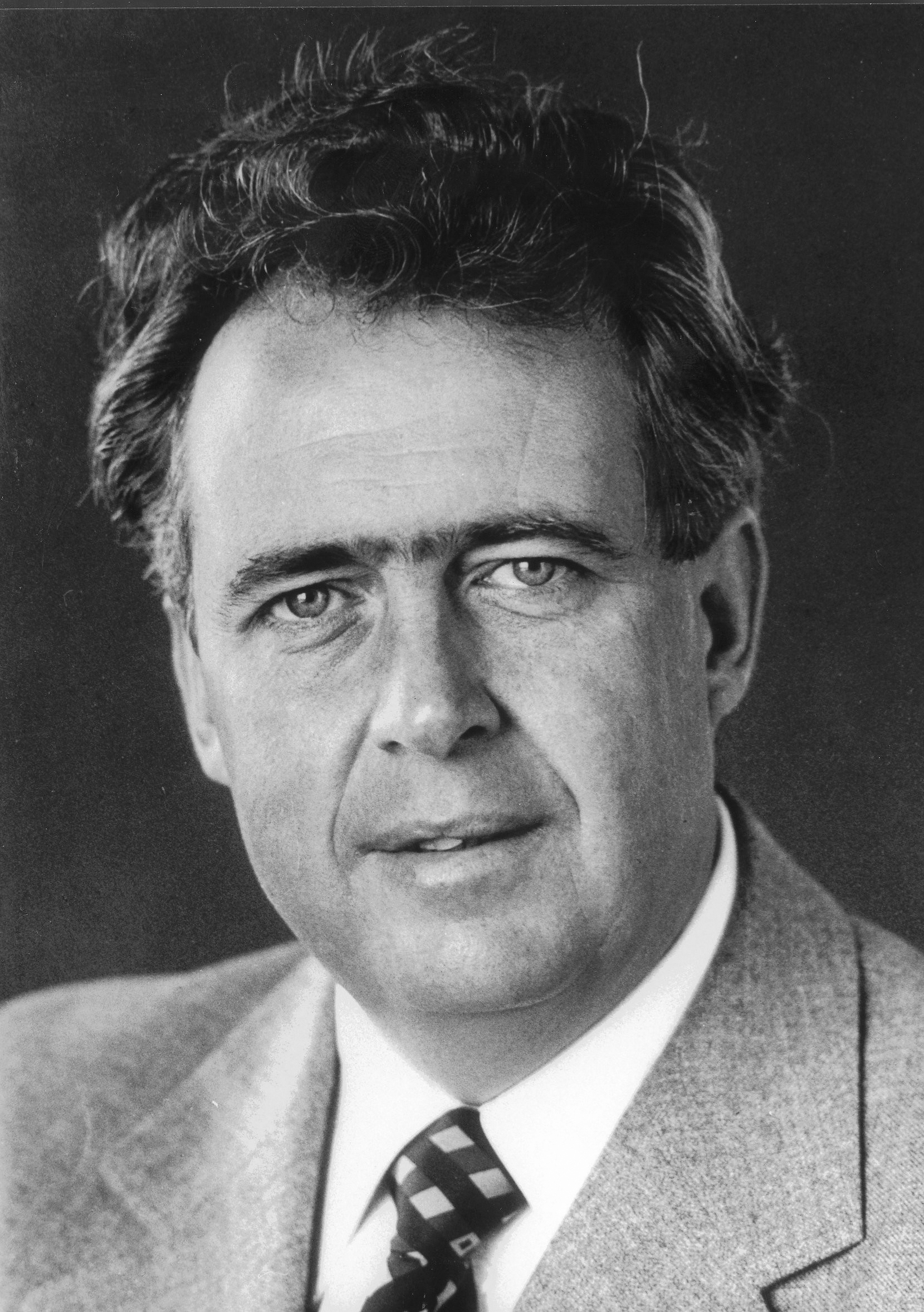
	First party	Second party
Leader	Eberhard Diepgen	Hans Apel
Party	CDU	SPD
Last election	65 seats, 48.0%	51 seats, 38.3%
Seats won	69	48
Seat change	▲4	▼3
Popular vote	577,867	402,875
Percentage	46.4%	32.4%
Swing	▼1.6%	▼5.9%
	Third party	Fourth party
Party	Greens	FDP
Last election	9 seats, 7.2%	7 seats, 5.6%
Seats won	15	12
Seat change	▲6	▲5
Popular vote	132,484	105,209
Percentage	10.6%	8.5%
Swing	▲3.4%	▲2.9%
- Results for single-member constituencies.
Governing Mayor before election
Eberhard Diepgen
CDU
Elected Governing Mayor
Eberhard Diepgen
CDU

The 1985 West Berlin state election was held on 10 March 1985. Eberhard Diepgen was the CDU's lead candidate and would later be unanimously elected as the mayor of West Berlin.

Summary of the results of the 10 March 1985 election to Berlin's Abgeordnetenhaus
Parties	Votes	%	+/-	Seats	+/-
Christian Democratic Union	577,867	46.4%	-1.6%	69	+4
Social Democratic Party of Germany	402,875	32.4%	-5.9%	48	-3
Alternative List	132,484	10.6%	+3.4%	15	+6
Free Democratic Party	105,209	8.5%	+2.9%	12	+5
Democratic Alternative	15,857	1.3%	+1.3%	0	
Socialist Unity Party of West Berlin	7,731	0.6%	±0.0%	0	
Liberal Democrats	1,416	0.1%	+0.1%	0	
Social People's Party of Germany	1,406	0.1%	+0.1%	0	
Ecological Democratic Party	163	0.0%	+0.0%	0	
Total	1,259,818	100%		144	+12
Primary Source & Secondary Source
