= 1954 West Berlin state election =

The election to the Berlin House of Representatives occurred on December 5, 1954, alongside elections to the twelve borough assemblies of Berlin. The Social Democratic Party of Germany (SPD) nominated Otto Suhr as their leading candidate. The Christian Democratic Union (CDU) nominated the incumbent mayor since October 1953, Walther Schreiber.

Although the opposition SPD lost 0.1 percentage points, it narrowly increased its presence in parliament and obtained a majority of deputies. The CDU also increased its share of the vote by 5.7 percentage points, increasing their number of deputies by 10. These gains by the CDU were offset by a collapse in support for the Free Democratic Party (FDP), which lost 10.2 percentage points and 13 deputies. The German Party narrowly failed to cross the 5% electoral threshold, winning 4.9% of the vote, around 2,500 votes shy of making it into the parliament. For the first time since the splitting of the city administration into east and west the Socialist Unity Party (SED) competed in West Berlin; the party was unable to make any electoral impact, however, winning just 2.7% of the vote.

While the SPD did win an outright majority, they agreed to enter into a coalition with the CDU because of the tense political situation in Berlin at the time. On January 11, 1955, Suhr was elected as West Berlin's new mayor.

Summary of the results of the 5 December 1954 election to Berlin's Abgeordnetenhaus
Parties	Votes	%	+/-	Seats	+/-
Social Democratic Party of Germany	684,906	44.6%	-0.1%	64	+3
Christian Democratic Union	467,117	30.4%	+5.7%	44	+10
Free Democratic Party	197,204	12.8%	-10.3%	19	-13
German Party	75,321	4.9%	+1.2%	0	
Socialist Unity Party	41,375	2.7%	+2.7%	0	
All German Bloc	39,236	2.5%	+0.3%	0	
Other Parties	30,734	2.1%	+0.3%	0	
Total	1,555,511	100%		127	-
