= 1950 West Berlin state election =

Democratic election in Berlin

Early elections to the Berlin House of Representatives were held on 3 December 1950. In October 1950 Germany's new constitution went into force in West Berlin which made the election required. This was the first election to the new Berlin House of Representatives as opposed to the City Council.

The top candidate of the SPD was not the popular mayor Ernst Reuter, but Franz Neumann; The CDU nominated Walther Schreiber. The SPD had considerable losses, dropping 19.8 percentage points in just two years, however they still received 44.7% of the vote and were by far the largest party. The main reason the SPD suffered said losses was because political tension had been falling since the end of the blockade and the SPD were viewed by many within the electorate as having significant internal disputes. The CDU gained 5.3 percentage points to win 24.7% of the vote. The FDP won a surprisingly high 23.0% of the vote.

After the inaugural session of the House of Representatives, Reuter and Schreiber both received 62 votes, Schreiber withdrew his candidacy in favour of incumbent mayor Reuters. This then led to the continuation of the SPD-CDU-FDP unity coalition with Reuters choosing Schreiber as his deputy.

Three years after these elections, the coalition collapsed after long-time mayor Ernst Reuter died on 29 September 1953. The CDU and FDP agreed to form a coalition government with the then deputy mayor Walther Schreiber becoming mayor. This pushed the SPD into opposition, and meant that for the first time since 1948 Berlin actually had a parliamentary opposition.

Summary of the results of the 3 December 1950 election to Berlin's Abgeordnetenhaus
Parties	Votes	%	+/-	Seats	+/-
Social Democratic Party of Germany	654,211	44.7%	-19.8%	61	-15
Christian Democratic Union	361,050	24.6%	+5.3%	34	+8
Free Democratic Party	337,589	23.0%	+7.0%	32	+15
German Party	53,810	3.7%	+3.7%	0	
All German Bloc	31,918	2.2%	+2.2%	0	
Other Parties	25,892	1.8%	+1.8%	0	
Total	1,464,470	100%		127	+8
