= 1971 West Berlin state election =

The election to the Berlin House of Representatives in 1971 took place on 14 March. The SPD experienced yet another change in leadership with the party choosing Governing Mayor Klaus Schütz as their lead candidate. The SPD in West Berlin had been led until 1966 by Willy Brandt before he had left to go to Bonn and enter politics on a national level. His successor was Heinrich Albertz, who resigned from his position amid considerable party squabbles relatively soon after taking it up. The opposition CDU meanwhile chose Peter Lorenz as there lead candidate. The SPD was able to win a fresh majority with 50.4% of votes of the vote. The CDU rose by 5.3 percentage points to 38.2% of the vote, which the FDP, former coalition partner of the SPD, increased by 1.3 percentage points to 8.4%. Klaus Schütz decided to form a majority SPD government, with the CDU and FDP going into opposition.

Summary of the results of the 14 March 1971 election to Berlin's Abgeordnetenhaus
Parties	Votes	%	+/-	Seats	+/-
Social Democratic Party of Germany	730,240	50.4%	-6.5%	73	-8
Christian Democratic Union	553,422	38.2%	+5.3%	54	+7
Free Democratic Party	122,310	8.4%	+1.3%	11	+2
Socialist Unity Party of West Berlin	33,845	2.3%	+0.3%	0	
Other Parties	9,136	0.6%	-0.5%	0	
Total	1,469,633	100%		138	+1
