= 1958 West Berlin state election =

The election to the Berlin House of Representatives in 1958 took place on December 7, 1958, and took place during an acute political crisis in Berlin. Khrushchev's ultimatum was made just ten days before the election date, and the threat from Soviet forces in the east was felt very strongly.

The top candidate of the SPD was the new mayor, Willy Brandt, the successor of the deceased former SPD mayor, Otto Suhr. Brandt himself had an immense personal popularity, which was primarily due to his resolute behaviour towards the Soviet occupying power.

The SPD recorded a vote increase of 8.0 percent points and a final score of 52.6%, the absolute majority of the votes cast. Their coalition partners, the CDU under Franz Amrehn also achieved a considerable increase in votes of 7.3 percentage points and a score of 37.7% of the vote.

The only opposition party in West Berlin, the FDP collapsed from 12.8% to 3.8% leaving just the SPD and CDU represented in parliament. Due to the critical situation the city was facing, Brandt opted to continue the coalition with the CDU. The continuing of this grand coalition meant that for the five years until the next election a parliamentary opposition did not exist in West Berlin.

Summary of the results of the 7 December 1958 election to Berlin's Abgeordnetenhaus
Parties	Votes	%	+/-	Seats	+/-
Social Democratic Party of Germany	850,127	52.6%	+8.0%	78	+14
Christian Democratic Union	609,097	37.7%	+7.3%	55	+11
Free Democratic Party	61,119	3.8%	-9.0%	0	-19
German Party	53,912	3.3%	-1.6%	0	
Socialist Unity Party	31,572	1.9%	-0.8%	0	
Free People's Party	10,681	0.7%	+0.7%	0	
Total	1,632,540	100%		133	+6
Source: Wahl zum Abgeordnetenhaus von Berlin 1958
