= 1975 West Berlin state election =

West Berlin election

- 2 March 1975

All 147 seats in the House of Representatives 74 seats needed for a majority
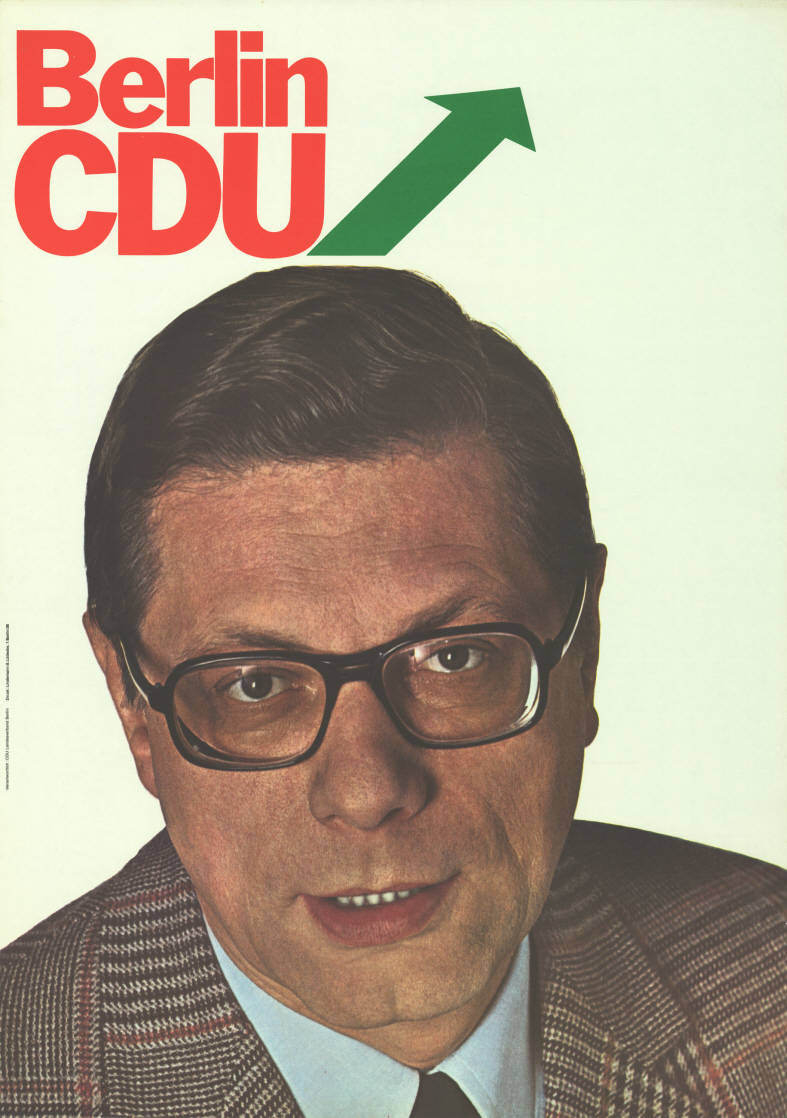

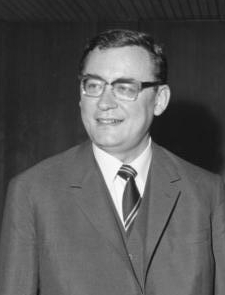
	Majority party	Minority party	Third party
Leader	Peter Lorenz	Klaus Schütz
Party	CDU	SPD	FDP
Last election	54 seats, 38.2%	73 seats, 50.4%	11 seats, 8.4%
Seats before	54	73	11
Seats after	69	67	11
Seat change	▲15	▼6	Steady
Popular vote	604,007	585,605	97,969
Percentage	43.9%	42.6%	7.1%
Swing	▲5.7%	▼7.8%	▼1.3%
Mayor before election
Klaus Schütz
SPD
Elected Mayor
Klaus Schütz
SPD

The election to the Berlin House of Representatives occurred on March 2, 1975. The election campaign was marked by the kidnapping of the CDU top candidate, Peter Lorenz. Lorenz was kidnapped three days before the election by 2 June Movement who demanded the release of six of their comrades. This left incumbent SPD mayor Klaus Schütz in the somewhat awkward position of having to determine, so to speak, the life of his challenger. After the federal government gave in to the demands by the 2 June Movement, Peter Lorenz was released two days after the election.

In the election the SPD lost 7.8 percentage points in the election, and with 42.6% of the vote lost its absolute majority that it had held since 1954. The election results gave the power of determining the governing coalition to the FDP. After negotiations, incumbent SPD mayor Klaus Schütz was able to be re-elected at the head of an SPD-FDP government.

Summary of the results of the 2 March 1975 election to Berlin's Abgeordnetenhaus
Party	Votes	%	+/–	Seats	+/–
Christian Democratic Union	604,007	43.91	▲5.7%	69	▲15
Social Democratic Party of Germany	585,605	42.57	▼7.8%	67	▼6
Free Democratic Party	97,969	7.12	▼1.3%	11	Steady
Confederation of Free Germany	46,691	3.39	▲3.4%	0	Steady
Socialist Unity Party of West Berlin	25,105	1.83	▼0.5%	0	Steady
Communist Party of Germany	10,125	0.74	▲0.7%	0	Steady
Others	6,020	0.44	▼0.1%	0	Steady
Total	1,375,522	100.00	–	147	–
Source: German Wikipedia

- https://www.nytimes.com/1975/01/26/archives/brandt-joins-state-election-drives.html
- https://www.nytimes.com/1975/03/02/archives/west-berlin-voting-today-as-candidate-is-still-held.html
