= 1981 West Berlin state election =

State election in West Germany

Summary of the results of the 10 May 1981 election to Berlin's Abgeordnetenhaus
Parties	Votes	%	+/-	Seats	+/-
Christian Democratic Union	605,265	48.0%	+3.6%	65	+2
Social Democratic Party of Germany	483,778	38.3%	-4.4%	51	-10
Alternative List	90,653	7.2%	+3.5%	9	+9
Free Democratic Party	70,529	5.6%	-2.5%	7	-4
Socialist Unity Party of West Berlin	8,176	0.6%	-0.5%	0	
Green List Berlin	3,765	0.3%	+0.3%	0	
Total	1,291,842	100%		132	-3
