= 1967 West Berlin state election =

State election in West Germany

The election to the Berlin House of Representatives on March 12, 1967, was the first election after the resignation of Willy Brandt as mayor, who, due to the forming of a CDU-SPD coalition on a national level, had become Vice-Chancellor and Foreign Minister.

Brandt's successor in Berlin was Heinrich Albertz, who assumed the role of mayor on December 14, 1966, he was selected as the top candidate for the SPD in this election.

Albertz had to manage a difficult legacy, Brandt was overwhelmingly popular in Berlin upon his leaving to become Vice-Chancellor and had become somewhat of an icon among the populace, according to surveys, about 90% of Berlin were happy. Albertz managed nevertheless to make our own contributions in the relatively short time between Brandt resignation and the election, Albertz had worked closely with Brandt since 1963 as his second-in-command within the SPD which benefited him as he had been able to familiarize himself with some of his responsibilities.

Despite losing five percentage points the SPD still recorded an impressive 56.9% of the vote and another absolute majority. The opposition CDU, who for the third time in a row had selected Franz Amrehn as their top candidate, recorded a vote increase of 4.1 percentage points to win 32.9% of votes. The FDP, as coalition partner of the SPD suffered minor losses.

Despite the SPD again winning an overall majority, Albertz decided to re-enter into a coalition with the FDP and was re-elected as mayor.

Summary of the results of the 12 March 1967 election to Berlin's Abgeordnetenhaus
Parties	Votes	%	+/-	Seats	+/-
Social Democratic Party of Germany	829,694	56.9%	-5.0%	81	-8
Christian Democratic Union	479,945	32.9%	+4.1%	47	+6
Free Democratic Party	103,973	7.1%	-0.8%	9	-1
Socialist Unity Party of Germany - West Berlin	29,925	2.0%	+0.6%	0	
Other Parties	15,507	1.1%	+1.1%	0	
Total	1,481,674	100%		137	-3
