= 1963 West Berlin state election =

Election in Germany

The election to the West Berlin House of Representatives on 17 February 1963 was the first election in Berlin since the construction of the Berlin Wall.

The top candidate of the SPD was again the mayor Willy Brandt while the CDU chose deputy mayor Franz Amrehn.

The SPD won a major election victory: 61.9% of the vote, a vote increase of 9.3 percentage points, it achieved its second-best result since the end of the second world war. Furthermore, the SPD won all 80 direct constituency seats. Their current coalition partner, the CDU, saw its vote share fall by 8.9 percentage points to 28.8% of the votes. The FDP re-entered parliament after winning 7.9% of the vote.

Analysts point to a number of factors as to why the SPD won such a large electoral victory. Many point to Brandt's high energy speeches and appearances in connection to the building of the wall, while many voters saw the CDU's crisis management was unconvincing and was thus punished by the voters. Another factor was that, shortly before the election, Willy Brandt had to cancel a meeting with Soviet Secretary General Khrushchev after coming under pressure from the CDU, some voters blamed the CDU for scuppering chances of reducing tensions with the Soviets.

Much like the last election, the SPD had another large majority, this time however Brandt chose not to form a coalition with the CDU, he did however form an SPD-FDP coalition, leaving the CDU in opposition.

Summary of the results of the 17 February 1963 election to Berlin's House of Representatives
Parties	Votes	%	+/-	Seats	+/-
Social Democratic Party of Germany	962,197	61.9%	+9.3%	89	+11
Christian Democratic Union	448,459	28.8%	-8.9%	41	-14
Free Democratic Party	123,382	7.9%	+4.1%	10	+10
Socialist Unity Party of Germany - West Berlin	20,929	1.4%	-0.5%	0	
Total	1,572,027	100%		140	+7
Source: Wahl zum Abgeordnetenhaus von Berlin 1963
