= 1989 West Berlin state election =

West German election

- 29 January 1989

All 138 seats of the Abgeordnetenhaus of Berlin 70 seats needed for a majority
- Turnout: 1,220,423 (79.6%)
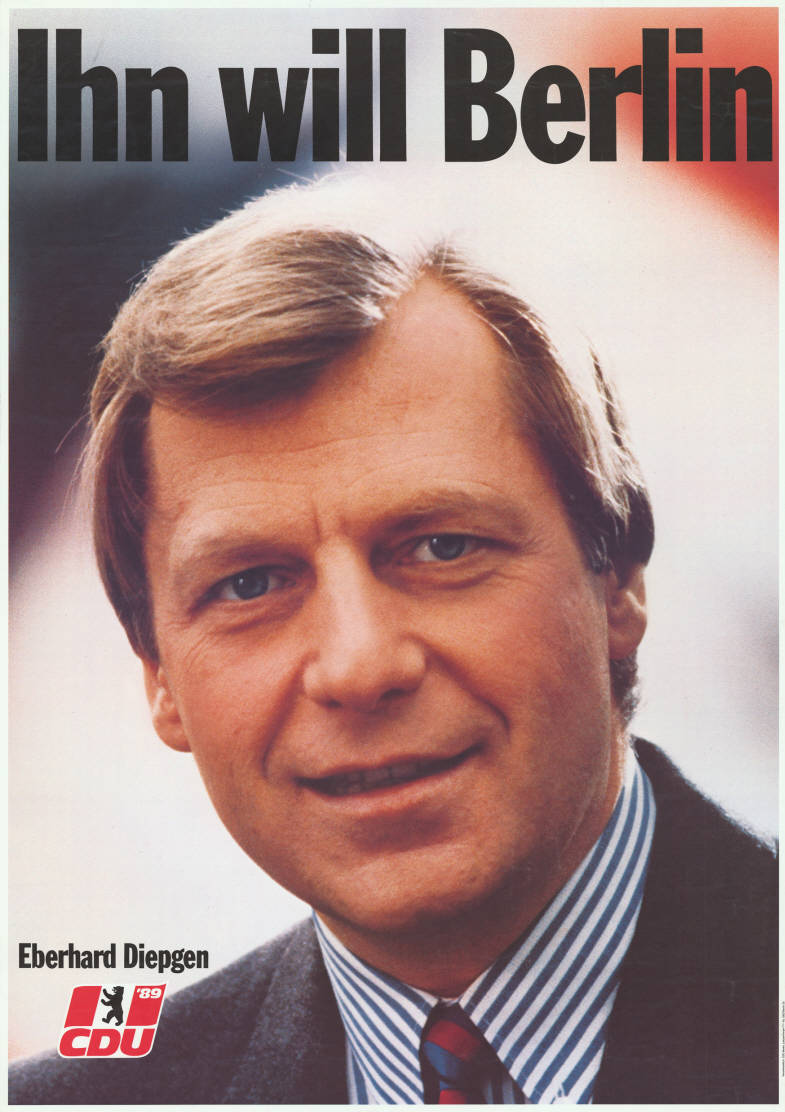

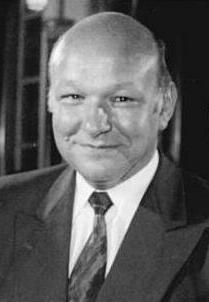
	First party	Second party	Third party
Leader	Eberhard Diepgen	Walter Momper
Party	CDU	SPD	Greens
Last election	69 seats, 46.4%	48 seats, 32.4%	15 seats, 10.6%
Seats won	55	55	17
Seat change	▼14	▲7	▲2
Popular vote	453,211	448,203	141,529
Percentage	37.7%	37.3%	11.8%
Swing	▼8.7%	▲4.9%	▲1.2%
	Fourth party	Fifth party
Party	REP	FDP
Last election	Did not exist	12 seats, 8.5%
Seats won	11	0
Seat change	▲11	▼12
Popular vote	90,222	47,153
Percentage	7.5%	3.9%
Swing	New	▼4.6%
- Results for single-member constituencies.
Governing Mayor before election
Eberhard Diepgen
CDU
Elected Governing Mayor
Walter Momper
SPD

The 1989 West Berlin state election was held on 29 January 1989 to elect the members of the 11th Abgeordnetenhaus of Berlin. This was the last election held in West Berlin before the reunification of Germany and Berlin. The CDU suffered a severe defeat under its top candidate, the Governing Mayor Eberhard Diepgen, who had been in office since 1984. It fell by 8.7 percentage points and ended up with 37.7% of the votes just ahead of the SPD, which gained 4.9 percentage points to 37.3% under its lead candidate Walter Momper. Together with the Alternative List (AL), this resulted in a clear majority for a red–green coalition.
