= Gabriele Groneberg =

German politician

Gabrielle Groneberg
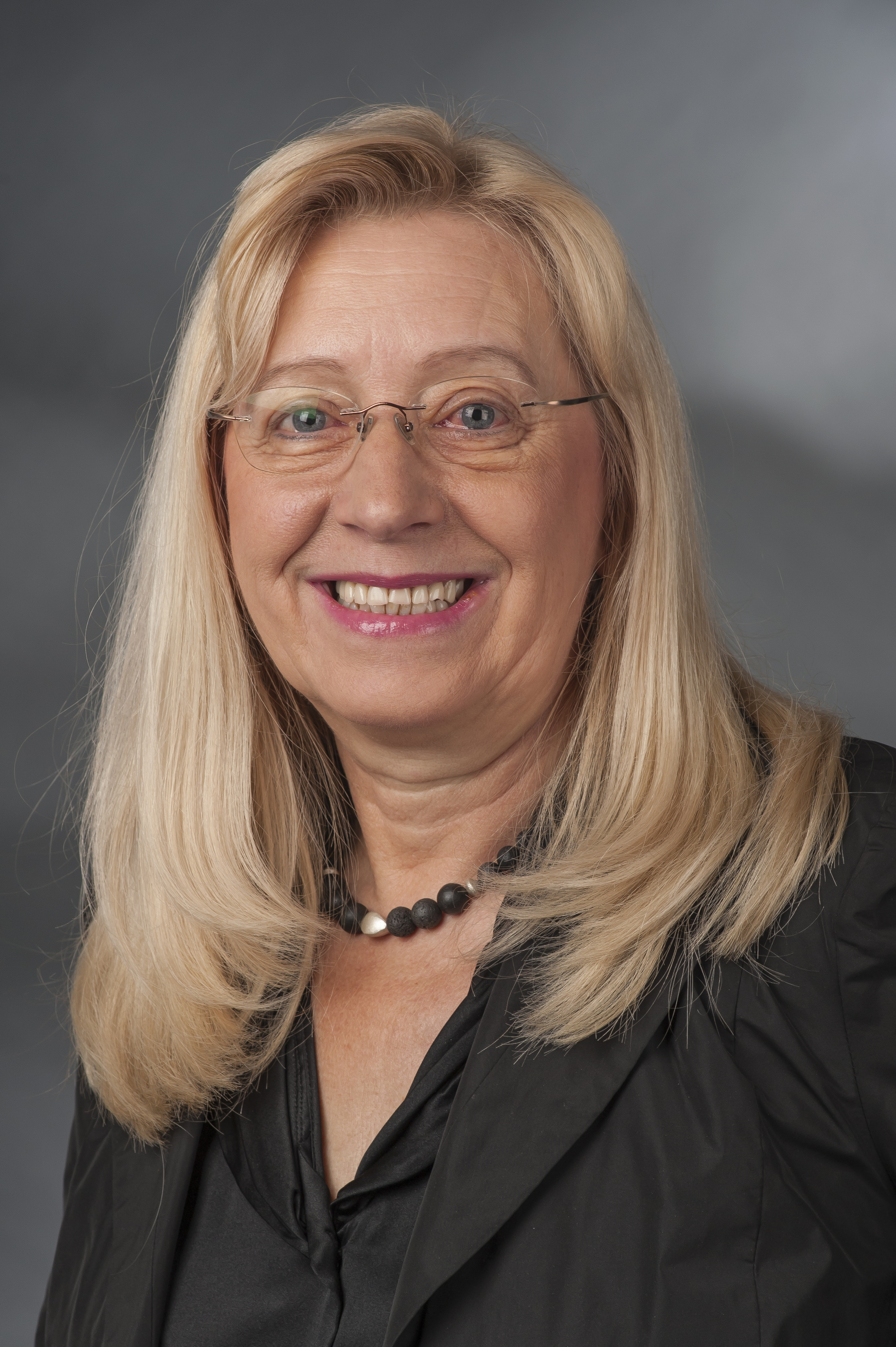
- Groneberg in 2014

Member of Bundestag; from Lower Saxony
- In office 11 February 2014 – 24 October 2017
- Preceded by: Sebastian Edathy
- Succeeded by: Maik Beermann
- Constituency: Nienburg II – Schaumburg
- In office 26 June 2012 – 22 October 2013
- Preceded by: Garrelt Duin
- Succeeded by: Johann Saathoff
- Constituency: Aurich – Emden
- In office 17 October 2002 – 27 October 2009
- Constituency: State list

Member of the Landtag of Lower Saxony
- In office 16 December 1998 – 23 October 2002
- Preceded by: Gertraude Kruse
- Succeeded by: Peter Raske
- Constituency: Laatzen
- In office 13 November 1996 – 30 March 1998
- Constituency: State list

Personal details
- Born: 19 September 1955 (age 71) Essen, West Germany
- Party: Social Democratic
- Children: 2

Gabrielle Groneberg (born 19 September 1955) is a German politician from the Social Democratic Party.

== Political career ==
She was a Member of the Bundestag from 2002 to 2009, and then 2012 to 2013, then 2014 to 2017.

In the four federal elections from 2002 to 2013, Groneberg was also the SPD candidate for the direct mandate in the Cloppenburg-Vechta constituency, a stronghold of the CDU. She was defeated by the CDU candidates every time.
