= Beermann =

Beermann is a German surname. Notable people with the surname include:

- Frank Beermann (born 1965), German conductor
- Janine Beermann (born 1983), German field hockey player
- Maik Beermann (born 1981), German politician
- Ralph F. Beermann (1912–1977), American politician
- Timo Beermann (born 1990), German footballer
