= Georg Kühling =

German politician

Member of the Bundestag; for Vechta – Cloppenburg
- In office 7 September 1949 – 6 October 1953
- Preceded by: Constituency established
- Succeeded by: Kurt Schmücker

Member of the Landtag of Lower Saxony
- In office 9 December 1946 – 28 March 1947
- Preceded by: Constituency established
- Succeeded by: Multi-member district
- Constituency: State list

Personal details
- Born: 18 November 1886 Visbek, Germany
- Died: 26 March 1963 (aged 76) Visbek, West Germany
- Party: Christian Democratic Union

Georg Kühling (18 November 1886 – 26 March 1963) was a German politician of the Christian Democratic Union (CDU) and former member of the German Bundestag.

== Political career ==
From 23 May 1946 to 6 November 1946, he was a member of the appointed Oldenburg State Parliament and subsequently from 9 December 1946 to 28 March 1947 of the appointed Lower Saxony State Parliament. He was a member of the German Bundestag from its first election in 1949 until 1953. He was a directly elected member of parliament for the constituency of Vechta – Cloppenburg.

== Literature ==
Herbst, Ludolf; Jahn, Bruno (2002). Vierhaus, Rudolf (ed.). Biographisches Handbuch der Mitglieder des Deutschen Bundestages. 1949–2002 [Biographical Handbook of the Members of the German Bundestag. 1949–2002] (in German). München: De Gruyter - De Gruyter Saur. p. 1715. ISBN 978-3-11-184511-1.
