= Manfred Carstens =

German politician

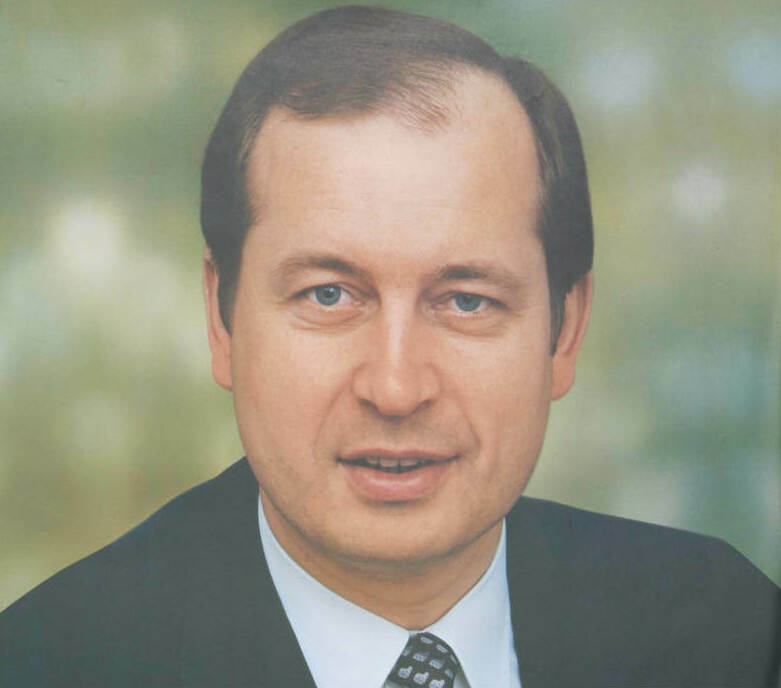
- Carstens in 1980

Member of the Bundestag
- In office 13 December 1972 – 18 October 2005
- Preceded by: Kurt Schmücker
- Succeeded by: Franz-Josef Holzenkamp
- Constituency: Cloppenburg (1972–1980); Cloppenburg – Vechta (1980–2005)

Personal details
- Born: 23 February 1943 (age 83) Molbergen, Germany
- Party: Christian Democratic Union
- Children: 3

Manfred Carstens (born 23 February 1943) is a German politician of Christian Democratic Union of Germany (CDU).

== Biography ==
In Emstek Carstens worked for a local bank. Carstens worked as a German politician for party CDU. From 1972 to 2005 Carstens was a member of German Bundestag. Carstens is married and has three children.
