= Aurich – Emden =

Federal electoral district of Germany

24 Aurich – Emden
- Former electoral district for the Bundestag
- Aurich – Emden in 2025
- State: Lower Saxony
- Population: 239,600 (2019)
- Electorate: 191,846 (2021)
- Major settlements: Emden; Aurich; Norden
- Area: 1,399.7 km^{2}

Former electoral district
- Created: 1949; 1980 (re-established)
- Abolished: 1965
- Party: SPD
- Member: Johann Saathoff
- Elected: 2013, 2017, 2021, 2025

Aurich – Emden is an electoral constituency (German: Wahlkreis) represented in the Bundestag. It elects one member via first-past-the-post voting. Under the current constituency numbering system, it is designated as constituency 24. It is located in northwestern Lower Saxony, comprising the city of Emden and the district of Aurich.

Aurich – Emden was created for the inaugural 1949 federal election. It was abolished in 1965 and re-established in the 1980 federal election. Since 2013, it has been represented by Johann Saathoff of the Social Democratic Party (SPD).

== Geography ==
Aurich – Emden is located in northwestern Lower Saxony. As of the 2021 federal election, it comprises the independent city of Emden and the district of Aurich.

== History ==
Aurich – Emden was created in 1949. In the 1949 election, it was Lower Saxony constituency 1. From 1953 to 1965, it was constituency number 23. Originally, it comprised the city of Emden and the districts of Aurich and Norden, the latter of which was incorporated into the former in 1977.

Aurich – Emden was abolished in the 1965 election. The city of Emden and the Norden district became part of the Emden – Leer constituency, while the Aurich district became part of the Wilhelmshaven constituency.

Aurich – Emden was re-established in the 1980 election. Thereafter, it was constituency 19. In the 1998 election, it became constituency 25; it has been constituency 24 since the 2013 election. Its borders have not changed since its re-establishment.

== Members ==
The constituency has been held continuously by the Social Democratic Party (SPD) throughout both its incarnations. It is a traditional stronghold of the SPD, often one of the party's safest constituencies. Its first representative was Georg Peters, who served from 1949 until the constituency's abolition in 1965. After its re-establishment, it was won by Carl Ewen, who represented it until 1994. He was succeeded by Jann-Peter Janssen, who served until 2005; he was in turn succeeded by Garrelt Duin. Johann Saathoff was elected in 2013, and re-elected in 2017 and 2021.

Election	Member	Party	%
1949	Georg Peters	SPD	35.5
1953	Georg Peters	SPD	43.0
1957	Georg Peters	SPD	48.6
1961	Georg Peters	SPD	48.6
Abolished (1965–1980)
1980	Carl Ewen	SPD	62.4
1983	Carl Ewen	SPD	57.1
1987	Carl Ewen	SPD	58.7
1990	Carl Ewen	SPD	56.9
1994	Jann-Peter Janssen	SPD	57.1
1998	Jann-Peter Janssen	SPD	59.6
2002	Jann-Peter Janssen	SPD	61.4
2005	Garrelt Duin	SPD	58.3
2009	Garrelt Duin	SPD	44.4
2013	Johann Saathoff	SPD	50.3
2017	Johann Saathoff	SPD	49.6
2021	Johann Saathoff	SPD	52.8
2025	Johann Saathoff	SPD	41.2

== Election results ==
=== 2025 election ===
Federal election (2025): Aurich – Emden
Notes:	Blue background denotes the winner of the electorate vote. Pink background denotes a candidate elected from their party list. Yellow background denotes an electorate win by a list member, or other incumbent. A ✓ or ✗ denotes status of any incumbent, win or lose respectively.						
Party	Candidate	Votes	%	±%	Party votes	%	±%
SPD	✓ Johann Saathoff	63,565	41.2	▼11.7	44,286	28.6	▼14.7
CDU	Joachim Kleen	34,069	22.1	▲4.3	36,007	23.3	▲5.6
AfD	Arno Arndt	31,160	20.2		32,478	21.0	▲12.8
Left	Johann Erdwiens	8,949	5.8	▲2.2	11,682	7.6	▲4.1
Greens	Gunnar Ott	7,791	5.0	▼4.3	12,748	8.2	▼4.7
BSW					6,446	4.2	
Tierschutzpartei	Diedrich Kleen	4,303	2.8	▼0.3	2,530	1.6	0.0
FDP	Hendrik Hartmann	3,569	2.3	▼6.4	5,052	3.3	▼5.6
FW					1,316	0.9	▼0.4
Independent	Detlev Krüger	1,021	0.7				
PARTEI					642	0.4	0.0
Volt					594	0.4	▲0.2
dieBasis					388	0.3	▼0.5
Pirates					249	0.2	▼0.2
BD					161	0.1	
Humanists					72	0.0	0.0
MLPD					34	0.0	0.0
Informal votes		1,282			1,024		
Total valid votes		154,427			154,685		
Turnout		155,709	82.0	▲10.2			
SPD hold	Majority	29,496	18.9	▼16.2			

=== 2021 election ===
Federal election (2021): Aurich – Emden
Notes:	Blue background denotes the winner of the electorate vote. Pink background denotes a candidate elected from their party list. Yellow background denotes an electorate win by a list member, or other incumbent. A ✓ or ✗ denotes status of any incumbent, win or lose respectively.						
Party	Candidate	Votes	%	±%	Party votes	%	±%
SPD	✓ Johann Saathoff	71,596	52.8	▲3.2	59,038	43.3	▲5.5
CDU	Joachim Kleen	24,019	17.7	▼9.9	24,066	17.7	▼10.4
Greens	Stefan Maas	12,652	9.3	▲2.3	17,668	13.0	▲5.5
FDP	Sarah Buss	11,798	8.7	▲3.8	12,113	8.9	▲1.7
AfD					11,173	8.2	▼0.9
Left	Friedrich-Bernd Albers	4,861	3.6	▼3.2	4,671	3.4	▼3.8
FW	Detlev Krüger	4,205	3.1	▲0.7	1,769	1.3	▲0.8
Tierschutzpartei	Diedrich Kleen	4,162	3.1		2,220	1.6	▲0.8
dieBasis	David Frerichs	2,156	1.6		1,027	0.8	
PARTEI					1,130	0.8	▲0.1
Pirates					430	0.3	▼0.1
Volt					198	0.1	
Team Todenhöfer					149	0.1	
NPD					147	0.1	▼0.1
Independent	Anton Lenz	112	0.1				
du.					86	0.1	
Humanists					86	0.1	
ÖDP					82	0.1	0.0
V-Partei3					65	0.0	▼0.1
DKP					34	0.0	0.0
LKR					24	0.0	
MLPD					18	0.0	0.0
Informal votes		2,286			1,653		
Total valid votes		135,561			136,194		
Turnout		137,847	71.9	▼2.6			
SPD hold	Majority	47,577	35.1	▲13.1			

=== 2017 election ===
Federal election (2017): Aurich – Emden
Notes:	Blue background denotes the winner of the electorate vote. Pink background denotes a candidate elected from their party list. Yellow background denotes an electorate win by a list member, or other incumbent. A ✓ or ✗ denotes status of any incumbent, win or lose respectively.						
Party	Candidate	Votes	%	±%	Party votes	%	±%
SPD	✓ Johann Saathoff	69,231	49.6	▼0.7	53,353	37.8	▼6.0
CDU	Reinhard Hegewald	38,531	27.6	▼4.8	39,552	28.0	▼4.4
AfD					12,877	9.1	▲6.0
Greens	Garrelt Agena	9,787	7.0	▼2.6	10,503	7.4	▼0.9
Left	Marcus Stahl	9,403	6.7	▲1.9	10,142	7.2	▲2.2
FDP	Uwe Ewen	6,882	4.9	▲3.4	10,079	7.1	▲3.9
FW	Alrich Bartels	3,326	2.4	▲1.0	760	0.5	0.0
Pirates	Michael-Tillmann Berndt	2,304	1.7		568	0.4	▼1.0
Tierschutzpartei					1,162	0.8	0.0
PARTEI					961	0.7	
NPD					357	0.3	▼0.7
BGE					191	0.1	
V-Partei³					160	0.1	
DM					136	0.1	
DiB					123	0.1	
ÖDP					77	0.1	
DKP					35	0.0	
MLPD					35	0.0	0.0
Informal votes		3,092			1,605		
Total valid votes		139,584			141,071		
Turnout		142,676	74.5	▲4.2			
SPD hold	Majority	30,700	22.0	▲4.0			

=== 2013 election ===
Federal election (2013): Aurich – Emden
Notes:	Blue background denotes the winner of the electorate vote. Pink background denotes a candidate elected from their party list. Yellow background denotes an electorate win by a list member, or other incumbent. A ✓ or ✗ denotes status of any incumbent, win or lose respectively.						
Party	Candidate	Votes	%	±%	Party votes	%	±%
SPD	Johann Saathoff	66,348	50.2	▲5.9	58,080	43.8	▲5.1
CDU	Heiko Schmelzle	42,737	32.4	▲6.5	43,026	32.5	▲7.9
Greens	Thilo Hoppe	12,627	9.6	▼1.5	11,028	8.3	▼2.1
Left	Marco Notman	6,373	4.8	▼5.3	6,588	5.0	▼6.5
FDP	Stephan Bünting	2,085	1.6	▼5.6	4,323	3.3	▼7.2
AfD					4,136	3.1	
Pirates					1,900	1.4	▼0.1
FW	Klaus Klitzsch	1,869	1.4		713	0.5	
NPD					1,259	0.9	▼0.4
Tierschutzpartei					1,065	0.8	0.0
PBC					160	0.1	
REP					110	0.1	
PRO					109	0.1	
MLPD					35	0.0	0.0
Informal votes		2,217			1,724		
Total valid votes		132,039			132,532		
Turnout		134,256	70.3	▲0.3			
SPD hold	Majority	23,611	17.8	▼0.8			

=== 2009 election ===
Federal election (2009): Aurich – Emden
Notes:	Blue background denotes the winner of the electorate vote. Pink background denotes a candidate elected from their party list. Yellow background denotes an electorate win by a list member, or other incumbent. A ✓ or ✗ denotes status of any incumbent, win or lose respectively.						
Party	Candidate	Votes	%	±%	Party votes	%	±%
SPD	✓ Garrelt Duin	57,876	44.4	▼13.9	50,682	38.8	▼17.1
CDU	Reinhard Hegewald	33,706	25.8	▼1.3	32,155	24.6	▼0.3
Left	Martin Heilemann	13,213	10.1	▲6.2	14,978	11.5	▲7.0
Greens	Thilo Hoppe	14,451	11.1	▲4.9	13,641	10.4	▲4.2
FDP	Cornelia Debus	9,314	7.1	▲4.0	13,619	10.4	▲4.2
Pirates					2,015	1.5	
NPD	Horst Wagener	1,886	1.4	▲0.3	1,712	1.3	▲0.2
Tierschutzpartei					1,042	0.8	▲0.2
RRP					642	0.5	
DVU					123	0.1	
ÖDP					123	0.1	
MLPD					32	0.0	0.0
Informal votes		2,439			2,121		
Total valid votes		130,446			130,764		
Turnout		132,885	70.0	▼7.2			
SPD hold	Majority	24,170	18.5	▼12.7			

=== 2005 election ===
Federal election (2005):Aurich – Emden
Notes:	Blue background denotes the winner of the electorate vote. Pink background denotes a candidate elected from their party list. Yellow background denotes an electorate win by a list member, or other incumbent. A ✓ or ✗ denotes status of any incumbent, win or lose respectively.						
Party	Candidate	Votes	%	±%	Party votes	%	±%
SPD	Garrelt Duin	82,618	58.3	▼3.1	79,448	55.9	▼5.8
CDU	Hermann Reinders	38,467	27.1	▲1.7	35,368	24.9	▲0.9
Greens	Thilo Hoppe	8,748	6.2	▼0.9	8,868	6.2	▲0.7
Left	Heiko Moll	5,516	3.9	▲2.5	6,357	4.5	▲3.5
FDP	Hanno Kunz	4,441	3.1	▼1.5	8,800	6.2	▲0.2
NPD	Karl-Heinz Besemann	1,660	1.2		1,606	1.	▲0.9
Tierschutzpartei					815	0.6	▲0.2
GRAUEN					405	0.3	▲0.2
Independent	Kea Reif	360	0.3				
PBC					270	0.2	0.0
Pro German Center – Pro D-Mark Initiative					147	0.1	
MLPD					80	0.1	
BüSo					62	0.0	0.0
Informal votes		2,689			2,273		
Total valid votes		141,810			142,226		
Turnout		144,499	77.3	▼2.4			
SPD hold	Majority	44,151	31.2				
