= Silvia Breher =

German politician (born 1973)

Silvia Breher MdB
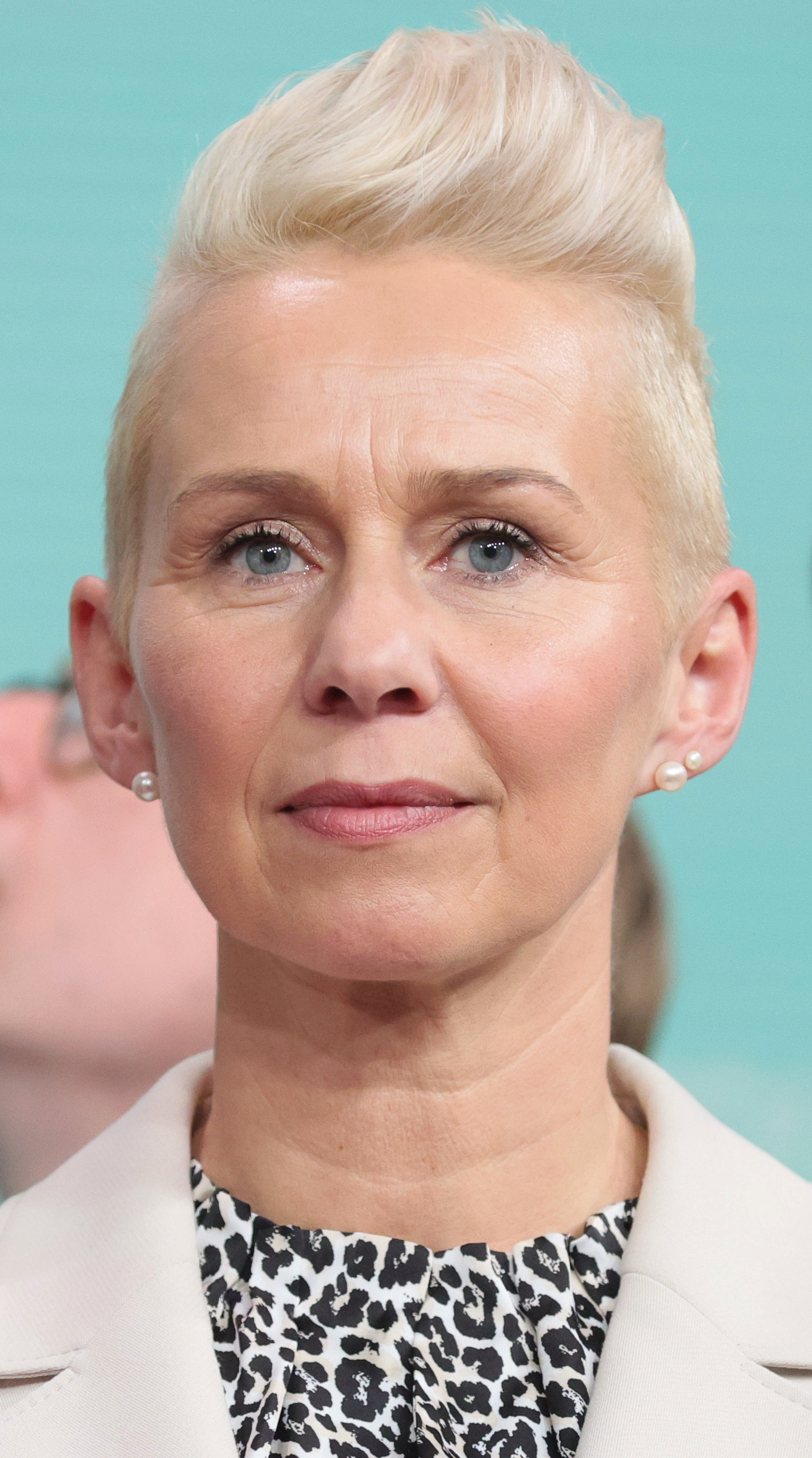
- Breher in 2025

Deputy Leader of the Christian Democratic Union
- Incumbent
- Assumed office 22 November 2019 Serving with Volker Bouffier, Julia Klöckner, Armin Laschet and Thomas Strobl
- Leader: Annegret Kramp-Karrenbauer; Armin Laschet; Friedrich Merz
- Preceded by: Ursula von der Leyen

Member of the Bundestag; for Cloppenburg – Vechta
- Incumbent
- Assumed office 24 October 2017
- Preceded by: Franz-Josef Holzenkamp

Personal details
- Born: Silvia Maria Lucke; 23 July 1973 (age 53) Löningen, West Germany
- Party: Christian Democratic Union
- Children: 3
- Education: Osnabrück University
- Website: silvia-breher.de

Silvia Maria Breher (née Lucke; born 23 July 1973) is a German lawyer and politician of the Christian Democratic Union (CDU) who has been serving as a Member of the Bundestag for the constituency of Cloppenburg – Vechta since the 2017 federal election.

In addition to her work in parliament, Breher has been serving as Parliamentary State Secretary at the Federal Ministry of Food and Agriculture in the government of Chancellor Friedrich Merz since 2025.

Already since 2019, Breher has been serving as deputy chair of the CDU, under the leadership of successive chairs Annegret Kramp-Karrenbauer (2019–2021), Armin Laschet (2021–2022) and Merz.

== Early life and career ==
Breher was born in Löningen and grew up on a farm in Lindern. After gaining her Abitur at Copernicus Gymnasium in Löningen she studied law at the Osnabrück University. At the end of 2000 she began practicing as a self-employed lawyer. From 2011 till 2017 she was the Chief Executive of the "Kreislandsvolkverbandes Vechta", the local farmers' union.

== Political career ==
=== Career in local politics ===
Breher is a member of the Christian Democratic Union and of her local CDU organisation in Cloppenburg. Between 2014 and 2015 she was a member of the CDU Commission Nachhaltig leben – Lebensqualität bewahren. Since 2018 Breher has been the leader of the Cloppenburg CDU district association and the Löningen CDU association. In March 2019 she was elected leader of the Oldenburg CDU state association and thus member of the State Executive of the CDU in Lower Saxony, under the leadership of chairman Bernd Althusmann.

=== Member of the German Parliament (2017–present) ===
As successor of Franz-Josef Holzenkamp, Breher was selected as the CDU candidate for Cloppenburg – Vechta for the 2017 federal elections. She subsequently won the election with the highest vote share in the country, 57.7 percent. Her constituency is seen as a CDU safe seat, with her party winning the constituency uninterrupted since 1953. In parliament, she was a member of the Committee on Food and Agriculture (2018–2021) as well as a member of the Committee on Family, Senior Citizens, Women and Youth (since 2018).

At the CDU conference in November 2019, Breher was elected as one of the deputy leaders of her party; she succeeded Ursula von der Leyen who had been elected to the Presidency of the European Commission.

Amid the COVID-19 pandemic in Germany, Breher co-chaired – alongside Tobias Hans, Hendrik Hoppenstedt, Yvonne Magwas and Paul Ziemiak – the CDU's first ever digital national convention in 2021.

Ahead of the 2021 elections, CDU chairman Armin Laschet included Breher in his eight-member shadow cabinet for the Christian Democrats' campaign.

== Political positions ==
In September 2017, Breher supported same-sex marriages. In April 2020, she co-signed – alongside around 50 other members of her parliamentary group – a letter to President of the European Commission Ursula von der Leyen which called on the European Union to take in children who were living in migrant camps across Greece.

For the 2021 national elections, Breher endorsed Armin Laschet as the Christian Democrats' joint candidate to succeed Chancellor Angela Merkel.
