= Jann-Peter Janssen =

German politician (1945–2022)

Member of the Bundestag; for Aurich – Emden
- In office 10 November 1994 – 24 January 2005
- Preceded by: Carl Ewen
- Succeeded by: Lars Klingbeil

Personal details
- Born: 12 February 1945 Norden, Hanover, Germany
- Died: 7 December 2022 (aged 77) Ihlow, Lower Saxony, Germany
- Party: Social Democratic
- Children: 2
- Occupation: Shipbuilder

Jann-Peter Janssen (12 February 1945 – 7 December 2022) was a German politician. A member of the Social Democratic Party, he served in the Bundestag from 1994 to 2005.

Janssen died in Ihlow on 7 December 2022, at the age of 77.
