= Katja Keul =

German lawyer and politician

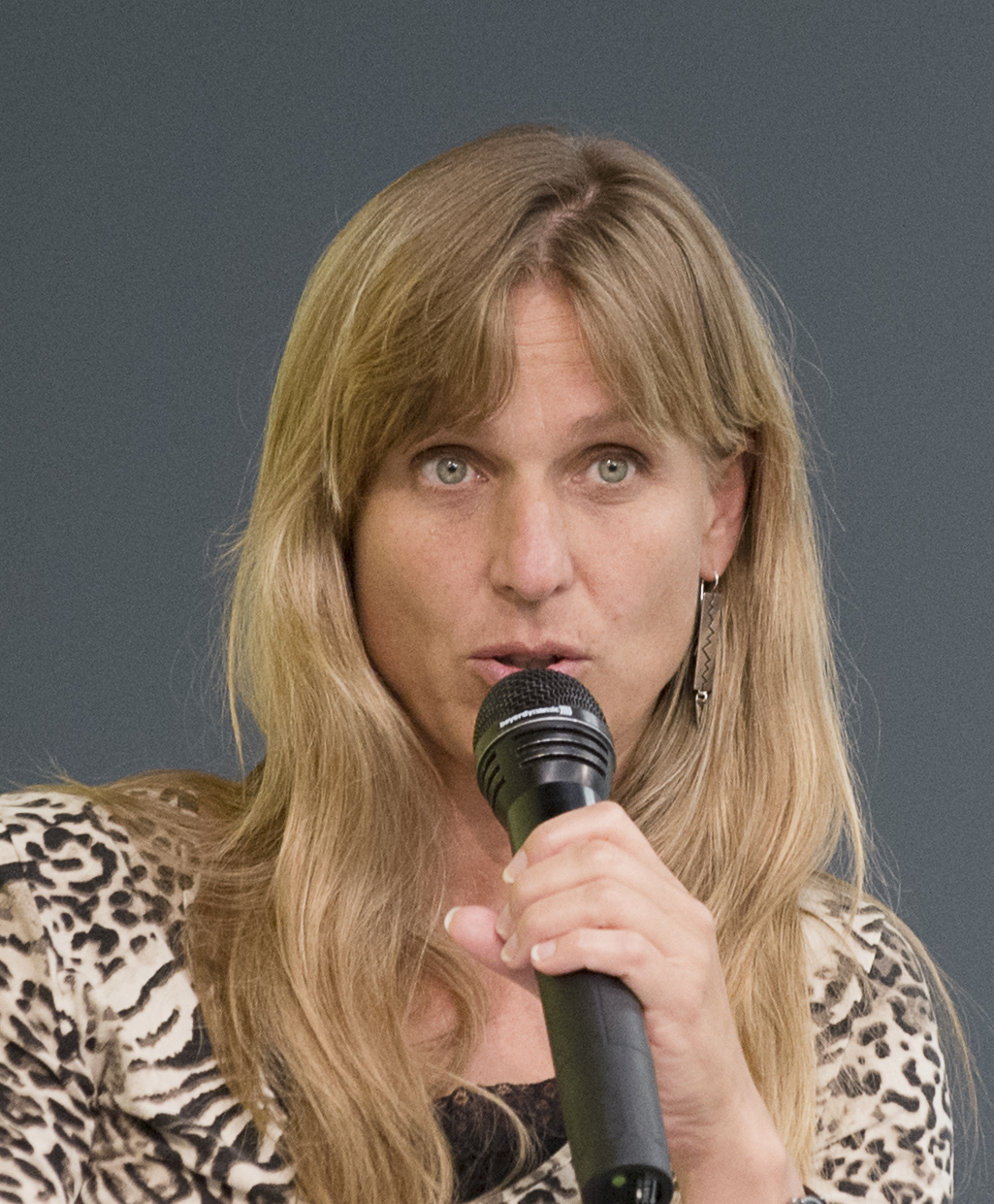
- Katja Keul in 2013

Minister of State
- Incumbent
- Assumed office 2021 Serving with: Tobias Lindner; Anna Lührmann
- Chancellor: Olaf Scholz
- Minister: Annalena Baerbock
- Preceded by: Michelle Müntefering

Member of the Bundestag
- In office 2009–2025

Personal details
- Born: 30 November 1969 (age 56) West Berlin (now Germany)
- Party: Greens
- Education: University of Heidelberg

Katja Keul (née Fehsenfeld, born 30 November 1969) is a German lawyer and politician of Alliance 90/The Greens who served as a member of the German Bundestag from 2009 to 2025, representing the Nienburg II – Schaumburg district. In addition to her work in parliament, she has been Minister of State at the Federal Foreign Office in the government of Chancellor Olaf Scholz since 8 December 2021.

== Education and early career ==
The daughter of a development aid worker, Keul was born in Berlin. She attended schools in Mostaganem, Höxter, Geneva, Jacksonville, Florida, and Nienburg/Weser. From 1989 to 1994 she studied law at the University of Heidelberg and has been working as a lawyer since 1997.

== Political career ==
Keul has been a member of the Green Party since 2006.

Keul first became a member of the German Bundestag in the 2013 elections, representing the Nienburg II – Schaumburg constituency. In parliament, she served on the Committee on Legal Affairs and the Committee on Defense from 2013 until 2021. During that time, she served as her parliamentary group's spokesperson on legal affairs. From 2014 until 2017, she was also part of the parliament's Council of Elders, which – among other duties – determines daily legislative agenda items and assigns committee chairpersons based on party representation. Following the 2017 elections, she joined the Subcommittee on Disarmament, Arms Control and Non-Proliferation.

In addition to her committee assignments, Keul was a member of the German-American Parliamentary Friendship Group. She was also a member of the German delegations to the Parliamentary Assembly of the Organization for Security and Co-operation in Europe from 2014 and to the Franco-German Parliamentary Assembly from 2019.

On 7 June 2011, Keul was among the guests invited to the state dinner hosted by President Barack Obama in honor of Chancellor Angela Merkel at the White House.

In 2019, Keul co-founded a cross-party support group for the Treaty on the Prohibition of Nuclear Weapons.

In the negotiations to form a so-called traffic light coalition of the Social Democratic Party (SPD), the Green Party and the Free Democratic Party (FDP) following the 2021 German elections, Keul was part of her party's delegation in the working group on children, youth and families, co-chaired by Serpil Midyatli, Katrin Göring-Eckardt and Stephan Thomae.

In October 2024, Keul announced that she would not stand in the 2025 federal elections but instead resign from active politics by the end of the parliamentary term.

== Other activities ==
- German Foundation for Peace Research (DSF), Ex-Officio Member of the Board (since 2022)
- German Federal Cultural Foundation, Ex-Officio Member of the Board of Trustees (since 2022)
- German Bar Association (DAV), Member
- EastWest Institute, Member of the Parliamentarians Network for Conflict Prevention
- German Cyclist's Association (ADFC), Member
- German Federation for the Environment and Nature Conservation (BUND), Member
- German Foundation for International Legal Cooperation (IRZ), Member
- International Association of Lawyers against Nuclear Arms (IALANA), Member

== Political positions ==
In 2014, Keul – alongside fellow Green Party parliamentarians Claudia Roth and Hans-Christian Ströbele – lodged a complaint before the Federal Constitutional Court of Germany, arguing that it was unconstitutional for the government to keep the Bundestag in the dark about planned arms deals because it prevented the parliament from fulfilling its role of keeping the government in check. The court ruled that while the government did not have to disclose information about planned defense exports, it did have an obligation to provide the Bundestag with details, on request, once specific arms deals had been approved.

In 2016, Keul and Volker Beck submitted a compensatory draft law to all parliamentary groups in the German Parliament, urging them to remove Paragraph 175 in the penal code, which criminalized homosexual acts.
