= Löningen =

- Town
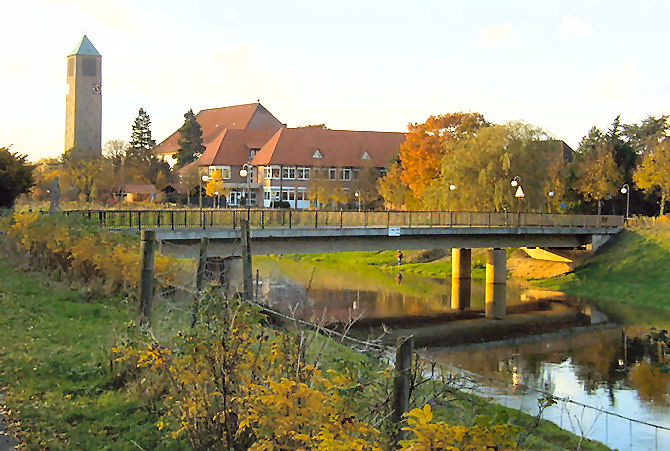
- View of the town

- Flag Coat of arms

- Location of Löningen within Cloppenburg district
- Interactive map of Löningen
- Location within Germany Location within Lower Saxony
- Coordinates: 52°43′N 07°46′E
- Country: Germany
- State: Lower Saxony
- District: Cloppenburg

Government
  - Mayor (2021–26): Burkhard Sibbel

Area
  - Total: 143 km^{2} (55 sq mi)
- Elevation: 24 m (79 ft)

Population (2025-12-31)
  - Total: 14,333
  - Density: 100/km^{2} (260/sq mi)
- Time zone: UTC+01:00 (CET)
  - Summer (DST): UTC+02:00 (CEST)
- Postal codes: 49624
- Dialling codes: 0 54 32
- Vehicle registration: CLP
- Website: www.loeningen.de

Löningen (German: [ˈløːnɪŋən]) is a town in the district of Cloppenburg, in Lower Saxony, Germany. The town is situated on the river Hase, approx. 25 km southwest of Cloppenburg.

== History ==
Löningen originally appeared in 822 as Loingo. The name Löningen was mentioned first in 1147 in a letter to the Bishop von Hildesheim, when the area of Löningen belonged to the Corvey Abbey. Beginning in 1200 Löningen belonged to the Count von Tecklenburg. The diocese Münster absorbed Löningen beginning in 1400. In 1803, church rule ended and Löningen belonged to the Duchy of Oldenburg. From 1810 to 1813 Löningen belonged to the Arrondissement Quakenbrück. After the battle of Leipzig, Löningen returned to Oldenburg.

In 1814 the Duchy of Oldenburg was divided into 25 offices, one of which became Löningen. This was dissolved 1879 and Löningen was assigned to the district of Cloppenburg.

During the World War II, the first bombs in the Löningen area fell in 1940, and in 1945 the Löningen district courthouse was destroyed by bombing. On the 10th and 11 April 1945 British troops arrived and surrounded the German troops on three sides — after which the German troops retreated.

The municipal laws of Löningen were codified on 1 March 1982.

== Economy ==
Main companies in Löningen are German company Remmers, producer of wood preservation colours/solutions, German company Schnetkamp, producer of potatoe products like french fries, and German company Graepel, producer of steel/aluminum products.

== Population ==
Year	Population
1549	ca. 1.100
1651	1.580
1750	2.892
1815	4.713
1837	5.583
1860	5.681
1890	4.687
1895	4.760

Year	Population
1919	4.370
1925	6.435
1939	7.083
1949	10.671
1961	9.500
1972	9.982
1998	13.800

== Mayors ==
- 1890-1917: August Burlage (Zentrum)
- before 1945: Heinrich Holthaus
- 1946: priest Arlinghaus
- 1951–1952: Bernard Berges
- 1952–1960: Wilhelm Bischoff, (CDU)
- 1960–1972: Adolf Richard, (CDU)
- 1972–1986: Kurt Schmücker, (CDU)
- 1986–1991: Heinrich Wesselmann, (CDU)
- 1991–1997: Clemens Winkler, (CDU)
- 1997–2001: Hermann Vorholt, (CDU)
- 2001-2014: Thomas Städtler, Independent
- 2014–2021: Marcus Willen, (CDU)
- since 2021: Burkhard Sibbel

== Notable people ==
- Kurt Schmücker (1919-1996), politician (CDU)
- Silvia Breher (born 1973), politician (CDU)
- Torge Hollmann (born 1982), football player
- Marco di Carli (born 1985), swimmer
