= Torge Hollmann =

German footballer

Personal information
- Date of birth: 28 January 1982 (age 44)
- Place of birth: Löningen, West Germany
- Height: 1.86 m (6 ft 1 in)
- Position: Defender

Youth career
- 1995–1999: VfL Löningen

Senior career*
Years	Team	Apps	(Gls)
1999–2002	SV Meppen	59	(1)
2001–2003	SC Freiburg II	30	(2)
2003–2005	SC Freiburg	1	(0)
2005–2010	SV Wehen Wiesbaden	114	(7)
2007–2010	SV Wehen II	6	(1)
2010–	Eintracht Trier	152	(5)
2011	Eintracht Trier II	2	(0)
Total		364	(16)
- * Club domestic league appearances and goals

Torge Hollmann (born 28 January 1982) is a German former professional footballer who played as a defender.

== Career ==
Hollmann was born in Löningen. He made his debut on the professional league level in the Bundesliga for SC Freiburg on 16 October 2004 when he came on as a substitute in the 81st minute in a game against 1. FC Nürnberg.

In June 2012 he agreed the termination of his contract with SV Wehen Wiesbaden.
