= Franz-Josef Holzenkamp =

German politician

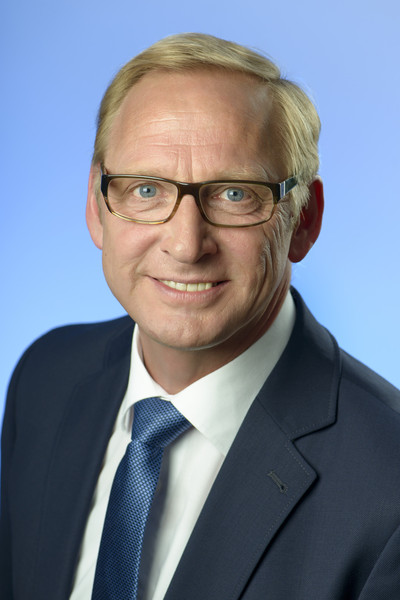
- Holzenkamp in 2013

Member of the Bundestag; for Cloppenburg – Vechta
- In office 18 October 2005 – 24 October 2017
- Preceded by: Manfred Carstens
- Succeeded by: Silvia Breher

Personal details
- Born: 8 January 1960 (age 66) Friesoythe, West Germany
- Party: Christian Democratic Union
- Children: 4

Franz-Josef Holzenkamp (born 8 January 1960) is a German politician of the Christian Democratic Union (CDU) who served in the Bundestag between 2005 and 2017.

== Political career ==
From 2005 until 2017, Holzenkamp was a Member of the German Parliament, representing the Cloppenburg – Vechta constituency. Throughout his tenure, he served on the Committee on Food and Agriculture. He did not run in the 2017 elections; his successor is Silvia Breher.

Since 2017, Holzenkamp has been the President of the Deutscher Raiffeisenverband (DRV).

== Other activities ==
- Landwirtschaftliche Rentenbank, Deputy Chair of the Supervisory Board
- AGRAVIS Raiffeisen AG, Chairman of the Supervisory Board (since 2012)
- LVM-Krankenversicherungs AG, Member of the Supervisory Board (since 1999)
- LVM-Lebensversicherungs AG, Member of the Supervisory Board (since 1999)

== Personal life ==
Holzenkamp is married and has four children.
