= Ludwig Erhard =

Chancellor of West Germany from 1963 to 1966

- Erhard in 1964

Chancellor of Germany (Note: Due to the division of Germany, Ludwig Erhard was Federal Chancellor in West Germany. The term West Germany is only the common English name for the Federal Republic of Germany between its formation on 23 May 1949 and the German reunification through the accession of East Germany on 3 October 1990. The office of chancellor never existed in East Germany.)
- In office 17 October 1963 – 30 November 1966
- President: Heinrich Lübke
- Vice Chancellor: Erich Mende
- Preceded by: Konrad Adenauer
- Succeeded by: Kurt Georg Kiesinger

Leader of the Christian Democratic Union
- In office 23 March 1966 – 23 May 1967
- Bundestag Leader: Rainer Barzel
- Preceded by: Konrad Adenauer
- Succeeded by: Kurt Georg Kiesinger

Vice Chancellor of Germany
- In office 29 October 1957 – 15 October 1963
- Chancellor: Konrad Adenauer
- Preceded by: Franz Blücher
- Succeeded by: Erich Mende

Minister for Economics
- In office 20 September 1949 – 15 October 1963
- Chancellor: Konrad Adenauer
- Preceded by: Office established
- Succeeded by: Kurt Schmücker

Member of the Bundestag; from Baden-Württemberg
- In office 7 September 1949 – 5 May 1977
- Preceded by: Constituency established
- Succeeded by: Paula Riede
- Constituency: Ulm (1949–1972); State list (1972–1977)

Personal details
- Born: Ludwig Wilhelm Erhard; 4 February 1897 Fürth, Bavaria, Germany
- Died: 5 May 1977 (aged 80) Bonn, West Germany
- Resting place: Gmund am Tegernsee
- Party: Independent; Christian Democratic Union (Note: Erhard never formally joined the CDU and so was de jure an independent politician. However, Erhard spent his entire career with the CDU, and was believed to be a member by both the party and the public; his lack of party membership was not widely known until decades after his death.)
- Spouse: Luise Schuster (m. 1923; died 1975)
- Children: 1
- Education: Goethe University Frankfurt (PhD)

Military service
- Allegiance: German Empire
- Branch/service: Imperial German Army; Bavarian Army
- Years of service: 1916–1919
- Rank: Unteroffizier
- Unit: 22nd Royal Bavarian Field Artillery Regiment
- Battles/wars: World War I; Eastern Front; Romanian Campaign; Western Front; Fifth Battle of Ypres

Ludwig Wilhelm Erhard (German: [ˈluːtvɪç ˈʔeːɐ̯haʁt]; 4 February 1897 – 5 May 1977) was a German politician and economist who served as the second chancellor of West Germany from 1963 until 1966. Affiliated with the Christian Democratic Union (CDU), he is known for leading the West German postwar economic reforms and economic recovery (Wirtschaftswunder, German for "economic miracle") in his role as Minister of Economic Affairs under Chancellor Konrad Adenauer from 1949 to 1963. During that period, he promoted the concept of the social market economy (soziale Marktwirtschaft), on which Germany's economic policy in the 21st century continues to be based.

In his tenure as Chancellor, however, Erhard lacked support from Adenauer, who remained chairman of the CDU party until 1966. Erhard failed to win the German public's confidence in his handling of a budget deficit and lacked public support for his direction of foreign policy. His popularity waned, and he resigned his chancellorship on 30 November 1966.

== Early life ==
Ludwig Erhard was born in Fürth, then in the Kingdom of Bavaria, on 4 February 1897. His father Wilhelm Erhard (born 1859) was a Catholic clothing store proprietor, while his mother Augusta adhered to Protestantism. Ludwig had two brothers and a sister, all of whom were raised as Protestants. Ludwig suffered from polio in his third year, resulting in a deformed right foot and forcing him to wear orthopedic shoes for the remainder of his life.

Erhard entered primary school in Fürth at the age of six in 1903 and performed poorly. In 1907, he entered Fürth's Royal Bavarian Vocational High School, where his grades were average. He received his secondary school certificate in 1913. In the following years, he was a commercial apprentice at the Georg Eisenbach textile company in Nuremberg until 1916 and worked thereafter as a retail salesman in his father's draper's shop.

== Military service and university ==
In 1916, Erhard volunteered for the German military. During World War I he was transferred to the 22nd Royal Bavarian Artillery Regiment and trained as a gunner. He first served in the quiet Vosges sector on the Western Front. The regiment was then deployed in the Romanian Campaign on the Eastern Front. He personally saw little combat, but contracted typhus and was sent back to Germany. After he managed a recovery, Erhard returned to his unit. He was badly wounded on his left shoulder, side and leg by an Allied artillery shell on 28 September 1918 during the Fifth Battle of Ypres. Erhard was committed to a military hospital in Recklinghausen, where he underwent seven operations until June 1919. His left arm ended up permanently shorter than his right one.

Due to his injury, he could no longer work as a draper, so Erhard started learning economics in late 1919 at a business college in Nuremberg. He passed the school's exit examination on 22 March 1922 and received a degree in business administration. During his time at school, he developed a friendship with the economist and professor Wilhelm Rieger, to whom Erhard owed much of his convictions of economic liberalism. Thanks to Rieger's intervention, Erhard was able to enroll at the Goethe University Frankfurt in the autumn of 1922. He received his PhD from the university on 12 December 1925 for a dissertation finished in the summer of 1924 under Franz Oppenheimer. Oppenheimer's liberal socialist ideology had a heavy influence on Erhard, especially Oppenheimer's opposition to monopolies. In Frankfurt, he married Luise Schuster, a fellow economist, on 11 December 1923. They had known each other since childhood.

== Early career ==
After his graduation, they moved to Fürth and he became an executive in his father's company in 1925. Erhard spent the next three years as a mostly unemployed academic. His father retired in 1928. The same year, thanks to the help of Rieger and Oppenheimer, Erhard became a part-time research assistant at the Institut für Wirtschaftsbeobachtung der deutschen Fertigware (Economic Observation of the German Finished Goods Industry), a marketing research institute founded by Wilhelm Rudolf Mann and de:Wilhelm Vershofen. Later he became deputy director of the institute.

During World War II he worked on concepts for a postwar peace; however, officially such studies were forbidden by the Nazis, who had declared 'total war'. As a result, Erhard lost his job in 1942, but continued to work on the subject by order of the Reichsgruppe Industrie. He wrote War Finances and Debt Consolidation (orig: Kriegsfinanzierung und Schuldenkonsolidierung) in 1944; in this study, he assumed that Germany had already lost the war. He sent his thoughts to Carl Friedrich Goerdeler, a central figure in the German resistance to Nazism, who recommended Erhard to his comrades. Erhard also discussed his concept with Otto Ohlendorf, deputy secretary of state in the Reichsministerium für Wirtschaft. Ohlendorf himself spoke out for "active and courageous entrepreneurship (aktives und wagemutiges Unternehmertum)", which was intended to replace bureaucratic state planning of the economy after the war.

== Post-war career ==
When the war had finished, Erhard became an economic consultant. Under the Bizone established by the American and British administration in 1947, he led the Sonderstelle Geld und Kredit ("Special Office for Money and Credit"), an expert commission preparing the currency reform in Germany's western zones of occupation. The commission began its deliberations in October 1947, and the following April produced the so-called Homburg plan, elements of which were adopted by the Allies in the currency reform that set the stage for the recovery of the economy.

In April 1948, Erhard was elected director of economics by the Bizonal Economic Council. On 20 June 1948, the Deutsche Mark was introduced. Erhard abolished the price-fixing and production controls that had been enacted by the military administration. This exceeded his authority, but he succeeded with this step. In July 1948, a group of southwest German businessmen attacked the restrictive credit policy of Erhard as Economic Director. While Erhard had designed this policy to assure currency stability and stimulate the economy via consumption, businesses feared the scarcity of investment capital would hinder economic recovery.

== Minister of Economic Affairs ==
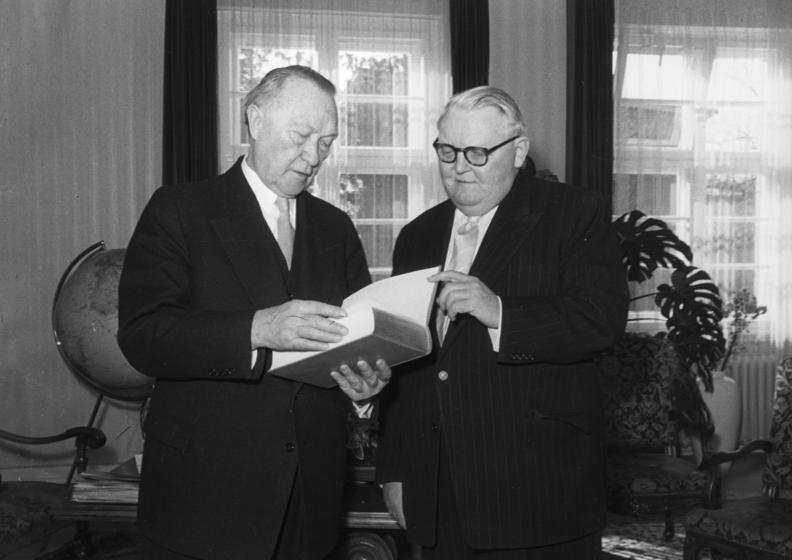
Konrad Adenauer and Ludwig Erhard in 1956

In the first free elections of the federal parliament in September 1949, Erhard was elected in a Baden-Württemberg district as candidate of the Christian Democratic Union. He was appointed Federal Minister for Economic Affairs, a position he would hold for the next 14 years; from 1957 to 1963 he was also the vice-chancellor of Germany. Erhard's financial and economic policies soon proved widely popular as the German economy made a miracle recovery to rapid growth and widespread prosperity in the 1950s, overcoming wartime destruction and successfully integrating millions of refugees from the east.

A staunch believer in economic liberalism, Erhard joined the Mont Pelerin Society in 1950, and used this influential body of liberal economic and political thinkers to test his ideas for the reorganisation of the West German economy. Some of the society's members were members of the Allied High Commission and Erhard was able to make his case directly to them. The Mont Pélerin Society welcomed Erhard because this gave its members a welcome opportunity to have their ideas tested in real life. Alfred Müller-Armack, the secretary of state of Erhard's ministry, helped him guide German economy with theories until the beginning of the 1960s.

Late in the 1950s, Erhard's ministry became involved in the struggle within the society between the European and the Anglo-American factions, and sided with the former. Erhard viewed the market itself as social and supported only a minimum of welfare legislation. However, Erhard suffered a series of decisive defeats in his effort to create a free, competitive economy in 1957; he had to compromise on such key issues as the anti-cartel legislation. Thereafter, the West German economy evolved into a conventional welfare state from the basis that had already been laid in the 1880s by Bismarck. According to Alfred Mierzejewski, the generally accepted view is that Germany has a social market economy, that the post-war German economy has evolved since 1948, but the fundamental characteristics of that economic system have not changed, while in his opinion, the social market economy had begun to fade in 1957, disappearing entirely by the late 1960s.

Erhard was also deeply critical of a bureaucratic-institutional integration of Europe on the model of the European Coal and Steel Community.

== Chancellor of West Germany (1963–1966) ==
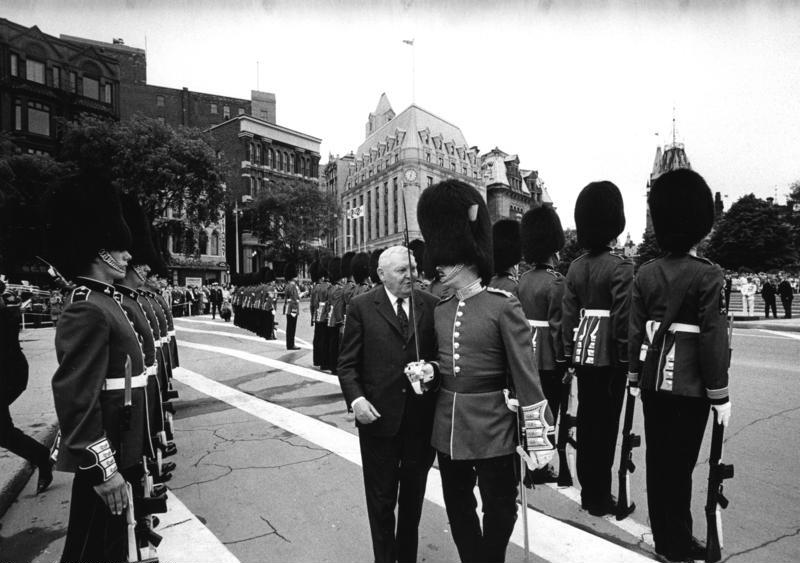
Ludwig Erhard in Ottawa, Ontario, Canada, 1964

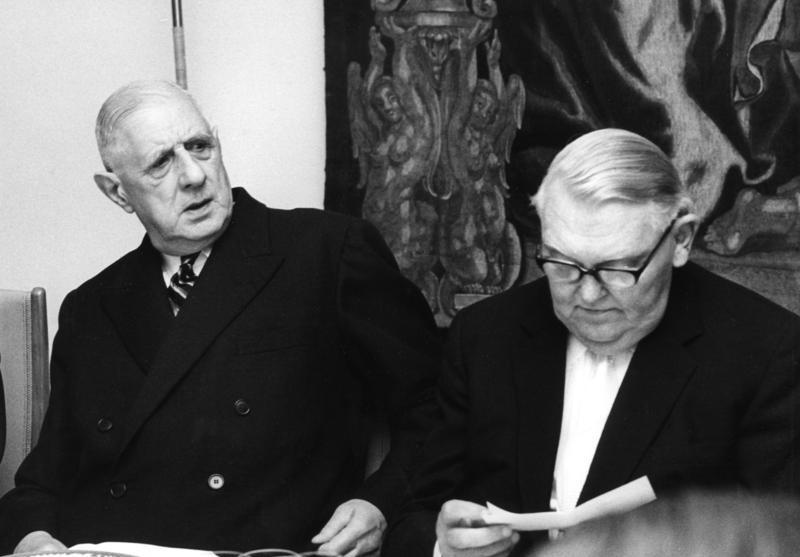
Charles de Gaulle and Ludwig Erhard, 1965

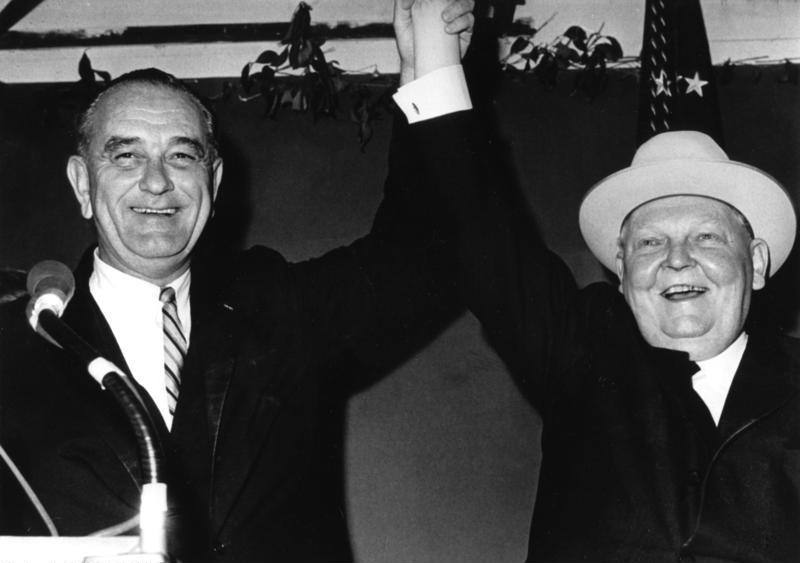
Lyndon B. Johnson and Erhard, December 1963

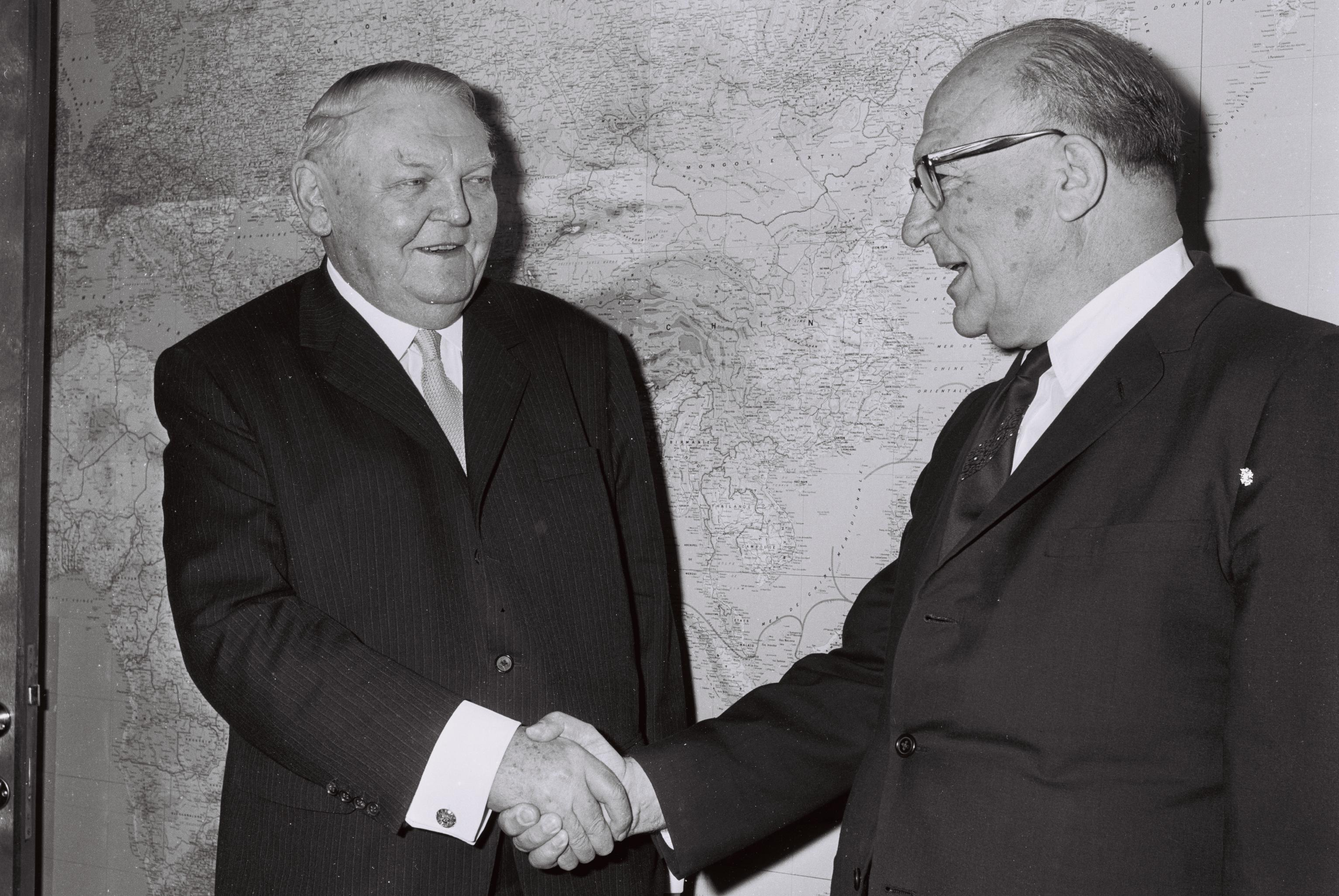
Ludwig Erhard and Israeli Prime Minister Levi Eshkol, 1967

After the resignation of Adenauer in 1963, Erhard was elected chancellor with 279 against 180 votes in the Bundestag on 16 October. In 1965, he was re-elected. From 1966 to 1967, he also headed the Christian Democratic Union as de facto chairman, despite the fact that he was never a member of that party (which made his election to the chairmanship irregular and void de jure), as he never formally filed a membership application despite pressure from Chancellor Adenauer. The reasons for Erhard's reluctance are unknown, but it is probable that they stemmed from Erhard's general scepticism about party politics. However, Erhard was regarded and treated as a long-time CDU member and as the party chairman by almost everyone in Germany at the time, including the vast majority of the CDU itself. The fact that he was not a member was known only to a very small circle of party leaders, and it did not become known to the public until 2007, when the silence was finally broken by Erhard's close advisor Horst Wünsche.

Domestically, a number of progressive reforms were carried out during Erhard's time as chancellor. In the field of social security, Housing Benefit was introduced in 1965.

=== Foreign policy and international trips ===
Erhard considered using money to bring about the reunification of Germany, which would have broken a diplomatic stalemate that had existed since the end of the Second World War regarding the status of West and East Germany. Despite Washington's reluctance, Erhard envisaged offering Nikita Khrushchev, the leader in Moscow, massive economic aid in exchange for more political liberty in East Germany and eventually for reunification. Erhard believed that if West Germany were to offer a "loan" worth $25 billion US to the Soviet Union (which Erhard did not expect to be repaid), then the Soviet Union would permit German reunification. Erhard did not have a specific, concrete plan in mind, however, believing that reality, and especially negotiations over such a major proposition, were too complex to be forecasted in advance with any accuracy, and as a result, he prepared to negotiate without any predetermined agenda. The acting American Secretary of State George Wildman Ball described Erhard's plan to essentially buy East Germany from the Soviet Union as "half-baked and unrealistic." Erhard's objective coincided with Khrushchev's rethinking of his relations with West Germany. The Soviet leader secretly encouraged Erhard to present a realistic proposal for a modus vivendi and officially accepted the Chancellor's invitation to visit Bonn. However, Khrushchev fell from power in October 1964, and nothing developed out of Erhard's envisioned idea for the reunification of Germany. Perhaps more importantly, the Soviet Union had received a vast series of loans from the international money markets by late 1964, and no longer felt the need for Erhard's money.

Support for the American role in the Vietnam War proved fatal for Erhard's coalition. Through his endorsement of the American goal of military victory in Vietnam, Erhard sought closer collaboration with Washington and less with Paris. Erhard's policy complicated Allied initiatives toward German unification, a dilemma that the United States placed on the back burner as it focused on Southeast Asia. Erhard failed to understand that American global interests — not Europe's needs — dictated policy in Washington, D.C., and he rejected Adenauer's policy of fostering good relations with both the United States and France in the pursuit of West German national interest. Faced with a dangerous budget deficit in the 1966–1967 recession, Erhard fell from office in part because of concessions that he made during a visit to U.S. President Lyndon B. Johnson.

Erhard's fall suggested that progress on German unification required a broader approach and a more active foreign policy. Chancellor Willy Brandt in the late 1960s abandoned the Hallstein Doctrine of previous chancellors and employed a new Ostpolitik, seeking improved relations with the Soviet Union and Eastern Europe and thereby laying the groundwork for détente and coexistence between East and West. In the 1980s, Chancellor Helmut Kohl, however, reverted to Erhard's approach in collaborating with the Reagan administration in its hard-line anti-Soviet policy.

Under Erhard's government the Federal Republic entered into diplomatic relations with Israel in 1965.

== Resignation and retirement ==
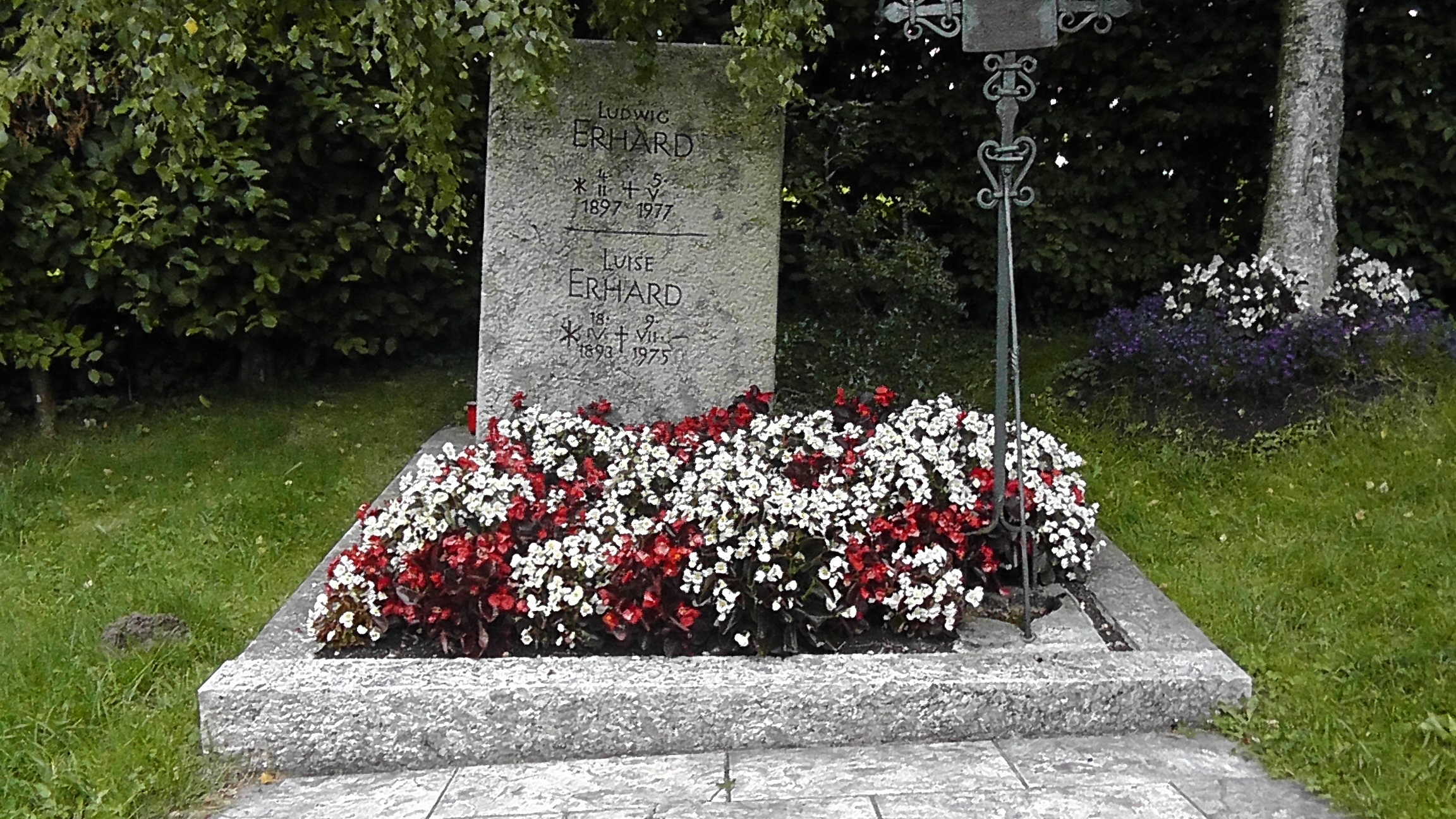
Ludwig Erhard's tomb

On 26 October 1966, Minister Walter Scheel (FDP) resigned, protesting against the budget released the day before. The other ministers who were members of the FDP followed his example — the coalition was broken. On 30 November 1966, Erhard resigned. His successor was Kurt Georg Kiesinger (CDU), who formed a grand coalition with the SPD.

Erhard continued his political work by remaining a member of the West German parliament until his death in Bonn from heart failure on 5 May 1977. He was buried in his place of residence Gmund at the Tegernsee in Upper Bavaria. The Ludwig Erhard-Berufsschule (professional college) in Paderborn, Fürth and Münster are named in his honour.

== Publications by Erhard ==
- Wesen und Inhalt der Werteinheit [Essence and content of the unit of value], doctoral thesis, 1925;
- Kriegsfinanzierung und Schuldenkonsolidierung [War Financing and Debt Consolidation], 1944;
- Deutschlands Rückkehr zum Weltmarkt [Germany's return to the world market], 1953;
- Wohlstand für Alle, Econ Verlag 1957 (Engl. "Prosperity Through Competition"), Thames & Hudson, 1958;
- Deutsche Wirtschaftspolitik, 1962 (Engl. "The Economics of Success"), Thames & Hudson, 1963;
- Grenzen der Demokratie? [Limits of democracy?], Düsseldorf, 1973.

== Bibliography ==
- Berghahn, Volker R. "Ordoliberalism, Ludwig Erhard, and West Germany's "economic basic law". European Review of International Studies 2.3 (2015): 37–47. online
- Goldschmidt, Nils. "Alfred Müller-Armack and Ludwig Erhard: Social Market Liberalism" (No. 04/12. Freiburg discussion papers on constitutional economics, 2004). online
- Gray, William Glenn (2007). "Adenauer, Erhard and the Uses of Prosperity". German Politics and Society. 25 (2): 86–103. doi:10.3167/gps.2007.250206.
- Henderson, David R. "German Economic Miracle." The Concise Encyclopedia of Economics (2008).
- Mierzejewski, Alfred C. Ludwig Erhard: A Biography (Univ of North Carolina Press, 2005).
- Schwarz, Hans-Peter (1995). Konrad Adenauer: A German Politician and Statesman in a Period of War, Revolution, and Reconstruction - Vol. 2. Archived from the original on 19 October 2012 – via Questia.
- Thiemeyer, Guido (2007). "The 'Social Market Economy' and Its Impact on German European Policy in the Adenauer Era, 1949–1963". German Politics and Society. 25 (2): 68–85. doi:10.3167/gps.2007.250205.
- Van Hook, James (2004). "Ludwig Erhard, the CDU, and the Free Market". Rebuilding Germany: The Creation of the Social Market Economy, 1945–1957. New York: Cambridge University Press. pp. 139–188. ISBN 0-521-83362-0.

Political offices
Preceded by ---	Minister for Economics; 1949–1963	Succeeded by Kurt Schmücker
Preceded by Franz Blücher	Vice-Chancellor of Germany; 1957–1963	Succeeded by Erich Mende
Preceded by Konrad Adenauer	Chancellor of West Germany; 1963–1966	Succeeded by Kurt Georg Kiesinger
