= Garrelt Duin =

German politician (b. 1968)

- Duin in 2026

Minister for Economic Affairs and Energy of North Rhine-Westphalia
- In office 21 June 2012 – 30 June 2017
- Minister-President: Hannelore Kraft
- Preceded by: Harry Voigtsberger
- Succeeded by: Andreas Pinkwart

Member of the Bundestag; for Aurich – Emden
- In office 18 October 2005 – 21 June 2012
- Preceded by: Lars Klingbeil
- Succeeded by: Gabriele Groneberg

Member of the European Parliament; for Germany
- In office 2 October 2000 – 17 October 2005
- Preceded by: Günter Lüttge
- Succeeded by: Matthias Groote

Personal details
- Born: 2 April 1968 (age 58) Leer, Lower Saxony, West Germany
- Party: Social Democratic
- Children: 1
- Education: University of Göttingen; Bielefeld University

Garrelt Duin (born 2 April 1968) is a German politician of the Social Democratic Party (SPD).

== Early life and education ==
Duin was born in Leer, Lower Saxony. From 1987 to 1995 he studied law and Protestant theology at Bielefeld and Göttingen. In 1995 he completed his First State law examination, Higher Regional Court, Hamm; in 1998 he finished his Second State law examination, Higher Regional Court, Celle

== Political career ==
- since 1985: Member of the Social Democratic Party of Germany
- since 1993: Member of the executive of the SPD district of Weser-Ems
- 1996–2006: Member of Hinte Municipal Council (2001–2006: Council chairman)
- since 2001: Member of the SPD executive
- since 2002: Chairman of the SPD district of Weser-Ems

=== Member of the European Parliament (2002–2005) ===
In the European Parliament, Duin served on the Committee on Regional Policy, Transport and Tourism (2000–2004) and on the Committee on Industry, Research and Energy (2004–2005). In addition to his committee assignments, he was a member of the parliament's delegation for relations with Switzerland, Iceland and Norway from 2000 until 2004.

=== Member of the German Bundestag (2005–2012) ===
Duin was elected as Member of the German Bundestag in the 2005 federal elections; he got 58 percent of the vote in the Aurich-Emden region in northern Germany. In parliament, he served on the Committee on Economic Affairs and Technology. Within his parliamentary group, he held the position of commissioner for industry policy (2006-2009) and chairman of the working group on economic affairs and technology (2009-2012).

In addition to his committee assignments, Duin served as deputy chairman of the German-British Parliamentary Friendship Group from 2010 until 2012. He was also a member of the German-Austrian Parliamentary Friendship Group, the German-Dutch Parliamentary Friendship Group and the German-Swiss Parliamentary Friendship Group.

Also in 2005, Duin was elected chairman of the SPD in Lower Saxony, succeeding Wolfgang Jüttner. He resigned from this position in 2010 and was replaced by Olaf Lies. Within his party, he belongs to the Seeheim Circle.

Together with Doris Ahnen, Bärbel Diekmann, Barbara Ludwig and Heiko Maas, Duin co-chaired the SPD's 2009 national convention in Dresden.

=== State Minister for Economic Affairs (2012–2017) ===
Duin resigned as Member of the Bundestag on 21 June 2012 and was appointed Minister for Economics, Energy, Industry and Commerce of the state of North Rhine-Westphalia in the government of Minister-President Hannelore Kraft on the same day.

In the negotiations to form a Grand Coalition following the 2013 federal elections, Duin was part of the SPD delegation in the working group on economic policy, led by Ilse Aigner and Hubertus Heil.

During his time in office, Duin was a member of the German-Russian Friendship Group set up by the German Bundesrat and the Russian Federation Council. From 2014 and 2016, he was one of the members of Germany's temporary National Commission on the Disposal of Radioactive Waste.

== Post-political career ==
In February 2018, Duin joined ThyssenKrupp, where he has since been working in the Dortmund-based Industrial Solutions business area.

== Other activities ==
=== Corporate boards ===
- Stadtwerke Köln, Chairman of the supervisory board (since 2018)
- NRW.BANK, Ex-Officio Member of the supervisory board (2012-2017)

=== Non-profit organizations ===
- Friedrich Ebert Foundation (FES), Member
- Forum for Future Energies, Member of the Board of Trustees
- Christoph Metzelder Foundation, Member of the Board of Trustees
- Stiftung Lebendige Stadt, Member of the Foundation Board
- Norddeutscher Rundfunk, Member of the Broadcasting Board
- German United Services Trade Union (ver.di), Member
- Workers' Welfare Association (AWO), Member
- Eurosolar, Member
