= Johann Saathoff =

German politician

Johann Saathoff MdB
- Saathoff in 2021

Member of the Bundestag; for Aurich – Emden
- Incumbent
- Assumed office 22 October 2013
- Preceded by: Gabriele Groneberg

Personal details
- Born: 9 December 1967 (age 58) Emden, West Germany
- Party: Social Democratic
- Children: 5

Johann Saathoff (born 9 December 1967) is a German politician of the Social Democratic Party (SPD) who has been serving as a member of the Bundestag from the state of Lower Saxony since 2013.

In addition to his parliamentary work, Saathoff has been serving as Parliamentary State Secretary in the Federal Ministry for Economic Cooperation and Development in the government of Chancellor Friedrich Merz since 2025.

Saathoff was previously Parliamentary State Secretary at the Federal Ministry of the Interior and Community in the coalition government of Chancellor Olaf Scholz (2021–2025) and the German government's Coordinator for Inter-Societal Cooperation with Russia, Central Asia and the Eastern Partnership Countries at the Federal Foreign Office in the coalition government of Chancellor Angela Merkel (2020–2021).

== Political career ==
Saathoff became a member of the Bundestag in the 2013 German federal election. From 2013 until 2021, he was a member of the Committee for Food and Agriculture and the Committee for Economic Affairs and Energy.

In addition to his committee assignments, Saathoff is part of the German Parliamentary Friendship Group for Relations with the ASEAN States.

In the negotiations to form a so-called traffic light coalition of the SPD, the Green Party and the Free Democratic Party (FDP) following the 2021 federal elections, Saathoff was part of his party's delegation in the working group on economic affairs, co-chaired by Carsten Schneider, Cem Özdemir and Michael Theurer.

== Other activities ==
=== International organizations ===
- Asian Development Bank (ADB), Ex-Officio Member of the Board of Governors (since 2025)
- Inter-American Development Bank (IDB), Ex-Officio Member of the Board of Governors (since 2025)

=== Corporate boards ===
- German Investment Corporation (DEG), Chair of the Supervisory Board (since 2025)

=== Non-profit organizations ===
- Business Forum of the Social Democratic Party of Germany, Member of the Political Advisory Board (since 2018)
- Petersburger Dialog, Member of the Board (since 2020)
- Federal Network Agency for Electricity, Gas, Telecommunications, Post and Railway (BNetzA), Member of the Advisory Board (since 2015)
- Agora Energiewende, Member of the Council
- German United Services Trade Union (ver.di), Member
