= Marja-Liisa Völlers =

German politician

Marja-Liisa Völlers MdB
- Völlers in 2021

Member of the Bundestag
- Incumbent
- Assumed office 23 November 2017
- Preceded by: Carola Reimann
- Constituency: Braunschweig (2017–2021); Nienburg II – Schaumburg (2021–present)

Personal details
- Born: 28 September 1984 (age 42) Bückeburg, West Germany
- Party: Social Democratic
- Education: Bielefeld University

Marja-Liisa Völlers (born 28 September 1984) is a German teacher and politician of the Social Democratic Party (SPD) who has been serving as a member of the Bundestag from the state of Lower Saxony since 2017.

== Political career ==
In the 2017 German federal election, Völlers stood in the SPD constituency of Nienburg II – Schaumburg. She lost to CDU candidate Maik Beermann.

Völlers became a member of the Bundestag in 2017 when she succeeded Carola Reimann who had resigned. She is a member of the Committee on Health and the Committee on Education, Research and Technology Assessment, where she serves as her parliamentary group's rapporteur on digitization and inclusion. Following the 2021 elections, she also joined the Defence Committee.

From 2021 to 2025, Völlers was part of the Parliamentary Oversight Panel (PKGr), which provides parliamentary oversight of Germany's intelligence services BND, BfV and MAD.

In addition to her committee assignments, Völlers has been a member of the German delegation to the NATO Parliamentary Assembly since 2022, where she is part of the Defence and Security Committee.

Within her parliamentary group, Völlers has been serving as one of the two speakers of the Seeheim Circle (alongside Dirk Wiese) since 2022.

In the negotiations to form a Grand Coalition under the leadership of Friedrich Merz's Christian Democrats (CDU together with the Bavarian CSU) and the SPD following the 2025 German elections, Völlers was part of the SPD delegation in the working group on foreign affairs, defense, development cooperation and human rights, led by Johann Wadephul, Florian Hahn and Svenja Schulze.

== Other activities ==
- Federal Academy for Security Policy (BAKS), Member of the Advisory Board (since 2026)
- Education and Science Workers' Union (GEW), Member
