= Luise Erhard =

German economist (1893–1975)

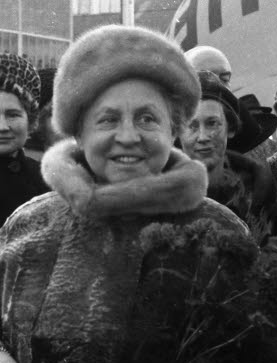
Erhard in 1962

Luise Erhard (née Lotter; formerly Schuster; 18 April 1893 – 9 July 1975) was a German economist and the wife of Ludwig Erhard, former Chancellor of the Federal Republic of Germany.

== Biography ==
Luise Lotter was born in Langenzenn and later moved to Fürth; she lived in the same neighborhood as her future husband, Ludwig Erhard, and was friends with his sister. In 1914, she married Friedrich Schuster, a lawyer, but he was killed a year later while serving in the First World War. She reencountered Erhard while studying business management and accounting in Nuremberg in 1919, and they married in 1923. Luise had a daughter from her first marriage, Eleanore, and had a second daughter, Elizabeth, with Erhard.

Although she was an accomplished economist in her own right, Luise Erhard placed her career on hold to support her husband's political career. Ludwig Erhard served as Chancellor from 1963 until 1966. A 1964 profile in The New York Times noted, "In matters of economics, Luise Erhard, it is said, is one of the German Chancellor's most valued counselors. ... Whatever advice she gives remains private. She prefers homemaking to public life."
