= Cloppenburg – Vechta =

Federal electoral district of Germany

32 Cloppenburg – Vechta
- Electoral district for the Bundestag
- Cloppenburg – Vechta in 2025
- State: Lower Saxony
- Population: 313,500 (2019)
- Electorate: 223,948 (2021)
- Major settlements: Cloppenburg; Vechta; Lohne
- Area: 2,234.5 km^{2}

Current electoral district
- Created: 1949
- Party: CDU
- Member: Silvia Breher
- Elected: 2017, 2021, 2025

Cloppenburg – Vechta is an electoral constituency (German: Wahlkreis) represented in the Bundestag. It elects one member via first-past-the-post voting. Under the current constituency numbering system, it is designated as constituency 32. It is located in northwestern Lower Saxony, comprising the Cloppenburg and Vechta districts.

Cloppenburg – Vechta was created for the inaugural 1949 federal election. Since 2017, it has been represented by Silvia Breher of the Christian Democratic Union (CDU). It is considered one of the safest seats for the CDU, which often receives an absolute majority of the popular vote. This is partly due to the region being very catholic in an otherwise majority-Protestant state.

== Geography ==
Cloppenburg – Vechta is located in northwestern Lower Saxony. As of the 2021 federal election, it comprises the entirety of the Cloppenburg and Vechta districts.

== History ==
Cloppenburg – Vechta was created in 1949, then known as Vechta – Cloppenburg. From 1965 to 1980, it was named Cloppenburg. It acquired its current name in the 1980 election. In the inaugural Bundestag election, it was Lower Saxony constituency 9 in the numbering system. From 1953 through 1961, it was number 31. From 1965 through 1998, it was number 27. From 2002 through 2009, it was number 33. Since 2013, it has been constituency 32.

Originally, the constituency comprised the districts of Cloppenburg and Vechta, as well as the municipalities of Großenkneten, Hatten, Wardenburg, and Wüsting from the Landkreis Oldenburg district. Since the 1965 election, it has comprised only the districts of Cloppenburg and Vechta.

Election	No.	Name	Borders
1949	9	Vechta – Cloppenburg	Cloppenburg district; Vechta district; Landkreis Oldenburg district (only Großenkneten, Hatten, Wardenburg, and Wüsting municipalities)
1953	31	Vechta – Cloppenburg	Cloppenburg district; Vechta district; Landkreis Oldenburg district (only Großenkneten, Hatten, Wardenburg, and Wüsting municipalities)
1957	31	Vechta – Cloppenburg	Cloppenburg district; Vechta district; Landkreis Oldenburg district (only Großenkneten, Hatten, Wardenburg, and Wüsting municipalities)
1961	31	Vechta – Cloppenburg	Cloppenburg district; Vechta district; Landkreis Oldenburg district (only Großenkneten, Hatten, Wardenburg, and Wüsting municipalities)
1965	27	Cloppenburg	Cloppenburg district; Vechta district
1969	27	Cloppenburg	Cloppenburg district; Vechta district
1972	27	Cloppenburg	Cloppenburg district; Vechta district
1976	27	Cloppenburg	Cloppenburg district; Vechta district
1980	27	Cloppenburg – Vechta	Cloppenburg district; Vechta district
1983	27	Cloppenburg – Vechta	Cloppenburg district; Vechta district
1987	27	Cloppenburg – Vechta	Cloppenburg district; Vechta district
1990	27	Cloppenburg – Vechta	Cloppenburg district; Vechta district
1994	27	Cloppenburg – Vechta	Cloppenburg district; Vechta district
1998	27	Cloppenburg – Vechta	Cloppenburg district; Vechta district
2002	33	Cloppenburg – Vechta	Cloppenburg district; Vechta district
2005	33	Cloppenburg – Vechta	Cloppenburg district; Vechta district
2009	33	Cloppenburg – Vechta	Cloppenburg district; Vechta district
2013	32	Cloppenburg – Vechta	Cloppenburg district; Vechta district
2017	32	Cloppenburg – Vechta	Cloppenburg district; Vechta district
2021	32	Cloppenburg – Vechta	Cloppenburg district; Vechta district
2025	32	Cloppenburg – Vechta	Cloppenburg district; Vechta district

== Members ==
The constituency has been held continuously by the Christian Democratic Union (CDU) since its creation. It is a traditional stronghold of the CDU, frequently the party's safest constituency. Its first representative was Georg Kühling, who served a single term from 1949 to 1953. He was succeeded by Kurt Schmücker, who served five terms. Manfred Carstens then represented it for nine terms from 1972 to 2005. Franz-Josef Holzenkamp served until 2017. Silvia Breher won the constituency in 2017, and was re-elected in 2021.

Election	Member	Party	%
1949	Georg Kühling	CDU	45.9
1953	Kurt Schmücker	CDU	77.7
1957	Kurt Schmücker	CDU	77.2
1961	Kurt Schmücker	CDU	81.9
1965	Kurt Schmücker	CDU	79.4
1969	Kurt Schmücker	CDU	73.9
1972	Manfred Carstens	CDU	70.8
1976	Manfred Carstens	CDU	72.7
1980	Manfred Carstens	CDU	71.5
1983	Manfred Carstens	CDU	74.8
1987	Manfred Carstens	CDU	70.0
1990	Manfred Carstens	CDU	71.8
1994	Manfred Carstens	CDU	67.7
1998	Manfred Carstens	CDU	61.9
2002	Manfred Carstens	CDU	62.2
2005	Franz-Josef Holzenkamp	CDU	64.4
2009	Franz-Josef Holzenkamp	CDU	62.3
2013	Franz-Josef Holzenkamp	CDU	66.3
2017	Silvia Breher	CDU	57.7
2021	Silvia Breher	CDU	49.1
2025	Silvia Breher	CDU	45.8

== Election results ==
=== 2025 election ===
Federal election (2025): Cloppenburg – Vechta
Notes:	Blue background denotes the winner of the electorate vote. Pink background denotes a candidate elected from their party list. Yellow background denotes an electorate win by a list member, or other incumbent. A ✓ or ✗ denotes status of any incumbent, win or lose respectively.						
Party	Candidate	Votes	%	±%	Party votes	%	±%
CDU	✓ Silvia Breher	85,241	45.8	▼3.3	73,616	39.5	▲1.1
AfD	Sven Sager	38,366	20.6	▲12.9	38,357	20.6	▲12.8
SPD	Alexander Bartz	32,515	17.5	▼3.2	29,053	15.6	▼9.0
Greens	Marius Meyer	11,280	6.1	▼4.6	13,277	7.1	▼3.9
Left	Uwe Meyer	9,485	5.1	▲2.9	11,518	6.2	▲4.0
FDP	Paul Lanwer	6,135	3.3	▼5.5	8,432	4.5	▼7.6
BSW					6,220	3.3	
FW	Paul Kleine-Klatte	2,954	1.6		1,703	0.9	▲0.4
Tierschutzpartei					1,533	0.8	▼0.1
Volt					851	0.5	▲0.3
PARTEI					638	0.3	▼0.3
dieBasis					366	0.2	▼0.5
Pirates					256	0.1	▼0.2
BD					231	0.1	
Humanists					104	0.1	0.0
MLPD					22	0.0	0.0
Informal votes		1,198			997		
Total valid votes		185,976			186,177		
Turnout		187,174	83.2	▲9.7			
CDU hold	Majority	46,875	25.2	▼3.2			

=== 2021 election ===
Federal election (2021): Cloppenburg – Vechta
Notes:	Blue background denotes the winner of the electorate vote. Pink background denotes a candidate elected from their party list. Yellow background denotes an electorate win by a list member, or other incumbent. A ✓ or ✗ denotes status of any incumbent, win or lose respectively.						
Party	Candidate	Votes	%	±%	Party votes	%	±%
CDU	✓ Silvia Breher	80,134	49.1	▼8.6	62,837	38.5	▼14.6
SPD	Alexander Bartz (Note: Bartz entered the Bundestag on the SPD list after the resignation of Falko Mohrs in November 2022.)	33,825	20.7	▲0.4	40,212	24.6	▲6.9
Greens	Tanja Meyer	17,366	10.6	▲6.3	18,093	11.1	▲6.0
FDP	Carolin Abeln	14,397	8.8	▲3.7	19,747	12.1	▲2.7
AfD	Waldemar Herdt	12,674	7.8	▼0.1	12,772	7.8	▼0.3
Left	Tom Dobrowolski	3,542	2.2	▼1.9	3,549	2.2	▼2.2
Tierschutzpartei					1,579	1.0	▲0.5
PARTEI					1,093	0.7	▲0.1
dieBasis	Melanie Lorenz	1,248	0.8		1,088	0.7	
FW					792	0.5	▲0.2
Pirates					474	0.3	▲0.1
Volt					323	0.2	
Team Todenhöfer					268	0.2	
NPD					104	0.1	▼0.1
Humanists					104	0.1	
du.					92	0.1	
ÖDP					80	0.0	0.0
V-Partei3					67	0.0	0.0
LKR					49	0.0	
DKP					17	0.0	
MLPD					12	0.0	0.0
Informal votes		1,321			1,155		
Total valid votes		163,486			163,652		
Turnout		164,507	73.5	▼0.9			
CDU hold	Majority	46,309	28.4	▼8.9			

=== 2017 election ===
Federal election (2017): Cloppenburg – Vechta
Notes:	Blue background denotes the winner of the electorate vote. Pink background denotes a candidate elected from their party list. Yellow background denotes an electorate win by a list member, or other incumbent. A ✓ or ✗ denotes status of any incumbent, win or lose respectively.						
Party	Candidate	Votes	%	±%	Party votes	%	±%
CDU	Silvia Breher	93,545	57.7	▼8.6	86,301	53.1	▼10.1
SPD	Kristian Kater	32,997	20.4	▼0.9	28,870	17.8	▼2.0
AfD	Holger Teuteberg	12,683	7.8	▲5.7	13,145	8.1	▲5.7
FDP	Caroline Covolo	8,306	5.1	▲3.3	15,298	9.4	▲4.8
Greens	Julius Flinks	7,034	4.3	▲0.6	8,207	5.0	▲0.8
Left	Daniel Welp	6,640	4.1	▲1.6	7,145	4.4	▲1.6
FW	Michael Osterloh	914	0.6	▼0.4	530	0.3	▼0.2
PARTEI					868	0.5	
Tierschutzpartei					803	0.5	0.0
Pirates					381	0.2	▼1.0
NPD					308	0.2	▼0.4
DM					181	0.1	
V-Partei³					134	0.1	
ÖDP					110	0.1	
DiB					105	0.1	
BGE					91	0.1	
MLPD					21	0.0	0.0
DKP					18	0.0	
Informal votes		1,550			1,153		
Total valid votes		162,119			162,516		
Turnout		163,669	74.4	▲3.3			
CDU hold	Majority	60,548	37.3	▼7.7			

=== 2013 election ===
Federal election (2013): Cloppenburg – Vechta
Notes:	Blue background denotes the winner of the electorate vote. Pink background denotes a candidate elected from their party list. Yellow background denotes an electorate win by a list member, or other incumbent. A ✓ or ✗ denotes status of any incumbent, win or lose respectively.						
Party	Candidate	Votes	%	±%	Party votes	%	±%
CDU	✓ Franz-Josef Holzenkamp	101,015	66.3	▲4.0	96,401	63.2	▲8.7
SPD	Gabriele Groneberg (Note: Groneberg entered the Bundestag on the SPD list after the resignation of Sebastian Edathy in February 2014.)	32,422	21.3	▲2.2	30,168	19.8	▲3.3
Greens	Josef Diersen	5,702	3.7	▼0.7	6,488	4.3	▼1.1
Left	Günter Kreßmann	3,821	2.5	▼2.2	4,259	2.8	▼2.3
AfD	Holger Teuteberg	3,238	2.1		3,576	2.3	
FDP	Peter Friedhoff	2,812	1.8	▼6.8	7,073	4.6	▼11.0
Pirates					1,816	1.2	▼0.1
FW	Heinrich Luhr	1,451	1.0		799	0.5	
FAMILIE	André Schäfer	1,022	0.7				
NPD	Ralf Thomas Taube	870	0.6	▼0.3	877	0.6	▼0.2
Tierschutzpartei					681	0.4	▼0.1
PBC					250	0.2	
PRO					104	0.1	
REP					51	0.0	
MLPD					21	0.0	0.0
Informal votes		1,416			1,205		
Total valid votes		152,353			152,564		
Turnout		153,769	71.1	▲1.0			
CDU hold	Majority	68,593	45.0	▲1.8			

=== 2009 election ===
Federal election (2009): Cloppenburg – Vechta
Notes:	Blue background denotes the winner of the electorate vote. Pink background denotes a candidate elected from their party list. Yellow background denotes an electorate win by a list member, or other incumbent. A ✓ or ✗ denotes status of any incumbent, win or lose respectively.						
Party	Candidate	Votes	%	±%	Party votes	%	±%
CDU	✓ Franz-Josef Holzenkamp	91,686	62.3	▼2.2	80,355	54.5	▼2.7
SPD	Gabriele Groneberg	28,053	19.1	▼7.5	24,358	16.5	▼8.8
FDP	Peter Friedhoff	12,700	8.6	▲4.7	23,001	15.6	▲5.4
Left	Markus Schalk	6,927	4.7	▲2.8	7,518	5.1	▲2.8
Greens	Josef Dobelmann	6,575	4.5	▲2.1	7,827	5.3	▲2.0
Pirates					1,953	1.3	
NPD	Cora Meyer	1,286	0.9	▲0.1	1,132	0.8	0.0
Tierschutzpartei					766	0.5	▲0.1
RRP					372	0.3	
ÖDP					108	0.1	
DVU					85	0.0	
MLPD					35	0.0	
Informal votes		1,708			1,425		
Total valid votes		147,227			147,510		
Turnout		148,935	70.1	▼7.6			
CDU hold	Majority	63,633	43.2	▲5.3			

=== 2005 election ===
Federal election (2005):Cloppenburg - Vechta
Notes:	Blue background denotes the winner of the electorate vote. Pink background denotes a candidate elected from their party list. Yellow background denotes an electorate win by a list member, or other incumbent. A ✓ or ✗ denotes status of any incumbent, win or lose respectively.						
Party	Candidate	Votes	%	±%	Party votes	%	±%
CDU	Franz-Josef Holzenkamp	101,777	64.4	▲2.2	90,513	57.2	▼2.1
SPD	Gabriele Groneberg	41,988	26.6	▼1.6	40,084	25.3	▼2.8
FDP	Peter Primus	6,177	3.9	▼2.1	16,071	10.2	▲2.8
Greens	Anne Rameil	3,723	2.4	▼0.5	5,227	3.3	▼0.1
Left	Silvia Sedelmayr	3,018	1.9	▲1.1	3,602	2.3	▲1.8
NPD	Michael Meyer	1,248	0.8		1.219	0.8	▲0.6
Tierschutzpartei					613	0.4	▲0.1
PBC					507	0.3	▲0.1
GRAUEN					304	0.2	▲0.1
Pro German Center – Pro D-Mark Initiative					104	0.1	
BüSo					50	0.0	0.0
MLPD					35	0.0	
Informal votes		2,376			1,978		
Total valid votes		157,931			158,329		
Turnout		160,307	77.7	▼2.7			
CDU hold	Majority	59,789	37.8				
