= Sebastian Edathy =

German politician

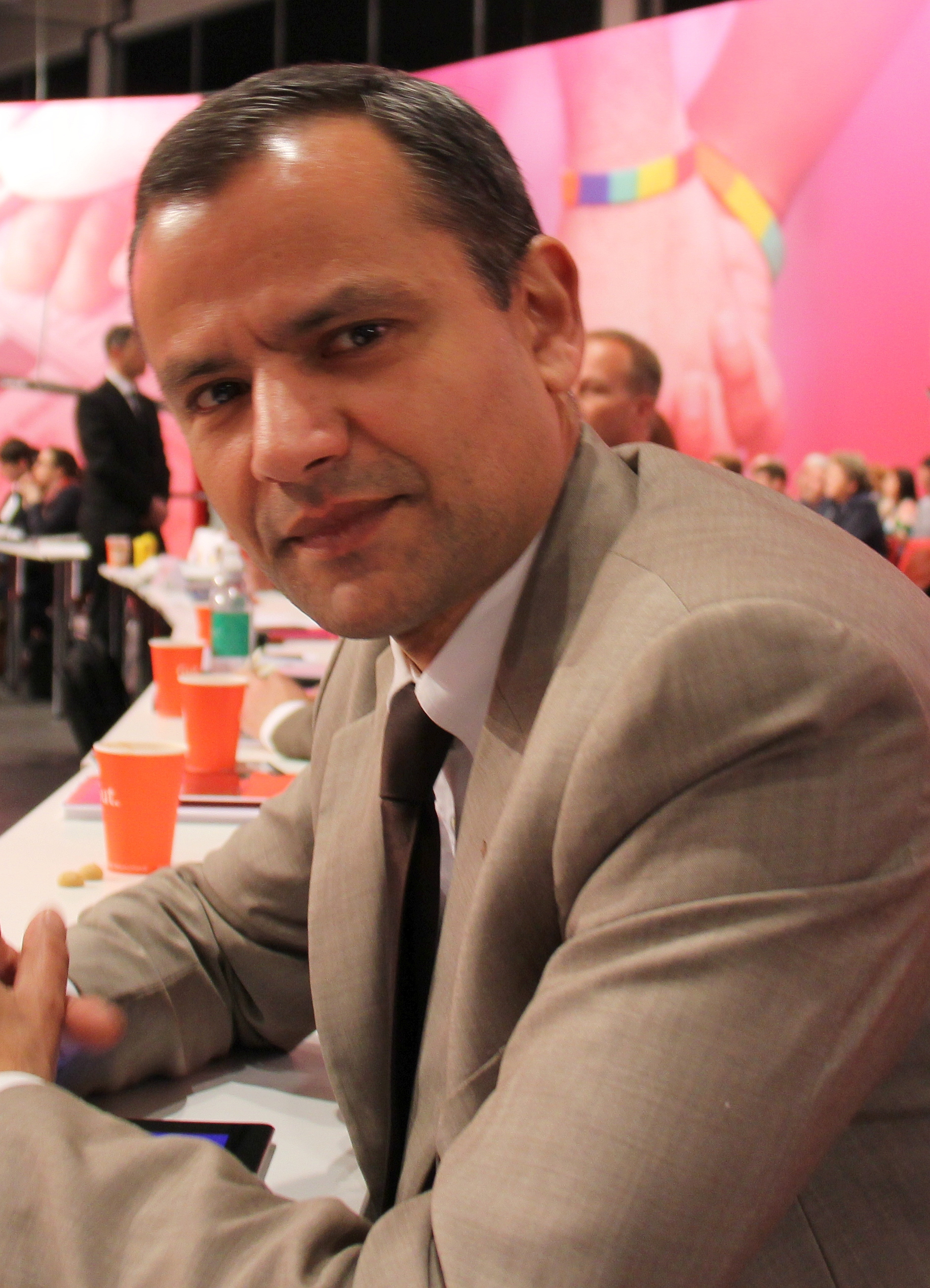
- Edathy in 2013

Chair of the Internal Affairs Committee
- In office 18 October 2005 – 17 October 2009
- President: Norbert Lammert
- Preceded by: Cornelie Sonntag-Wolgast
- Succeeded by: Wolfgang Bosbach

Member of the Bundestag
- In office 26 October 1998 – 10 February 2014
- Preceded by: Ernst Kasting
- Succeeded by: Gabriele Groneberg
- Constituency: Nienburg – Schaumburg (1998–2002); Nienburg II – Schaumburg (2002–2017)

Personal details
- Born: Sebastian Edathiparambil; 5 September 1969 (age 57) Hanover, West Germany
- Party: Social Democratic
- Education: University of Hannover
- Profession: Sociologist
- Website: www.edathy.de

Sebastian Edathy (German pronunciation: [eˈdaːti]; born Sebastian Edathiparambil; 5 September 1969) is a German former politician. He was a prominent member of the Social Democratic Party (SPD) and became the chairman of a key committee in January 2012 at the Parliament, which was investigating failures of police and intelligence units in the serial murders of nine immigrants by the far-right German terrorist group National Socialist Underground (NSU) from 2000 to 2007. The NSU committee questioned various officials from Germany's Federal Criminal Police Office during 2012 and 2013. His alleged possession of child porn material sparked the Edathy-Affäre.

== Life and career ==
Edathy was born in Hanover, the son of a Malayali immigrant from Kerala, India, and a German mother. He has studied sociology and published books on immigration and right-wing extremism. He was an SPD member of the Bundestag from 1998, representing Nienburg II – Schaumburg. He was a member of former Chancellor Gerhard Schröder's red–green coalition, and a member of Chancellor Angela Merkel's grand coalition. He was the chairman of the Bundestag Committee on Interior Affairs and was chairman of the German–Indian group of members of the Bundestag. He was re-elected in the general election in September 2009 and again in the general election in September 2013.

== Resignation ==
Edathy announced his resignation from parliament "for health reasons" on 7 February 2014. Just two days after his resignation went public, his home and offices were searched by authorities; media outlets asserted that the searches were made on allegations of possession of child pornography. On 14 February 2014, Hans-Peter Friedrich resigned from the ruling CDU–SPD grand coalition government reacting to imminent legal investigations into incidents during his tenure as Federal Minister of the Interior. Friedrich was accused of betraying state secrets about legal investigations to SPD party heads during the coalition negotiations after the federal elections in 2013 about information showing Edathy's link to a globally-operating child pornography syndicate and plans to take up an investigation against Edathy on suspicion of possessing such material. "The SPD's top leaders, who received the intelligence information from Friedrich, said they [did] not [...] tip off [...] Edathy and [...] kept the information secret." They are Economy Minister Sigmar Gabriel, who is also Merkel's deputy, Foreign Minister Frank-Walter Steinmeier, and the party's parliamentary leader, Thomas Oppermann.

Edathy admitted to having purchased some material from a Canadian firm but denied the allegations of possessing child pornography, insisting the material he purchased was "unambiguously legal."

The criminal investigation into child pornography turned into a crisis for Germany's new grand coalition government and the Federal Criminal Police Office (Bundeskriminalamt, BKA) came under growing pressure for its role in the scandal after reports revealed serious failures in the investigation of child porn claims against Edathy. The BKA received documents from Canadian authorities in October 2011 that involved possible child porn claims about Edathy, but it only conveyed documents to the state authorities in Lower Saxony two years after, in late 2013 for further investigation.

Politicians from the socialist The Left, Green and the classical liberal Free Democrat parties all voiced disbelief that the BKA did not know. Die Linke chief Bernd Riexinger: "It is absolutely not plausible that information about Edathy did not reach the BKA." FDP vice chairman Wolfgang Kubicki told that in the ranks of the BKA "either idiots were at work or they were trying to avoid a scandal." Even the Christian Social Union – the Bavarian sister party of Chancellor Merkel's dominant CDU – expressed confusion, interior spokesman Stephan Mayer: "It is inexplicable that the BKA did not notice that Edathy's name was on the list of child porn buyers."

In March 2015 Edathy admitted to having downloaded, with his official laptop, videos and pictures of naked minors from the Internet. He has acknowledged he made a mistake. Following Edathy's admission, the Verden District Court in the German state of Lower Saxony handed the former Social Democrats (SPD) deputy a fine of 5,000 euros ($5,600), bringing the trial to an end. Technically the pictures were not illegal and Edathy has denied possessing child pornography. As the prosecution was halted he has not been convicted. The ex-MP will not have a criminal record.

== Personal life ==
Edathy is gay.

== See also ==
- 2013 International child porn investigation
