= Georg Peters =

German physician

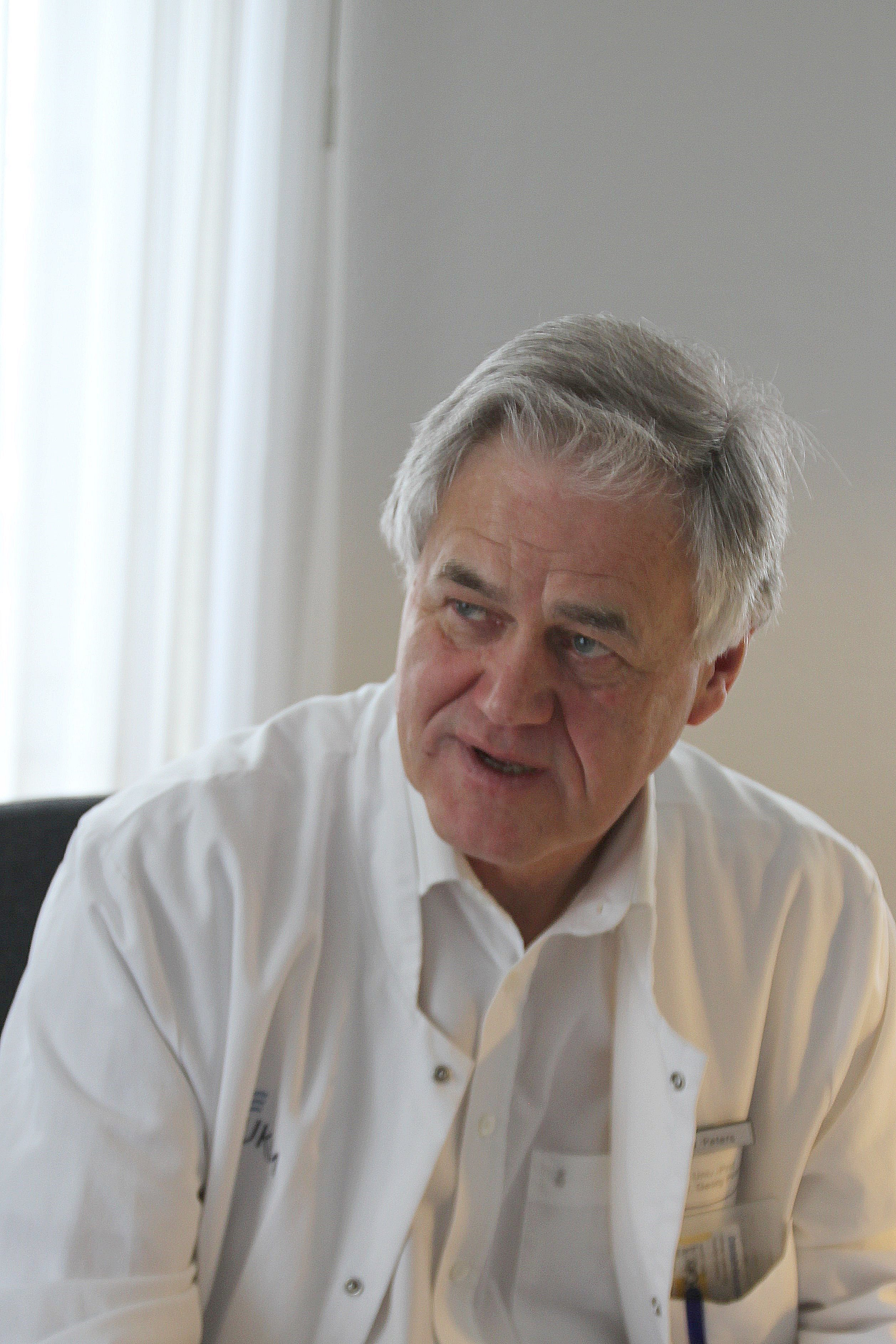
Georg Peters, 2014

Georg Peters (March 11, 1951 in Asperden – August 8, 2018 Karwendel) was a German physician, microbiologist and university professor. From 1992 until his fatal mountain accident he headed the Institute of Medical Microbiology at the University of Münster. He was an internationally recognised expert in the field of staphylococci and the infectious diseases caused by them, to which he had devoted himself since the beginning of his scientific career.

== Professional career ==
Georg Peters came from a simple farming background. He studied human medicine at the University of Cologne, where he passed the state examination in 1975 and received his doctorate in 1976. After professional stations at the Children's Hospital Norderney and at the Clinic for Internal Medicine II at the University Hospital Cologne, he worked for several years at the Institute for Medical Microbiology and Hygiene at the University of Cologne, first as a research assistant, later as a senior physician.
In 1982, he was recognised as a specialist in microbiology and infection epidemiology in Cologne and went to the University of Minnesota in Minneapolis for one year on a scholarship by the German Research Foundation (DFG). In 1985 he habilitated and was awarded a C2 professorship at the University of Cologne in 1986.
In 1992 he was appointed full professor at the University of Münster and has since headed the Institute for Medical Microbiology there.

The focus of his scientific research was staphylococci and the diseases they cause. His findings on the pathogenesis of foreign body-associated infections by coagulase-negative staphylococci and their ability to form biofilms are considered groundbreaking. His first publication on this topic dates back to 1982, and he consistently championed the diagnosis, prophylaxis and therapy of infections caused by multi-resistant pathogens, such as in particular the methicillin-resistant Staphylococcus aureus strains, the so-called MRSA. His reputation in this field was reflected, among other things, in his election as vice-president (1991) and president (1993) of the "Gordon Research Conference on Staphylococcal Diseases".

Peters was a member of the Cells in Motion (CiM) Cluster of Excellence at the University of Münster as Principal Investigator since 2012.

He was able to inspire young academics to research pathogens and was awarded the teaching prize by the students of the Medical Faculty of the University of Münster several times.

Peters fought with dedication for the expansion of medical microbiology and infectious medicine in Germany.

In memory of Peters, the Paul Ehrlich Society for Chemotherapy has established a "Georg Peters Lecture" at its annual Bad Honnef Symposium on Infectious Diseases. The German Society for Hygiene and Microbiology (DGHM) held a "Georg Peters Memorial Lecture" at its 71st Annual Meeting in Göttingen, and the European Society of Clinical Microbiology and Infectious Diseases (ESCMID) held a "Georg Peters Memorial Session" on coagulase-negative staphylococci at the 29th European Congress of Clinical Microbiology & Infectious Diseases (ECCMID) in Amsterdam.

== Activity in committees/specialist societies ==
- Deutsche Gesellschaft für Hygiene und Mikrobiologie, president from 1998 to 2000
- German Paul Ehrlich Society for Chemotherapy, president from 2002 to 2004
- Robert-Koch-Institut, since 2003 on the scientific advisory board, from 2009 its chairman.
- Joint scientific advisory board of the Federal Ministry of Health (Germany), vice-chairman
- Gordon Research Conference on Staphylococcal Diseases, elected vice-president and president
- Member of the Working Group on MRSA of the International Society of Antimicrobial Chemotherapy (ISAC).
- German Research Foundation (DFG) Collaborative Research Centres "Mechanisms of inflammation" and "Breaking barriers", Spokesperson
- German Research Foundation Review Board "Microbiology, Virology, Immunology"
- Expert in the German German Council of Science and Humanities
- Senate of the German Research Foundation
- Board of trustees of the German Sepsis Foundation
- Incentive program Innovative Medical Research (IMF) Münster, chairman from 1996 to 2002
- Interdisciplinary Centre for Clinical Research (IZKF) Münster, spokesperson from 2006 to 2012.
- Senate of the University of Münster, its chairman from 2014 to 2018.
- Board of Directors of the Dr Mildred Scheel Foundation for Cancer Research, since 2015
- Federation of bioscientific and biomedical societies, Vice-President (today: Federation of Biology, Biosciences and Biomedicine in Germany)
- Advisory board of the medical journal Deutsches Ärzteblatt

== Publications (selection) ==
- Georg Peters, R. Locci, G. Pulverer: Adherence and growth of coagulase-negative staphylococci on surfaces of intravenous catheters. In: J Inf Dis. 146, 1982, S. 479–482. doi:10.1093/infdis/146.4.479
- E. D. Gray, Georg Peters, M. Verstegen, W. E. Regelmann: Effect of extracellular slime substance from Staphylococcus epidermidis on the human cellular immune response. In: Lancet. 1(8373), 1984, S. 365–367. doi:10.1016/S0140-6736(84)90413-6.
- Georg Peters, C. von Eiff, M. Herrmann: The changing pattern of coagulase-negative staphylococci as infectious pathogens. In: Current Opinion in Infectious Diseases. 8 (Suppl 1), 1995, S. S12–S19. doi:10.1097/00001432-199503001-00004.
- C. Breitkopf, D. Hammel, H. H. Scheld, Georg Peters, K. Becker: Impact of a molecular approach to improve the microbiological diagnosis of infective heart valve endocarditis. In: Circulation. 111(11), 2005, S. 1415–1421. doi:10.1161/01.CIR.0000158481.07569.8D
- R. A. Proctor, C. von Eiff, B. C. Kahl, K. Becker, P. McNamara, M. Herrmann, Georg Peters: Small colony variants: a pathogenic form of bacteria that facilitates persistent and recurrent infections. In: Nat Rev Microbiol. 4(4), 2006, S. 295–305. doi:10.1038/nrmicro1384
- K. Becker, C. Heilmann, Georg Peters: Coagulase-negative staphylococci. In: Clin Microbiol Rev. 27(4), 2014, S. 870–926. doi:10.1128/CMR.00109-13.
- R. A. Proctor, A. Kriegeskorte, B. C. Kahl, K. Becker, B. Löffler, Georg Peters: Staphylococcus aureus small colony variants (SCVs): A road map for the metabolic pathways involved in persistent infections. In: Front Cell Infect Microbiol. 4, 2014, S. 99. doi:10.3389/fcimb.2014.00099

Peters is listed as an author or co-author of more than 250 peer-reviewed publications in the Medline database PubMed from 1987 to 2021.
