= Nienburg II – Schaumburg =

Federal electoral district of Germany

40 Nienburg II – Schaumburg
- Electoral district for the Bundestag
- Nienburg II – Schaumburg in 2025
- State: Lower Saxony
- Population: 248,400 (2019)
- Electorate: 193,863 (2021)
- Major settlements: Nienburg; Rinteln; Stadthagen
- Area: 1,576.6 km^{2}

Current electoral district
- Created: 1949
- Party: SPD
- Member: Marja-Liisa Völlers
- Elected: 2021, 2025

Nienburg II – Schaumburg is an electoral constituency (German: Wahlkreis) represented in the Bundestag. It elects one member via first-past-the-post voting. Under the current constituency numbering system, it is designated as constituency 40. It is located in central Lower Saxony, comprising the district of Schaumburg and most of the district of Nienburg.

Nienburg II – Schaumburg was created for the inaugural 1949 federal election. Since 2017, it has been represented by Marja-Liisa Völlers of the Social Democratic Party (SPD).

== Geography ==
Nienburg II – Schaumburg is located in central Lower Saxony. As of the 2021 federal election, it comprises the district of Schaumburg and the district of Nienburg with the exception of the Samtgemeinden of Uchte and Grafschaft Hoya.

== History ==
Nienburg II – Schaumburg was created in 1949, then known as Nienburg – Schaumburg-Lippe. In the 1965 through 1976 elections, it was simply named Schaumburg. In the 1980 through 1998 elections, it was named Nienburg – Schaumburg. It acquired its current name in the 2002 election. In the inaugural Bundestag election, it was Lower Saxony constituency 22 in the numbering system. From 1953 through 1961, it was number 44. From 1965 through 1976, it was number 35. From 1980 through 1998, it was number 34. In the 2002 and 2005 elections, it was number 40. In the 2009 election, it was number 41. Since the 2013 election, it has been number 40.

Originally, the constituency comprised the districts of Schaumburg-Lippe and Nienburg excluding the Samtgemeinde of Uchte. In the 1965 through 1976 elections, it comprised the entirety of the districts of Schaumburg-Lippe, Grafschaft Schaumburg, and Neustadt am Rübenberge. In the 1980 through 1998 elections, it comprised the entirety of the Schaumburg and Nienburg districts. In the 2002 election, the Samtgemeinden of Uchte and Grafschaft Hoya were transferred away from the constituency.

Election	No.	Name	Borders
1949	22	Nienburg – Schaumburg-Lippe	Schaumburg-Lippe district; Nienburg district (excluding Uchte Samtgemeinde)
1953	44	Nienburg – Schaumburg-Lippe	Schaumburg-Lippe district; Nienburg district (excluding Uchte Samtgemeinde)
1957	44	Nienburg – Schaumburg-Lippe	Schaumburg-Lippe district; Nienburg district (excluding Uchte Samtgemeinde)
1961	44	Nienburg – Schaumburg-Lippe	Schaumburg-Lippe district; Nienburg district (excluding Uchte Samtgemeinde)
1965	35	Schaumburg	Schaumburg-Lippe district; Grafschaft Schaumburg district; Neustadt am Rübenberge district
1969	35	Schaumburg	Schaumburg-Lippe district; Grafschaft Schaumburg district; Neustadt am Rübenberge district
1972	35	Schaumburg	Schaumburg-Lippe district; Grafschaft Schaumburg district; Neustadt am Rübenberge district
1976	35	Schaumburg	Schaumburg-Lippe district; Grafschaft Schaumburg district; Neustadt am Rübenberge district
1980	34	Nienburg – Schaumburg	Schaumburg district; Nienburg district
1983	34	Nienburg – Schaumburg	Schaumburg district; Nienburg district
1987	34	Nienburg – Schaumburg	Schaumburg district; Nienburg district
1990	34	Nienburg – Schaumburg	Schaumburg district; Nienburg district
1994	34	Nienburg – Schaumburg	Schaumburg district; Nienburg district
1998	34	Nienburg – Schaumburg	Schaumburg district; Nienburg district
2002	40	Nienburg II – Schaumburg	Schaumburg district; Nienburg district (excluding Uchte and Grafschaft Hoya Samegemeinden)
2005	40	Nienburg II – Schaumburg	Schaumburg district; Nienburg district (excluding Uchte and Grafschaft Hoya Samegemeinden)
2009	41	Nienburg II – Schaumburg	Schaumburg district; Nienburg district (excluding Uchte and Grafschaft Hoya Samegemeinden)
2013	40	Nienburg II – Schaumburg	Schaumburg district; Nienburg district (excluding Uchte and Grafschaft Hoya Samegemeinden)
2017	40	Nienburg II – Schaumburg	Schaumburg district; Nienburg district (excluding Uchte and Grafschaft Hoya Samegemeinden)
2021	40	Nienburg II – Schaumburg	Schaumburg district; Nienburg district (excluding Uchte and Grafschaft Hoya Samegemeinden)
2025	40	Nienburg II – Schaumburg	Schaumburg district; Nienburg district (excluding Uchte and Grafschaft Hoya Samegemeinden)

== Members ==
The constituency has been held by the Social Democratic Party (SPD) during all but three Bundestag terms since 1949. Its first representative was Otto Heinrich Greve of the SPD, who served from 1949 to 1961. Future President of Germany Gustav Heinemann served one term as representative from 1961 to 1965. Friedrich Blume then served from 1965 to 1969. Friedel Schirmer was representative from 1969 to 1983, when the Christian Democratic Union (CDU) candidate Helmut Rode won the constituency. Ernst Kastning of the SPD won in 1987, but Rode won again in 1990. Kastning returned in 1994 and served a single term. Sebastian Edathy was elected in 1998, and served until his resignation in 2014. In 2017, the CDU won the constituency for only the third time in its history; Maik Beermann served as representative. Marja-Liisa Völlers regained it for the SPD in 2021.

Election	Member	Party	%
1949	Otto Heinrich Greve	SPD	35.7
1953	Otto Heinrich Greve	SPD	35.6
1957	Otto Heinrich Greve	SPD	39.2
1961	Gustav Heinemann	SPD	44.3
1965	Friedrich Blume	SPD	47.4
1969	Friedel Schirmer	SPD	52.4
1972	Friedel Schirmer	SPD	56.8
1976	Friedel Schirmer	SPD	52.0
1980	Friedel Schirmer	SPD	52.3
1983	Helmut Rode	CDU	48.2
1987	Ernst Kastning	SPD	45.9
1990	Helmut Rode	CDU	45.5
1994	Ernst Kastning	SPD	47.1
1998	Sebastian Edathy	SPD	51.8
2002	Sebastian Edathy	SPD	53.9
2005	Sebastian Edathy	SPD	51.6
2009	Sebastian Edathy	SPD	41.4
2013	Sebastian Edathy	SPD	44.6
2017	Maik Beermann	CDU	40.6
2021	Marja-Liisa Völlers	SPD	35.3
2025	Marja-Liisa Völlers	SPD	31.7

== Election results ==
=== 2025 election ===
Federal election (2025): Nienburg II – Schaumburg
Notes:	Blue background denotes the winner of the electorate vote. Pink background denotes a candidate elected from their party list. Yellow background denotes an electorate win by a list member, or other incumbent. A ✓ or ✗ denotes status of any incumbent, win or lose respectively.						
Party	Candidate	Votes	%	±%	Party votes	%	±%
SPD	✓ Marja-Liisa Völlers	49,658	31.7	▼3.6	38,093	24.3	▼10.6
CDU	Matthias Wehrung	44,786	28.6	▼2.3	42,907	27.4	▲3.4
AfD	Rocco Kever	31,459	20.1	▲11.9	32,249	20.6	▲11.8
Greens	Sven Frings-Michalek	11,724	7.5	▼5.3	15,550	9.9	▼4.2
Left	Anne-Mieke Bremer	8,669	5.5	▲3.4	10,235	6.5	▲3.8
FDP	Fabian Horn	4,383	2.8	▼3.4	5,936	3.8	▼6.2
BSW					5,728	3.7	
Tierschutzpartei					1,985	1.3	▼0.2
FW	Rolf Sieling	2,634	1.7	▲0.5	1,584	1.0	▲0.1
PARTEI	Marcel Rudolf	1,656	1.1		763	0.5	▼0.4
Volt	Maximilian Ochs	1,015	0.6		723	0.5	▲0.3
Independent	Niklas Nietfeld	423	0.3				
dieBasis					318	0.2	▼0.8
Pirates					247	0.2	▼0.2
BD					205	0.1	
Humanists					131	0.1	0.0
MLPD					30	0.0	0.0
Informal votes		1,100			823		
Total valid votes		156,407			156,884		
Turnout		157,507	82.5	▲8.7			
SPD hold	Majority	4,872	3.1	▼1.3			

=== 2021 election ===
Federal election (2021): Nienburg II – Schaumburg
Notes:	Blue background denotes the winner of the electorate vote. Pink background denotes a candidate elected from their party list. Yellow background denotes an electorate win by a list member, or other incumbent. A ✓ or ✗ denotes status of any incumbent, win or lose respectively.						
Party	Candidate	Votes	%	±%	Party votes	%	±%
SPD	Marja-Liisa Völlers	50,017	35.3	▲2.6	49,553	34.9	▲5.2
CDU	✗ Maik Beermann	43,817	30.9	▼9.7	33,968	24.0	▼10.3
Greens	Katja Keul	18,094	12.8	▲5.1	19,968	14.1	▲5.0
AfD	Thorsten Althaus	11,695	8.3	▼0.9	12,434	8.8	▼1.5
FDP	Anton van der Born	8,804	6.2	▲1.7	14,213	10.0	▲1.5
Left	Lennart Dahms	3,070	2.2	▼2.3	3,842	2.7	▼3.0
Tierschutzpartei	Gabriele Tautz	2,800	2.0		2,078	1.5	▲0.5
FW	Sabine Hartung	1,746	1.2		1,335	0.9	▲0.6
dieBasis	Rainer Schippers	1,382	1.0		1,457	1.0	
PARTEI					1,211	0.9	▲0.1
Pirates					552	0.4	0.0
Team Todenhöfer					352	0.2	
Volt					250	0.2	
Independent	Heinz Josef Weich	222	0.2				
NPD					154	0.1	▼0.2
Humanists					108	0.1	
V-Partei3					97	0.1	▼0.1
du.					79	0.1	
ÖDP					72	0.1	0.0
LKR					32	0.0	
DKP					21	0.0	0.0
MLPD					16	0.0	0.0
Informal votes		1,248			1,103		
Total valid votes		141,647			141,792		
Turnout		142,895	73.7	▼1.6			
SPD gain from CDU	Majority	6,200	4.4				

=== 2017 election ===
Federal election (2017): Nienburg II – Schaumburg
Notes:	Blue background denotes the winner of the electorate vote. Pink background denotes a candidate elected from their party list. Yellow background denotes an electorate win by a list member, or other incumbent. A ✓ or ✗ denotes status of any incumbent, win or lose respectively.						
Party	Candidate	Votes	%	±%	Party votes	%	±%
CDU	Maik Beermann	59,128	40.6	▼0.9	49,896	34.3	▼5.8
SPD	Marja-Liisa Völlers	47,615	32.7	▼11.9	43,307	29.7	▼6.6
AfD	Pascal Stüber	13,292	9.1		14,945	10.3	▲6.3
Greens	Katja Keul	11,206	7.7	▲1.9	11,831	8.1	0.0
FDP	Daniel Winter	6,539	4.5	▲3.1	12,430	8.5	▲5.0
Left	Torben Franz	6,530	4.5	▲1.2	8,289	5.7	▲1.4
Tierschutzpartei					1,467	1.0	▲0.2
Pirates	Martina Broschei	1,167	0.8	▼1.1	545	0.4	▼1.1
PARTEI					1,066	0.7	
FW					469	0.3	0.0
NPD					406	0.3	▼0.6
DM					278	0.2	
BGE					191	0.1	
V-Partei³					177	0.1	
DiB					171	0.1	
ÖDP					119	0.1	
MLPD					46	0.0	0.0
DKP					21	0.0	
Informal votes		1,196			1,019		
Total valid votes		145,477			145,654		
Turnout		146,673	75.3	▲2.9			
CDU gain from SPD	Majority	11,513	7.9				

=== 2013 election ===
Federal election (2013): Nienburg II – Schaumburg
Notes:	Blue background denotes the winner of the electorate vote. Pink background denotes a candidate elected from their party list. Yellow background denotes an electorate win by a list member, or other incumbent. A ✓ or ✗ denotes status of any incumbent, win or lose respectively.						
Party	Candidate	Votes	%	±%	Party votes	%	±%
SPD	✓ Sebastian Edathy	62,641	44.6	▲3.3	51,043	36.3	▲3.3
CDU	Maik Beermann	58,349	41.6	▲4.4	56,279	40.0	▲7.8
Greens	Katja Keul	8,173	5.8	▼1.4	11,370	8.1	▼1.6
Left	Torben Franz	4,649	3.3	▼2.9	6,006	4.3	▼3.4
AfD					5,514	3.9	
Pirates	Bernd Riensch	2,693	1.9		2,108	1.5	▼0.2
FDP	Ralf Kirstan	1,950	1.4	▼4.8	4,993	3.9	▼8.9
NPD	Brigitte Kallweit	1,854	1.3	▼0.1	1,216	0.9	▼0.4
Tierschutzpartei					1,129	0.8	0.0
FW					436	0.3	
PBC					211	0.2	
PRO					159	0.1	
REP					112	0.1	
MLPD					41	0.0	0.0
Informal votes		1,464			1,156		
Total valid votes		140,309			140,617		
Turnout		141,773	72.4	▲0.1			
SPD hold	Majority	4,292	3.0	▼1.2			

=== 2009 election ===
Federal election (2009): Nienburg II – Schaumburg
Notes:	Blue background denotes the winner of the electorate vote. Pink background denotes a candidate elected from their party list. Yellow background denotes an electorate win by a list member, or other incumbent. A ✓ or ✗ denotes status of any incumbent, win or lose respectively.						
Party	Candidate	Votes	%	±%	Party votes	%	±%
SPD	✓ Sebastian Edathy	58,639	41.4	▼10.2	46,797	33.0	▼14.0
CDU	Christopher Wuttke	52,714	37.2	▲0.4	45,750	32.2	▼0.3
Greens	Katja Keul	10,217	7.2	▲3.9	13,815	9.7	▲3.7
Left	Dietmar Mattiat	8,797	6.2	▲3.2	10,847	7.6	▲4.0
FDP	Heiner Schülke	8,712	6.1	▲2.7	17,698	12.5	▲4.4
Pirates					2,454	1.7	
NPD	Frank Blome	2,036	1.4	▼0.1	1,858	1.3	▼0.2
RRP					1,352	1.0	
Tierschutzpartei					1,079	0.8	▲0.2
Independent	Lino Coscia	567	0.4				
ÖDP					183	0.1	
DVU					147	0.1	
MLPD					42	0.0	0.0
Informal votes		1,706			1,376		
Total valid votes		141,692			142,022		
Turnout		143,398	72.3	▼6.8			
SPD hold	Majority	5,935	4.2	▼10.6			

=== 2005 election ===
Federal election (2005):Nienburg II – Schaumburg
Notes:	Blue background denotes the winner of the electorate vote. Pink background denotes a candidate elected from their party list. Yellow background denotes an electorate win by a list member, or other incumbent. A ✓ or ✗ denotes status of any incumbent, win or lose respectively.						
Party	Candidate	Votes	%	±%	Party votes	%	±%
SPD	✓ Sebastian Edathy	80,280	51.6	▼2.3	73,126	47.0	▼4.4
CDU	Hermann Bartels	57,237	36.8	▼0.4	50,643	32.5	▼1.1
FDP	Lothar Biege	5,374	3.5	▼0.8	12,548	8.1	▲2.0
Greens	Friedrich Naehring	5,190	3.3	▼1.3	9,457	6.1	▲0.4
Left	Ulrich Witteler	4,637	3.0		5,618	3.6	▲2.7
NPD	Marcus Winter	2,363	1.5		2,369	1.5	▲1.3
Tierschutzpartei					808	0.5	▲0.1
GRAUEN					443	0.3	▲0.2
Independent	Henning Wessel	435	0.3				
PBC					432	0.3	0.0
Pro German Center – Pro D-Mark Initiative					140	0.1	
BüSo					75	0.0	0.0
MLPD					45	0.0	
Informal votes		2,024			1,836		
Total valid votes		155,516			155,704		
Turnout		157,540	79.1	▼1.5			
SPD hold	Majority	23,043	14.8				
