= Kurt Schmücker =

German politician

- Schmücker in 1969

Minister for the Treasury
- In office 1 December 1966 – 21 October 1969
- Chancellor: Kurt Georg Kiesinger
- Preceded by: Werner Dollinger
- Succeeded by: Office abolished

Minister of Finance
- In office 8 November 1966 – 1 December 1966
- Chancellor: Ludwig Erhard
- Preceded by: Rolf Dahlgrün
- Succeeded by: Franz Josef Strauss

Minister of Economics
- In office 17 October 1963 – 30 November 1966
- Chancellor: Ludwig Erhard
- Preceded by: Ludwig Erhard
- Succeeded by: Karl Schiller

Member of the Bundestag; from Lower Saxony
- In office 7 September 1949 – 13 December 1972
- Preceded by: Constituency established
- Succeeded by: Manfred Carstens
- Constituency: State list (1949–1953); Vechta – Cloppenburg (1953–1965); Cloppenburg (1965–1972)

Personal details
- Born: Karl Bernhard Kurt Schmücker; 10 November 1919 Löningen, Germany
- Died: 6 January 1996 (aged 76) Löningen, Germany
- Party: Christian Democratic Union
- Profession: Printer

Kurt Schmücker (10 November 1919 – 6 January 1996) was a German politician, member of Christian Democratic Union (CDU).

== Biography ==
Schmücker was born on 10 November 1919 in Löningen, in the Free State of Oldenburg. In 1938, he ended a book printing course and started working in local newspapers. From 1940 to 1945, he served in the German infantry during World War II.

In 1937, Schmücker joined the Nazi Party. He joined the CDU in 1946. He represented Cloppenburg – Vechta in the German Federal Parliament from 1953 to 1972.

From 17 October 1963 to 30 November 1966, he served as minister for Economics and Technology. From 1966 to 1969 he served as minister for the Treasury.
