= Maik Beermann =

German politician

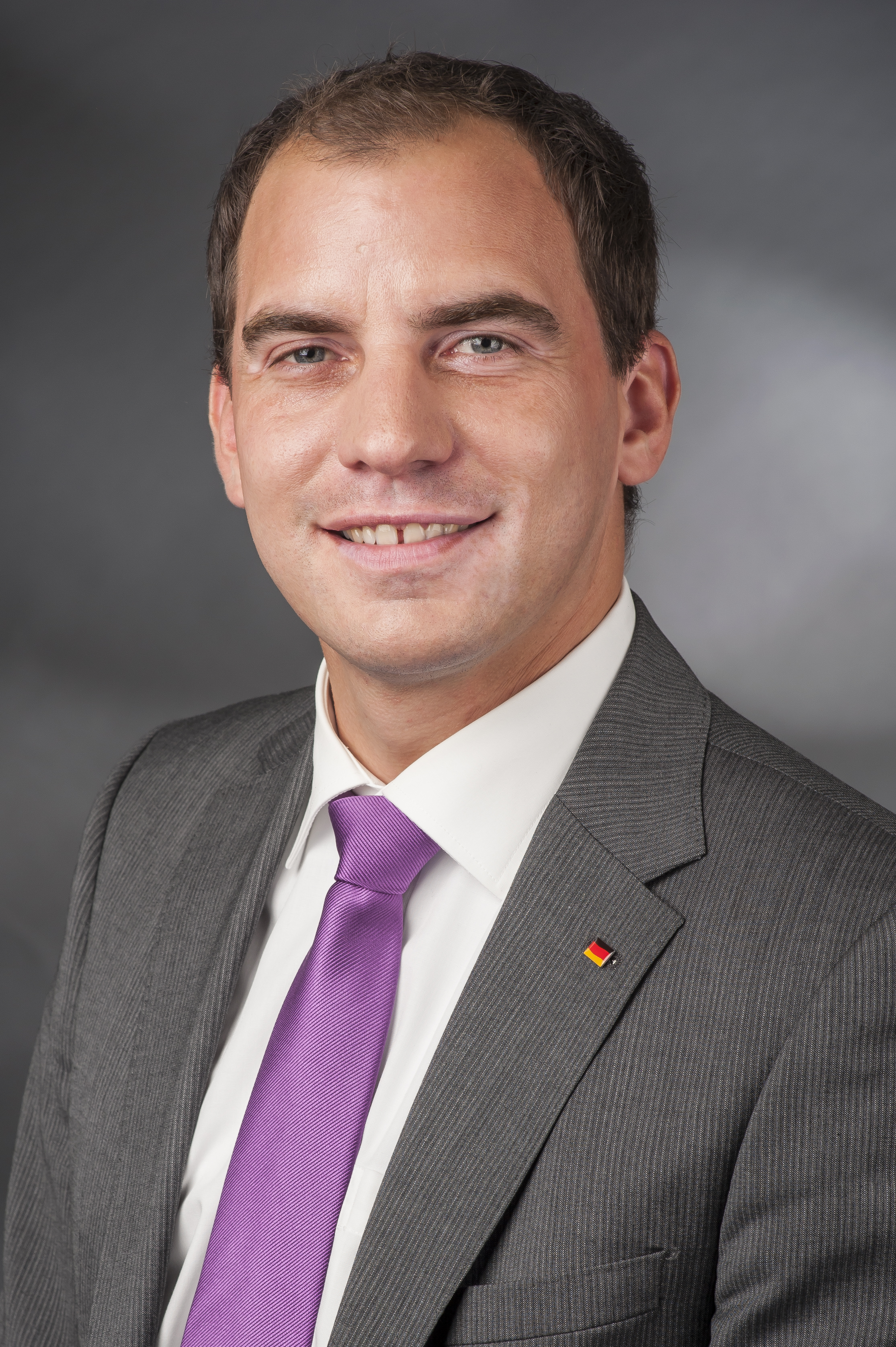
- Beermann in 2014

Member of the Bundestag; from Lower Saxony
- In office 22 October 2013 – 26 October 2021
- Preceded by: Multi-member district
- Succeeded by: Marja-Liisa Völlers
- Constituency: State list (2013–2017); Nienburg II – Schaumburg (2017–2021)

Personal details
- Born: 19 October 1981 (age 45) Nienburg/Weser, West Germany
- Party: Christian Democratic Union
- Children: 3

Maik Beermann (born 19 October 1981) is a German politician of the Christian Democratic Union (CDU) who served as a member of the German Bundestag from 2013 to 2021.

== Early life and career ==
Beermann was born in Nienburg/Weser. After completing secondary school, He trained as a banker. Since 2009 he has been Market Area Manager at Sparkasse Nienburg.

== Political career ==
Beermann joined the Junge Union in 1997 and the CDU in 2001. From 2007 to 2012 he was district chairman of the Junge Union in the district of Nienburg. Since 2001 he is active as a member of the municipal council and in 2011, he became deputy mayor of the municipality Steimbke.

From 2006 to 2016 Beermann was a member of the municipal council of Steimbke and since 2011 chairman of the school board and member of the finance committee of the municipal council. Since the local election in 2016, he is a member of the county council in the district of Nienburg and was elected deputy district councillor (Landrat). He is a member of the district committee in the district council.

=== Member of Parliament (2013–2021) ===
In the 2013 elections, Beermann ran for the direct mandate in Nienburg II – Schaumburg constituency, but couldn't win despite gaining 41.6 percent of the first votes against Sebastian Edathy. He was, however, on position 26 of the CDU state list Lower Saxony and thus elected to the Bundestag. In August 2016, he was again nominated as a direct candidate for the federal elections 2017 and again ranked 26th on the CDU state list in May 2017.

In parliament, Beermann was a full member of the Committee on Family, Senior Citizens, Women and Youth and the Committee on Digital Agenda. He is a substitute member of the Committee on Food and Agriculture as well as in the Committee on Transport and Digital Infrastructure. He was also a substitute on the Parliamentary Advisory Council on Sustainable Development. Within the CDU/CSU parliamentary group, he was a member of the Young Group.

== Life after politics ==
Since 2022, Beermann has been in charge of political communications at Dekra.

== Political positions ==
In June 2017, Beermann voted against his parliamentary group's majority and in favor of Germany's introduction of same-sex marriage.

In September 2021, Maik Beermann complains about equality for women.

== Personal life ==
Beermann is married and has three daughters. The family residents in the village of Wendenborstel of the municipality of Steimbke in the district Nienburg.
