= Landshut (electoral district) =

Federal electoral district of Germany

227 Landshut
- Electoral district for the Bundestag
- Landshut in 2025
- State: Bavaria
- Population: 343,500 (2019)
- Electorate: 246,854 (2021)
- Major settlements: Landshut; Kelheim; Mainburg
- Area: 2,305.9 km^{2}

Current electoral district
- Created: 1949
- Party: CSU
- Member: Florian Oßner
- Elected: 2013, 2017, 2021, 2025

Landshut is an electoral constituency (German: Wahlkreis) represented in the Bundestag. It elects one member via first-past-the-post voting. Under the current constituency numbering system, it is designated as constituency 227. It is located in southeastern Bavaria, comprising the city of Landshut, the Kelheim district, and most of the Landkreis Landshut district.

Landshut was created for the inaugural 1949 federal election. Since 2013, it has been represented by Florian Oßner of the Christian Social Union (CSU).

== Geography ==
Landshut is located in southeastern Bavaria. As of the 2021 federal election, it comprises the independent city of Landshut, the Kelheim district, and the Landkreis Landshut district excluding the Verwaltungsgemeinschaften of Gerzen and Wörth a.d.Isar.

== History ==
Landshut was created in 1949. In the 1949 election, it was Bavaria constituency 14 in the numbering system. In the 1953 through 1961 elections, it was number 209. In the 1965 through 1998 elections, it was number 214. In the 2002 and 2005 elections, it was number 229. In the 2009 through 2021 elections, it was number 228. From the 2025 election, it has been number 227.

Originally, the constituency comprised the independent city of Landshut and the districts of Landkreis Landshut, Kelheim, Mainburg, and Rottenburg an der Laaber. In the 1976 through 2013 elections, it comprised the city of Landshut and the districts of Landkreis Landshut and Kelheim. In the 2017 election, it lost the Verwaltungsgemeinschaft of Gerzen from the Landkreis Landshut district. In the 2021 election, it lost the Wörth a.d.Isar Verwaltungsgemeinschaft.

Election	No.	Name	Borders
1949	14	Landshut	Landshut city; Landkreis Landshut district; Kelheim district; Mainburg district; Rottenburg an der Laaber district
1953	209	Landshut	Landshut city; Landkreis Landshut district; Kelheim district; Mainburg district; Rottenburg an der Laaber district
1957	209	Landshut	Landshut city; Landkreis Landshut district; Kelheim district; Mainburg district; Rottenburg an der Laaber district
1961	209	Landshut	Landshut city; Landkreis Landshut district; Kelheim district; Mainburg district; Rottenburg an der Laaber district
1965	214	Landshut	Landshut city; Landkreis Landshut district; Kelheim district; Mainburg district; Rottenburg an der Laaber district
1969	214	Landshut	Landshut city; Landkreis Landshut district; Kelheim district; Mainburg district; Rottenburg an der Laaber district
1972	214	Landshut	Landshut city; Landkreis Landshut district; Kelheim district; Mainburg district; Rottenburg an der Laaber district
1976	214	Landshut	Landshut city; Landkreis Landshut district; Kelheim district
1980	214	Landshut	Landshut city; Landkreis Landshut district; Kelheim district
1983	214	Landshut	Landshut city; Landkreis Landshut district; Kelheim district
1987	214	Landshut	Landshut city; Landkreis Landshut district; Kelheim district
1990	214	Landshut	Landshut city; Landkreis Landshut district; Kelheim district
1994	214	Landshut	Landshut city; Landkreis Landshut district; Kelheim district
1998	214	Landshut	Landshut city; Landkreis Landshut district; Kelheim district
2002	229	Landshut	Landshut city; Landkreis Landshut district; Kelheim district
2005	229	Landshut	Landshut city; Landkreis Landshut district; Kelheim district
2009	228	Landshut	Landshut city; Landkreis Landshut district; Kelheim district
2013	228	Landshut	Landshut city; Landkreis Landshut district; Kelheim district
2017	228	Landshut	Landshut city; Landkreis Landshut district (excluding Gerzen Verwaltungsgemeinschaft); Kelheim district
2021	228	Landshut	Landshut city; Landkreis Landshut district (excluding Gerzen and Wörth a.d.Isar Verwaltungsgemeinschaft); Kelheim district
2025	227	Landshut	Landshut city; Landkreis Landshut district (excluding Gerzen and Wörth a.d.Isar Verwaltungsgemeinschaft); Kelheim district

== Members ==
The constituency has been held by the Christian Social Union (CSU) during all but one Bundestag term since its creation. It was first represented by Elimar Freiherr von Fürstenberg from 1949 to 1953. He was elected for the Bavaria Party (BP), but joined the CSU in January 1951. Hans Schuberth won it for the CSU in 1953 and served one term. He was succeeded by Friedrich Zimmermann, who was representative from 1957 to 1990, a total of nine consecutive terms. Wolfgang Götzer served from 1990 to 2013. Florian Oßner was elected in 2013, and re-elected in 2017 and 2021.

Election	Member	Party	%
1949	Elimar Freiherr von Fürstenberg (Note: Freiherr von Fürstenberg was elected for the Bavaria Party, but left the party in November 1950 and joined the CSU in January 1951.)	BP	32.9
1949	Elimar Freiherr von Fürstenberg	CSU	32.9
1953	Hans Schuberth	CSU	49.7
1957	Friedrich Zimmermann	CSU	59.8
1961	Friedrich Zimmermann	CSU	60.3
1965	Friedrich Zimmermann	CSU	63.9
1969	Friedrich Zimmermann	CSU	58.6
1972	Friedrich Zimmermann	CSU	61.1
1976	Friedrich Zimmermann	CSU	66.1
1980	Friedrich Zimmermann	CSU	63.1
1983	Friedrich Zimmermann	CSU	66.3
1987	Friedrich Zimmermann	CSU	57.4
1990	Wolfgang Götzer	CSU	55.6
1994	Wolfgang Götzer	CSU	57.8
1998	Wolfgang Götzer	CSU	56.0
2002	Wolfgang Götzer	CSU	65.7
2005	Wolfgang Götzer	CSU	59.0
2009	Wolfgang Götzer	CSU	50.5
2013	Florian Oßner	CSU	58.1
2017	Florian Oßner	CSU	39.6
2021	Florian Oßner	CSU	36.4
2025	Florian Oßner	CSU	34.2

== Election results ==
=== 2025 election ===
Federal election (2025): Landshut
Notes:	Blue background denotes the winner of the electorate vote. Pink background denotes a candidate elected from their party list. Yellow background denotes an electorate win by a list member, or other incumbent. A ✓ or ✗ denotes status of any incumbent, win or lose respectively.						
Party	Candidate	Votes	%	±%	Party votes	%	±%
CSU	✓ Florian Oßner	71,014	34.2	▼2.2	75,251	36.2	▲3.2
AfD	Elena Fritz	42,148	20.3	▲10.4	46,439	22.4	▲12.1
FW	Peter Dreier	38,336	18.5	▲8.1	19,279	9.3	▼2.9
SPD	Anja König	18,819	9.1	▼2.5	19,652	9.5	▼6.4
Greens	Maria Krieger	17,136	8.3	▼3.0	18,059	8.7	▼1.6
Left	Mascha Buchwald	7,564	3.6	▲1.6	9,600	4.6	▲2.5
FDP	Nicole Anna Elisabeth Bauer	6,437	3.1	▼8.6	7,728	3.7	▼6.7
BSW					6,055	2.9	
APT	Gertraud Maria Magdalena Götz-Volkmann	2,091	1.0	▼0.9	1,567	0.8	▼0.4
ÖDP	Dr. Max Huber	1,895	0.9	▼0.6	1,082	0.5	▼0.2
Volt	Andreas Robert Janker	1,071	0.5		832	0.4	▲0.3
PARTEI					692	0.3	▼0.2
dieBasis					603	0.3	▼1.1
BP	Florian Geisenfelder	879	0.4	▼0.7	464	0.2	▼0.4
BD					168	0.1	
Humanists					127	0.1	Steady
MLPD					33	0.0	Steady
Informal votes		874			633		
Total valid votes		207,390			207,631		
Turnout		208,264	84.6	▲5.4			
CSU hold	Majority	28,866	13.9	▼10.8			

=== 2021 election ===
Federal election (2021): Landshut
Notes:	Blue background denotes the winner of the electorate vote. Pink background denotes a candidate elected from their party list. Yellow background denotes an electorate win by a list member, or other incumbent. A ✓ or ✗ denotes status of any incumbent, win or lose respectively.						
Party	Candidate	Votes	%	±%	Party votes	%	±%
CSU	✓ Florian Oßner	70,685	36.4	▼3.1	64,383	33.1	▼6.4
FDP	Nicole Bauer	22,774	11.7	▲3.2	20,204	10.4	▲0.3
SPD	Vincent Hogenkamp	22,468	11.6	▼2.0	30,931	15.9	▲2.8
Greens	Maria Krieger	21,811	11.2	▲4.7	20,087	10.3	▲3.0
FW	Kerstin Haimerl-Kunze	20,072	10.3	▼1.4	23,747	12.2	▲6.7
AfD	Elena Fritz	19,184	9.9	▼2.6	19,973	10.3	▼4.3
Left	Veronika Lackerbauer	3,955	2.0	▼1.6	4,186	2.1	▼2.7
Tierschutzpartei	Gertraud Götz-Volkmann	3,615	1.9		2,257	1.2	▲0.2
ÖDP	Bernd Wimmer	2,888	1.5	▼0.6	1,425	0.7	▼0.4
dieBasis	Marion Schmidt	2,796	1.4		2,737	1.4	
BP	Robert Neuhauser	2,241	1.2	▼0.6	1,237	0.6	▼0.7
PARTEI					1,060	0.5	0.0
Independent	Gerhard Pettenkoffer	1,061	0.5				
Pirates					559	0.3	0.0
Team Todenhöfer					458	0.2	
Independent	Robert Manz	400	0.2				
Volt					290	0.1	
Unabhängige					253	0.1	
Gesundheitsforschung					209	0.1	0.0
V-Partei3					168	0.1	▼0.1
NPD					127	0.1	▼0.2
Humanists					129	0.1	
Bündnis C					99	0.1	
du.					95	0.0	
The III. Path					88	0.0	
DKP					24	0.0	0.0
LKR					23	0.0	
MLPD					17	0.0	0.0
Informal votes		1,639			823		
Total valid votes		193,950			194,766		
Turnout		195,589	79.2	▲2.0			
CSU hold	Majority	47,911	24.7	▼1.3			

=== 2017 election ===
Federal election (2017): Landshut
Notes:	Blue background denotes the winner of the electorate vote. Pink background denotes a candidate elected from their party list. Yellow background denotes an electorate win by a list member, or other incumbent. A ✓ or ✗ denotes status of any incumbent, win or lose respectively.						
Party	Candidate	Votes	%	±%	Party votes	%	±%
CSU	✓ Florian Oßner	75,702	39.6	▼18.3	75,521	39.4	▼14.5
SPD	Anja König	25,970	13.6	▼2.7	25,095	13.1	▼2.9
AfD	Günter Straßberger	24,080	12.6		28,061	14.6	▲11.0
FW	Hubert Aiwanger	22,378	11.7	▲5.8	10,631	5.5	▲0.2
FDP	Nicole Bauer	16,297	8.5	▲5.5	19,361	10.1	▲5.4
Greens	Petra Seifert	12,514	6.5	▼1.7	13,856	7.2	▲0.5
Left	Dinar Erkan	6,869	3.6	▲0.7	9,270	4.8	▲1.8
ÖDP	Stefan Zellner	3,979	2.1	▼0.3	2,133	1.1	▼0.2
BP	Florian Geisenfelder	3,446	1.8		2,557	1.3	▼0.1
Tierschutzpartei					1,758	0.9	▲0.1
PARTEI					976	0.5	
Pirates					612	0.3	▼1.2
NPD					504	0.3	▼0.5
V-Partei³					324	0.2	
DiB					260	0.1	
Gesundheitsforschung					239	0.1	
BGE					237	0.1	
DM					224	0.1	
MLPD					30	0.0	0.0
DKP					29	0.0	
BüSo					22	0.0	0.0
Informal votes		1,731			1,266		
Total valid votes		191,235			191,700		
Turnout		192,966	77.2	▲9.0			
CSU hold	Majority	49,732	26.0	▼15.9			

=== 2013 election ===
Federal election (2013): Landshut
Notes:	Blue background denotes the winner of the electorate vote. Pink background denotes a candidate elected from their party list. Yellow background denotes an electorate win by a list member, or other incumbent. A ✓ or ✗ denotes status of any incumbent, win or lose respectively.						
Party	Candidate	Votes	%	±%	Party votes	%	±%
CSU	Florian Oßner	98,703	58.1	▲7.6	92,069	54.0	▲5.4
SPD	Harald Unfried	27,537	16.2	▲1.1	27,160	15.9	▲2.0
Greens	Thomas Gambke	14,085	8.3	▼1.9	11,427	6.7	▼2.1
FW	Christian Hanika	10,042	5.9		9,038	5.3	
FDP	Markus Sponbrucker	5,147	3.0	▼10.6	7,989	4.7	▼9.5
AfD					6,111	3.6	
Left	Reinhard Zisler	4,920	2.9	▼2.7	5,161	3.0	▼2.6
ÖDP	Stefan Zellner	4,002	2.4	▼0.1	2,176	1.3	▼0.3
Pirates	Matthias Zehe	3,349	2.0		2,642	1.6	▼0.1
BP					2,464	1.4	▲0.6
NPD	Wolfgang Rochner	2,211	1.3	▼0.7	1,378	0.8	▼0.6
Tierschutzpartei					1,328	0.8	▲0.1
REP					489	0.3	▼0.5
DIE FRAUEN					309	0.2	
DIE VIOLETTEN					274	0.2	▼0.3
Party of Reason					181	0.1	
PRO					153	0.1	
RRP					40	0.0	▼0.4
BüSo					27	0.0	0.0
MLPD					22	0.0	0.0
Informal votes		1,648			1,206		
Total valid votes		169,996			170,438		
Turnout		171,644	68.3	▼1.0			
CSU hold	Majority	71,166	41.9	▲6.5			

=== 2009 election ===
Federal election (2009): Landshut
Notes:	Blue background denotes the winner of the electorate vote. Pink background denotes a candidate elected from their party list. Yellow background denotes an electorate win by a list member, or other incumbent. A ✓ or ✗ denotes status of any incumbent, win or lose respectively.						
Party	Candidate	Votes	%	±%	Party votes	%	±%
CSU	✓ Wolfgang Götzer	84,953	50.5	▼8.5	82,466	48.7	▼6.8
SPD	Harald Unfried	25,337	15.1	▼7.1	23,634	13.9	▼7.7
FDP	Christoph Zeitler	22,940	13.6	▲6.6	24,031	14.2	▲4.9
Greens	Thomas Gambke	17,133	10.2	▲3.5	15,002	8.9	▲2.9
Left	Kornelia Möller	9,362	5.6	▲2.7	9,554	5.6	▲2.6
Pirates					2,843	1.7	
ÖDP	Günter Miß	4,051	2.4		2,635	1.6	
NPD	Wolfgang Rochner	3,295	2.0	▼0.3	2,373	1.4	▼0.2
REP					1,373	0.8	0.0
BP					1,397	0.8	▲0.1
Tierschutzpartei					1,172	0.7	
FAMILIE					1,152	0.7	▼0.1
DIE VIOLETTEN	Ingrid Hetz	1,176	0.7		710	0.4	
RRP					705	0.4	
CM					155	0.1	
PBC					130	0.1	0.0
DVU					80	0.0	
BüSo					41	0.0	0.0
MLPD					28	0.0	0.0
Informal votes		2,818			1,584		
Total valid votes		168,247			169,481		
Turnout		171,065	69.3	▼7.6			
CSU hold	Majority	59,616	35.4	▼1.4			

=== 2005 election ===
Federal election (2005):Landshut
Notes:	Blue background denotes the winner of the electorate vote. Pink background denotes a candidate elected from their party list. Yellow background denotes an electorate win by a list member, or other incumbent. A ✓ or ✗ denotes status of any incumbent, win or lose respectively.						
Party	Candidate	Votes	%	±%	Party votes	%	±%
CSU	✓ Wolfgang Götzer	107,698	59.0	▼6.8	102,023	55.4	▼11.7
SPD	Harald Unfried	40,546	22.2	▼1.1	39,785	21.6	▲0.8
FDP	Christoph Zeitler	12,895	7.1	▲2.0	17,012	9.2	▲5.6
Greens	Thomas Gambke	12,223	6.7	▲0.8	11,039	6.0	▲0.4
Left	Martin Brennecke	5,195	2.8		5,583	3.0	▲2.5
NPD	Walter Löffler	4,118	2.3		2,906	1.6	▲1.3
REP					1,533	0.8	▲0.
Familie					1,376	0.7	
BP					1,363	0.7	▲0.6
GRAUEN					517	0.3	▲0.2
Feminist					446	0.2	▲0.1
PBC					233	0.1	▲0.1
BüSo					124	0.1	▲0.1
MLPD					62	0.0	
Informal votes		3,412			2,085		
Total valid votes		182,675			184,002		
Turnout		186,087	76.9	▼4.4			
CSU hold	Majority	67,152	36.8				
