= Neu-Ulm (electoral district) =

Federal electoral district of Germany

254 Neu-Ulm
- Electoral district for the Bundestag
- Neu-Ulm in 2025
- State: Bavaria
- Population: 337,500 (2019)
- Electorate: 215,190 (2025)
- Major settlements: Neu-Ulm; Senden; Günzburg
- Area: 1,278.3 km^{2}

Current electoral district
- Created: 1949
- Party: CSU
- Member: Alexander Engelhard
- Elected: 2021, 2025

Neu-Ulm is an electoral constituency (German: Wahlkreis) represented in the Bundestag. It elects one member via first-past-the-post voting. Under the current constituency numbering system, it is designated as constituency 254. It is located in southwestern Bavaria, comprising the Günzburg and Neu-Ulm districts.

Neu-Ulm was created for the inaugural 1949 federal election. Since 2021, it has been represented by Alexander Engelhard of the Christian Social Union (CSU).

== Geography ==
Neu-Ulm is located in southwestern Bavaria. As of the 2025 federal election, it comprises the districts of Günzburg and Neu-Ulm.

== History ==
Neu-Ulm was created in 1949, then known as Dillingen. It acquired its current name in the 1965 election. In the 1949 election, it was Bavaria constituency 43 in the numbering system. In the 1953 through 1961 elections, it was number 238. In the 1965 through 1998 elections, it was number 241. In the 2002 and 2005 elections, it was number 256. In the 2009 through 2021 elections, it was number 255. From the 2025 election, it has been number 254.

Originally, the constituency comprised the independent cities of Neu-Ulm, Dillingen an der Donau, and Günzburg and the districts of Landkreis Neu-Ulm, Landkreis Dillingen an der Donau, and Landkreis Günzburg. In the 1965 through 1972 elections, it lost the city and district of Dillingen an der Donau while gaining the districts of Illertissen and Krumbach. In the 1976 through 1990 elections, it comprised the districts of Neu-Ulm and Günzburg. It acquired the northern part of Unterallgäu district in the 1994 election. Ahead of the 2025 election, the constituency was reduced to Neu-Ulm and Günzburg.

Election	No.	Name	Borders
1949	43	Dillingen	Neu-Ulm city; Dillingen an der Donau city; Günzburg city; Landkreis Neu-Ulm district; Landkreis Dillingen an der Donau district; Landkreis Günzburg district
1953	238	Dillingen	Neu-Ulm city; Dillingen an der Donau city; Günzburg city; Landkreis Neu-Ulm district; Landkreis Dillingen an der Donau district; Landkreis Günzburg district
1957	238	Dillingen	Neu-Ulm city; Dillingen an der Donau city; Günzburg city; Landkreis Neu-Ulm district; Landkreis Dillingen an der Donau district; Landkreis Günzburg district
1961	238	Dillingen	Neu-Ulm city; Dillingen an der Donau city; Günzburg city; Landkreis Neu-Ulm district; Landkreis Dillingen an der Donau district; Landkreis Günzburg district
1965	241	Neu-Ulm	Neu-Ulm city; Günzburg city; Landkreis Neu-Ulm district; Landkreis Günzburg district; Illertissen district; Krumbach district
1969	241	Neu-Ulm	Neu-Ulm city; Günzburg city; Landkreis Neu-Ulm district; Landkreis Günzburg district; Illertissen district; Krumbach district
1972	241	Neu-Ulm	Neu-Ulm city; Günzburg city; Landkreis Neu-Ulm district; Landkreis Günzburg district; Illertissen district; Krumbach district
1976	241	Neu-Ulm	Neu-Ulm district; Günzburg district
1980	241	Neu-Ulm	Neu-Ulm district; Günzburg district
1983	241	Neu-Ulm	Neu-Ulm district; Günzburg district
1987	241	Neu-Ulm	Neu-Ulm district; Günzburg district
1990	241	Neu-Ulm	Neu-Ulm district; Günzburg district
1994	241	Neu-Ulm	Neu-Ulm district; Günzburg district; Unterallgäu district (only Babenhausen, Boos, Erkheim, and Pfaffenhausen Verwaltungsgemeinschaften)
1998	241	Neu-Ulm	Neu-Ulm district; Günzburg district; Unterallgäu district (only Babenhausen, Boos, Erkheim, and Pfaffenhausen Verwaltungsgemeinschaften)
2002	256	Neu-Ulm	Neu-Ulm district; Günzburg district; Unterallgäu district (only Babenhausen, Boos, Erkheim, and Pfaffenhausen Verwaltungsgemeinschaften)
2005	256	Neu-Ulm	Neu-Ulm district; Günzburg district; Unterallgäu district (only Babenhausen, Boos, Erkheim, and Pfaffenhausen Verwaltungsgemeinschaften)
2009	255	Neu-Ulm	Neu-Ulm district; Günzburg district; Unterallgäu district (only Babenhausen, Boos, Erkheim, and Pfaffenhausen Verwaltungsgemeinschaften)
2013	255	Neu-Ulm	Neu-Ulm district; Günzburg district; Unterallgäu district (only Babenhausen, Boos, Erkheim, and Pfaffenhausen Verwaltungsgemeinschaften)
2017	255	Neu-Ulm	Neu-Ulm district; Günzburg district; Unterallgäu district (only Babenhausen, Boos, Erkheim, and Pfaffenhausen Verwaltungsgemeinschaften)
2021	255	Neu-Ulm	Neu-Ulm district; Günzburg district; Unterallgäu district (only Babenhausen, Boos, Erkheim, and Pfaffenhausen Verwaltungsgemeinschaften)
2025	254	Neu-Ulm	Neu-Ulm district; Günzburg district

== Members ==
The constituency has been held continuously by the Christian Social Union (CSU) since its creation. It was first represented by Hans Schütz from 1949 to 1965, followed by Leo Wagner from 1965 to 1976. Theo Waigel, leader of the CSU from 1988 to 1999, was representative from 1976 to 2002. Georg Nüßlein was representative from 2002 to 2021. Nüßlein resigned from the CSU in March 2021 and served as an independent for the remainder of his term. He was succeeded by Alexander Engelhard in 2021, who was re-elected in 2025.

Election	Member	Party	%
1949	Hans Schütz	CSU	35.5
1953	Hans Schütz	CSU	52.2
1957	Hans Schütz	CSU	63.8
1961	Hans Schütz	CSU	58.6
1965	Leo Wagner	CSU	62.5
1969	Leo Wagner	CSU	59.8
1972	Leo Wagner	CSU	59.1
1976	Theo Waigel	CSU	61.8
1980	Theo Waigel	CSU	61.2
1983	Theo Waigel	CSU	66.7
1987	Theo Waigel	CSU	62.5
1990	Theo Waigel	CSU	63.1
1994	Theo Waigel	CSU	58.6
1998	Theo Waigel	CSU	54.8
2002	Georg Nüßlein (Note: Nüßlein was elected for the CSU, but left the party in March 2021.)	CSU	61.4
2005	Georg Nüßlein	CSU	56.8
2009	Georg Nüßlein	CSU	50.7
2013	Georg Nüßlein	CSU	57.5
2017	Georg Nüßlein	CSU	44.6
2017	Georg Nüßlein	Ind.	44.6
2021	Alexander Engelhard	CSU	37.2
2025	Alexander Engelhard	CSU	42.5

== Election results ==
=== 2025 election ===
Federal election (2025): Neu-Ulm
Notes:	Blue background denotes the winner of the electorate vote. Pink background denotes a candidate elected from their party list. Yellow background denotes an electorate win by a list member, or other incumbent. A ✓ or ✗ denotes status of any incumbent, win or lose respectively.						
Party	Candidate	Votes	%	±%	Party votes	%	±%
CSU	✓ Alexander Engelhard	75,357	42.5	▲5.5	65,849	37.0	▲5.9
AfD	Gerd Mannes	41,999	23.7	▲11.8	41,290	23.2	▲11.5
SPD	Andeas Büch	18,762	10.6	▼6.1	19,104	10.7	▼6.9
Greens	Alpay Artun	14,869	8.4	▼3.0	15,920	9.0	▼2.5
Left	Vincent Le Claire	8,006	4.5	▲2.6	9,318	5.2	▲2.8
FW	Ahmet Baygül	6,163	3.5	▼3.4	6,688	3.8	▼3.0
FDP	Henrik Hecht	5,121	2.9	▼4.9	7,349	4.1	▼7.6
BSW					6,554	3.7	
Tierschutzpartei	Stephanie Weiser	3,014	1.7	▼0.5	1,912	1.1	▼0.4
Volt	Florian Lipp	1,755	1.0	▲0.5	1,026	0.6	▲0.3
dieBasis	Ralf Müller	1,422	0.8	▼1.0	738	0.4	▼1.3
PARTEI					711	0.4	▼0.3
ÖDP					585	0.3	▼0.3
BD	Robin Miller	659	0.4		280	0.2	
BP					277	0.2	▼0.3
Humanists	Raphael Lachenmayer	264	0.1		149	0.1	Steady
MLPD					38	0.0	Steady
Informal votes		1,057			660		
Total valid votes		177,391			177,788		
Turnout		178,448	82.9	▲5.3			
CSU hold	Majority	33,358	18.8	▼2.4			

=== 2021 election ===
Federal election (2021): Neu-Ulm
Notes:	Blue background denotes the winner of the electorate vote. Pink background denotes a candidate elected from their party list. Yellow background denotes an electorate win by a list member, or other incumbent. A ✓ or ✗ denotes status of any incumbent, win or lose respectively.						
Party	Candidate	Votes	%	±%	Party votes	%	±%
CSU	Alexander Engelhard	69,676	37.2	▼7.4	59,028	31.4	▼8.4
SPD	Karl-Heinz Brunner	29,960	16.0	▲1.3	31,900	17.0	▲3.3
AfD	Gerd Mannes	22,517	12.0	▼1.6	22,293	11.9	▼3.2
Greens	Ekin Deligöz	20,621	11.0	▲1.8	20,764	11.1	▲2.8
FDP	Anke Hillmann-Richter	14,542	7.8	▲1.8	22,019	11.7	▲1.4
FW	Daniel Mayer	13,964	7.5	▲2.3	13,772	7.3	▲4.5
Tierschutzpartei	Bastian Röhm	3,980	2.1		2,716	1.4	▲0.5
dieBasis	Roman Albrecht	3,782	2.0		3,308	1.8	
Left	Xaver Merk	3,466	1.9	▼2.5	4,410	2.3	▼2.8
PARTEI					1,274	0.7	▲0.1
ÖDP	Krimhilde Dornach	1,776	0.9	▼0.4	1,212	0.6	▼0.3
Team Todenhöfer					915	0.5	
Pirates	Philipp Meier	1,707	0.9	▲0.2	927	0.5	0.0
BP					715	0.4	▼0.1
Volt	Martin Lipp	900	0.5		526	0.3	
Unabhängige					487	0.3	
Independent	Martin Langhans	443	0.2				
NPD					276	0.1	▼0.3
Gesundheitsforschung					256	0.1	0.0
Bündnis C					249	0.1	
V-Partei3					193	0.1	▼0.1
Humanists					170	0.1	
The III. Path					114	0.1	
du.					89	0.0	
LKR					48	0.0	
DKP					31	0.0	0.0
MLPD					22	0.0	0.0
Informal votes		1,479			1,099		
Total valid votes		187,334			187,714		
Turnout		188,813	78.0	▲2.1			
CSU hold	Majority	39,716	21.2	▼8.7			

=== 2017 election ===
Federal election (2017): Neu-Ulm
Notes:	Blue background denotes the winner of the electorate vote. Pink background denotes a candidate elected from their party list. Yellow background denotes an electorate win by a list member, or other incumbent. A ✓ or ✗ denotes status of any incumbent, win or lose respectively.						
Party	Candidate	Votes	%	±%	Party votes	%	±%
CSU	✓ Georg Nüßlein	80,503	44.6	▼12.9	72,104	39.9	▼12.2
SPD	Karl-Heinz Brunner	26,419	14.6	▼3.8	24,828	13.7	▼4.4
AfD	Gerhard Großkurth	24,612	13.6	▲8.9	27,327	15.1	▲9.5
Greens	Ekin Deligöz	16,519	9.2	▲1.3	14,898	8.2	▲1.7
FDP	Richard Böhringer	10,780	6.0	▲3.2	18,627	10.3	▲5.6
FW	Wolfgang Schrapp	9,222	5.1		5,142	2.8	▲1.0
Left	Elmar Heim	7,855	4.4	▲0.9	9,274	5.1	▲1.4
ÖDP	Gabriela Schimmer-Göresz	2,391	1.3	▼0.2	1,652	0.9	▼0.2
PARTEI					1,007	0.6	
BP					871	0.5	▼0.1
Pirates	Rudolf Ristl	1,287	0.7	▼1.2	858	0.5	▼1.4
NPD					853	0.5	▼1.1
Independent	Andreas Beier	788	0.4				
DM					377	0.2	
V-Partei³					337	0.2	
Gesundheitsforschung					285	0.2	
BGE					268	0.1	
DiB					217	0.1	
MLPD					39	0.0	0.0
BüSo					33	0.0	0.0
DKP					28	0.0	
Informal votes		1,669			1,270		
Total valid votes		180,376			180,775		
Turnout		182,045	76.0	▲8.0			
CSU hold	Majority	54,084	30.0	▼9.1			

=== 2013 election ===
Federal election (2013): Neu-Ulm
Notes:	Blue background denotes the winner of the electorate vote. Pink background denotes a candidate elected from their party list. Yellow background denotes an electorate win by a list member, or other incumbent. A ✓ or ✗ denotes status of any incumbent, win or lose respectively.						
Party	Candidate	Votes	%	±%	Party votes	%	±%
CSU	✓ Georg Nüßlein	91,961	57.5	▲6.8	84,598	52.8	▲8.5
SPD	Karl-Heinz Brunner	29,420	18.4	▲3.0	29,023	18.1	▲3.4
Greens	Ekin Deligöz	12,505	7.8	▼2.9	10,417	6.5	▼2.3
AfD	Dietrich Jaser	7,521	4.7		8,986	5.6	
Left	Elmar Heim	5,546	3.5	▼2.9	5,958	3.7	▼2.6
FDP	Ralf Peter	4,377	2.7	▼8.6	7,485	4.7	▼11.5
ÖDP	Gabriela Schimmer-Göresz	2,493	2.6	▼1.1	1,732	1.1	▼0.4
Pirates	Rudolf Ristl	3,085	1.9		2,990	1.9	▼0.3
FW					2,985	1.9	
NPD	Achim Kast	3,009	1.9	▼0.9	2,444	1.5	▼0.6
Tierschutzpartei					1,187	0.7	▲0.1
BP					986	0.6	0.0
REP					580	0.4	▼0.3
DIE FRAUEN					355	0.2	
DIE VIOLETTEN					185	0.1	▼0.1
Party of Reason					174	0.1	
PRO					139	0.1	
RRP					57	0.0	▼0.5
MLPD					46	0.0	0.0
BüSo					39	0.0	0.0
Informal votes		1,697			1,248		
Total valid votes		159,917			160,366		
Turnout		161,614	68.0	▼1.8			
CSU hold	Majority	62,541	39.1	▲3.8			

=== 2009 election ===
Federal election (2009): Neu-Ulm
Notes:	Blue background denotes the winner of the electorate vote. Pink background denotes a candidate elected from their party list. Yellow background denotes an electorate win by a list member, or other incumbent. A ✓ or ✗ denotes status of any incumbent, win or lose respectively.						
Party	Candidate	Votes	%	±%	Party votes	%	±%
CSU	✓ Georg Nüßlein	82,046	50.7	▼6.1	72,060	44.2	▼7.4
SPD	Karl-Heinz Brunner	24,977	15.4	▼9.3	23,937	14.7	▼8.8
FDP	Frank Berger	18,406	11.4	▲5.2	26,391	16.2	▲6.1
Greens	Ekin Deligöz	17,398	10.7	▲4.0	14,310	8.8	▲2.4
Left	Sylvia Mang	10,245	6.3	▲3.2	10,341	6.3	▲3.1
NPD	Frank Hartwig	4,483	2.8	▲0.3	3,499	2.1	▲0.3
Pirates					3,496	2.1	
ÖDP	Maximilian Wegele	4,291	2.7		2,387	1.5	
FAMILIE					1,283	0.8	▲0.1
Tierschutzpartei					1,040	0.6	
REP					1,013	0.6	▼0.4
BP					1,005	0.6	▲0.3
RRP					938	0.6	
PBC					344	0.2	▼0.1
DIE VIOLETTEN					331	0.2	
CM					250	0.2	
DVU					131	0.1	
BüSo					96	0.1	0.0
MLPD					36	0.0	0.0
Informal votes		2,832			1,790		
Total valid votes		161,846			162,888		
Turnout		164,678	69.8	▼7.1			
CSU hold	Majority	57,069	35.3	▲3.3			

=== 2005 election ===
Federal election (2005):Neu-Ulm
Notes:	Blue background denotes the winner of the electorate vote. Pink background denotes a candidate elected from their party list. Yellow background denotes an electorate win by a list member, or other incumbent. A ✓ or ✗ denotes status of any incumbent, win or lose respectively.						
Party	Candidate	Votes	%	±%	Party votes	%	±%
CSU	✓ Georg Nüßlein	99,959	56.8	▼4.5	91,317	51.6	▼8.9
SPD	Antje Esser	43,541	24.8	▼1.2	41,464	23.4	▼2.1
Greens	Ekin Deligöz	11,833	6.7	▲0.3	11,374	6.4	▲0.6
FDP	Dietrich Jaser	10,813	6.1	▲1.6	17,932	10.1	▲5.4
Left	Roland Seitz	5,453	3.1	▲2.2	5,680	3.2	▲2.6
NPD	Harry Baitschora	4,305	2.4		3,256	1.8	▲1.5
REP					1,879	1.1	▲0.2
Familie					1,258	0.7	
BP					634	0.4	▲0.3
PBC					618	0.3	▲0.1
GRAUEN					610	0.3	▲0.2
Feminist					548	0.3	▲0.2
BüSo					137	0.1	0.0
MLPD					120	0.1	
Informal votes		3,211			2,288		
Total valid votes		175,904			176,827		
Turnout		179,115	76.9	▼3.0			
CSU hold	Majority	56,418	32				
