= Florian Oßner =

German politician (born 1980)

Florian Oßner MdB
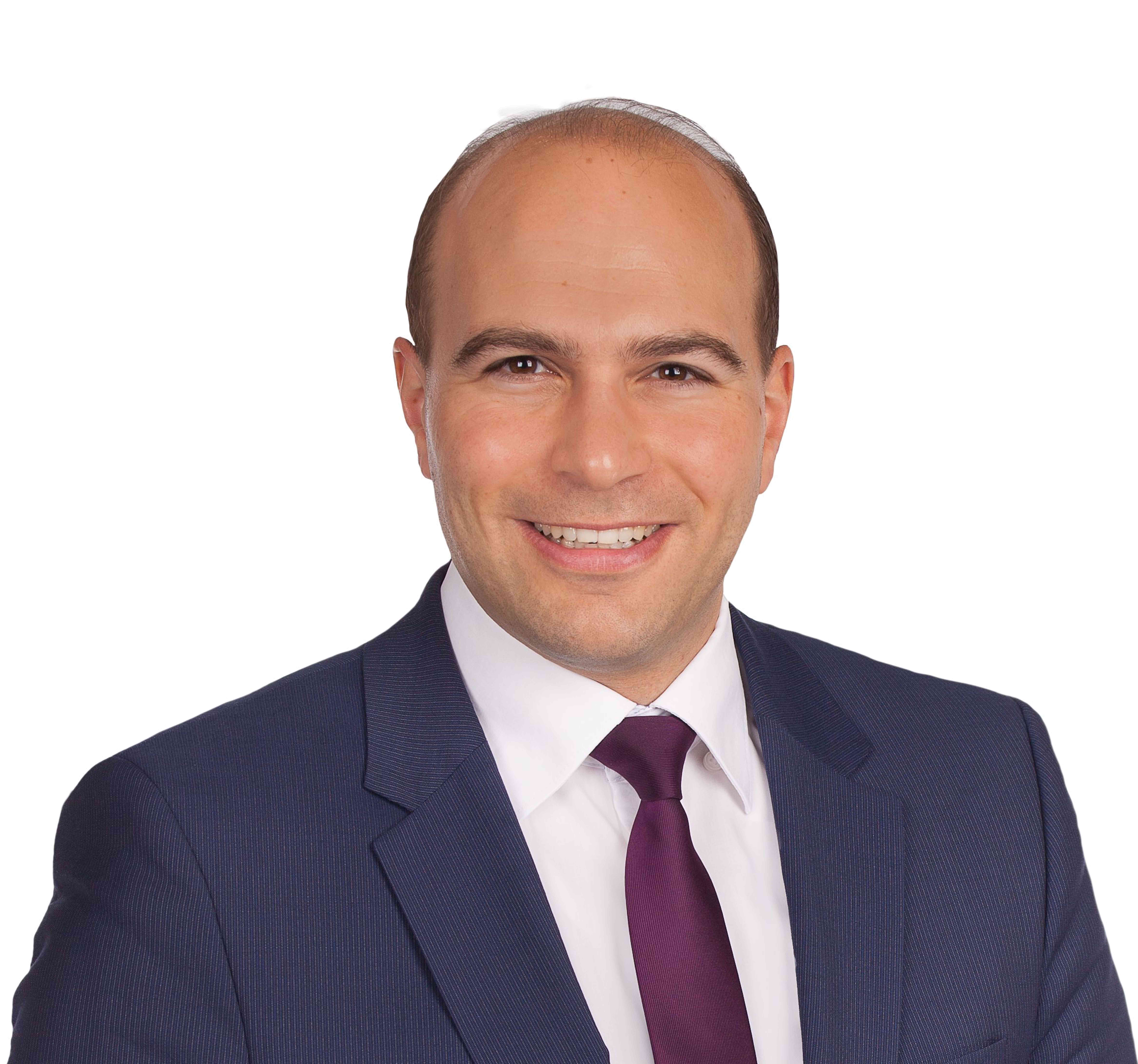
- Oßner in 2017

Member of the Bundestag; for Landshut
- Incumbent
- Assumed office 22 October 2013
- Preceded by: Wolfgang Götzer

Personal details
- Born: 5 July 1980 (age 46) Vilsbiburg, West Germany
- Party: Christian Social Union
- Children: 2
- Education: University of Regensburg; University of Gothenburg

Florian Oßner (born 5 July 1980) is a German politician of the Christian Social Union (CSU) who has been a member of the Bundestag since the 2013 German federal election.

== Political career ==
Oßner first became a member of the Bundestag in the 2013 federal election.

In parliament, Oßner has since been a member of the Budget Committee. From 2013 to 2021, he was also a member of the Committee on Transport and Digital Infrastructure. From 2014 to 2016, Oßner was one of the members of Germany's temporary National Commission on the Disposal of Radioactive Waste, chaired by Ursula Heinen-Esser and Michael Müller. Since 2025, he has been chairing the so-called Confidential Committee (Vertrauensgremium) of the Budget Committee, which provides budgetary supervision for Germany's three intelligence services, BND, BfV and MAD.

In addition to his committee assignments, Oßner is part of the German-American Parliamentary Friendship Group and the German-Austrian Parliamentary Friendship Group.

In the negotiations to form a coalition government under the leadership of Chancellor Angela Merkel following the 2017 federal elections, Oßner was part of the working group on municipalities and rural areas, led by Reiner Haseloff, Kurt Gribl and Michael Groschek.

== Other activities ==
- Federal Network Agency for Electricity, Gas, Telecommunications, Posts and Railway (BNetzA), alternative member of the Rail Infrastructure Advisory Council
