= Wolfgang Götzer =

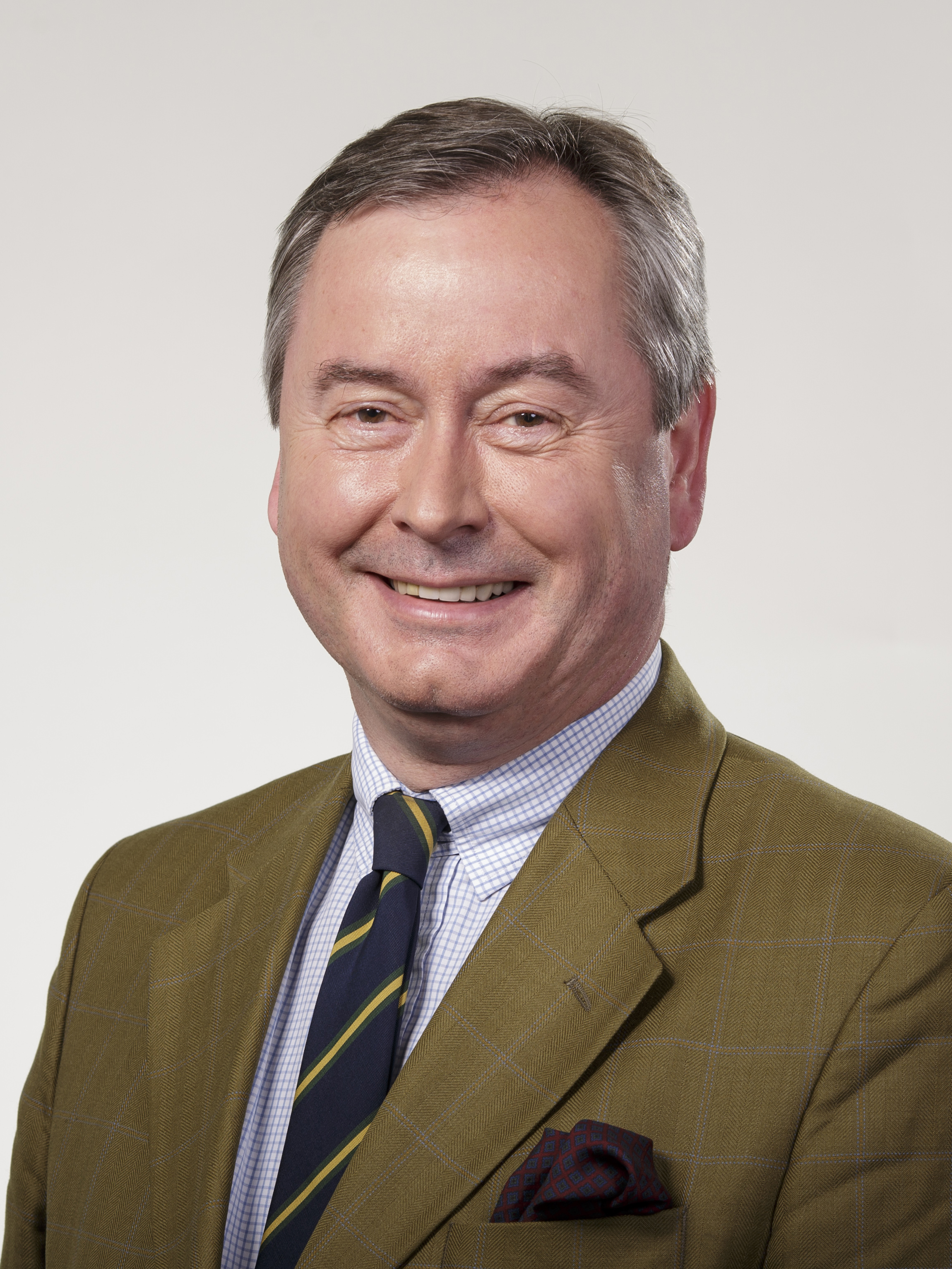
- Götzer in 2012

Member of the Bundestag
- In office 20 December 1990 – 22 October 2013
- Preceded by: Friedrich Zimmermann
- Succeeded by: Florian Oßner
- Constituency: Landshut
- In office 4 June 1984 – 18 February 1987
- Preceded by: Klaus Hartmann
- Succeeded by: Gerhard Friedrich
- Constituency: Erlangen

Personal details
- Born: 10 January 1955 (age 71) Landshut, West Germany
- Party: Christian Social Union
- Children: 2
- Education: LMU Munich; University of Würzburg

Wolfgang Götzer (born 10 January 1955 in Landshut) is a German politician. A member of the Christian Social Union in Bavaria, he served in the Bundestag from 4 June 1984 to 18 February 1987 (replacing Klaus Hartmann), and again from 20 December 1990 to 22 October 2013.
