= Franz Schausberger =

Austrian historian and politician

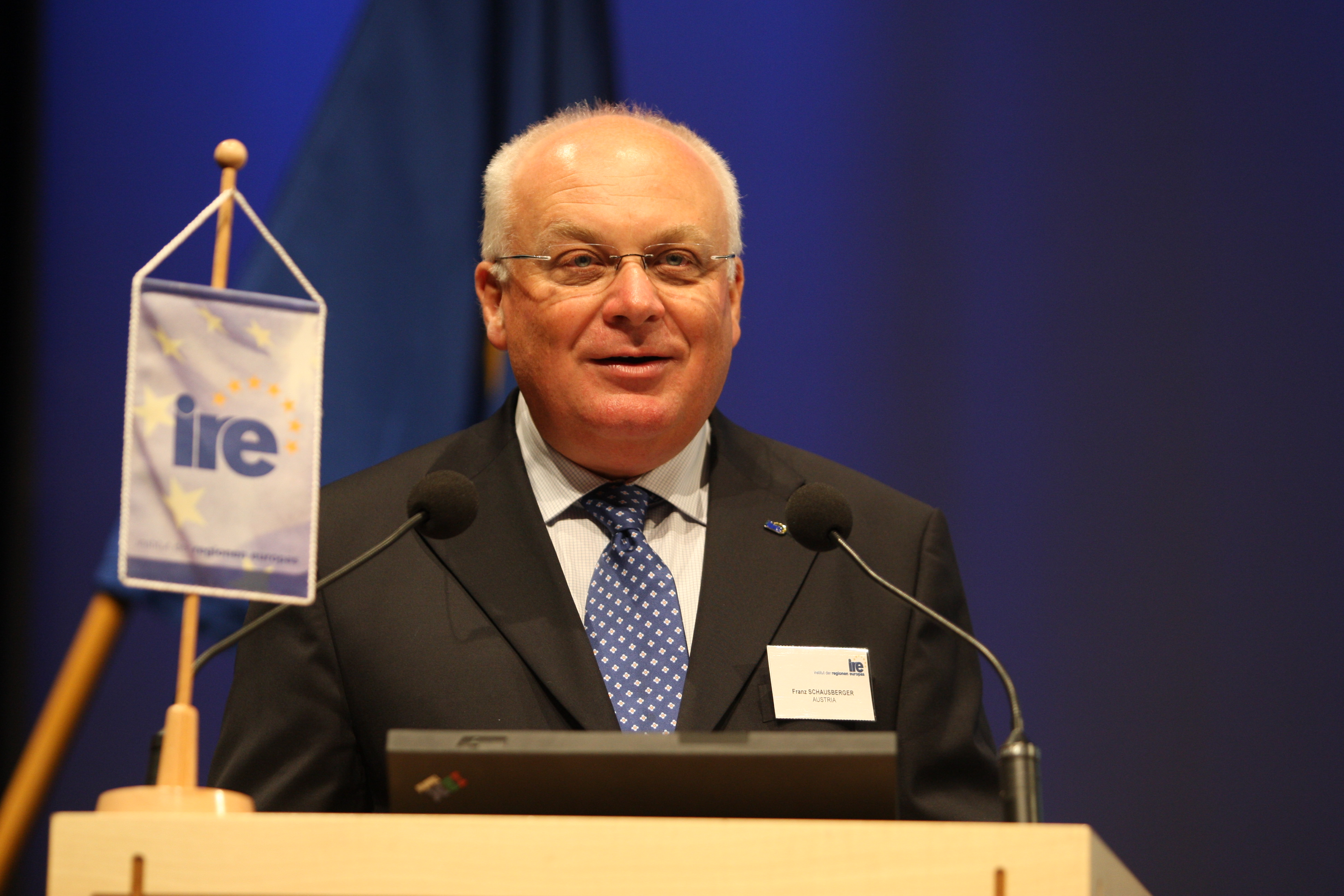
- Schausberger in 2008

Governor of Salzburg
- In office 24 April 1996 – 28 April 2004
- Preceded by: Hans Katschthaler
- Succeeded by: Gabi Burgstaller

Member of the Landtag of Land Salzburg
- In office 16 May 1979 – 23 April 1996
- Preceded by: Constituency Created

Personal details
- Born: 5 February 1950 (age 76) Steyr, Upper Austria, Austria
- Party: Austrian People's Party
- Spouse: Heidi Schausberger-Strobl
- Children: Martina, Maximilian, Alexander
- Education: University of Salzburg
- Profession: Historian

Franz Schausberger (German: [ˈʃaʊsbɛɐ̯ɡɐ]; born 5 February 1950) is an Austrian politician (ÖVP) and historian. From 24 April 1996 to 28 April 2004 he was Landeshauptmann (governor) of Salzburg.

== Early life, education, and start in politics ==
Schausberger was born in Steyr, Upper Austria, as son of Franz and Hermine Schausberger. He attended the Gymnasium, where he took his Matura exams in 1968 with distinction. He went on to study at the University of Salzburg, receiving a Doctorate in Philosophy in 1973.

During studies he was chairman of Austrian Students' Association at the University of Salzburg. From 1971 to 1979 Schausberger was Parliamentary Party Secretary of ÖVP in the Landtag (regional parliament) of Salzburg.

Schausberger is married to Heidi Schausberger-Strobl since 1988 and has three children (Martina, Maximilian and Alexander).

== Political life ==
From 1976 to 1980 Schausberger was president of the youth organisation of ÖVP Salzburg and was member of the Landtag of Salzburg from 1979 to 1996. From 1979 to 1989 he was General Secretary of ÖVP Salzburg. Between 1989 and 1996 he was chairman of the parliamentary group of ÖVP in the Landtag of Salzburg.

During the years as Landeshauptmann of Salzburg, from 1996 to 2004, he initiated among others

- the construction of the football stadium Salzburg-Kleßheim,
- the construction of the Museum der Moderne Salzburg on the Mönchsberg,
- the reconstruction of the Kleines Festspielhaus (House for Mozart)
- the construction of the Museum Carolino Augusteum at the Mozartplatz and
- the foundation of the Paracelsus Private Medical University of Salzburg.

In negotiations between 1997 and 2001 Schausberger was able to reach the financial assurance of the responsible ministries for

- the modification of the Mozarteum University Salzburg as well as for
- the construction of the university campus Unipark Nonntal.

After ÖVP’s loss of relative majority at the regional elections in 2004 Schausberger resigned from all political offices in Salzburg. His successor as Landeshauptmann was Gabriele Burgstaller (SPÖ).

Since 1996 Schausberger is the representative of Land Salzburg to the Committee of the Regions (CoR) of the European Union. From 2004 to 2006 he was chairman of the CoR’s Commission for Constitutional Affairs and European Governance, since January 2006 he is Vice-president of the European People's Party (EPP) in the CoR. He has chaired the CoR's Western Balkans Working Group for several years. In October 2016 he was appointed Special Adviser for EU enlargement, in particular for the Balkans and Ukraine by the European Commission.

Since July 2020, Schausberger has been serving as a special advisor on education in emergencies, migration and inclusion to European Commissioner for Budget and Administration Johannes Hahn.

== Academic life ==
In 1992 Schausberger founded the research institute for political-historical studies Dr.-Wilfried-Haslauer-Library in Salzburg and since then holds its presidency.

In 1996 he was awarded the qualification as a university lecturer by the University of Salzburg by presenting and defending his postdoctoral thesis on the agitation of the Nazis in Austrian federal state parliaments.

Schausberger, who holds lectures at the University of Salzburg and several other European universities, hitherto published numerous books and more than 150 publications on Austrian history and politics and the European Union.

On 1. July 2008 he was awarded the title ‘’university professor’’ by the University of West Hungary in Sopron. In 2014, the President of Austria awarded the professional title "University Professor".

In 2004 Schausberger founded the Institute of the Regions of Europe (IRE) in Salzburg and since then holds the chair of the board.

After his resignation from Salzburg’s politics he went into business for himself and manages the company European Project Analysis & Conception GmbH (EPAC).

== Honours and awards ==
- 1996: Leopold Kunschak Prize
- 1996: Grand Cross of the Royal Norwegian Order of Merit
- 1997: Grand Cross of the Order of Leopold II of the Kingdom of Belgium
- 1999: Grand Decoration of Honour in Silver with Sash for Services to the Republic of Austria
- 2002: Franz Schalk Gold Medal of the Vienna Philharmonic
- 2002: Grand Cross of the Order of Prince Henry of Portugal
- 2004: Grand Cross of the Decoration of Honour of Salzburg
- 2006: Commander's Cross of the Order for Merits to Lithuania
- 2007: Honorary Arms of the Region of Istria
- 2007: Bavarian Order of Merit
- 2012: Medal for Services to the Region of Varaždin (Croatia)
- 2013: Commander's Cross of the Order of Merit of the Republic of Hungary
- 2014: Honorary Senator of Paracelsus Private Medical University of Salzburg
- 2014: Bestowal of the title "University Professor" by the President of Austria
- 2015: Medal of Arms in Gold of the city of Salzburg
- 2015: Mérite Européen in Gold
- 2015: Ring of Honor of Land Salzburg
- 2016: Order of the Croatian Interlace
- 2018: Honorary doctorate from the Aleksandër Moisiu University in Durrës (Albania)
- 2020: Austrian Cross of Honour for Science and Art, First Class
- 2025: Grand Decoration of Honour in Gold of Vienna
- 2025: Grand Decoration of Honour in Gold of Upper Austria
- 2025: Grand Decoration of Honour in Gold of Lower Austria

He is imperial Knight of Honor of the Order of St. George.
