= Friedrich Zimmermann =

German politician (1925–2012)

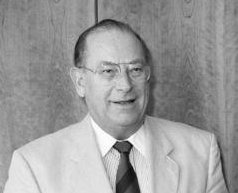
- Zimmermann in 1990

Minister of Transport
- In office 21 April 1989 – 18 January 1991
- Chancellor: Helmut Kohl
- Preceded by: Jürgen Warnke
- Succeeded by: Günther Krause

Minister of the Interior
- In office 4 October 1982 – 21 April 1989
- Chancellor: Helmut Kohl
- Preceded by: Jürgen Schmude
- Succeeded by: Wolfgang Schäuble

Bundestag First Deputy Leader of the CDU/CSU Group
- In office 15 November 1976 – 4 October 1982
- Leader: Helmut Kohl
- Preceded by: Richard Stücklen
- Succeeded by: Theo Waigel

Member of the Bundestag; for Landshut
- In office 15 October 1957 – 20 December 1990
- Preceded by: Hans Schuberth
- Succeeded by: Wolfgang Götzer

Personal details
- Born: 18 July 1925 Munich, Germany
- Died: 16 September 2012 (aged 87) Filzmoos, Austria
- Party: Christian Social Union
- Children: 2
- Education: LMU Munich

Friedrich Zimmermann (18 July 1925 – 16 September 2012) was a German politician and a member of the Christian Social Union (CSU). From 1982 to 1989, he was the federal minister of interior. From 1989 to 1991 he held the position of federal minister for transport.

== Biography ==
Zimmermann was born on 18 July 1925. He served in the Second World War between 1943 and 1945 and held a lieutenant rank. In 1946, he studied law and economics in Munich, where he received a PhD. From 1951 until 1954, he was a civil servant in Bavaria and became a lawyer in 1963.

In 1943, Zimmermann became a member of the Nazi Party. From 1948, he was a member of the CSU. In 1955, he was managing director of the CSU and then from 1956 to 1963 held the position of General Secretary.

As part of the CSU's hard-fought struggle against the Bayernpartei for political supremacy in Bavaria, Zimmermann was convicted in 1960 of perjury in connection with the Bavarian casino affair, but was finally acquitted in 1961 after a medical report that said: During the time of the oath, he had a reduced mental performance due to hypoglycaemia. In his overall assessment, however, the court explicitly stated: "there can be no talk of that the accused's innocence has been proven." According to the German Spiegel-magazine Zimmermann remarked about the expert himself: "He was named by my defense, I got it for the first time seen in the courtroom." The affair earned him the nickname "Old Schwurhand" (an allusion to a Karl May character, Old Surehand, with "Schwur" meaning oath), which haunted him throughout his life. Because of the affair, he was – in reference to Ludwig Anzengruber's play of the same name – also called "The perjury-farmer", but that was banned by a court.

From 1963 to 1967, he was treasurer of the CSU for Bavaria and from 1979 to 1989, he was vice chairman of the CSU. He was a member of the German parliament from 1957 to 1990, elected directly from the Landshut constituency. He never won less than 57.4 percent of the vote.

From October 1982 until 1989, Zimmermann served as minister of interior in the Cabinet of Chancellor Helmut Kohl. As part of a cabinet reshuffle, he was appointed minister of transport on 21 April 1989, replacing Jürgen Warnke in the post. After the parliamentary elections in 1990, he resigned from the federal government on 18 January 1991.

== Personal life and death ==
Zimmermann was a Catholic and had two children. He was in his third marriage. He died on 16 September 2012.

== Awards ==
- Bavarian Order of Merit
- Order of Merit of the Federal Republic of Germany (1976)
