= Georg Nüßlein =

German politician (born 1969)

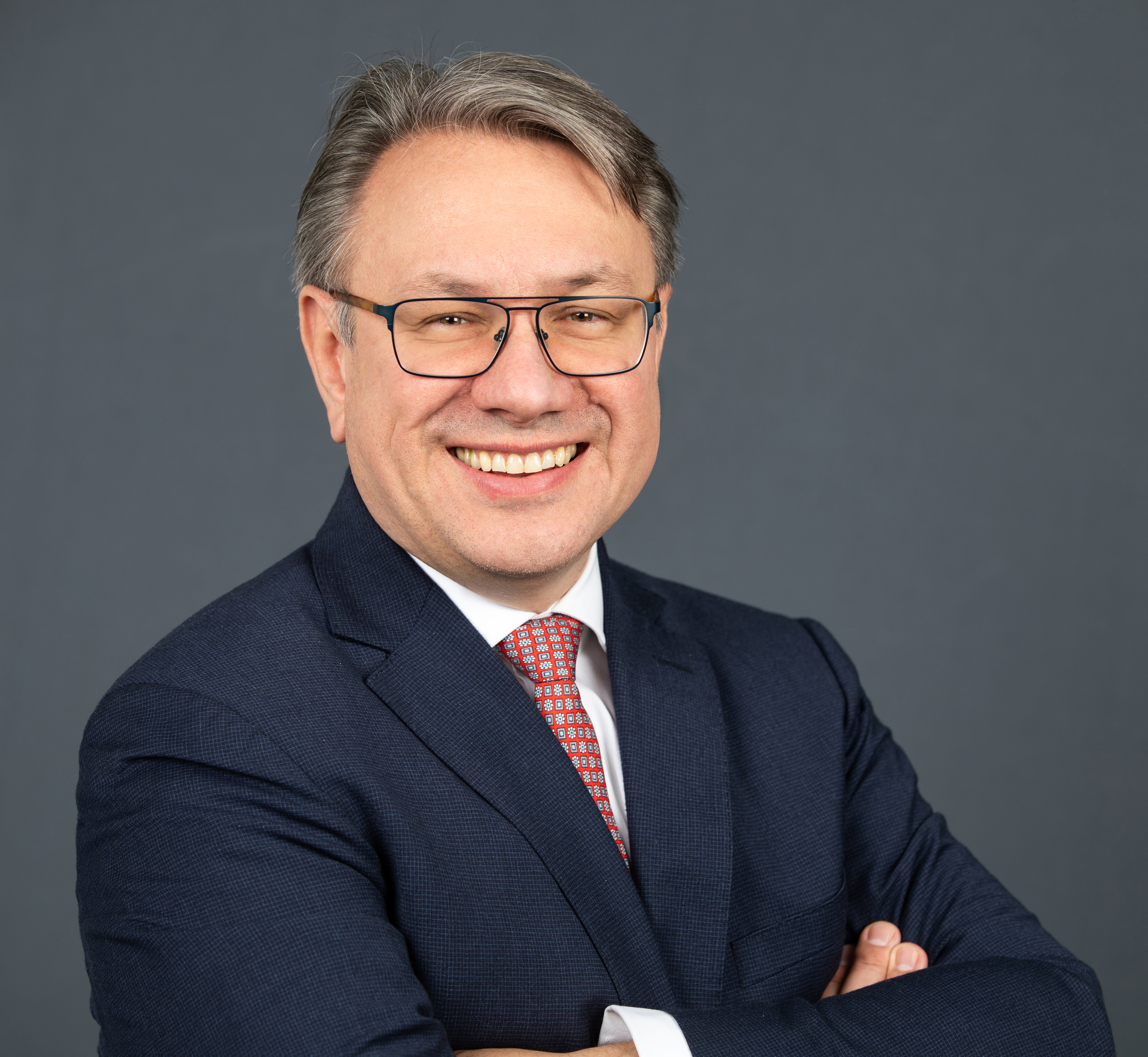
- Nüßlein in 2020

Member of the Bundestag; for Neu-Ulm
- In office 17 October 2002 – 26 October 2021
- Preceded by: Theo Waigel
- Succeeded by: Alexander Engelhard

Personal details
- Born: 10 April 1969 (age 57) Krumbach, Bavaria, West Germany
- Party: Independent (since 2021)
- Other political affiliations: CSU (1987–2021)
- Education: University of Augsburg

Georg Nüßlein (born 10 April 1969) is a German politician who served as a member of the Bundestag from the state of Bavaria from 2002 until 2021. From 1987 until 2021, he was a member of the Christian Social Union (CSU). He left the party in the wake of his loss of immunity and allegations of corruption related to the procurement of FFP2 masks ("Maskenaffäre").

== Early life and education ==
Nüßlein was born 10 April 1969 in Krumbach, Bavaria. He went to the University of Augsburg

== Political career ==
From 1993 until 2002, Nüßlein worked in the banking sector, including with Bankhaus Reuschel & Co. in Munich. Nüßlein first became a member of the Bundestag after the 2002 German federal election in Neu-Ulm (electoral district). From 2005 until 2013, he served on the Committee on Economic Affairs and the Committee on the Environment, Nature Conservation and Nuclear Safety. In the negotiations to form a Grand Coalition of Chancellor Angela Merkel's Christian Democrats and the Social Democrats (SPD) following the 2013 federal elections, Nüßlein was part of the CDU/CSU delegation in the working group on energy policy, led by Peter Altmaier and Hannelore Kraft.

From 2014, Nüßlein served as deputy chairman of the CDU/CSU parliamentary group, under the leadership of successive chairmen Volker Kauder (2014–2018) and Ralph Brinkhaus (since 2018). In this capacity, he is the group's main spokesman for environmental and health policy. From 2015 until 2016, he was part of a government-appointed commission tasked with recommending how to safeguard the funding of fulfilling Germany's exit from nuclear energy, under the leadership of co-chairs Ole von Beust, Matthias Platzeck and Jürgen Trittin.

In the negotiations to form a fourth coalition government under Merkel's leadership following the 2017 federal elections, Nüßlein led the working group on health policy, alongside Hermann Gröhe and Malu Dreyer.

=== Corruption allegations ===
In February 2021, Nüßlein's parliamentary offices were among 13 properties raided in Germany and Liechtenstein as part of a probe into suspected corruption and bribery of elected officials related to the procurement of FFP-2 masks amid the COVID-19 pandemic. He was suspected of having received a €650,000 commission for acting as a broker between a face mask manufacturer and the federal and Bavarian governments. He called the allegations baseless. His parliamentary immunity was revoked. On 7 March 2021, Nüßlein announced that he would not stand in the 2021 federal elections but instead resign from active politics by the end of the parliamentary term. On 8 March 2021, he announced that he had left the CSU after party leadership had requested he resign from Parliament immediately.

== Political positions ==
In June 2017, Nüßlein voted against Germany's introduction of same-sex marriage.

== Other activities ==
- Federal Network Agency for Electricity, Gas, Telecommunications, Post and Railway (BNetzA), Member of the Advisory Board (2014–2018)
- German Renewable Energy Federation (BEE), Member of the Advisory Board (since 2005)
- Verona's Dreams, Member of the Supervisory Board (2002)
