= Hans Schuberth =

German politician and engineer (1897–1976)

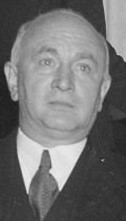
- Schuberth in 1949

Minister of Post and Telecommunications
- In office 20 September 1949 – 9 December 1953
- Chancellor: Konrad Adenauer
- Preceded by: Office established
- Succeeded by: Siegfried Balke

Member of the Bundestag; for Landshut
- In office 6 October 1953 – 15 October 1957
- Preceded by: Elimar Freiherr von Fürstenberg
- Succeeded by: Friedrich Zimmermann

Personal details
- Born: 5 April 1897 Schwabach, Germany
- Died: 2 September 1976 (aged 79) Munich, West Germany
- Party: Christian Social Union
- Education: TU Munich

Hans Schuberth (5 April 1897 – 2 September 1976) was a German politician who from 1949 to 1953 was the first Federal Minister of Post and Telecommunications in Konrad Adenauer's first cabinet.

== Early life ==
After graduation in 1914, Schuberth participated as a soldier in the First World War. After being seriously wounded, as a result of which he had to have a leg amputated, he was from 1915 to 1916 working as an intern at a machine factory in Germany in Dortmund. After he graduated in 1916 to study mechanical engineering at the Technical University of Munich, which he finished in 1920 as a graduate engineer (mechanical engineering). During his studies he became a member of the Catholic Student Association KDSt.V. Rheno - Franconia in Munich CV. He then worked as an engineer at the German Werke AG in Dachau and Munich. From 1925 to 1926, he completed an additional study of electrical engineering, which he also graduated with a diploma. He then entered 1926 in the service of the Reichspost. In 1934, he was forcibly transferred to the Reich Central Post Office in Berlin and, since he refused to join the Nazi party, no longer promoted. He worked at the Reich postal Central Directorate from 1937 in Landshut, then from 1943 in Munich.

After the Second World War, he was appointed in 1945 as Vice President of Oberpostdirektion Munich. In October 1945, he became president of the Postal Directorate Regensburg. In 1947, he was appointed President of the Munich Oberpostdirektion.

== Political career ==
In 1947, he was appointed Secretary of State for Posts and Telecommunications in the Bavarian State Ministry of Transport. From 1947 to 1949 he was then elected Director of the Department of Posts and Telecommunications in the administration of the United Economic Area in Frankfurt am Main. After the general election in 1949 he was appointed on 20 September 1949 as the Federal Minister of Post and Telecommunications in the first cabinet of Konrad Adenauer. While in this position he proposed putting the image of president Theodor Heuss on a stamp, which the latter objected against for fear of being likened with Adolf Hitler who also had stamps with his image. After the parliamentary elections of 1953, he retired under the pretext of sectarian proportional representation in the Cabinet at the request of Adenauer, who wanted above all to weaken the CSU, before the appointment of his successor in office the Protestant Siegfried Balke on 9 December 1953 to the Federal Government. Schuberth was then briefly at 1953/54, special ambassador to the Vatican.

Schuberth was a deputy of the German Bundestag from 1953 to 1957 as representative of the constituency of Landshut. In 1957, he brought together with other members of parliament from CSU and DP a bill to repeal Article 102 of the Basic Law, to reintroduce the death penalty with the objective of which, however, never came to a vote.
