= Alexander Engelhard =

German politician (born 1972)

Alexander Engelhard MdB

Member of the Bundestag; for Neu-Ulm
- Incumbent
- Assumed office 26 October 2021
- Preceded by: Georg Nüßlein

Personal details
- Born: 26 September 1972 (age 53) Ulm, West Germany
- Party: Christian Social Union
- Children: 2

Alexander Engelhard (born 26 September 1972) is a German miller and politician of the Christian Social Union of Bavaria (CSU) who has been serving as a member of the German Bundestag since 2021.

== Early life and career ==
Engelhard was born 1972 in the West German city of Ulm. Following his graduation from Technical High School in Ulm, Engelhard did an apprenticeship as a miller. After that he studied at the technical colleges in Neu-Ulm and Ulm and received a degree in industrial engineering. In 2001, Engelhard took over the old family business (Engelhardmühle) in Weißenhorn-Attenhofen and converted it into one of first organic mills in Germany.

== Political career ==
Engelhard was a member of the city council of Weißenhorn from 2002 to 2014 and has been a member of the district council of Neu-Ulm since 2002.

He ran unsuccessfully for a seat in the 2003 Bavarian state election.

After the previous CSU incumbent Georg Nüßlein did not run again, Engelhard ran a direct candidate in the Neu-Ulm federal constituency in the 2021 federal election. He won the direct mandate with 37.2% of the first votes. In the Bundestag, Engelhard is a member of the Committee for the Environment, Nature Conservation, Nuclear Safety and Consumer Protection.

== Other activities ==
- Nuclear Waste Disposal Fund (KENFO), Alternate Member of the Board of Trustees (since 2025)

== Personal life ==
Engelhard is married and is the father of two daughters. He is of Roman Catholic denomination.
