= Leo Wagner =

German politician (1919–2006)

Member of the Bundestag; from Bavaria
- In office 17 October 1961 – 14 December 1976
- Preceded by: Multi-member district
- Succeeded by: Theo Waigel
- Constituency: State list (1961–1965); Neu-Ulm (1965–1976)

Personal details
- Born: 13 May 1919 Munich, Germany
- Died: 8 November 2006 (aged 87) Günzburg, West Germany
- Party: Christian Social Union
- Spouse(s): Elfriede Wagner (m. 1945; died 1980) Brigitte Wagner (after 1980)
- Children: 3
- Occupation: Politician

Leo Wagner (13 May 1919 – 8 November 2006) was a German politician (CSU). Between 1961 and his resignation from it, formally at the end of 1976, he served as a member of the West German Bundestag. For many years he was part of the inner political circle around the party leader, Franz Josef Strauss.

During the 1970s Wagner became a focus of public interest on account of widespread suspicions involving the interaction between his personal habits and his public duties. Allegations became harder to refute following a trial in 1974/75, at the end of which Wagner was convicted of credit fraud. He received only a suspended sentence. However, during the trial it also emerged that in 1972 Wagner had received a loan of precisely 50,000 Marks from an undisclosed source. Both the amount and the date were significant, since it had become known that another Bundestag member, Julius Steiner had accepted a bribe of that amount from the East German security services in order to vote against his own party in a crucial “constructive confidence vote“ which the Brandt government won by just two votes, somewhat to the surprise of a number of well-informed political commentators and of the chancellor himself. Leo Wagner continued to deny that he had accepted a bribe from East German agents to vote against his own party and in support of the Brandt government, but by the time an 80 minute documentary film of the affair was produced by his grandson nearly half a century later, there was no longer any need to preface reports of the matter with the adjective "allegedly“.

== Early life ==
Leo Wagner was born in Munich during the wave of revolutions that swept across German posts and cities during the immediate aftermath of World War I. His father, whom he would later describe as "his inspiration“, had undertaken as series of jobs, most recently as a police inspector. He came originally from Ellingen (Weißenburg-Gunzenhausen) in Middle Franconia. Wagner passed his school final exams in 1937, and went on to enroll at the “Hochschule für Lehrerbildung“ (government controlled teacher training college) in Munich. Leo Wagner was 20 in September 1939 when war broke out. Between 1939 and 1945 he served as a radio operator. During the first part of 1945, as the Nazi regime crumbled in the face of military defeat from east and west, Leo Wagner found himself recuperating in a Hanover hospital from the wounds that left him classified as "war wounded“. Before the war ended he had discharged himself and made his way on foot the 650 km (400 miles) cross-country to Günzburg, the home city of the woman who by May 1945 had become his wife. They had met when his military unit had been stationed in Günzburg earlier in the war. In marrying Elfriede (1922–1980) he acquired two step children who were able to offload retrospectively the social and legal disadvantages of illegitimacy through their mother's marriage.

Remaining in Günzburg, between 1945 and 1961 Wagner worked as a school teacher and, later, as a school head at junior-middle schools built up by himself at the adjacent villages of Bubesheim and Reisensburg. In 1961 he then accepted an appointment as "rector“ of the catholic junior-middle boys‘ school in Günzburg: this was evidently not a full-time position.

== Politics ==
=== Local and regional politics ===
In 1946 Wagner became chairman of the Günzburg local CSU party. The CSU was a centre-right political party that saw itself as a successor to various political parties which through a combination of moderation and fragmentation had been swept away in 1933. In many ways the CSU was the Bavarian counterpart to the CDU operating in other parts of West Germany, and the two parties would generally find themselves in alliance in the national Bundestag, but the CSU was and is robustly independent of the CDU, especially in its dealings with the voters of Bavaria. It was Leo Wagner who had set up the Günzburg party branch, with the backing of the fiery Fritz Schäffer, a leading figure within the party across and beyond Bavaria. A series of local political appointments, sometimes complementary and sometimes overlapping, followed. In 1948 Wagner was appointed deputy "Landrat“. Between 1949 and 1964 he served as a member of the Günzburg municipal council. Between 1954 and 1962 he was also a member of the “Bezirkstag“ (Bayern), the directly elected district parliament for the administrative region of (Bavarian) Swabia. Within the "Bezirkstag“ he led the CSU group. In 1956 he embarked on an eight year period of service as junior mayor of Günzburg. Between 1961 and 1974 he chaired on the party's regional executive committee for Swabia.

=== National politics ===
==== Career progression ====
During the 1960s Leo Wagner emerged as a significant figure in national politics, following his election to the West German Bundestag (parliament). In the 1961 election the two main parties, the CDU and the SPD, received an almost identical level of support from voters: however, the CSU received almost 10% of the West German national vote from its Bavarian base, and a three party CDU/CSU/FDP coalition came together to back the continuation of a government dominated by the CDU under the leadership (as before) of Chancellor Adenauer, whose advancing age held out the promise, for ambitious leadership contenders of personnel changes at the top in the not too distant future. Leo Wagner secured a seat as a successful list candidate for Bavaria. He remained a Bundestag member till 1976, elected by party colleagues to serve no fewer than twelve years, between 1963 and 1975, as the parliamentary business manager for the CSU parliamentary group.

After the Spiegel affair in 1962 and the associated resignation of Franz Josef Strauß from his ministerial position, Wagner employed his considerable political skills of guile, charm and bulldozer-spirit behind the scenes to pave the path for his friend, the party leader, "back to the cabinet table" at the end of 1966.

In 1968 Wagner was the editor-compiler of a volume of the Bundestag speeches delivered by Franz Josef Strauß (who would continue in post as the CSU leader till his death in 1988). Between 1971 and 1975 Wagner was one of five Bundestag members listed as the (at that time) joint CDU/CSU parliamentary business managers. Between 1972 and 1975 his name was indeed the one at the top of this list, identifying him in the words of at least one commentator as the "primus inter pares“ among those named.

In 1965 Wagner was one of those parliamentarians who took a lead in setting up the German-(South) Korean parliamentary group. He followed through on this initiative in 1966 when he teamed up with Max Adenauer and the Bonn-based publisher Hermann Pfatteicher to found the “German-Korean Society“ of which he became president and, subsequently, honorary president.

In 1967 he became involved with Gunter Sachs and the "Flammenpfennig“ association which they founded together and which, along with other schemes, subsequently became known for selling commemorative gramophone records in order to generate money to support the recently launched organising committee for the 1972 Summer Olympics.

==== Nemesis ====
At home, all was not well. Leo Wagner was a popular councillor and, later, member of parliament with people who came to seek his advice. He received visitors in the large room on the first floor at the family home at Günzburg. Downstairs his wife and daughter became increasingly estranged from him. He was not much at home, but would appear for meals at which his demeanour was, at best, taciturn and distant. There were also ferocious arguments. The couple's child watched her mother change over time from a lively fun-loving woman into a depressive and then an alcoholic. Meanwhile, after becoming a Bundestag member, Wagner took an apartment at Bonn, the city far to the west in which the Bundestag was based at that time. Many Bundestag members did the same, and at least one Bonn apartment block had been set aside for the purpose. Wagner preferred to make his arrangements privately, however, and rented an apartment in the quarter surrounding the Hofgarten (park). Many, though not all, of those who knew him at the time were unwilling to talk about the deterioration in his condition even forty years later. According to one witness he seemed to be terrified to be alone. He frequently received visits from prostitutes at his apartment, and became a regular presence at several night clubs in the Bonn-Cologne area, spending implausibly large amounts of money on champagne. Among political colleagues he acquired a reputation as a formidable womanizer, though it is not clear how many people gained insights into any larger picture. By the time his grandson began to ask questions during the early decades of the twenty-first century, many of those who had known Leo Wagner were long dead, or for other reasons turned out to be out of reach. One who was still very much around forty years later was Theo Waigel, who had been a young Bundestag member during the 1970s (and who subsequently became a leading figure in the CSU). When Benedikt Schwarzer wrote to ask Waigel for help researching the documentary film he was making about his own grandfather's fall from grace, the reply was brief and, in its way, eloquent: “Because of my very negative experiences with Mr. Leo Wagner, I have no wish to become involved in a discussion about him“.

As the decade progressed, rumours about Wagner's increasingly deviant behaviour were circulated among the politicians in Bonn. Back at the family home in Günzburg there was little direct access to the Bonn rumour mill, but Wagner's increasingly desperate wife and his daughter were nevertheless beginning to join some of the dots. Elfriede Wagner took to telephoning her husband at his Bonn apartment in the evenings. When the call was answered by a woman whose voice she did not recognise she would put sown the telephone receiver at once. Alternatively, she would hold off doing this for long enough to yell “you whore” into the telephone mouthpiece first. An unavoidable breakthrough moment came in the Autumn/Fall of 1973 when the normally reliable monthly magazine “Capital“, a publication with a broadly-based focus on economics, at that time under the editorial direction of Ferdinand Simoneit, carried a series of articles under the headline "The strange affairs of the MP Leo W“. Much of what was written was couched in somewhat speculative terms. Nevertheless, the articles included what amounted to an allegation that Wagner has used his parliamentary status inappropriately in order to support attempts to borrow more money than he could afford to repay. It was said that Wagner had accumulated debts in excess of a million marks as a result of his life style and frequent night club visits. By 1975 Wagner's promissory notes were being declined by banks and his checks were bouncing. Whether Wagner's next move was driven by self-knowledge, advice from others concerned for his personal welfare, or simply – as an unsympathetic report stated at the time – an awareness that the press were closing in on him, on 29 January 1975 he applied for leave of absence from his public offices. A lawyer had already advised him to try and limit the risks that he faced by reporting himself to the authorities for credit fraud (‘‘‘Kreditbetrug‘‘‘). The lawyer then arranged his transfer, the next day, to Bonn's St.Elisabeth Krankenhaus (as the hospital was known at that time) and obtained from doctors a diagnosis for his client of what amounted to insanity. The press were informed that Wagner was at risk of committing suicide. He remained in hospital, undergoing treatment, for several months. While Wagner remained in the care of his doctors in Bonn, his wife in Bavaria, still living with their children, became ever more alcohol dependent, blaming herself for her husband's behaviour because she had “not been beautiful enough for him“. Her daily routine became unchanging. She would sit in front of the television watching one film after another with a bottle beside her. After dark she went upstairs without appearing to notice her children. From the bedroom came cries of "The whoremonger“, and "I don't want to live any more". For their part, the children tried to avoid their father becoming aware of the state of things at home, because they were terrified that he might turn up at the family home. On 20 February 1975 Leo Wagner submitted his resignation from the Bundestag in writing. It was initially rejected on the grounds that, following his diagnosis, he lacked the legal capacity to make such a move on his own behalf. On 26 February 1975, following the advice received the previous month from his lawyer, he reported himself to the authorities for credit fraud. Eye-watering reports as to the scale of his indebtedness appeared almost immediately in the media. In response to a request from a colleague parliamentarian that he should do so, during February 1975 he resigned from his position as parliamentary business manager: his successor in the post was another colleague, Paul Röhner.

==== Trial ====
Leo Wagner's trial for credit fraud took place in a criminal trial conducted at the Bonn district court at the end of 1980, between October and December. An expert witness had been called upon to testify on the period between October 1974 and January 1975. The expert had been invited not by the prosecutor's office but on behalf of the accused. The judge complained of inconsistencies in the documentation prepared for the trial. The issue arose of whether the accused could be held criminally responsible under Section 20 of the Criminal Code for debts incurred by him during that four month period, or whether, on account of his having been of unsound mind. In addition to incurring huge debts during the four month period, Wagner had managed mortgage his future earnings over a lengthy period as security. Even for the expert witness, the set of circumstances was a very unusual one, and he was evidently under some stress. Eventually he had to ask permission to sit down. He had suffered a stroke, and was taken away in an ambulance. As Wagner's trial progressed, there was much discussion over the timing of his mental breakdown, with defence lawyers insisting that it had been a gradual process, initially unrecognised despite reports of several bizarre outbursts at public events. In the end Wagner was convicted of credit fraud and issued with an eighteen month suspended sentence – equivalent to a conditional discharge subject to probation-based restrictions.

=== 1972 parliamentary vote of confidence ===
In April 1972 the Brandt government, which had operated with a wafer-thin (and for various disparate reasons shrinking) majority in the Bundestag since its election in 1969, faced a parliamentary vote of no confidence which it was expected to lose. It was known that Chancellor Brandt's so-called “Ostpolitik”, which involved mutual recognition between West and East Germany twenty years after the two provisional countries had come into existence de facto, was desperately unpopular with several members of his own SPD (party) and the leader of the CDU/CSU coalition in the Bundestag saw an opportunity to force a general election by defeating the government in a “constructive vote of no confidence”. Bundestag members from the CDU and CSU such as Leo Wagner were expected to vote in support of their party leaderships in order to ensure that the government fell. The government in Moscow was keen that the Brandt government should survive, however. There would be important financial opportunities arising from successful implementation of Brandt's “Ostpolitik”, if it would mean an end to East Germany's pariah status among western investors and the western governments setting the rules and assumptions under which capitalism operated across Europe. There was only limited trust between the government in Moscow and the governments of the various countries in Soviet-controlled central Europe, and most of the intelligence work undertaken on behalf of the Soviet “Eastern Bloc” in western Europe was undertaken and directed from Moscow. An exception arose in respect of East and West Germany because of a shared language and history (together with other points of cultural and familial reference) which made it far easier to recruit and conceal agents from one side of the “Iron Curtain” on the “other side”, if all the agents involved were mother-tongue German speakers. Intelligence work targeting West Germany was directed by ”Department HV A”, a large specialist sub-department of the East German Ministry for State Security (Stasi), functioning under the leadership (for more than 34 years) of the spy-chief Markus Wolf. When the West German government unexpectedly won their confidence vote by a margin of just 2 or 3 votes (sources differ), there were questions. Under the parliamentary procedure in place at the time, the confidence vote was conducted by secret ballot. The critical questions therefore went unanswered for several decades, but the rumours began to surface more quickly. In June 1973 a Bundestag member called Julius Steiner admitted in a press conference that he had abstained in the crucial vote because he supported the Brandt government policy on relations with East Germany. He had received 50,000 marks from a leading SPD member called Karl Wienand in return for his abstention. By the end of 1973 Julius Steiner had resigned his party membership. It emerged during 1973 that the West German intelligence services believed that Steiner had been acting as a paid informer for the East German intelligence services since at least as far back as 1972. However, the western agencies evidently had no wish to explain how they knew what they knew before a court, while Karl Wienand refused to discuss Steiner's assertions. The parliamentary committee of enquiry set up to investigate the matter in 1973 was therefore unable to reach any substantive conclusions. The widespread suspicions that the confidence vote had been won by the government because of bribes provided to opposition Bundestag members by the eastern intelligence services therefore remained, before 1990, matters for speculation both in the press and elsewhere. But they went unproven in public. Meanwhile, simple arithmetic indicated that Julius Steiner could not have been the only Bundestag member who had failed to vote with his party as expected.

=== Stasi connections ===
In March 1975 the news magazine Stern published a speculative allegation that Leo Wagner had, like Julius Steiner, accepted a bribe from the East German intelligence services, in return for which he had abstained in the 1972 parliamentary confidence vote against the Brandt government. This was apparently based on the disclosure at Wagner's credit fraud trial (which had concluded two months earlier) that in 1972 the accused had received a “loan of precisely 50,000 Marks from an unidentified source”. The evidence was powerful but it was circumstantial, and the mainstream press did not pursue the matter further at the time.

In November 2000 the respected news magazine Der Spiegel revived the hitherto speculative reports that Wagner had been the second Bundestag member, along with Julius Steiner, who had abstained in the 1972 confidence vote against the Brandt government. Reunification in 1990 had provided access to a vast collection of Stasi reports from the East German years. At the time of the changes that preceding reunification, Stasi officers had raced to destroy the files in the various State Security offices round the country, so there never would nor could be a complete Stasi archive surviving. Nevertheless, the Stasi Records Agency, set up in 1991, became a rich source of information for journalists, historians, other researchers and members of the public wishing to know what information the East German authorities had held on them and – often more painfully – who had provided it. It took many years for all the files to be gathered together, archived and indexed, but by the time of the Spiegel report in 2000 a large amount of material had become accessible. The authors of the Spiegel article had clearly accessed Stasi records; but the information on Wagner's role back in 1972 was now corroborated from elsewhere. In 1993 the former East German spy-chief Markus Wolf had revealed that the Stasi had „purchased“ the vote of Bundestag member Julius Steiner for the 1972 confidence vote. Another former Stasi officer had confided separately to an investigator that the vote of a second CDU/CSU had been "cast according to Stasi instructions". This vote like Steiner's, had been purchased for 50,000 marks, albeit via an intermediary. The Stasi man had approached a western journalist, identified as „Georg F“ (Georg Fleissmann). The journalist was known at the time to have close connections to the CSU (party). It quickly became apparent from follow-up investigations that the journalist Georg F. had been a long-standing “Unofficial collaborator“ (IM / paid informant) for the Stasi when he made his approach to Wagner. He is identified in Stasi files by the code name “IM Dürer“ and he appears, from surviving records to have been active as a Stasi informant between 1966 and 1985. It is not known how much information the Stasi already held from their own sources about Wagner's financial situation, nor how much the informant-journalist Georg F might have picked up from his contacts with party leaders and officers, but the growing disparity between Wagner's life-style choices and the salary amount for a Bundestag member was presumably already apparent to any investigator looking in the right places. Wagner looked like a good prospect for a bribe, and when approached with an offer he accepted it. Georg F. alias “IM Dürer“ had been sentenced in 1995 to a 21 month suspended prison sentence for his espionage work against West Germany on behalf of East German intelligence, so the trial records will have provided the journalists writing in 2000 with usable well-tested evidence as to his activities, even though he was no longer available for interviews, having died between 1995 and 2000. Wagner, his public career by this time long behind him, continued to deny the allegations, but this did not dissuade Spiegel from publishing their report.

Meanwhile investigations at the Stasi Records Agency continued. In 1998 the existence of a large and important Stasi ”Department HV A” file, identified subsequently as the “Sira databank“ was discovered. It later turned out that the file included thirty entries on respect of an informant identified as “IM Löwe“ (or, less memorably, by the registration reference number XV/6985/75). Several of the entries hinted at the identity of “IM Löwe“ as being that of Leo Wagner, though apparent gaps in the surviving records meant it was never clear if he had already been on the Stasi payroll as far back as 1972. In March 1983 “IM Löwe“ had provided valued information on the future intentions of the CSU party leadership following that month's Bundestag elections. Nevertheless, the West German prosecutors‘ office found it necessary to turn to the US intelligence services (CIA) for confirmation of their suspicions about “IM Löwe“. Relations between the intelligence services of the United States and West Germany remained famously frosty, due in part to a well-grounded perception on the part of CIA operatives that West German intelligence had been desperately leaky. The Americans had nevertheless recently acquired a file presumed reliable in which the real names of all the ”Department HV A” spies were shown. The circumstances under which the Americans acquired the so-called Rosenholz files were never clear, but one by one the data were copied on to CDs and the CDs were passed across to the German authorities. The Americans initially guarded the Rosenholz files jealously, but by 2003 German investigators had a complete set (passed across on 381 CDs) and the data were made available more to scholars more generally. As a result of these developments, confirmation appeared in the public domain during the early years of the twenty-first century that Wagner had indeed been the other Bundestag member who had accepted a bribe from East German agents to vote against his own party and in support of the Brandt government in the 1972 parliamentary confidence vote. It also emerged in 1995 that the KGB had intervened directly in 1972, offering Egon Bahr of the ruling SPD 1,000,000 marks with which to bribe CDU/CSU Bundestag members to abstain in the crucial confidence vote: Bahr had turned the offer down. At the same time as the information about Wagner's role in the confidence vote made a return to the pages of the political press, his work for the Stasi as Informant “IM Löwe“ also became public.

Because of statutory limitation periods, Wagner's risk from criminal prosecution in connection with espionage allegations had by this time become vanishingly remote. However, he resolutely still denied ever having had contacts with the East German security services: ”That is false and made up“. He nevertheless admitted that he had known the journalist Georg Fleissmann (“IM Dürer“) since the 1960s, albeit without ever having been aware, he insisted, of Fleissmann's connections to East Germany.

== Personal life ==
Leo Wagner married twice.

His first marriage, to Elfriede Wagner, took place towards the end of the war, probably in 1944. Since his wife already had two children from earlier relationships he acquired a ready-made family. The couple were reportedly keen to have children together, but it was not till they had been married for eight years that their son was born. The marriage was widely reported, in retrospect, to have been an unhappy one due to Leo Wagner's lifestyle choices which included frequent philandering. Elfriede developed an acute alcohol dependency and died painfully from cancer in 1980.

Leo Wagner's second marriage was to Brigitte Wagner.

== Recognition ==
- 1968: Bavarian Order of Merit
- 1969: Cross of Merit: Class 1
- 1973: Commander's Cross
- 1973: Honorary Doctorate from Sungkyunkwan University

== Film ==
In the 2018 documentary film „Die Geheimnisse des schönen Leo “ ("The secrets of beautiful Leo") Wagner's grandson Benedikt Schwarzer, who is also a graduate of the Munich Television and Film Academy, traces the life story of Leo Wagner. The film had its premier for critics at the Munich International Documentary Film Festival.
