= Elimar Freiherr von Fürstenberg =

German politician (1910–1981)

Member of the Bundestag; for Landshut
- In office 7 September 1949 – 6 October 1953
- Preceded by: Constituency established
- Succeeded by: Hans Schuberth

Personal details
- Born: 27 May 1910 Istanbul, Ottoman Empire
- Died: 10 July 1981 (aged 71) Wesseling, West Germany
- Party: Christian Social Union (after 1951)
- Other political affiliations: Bavaria Party (before 1951)

Elimar Fürstenberg (27 May 1910 – 10 July 1981) was a German politician of the Christian Social Union in Bavaria (CSU) and former member of the German Bundestag.

== Political career ==
In the 1949 federal elections he was elected directly to the German Bundestag for the Bavarian Party in the Landshut constituency with 32.9% of the vote, and remained a member of the Bundestag until 1953. On 19 January 1951 he joined the CSU.
