= Theo Waigel =

German politician (born 1939)

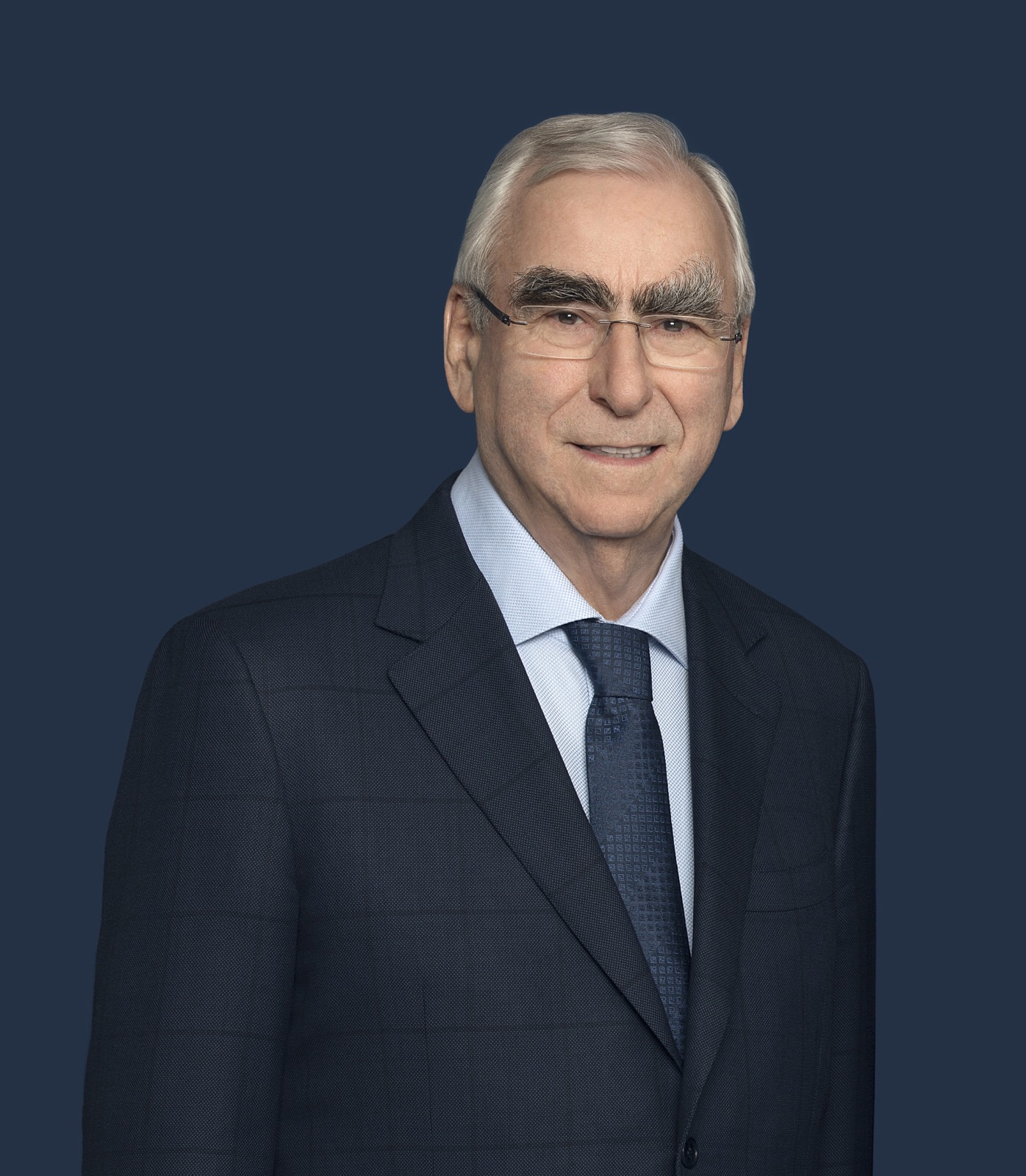
- Waigel in 2019

Leader of the Christian Social Union
- In office 16 November 1988 – 16 January 1999
- Preceded by: Franz Josef Strauss
- Succeeded by: Edmund Stoiber

Minister of Finance
- In office 21 April 1989 – 27 October 1998
- Chancellor: Helmut Kohl
- Preceded by: Gerhard Stoltenberg
- Succeeded by: Oskar Lafontaine

Bundestag First Deputy Leader of the CDU/CSU Group
- In office 4 November 1982 – 16 November 1988
- Leader: Alfred Dregger; Wolfgang Schäuble
- Preceded by: Friedrich Zimmermann
- Succeeded by: Wolfgang Bötsch

Member of the Bundestag; for Neu-Ulm
- In office 14 December 1976 – 17 October 2002
- Preceded by: Leo Wagner
- Succeeded by: Georg Nüßlein

Personal details
- Born: Theodor Waigel; 22 April 1939 (age 87) Ursberg, Germany
- Party: Christian Social Union
- Spouse(s): Karin Waigel (m. 1966; div. 1993) Irene Epple (m. 1994)
- Children: 3
- Relatives: Maria Epple (sister-in-law)
- Education: University of Würzburg
- Profession: Lawyer

Theodor Waigel (born 22 April 1939) is a German politician of the Christian Social Union in Bavaria (CSU). He represented Neu-Ulm in the Bundestag from 1976 to 2002.

Waigel is a lawyer, and earned a doctorate in 1967. He was a member of the Bundestag from 1972 to 2002. He served as Federal Minister of Finance of Germany in the Cabinet of Chancellor Helmut Kohl from 1989 to 1998, and as Chairman of the Christian Social Union in Bavaria from 1988 to 1999. He is known as the father of the Euro, the European currency. He played a vital role in its introduction as German Minister of Finance. He also managed to impose an austerity program on West Germans and overcome the massive deficits of German unification to meet the strict fiscal benchmarks mandated by Europe's single currency. In 2009, he was appointed Honorary Chairman of the CSU.

== Early life ==
Waigel was born in Ursberg to a farming family originally from the Swabian village of Oberrohr. When he was six years old, his older brother, August, was killed in France during World War II.

== Member of the Bundestag (1972–2002) ==
Waigel first became a Member of the German Bundestag for Neu-Ulm in the 1972 federal elections. From 1980 to 1982, he served as spokesperson of the CDU/CSU parliamentary group on economic affairs. He was the group's deputy chairman from 1982 until 1989. In this capacity, he also served as the leader of the Bundestag group of CSU parliamentarians.

== Federal Minister of Finance (1989–1998) ==
In a 1989 cabinet reshuffle, Chancellor Helmut Kohl named Waigel as new Federal Minister of Finance, replacing Gerhard Stoltenberg. During his time in office, his state secretaries included leading economists Horst Köhler (1990–1993) and Jürgen Stark (1995–1998), among others.

=== German reunification ===
During his time in office, Waigel oversaw the early economic integration of East Germany after the fall of Communism. He not only had to impose enormous new taxes on the German public, but he also had to keep the country's budget deficit from ballooning while Germany was spending $150 billion a year to rebuild the east.

In March 1990, Waigel publicly announced that the government was considering a proposal by its central bank, the Bundesbank, for conversion at a rate of one Deutsche mark to every two East marks, with an exception for a small portion of personal savings. In response, hundreds of thousands of East Germans protested against the plan, including about 10,000 in East Berlin, who took to the Palace of the Republic, where the newly elected Parliament was holding its inaugural meeting. Chancellor Helmut Kohl said that was not the policy after all.

On 19 May 1990, Waigel and his East German counterpart Walter Romberg signed a state treaty to merge their economies and make the West German mark the sole legal currency in both nations by 2 July 1990.

In July 1990, Waigel joined Kohl and Foreign Minister Hans-Dietrich Genscher on a trip to Moscow to meet President Mikhail S. Gorbachev, where they worked to convince the Soviet leader to drop his remaining objections to German unification within NATO.

On 9 August 1990, Waigel announced that West Germany's 1990 budget would be its last and that he was withdrawing the Cabinet draft for the 1991 budget to make way for an all-German budget consonant with unification. Later that year, he said that borrowing by government, state and local authorities would total up to $95 billion the following year, nearly five times the equivalent figure for West Germany in 1989. Between 1989 and 1991 alone, the central government's budget deficit soared from 0.5 percent of national income to 5 percent.

Following a proposal developed by Waigel, the Kohl government agreed in February 1991 to an unexpectedly large package of tax increases – including a 7.5 percent surcharge on personal income and corporate tax payments – to help pay for reunification, as well as the government's contribution to the allied forces during the Gulf War and aid to Eastern Europe's fledgling democracies. In March 1992, Germany paid its final installment of $1.68 billion in Gulf War aid to the United States, fulfilling its overall pledge of $5.5 billion.

In the national debate on whether the federal government should remain in Bonn or move to Berlin, Waigel argued that Germany had assumed enough major financial obligations over the preceding years and could not afford to build a new capital.

In early 1996, Waigel and his French counterpart Jean Arthuis launched a French-German economic stimulus package aimed at encouraging spending, increasing growth, cutting taxes on business and reducing unemployment. In the subsequent years, however, both CDU and CSU favored increasing taxes, fearing the consequences of further budgetary cuts; by 1997, the government was already in danger of breaking a Constitutional Court ruling that spending on public investment must exceed the budget deficit. At the time, Germany had a record 2.2 trillion marks in public debt, much of it amassed during Waigel's tenure because of the costs of reunification.

During the period of Reunification in the 1990s, Waigel, as Minister of Finance, refused to return eight buildings in East Germany belonging to six Austrian Jewish citizens.

=== International economic policies ===
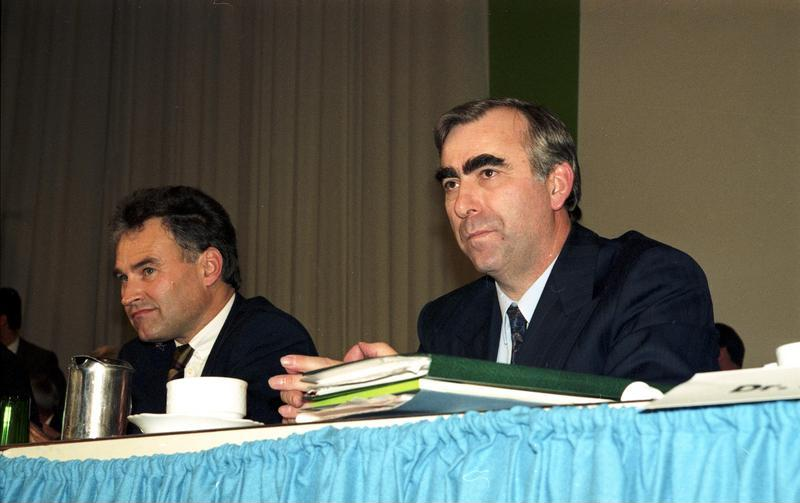
Waigel (right) with Erwin Huber in 1989

Soon after taking office, Waigel negotiated with his counterparts of the G7 on the difficult question of rankings in the voting hierarchy of the International Monetary Fund (IMF). Under the agreement, Japan and West Germany shared the No. 2 ranking at the agency, ahead of France and the United Kingdom. By 1991, Waigel was the driving force within the G7 to agree in principle that the Soviet Union should be offered a role in the IMF. In 1991, he became the first chairman of the board of the newly established European Bank for Reconstruction and Development (EBRD).

=== Energy and climate policy ===
At Waigel's urging, the Bundestag established the German Federal Environmental Foundation (DBU) in 1990, using the amount of €1.3 billion from privatizing the former steel group Salzgitter AG.

After Germany and France failed to get the 18th G7 summit to agree on ways to assure the safety of deteriorating nuclear power plants in Eastern Europe and the former Soviet Union, Waigel pledged that public funds from the West would nonetheless be mobilized not simply to repair dangerous plants but "to change the whole energy policy in these states so they can conserve energy, develop alternative energy sources and thereby create more leeway for shutting down plants that are unsafe."

=== Introduction of the Euro ===
Under the leadership of Kohl and Waigel, the adoption of a common currency became central to Germany's goals of political and economic integration in Europe.

At the height of speculative attacks on the European Exchange Rate Mechanism (ERM) in 1992–93, acting closely with his then counterpart Michel Sapin of France, Waigel repulsed speculators trying to break the French franc's parity with the Deutsche Mark by selling marks en masse until the bank traders gave up.

Throughout the 1990s, Waigel was seeking to assure a skeptical German public as well as small companies and banks that the new currency would be as stable as the Deutsche Mark, which had become a symbol of Germany's economic hegemony in Europe at the time. In September 1995, Waigel first proposed that countries adopting a single currency agree to reinforce rules on budget deficits and impose financial sanctions against deficit violators that go beyond the penalties included in the Maastricht Treaty. Also in September 1995, Waigel first floated Euro as the name of the new single currency. He later overruled the French government with his proposal; France had favored want the name ECU, the European Currency Unit which was used in many accounts and the issuance of some debt at the time. The name "Euro" was later chosen for the new currency at the European Council in Madrid.

In a move to reduce government spending, Waigel led the call for a reduction in Germany's contributions to the budget of the European Union in 1996. He wrote to Kohl pointing out that contributions from Germany made up about 60 percent of the EU's regional and structural funds and urging him to push for a cut in Germany's burden. In 1998, he joined fellow finance ministers Gerrit Zalm of the Netherlands, Rudolf Edlinger of Austria and Erik Åsbrink of Sweden urging President of the European Commission Jacques Santer to cap the proportion of a country's income which goes to the EU as part of his Agenda 2000 spending review.

After his failed attempt to pressure Bundesbank president Hans Tietmeyer into a quick revaluation of the country's gold reserves in order to bring Germany's budget deficit into line with the criteria for the single currency, Waigel had to confront a parliamentary motion against him on 4 June 1997. He won the vote by just 328 votes to 311.

In November 1997, Waigel imposed the strictest budget freeze in the country's history, in a last-ditch effort to fulfill the Euro convergence criteria. The freeze, which lasted until the end of that year, was imposed to save the government a further one billion marks ($578.2 million).

On 30 June 1998, Waigel attended the inauguration ceremony of the European Central Bank in Frankfurt, Germany, alongside Kohl, ECB President Wim Duisenberg, President of the European Commission Jacques Santer, President of the European Parliament José María Gil-Robles, British Prime Minister Tony Blair, and Chancellor of Austria Viktor Klima.

In 2011, a commentator seeing Germany forced perhaps to choose between monetary stability, on the one hand, and the EMU, recalled by way of contrast Waigel's statement at the founding, "We are bringing the D-Mark into Europe."

=== Role in Bavarian politics ===
In May 1993, Waigel announced that we would leave national politics and run for the state premiership of Bavaria against his rival, Edmund Stoiber. During what turned into a bitter struggle, it was revealed that he was estranged from his wife and had been in a long-standing relationship with former Olympic skier Irene Epple. In the end, he failed to win the premiership but stayed on as party leader. In late 1995, Waigel was re-elected to the CSU leadership with 95 percent of the vote.

Following the 1998 elections, Waigel was succeeded by Oskar Lafontaine. At the time, he was Germany's longest-serving postwar Finance Minister.

By the end of the 1990s, Waigel and Minister-President Stoiber of Bavaria were locked in a bitter rivalry for control of the state and its ruling party, the CSU. Stoiber had been a vociferous critic of the creation of a single European currency and he has also infuriated both Kohl and Waigel by proposing that wealthy states like Bavaria be freed from having to underwrite social security costs for poorer states. In late 1998, Stoiber succeeded Waigel as chairman of the CSU.

== Life after politics ==
Since his retirement from German and European politics, Waigel has held paid and unpaid positions, including:

- Liechtenstein, Honorary Consul
- AachenMünchener Lebensversicherung AG, Member of the Supervisory Board
- Accor, Member of the Board of Directors
- Alcatel, Member of the Advisory Board
- Bayerische Gewerbebau AG, Deputy Chairman of the Supervisory Board
- Bayerische HypoVereinsbank, Member of the European Advisory Board
- Deutsche Vermögensberatung (DVAG), Chairman of the Advisory Board
- Eli Lilly Holdings Ltd., Member of the European Advisory Board
- Emerson Electric, Member of the European Advisory Board
- EnBW, Member of the Advisory Board
- Fendt, Member of the Supervisory Board (since 2007)
- Swissair, Member of the Advisory Board
- Munich Documentation Centre for the History of National Socialism, Co-Chairman of the Board of Trustees (alongside Hans-Jochen Vogel)
- University of Augsburg, Chairman of the Board of Trustees
- Institute for Bavarian History at LMU Munich, Member of the Board of Trustees
- Institute of the Regions of Europe, Member of the Board of Patrons
- Kissinger Sommer, Member of the Board of Trustees
- Eugen Biser Foundation, Member of the Board of Trustees
- Hanns Seidel Foundation, Member of the Board of Executives
- German Council on Foreign Relations (DGAP), Member of the Board of Executives

After serving as Of counsel with the Munich office of law firm GSK Stockmann + Kollegen for many years, Waigel – alongside Alexander Radwan, among others – joined Waigel Rechtsanwälte in 2016.

In 2008, following revelations about violations of the Foreign Corrupt Practices Act, the German industrial conglomerate Siemens agreed to install Waigel as an outside corporate monitor for four years. Waigel was the first compliance monitor who is not a U.S. national. He served in this position between January 2009 and October 2012.

In 2011, Waigel served as a member of the Board of Trustees of the Munich bid for the 2018 Winter Olympics.

In 2012, Waigel joined a newly established external advisory panel under the leadership of Jürgen Hambrecht at Deutsche Bank, which was to review compensation and governance at the company.

Even after the end of his political career, Waigel was a CSU delegate to the Federal Convention for the purpose of electing the President of Germany in 2009, 2010, 2017 and 2022.

In 2013, Waigel was offered the role of president of TSV 1860 Munich but decided against it. Amid the 2015 FIFA corruption case, he declined offers to join an advisory board to the 2016 FIFA Reform Committee.

From 2016 to 2022, following an appointment by Chancellor Angela Merkel, Waigel served on a three-member panel (alongside Michael Gerhardt and Krista Sager) to oversee the implementation of a new law designed to avoid potential conflicts of interest, requiring senior German officials from the chancellor to deputy ministers to observe a cooling-off period if they want to quit the government for a job in business.

Alongside David Gold, Baron Gold and Noëlle Lenoir, Waigel was appointed by Airbus to an Independent Compliance Review Panel (ICRP) in 2017, amid investigations by the Serious Fraud Office (SFO) and the French National Financial Prosecutor (PNF) into allegations of fraud, bribery and corruption in the company's civil aviation business. In 2021, he was appointed to co-chair – alongside Brigitte Zypries – an independent expert commission established by audit firm Ernst & Young to assess its involvement in the Wirecard scandal.

== Personal life ==
From 1966 to 1993 Waigel was married to Karin Waigel (two children). Since 1994 he has been married to the Olympic alpine skier Irene Epple; they have one child. Waigel is a Roman Catholic.
