= Institute of the Regions of Europe =

Scientific institute in Salzburg, Austria

Institute of the Regions of Europe Institut der Regionen Europas
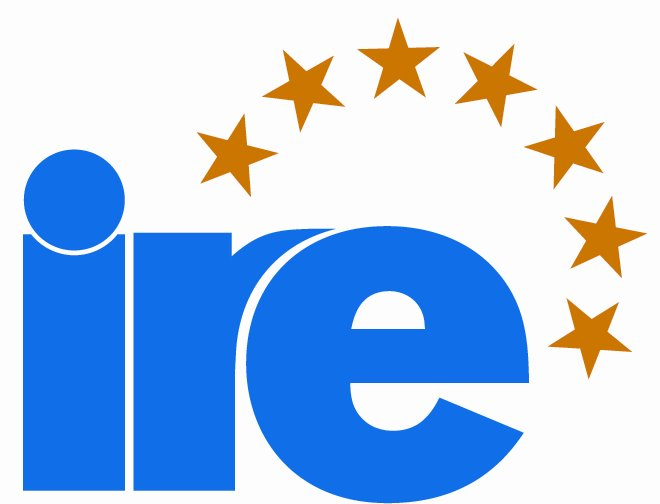
- The logo of IRE
- Abbreviation: IRE
- Formation: 2004-12-21
- Headquarters: Salzburg, Austria
- Location: Nonntaler Hauptstrasse 58
- Management: Chairman of the Board: Franz Schausberger Deputy Chairman of the Board: Stefan Eder Member of the Board: Helmut Falschlehner
- Staff: General Secretary: Joachim Fritz European Committee of the Regions, EU policy, Western Balkans, Sotschi Dialogue, Ukraine: Stefan Haböck Office management, conference organisation and regional activities: Nataša Milenković
- Website: www.institut-ire.eu

The Institute of the Regions of Europe (IRE) (German: Institut der Regionen Europas; IRE) is a scientific institute located in Salzburg (Austria) and was founded on 21 December 2004 by Univ. Prof. Dr. Franz Schausberger, former governour of the Land Salzburg. The Institute is part of the Institute of European Regions (non-profit) private foundation, which was founded in autumn 2004.

== Purpose ==
The main aim of the foundation was to create a supranational and non - partisan body, which in an enlarged Europe is dedicated to taking into account the increasing importance of regions, municipalities and enterprises. Also on the basis of the Lisbon treaty, the IRE is committed to reduce existing information deficits, to tackle problems and to try to exploit the various economic potentials of regional as well as trans-regional cooperation between the regions of Europe.

An important focus here is the creation of networks between regions, municipalities and other areas of public actions as well as their economics for the realization of their interests. This applies in particular to the new EU member states as well as to the candidates for accession to the next recording session, or to those countries which are seeking this status.

With its priorities and initiatives, the IRE supports decentralisation and regionalisation and provides expertise for strengthening respective processes. A small but competent team based in Salzburg offers consulting for many of these regions, municipalities, enterprises and institutions.

With its impartial and non-profit character the IRE wishes to minimize informational deficits and to foster the economic potentials in the European regions. Cross-border cooperation is upheld as a fundamental instrument for supporting social cohesion and sustainable economic development. As a supporter of the European integration process the institute is obliged to the European principles of democracy, tolerance, international understanding and subsidiarity. The institute is financed by founders, membership fees and sponsoring. It has its seat in Salzburg, Austria and disposes of an administrative infrastructure in Vienna as well.

== Members ==
Up to more than 130 member regions, municipalities, cities and towns as well as enterprises from 23 European countries have joined the IRE network. The members and supporters of the Institute of the Regions of Europe (IRE) are on the one hand regions, cities and municipalities of Europe and, on the other hand, important economic enterprises. Other members are partners of the Institute through the Association for the promotion of the Institute of the Regions of Europe (IRE).

== Activities ==
On behalf of the Austrian Presidency of the Council of the European Union the IRE has started a series of Café d’Europe on Europe Day, 9 May 2006, in all EU-capitals. The main aim of these events was to use the relaxed atmosphere of a traditional coffee house, in order to discuss EU topics such as integration process and participation of civil society in decision making. Under the title "Café d'Europe Régional" the institute continued to organize this form of events in various European cities. Top-class referents from the areas of politics, diplomacy and economy as well as an interested audience are invited to discuss.

The annual Conference of European Regions and Cities will be organized on current topical issues for Europe's regions and cities with regard to future strategies and challenges for politics and businesses. Each year, this conference brings together about 300 political and economic representatives from different regions of Europe.

Moreover, Expert Conferences are continuously organised on specific topics of regional politics.

== Research ==
Scientific research at the IRE focuses on regional and local election research, regionalization and decentralization in Europe, and regional and local history.

Published four times per year, the magazine "Newsregion" informs more than 2,000 decision makers in Europe about the activities of the IRE.

The IRE monograph series consists of research papers on the topics of regional and local election analysis, political systems, regional location development, EU regional policy and other areas focusing on regionalisation and decentralisation. A selection of papers as well as other publications is published annually in the "Yearbook of Regionalism".

== Internship programme ==
To young people the IRE offers a possibility for an internship at the IRE office in Salzburg. Therefore, the IRE is in cooperation with various universities and institutes all over Europe. By now, over 200 students from all kind of academic fields and various European countries worked on a research paper on a topic related to European or regional policy. The results are published within the frame of the IRE monograph series.

== Economic Board ==
- Hermann Anderl - Managing Director, Canon CEE GmbH
- Wolfgang Anzengruber - Chairman of the Board, Verbund AG
- Stefan Dörfler - Chairman of the Board, Erste Bank der österreichischen Sparkassen AG
- Peter Haubner - General Secretary, Österreichischer Wirtschaftsbund
- Andreas Hopf - Managing Director, Central Danube Region Marketing & Development
- Johannes Hörl - Managing Director & Chairman of the Board, Großglockner Hochalpenstrasse
- Franz Hrachowitz - Managing Director, TRASYS Beteiligungs- und Management GmbH
- Đorđa Kojić - Chairman of the Executive Board, Brčko Gas d.o.o.
- Klaus Mangold - Chairman, Mangold Consulting GmbH
- Susanne Riess - Chairwoman of the Board, Bausparkasse Wüstenrot AG
- Veronika Seitweger - Auditor, Tax Advisor & Partner, TPA Steuerberatung GmbH
- Alois Steinbichler - Chairman of the Executive Board, Kommunalkredit Austria AG
- Werner Steinecker - Chairman of the Board, Energie AG Oberösterreich
- Markus Strasser-Stöckl - CEO & General Manager, Network Quality Management GmbH
- Christian Struber - Managing Director, Salzburg Wohnbau GmbH
- Josef Taus - Chairman of the Board, Management Trust Holding AG
- Zvjezdan Višt - Founder & Managing Director, Wischt d.o.o.
- Kurt Weinberger - Chairman of the Board, Österreichische Hagelversicherung
- Walter Zandanell - Managing Director & Chairman of the Board, Volksbank Salzburg

== Board of Patrons ==
The activities of the IRE are in line with the idea of the "Europe of the Regions" on the basis of the principle of subsidiarity, which is one of the pillars of the European Union. The members of the Board of Patrons support the objectives of the Institute of the Regions of Europe (IRE).

- Benjamin R. Barber † - Political scientist, political theorist
- Jerzy Buzek − Member of the European Parliament, former President of the EP and former Prime-Minister of Poland
- Luis Durnwalder − Former Governour of South Tyrol
- Benita Ferrero-Waldner – EU-Commissioner for External Relations and European Neighbourhood Policy (2004–2010)
- Hubert von Goisern – Songwriter and world musician
- Johannes Hahn – European Commissioner for Regional Policy
- Ivo Josipović – President of Croatia
- Jean-Claude Juncker – former Prime Minister of Luxembourg, President of the Euro Group (2005–2013) and President of the European Union
- Helmut Kohl – Federal Chancellor, Germany (1982–1998)
- Borut Pahor − President of Slovenia and former Prime Minister of Slovenia
- Erwin Pröll − Former Governour of Lower Austria
- Viviane Reding − Member of the European Parliament
- Wolfgang Schüssel – Federal Chancellor, Austria (2000–2007)
- Karel Schwarzenberg – Minister of Foreign Affairs, Czech Republic (2007–09 & 2010–13)
- Edmund Stoiber – Minister-president of the state of Bavaria (1993–2007)
- Danilo Türk − Former President of Slovenia
- Theo Waigel – Federal Minister for Finance, Germany (1989–1998)
- Kandeh Yumkella − Agriculture Economist and former Director-General of UNIDO
- Helmut Zilk † – Mayor of Vienna (1984–1994)
