= Thomas Gambke =

German manager and politician

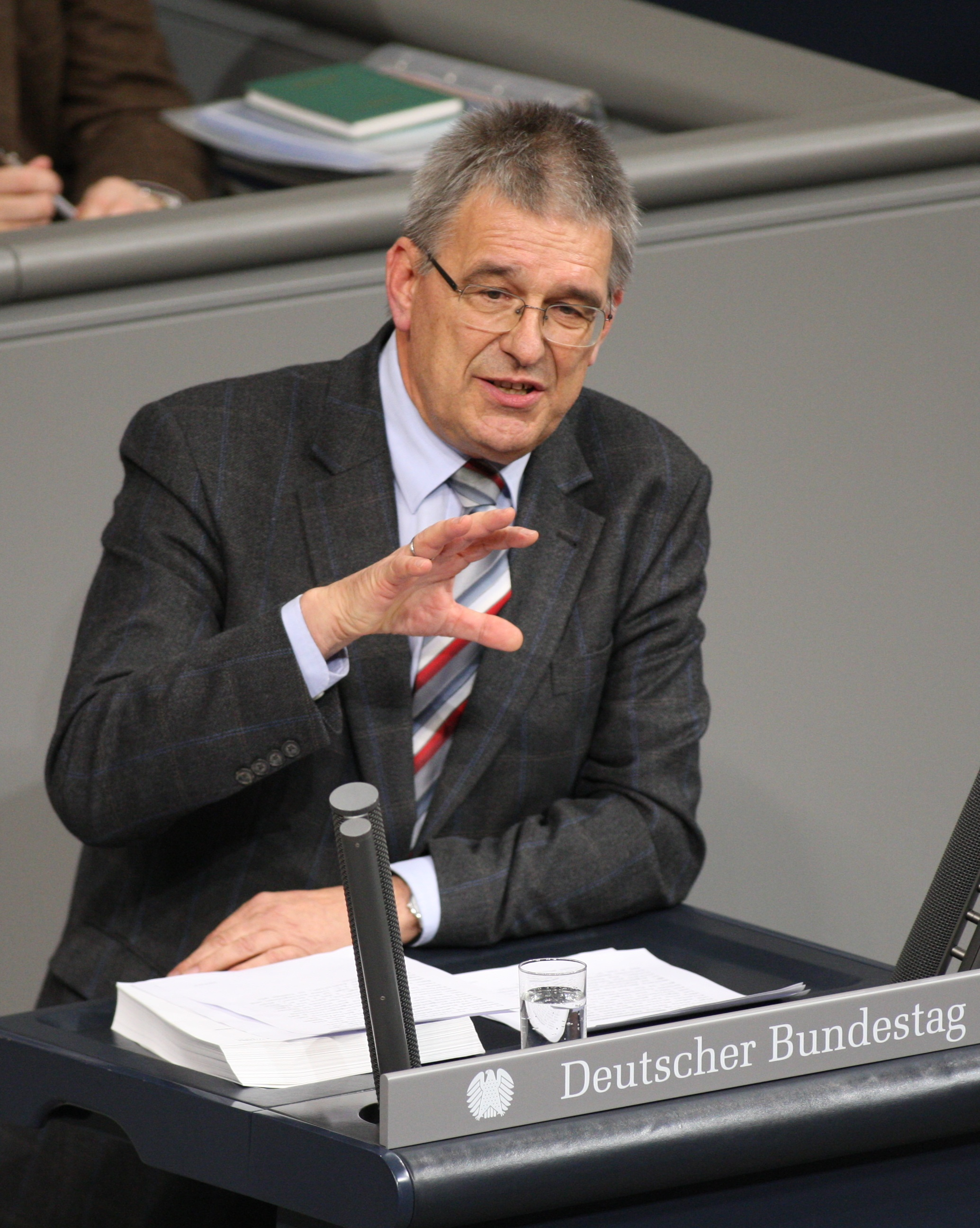
Gambke holding a speech in 2013

Thomas Gambke is a retired German politician of the Alliance 90/The Greens, who was a member of the Bundestag from 2005 to 2017, effectively winning a seat in the 15th, 16th and 17th election. A diploma physician, Gambke worked for the Schott AG and later as an independent entrepreneur, prior to entering politics.

== Early life and career ==
Gambke was born on October 16, 1949 in Rimsting, at the Lake Chiemsee in Upper Bavaria. He visited a Volksschule in Mehlem (Bonn) and went to Gymnasium in Bad Godesberg (Bonn) and Gehrden. After graduating in 1968 and completing Basic military service, Gambke studied physics at the Technische Universität Darmstadt where he got his diploma in 1976, followed by a doctorate in 1981.

He worked as a research assistant at the Institut für Festkörperphysik (Institute for Solid State Physics) at the Technische Universität Darmstadt and did scientific work at the University of California, San Diego, From 1982, he was as a technology consultant at the VDI Technology Center in Berlin.

Gambke joined Schott AG in 1984 where he first worked as a project manager in the Research & Development department. He became that department's head in 1985 and did research at the Otto Schott Research Center in Mainz. In 1990, Gambke took over the commercial management of the Schott plant in Landshut. He contributed to the creation of production facilities in Czechia (1992), Singapore (1994) and in the USA (2001).

Towards the end of his time at Schott, he held high positions in Schott: He was the head of Schott's Packaging Department and the vice-president of the newly founded NEC SCHOTT Components Corporation. Last he was the Spokesman of the Executive Board of SCHOTT Electronics GmbH from 2003 to 2006.

Gambke left Schott in 2007 and founded Bürgerenergie Isae e.G. in 2012, an organization focussing on Energy transition. He was a member of the board of trustees of the University of Applied Sciences Landshut and a member of the Petra Kelly Foundation, named after one of the founders of the Green Party.

== Political Work ==
Gambke joined the Alliance 90/The Greens in 2004 and was the spokesman of the party's local chapter in the Landshut District from 2006 to 2010. He was a member of the city Council of Landshut from 2008 to 2011. During that time, he was first elected into the Bundestag (in 2009). There, he was a member of the Finance Committee, the Committee for Economy and Energy and was the chairman of the Parliamentary group organizing cooperation with ASEAN countries.

== Private Life ==
Gambke is married and has three children. He lives in Landshut. According to himself, his biggest political idol is Ernst Reuter of the SPD, the first mayor of Berlin after WWII.
