= Gerd Mannes =

German politician (born 1969)

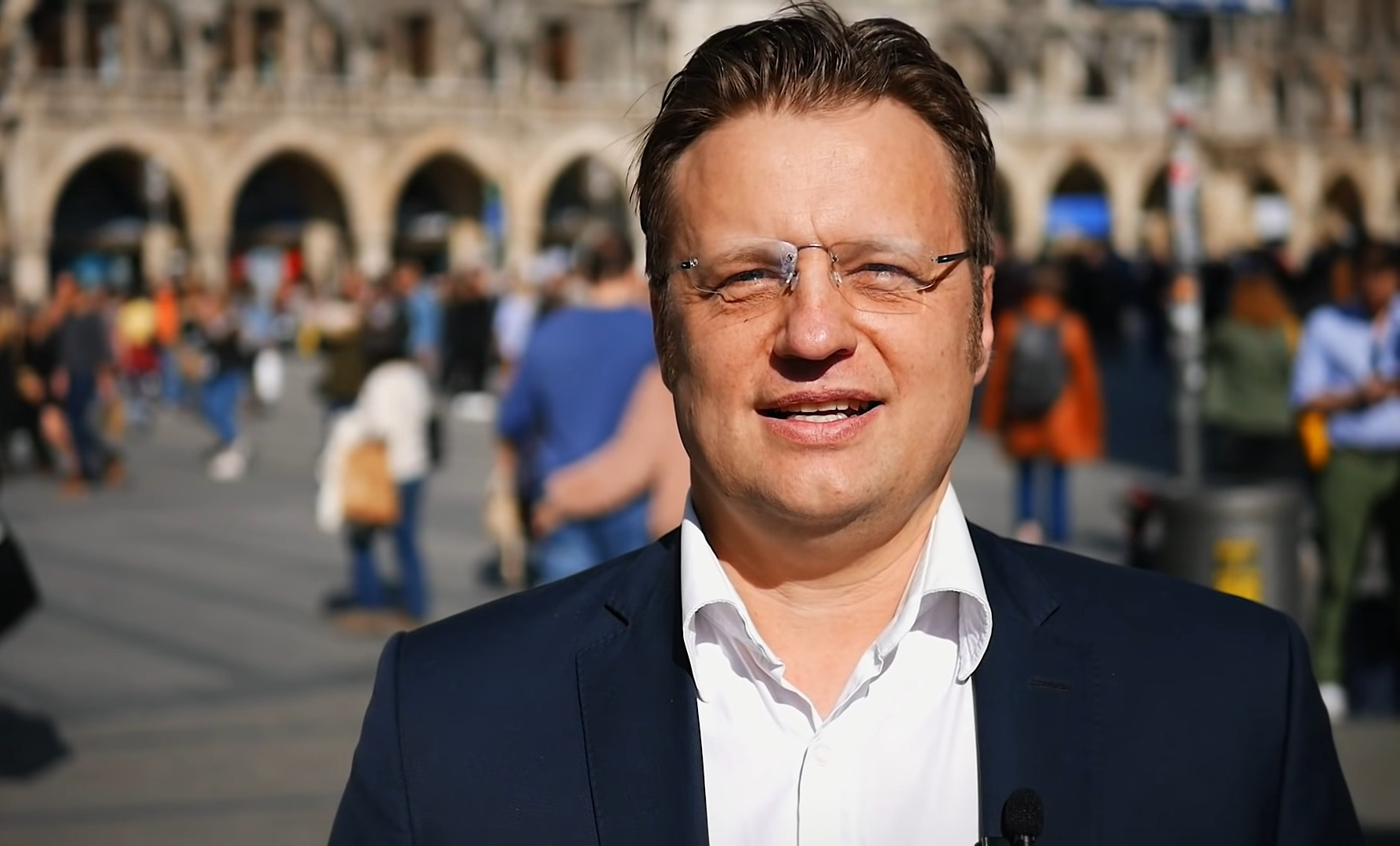
- Mannes in 2019

Member of the Landtag of Bavaria
- Incumbent
- Assumed office 5 November 2018
- Constituency: Swabia

Personal details
- Born: 21 March 1969 (age 57) Leipheim
- Party: Alternative for Germany

Gerd Mannes (born 21 March 1969 in Leipheim) is a German politician serving as a member of the Landtag of Bavaria since 2018. He is the group leader of the Alternative for Germany in the district council of Günzburg.
