= List of German economics ministers =

This is a List of Economics Ministers of Germany from 1919 to the present.

== Weimar Republic, 1919–1933 ==
Political Party: SPD DDP DVP Independent

No.	Portrait	Minister of Economics	Took office	Left office	Time in office	Party
1	Rudolf Wissell	Rudolf Wissell (1869–1962)	13 February 1919	15 July 1919	152 days	SPD
2	Robert Schmidt	Robert Schmidt (1864–1943)	16 July 1919	24 June 1920	344 days	SPD
3	Ernst Scholz	Ernst Scholz (1874–1932)	25 June 1920	9 May 1921	318 days	DVP
(2)	Robert Schmidt	Robert Schmidt (1864–1943)	10 May 1921	21 November 1922	1 year, 195 days	SPD
4	Johann Becker	Johann Becker (1869–1951)	22 November 1922	12 August 1923	263 days	DVP
5	Hans von Raumer	Hans von Raumer (1870–1965)	13 August 1923	5 October 1923	53 days	DVP
6	Joseph Koeth	Joseph Koeth (1870–1936)	5 October 1923	30 November 1923	55 days	Independent
7	Eduard Hamm	Eduard Hamm (1879–1944)	30 November 1923	15 December 1924	1 year, 15 days	DDP
8	Albert Neuhaus	Albert Neuhaus (1873–1948)	15 January 1925	26 October 1925	284 days	DNVP
–	Rudolf Krohne	Rudolf Krohne (1876–1953); Acting	27 October 1925	5 December 1925	39 days	DVP
9	Julius Curtius	Julius Curtius (1877–1948)	19 January 1926	11 November 1929	3 years, 296 days	DVP
10	Paul Moldenhauer	Paul Moldenhauer (1876–1947)	15 November 1929	23 December 1929	38 days	DVP
(2)	Robert Schmidt	Robert Schmidt (1864–1943)	24 December 1929	29 March 1930	95 days	SPD
11	Hermann Dietrich	Hermann Dietrich (1879–1954)	30 March 1930	26 June 1930	88 days	DStP
12	Ernst Trendelenburg	Ernst Trendelenburg (1882–1945)	27 June 1930	8 October 1931	1 year, 103 days	DStP
13	Hermann Warmbold	Hermann Warmbold (1876–1976)	9 October 1931	28 April 1932	202 days	Independent
–	Ernst Trendelenburg	Ernst Trendelenburg (1882–1945); Acting	28 April 1932	30 May 1932	32 days	DStP
(13)	Hermann Warmbold	Hermann Warmbold (1876–1976)	1 June 1932	28 January 1933	241 days	Independent

== Nazi Germany, 1933–1945 ==
Political Party: DNVP Independent NSDAP

No.	Portrait	Minister of Economics	Took office	Left office	Time in office	Party
14	Alfred Hugenberg	Alfred Hugenberg (1865–1951)	30 January 1933	29 June 1933	150 days	DNVP
15	Kurt Schmitt	Kurt Schmitt (1886–1950)	29 June 1933	3 August 1934	1 year, 35 days	NSDAP
16	Hjalmar Schacht	Hjalmar Schacht (1877–1970)	3 August 1934	26 November 1937	3 years, 115 days	Independent
17	Hermann Göring	Hermann Göring (1893–1946)	26 November 1937	15 January 1938	50 days	NSDAP
18	Walther Funk	Walther Funk (1890–1960)	5 February 1938	5 May 1945	7 years, 89 days	NSDAP
19	Albert Speer	Albert Speer (1905–1981)	5 May 1945	23 May 1945	18 days	NSDAP

== Federal Republic of Germany, 1949–present (until 1990 West Germany) ==
Political Party: CDU SPD FDP Independent CSU Green

Name (Born–died)		Portrait	Party	Term of Office		Chancellor (Cabinet)
Federal Minister for Economics
1	Ludwig Erhard (1897–1977)		CDU	20 September 1949	16 October 1963	Adenauer (I • II • III • IV • V)
2	Kurt Schmücker (1919–1996)		CDU	17 October 1963	30 November 1966	Erhard (I • II)
3	Karl Schiller (1911–1994)		SPD	1 December 1966	7 July 1972	Kiesinger; Brandt (I)
4	Helmut Schmidt (1918–2015)		SPD	7 July 1972	15 December 1972	Brandt (I)
5	Hans Friderichs (1931–2025)		FDP	15 December 1972	7 October 1977	Brandt (II); Schmidt (I • II)
6	Otto Graf Lambsdorff (1926–2009)		FDP	7 October 1977	17 September 1982	Schmidt (II • III)
7	Manfred Lahnstein (born 1937)		SPD	17 September 1982	1 October 1982	Schmidt (III)
8 (6)	Otto Graf Lambsdorff (1926–2009)		FDP	4 October 1982	27 June 1984	Kohl (I • II)
9	Martin Bangemann (1934–2022)		FDP	27 June 1984	9 December 1988	Kohl (II • III)
10	Helmut Haussmann (born 1943)		FDP	9 December 1988	18 January 1991	Kohl (III)
11	Jürgen Möllemann (1945–2003)		FDP	18 January 1991	21 January 1993	Kohl (IV)
12	Günter Rexrodt (1941–2004)		FDP	21 January 1993	26 October 1998	Kohl (IV • V)
Federal Minister for Economics and Technology
13	Werner Müller (1946–2019)		IND (for the SPD)	27 October 1998	22 October 2002	Schröder (I)
Federal Minister for Economics and Labour
14	Wolfgang Clement (1940–2020)		SPD	22 October 2002	22 November 2005	Schröder (II)
Federal Minister for Economics and Technology
15	Michael Glos (born 1944)		CSU	22 November 2005	10 February 2009	Merkel (I)
16	Karl-Theodor zu Guttenberg (born 1971)		CSU	10 February 2009	28 October 2009	Merkel (I)
17	Rainer Brüderle (born 1945)		FDP	28 October 2009	12 May 2011	Merkel (II)
18	Philipp Rösler (born 1973)		FDP	12 May 2011	17 December 2013	Merkel (II)
Federal Minister for Economic Affairs and Energy
19	Sigmar Gabriel (born 1958)		SPD	17 December 2013	27 January 2017	Merkel (III)
20	Brigitte Zypries (born 1953)		SPD	27 January 2017	14 March 2018	Merkel (III)
21	Peter Altmaier (born 1958)		CDU	14 March 2018	8 December 2021	Merkel (IV)
Federal Minister for Economic Affairs and Climate Action
22	Robert Habeck (born 1969)		Green	8 December 2021	6 May 2025	Scholz (Scholz)
Federal Minister for Economic Affairs and Energy
23	Katherina Reiche (born 1973)		CDU	6 May 2025	Incumbent	Merz (Merz)

== East Germany (1949–1990) ==
Note: Until 1989 East Germany had no Ministry of Economic Affairs but several ministries governing different part of the economy. Only in 1989, the Ministry of Economic Affairs was founded.

No.	Portrait	Minister of Economics	Took office	Left office	Time in office	Party
1	Christa Luft	Christa Luft (born 1938)	18 November 1989	18 March 1990	120 days	SED
2	Gerhard Pohl	Gerhard Pohl (1937–2012)	12 April 1990	16 August 1990	126 days	CDU
