= Federal Ministry for Economic Affairs and Energy =

Federal ministry of the Federal Republic of Germany

- Bundesministerium für Wirtschaft und Energie

Agency overview
- Formed: 23 October 1917 as the Reichswirtschaftsamt
- Jurisdiction: Government of Germany
- Headquarters: Berlin, Bonn
- Employees: 2,187
- Annual budget: €10.434 billion (2021)
- Minister responsible: Katherina Reiche, Federal Minister for Economic Affairs and Energy
- Website: bmwe.bund.de

The Federal Ministry for Economic Affairs and Energy (German: Bundesministerium für Wirtschaft und Energie, [ˈbʊndəsminɪsˌteːʁiʊm fyːɐ̯ ˈvɪʁt.ʃaft ʔʊnt eneʁˈɡiː]; abbreviated BMWE, formerly BMWK and BMWi) is a cabinet-level ministry of the Federal Republic of Germany. It was previously known as the "Ministry of Economy". It was recreated in 2005 as "Ministry of Economics and Technology" after it had previously been merged with other ministries to form the Federal Ministry for Economics and Labour between 2002 and 2005. The ministry is advised by the Council of Advisors on Digital Economy.

== History ==
The historical predecessor of the current Federal Ministry for Economic Affairs and Climate Action was the Reichswirtschaftsamt (Reich Economic Office), founded in 1917. In 1919, this became the Reichswirtschaftsministerium (Reich Ministry of Economy), which existed until 1945.

In postwar occupied Germany, its functions were exercised by the Administrative Office of Economy (German: Verwaltungsamt für Wirtschaft) between 1946 and 1949. After the founding of the Federal Republic of Germany, the Federal Ministry of Economics (German: Bundesministerium für Wirtschaft) existed from 1949 to 1998. From May 1971 to December 1972, it was temporarily merged with the Federal Ministry of Finance, in the Federal Ministry of Economics and Finance. In 1998 the technology section of the Ministry of Research was added, making it the Federal Ministry of Economics and Technology.

Between 2002 and 2005, it was merged with the Federal Ministry of Economics and Technology and one part of the Federal Ministry of Labour and Social Affairs - the other part being merged with the old Federal Ministry for Health, then the Ministry of Health and Social Security. This transformations aimed to consolidate the policy-fields of economics and labour market, on which the second term of chancellor Gerhard Schröder wanted to focus, into one hand. Because the new Ministry was very large and important, it was often referred to as a super-ministry (Superministerium) and its minister as a super-minister (Superminister). The creation of the new Ministry was widely seen as failed, basically because of the poor performance of the only office-holder Wolfgang Clement.

Under the following grand coalition headed by Angela Merkel, the portfolio reshuffle was reversed, and the old Federal Ministries of Economics and Technology, of Labour and Social Affairs and of Health were created once again as Federal Ministry of Economics and Technology. It was renamed to Federal Ministry for Economic Affairs and Energy in 2013.

- In order of the Federal Republic of Germany the Ministry has published a fact sheet on the unique dual vocational training system.

== Structure ==
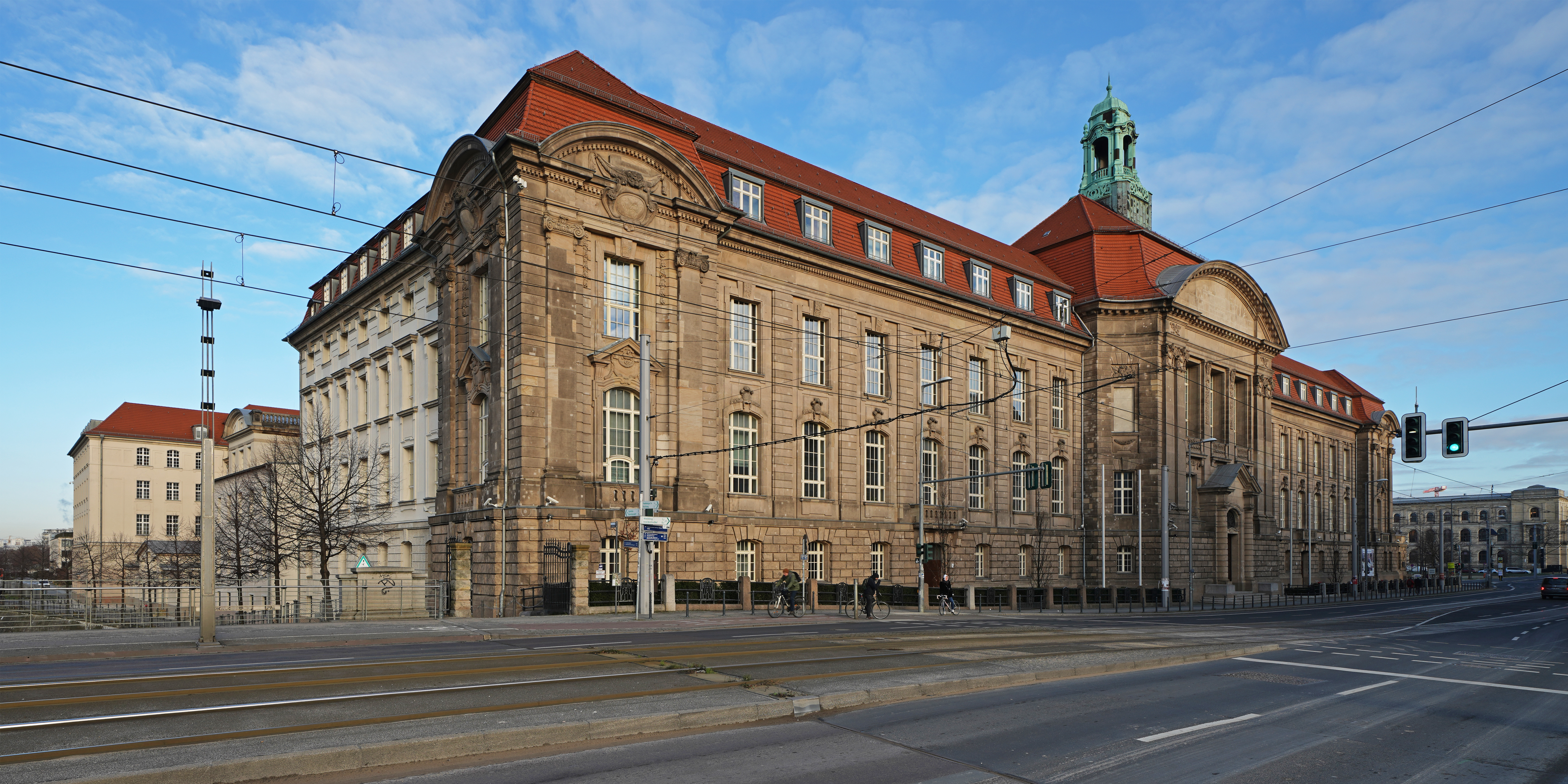
Headquarters

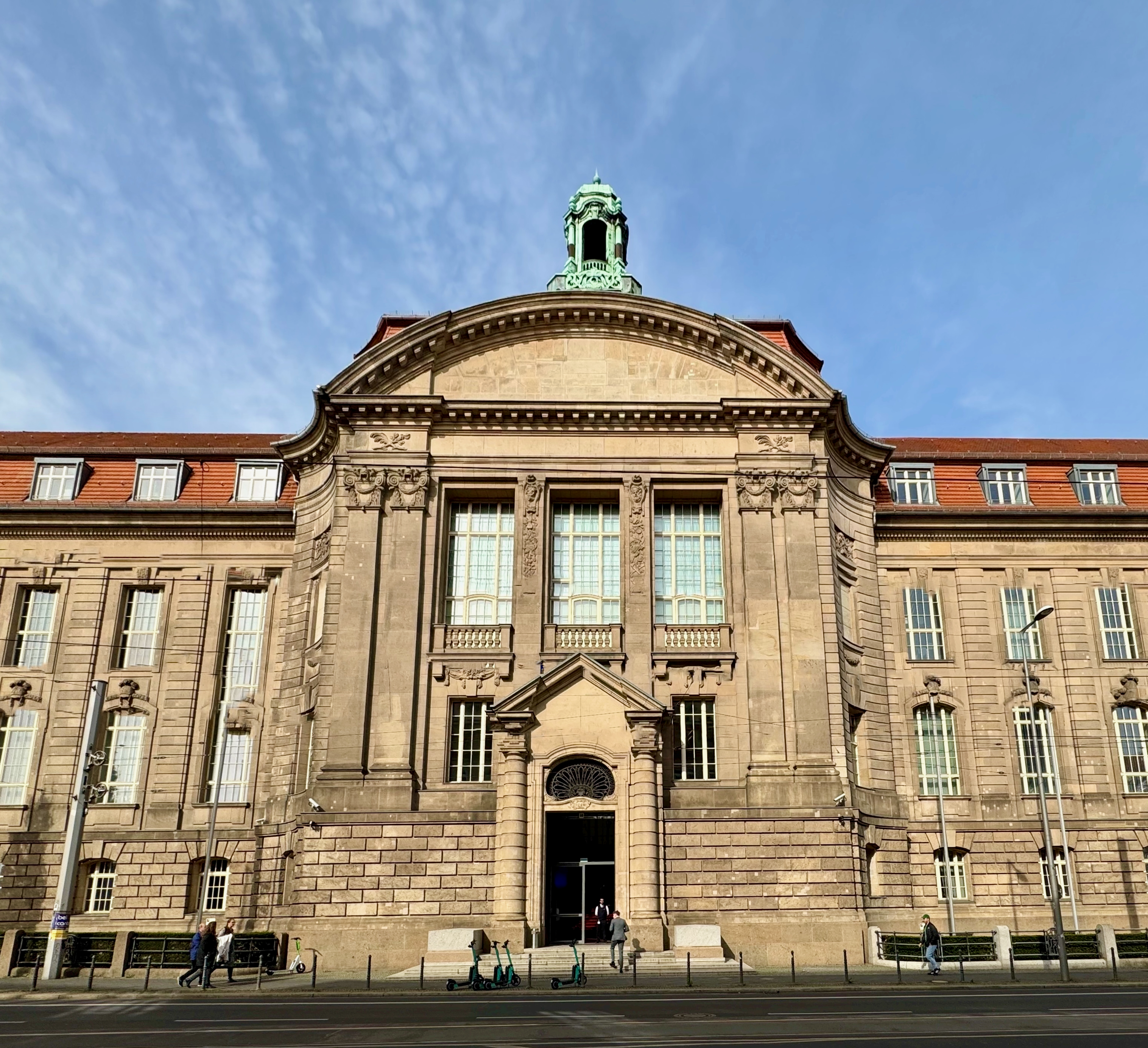
Façade

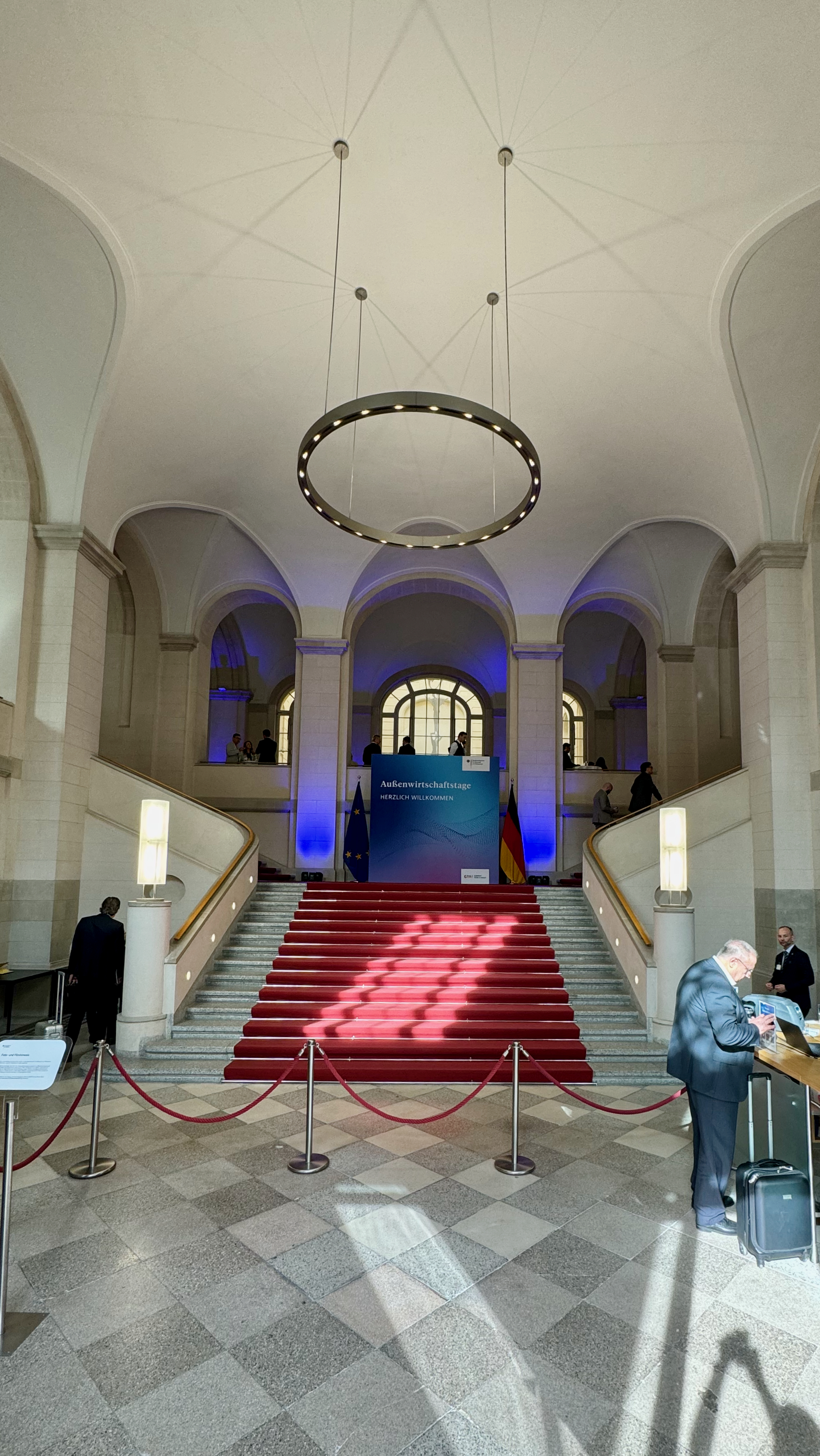
Entrance hall

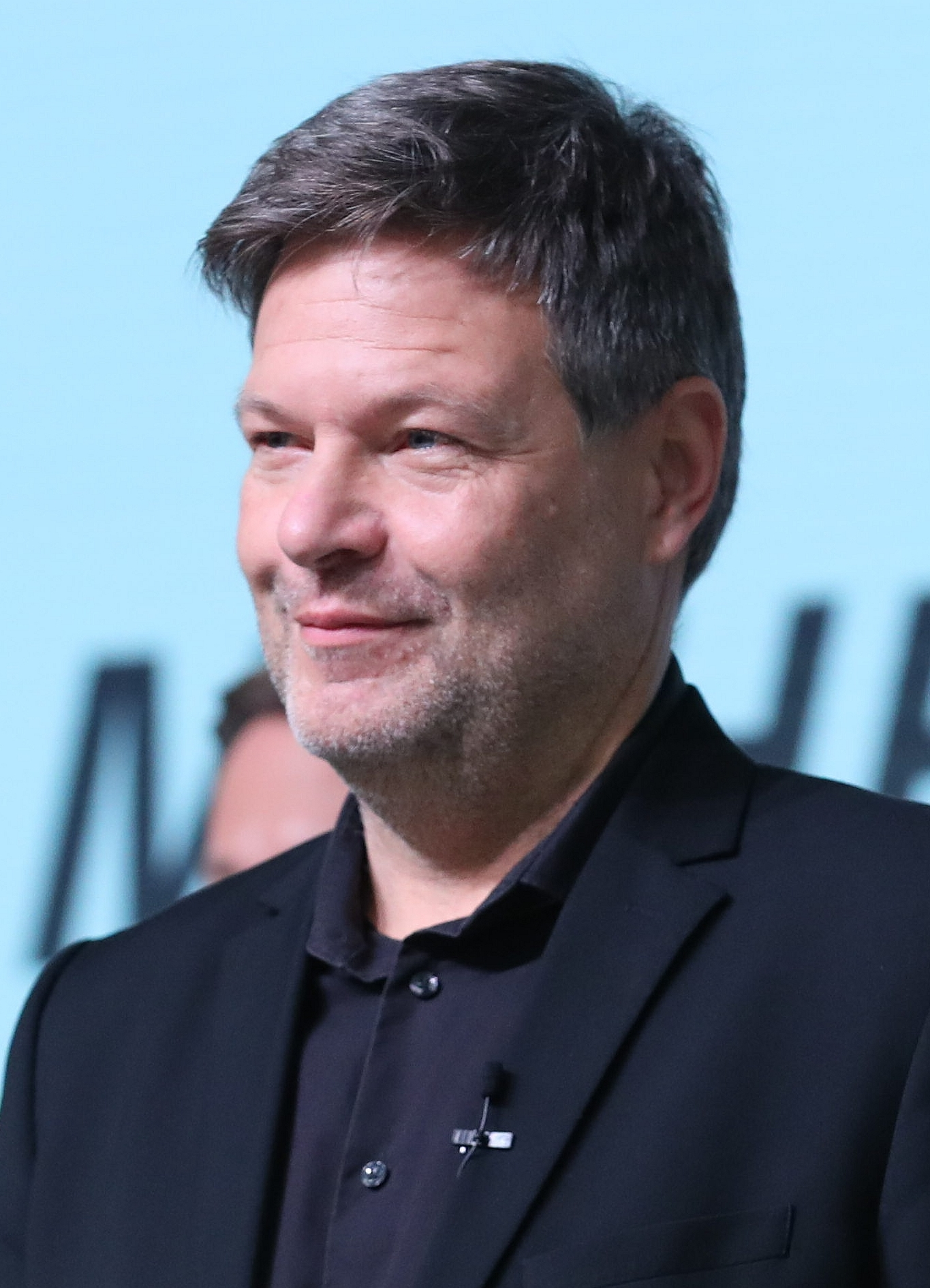
Robert Habeck, Greens

The Ministry is organised into 10 departments and one central department.

- Central Administration – Z
- European Policy – E
- Economic Policy – I
- Economic Stabilisation and Energy Security – WE
- Climate Action – K
- Energy Policy: Heating and Efficiency – II
- Energy Policy: Electricity and Grid – III
- Industrial Policy – IV
- External Economic Policy – V
- Digital and Innovation Policy – VI
- SME Policy - VII

The ministry is headquartered in Berlin.

== Agencies ==
In addition to its own operations, the Ministry also oversees the following agencies:

- Federal Cartel Office
- Federal Network Agency
- Federal Office of Economics and Export Control
- Federal Institute for Materials Research and Testing
- Federal Institute for Geosciences and Natural Resources
- German National Metrology Institute

== Ministers and Secretaries of State ==
=== Ministers ===
Political Party: CDU SPD FDP IND CSU Greens

Name (Born–died)		Portrait	Party	Term of Office		Chancellor (Cabinet)
Federal Minister for Economics
1	Ludwig Erhard (1897–1977)		CDU	20 September 1949	16 October 1963	Adenauer (I • II • III • IV • V)
2	Kurt Schmücker (1919–1996)		CDU	17 October 1963	30 November 1966	Erhard (I • II)
3	Karl Schiller (1911–1994)		SPD	1 December 1966	7 July 1972	Kiesinger; Brandt (I)
4	Helmut Schmidt (1918–2015)		SPD	7 July 1972	15 December 1972	Brandt (I)
5	Hans Friderichs (1931–2025)		FDP	15 December 1972	7 October 1977	Brandt (II); Schmidt (I • II)
6	Otto Graf Lambsdorff (1926–2009)		FDP	7 October 1977	17 September 1982	Schmidt (II • III)
7	Manfred Lahnstein (born 1937)		SPD	17 September 1982	1 October 1982	Schmidt (III)
8 (6)	Otto Graf Lambsdorff (1926–2009)		FDP	4 October 1982	27 June 1984	Kohl (I • II)
9	Martin Bangemann (1934–2022)		FDP	27 June 1984	9 December 1988	Kohl (II • III)
10	Helmut Haussmann (born 1943)		FDP	9 December 1988	18 January 1991	Kohl (III)
11	Jürgen Möllemann (1945–2003)		FDP	18 January 1991	21 January 1993	Kohl (IV)
12	Günter Rexrodt (1941–2004)		FDP	21 January 1993	26 October 1998	Kohl (IV • V)
Federal Minister for Economics and Technology
13	Werner Müller (1946–2019)		IND (for the SPD)	27 October 1998	22 October 2002	Schröder (I)
Federal Minister for Economics and Labour
14	Wolfgang Clement (1940–2020)		SPD	22 October 2002	22 November 2005	Schröder (II)
Federal Minister for Economics and Technology
15	Michael Glos (born 1944)		CSU	22 November 2005	10 February 2009	Merkel (I)
16	Karl-Theodor zu Guttenberg (born 1971)		CSU	10 February 2009	28 October 2009	Merkel (I)
17	Rainer Brüderle (born 1945)		FDP	28 October 2009	12 May 2011	Merkel (II)
18	Philipp Rösler (born 1973)		FDP	12 May 2011	17 December 2013	Merkel (II)
Federal Minister for Economic Affairs and Energy
19	Sigmar Gabriel (born 1958)		SPD	17 December 2013	27 January 2017	Merkel (III)
20	Brigitte Zypries (born 1953)		SPD	27 January 2017	14 March 2018	Merkel (III)
21	Peter Altmaier (born 1958)		CDU	14 March 2018	8 December 2021	Merkel (IV)
Federal Minister for Economic Affairs and Climate Action
22	Robert Habeck (born 1969)		Greens	8 December 2021	6 May 2025	Scholz (Scholz)
Federal Minister for Economic Affairs and Energy
23	Katherina Reiche (born 1973)		CDU	6 May 2025	Incumbent	Merz (Merz)

=== Secretaries ===
==== Ministry for Economy (1949–1998) ====
Parliamentary State Secretaries

- 1967–1970: Klaus Dieter Arndt, SPD
- 1970–1971: Philip Rosenthal, SPD
- 1972: Rainer Offergeld, SPD
- 1972–1987: Martin Grüner, FDP/DVP
- 1983–1987: Rudolf Sprung, CDU
- 1987–1989: Ludolf-Georg von Wartenberg, CDU
- 1987–1993: Erich Riedl, CSU
- 1989–1992: Klaus Beckmann, FDP
- 1992–1998: Heinrich Leonhard Kolb, FDP
- 1993–1994: Reinhard Göhner, CDU
- 1994–1997: Norbert Lammert, CDU

State Secretaries

- 1949–1951: Eduard Schalfejew
- 1951–1963: Ludger Westrick, no party
- 1958–1963: Alfred Müller-Armack, CDU
- 1963–1966: Wolfram Langer
- 1963–1968: Fritz Neef
- 1967–1972: Johann Baptist Schöllhorn
- 1968–1969: Klaus von Dohnanyi, SPD
- 1969–1978: Detlev Karsten Rohwedder, SPD
- 1972: Ernst Wolf Mommsen
- 1973–1991: Otto Schlecht
- 1979–1995: Dieter von Würzen
- 1991–1994: Johann Eekhoff
- 1994–1997: Johannes Ludewig
- 1995–1998: Lorenz Schomerus
- 1997–1998: Rudi Geil, CDU
- 1997–1998: Klaus Bünger

==== Ministry for Economics and Technology (1998–2002) ====
Parliamentary State Secretaries

- 1998–2002: Siegmar Mosdorf, SPD

State Secretaries

- 1998–2002: Alfred Tacke, SPD
- 1999–2002: Axel Gerlach

==== Ministry for Economics and Labour (2002–2005) ====
Parliamentary State Secretaries

- 2002–2005: Gerd Andres, SPD
- 2002–2005: Rezzo Schlauch, Greens
- 2002–2005: Ditmar Staffelt, SPD

State Secretaries

- 1999–2003: Axel Gerlach
- 2002–2004: Alfred Tacke, SPD
- 2002–2005: Rudolf Anzinger
- 2002–2005: Georg-Wilhelm Adamowitsch
- 2004–2005: Bernd Pfaffenbach

==== Ministry for Economics and Technology (2005–2013) ====
Parliamentary State Secretaries

- 2005–2013: Peter Hintze, CDU
- 2005–2009: Dagmar Wöhrl, CSU
- 2005–2009: Hartmut Schauerte, CDU
- 2009–2013: Ernst Burgbacher, FDP
- 2009–2013: Hans-Joachim Otto, FDP

State Secretaries

- 2005–2006: Georg-Wilhelm Adamowitsch
- 2005–2008: Joachim Wuermeling, CSU
- 2006–2009: Walther Otremba
- 2005–2011: Bernd Pfaffenbach
- 2008–2012: Jochen Homann
- 2009–2013: Bernhard Heitzer, FDP
- 2011–2013: Stefan Kapferer, FDP
- 2012–2013: Anne Herkes

==== Ministry for Economic Affairs and Energy (2013–2021) ====
Parliamentary State Secretaries

- 2013–2017: Brigitte Zypries, SPD
- 2013–2018: Uwe Beckmeyer, SPD
- 2013–2018: Iris Gleicke, SPD
- 2017–2018: Dirk Wiese, SPD
- 2018–2019: Oliver Wittke, CDU
- 2018–2020: Christian Hirte, CDU
- 2018–2021: Thomas Bareiß, CDU
- 2019–2021: Elisabeth Winkelmeier-Becker, CDU
- 2020–2021: Marco Wanderwitz, CDU

State Secretaries

- 2013–2018: Rainer Baake, Greens
- 2014–2018: Matthias Machnig, SPD
- 2013–2017: Rainer Sontowski, SPD

==== Ministry for Economic Affairs and Climate Action (since 2021) ====
Parliamentary State Secretaries

- 2021–2022: Oliver Krischer, Greens
- 2021-2025: Franziska Brantner, Greens
- 2021-2025: Michael Kellner, Greens
- 2022-2025: Stefan Wenzel, Greens
- since 2025: Gitta Connemann, CDU
- since 2025: Stefan Rouenhoff, CDU

State Secretaries

- 2021–2023: Patrick Graichen, Greens
- 2021-2024: Sven Giegold, Greens
- 2021-2025: Anja Hajduk, Greens
- 2021-2025: Udo Philipp, Greens
- 2023-2025: Philipp Nimmermann, Greens
- 2024-2025: Bernhard Kluttig
- since 2025: Frank Wetzel
- since 2025: Thomas Steffen
