= Third Kohl cabinet =

West and unified German government from 1987 to 1991

Third Cabinet of Helmut Kohl Cabinet Kohl III
- 15th Cabinet of the Federal Republic of Germany
- 12 March 1987 – 20 December 1990 (until 18 January 1991 as caretaker government)
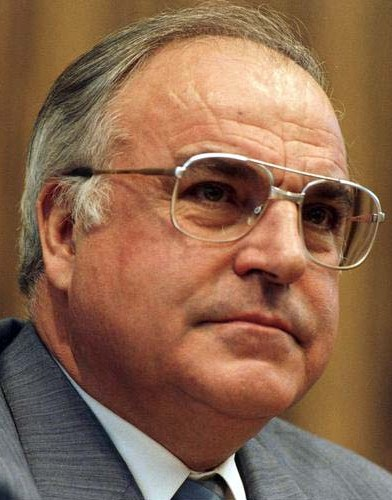
- Helmut Kohl
- Date formed: 12 March 1987
- Date dissolved: 18 January 1991 (3 years, 10 months and 5 days)

People and organisations
- President: Richard von Weizsäcker
- Chancellor: Helmut Kohl
- Vice-Chancellor: Hans-Dietrich Genscher
- Member party: Christian Democratic Union; Christian Social Union; Free Democratic Party; German Social Union (October 1990 – January 1991)
- Status in legislature: Coalition government
- Opposition party: Social Democratic Party; The Greens; Party of Democratic Socialism (From 1990); United Left (From 1990)
- Opposition leader: Hans-Jochen Vogel (SPD)

History
- Election: 1987 federal election
- Legislature terms: 11th Bundestag
- Predecessor: De Maizière (East Germany); Kohl II
- Successor: Kohl IV

The Third Kohl cabinet led by Helmut Kohl was sworn in on March 12, 1987. The cabinet was formed after the 1987 elections. This cabinet oversaw the German Reunification. It laid down its function on January 18, 1991, after the formation of the Fourth Kohl cabinet, which was formed following the 1990 elections.

== Composition ==
The third Kohl cabinet had 21 members.

Cabinet members
Portfolio	Minister	Took office	Left office	Party
Chancellor	Helmut Kohl	12 March 1987	18 January 1991	CDU
Vice Chancellor & Federal Minister of Foreign Affairs	Hans-Dietrich Genscher	12 March 1987	18 January 1991	FDP
Federal Minister of Defense	Manfred Wörner	12 March 1987	18 May 1988	CDU
Federal Minister of Defense	Rupert Scholz	18 May 1988	21 April 1989	CDU
Federal Minister of Defense	Gerhard Stoltenberg	21 April 1989	18 January 1991	CDU
Federal Minister of the Interior	Friedrich Zimmermann	12 March 1987	21 April 1989	CSU
Federal Minister of the Interior	Wolfgang Schäuble	21 April 1989	18 January 1991	CDU
Federal Minister of Finance	Gerhard Stoltenberg	12 March 1987	21 April 1989	CDU
Federal Minister of Finance	Theo Waigel	21 April 1989	18 January 1991	CSU
Federal Minister of Justice	Hans A. Engelhard	12 March 1987	18 January 1991	FDP
Federal Minister of Economics	Martin Bangemann	12 March 1987	9 December 1988	FDP
Federal Minister of Economics	Helmut Haussmann	9 December 1988	18 January 1991	FDP
Federal Minister of Labour and Social Affairs	Norbert Blüm	12 March 1987	18 January 1991	CDU
Federal Minister of Food, Agriculture, and Forestry	Ignaz Kiechle	12 March 1987	18 January 1991	CSU
Federal Minister of Transport	Jürgen Warnke	12 March 1987	21 April 1989	CSU
Federal Minister of Transport	Friedrich Zimmermann	21 April 1989	18 January 1991	CSU
Federal Minister of Construction	Oscar Schneider	12 March 1987	21 April 1989	CSU
Federal Minister of Construction	Gerda Hasselfeldt	21 April 1989	18 January 1991	CSU
Federal Minister of Youth, Family, and Health	Rita Süssmuth	12 March 1987	9 December 1988	CDU
Federal Minister of Youth, Family, and Health	Ursula Lehr	9 December 1988	18 January 1991	CDU
Federal Minister of Research and Technology	Heinz Riesenhuber	12 March 1987	18 January 1991	CDU
Federal Minister of Education and Science	Jürgen Möllemann	12 March 1987	18 January 1991	FDP
Federal Minister of Economic Cooperation	Hans Klein	12 March 1987	21 April 1989	CSU
Federal Minister of Economic Cooperation	Jürgen Warnke	21 April 1989	18 January 1991	CSU
Federal Minister of Environment, Nature Conservation, and Reactor Security	Walter Wallmann	12 March 1987	22 April 1987	CDU
Federal Minister of Environment, Nature Conservation, and Reactor Security	Klaus Töpfer	22 April 1987	18 January 1991	CDU
Federal Minister of Posts and Communications	Christian Schwarz-Schilling	12 March 1987	18 January 1991	CDU
Federal Minister of Intra-German Relations	Dorothee Wilms	12 March 1987	18 January 1991	CDU
Federal Minister of Special Affairs & Head of the Chancellery	Wolfgang Schäuble	12 March 1987	21 April 1989	CDU
Federal Minister of Special Affairs & Head of the Chancellery	Rudolf Seiters	21 April 1989	18 January 1991	CDU
Federal Minister of Special Affairs & Government Spokesman-in-chief	Hans Klein	21 April 1989	20. Dezember 1990	CSU
Federal Minister of Special Affairs	Lothar de Maizière	3 October 1990	19 December 1990	CDU
Federal Minister of Special Affairs	Sabine Bergmann-Pohl	3 October 1990	18 January 1991	CDU
Federal Minister of Special Affairs	Günther Krause	3 October 1990	18 January 1991	CDU
Federal Minister of Special Affairs	Rainer Ortleb	3 October 1990	18 January 1991	FDP
Federal Minister of Special Affairs	Hansjoachim Walther	3 October 1990	18 January 1991	DSU
