= Rudolf Sprung =

German politician

Member of the Bundestag
- In office 20 October 1969 – 10 November 1994

Parliamentary State Secretary for Economic Affairs
- In office 1983–1987
- Minister: Otto Graf Lambsdorff; Martin Bangemann
- Preceded by: Martin Grüner
- Succeeded by: Ludolf-Georg von Wartenberg

Personal details
- Born: 16 September 1925 Wieze, Province of Hanover, Free State of Prussia, Weimar Republic
- Died: 18 March 2015 (aged 89) Goslar; Lower Saxony, Germany
- Party: CDU
- Spouse(s): Maria-Luise Janssen (m. 1952; div. 1970) Dr. Gisela Modersohn-Sprung (m. 1977)
- Children: 5 (Thomas, Ulrike, Annette, Markus, Friederike)
- Parent(s): Friedrich Sprung and Ella Sprung
- Education: University of Göttingen

Rudolf Sprung (September 16, 1925 – March 18, 2015) was a German politician of the Christian Democratic Union (CDU) and former member of the German Bundestag.

== Life ==
Sprung fought between 1943 and 1945 as a soldier in World War II. The British captured him in the last days of the war and he was taken prisoner of war. After his release from captivity, he passed the Abitur in 1946 and then studied economics in Göttingen, graduating in 1949 with a degree in economics. He then worked as a research assistant at the University of Göttingen and received his PhD in 1952. Sprung joined then Friedrich Krupp in Essen as assistant director. But soon after in 1953 he joined the Federal Ministry of Finance in Bonn until 1958. He became a member of German delegation to European Economic Community and Euratom and was from 1959 to 1963 the deputy director at the European Investment Bank in Brussels.

In the 1960s he served as managing partner at Heinrich Hottenrott in Goslar.

Sprung had been a member of the CDU since 1960. For many years he was chairman of the CDU district association in Goslar and the CDU regional association in Braunschweig. From 1969 to 1994 Sprung was a member of the German Bundestag. Here he was deputy chairman of the Finance Committee from 1980 to 1982.

During his political career he reached the level of Parliamentary Secretary of State, Federal Ministry of Economics.

== Literature ==
Herbst, Ludolf; Jahn, Bruno (2002). Vierhaus, Rudolf (ed.). Biographisches Handbuch der Mitglieder des Deutschen Bundestages. 1949–2002 [Biographical Handbook of the Members of the German Bundestag. 1949–2002] (in German). München: De Gruyter - De Gruyter Saur. p. 1715. ISBN 978-3-11-184511-1.
