= Heinrich Kolb =

German politician

Heinrich Leonhard Kolb (born 8 January 1956) is a German politician, from Babenhausen, Hesse. Under Helmut Kohl's fourth and fifth cabinets, he was Parliamentary State Secretary in the Federal Ministry for Economy from 1992 to 1998. A member of FDP, he served in the Bundestag from 1990 to 2013.
