= Johann Eekhoff =

German economist

- Born: 25 July 1941
- Died: 3 March 2013 (aged 71)

Academic background
- Education: Saarland University; Ruhr University Bochum

Academic work
- Discipline: Political economics
- School or tradition: Ordoliberalism
- Institutions: University of Cologne

Johann Eekhoff (25 July 1941 – 3 March 2013) was a German economist and former state secretary of the Federal Ministry of Economics and Technology. He held a chair for economic policy at the University of Cologne until 2009.

A native of Moormerland, East Frisia, Eekhoff studied economics at the Saarland University, Philadelphia University, and Ruhr University Bochum. He earned his Ph.D. from Ruhr University Bochum in 1971, and his Habilitation from Saarland University in 1979. Between 1991 and 1993 he served as state secretary under Federal Ministers Jürgen Möllemann and Günter Rexrodt.
