= Rainer Ortleb =

German academic and politician

Rainer Ortleb Bundesminister a. D.
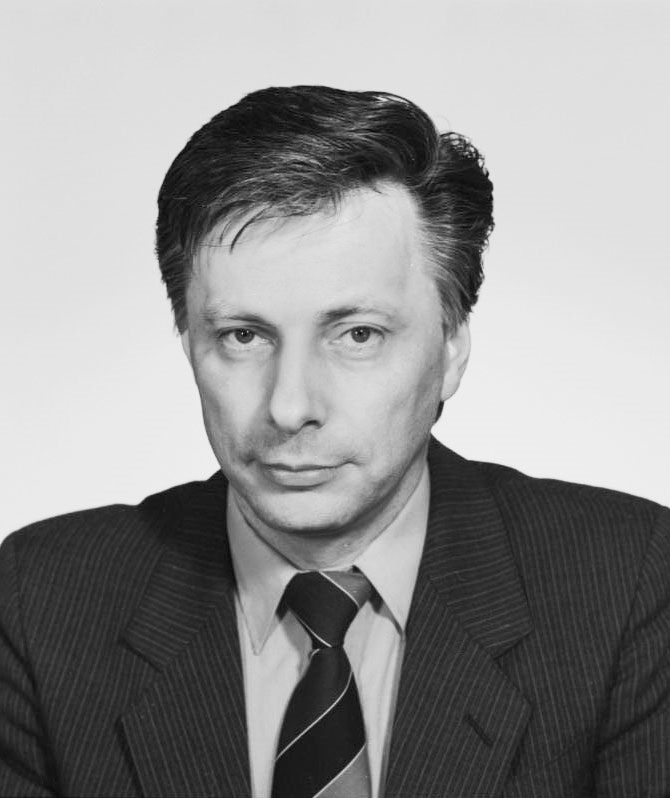
- Ortleb in 1990

Leader of the Liberal Democratic Party
- In office 10 February 1990 – 11 August 1990
- Preceded by: Manfred Gerlach
- Succeeded by: Position abolished Otto Graf Lambsdorff (as Leader of the Free Democratic Party)

Minister of Education and Research
- In office 12 January 1991 – 4 February 1994
- Chancellor: Helmut Kohl
- Preceded by: Jürgen Möllemann
- Succeeded by: Karl-Hans Laermann

Minister for Special Affairs
- In office 3 October 1990 – 17 January 1991 Serving with Hans Klein, Rudolf Seiters, Lothar de Maizière, Sabine Bergmann-Pohl, Günther Krause, Hansjoachim Walther
- Chancellor: Helmut Kohl
- Preceded by: Position established
- Succeeded by: Position abolished

Leader of Die Liberalen group in the Volkskammer
- In office 5 April 1990 – 2 October 1990
- Preceded by: Position established
- Succeeded by: Wolfgang Mischnick (as Leader of the Free Democratic Party in the Bundestag)
Parliamentary constituencies
Member of the Bundestag for Mecklenburg-Vorpommern (Volkskammer; 1990)
In office 3 October 1990 – 26 October 1998
Preceded by	Constituency established
Succeeded by	multi-member district
Member of the Volkskammer for Dresden
In office 5 April 1990 – 2 October 1990
Preceded by	Constituency established
Succeeded by	Constituency abolished

Personal details
- Born: 5 June 1944 (age 82) Gera, Thuringia, Soviet occupation zone (now Germany)
- Party: Independent
- Other political affiliations: Free Democratic Party (1990–2001); Liberal Democratic Party (1968–1990)
- Children: 2
- Education: Dresden University of Technology (Dr. rer. nat.) (Dr.-Ing. habil.)
- Occupation: Politician; Academic; Mathematician

Rainer Ortleb (born 5 June 1944) is a German academic and politician.

From October 1990 he served under Helmut Kohl as a Federal Minister for Special Affairs in Germany's first post-reunification government. In the next government, between 1991 and 1994, he served as Federal Minister of Education and Research.

== Life ==
=== Early years ===
Ortleb was born directly after the war in the eastern part of Thuringia, then a part of the Soviet occupation zone in what had until recently been central southern Germany. During his early years the zone became the newly created German Democratic Republic. Ortleb successfully completed his schooling in 1962 and undertook military service with the National People's Army until 1964, then signing up as an army reserve officer.

=== Academic ===
He studied Mathematics at Dresden, obtaining his first degree in 1963 and his doctorate in 1971. In 1977 he became a senior research assistant, still at the Dresden University of Technology. Here, for several years, he also headed up an "Army Reserve Collective", in the end reaching the rank of lieutenant. Further academic promotion (Habilitation) to the status of "Dr.-Ing. (engineering)" followed in 1983, on the basis of a paper entitled "Baustein-Terminal in Dialogsystemen", after which his academic work focused on Information Systems. He moved north in 1984, to Rostock University where he lectured on information systems processing, was appointed an associate professor in 1989, and where he worked from 1992 to 1998 as Professor for Technical Systems Applications Software.

=== Political ===
Ortleb joined the Liberal Democratic Party of Germany (LDPD) in 1968. The East German LDPD was one of five constituent Bloc parties controlled by the country's ruling SED party through a political structure called the National Front. He subsequently held various positions within the LDPD, joining the regional party secretariat for Dresden in 1976. His political career started moving to Rostock before his academic career, and in 1978 he was elected LDPD regional chairman for the Rostock region. In 1982, however, he was additionally appointed chairman of the LDPD's district executive for the party in Dresden-south. At the LDPD party conference at Weimar on 3 March 1977, he appeared, not for the last time at a party conference, in his army uniform and gave a rousing speech in praise of national defense. He spoke with eloquence and some passion: "My first argument is visible to you all, this uniform ... the result, the exercise in the art of war, is forced on us daily by the actions of the imperialists" Western observers subsequently identified more than a trace of irony in his performance.

The Berlin Wall was breached in November, ushering in a period of rapid transition which by August 1990 had led to German reunification. On 10 February 1990 the LDPD held a Special Party Conference at Dresden, the outcome of which was a new name and a new Party Chairman. The new name was actually the old name which the party had been required to abandon in 1951. The Liberal Democratic Party (LPD / Liberal-Demokratische Partei ) elected Rainer Ortleb as its new chairman - effectively the party leader - in succession to Manfred Gerlach. East Germany's first and last national free election took place in March 1990 with the party (in alliance with a couple of recently emerged like minded and short-lived groupings) won 21 seats under Ortleb's leadership, and a junior role in East Germany's governing coalition under Lothar de Maizière. Ortleb's career as a party leader was cut short in August 1990, however, when his LDP merged with its West German counterpart, the FDP (Freie Demokratische Partei).

Following the merger of the LDP with the FDP Rainer Ortleb became regional party chairman in Mecklenburg-Vorpommern between 1991 and 1994. In 1997 he became the FDP regional party chairman in Saxony, becoming in the process the only FDP politician to be a regional party chairman successively in two different regions.

In 1999 Ortleb resigned from his party chairmanship in Saxony following poor performance in a regional election for which his name had been at the top of the FDP candidate list. Two years later, following differences within the party over support for Ingolf Roßberg as the party's (successful) candidate as mayor of Dresden, Ortleb resigned from the party in 2001.

In the 2009 election Ortleb gave his support to "Die Linke", the successor to East Germany's old ruling SED (party). In November 2009 he gave a wide-ranging press interview celebrating the twentieth anniversary of the fall of the Berlin Wall, in which he called for a reorientation of his former party, the FDP.

=== National Parliament ===
The East German election in March 1990 saw the liberal alliance led by Ortleb gaining more than 5% of the national vote. Ortleb, representing the Dresden constituency, was one of 21 Liberal Democrats who now entered the National Assembly (Volkskammer) where he led the Liberal group. He was one of the 144 deputies in the chamber who on 3 October 1990, as part of the German reunification process, became members of the Bundestag (National Assembly) of the reunited Germany. In the following two national elections, in December 1990 and in October 1994, he was elected to the Bundestag as a deputy for Mecklenburg-Vorpommern. Ortleb remained a member of the Bundestag until 1998.

=== Ministerial office ===
On 3 October 1990 Rainer Ortleb was one of the formerly East German political leaders to join the cabinet of the newly reunified Germany, under Federal Chancellor Kohl. Initially he served as a Minister without portfolio, but following the national election two months later, on 19 January 1991, Ortleb was appointed Minister for Science and Training in succession to Jürgen Möllemann. On 3 February 1994 he resigned from his ministerial position on health grounds.
