= Alfred Tacke =

German industrialist and politician

Alfred Tacke (born July 13, 1951, in Celle) is a German energy and chemical industrial manager and Social Democratic Party of Germany politician. He was a close advisor to Gerhard Schröder from 1990 to 2004 and was Werner Müller's State Secretary in the Federal Ministry for Economic Affairs and Climate Action in 1998. He was chairman of the management board of the electricity supply company STEAG from the end of 2004 to the end of 2006. From the beginning of 2007 to the end of 2008, he was chairman of the management board of Evonik Steag GmbH. From September 2006 to the end of 2008, Tacke was also a member of the executive board of RAG Beteiligungs-AG, which was renamed Evonik Industries AG in September 2007.

== Early life and background ==
After leaving school, Tacke studied economics at the universities of Freiburg and Berlin from 1971 to 1975. He then worked as an assistant at the University of Oldenburg, where he completed his doctorate in 1982 on developments in the German shipbuilding industry. Until 1990, he was a consultant for economic and environmental policy at the regional branch of the DGB in Hanover.

== Career ==
In 1990, following his election as Minister President of Lower Saxony, Gerhard Schröder appointed Tacke to the Lower Saxony State Chancellery as Head of the Department for Economic and Structural Policy. In 1991, Tacke replaced Gunter Kappert as civil servant State Secretary in the Lower Saxony Ministry of Economics, Technology and Transport. In 1998, under Gerhard Schröder, he became Werner Müller's State Secretary in the Federal Ministry for Economic Affairs and Climate Action.

From 2000, he was also responsible for preparing the G8 World Economic Summits as the Chancellor's "Sherpa (chief negotiator)". The State Secretary was regarded as a pragmatist and a good expert on the energy sector. In 2002, he gave ministerial approval for the takeover of Ruhrgas AG by E.ON on behalf of Economics Minister Müller.

In April 2004, Tacke was considered as a possible successor to Ernst Welteke as President of the German Bundesbank. At the end of 2004, Tacke gave up his post as State Secretary and became chairman of the Board of Management of the electricity supply company STEAG, a wholly owned subsidiary of RAG Aktiengesellschaft, in which E.ON in turn holds a stake. From the beginning of 2007 to the end of 2008, he was chairman of the management board of Evonik Steag GmbH. From September 2006 to the end of 2008, Tacke was also a member of the executive board of RAG Beteiligungs-AG, which was renamed Evonik Industries AG in September 2007.

In 2009, he became a member of the "Steering Council for Corporate Finance" at the Wirtschaftsfonds Deutschland (German Economic Fund).

== Personal life ==
He is the father of television presenter Sarah Tacke.
