= Wolfgang Schmidt (politician) =

German politician (born 1970)

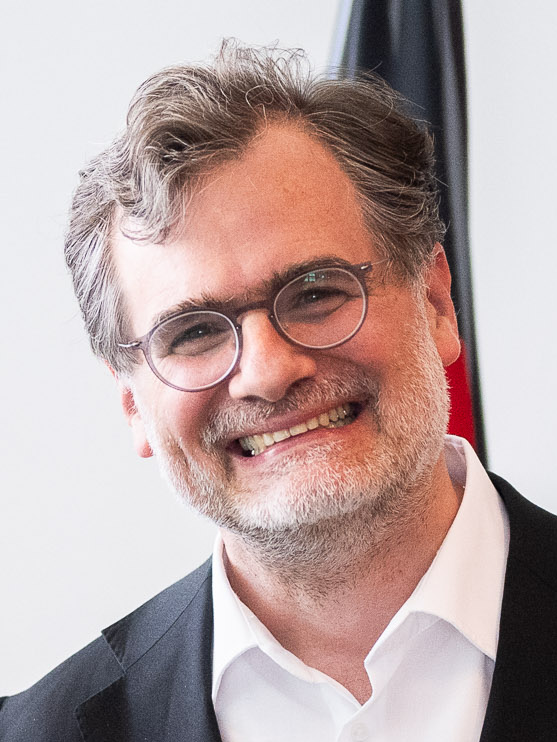
- Schmidt in 2024

Head of the Chancellery Minister for Special Affairs
- In office 8 December 2021 – 6 May 2025
- Chancellor: Olaf Scholz
- Preceded by: Helge Braun
- Succeeded by: Thorsten Frei

State Secretary in the Ministry of Finance
- In office 14 March 2018 – 8 December 2021 Serving with Werner Gatzer, Rolf Bösinger, Jörg Kukies
- Chancellor: Angela Merkel
- Minister: Olaf Scholz
- Preceded by: Thomas Steffen; Johannes Geismann
- Succeeded by: Steffen Saebisch; Werner Gatzer; Luise Hölscher

Counselor of State of the State Chancellery of Hamburg Representative for Federal Affairs
- In office 7 March 2011 – 28 March 2018
- First Mayor: Olaf Scholz
- Preceded by: Position established
- Succeeded by: Annette Tabbara

Personal details
- Born: Wolfgang Schmidt; 23 September 1970 (age 56) Hamburg, West Germany
- Party: Social Democratic Party (1989–)
- Children: 2
- Education: University of Hamburg; University of the Basque Country
- Occupation: Spindoctor; Lawyer; Political Staffer; Civil Servant
- Website: Official Government website

Wolfgang Schmidt (German pronunciation: [ˈvɔlfɡaŋ ˈʃmɪt]; born 23 September 1970) is a German politician and jurist who served as Federal Minister for Special Affairs, Head of the Chancellery and Commissioner for the Federal Intelligence Services from 2021 to 2025. He was previously State Secretary at the Federal Ministry of Finance under Minister Olaf Scholz in the government of Chancellor Angela Merkel from 2018 to 2021. In March 2026 German media reported Schmidt working for Microsoft.

Schmidt has been a close associate of Scholz since 2002 and is considered his spin doctor.

== Early life and education ==
Schmidt was born 23 September 1970, in Hamburg. He studied law at the University of Hamburg as well as the University of Deusto in Bilbao/Spain from 1991, graduating with his first state examination by 1997. Thereafter, he worked as Research associate at the University of Hamburg until 2000. Schmidt then served a two-year legal clerkship term at the Hanseatic Higher Regional Court until 2002, when he completed his second state examination.

== Career ==
From 2002 until 2005, Schmidt worked as advisor and later as chief of staff to Olaf Scholz in his capacity as the SPD's secretary general. He followed Scholz as chief of staff when the latter was appointed as whip of the SPD parliamentary group.

In the government of Chancellor Angela Merkel, Schmidt again served as Scholz's chief of staff at the Federal Ministry of Labour and Social Affairs.

From 2010 to 2011, Schmidt served as director of the International Labour Organization (ILO) representative office in Germany.

== Political career ==
Schmidt joined the youth organization of the Social Democratic Party, called the Jusos, in 1989 due to his interest in the third world.

On 6 December 2021, Schmidt was nominated as Federal Minister for Special Affairs and Head of the Chancellery in Scholz's cabinet, and was inaugurated by President Frank-Walter Steinmeier on 8 December.

After taking office, Schmidt was soon described in news media as "Olaf Scholz’s shadow foreign minister." Early in his tenure, he became a key architect of the policies outlines in Scholz's Zeitenwende speech. In February 2023, he appeared in parliament for the first time, explaining and defending the government's policies in a 90-minute question-and-answer session.

In October 2023, Schmidt participated in the first joint cabinet retreat of the German and French governments in Hamburg, chaired by Scholz and President Emmanuel Macron.

In August 2024, Schmidt announced his intention to run for a parliamentary seat in the 2025 national elections.

After ending his political career in May 2025, Schmidt registered a future job with Microsoft, but was restricted by law with a mandatory waiting period of 12 month.

== Other activities ==
=== International organizations ===
- Asian Infrastructure Investment Bank (AIIB), Ex-Officio Alternate Member of the Board of Governors (2018–2021)
- Multilateral Investment Guarantee Agency (MIGA), World Bank Group, Ex-Officio Alternate Member of the Board of Governors (2018–2021)
- World Bank, Ex-Officio Alternate Member of the Board of Governors (2018–2021)

=== Corporate boards ===
- Macro Advisory Partners, Senior Advisor (since 2026)
- Planet Labs, Member of the European Advisory Board (since 2026)
- Microsoft, Member of the Technology & National Security Advisory Council (since 2026)
- KfW, ex-officio Member of the Board of Supervisory Directors (2018–2021)
- German Investment Corporation (DEG), ex-officio Member of the supervisory board (2018–2021)

=== Non-profit organizations ===
- European Council on Foreign Relations (ECFR), Member (since 2025)
- Baden-Badener Unternehmer-Gespräche (BBUG), Member of the Board of Trustees (since 2021)
- Business Forum of the Social Democratic Party of Germany, Member of the advisory board on Economic Policy (since 2020)
- German Institute for International and Security Affairs (SWP), Member of the council (since 2018)
- Institute for European Politics (IEP), Member of the Board of Trustees

== Personal life ==
Schmidt has two daughters. He lives in Berlin.
