= Volker Rühe =

German politician (born 1942)

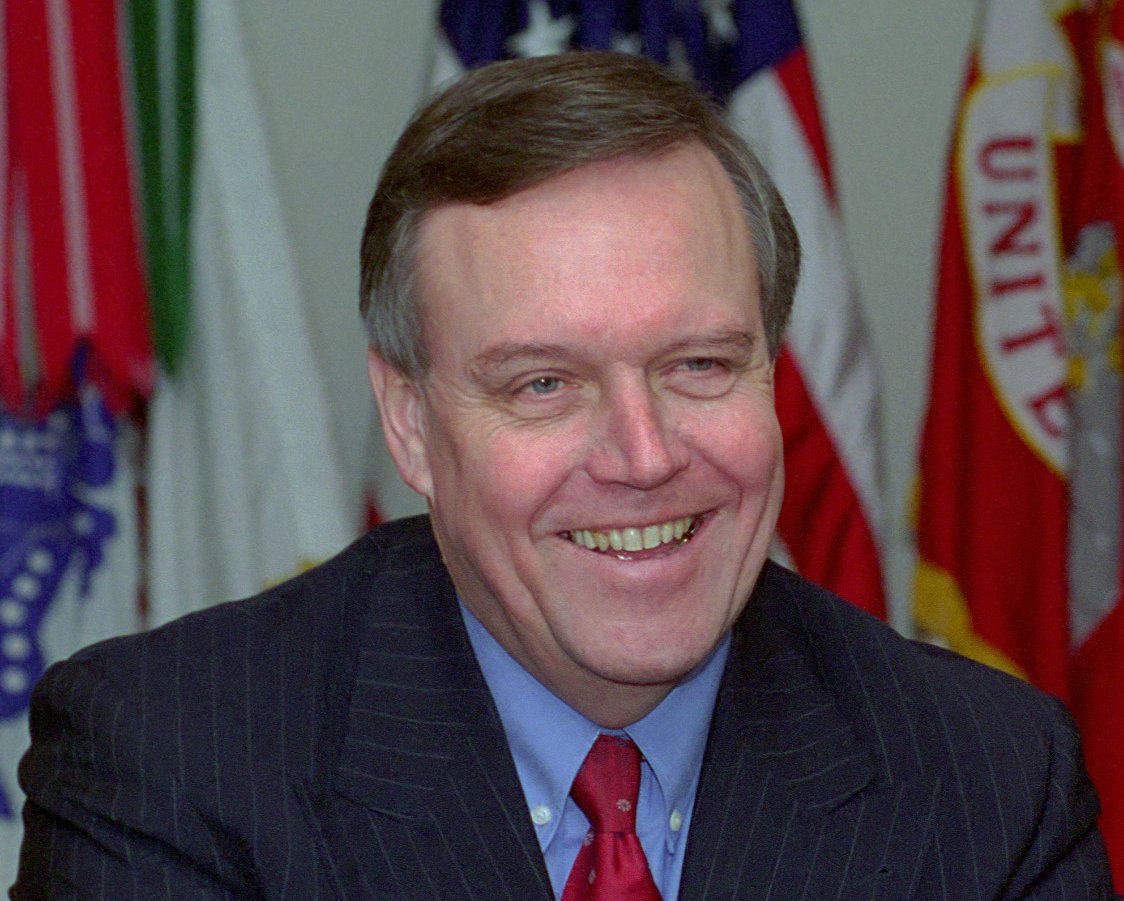

Federal Minister of Defence
- In office 1 April 1992 – 26 October 1998
- Chancellor: Helmut Kohl
- Preceded by: Gerhard Stoltenberg
- Succeeded by: Rudolf Scharping

General Secretary of the Christian Democratic Union
- In office 11 September 1989 – 27 October 1992
- Leader: Helmut Kohl
- Preceded by: Heiner Geißler
- Succeeded by: Peter Hintze

Member of the Bundestag for Hamburg
- In office 14 December 1976 – 18 October 2005
- Constituency: Party List Proportional Representation

Personal details
- Born: 25 September 1942 (age 84) Hamburg, Nazi Germany
- Party: Christian Democratic Union (1963–present)
- Education: University of Hamburg
- Occupation: Teacher

Volker Rühe (born 25 September 1942) is a German politician of the Christian Democratic Union (CDU). He served as German Defence minister from 1 April 1992, succeeding Gerhard Stoltenberg during the first government of a reunified Germany in the fourth cabinet of Chancellor Kohl, to the end of the fifth Kohl Cabinet on 27 October 1998. During his time at the Defence Ministry Rühe played a central role in placing NATO enlargement on the German political agenda. He unsuccessfully ran for the office of minister-president of the German state Schleswig-Holstein in the year 2000, eventually losing against incumbent Heide Simonis.

== Early political career ==
From 1976 to 2005 Rühe was a member of the German Bundestag. After the Christian Democrats returned to power in 1982, he joined the CDU/CSU parliamentary group's leadership under its new chairman Alfred Dregger.

Under the leadership of CDU chairman and Chancellor Helmut Kohl, Rühe held the position of Secretary General of his party from 1989 until 1992, including during the period of German reunification. In this capacity, he succeeded Heiner Geissler and was put in charge of administrative matters and electoral tactics. At a party convention in late 1992, the CDU surprisingly replaced Rühe with Heinz Eggert, a representative from East Germany, as one of Kohl's four deputies.

== Federal Minister of Defence, 1992–1998 ==
As Germany's longest-serving defense minister, Rühe oversaw the country's integration of the former East German army, expanded Germany's role within NATO and was an early proponent of NATO's expansion eastward. He also proposed more spending on defense and won public backing as well as cross-party support for a Bundeswehr role in international peacekeeping, thus overcoming a German aversion to the use of force—in any circumstances—prevalent after 1945.

During his time in office, German military forces were engaged in numerous UN-linked operations outside the NATO region, including 1,700 soldiers in Somalia (logistic support); 122 in Cambodia (medical unit); two ships with combined crews totaling 420 people in the Adriatic Sea (air-navy patrol); 60 in Bosnia-Herzegovina (relief flights), and 40 in Iraq (UN monitoring staff).

Rühe frequently expressed frustration with restrictions on German troops joining international peacekeeping missions, and faced public criticism of the increasing deployment of German military forces abroad. In 1992, the SPD (unsuccessfully) filed a legal challenge in the Federal Constitutional Court, arguing that the deployment of German forces in the Adriatic violated their constitutional limits on their use. Later, Rühe had to inform the German public in October 1993 about the death of Sgt. Alexander Arndt, a 26-year-old army medic; Arndt had become the first German soldier to die on duty in an area of tension since World War II after he was shot by an unknown assailant in Cambodia.

Under Rühe's leadership, Germany began destroying stockpiles of tanks and other heavy weapons in August 1992, becoming the first country to implement the Treaty on Conventional Armed Forces in Europe. After failing narrowly to stop the Eurofighter Typhoon project when he took office in 1992, Rühe negotiated down the number of aircraft the air force ordered, as well as the cost of each. In 1993, he canceled plans to buy Lapas, a $1 billion American-designed high-altitude reconnaissance system, after it was revealed that the system's German subcontractor was at the center of a political scandal about reported bribery of Bavarian Minister-President Max Streibl.

In 1997, Rühe suspended a lieutenant general and instituted disciplinary action against a colonel after it was revealed that Manfred Roeder, a neo-Nazi with a criminal record of bombings, had been invited to give a speech to the country's most prestigious military academy in 1995.

== Later political career ==
Between 1998 and 2000, Rühe served as the chairman of the Committee on Foreign Affairs.

By 2000, Rühe was considered a potential opponent of Angela Merkel for the CDU leadership; however, he eventually dropped out of the race.

In 2004, Rühe from the opposition was named by the government of Chancellor Gerhard Schröder to lead Germany's campaign for a permanent seat on the United Nations Security Council. That same year, Schröder sent Rühe to Moscow for talks with President Vladimir Putin on the Orange Revolution. Between 2014 and 2015, he headed a crossparty committee to review the country's parliamentary rules on military deployments.

== Other activities ==
=== Corporate roles ===
- Boston Consulting Group (BCG), Senior Advisor
- Hamburg-Mannheimer Versicherungs-AG, Member of the Advisory Board

=== Non-profit organizations ===
- International Crisis Group, Member of the Board
- European Leadership Network (ELN), Member of the Advisory Board, Member of the Task Force on Cooperation in Greater Europe
- Atlantik-Brücke Foundation, Member of the Board of Trustees
- German Civil Service Federation, Member

== Political positions ==
=== Domestic policy ===
Domestically, Rühe was an outspoken advocate of tighter immigration laws.

In 2000, as part of the search for a new chair of the CDU, Rühe led an effort to stop frontrunner Angela Merkel that included overtures to Kurt Biedenkopf to serve as an interim leader. Ahead of the party's leadership election in 2018, Biedenkopf publicly endorsed Friedrich Merz to succeed Merkel as chair.

=== Foreign policy ===
In 1985, Rühe strongly urged that Europe's four major powers – France, Britain, Italy and West Germany – formulate a common European position on the Reagan Administration's Strategic Defense Initiative.

In 1995, Rühe withdrew an invitation for his Moscow counterpart, Pavel Grachev, to visit Germany after Grachev insulted leading critics of the war in Chechnya. At the time, this was regarded as throwing into question German-Russian military cooperation on European security issues following the country's reunification. During the Grozny ballistic missile attack in 1999, Rühe called for freezing Western loans to Russia.

In 2010, Rühe wrote an open letter explaining the strategy of including Russia into NATO to counter balance asian powers.

In 2013, Rühe appeared alongside Russian President Vladimir Putin and François Fillon at the Valdai Discussion Club. He was quoted by Neue Presse expressing sympathy for Putin and arguing for an intensive dialogue between the German government and "the Kremlin" on the subject of the American proposed "missile defense system". "We are talking as if Iran already had nuclear weapons... we can't continue with deterrence, like during the Cold War." In 2015, he joined other foreign policy experts, including Igor Ivanov and Ana Palacio, in calling for a possible Memorandum of Understanding between NATO and the Russian Federation on the Rules of Behaviour for the Safety of Air and Maritime Encounters between the two sides.

In a 2019 interview, Rühe blamed his successor Karl-Theodor zu Guttenberg for "having destroyed the Bundeswehr".

Political offices
Preceded by Gerhard Stoltenberg	Federal Minister of Defence (Germany); 1992 – 1998	Succeeded by Rudolf Scharping
