= Günter Rexrodt =

German politician

- Rexrodt in 2002

Minister for Economic Affairs
- In office 21 January 1993 – 26 October 1998
- Chancellor: Helmut Kohl
- Preceded by: Jürgen Möllemann
- Succeeded by: Werner Müller (Economics and Technology)

Member of the Treuhandanstalt Board of Directors for agriculture, construction industry and GDR foreign trade companies
- In office 1 September 1991 – 20 January 1993
- President: Birgit Breuel
- Preceded by: Position established
- Succeeded by: Position abolished

Senator of Finance of Berlin
- In office 18 April 1985 – 16 March 1989
- Governing Mayor: Eberhard Diepgen
- Preceded by: Gerhard Kunz
- Succeeded by: Norbert Meisner
Parliamentary constituencies
Member of the Bundestag for Berlin
In office 10 November 1994 – 19 August 2004
Preceded by	Wolfgang Lüder
Succeeded by	Hellmut Königshaus
Constituency	Free Democratic Party List
Member of the Berlin House of Representatives
In office 29 November 2001 – 22 January 2002
Preceded by	multi-member district
Succeeded by	Christoph Meyer
Constituency	Free Democratic Party List

Personal details
- Born: September 12, 1941 Berlin, Nazi Germany
- Died: August 19, 2004 (aged 62)
- Education: Free University Berlin

Günter Rexrodt (German pronunciation: [ˈɡʏntɐ ˈʁɛksʁoːt]; 12 September 1941 – 19 August 2004) was a German politician of the Free Democratic Party (FDP) who served as Federal Minister for Economic Affairs in the fourth and fifth governments of Chancellor Helmut Kohl from 1993 to 1998. He lived in Berlin.

== Early life and education ==
After the Abitur in 1960 in Arnstadt, Thuringia and an extra year in West Berlin, Rexrodt graduated with a Diplom in business studies from the Free University Berlin where he also received his doctorate ("Dr. rer. pol") in 1971.

== Career in the public sector ==
From 1968 to 1979 Rexroth worked for the chamber of commerce in Berlin. From 1979 to 1982 he worked as a ressort manager at "Office for Economy of the Federal State of Berlin".

In 1980, Rexrodt became a member of the FDP. From 1983 to 1987 – under the leadership of Walter Rasch – as well as from 1989 to 1994 – under Carola von Braun – he served as the alternate chair of the party in Berlin.

From 1982 to 1985 Rexrodt served as the State Secretary in the State Administration for Economic Affairs under Elmar Pieroth. From 1985 to 1989 he was the State Minister (Senator) for Economic Affairs of the federal state of Berlin, which was led by Governing Mayor Eberhard Diepgen.

== Career in the private sector ==
From April 1989 Rexrodt worked for Citibank in New York City and from January 1990 to August 1991 he was a member of the board of directors at Citibank's Germany business, based in Frankfurt.

Already in September 1991, Rexrodt moved to the Treuhand in Germany, where he was a member of the board of directors until January 1993. Reportedly, Chancellor Kohl personally phoned John S. Reed, chairman of Citibank in New York, to ask that Rexrodt be let out of his contract to assume a seat on the board of the Treuhandanstalt. During his time at the Treuhandanstalt, he was in charge of privatizing Eastern Germany's textiles and agricultural sectors. He also disposed of the property of the former Socialist Unity Party of Germany, including publishers and real estate interests.

== Return to politics ==
=== Career in national politics ===
From 1991 Rexrodt was a member of the FDP national leadership under the party's chair Otto Graf Lambsdorff. That same year, he was Lambsdorff's nominee to succeed Helmut Haussmann as Federal Minister for Economic Affairs; however, he eventually lost an internal vote against Jürgen Möllemann.

From the 1994 elections, Rexrodt was a member of the German Bundestag. He was returned to the Bundestag from the Berlin list.

=== Minister for Economic Affairs, 1993–1998 ===
On January 21, 1993, Rexrodt was appointed as Federal Minister for Economic Affairs by Chancellor Helmut Kohl, after the resignation of his predecessor Jürgen Möllemann. The appointment was made following a nomination submitted by the FDP; the Free Democratic members of Parliament and the entire national leadership picked him by secret ballot, with 57 out of 97 votes cast.

During his time in office, Rexrodt was considered far less influential in formulating economic policy than Minister of Finance Theo Waigel. In 1995, he was rumoured to be replaced amid a cabinet reshuffle but ended up keeping his position due to internal infighting within the FDP.

Under Rexrodt's leadership, the government liberalized Germany's highly regulated shop hours in 1996, permitting stores to remain open later, until 8 P.M. on weekdays and part of Saturday afternoons.

Also in 1996, Rexrodt resisted U.S. diplomatic efforts to enlist Germany's help in pursuing democratic reform in Cuba, arguing that the Helms–Burton Act's threat of extraterritorial sanctions against non-U.S. firms were the wrong way to promote democratization.

In 1997, Rexrodt – jointly with the European Commission – convened government ministers from about 30 European nations and business leaders for the Bonn Conference on Global Information Networks to define a common strategy for fostering electronic commerce in Europe.

After the 1998 national elections, Rexrodt joined the Budget Committee and became his parliamentary group's spokesperson on the annual budget.

=== Return to state politics ===
From 2000 to 2004, Rexrodt served as chairman of the FDP in Berlin. In Berlin's 2001 state elections, he was the lead candidate of the FDP. Under his leadership, the FDP returned to the State Parliament with a final voting result of 9.9%. When negotiations over a coalition government with the Social Democrats and Alliance 90/The Greens failed, he resigned his seat in the State Parliament after only two months in early 2002.

From 2001, Rexrodt served as the federal treasurer of the FDP under the leadership of chairman Guido Westerwelle. In this capacity, he was later involved in the investigation of the "flyer affair" surrounding Möllemann.

In 2003, Rexrodt announced his intention to resign as chair of the FDP in Berlin the following year. In 2004, he failed to win sufficient support for his plan to lead his party's Berlin campaign for the national elections again.

== Other activities ==
=== Corporate boards ===
- WMP EuroCom, Member of the Board (from 2000)
- Gerling Group, Member of the Advisory Board
- Skandia, Member of the Board of Directors
- AWD, Member of the Supervisory Board

=== Non-profit organizations ===
- Ghorfa Arab-German Chamber of Commerce and Industry, President
- Global Panel Foundation, Member of the Supervisory Board

== Personal life ==
Rexrodt's father Wilhelm was managing director of the German Democratic Party until 1933. Wilhelm was after 1945 the co-founder of the Liberal Democratic Party of Germany.

Rexrodt was married to Ingrid Hoyermann and had a son from that marriage.

During an official trip to South Africa and Zimbabwe in 1996, Rexrodt was infected with malaria and spent three weeks in a coma. In May 2004 he had to undergo a complicated surgery for cancer on the neck and died shortly after from cardiac arrest.
