= Friedrich Bohl =

German politician

Friedrich Bohl Bundesminister a. D.
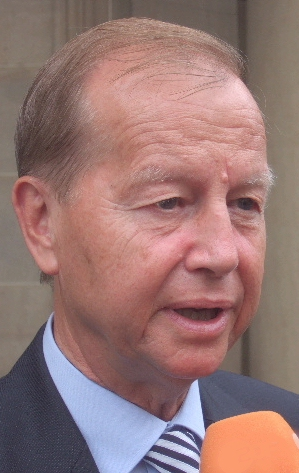
- Bohl in 2008

Head of the Chancellery Minister for Special Affairs
- In office 26 November 1991 – 26 October 1998
- Chancellor: Helmut Kohl
- Preceded by: Rudolf Seiters
- Succeeded by: Bodo Hombach

Chief Whip of the CDU/CSU group in the Bundestag
- In office 25 April 1989 – 25 November 1991
- Leader: Alfred Dregger
- Preceded by: Rudolf Seiters
- Succeeded by: Jürgen Rüttgers

Whip of the CDU/CSU group in the Bundestag
- In office 15 November 1984 – 25 April 1989 Serving with Wolfgang Bötsch, Agnes Hürland-Büning, Ingrid Roitzsch
- Leader: Alfred Dregger
- Chief Whip: Rudolf Seiters
- Preceded by: Rudolf Seiters
- Succeeded by: Jürgen Rüttgers
Parliamentary constituencies
Member of the Bundestag; from Hesse
In office 4 November 1980 – 17 October 2002
Constituency	State list (1980–1983); Marburg (1983–1994); State list (1994–2002)
Member of the Landtag of Hesse; for Wahlkreis 12
In office 1 December 1970 – 4 November 1980
Preceded by	Georg Gaßmann
Succeeded by	Dietrich Möller

Personal details
- Born: 5 March 1945 (age 81) Rosdorf, Germany
- Party: Christian Democratic Union (since 1963)
- Children: 4
- Education: Marburg University
- Occupation: Politician; Lawyer; Notary

Friedrich Bohl (born 5 March 1945) is a former German politician. From 1991 to 1998 he was the chief of the Federal Chancellery and Federal Minister for Special Affairs. He was the member of Fourth Kohl cabinet and Fifth Kohl cabinet. He succeeded Rudolf Seiters on 26 November 1991.

== Early life and education ==
Bohl was born in Rosdorf on 5 March 1945. He graduated in law at the University of Marburg in 1964. He finished the first and second legal state examination in 1969 and 1972 respectively. He was also a research associate at the Institute for Commercial and Economic Law at the University of Marburg.

== Political career ==
Bohl became a member of the CDU's youth union in 1964. From 1978 to 2002 he was the chairman of CDU's Marburg-Biedenkopf district association. He was a member of Bundestag from 1980 to 2002. From 1970 to 1980 he was a member of Hesse Landtag and was the deputy chairman of the place's CDU association from 1978 to 1980. From 25 May to 26 October 1998 he was the head of the Press and Information Office of the Federal Government. After the 1998 election he resigned from the federal government on 26 October 1998. He had also been member of the Konrad Adenauer Foundation and the Bureau of the European Union of Germany. He also served as the first parliamentary secretary of the CDU / CSU parliamentary group. From 26 November 1991 to 26 October 1998 he served as the Federal Minister for Special Tasks and Head of the Federal Chancellery.

He was alleged to have destroyed files related to the party funding scandal during his tenure as the chief of the Federal chancellery. At that time he had taken the political responsibility but denied that he had ordered to destroy the documents. No evidences were found against him in the matter. He has served as the chairman of the supervisory board of the company Hessian craft AG. He was regarded as one of the closest confidants of then-Chancellor of Germany Helmut Kohl, and the phrase "No Kohl without Bohl" was used in German politics.

He had once been called the "man with the oil can", the chancellor's "messenger and adviser, servant and executioner", "sort of prime minister" serving Helmut Kohl and "more equal than his cabinet colleagues".

== Other activities ==
Bohl started practising as a lawyer from 1972. He was ordered to notary in January 1999. From 1998 to 31 March 2009, Bohl was on the Executive Board of Deutsche Vermögensberatung (DVAG) responsible for the areas of Group Secretariat, public relations, associations and law. Since 31 March 2009, he has been Chairman of the Supervisory Board of Deutsche Vermögensberatung (DVAG).

In December 2013 he was unanimously elected the chairman of the Joint Board of the Max Planck Institute for Heart and Lung Research and the William G. Kerckhoff Foundation.

== Personal life ==
Bohl has 4 children.

== Awards ==
- 1990: Decoration of Honour for Services to the Republic of Austria
- 1997: Great Cross of Merit of the Federal Republic of Germany
- 1998: Grand Cross of the Portuguese Order of Merit

== See also ==
- Fourth Kohl cabinet
- Fifth Kohl cabinet

== Bibliography ==
- Schönfeld, Ralf (2011). Bundeskanzleramtschefs im vereinten Deutschland: Friedrich Bohl, Frank-Walter Steinmeier und Thomas de Maizière im Vergleich [Federal Agency Head in a United Germany: Friedrich Bohl, Frank-Walter Steinmeier and Thomas de Maizière compared] (in German). Germany: Stuttgart. ISBN 978-3-8382-0116-0.
