= Robert Tillmanns =

German politician (1896–1955)

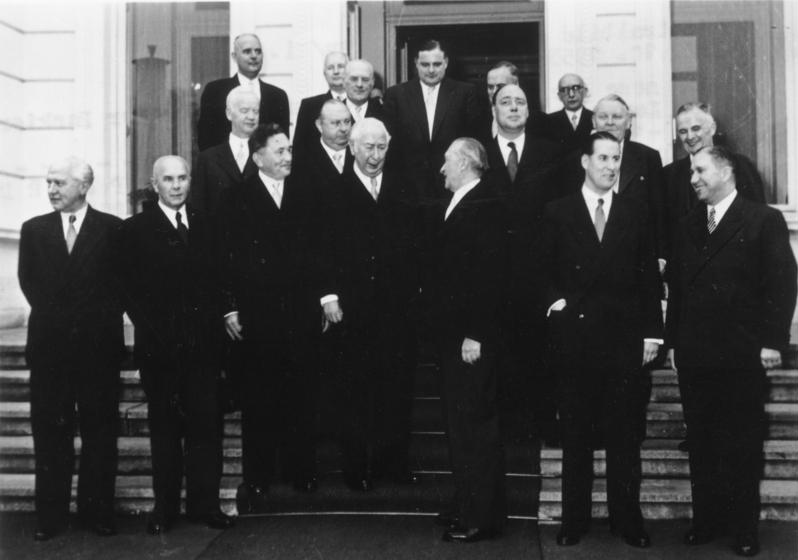
- Adenauer's cabinet II 1953: Robert Tillmanns (above right)

Federal Minister for Special Affairs of Germany
- In office 20 October 1953 – 12 November 1955

Personal details
- Born: 5 April 1894 Barmen
- Died: 12 November 1955 (aged 61) Berlin, Germany
- Party: CDU

Robert Tillmanns (April 5, 1896 in Barmen – November 12, 1955 in Berlin) was a German politician.

From 1953 to 1955 he was Federal Minister for Special Affairs of the Federal Republic of Germany.

== Life and work ==
After the Abitur in 1914, Tillmanns took part as a soldier in the First World War. He studied political science from 1919 to 1921, earning a doctorate at the University of Tübingen. From 1922 to 1930 he served as head of economics at the German National Association for Student Services and in 1925 operated under the umbrella of the German National Academic Foundation. From 1931 he worked as a council member in the Prussian Ministry of Culture, from which he was dismissed for political reasons in 1933. He then worked until 1945 in mining industry management in central Germany. After the war he was Secretary General of the Agency of the Evangelical Church in Germany until 1949. Tillmanns was married to since 1925 Naegelsbach Herta (1904–1995) and had three daughters.

== Politics ==
After the Second World War Tillmanns, together with Jakob Kaiser and Ernst Lemmer, founded the CDU in Berlin and the Soviet occupation zone. From 1949 to 1952 he was first the deputy chairman and from 26 April 1952 until his death chairman of the CDU in Berlin. From 1950 he was a member of the National board of the CDU and the deputy national chairman from 1955. In 1952 he help found the Evangelical Working Group of the CDU/CSU, and was its National Chairman since 1954.

== Parliamentary membership ==
From 1946 to 1947 he was member of the state parliament of Saxony. From 1949 until his death he was Berlin's deputy member of the German Bundestag .

== Public offices ==
After the elections in 1953, Tillmanns was appointed on 20 October the Federal Minister for Special Affairs in the Federal Government led by the Chancellor Konrad Adenauer, and during his tenure was a member of the "Cabinet of Elders" in the Bundestag. He is one of the few federal ministers who have died in office.
