= Fourth Kohl cabinet =

German government from 1991 to 1994

Fourth Cabinet of Helmut Kohl Cabinet Kohl IV
- 16th Cabinet of the Federal Republic of Germany
- 18 January 1991 – 10 November 1994 (until 17 November 1994 as caretaker government)
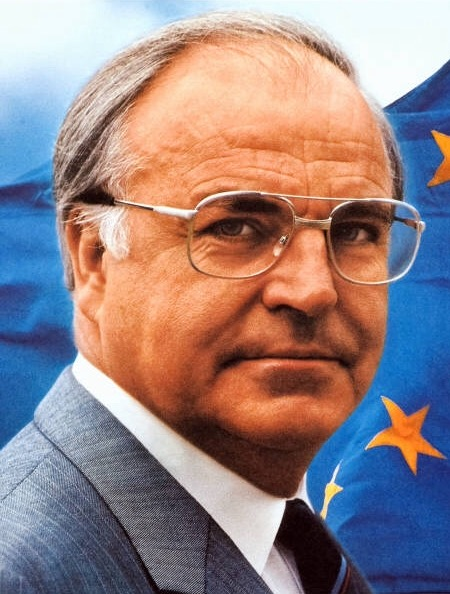
- Helmut Kohl
- Date formed: 18 January 1991
- Date dissolved: 17 November 1994 (3 years, 9 months, 4 weeks and 2 days)

People and organisations
- President: Richard von Weizsäcker (until 30 June 1994); Roman Herzog (from 1 July 1994)
- Chancellor: Helmut Kohl
- Vice-Chancellor: Hans-Dietrich Genscher (until 18 May 1992); Jürgen Möllemann (from 18 May 1992 to 21 January 1993); Klaus Kinkel (from 21 January 1993)
- Member party: Christian Democratic Union; Christian Social Union; Free Democratic Party
- Status in legislature: Coalition government
- Opposition party: Social Democratic Party; Alliance '90 (Until 1993); Alliance '90/The Greens (From 1993); Party of Democratic Socialism
- Opposition leader: Hans-Jochen Vogel (SPD), until 12 November 1991; Hans-Ulrich Klose (SPD), from 12 November 1991

History
- Election: 1990 federal election
- Legislature terms: 12th Bundestag
- Predecessor: Kohl III
- Successor: Kohl V

The fourth Kohl cabinet led by Helmut Kohl was sworn in on 18 January 1991 and laid down its function on 15 November 1994. The cabinet was formed after the 1990 elections. It laid down its function after the formation of the Cabinet Kohl V, which was formed following the 1994 elections.

This cabinet was the first to be formed after German Reunification. Among the East German politicians to enter the government was future chancellor Angela Merkel, as minister of women and health.

== Composition ==
The fourth Kohl cabinet had 19 members.

Cabinet members
Portfolio	Minister	Took office	Left office	Party
Chancellor	Helmut Kohl	18 January 1991	17 November 1994	CDU
Vice Chancellor & Federal Minister of Foreign Affairs	Hans-Dietrich Genscher	18 January 1991	18 May 1992	FDP
Vice Chancellor & Federal Minister of Foreign Affairs	Jürgen Möllemann	18 May 1992	21 January 1993	FDP
Vice Chancellor & Federal Minister of Foreign Affairs	Klaus Kinkel	21 January 1993	17 November 1994	FDP
Federal Minister of Defense	Gerhard Stoltenberg	18 January 1991	1 April 1992	CDU
Federal Minister of Defense	Volker Rühe	1 April 1992	17 November 1994	CDU
Federal Minister of the Interior	Wolfgang Schäuble	18 January 1991	26 November 1991	CDU
Federal Minister of the Interior	Rudolf Seiters	26 November 1991	7 July 1993	CDU
Federal Minister of the Interior	Manfred Kanther	7 July 1993	17 November 1994	CDU
Federal Minister of Finance	Theo Waigel	18 January 1991	17 November 1994	CSU
Federal Minister of Justice	Klaus Kinkel	18 January 1991	18 May 1992	FDP
Federal Minister of Justice	Sabine Leutheusser-Schnarrenberger	18 May 1992	17 November 1994	FDP
Federal Minister of Economics	Jürgen Möllemann	18 January 1991	21 January 1993	FDP
Federal Minister of Economics	Günter Rexrodt	21 January 1993	17 November 1994	FDP
Federal Minister of Labour and Social Affairs	Norbert Blüm	18 January 1991	17 November 1994	CDU
Federal Minister of Food, Agriculture, and Forestry	Ignaz Kiechle	18 January 1991	21 January 1993	CSU
Federal Minister of Food, Agriculture, and Forestry	Jochen Borchert	21 January 1993	17 November 1994	CDU
Federal Minister of Transport	Günther Krause	18 January 1991	13 May 1993	CDU
Federal Minister of Transport	Matthias Wissmann	13 May 1993	17 November 1994	CDU
Federal Minister of Construction	Irmgard Schwaetzer	18 January 1991	17 November 1994	FDP
Federal Minister of Family and Senior Citizens	Hannelore Rönsch	18 January 1991	17 November 1994	CDU
Federal Minister of Women and Youth	Angela Merkel	18 January 1991	17 November 1994	CDU
Federal Minister of Research and Technology	Heinz Riesenhuber	18 January 1991	21 January 1993	CDU
Federal Minister of Research and Technology	Matthias Wissmann	21 January 1993	13 May 1993	CDU
Federal Minister of Research and Technology	Paul Krüger	13 May 1993	17 November 1994	CDU
Federal Minister of Education and Science	Rainer Ortleb	18 January 1991	4 February 1994	FDP
Federal Minister of Education and Science	Karl-Hans Laermann	4 February 1994	17 November 1994	FDP
Federal Minister of Economic Cooperation	Carl-Dieter Spranger	18 January 1991	17 November 1994	CSU
Federal Minister of Environment, Nature Conservation, and Reactor Security	Klaus Töpfer	18 January 1991	17 November 1994	CDU
Federal Minister of Posts and Communications	Christian Schwarz-Schilling	18 January 1991	17 December 1992	CDU
Federal Minister of Posts and Communications	Wolfgang Bötsch	17 December 1992	17 November 1994	CDU
Federal Minister of Special Affairs & Head of the Chancellery	Rudolf Seiters	12 January 1991	26 November 1991	CDU
Federal Minister of Special Affairs & Head of the Chancellery	Friedrich Bohl	26 November 1991	17 November 1994	CDU
