= Thomas Steffen =

German lawyer (born 1961)

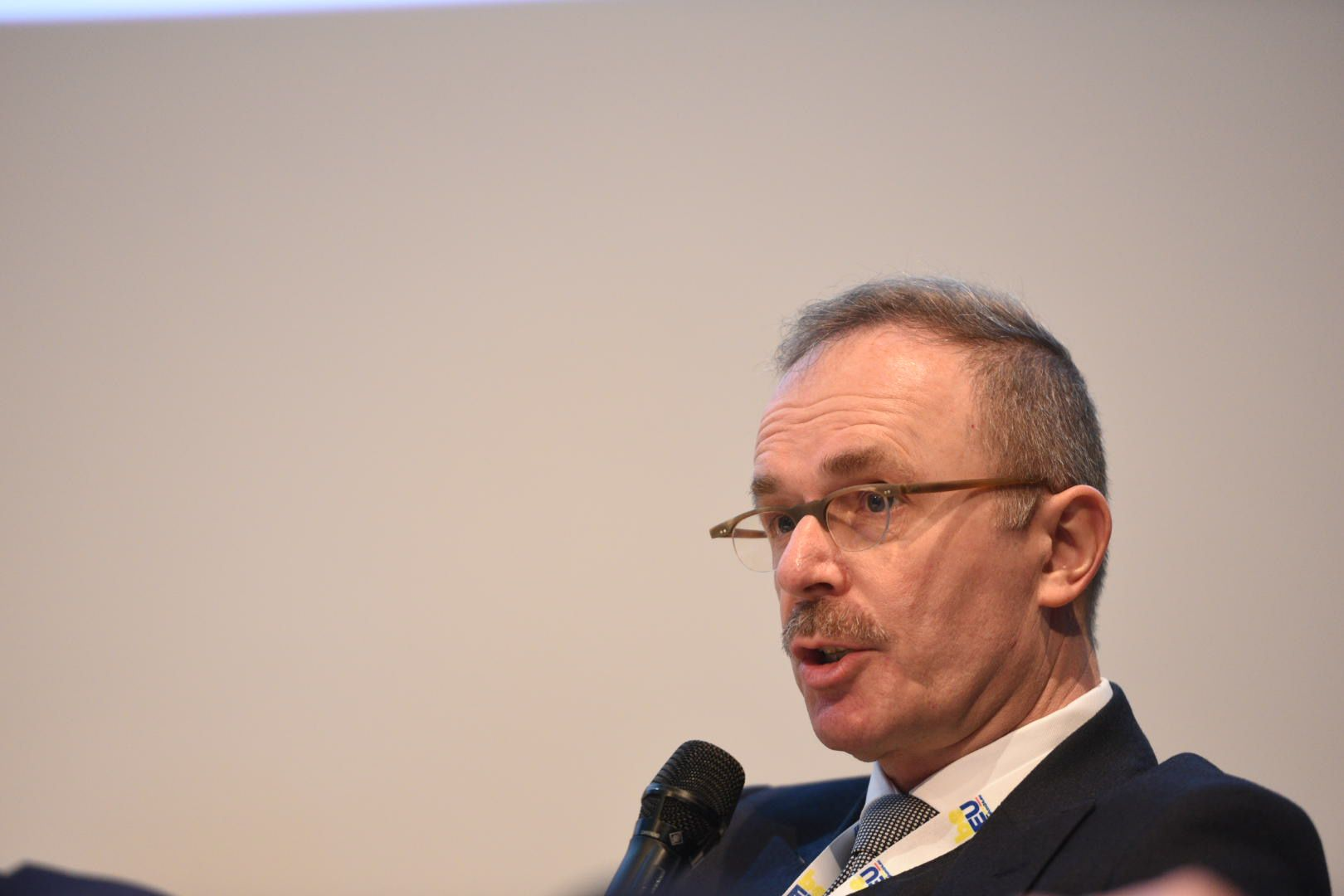
Image of Thomas Steffen

Thomas Steffen (born 1961 in Simmern) is a German lawyer who has been serving as State Secretary at the Federal Ministry for Economic Affairs and Energy in the government of Chancellor Friedrich Merz since 2025.

Steffen previously held the same position at the Federal Ministry of Health under ministers Jens Spahn in the government of Chancellor Angela Merkel (2019–2021) and Karl Lauterbach in the government of Chancellor Olaf Scholz (2021–2025). He also served in various positions in the Federal Ministry of Finance (BMF).

== Education ==
Steffen studied law at the University of Mainz and the University of Burgundy.

== Career ==
From 2002 until 2010, Steffen was a member of the executive board of the Federal Financial Supervisory Authority (BaFin), responsible for insurance and pension fund supervision.

In 2010, Steffen returned to the Federal Ministry of Finance as Head of the Directorate General responsible for European policy.

Steffen was appointed State Secretary at the Federal Ministry of Finance by Minister Wolfgang Schäuble in January 2012, succeeding Jörg Asmussen. He was responsible for fiscal policy and macroeconomic affairs, financial market policy and European policy. In this capacity, he also served as Chairman of the Administrative Council of BaFin, Chairman of the Steering Committee of the Federal Agency for Financial Market Stabilisation (FMSA) and Chairman of the Financial Stability Commission.

Following the announcement of Schäuble and his French counterpart Pierre Moscovici in 2012, Steffen led a working group (alongside Ramon Fernandez) that was to forge joint positions of Germany and France ahead of meetings of the Economic and Financial Affairs Council and the European Council.

Following the 2017 elections, Steffen was replaced by Jörg Kukies.

== Other activities ==
=== European Union organizations ===
- European Stability Mechanism (ESM), Member of the Board of Directors (-2018)
- Committee of European Insurance and Occupational Pensions Supervisors (CEIOPS), Vice Chair (2003–2006) and Chair (2007–2009)
- European Bank for Reconstruction and Development (EBRD), Ex-Officio Alternate Member of the Board of Governors (2012–2017)

=== International organizations ===
- Asian Infrastructure Investment Bank (AIIB), Ex-Officio Vice-chairman (alongside Bambang Brodjonegoro) of the Board of Governors (-2018)
- Financial Stability Board (FSB), Member (-2018)
- Multilateral Investment Guarantee Agency (MIGA), World Bank Group, Ex-Officio Alternate Member of the Board of Governors (-2018)
- International Association of Insurance Supervisors, Member of the Managing Board (2003–2007)

=== Corporate boards ===
- GIZ, Member of the supervisory board of (since 2025)
- Deutsche Bahn, Member of the supervisory board (2014–2015)
