= Fifth Kohl cabinet =

German government from 1994 to 1998

Fifth Cabinet of Helmut Kohl Cabinet Kohl V
- 17th Cabinet of the Federal Republic of Germany
- 15 November 1994 – 27 October 1998
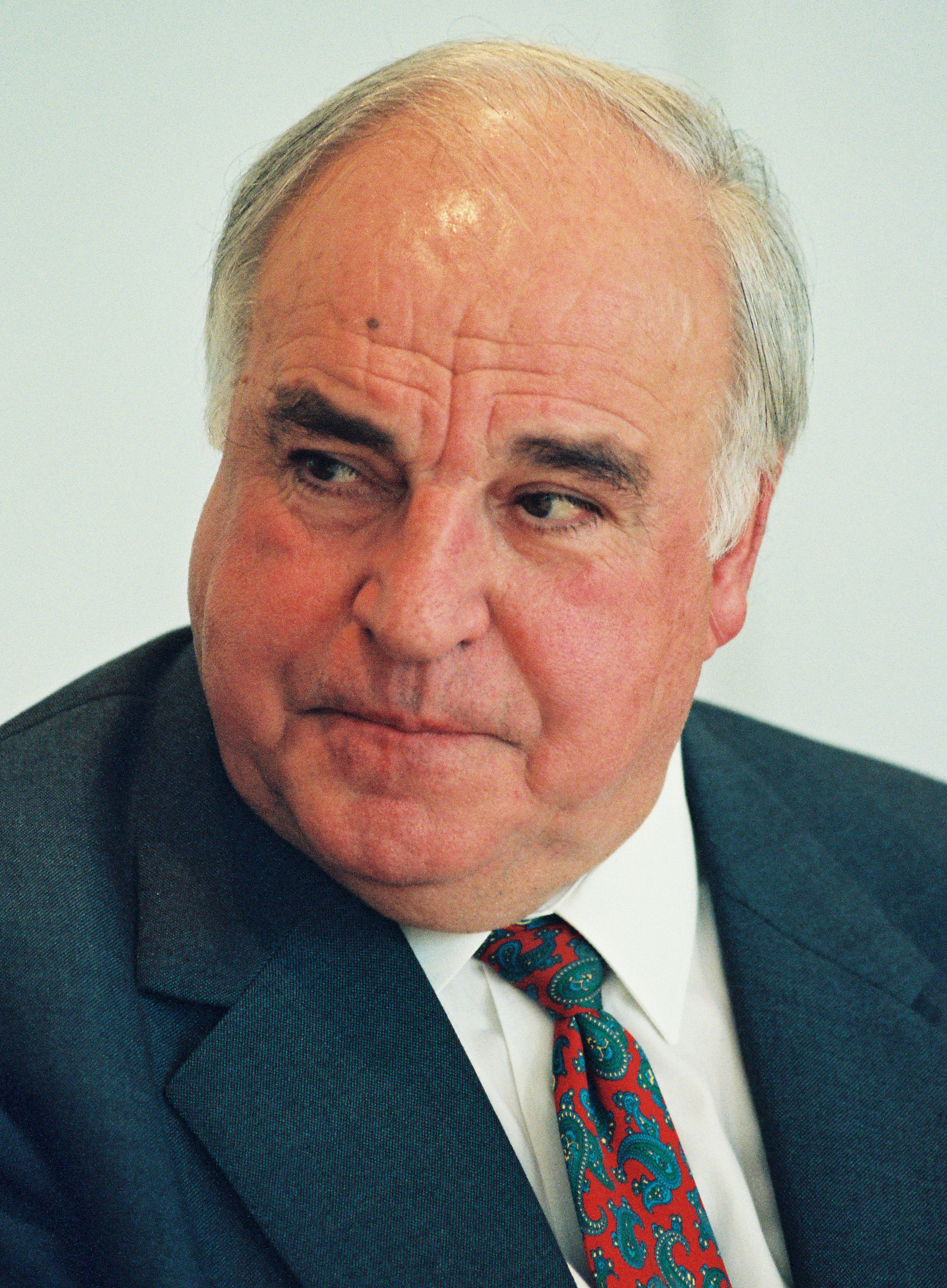
- Helmut Kohl
- Date formed: 15 November 1994
- Date dissolved: 27 October 1998 (3 years, 11 months, 1 week and 5 days)

People and organisations
- President: Roman Herzog
- Chancellor: Helmut Kohl
- Vice-Chancellor: Klaus Kinkel
- Member party: Christian Democratic Union; Christian Social Union; Free Democratic Party
- Status in legislature: Coalition government
- Opposition party: Social Democratic Party; Alliance '90/The Greens; Party of Democratic Socialism
- Opposition leader: Rudolf Scharping (SPD)

History
- Election: 1994 federal election
- Legislature terms: 13th Bundestag
- Predecessor: Kohl IV
- Successor: Schröder I

The Fifth Kohl cabinet led by Helmut Kohl was sworn in on 15 November 1994 and laid down its function on 27 October 1998. The cabinet was formed after the 1994 elections. It laid down its function after the formation of the Cabinet Schröder I, which was formed following the 1998 elections.

== Composition ==
The fifth Kohl cabinet had 18 members.

Portfolio	Minister	Took office	Left office	Party
Chancellor Federal	Helmut Kohl	15 November 1994	27 October 1998	CDU
Vice Chancellor & Federal Minister of Foreign Affairs	Klaus Kinkel	15 November 1994	27 October 1998	FDP
Federal Minister of Defense	Volker Rühe	15 November 1994	27 October 1998	CDU
Federal Minister of the Interior	Manfred Kanther	15 November 1994	27 October 1998	CDU
Federal Minister of Finance	Theo Waigel	15 November 1994	27 October 1998	CSU
Federal Minister of Justice	Sabine Leutheusser-Schnarrenberger	15 November 1994	17 January 1996	FDP
Federal Minister of Justice	Edzard Schmidt-Jortzig	17 January 1996	27 October 1998	FDP
Federal Minister of Economics	Günter Rexrodt	15 November 1994	27 October 1998	FDP
Federal Minister of Labour and Social Affairs	Norbert Blüm	15 November 1994	27 October 1998	CDU
Federal Minister of Food, Agriculture, and Forestry	Jochen Borchert	15 November 1994	27 October 1998	CDU
Federal Minister of Transport	Matthias Wissmann	15 November 1994	27 October 1998	CDU
Federal Minister of Construction	Klaus Töpfer	15 November 1994	14 January 1998	CDU
Federal Minister of Construction	Eduard Oswald	14 January 1998	27 October 1998	CSU
Federal Minister of Family and Senior Citizens	Claudia Nolte	15 November 1994	27 October 1998	CDU
Federal Minister of Health	Horst Seehofer	15 November 1994	27 October 1998	CSU
Federal Minister of Education, Science and Technology	Jürgen Rüttgers	15 November 1994	27 October 1998	CDU
Federal Minister of Economic Cooperation	Carl-Dieter Spranger	15 November 1994	27 October 1998	CSU
Federal Minister of Environment, Nature Conservation, and Reactor Security	Angela Merkel	15 November 1994	27 October 1998	CDU
Federal Minister of Posts and Communications (The Ministry was abolished on 31 December 1997.)	Wolfgang Bötsch	15 November 1994	31 December 1997	CSU
Federal Minister of Special Affairs & Head of the Chancellery	Friedrich Bohl	15 November 1994	27 October 1998	CDU
