= Rudolf Seiters =

German politician

Rudolf Seiters Bundesminister a. D.
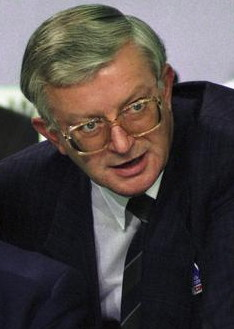
- Seiters in 1989

Vice President of the Bundestag (on proposal of the CDU/CSU-group)
- In office 26 October 1998 – 17 October 2002
- President: Wolfgang Thierse
- Preceded by: Michaela Geiger
- Succeeded by: Norbert Lammert

Minister of the Interior
- In office 26 November 1991 – 7 July 1993
- Preceded by: Wolfgang Schäuble
- Succeeded by: Manfred Kanther

Head of the Chancellery Minister for Special Affairs
- In office 21 April 1989 – 25 November 1991
- Chancellor: Helmut Kohl
- Preceded by: Wolfgang Schäuble
- Succeeded by: Friedrich Bohl

Chief Whip of the CDU/CSU group in the Bundestag
- In office 15 November 1984 – 21 May 1989
- Leader: Wolfgang Schäuble
- Preceded by: Wolfgang Schäuble
- Succeeded by: Friedrich Bohl

Whip of the CDU/CSU group in the Bundestag
- In office 14 October 1982 – 15 November 1984 Serving with Wolfgang Bötsch, Agnes Hürland-Büning
- Leader: Alfred Dregger
- Chief Whip: Wolfgang Schäuble
- Preceded by: Wolfgang Schäuble; Wilhelm Rawe; Dorothee Wilms
- Succeeded by: Friedrich Bohl
- In office 9 November 1971 – 14 December 1976 Serving with Josef Rösing, Leo Wagner, Olaf Baron von Wrangel, Paul Röhner, Gerhard Reddemann, Paul Mikat, Philipp Jenninger
- Leader: Karl Carstens; Helmut Kohl
- Preceded by: Will Rasner
- Succeeded by: Walter Wallmann

Member of the Bundestag
- In office 20 October 1969 – 17 October 2002
- Preceded by: Josef Stecker
- Succeeded by: Gitta Connemann
- Constituency: Emsland (1969–1980); Unterems (1980–2002)

Personal details
- Born: 13 October 1937 (age 89) Osnabrück, Germany
- Party: Christian Democratic Union (since 1958)
- Children: 3
- Education: University of Münster
- Occupation: Politician; Lawyer; Civil Servant

Rudolf Seiters (born 13 October 1937) is a German politician of the CDU (Christian Democratic Union) party.

From 1989 to 1991, he was Federal Minister for Special Affairs and the head of the Office of the German Chancellery. From 1991 to 1993, he was the Minister of the Interior. From 1998 to 2002, he was the Vice President of the German Bundestag, or Parliament. Since 2003, he has been the president of the German Red Cross.

== Life and jobs ==
Seiters was born in Osnabrück. After graduating from the Gymnasium Carolinium in Osnabrück in 1959, he graduated from the University of Münster with a degree in Jurisprudence, finishing his first examinations (roughly equivalent to bachelor's degree) in 1963, and his second examination (professional degree) in 1967. From 1968 to 1969, he was a legal assistant in the office of the Osnabrück Department of the Economy and Social Housing. Since November 2003, he has been the president of the German Red Cross.

He is married with three daughters and lives in Papenburg. In 2000, he was given an honorary doctorate from the University of the Bundeswehr Munich.

== Party ==
Since 1958, he has been a member of the CDU. From 1963 until 1965, he was the Borough-president of the Osnabrück-Emsland chapter of the CDU youth organization Junge Union. Then, from 1965 to 1968, he was the president of the state chapter in Hannover and 1968–1971 of the newly founded Lower Saxony chapter. From 1967 to 1971, he was furthermore a member of the Federal Executive Board of the Junge Union and then from 1971 to 1973 a member of the Federal Managing Board of the CDU itself. From 1972 to 1998, he was the deputy secretary of the CDU in Lower Saxony and from 1992 to 1998 also a member of the CDU National Executive Committee.

== As a representative ==
From 1969 to 2002, Seiters was a member of the German Parliament, the Bundestag. Ih the years 1971–1976 and 1982–1984, he served as an executive officer (Geschäftsführer) of the CDU/CSU parliamentary fraction. From 1984 to 1989, he was the party fraction's Head Executive Officer. After the 1994 elections, he became the deputy chair of the fraction, a position he retained until 1998 when he became Vice President of the Bundestag.

== Prague embassy negotiations ==
In 1989, thousands of East Germans took refuge the Prague embassy of the Federal Republic of Germany. Rudolf Seiters successfully negotiated with the East German government (DDR) the passage of the embassy refugees to the Federal Republic of Germany.

== Cabinet posts ==
Seiters was named on 21 April 1989 as the Federal Minister for Special Affairs and the head of the Office of the German Chancellery. On 26 November 1991, he was appointed the Minister of the Interior. On 27 June 1993, in a German Police raid in the train station of the Mecklenburgian town of Bad Kleinen, both the wanted terrorist of the Red Army Faction (RAF), Wolfgang Grams, and a GSG 9 agent, Michael Newrzella, lost their lives. Seiters took responsibility for the raid and stepped down on 4 July 1993.

== Cabinets ==
Seiters was a member of the Cabinet Kohl III and the Cabinet Kohl IV.

== Awards ==
- In 2008 Dr. Seiters received the Dr. Rainer Hildebrandt Human Rights Award endowed by Alexandra Hildebrandt. The award is given annually in recognition of extraordinary, non-violent commitment to human rights.
