= Martin Grüner =

German politician (1929–2018)

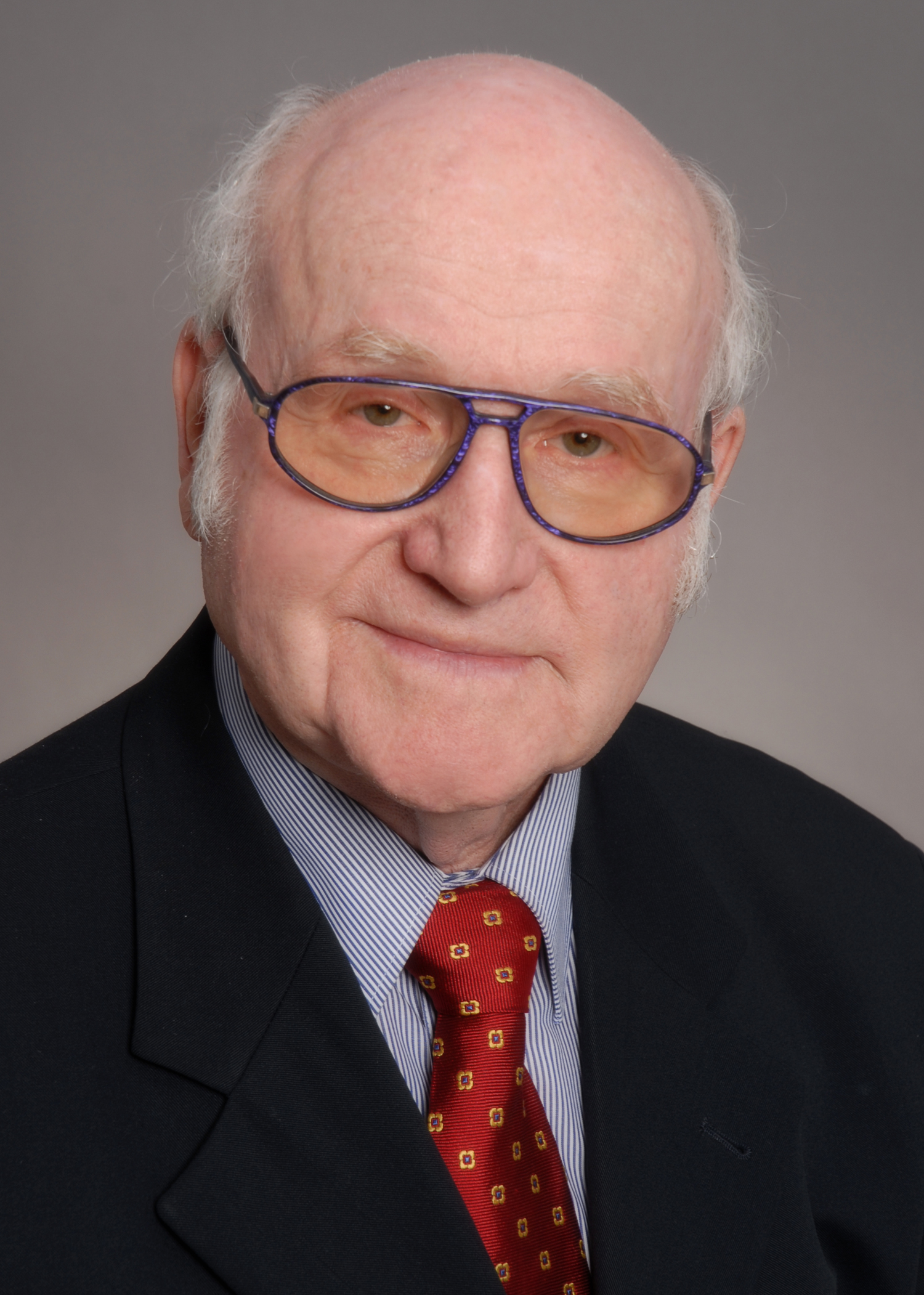
Martin Grüner in 2007.

Martin Grüner (19 July 1929 – 4 February 2018) was a German politician and member of the Free Democratic Party (FDP). Hailing from Schramberg, he was Parliamentary Secretary at the Economics Ministry from 1972 to 1987 and then Parliamentary Secretary at the Environment Ministry until 1991.
