= Werner Müller (politician) =

German manager and politician (1946–2019)

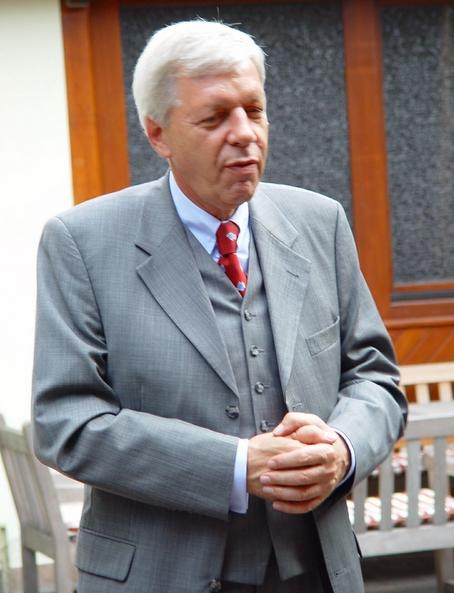

Federal Minister of Economic Affairs and Energy
- In office 27 October 1998 – 22 October 2002
- Preceded by: Günter Rexrodt
- Succeeded by: Wolfgang Clement

Personal details
- Born: Wilhelm Werner Müller; 1 June 1946 Essen, North Rhine-Westphalia, Germany
- Died: 15 July 2019 (aged 73) Essen
- Political party: Independent
- Profession: Manager
- Awards: Manager of the Year; Order of Merit of the Federal Republic of Germany; Order of Merit of North Rhine-Westphalia

Wilhelm Werner Müller (1 June 1946 – 15 July 2019) was a German businessman and politician. He served as Federal Minister for Economic Affairs and Energy from 1998 to 2002. He then became CEO of RAG AG from 2003, of which Evonik was derived in 2007. His management of a reduction in Germany's dependence on coal in a socially responsible way won him the Manager of the Year award in Germany in 2008. He was chairman of the supervisory board of Deutsche Bahn.

== Career ==
Born in Essen, Müller attended the Windthorst-Gymnasium in Meppen, completing his Abitur in 1965. He studied in Mannheim, both national economy and piano at the Musikhochschule Mannheim. He later studied philosophy and linguistics in Duisburg and Bremen.

Müller worked from 1973 for RWE. In 1979, he moved to VEBA, which became part of E.ON in 2002.

As a politician, Müller, who belonged to no party, served as Federal Minister for Economic Affairs and Energy from 1998 to 2002, when Gerhard Schröder (SPD) was Chancellor. After the 1998 German federal election, Schröder made him minister, after the designated candidate, Jost Stollmann had turned down the position because the responsibilities of the ministry were being reduced. When Oskar Lafontaine resigned in 1999, Müller was also temporarily appointed as the Minister of Finance. Müller worked towards a first nuclear power phase-out (Ausstieg aus der Atomenergie) in Germany, in negotiations with the industries.

Müller was CEO of the RAG AG, the former Ruhrkohle AG, from 2003. In 2007, the company became Evonik, now with a focus on chemistry, energy and real estate. According to former employer Evonik and German President Horst Köhler, Müller managed a reduction in Germany's dependence on coal (Ausstieg aus der Kohleenergie) as an energy source, trying to mitigate the issues caused by this fuel, namely damage to the environment and the large subsidies needed in mining, in a socially responsible way. As CEO of the RAG-Stiftung, he organised a reduction of the environmental damage mining had caused. For these activities, Manager Magazin selected him as Manager of the Year (Germany) in Germany in 2008. That year, he moved from CEO of Evonik to chairman of its supervisory board. Müller held the same position for Deutsche Bahn from 2005 to 2010.

Müller was a member of the supervisory board of Borussia Dortmund. He was instrumental in the successful application of the Ruhr as European Capital of Culture in 2010, uniting the region.

Müller was married; he and his wife Marion had two children. In April 2018, he received the Order of Merit of North Rhine-Westphalia for his life's achievements (für sein Lebenswerk) in the presence of Gerhard Schröder. He resigned from all offices in May 2018, due to his cancer illness. He died in Essen on 15 July 2019.

== Legacy ==
In his laudatio for Müller in 2009, awarding the Great Cross of the Order of Merit of the Federal Republic of Germany, President Horst Köhler focused on Müller's ability to speak the language of both politics and economy, and enable dialogue between them. In the matter of nuclear power phase-out, he managed to represent the voters' wishes even though they were not his own view, and he always held constructive discussions with people representing different positions and interests. Köhler mentioned Müller's competence, calm manner, equanimity and dependability. In turning away from coal mining, he created a model of a socially responsible structural transition, with patience and tenacity.

After his death, Schröder acknowledged Müller as a great economic leader who knew the rules of the game of both business and politics, which enabled him to turn opponents to partners. Jean-Claude Juncker, President of the European Commission, noted Müller's enormous expertise, dry humour and calm manner, achieving invaluable benefits for the German miners. Armin Laschet (CDU, Minister-president of North Rhine-Westphalia, called him a visionary, and the founding of the RAG-Stiftung "a genuine work of the century" (ein echtes Jahrhundertwerk).

== Awards ==
- 2008: Manager of the Year (Germany) in Germany, by Manager Magazin
- 2010: Great Cross of the Order of Merit of the Federal Republic of Germany
- 2013: Citizen of the Ruhr as CEO of RAG-Stiftung
- 2015: Honorary doctorate of the University Duisburg-Essen
- 2018: Order of Merit of North Rhine-Westphalia

Political offices
| Preceded by Günter Rexrodt | Federal Ministry for Economic Affairs and Energy; 1998–2002 | Succeeded by Wolfgang Clement |
