= Martin Bangemann =

German politician (1934–2022)

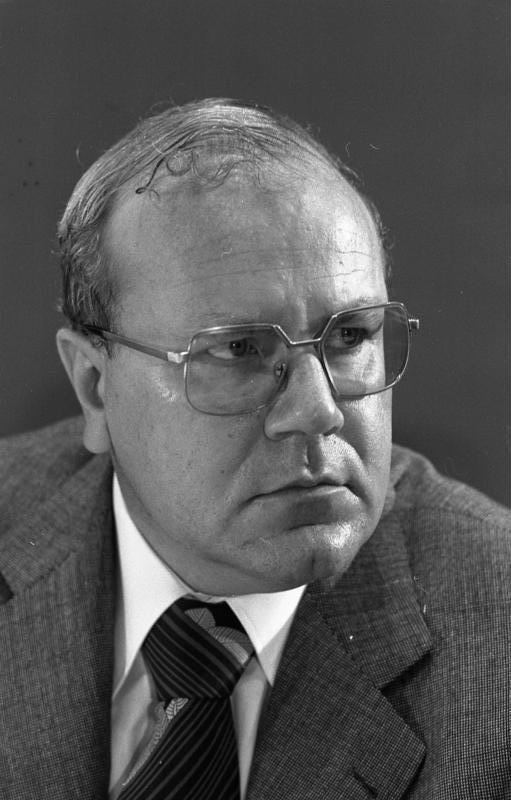
- Bangemann in 1977

Federal Minister for Economic Affairs West Germany
- In office 27 June 1984 – 9 December 1988
- Preceded by: Otto Graf Lambsdorff
- Succeeded by: Helmut Haussmann

Chairman of the FDP
- In office 1985–1988
- Preceded by: Hans-Dietrich Genscher
- Succeeded by: Otto Graf Lambsdorff

Personal details
- Born: 15 November 1934 Wanzleben, Saxony, Prussia, Germany
- Died: 28 June 2022 (aged 87) Deux-Sèvres, France
- Party: FDP
- Children: 5
- Education: University of Tübingen; Ludwig-Maximilians-Universität München
- Occupation: Lawyer

Martin Bangemann (15 November 1934 – 28 June 2022) was a German politician and a leader of the Free Democratic Party (FDP) from 1985 to 1988. He was German Federal Minister for Economic Affairs and a European Commissioner.

== Life and career ==
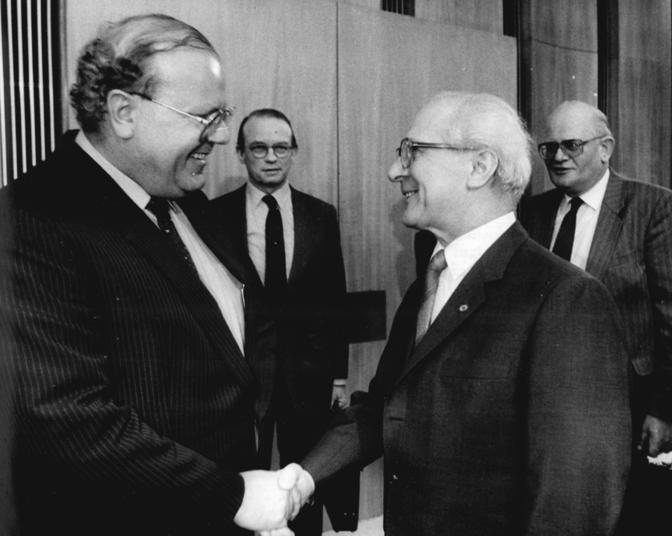
Bangemann (left) with Erich Honecker in Berlin 1986

Bangemann was born on 15 November 1934 in Wanzleben. He studied law at the University of Tübingen and the Ludwig-Maximilians-Universität München, and obtained a Dr. jur. (not equivalent to J.D., but a PhD in law) in 1962 with a dissertation entitled Bilder und Fiktionen in Recht und Rechtswissenschaft (Imagery and fiction in law and jurisprudence). He qualified as an attorney in 1964. In 1963, he joined the FDP. He worked as a lawyer in Baden-Württemberg.

In 1972, he was elected to the Bundestag and briefly was Secretary General of the FDP.

Bangemann was a member of the European Parliament from 1973 to 1984; from 1976 to 1979 he was vice-chairman, from 1979 to 1984 chairman of the Liberal and Democratic Group. From 1978 to 1979 he was vice-chair of the Committee on Budgets.

Bangemann was the German Federal Minister for Economic Affairs from 1984 to 1988. 'During his tenure, he had to deal with high unemployment and the steel, coal and shipyard crises.

In 1988, Bangemann joined the European Commission. He was Commissioner for the Internal Market and Industrial Affairs in the Delors Commission from 1989 to 1995. Subsequently, he became Commissioner for Industrial affairs, Information & Telecommunications Technologies in the Santer Commission from 1995 to 1999.

As commissioner, he led a "high-level group" that drew up the report "Europe and the Global Information Society" in 1994. This document contained recommendations to the European Council on measures that Europe should take regarding information infrastructure. It became known as the "Bangemann report" and influenced many EU policies.

He then moved from European politics to the board of the Spanish group Telefónica. In addition, Bangemann ran a consulting agency.

He was married and had five children.

Bangemann died from a heart attack at his home in Deux-Sèvres on 28 June 2022 at the age of 87.

Political offices
Preceded by ?	German European Commissioner; 1988-1999	Succeeded by ?
