= Federal Minister for Special Affairs of Germany =

Member of the German government without portfolio

Federal Minister for Special Affairs
- Bundesministerin für besondere Aufgaben

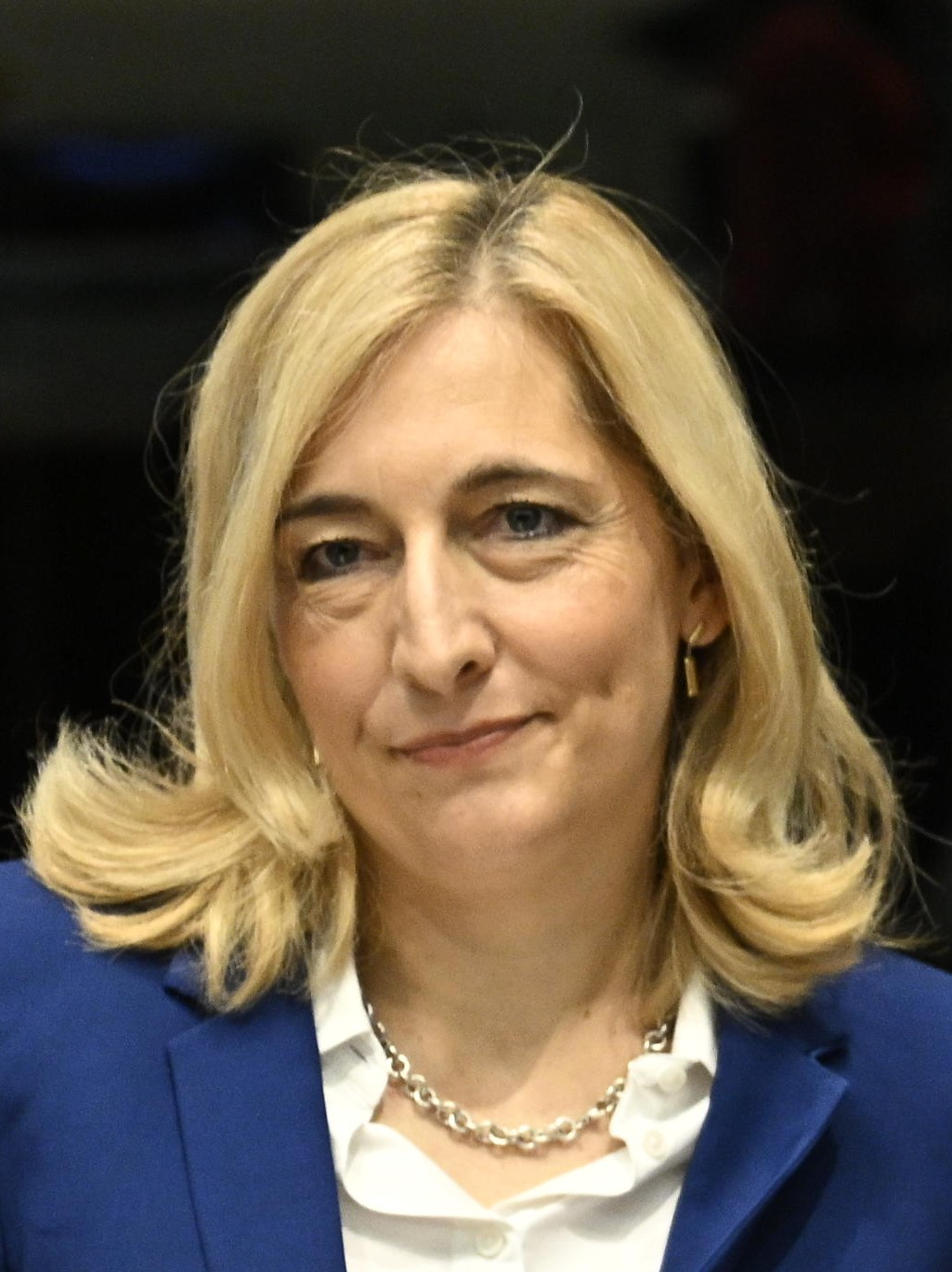
- Incumbent; Nina Warken since 29 July 2026
- Formation: 6 October 1953
- First holder: Franz Josef Strauß

A Federal Minister for Special Affairs (German: Bundesminister für besondere Aufgaben, pronounced [ˈbʊndəsmiˌnɪstɐ fyːɐ̯ bəˈzɔndəʁə ˈʔaʊfˌɡaːbn̩]) is a member of the German government without portfolio.

Ministers for Special Affairs are fully-fledged members of the cabinet, but are not assigned their own ministry. The reasons why a chancellor appoints one or more such ministers to his cabinet can vary and are entirely up to him. In the early days of the Federal Republic, the title was awarded frequently and for very different reasons. For example, Robert Tillmanns, one of the first two Ministers for Special Affairs, represented the federal government in the Council of Elders of the Bundestag. Other responsibilities delegated to different Ministers for Special Affairs included the middle class, water management, the Federal Defense Council or the affairs of the Vice Chancellor of Germany. Since the 1960s, it has become customary to give the Head of the Chancellery cabinet rank by such appointment. However, this is still not obligatory: the head of the Chancellery can also be appointed at the lower rank of State Secretary, which was last done by Chancellor Gerhard Schröder in the case of Frank-Walter Steinmeier (1999–2005).

After the German reunification in 1990, the title was used to integrate some members of the final East German government into the cabinet, in order to provide a representation of the New states of Germany in the federal government.

There is currently one Minister for Special Affairs, Nina Warken (since 29 July 2026), who is also Head of the Chancellery.

== List of Federal Ministers for Special Affairs ==
Political Party: CSU CDU SPD FDP GB/BHE

Portrait	Name (Birth–Death)	Responsibilities	Term of Office			Political Party	Ref.
Portrait	Name (Birth–Death)	Responsibilities	Took office	Left office	Time in office	Political Party	Ref.
1	Franz Josef Strauß (1915–1988)	N/A	6 October 1953	12 October 1955	2 years, 6 days	Christian Social Union	
2	Robert Tillmanns (1896–1955)	represented cabinet in the Council of Elders of the German Bundestag	20 October 1953	12 November 1955 (died in office)	2 years, 23 days	Christian Democratic Union	
3	Waldemar Kraft (1898–1977)	responsible for water management	20 October 1953	12 October 1955	2 years, 23 days	All-German Bloc/ League of Expellees and Deprived of Rights	
4	Hermann Schäfer (1892–1966)	responsible for small and medium-sized businesses	20 October 1953	16 October 1956	2 years, 362 days	Free Democratic Party	
5	Heinrich Krone (1895–1989)	Federal Defense Council questions	14 November 1961	30 November 1966	5 years, 16 days	Christian Democratic Union	
6	Ludger Westrick (1894–1990)	Head of the Federal Chancellery	16 June 1964	30 November 1966	2 years, 167 days	Christian Democratic Union	
7	Horst Ehmke (1927–2017)	Head of the Federal Chancellery	22 October 1969	15 December 1972	3 years, 54 days	Social Democratic Party	
8	Werner Maihofer (1918–2009)	Minister for Vice-Chancellor's Affairs	15 December 1972	16 May 1974	1 year, 152 days	Free Democratic Party	
9	Egon Bahr (1922–2015)	Federal Minister in the Federal Chancellery	15 December 1972	16 May 1974	1 year, 152 days	Social Democratic Party	
10	Wolfgang Schäuble (1942-2023)	Head of the Federal Chancellery	15 November 1984	21 April 1989	4 years, 157 days	Christian Democratic Union	
11	Rudolf Seiters (born 1937)	Head of the Federal Chancellery	21 April 1989	26 November 1991	2 years, 219 days	Christian Democratic Union	
12	Hans Klein (1931–1996)	government spokesman and head of the Press and Information Office of the Federal Government	26 November 1989	20 December 1990	1 year, 24 days	Christian Social Union	
13	Lothar de Maizière (born 1940)	after German reunification	3 October 1990	19 December 1990	77 days	Christian Democratic Union	
14	Sabine Bergmann-Pohl (born 1946)	after German reunification	3 October 1990	17 January 1991	106 days	Christian Democratic Union	
15	Günther Krause (born 1953)	after German reunification	3 October 1990	17 January 1991	106 days	Christian Democratic Union	
16	Rainer Ortleb (born 1944)	after German reunification	3 October 1990	17 January 1991	106 days	Free Democratic Party	
17	Hansjoachim Walther (1939–2005)	after German reunification	3 October 1990	17 January 1991	106 days	German Social Union	
18	Friedrich Bohl (born 1945)	Head of the Federal Chancellery	26 November 1991	27 October 1998	7 years, 283 days	Christian Democratic Union	
19	Bodo Hombach (born 1952)	Head of the Federal Chancellery	27 October 1998	7 July 1999	253 days	Social Democratic Party	
20	Thomas de Maizière (born 1954)	Head of the Federal Chancellery	22 November 2005	27 October 2009	3 years, 339 days	Christian Democratic Union	
21	Ronald Pofalla (born 1959)	Head of the Federal Chancellery	28 October 2009	17 December 2013	4 years, 50 days	Christian Democratic Union	
22	Peter Altmaier (born 1958)	Head of the Federal Chancellery	17 December 2013	14 March 2018	4 years, 87 days	Christian Democratic Union	
23	Helge Braun (born 1972)	Head of the Federal Chancellery	14 March 2018	8 December 2021	3 years, 269 days	Christian Democratic Union	
24	Wolfgang Schmidt (born 1970)	Head of the Federal Chancellery	8 December 2021	6 May 2025	3 years, 149 days	Social Democratic Party	
25	Thorsten Frei (born 1973)	Head of the Federal Chancellery	6 May 2025	29 July 2026	1 year, 84 days	Christian Democratic Union	
26	Nina Warken (born 1979)	Head of the Federal Chancellery	29 July 2026			Christian Democratic Union	
