= Helmut Haussmann =

German academic and politician

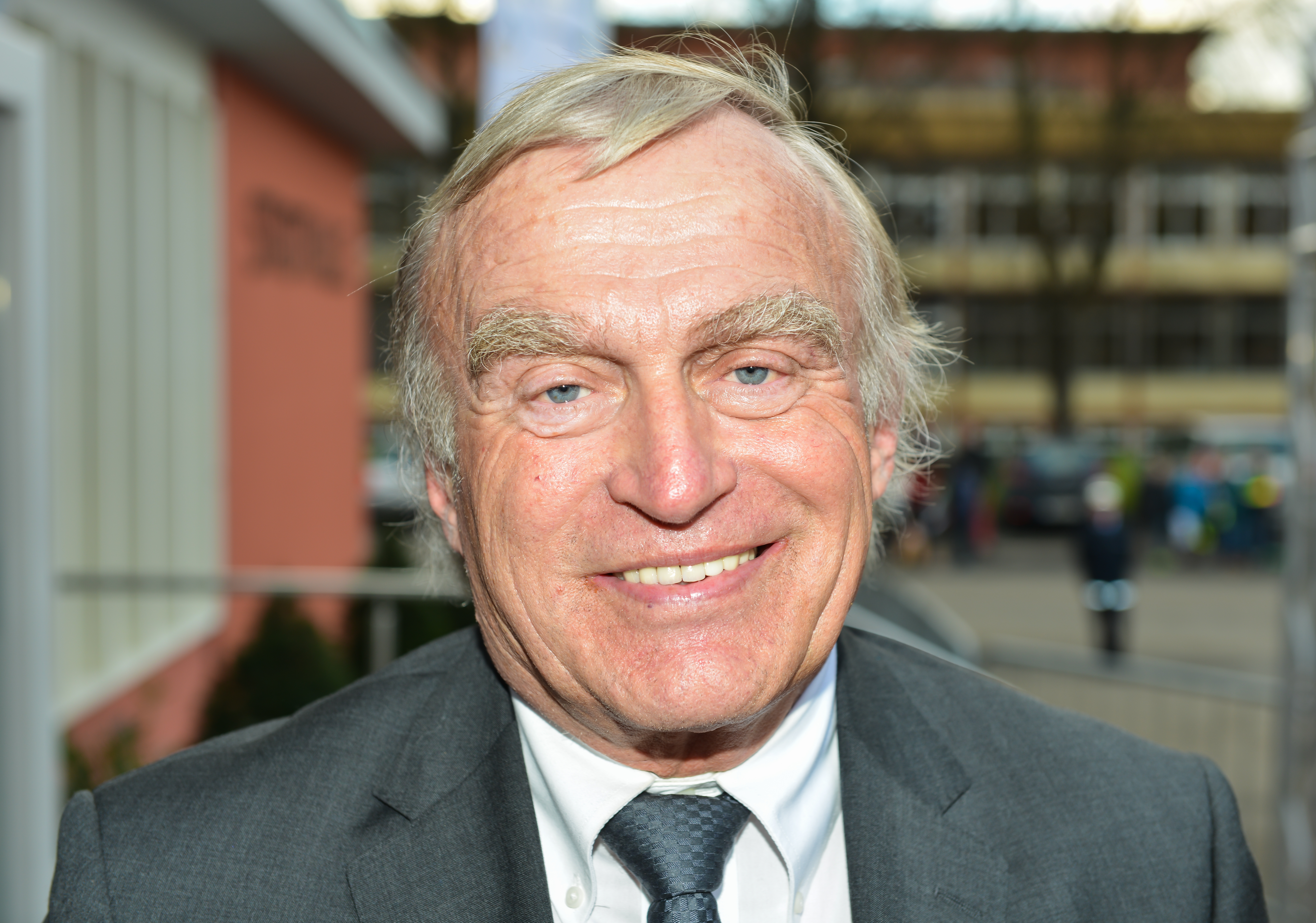

Minister of Economy
- In office 9 December 1988 – 18 January 1991
- Chancellor: Helmut Kohl
- Preceded by: Martin Bangemann
- Succeeded by: Jürgen W. Möllemann

Personal details
- Born: 18 May 1943 (age 83) Tübingen, Germany
- Party: Free Democratic Party
- Education: University of Tübingen; University of Hamburg; University of Erlangen–Nuremberg

Helmut Haussmann (born 18 May 1943) is a German academic and politician. He served as minister of economy from 1988 to 1991.

== Early life and education ==
Haussmann was born in Tübingen on 18 May 1943. He holds a degree in economics and social sciences from the University of Tübingen and from the University of Hamburg. He received a PhD in business management from the University of Erlangen–Nuremberg in 1976.

== Career ==
Haussmann worked in family business in Baden-Württemberg until 1979 when he became a member of the Bundestag in 1976 with the Free Democratic Party (FDP). He was the secretary-general of the party from 1984 to 1988. On 9 December 1988, he was appointed economy minister, replacing Martin Bangemann in the post. Haussmann served in the coalition cabinet led by Helmut Kohl during the reunification process of West and East Germany. Haussmann was reelected to the Bundestag from Baden-Wurttemberg state on 2 December 1990. He resigned from his ministerial post on 4 December 1990, but remained in office until 18 January 1991 and Jürgen W. Möllemann succeeded him as economy minister.

Haussmann became an honorary professor and taught international management at the University of Erlangen–Nuremberg in 1996. In 2001, he was made chairman of the advisory board of GEMINI Executive Search. He is an adjunct professor at the University of Tübingen where he has been teaching international business since 2010.

== Personal life ==
Haussmann is a Protestant. He was criticized due to his lavish lifestyle when he was economy minister and was referred to as the "yuppie minister."
