= Jürgen Möllemann =

German politician (1945–2003)

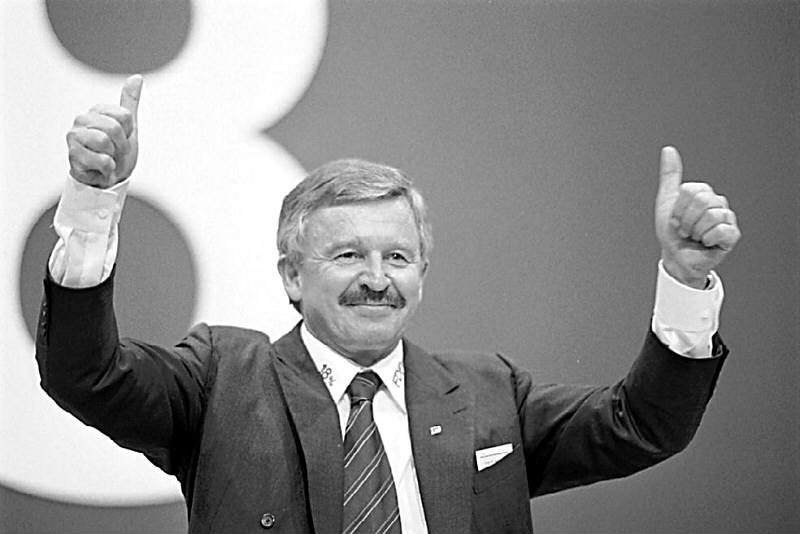
- Möllemann in 2002

Vice Chancellor of Germany
- In office 18 May 1992 – 21 January 1993
- Chancellor: Helmut Kohl
- Preceded by: Hans-Dietrich Genscher
- Succeeded by: Klaus Kinkel

Minister of Economics
- In office 18 January 1991 – 21 January 1993
- Chancellor: Helmut Kohl
- Preceded by: Helmut Haussmann
- Succeeded by: Günter Rexrodt

Minister of Education and Science
- In office 12 March 1987 – 18 January 1991
- Chancellor: Helmut Kohl
- Preceded by: Dorothee Wilms
- Succeeded by: Rainer Ortleb

Leader of the Free Democratic Party in the Landtag of North Rhine-Westphalia
- In office 1 June 2000 – March 2003
- Preceded by: Achim Rohde (1995)
- Succeeded by: Ingo Wolf

Leader of the Free Democratic Party in North Rhine-Westphalia
- In office 1996 – 20 October 2002
- Deputy: Ulrike Flach
- Preceded by: Joachim Schultz-Tornau
- Succeeded by: Andreas Pinkwart
- In office 1983–1994
- Preceded by: Burkhard Hirsch
- Succeeded by: Joachim Schultz-Tornau

Member of the Bundestag for North Rhine-Westphalia
- In office 17 October 2002 – 5 June 2003
- Succeeded by: Michael Kauch
- Constituency: Free Democratic Party List
- In office 13 December 1972 – 5 June 2000
- Succeeded by: Ina Albowitz
- Constituency: Free Democratic Party List

Member of the Landtag of North Rhine-Westphalia
- In office 1 June 2000 – 5 June 2003
- Succeeded by: Daniel Sodenkamp
- Constituency: FDP List

Personal details
- Born: 15 July 1945 Augsburg, Bavaria, Germany
- Died: 5 June 2003 (aged 57) Marl-Loemühle, North Rhine-Westphalia, Germany
- Party: Christian Democratic Union (1962–1969); Free Democratic Party (1970–2003); Independent (2003)

Jürgen Wilhelm Möllemann (15 July 1945 – 5 June 2003) was a German politician of the Free Democratic Party (FDP) who served as Minister of State at the Foreign Office (1982–1987), as Minister of Education and Research (1987–1991), as Minister of Economics (1991–1993) and as the vice chancellor of Germany (1992–1993) in the government of Chancellor Helmut Kohl.

== Early life and career ==
Jürgen Möllemann was born in Augsburg, Bavaria, Germany, on 15 July 1945. He took his Abitur in 1965, served his military service as a paratrooper in the Bundeswehr, and subsequently studied to become a teacher of German, sports and history at the Pädagogische Hochschule (teachers' college) in Münster from 1966 to 1969. He was president of the Deutsch-Arabische Gesellschaft (German-Arabic Society) from 1981 to 1991 and from 1993 until his death in 2003.

Möllemann was initially a member of the Christian Democratic Union (CDU) from 1962 to 1969, but later on became a member of the liberal Free Democratic Party (FDP) in 1970. He was a member of the Bundestag from 1972 to 2000 and again from 2002 to 2003. He was president of the FDP in the state of North Rhine-Westphalia from 1983 to 1994 and again from 1996 to 2002, and also was the chairman of the FDP faction in the state parliament of North Rhine-Westphalia from June 2000 to October 2002.

Under Chancellor Helmut Kohl, Möllemann occupied several cabinet positions in the 1980s and early 1990s. He served as Minister of State at the Foreign Office (1982–1987), as Minister of Education and Research (1987–1991), as Minister of Economics (1991–1993) and as the vice chancellor of Germany (1992–1993). Möllemann left the cabinet in 1993 after facing criticism for using an official letterhead for advertising a relative's business idea (the so-called Briefbogen-Affäre).

In the 2002 federal election, Möllemann produced a flyer criticizing Israeli Prime Minister Ariel Sharon's actions against Palestinians and CDU politician Michel Friedman's endorsement of those actions; the flyer was regarded as antisemitic by some, and the debate surrounding these events led to Möllemann leaving the FDP in March 2003 and resigning his position as party leader in North Rhine-Westphalia; however, he kept his seat in the Bundestag without party affiliation, despite promises to resign from it.

== Death ==
Möllemann, a passionate and experienced skydiver, died on 5 June 2003 in a parachuting incident at Marl-Loemühle. His death was investigated by the Essen district attorney's office, which published a final report on 9 July 2003. While outside interference was ruled out, no definite verdict was reached on whether Möllemann committed suicide or suffered an accident.

Shortly before his death, Möllemann had been confronted with allegations he had been involved in illegal arms dealing and evaded taxes on millions of euros he allegedly earned from those activities. To enable a full investigation on these charges, the Bundestag lifted his parliamentary immunity on 5 June 2003 at 12:28, twenty-two minutes before his death. The tax evasion charges were dropped after his death, while other investigations are ongoing.

== Personal life ==
Möllemann was married to Carola Möllemann-Appelhoff, with whom he had two daughters.

== See also ==
- List of unsolved deaths

Political offices
Preceded by Hans-Dietrich Genscher	Vice-Chancellor of Germany; 1992–1993	Succeeded by Klaus Kinkel
