= Otto Graf Lambsdorff =

German politician (1926–2009)

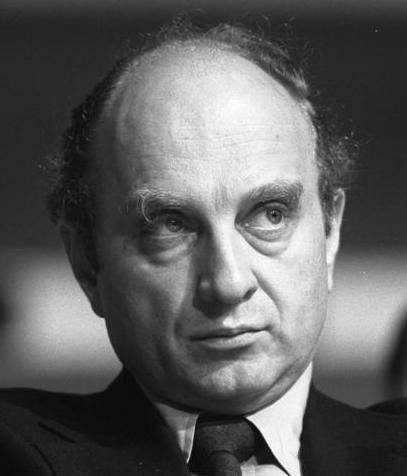
- Lambsdorff in 1978

Federal Minister of Economics
- In office 7 October 1977 – 17 September 1982
- Preceded by: Hans Friderichs
- Succeeded by: Manfred Lahnstein
- In office 4 October 1982 – 24 June 1984
- Preceded by: Manfred Lahnstein
- Succeeded by: Martin Bangemann

Chairman of the FDP
- In office 1988–1993
- Preceded by: Martin Bangemann
- Succeeded by: Klaus Kinkel

Member of the Bundestag
- In office 13 December 1972 – 26 October 1998

Personal details
- Born: Otto Friedrich Wilhelm Freiherr von der Wenge Graf Lambsdorff; 20 December 1926 Aachen, Weimar Germany
- Died: 5 December 2009 (aged 82) Bonn, Germany
- Party: FDP
- Spouse(s): Renate Lepper (1953–1975); Alexandra von Quistorp (1975–2009)
- Children: 3
- Education: University of Bonn; University of Cologne
- Occupation: Lawyer

Otto Friedrich Wilhelm Freiherr von der Wenge Graf Lambsdorff, known as Otto Graf Lambsdorff (20 December 1926 – 5 December 2009), was a German politician of the Free Democratic Party (FDP). He was the German Federal Minister of Economics from 1977 to 1984, when he resigned due to corruption allegations.

== Early life and education ==
Lambsdorff was born in Aachen (Rhineland) to Herbert Graf Lambsdorff and Eva, née Schmidt. He attended school in Berlin and Brandenburg an der Havel and became an officer cadet in the Wehrmacht in 1944. In April 1945 he was severely wounded in an Allied strafing attack and lost his lower left leg. Lambsdorff was a prisoner of war until 1946. After World War II he passed his Abitur and studied law at the Universities of Bonn and Cologne where he obtained a PhD.

== Political career ==
In 1951, Lambsdorff became a member of the liberal FDP, and from 1972 to 1998 he represented this party in the Federal parliament, the Bundestag.

Within and outside his party he was known as a representative of the market liberals; a mocking name was der Marktgraf ("the market count", a play on Markgraf, "margrave").

=== Federal Minister for Economic Affairs ===
When Chancellor Willy Brandt made way for Helmut Schmidt in 1977, Lambsdorff was appointed West German Federal Minister of Economics in the new government and served from 1977 until 1982. He held the same office again from 1982 until 1984 in the government of Chancellor Helmut Kohl after his party pulled out of the coalition with the Social Democratic Party to form a new Government with Kohl's Christian Democratic Union.

In 1987, Lambsdorff became the first West German cabinet minister to be indicted while in office when he was forced to resign over allegations of corruption in the so-called Flick Affair. By January 1987, however, the prosecutor asked the court to acquit Lambsdorff of all corruption charges, including charges he accepted $50,000 between 1977 and 1980 from the Flick concern in return for granting lucrative tax waivers. On 16 February 1987, he was convicted by the Bonn State Court on lesser charges, namely tax evasion on donations to political parties. During the 18-month trial, he won re-election to Parliament and served as his parliamentary group's spokesman on economic matters.

=== Chairman of the Free Democrats ===
Lambsdorff served as chairman of the FDP from 1988 until 1993.

In 1991, during the Persian Gulf war, Lambsdorff joined American officials in voicing anger at the German government, accusing it of moving slowly to prevent some German companies from supplying Iraq with arms and poison gas plants.

Following Hans-Dietrich Genscher's resignation, Lambsdorff and Chancellor Helmut Kohl named Irmgard Schwaetzer, a former aide to Genscher, to be the new Foreign Minister. In a surprise decision, however, a majority of the FDP parliamentary group rejected her nomination and voted instead to name Justice Minister Klaus Kinkel to head the Foreign Ministry.

== Life after politics ==
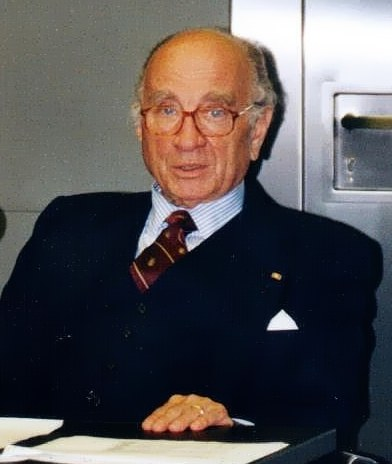
Lambsdorff in 2001

After resigning from active politics, Lambsdorff remained an advocate of free markets, becoming an active figure in the DSW shareholder action group, and regularly warned about the dangers of growing bureaucracy and tax burdens. From 1993 until 2008, he served on the supervisory board of Lufthansa.

In 1999 Lambsdorff was appointed as the federal envoy to the negotiations for the compensation of the victims of forced labor in Germany during World War II by Chancellor Gerhard Schröder, which led to the establishment of the Foundation "Remembrance, Responsibility and Future".

He also served as a member of the scientific advisory board of the Centre Against Expulsions and a jury member of the Franz Werfel Human Rights Award.

Lambsdorff was honorary president of the Liberal International. In this capacity, he personally delivered the World Association of Newspapers' Golden Pen of Freedom Award to Kenyan human rights activist Gitobu Imanyara in 1992, who was banned by his country's authorities from leaving the country.

== Political positions ==
The pro-business Free Democratic Party (FDP) had been in coalition with the social democratic SPD, but changed direction in the early 1980s. Lambsdorff led the FDP to adopt the market-oriented "Kiel Theses" in 1977; it rejected the Keynesian emphasis on consumer demand, and proposed to reduce social welfare spending, and try to introduce policies to stimulate production and facilitate jobs. Lambsdorff argued that the result would be economic growth, which would itself solve both the social problems and the financial problems. As a consequence switched allegiance to the CDU, and Schmidt lost his parliamentary majority in 1982. For the only time in West Germany's history, the government fell on a vote of no confidence.

== Family ==
The Lambsdorff family is of old Westphalian aristocratic descent, but settled for centuries in the Baltic countries and was hence closely connected to Tsarist and Imperial Russia (see Baltic Germans). Lambsdorff's father served as a tsarist cadet in St. Petersburg and the former Russian foreign minister Vladimir Lambsdorff was one of his relatives.

Between 2004 and 2017, his nephew Alexander Graf Lambsdorff represented the FDP in the European Parliament. He has been a member of the Bundestag since September 2017.

Lambsdorff married Renate Lepper in 1953; they had two daughters and a son. He was married to Alexandra von Quistorp from 1975 until his death on 5 December 2009. He is buried at the Stahnsdorf South-Western Cemetery near Berlin. He is survived by all three children.

Political offices
Preceded by Adolfo Suárez	President of the Liberal International; 1992–1994	Succeeded by David Steel
Civic offices
Preceded by Georges Berthoin	European Group Chairman of the Trilateral Commission; 1992–2001	Succeeded by Peter Sutherland
