= List of ministers of the Federal Republic of Germany =

List of past ministers of the Federal Republic of Germany (1945–present)

- Konrad Adenauer, CDU (1949-1963 Chancellor)
- Hans Apel, SPD (1974–1978 Finance, 1978–1982 Defense)
- Walter Arendt, SPD
- Annalena Baerbock, German Green Party (since 2021 Foreign Affairs)
- Egon Bahr, SPD
- Rainer Barzel, CDU (1962–1963 and 1982–1983 Inner-German affairs)
- Norbert Blüm, CDU (1982–1998 Labour)
- Kurt Bodewig, SPD (2000–2002 Transportation)
- Wolfgang Bötsch, CSU
- Jochen Borchert, CDU (1993–1998 Agriculture)
- Willy Brandt, SPD (1966–1969 Foreign affairs, 1969–1974 Chancellor)
- Rainer Brüderle, FDP (2008–2011 Economy)
- Andreas von Bülow, SPD
- Herta Däubler-Gmelin, SPD (1998–2002 Justice)
- Horst Ehmke, SPD
- Björn Engholm, SPD
- Erhard Eppler, SPD
- Ludwig Erhard, CDU (1949-1963 Economy, 1963–1966 Chancellor)
- Josef Ertl, FDP (Agriculture 1969–1982;1982–1983)
- Nancy Faeser, SPD (since 2021 Interior)
- Andrea Fischer, Greens (1998–2001 Health)
- Joschka Fischer, German Green Party (1998-2005 Foreign Affairs)
- Egon Franke, SPD (1969-1982 Inner-German Affairs)
- Hans Friedrichs, FDP (1972-1977 Economy)
- Anke Fuchs, SPD (1982 Youth, family, and health)
- Hans-Dietrich Genscher, FDP (1969–1974 Interior, 1974–1992 Foreign affairs)
- Heiner Geißler, CDU (1982–1985 Youth, family and health)
- Kurt Gscheidle, SPD (Transportation, Postal services)
- Johann Baptist Gradl, CDU (1965–1966 Displaced and Refugees and additionally in 1966 Inner-German Affairs)
- Dieter Haack, SPD (1978-1982 Construction and housing)
- Robert Habeck, German Green Party (since 2021 Economy)
- Volker Hauff, SPD (1978-1980 Science and Technology; 1980-1982 Transportation)
- Helmut Haussmann, FDP (1988–1991 Economy)
- Hubertus Heil, SPD (since 2018 Labour)
- Gustav Heinemann, 1945–1952 CDU; after 1957 SPD (1949–1950 Interior, 1966–1969 Justice, 1969–1974 Bundespräsident)
- Hermann Höcherl, CSU (Interior, later Agriculture)
- Gerhard Jahn, SPD (1969–1974 Justice)
- Manfred Kanther, CDU (1993–1998 Interior)
- Ignaz Kiechle, CSU (1983–1993 Agriculture)
- Kurt Georg Kiesinger, CDU (1966–1969 Chancellor)
- Klaus Kinkel, FDP(1991–1992 Justice, 1992–1998 Foreign affairs)
- Helmut Kohl, CDU (1982–1998 Chancellor)
- Günther Krause, CDU (1990-1991 Special Affairs; 1991-1993 Transportation)
- Oskar Lafontaine, SPD (1998–1999 Finance)
- Manfred Lahnstein, SPD (1982 Finance and additionally Economy)
- Christine Lambrecht, SPD (2019-2021 Justice 2021 additionally Family; 2021-2023 Defense)
- Otto Graf Lambsdorff, FDP (1977–1984 Economy)
- Lauritz Lauritzen, SPD (1966-1972 Housing; 1972-1976 Transportation)
- Karl Lauterbach, SPD (since 2021 Health)
- Georg Leber, SPD (1966–1974 Transportation and additionally from 1969 to 1974 Postal Services, 1974–1978 Defense)
- Sabine Leutheusser-Schnarrenberger, FDP (1992-1996 and 2009-2013 Justice)
- Heinrich Lübke, CDU (1953-59 Food and Agriculture)
- Werner Maihofer, FDP (1972-1974 Special Affairs; 1974-1978 Interior)
- Lothar de Maizière, CDU (1994-1998 Family, Seniors, Women and Youth)
- Hans Matthöfer, SPD (1974-1978 Science; 1978-1982 Finance; 1982 Postal)
- Angela Merkel, CDU (1991–1994 Women and Youth; 1994–1998 Environment, Conservation and Nuclear Safety, 2005-2021 Chancellor)
- Jürgen Möllemann, FDP (1987–1991 education and science, 1991–1993 Economy)
- Claudia Nolte, CDU
- Rainer Ortleb, FDP (1990-1991 Special Affairs; 1991-1994 Education and Science)
- Boris Pistorius, SPD (since 2023 Defense)
- Günter Rexrodt, FDP (1993-1998 Economy)
- Heinz Riesenhuber, CDU (1982-1993 Science and Technology)
- Hannelore Rönsch, CDU (1991-1994 Family and Seniors)
- Volker Rühe, CDU (1992-1998 Defense)
- Jürgen Rüttgers, CDU(1994–1998 education, science, research and technology)
- Fritz Schäffer, CSU (1949-1957 Finance; 1957-1961 Justice)
- Wolfgang Schäuble, CDU (1984–1989 Kanzleramt (Chief of Staff); 1989–1991 Interior; 2009-2017 Finance)
- Rudolf Scharping, SPD (1998–2002 Defense)
- Walter Scheel, FDP (1961-1966 Economic Cooperation; Foreign 1969-1974)
- Karl Schiller, SPD (1966–1972 Economy and additionally 1972–1972 Finance)
- Marie Schlei, SPD (1976-1978 Economic cooperation)
- Helmut Schmidt, SPD (1969–1972 Defense; 1972–1974 Finance; 1974–1982 Chancellor; September 1982 additionally Foreign Affairs)
- Jürgen Schmude, SPD (1981–1982 Justice; September 1982 additionally Interior)
- Olaf Scholz, SPD (2018-2021 Finance, since 2021 Chancellor)
- Rupert Scholz, CDU (1988–1989 Defense)
- Gerhard Schröder, CDU (1953–1961 Interior; 1961–1966 Foreign Affairs; 1966–1969 Defense)
- Gerhard Schröder, SPD (1998–2005 Chancellor)
- Irmgard Schwaetzer, FDP (1991–1994 Infrastructure and Building)
- Christian Schwarz-Schilling, CDU
- Horst Seehofer, CSU (1992-1998 Health; 2005-2008 Food and Agriculture; 2018-2021 Interior)
- Rudolf Seiters, CDU (Interior)
- Carl-Dieter Spranger, CDU
- Gerhard Stoltenberg, CDU (1982–1989 Finance, 1989–1992 Defense)
- Franz Josef Strauß, CSU (1955–1956 Nuclear Energy; 1956–1962 Defense; 1966–1969 Finance)
- Rita Süssmuth, CDU
- Klaus Töpfer, CDU
- Hans-Jochen Vogel, SPD
- Theodor Waigel, CSU (1989-1998 Finance)
- Herbert Wehner, SPD (1966–1969 Inner-German affairs)
- Hans-Jürgen Wischnewski, SPD
- Matthias Wissmann, CDU (1993 Science and Technology; 1993-1998 Transportation)
- Manfred Wörner, CDU (1982–1988 Defense)

== See also ==
- History of Germany
- Politics of Germany
- Chancellor of Germany (Federal Republic)
- President of Germany
- Lists of incumbents
