= Federal Ministry of Post and Telecommunications =

German federal ministry

- Bundesministerium für Post und Telekommunikation

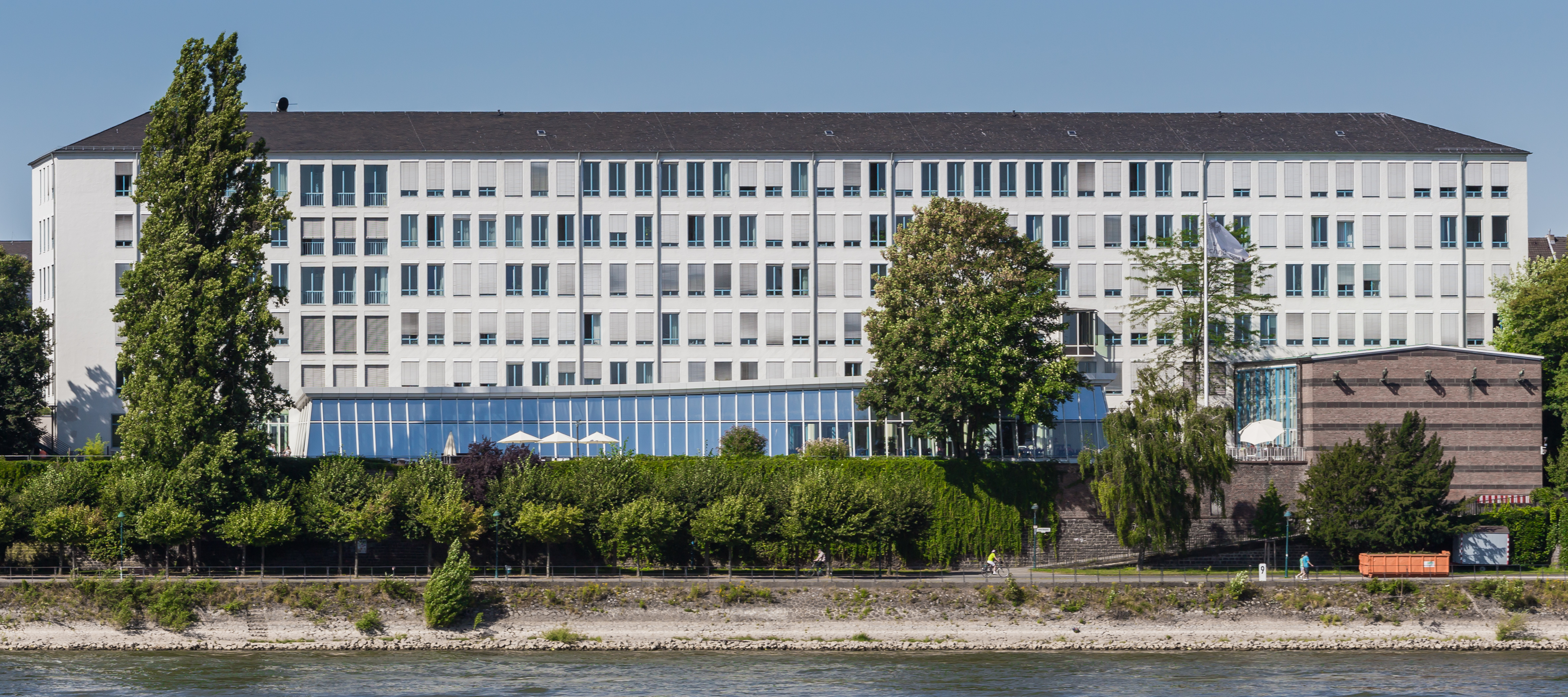
- The former headquarters of the ministry on the banks of the Rhine in Bonn from 1954 to 1988, now the seat of the Federal Audit Office

Agency overview
- Formed: 20 September 1949
- Preceding agency: Reich Postal Ministry
- Dissolved: 31 December 1997
- Superseding agency: Federal Network Agency
- Jurisdiction: Federal Government of Germany
- Headquarters: Bonn
- Minister responsible: See list
- Child agencies: Federal Office for Approvals in Telecommunications; Deutsche Bundespost

The Federal Ministry of Post and Telecommunications (German: Bundesministerium für Post und Telekommunikation) was established in 1949 under the name Federal Ministry of Telecommunications Affairs (German: Bundesministerium für Angelegenheiten des Fernmeldewesens and renamed the Federal Ministry of Post and Telecommunications on April 1, 1950. It was subsequently mostly referred to as the Federal Postal Ministry; within the postal service, the abbreviation BPM was generally used. The ministry was headquartered in the building of the Federal Ministry of Posts and Telecommunications in Bonn from 1954 to 1988, before moving to a new building. In 1989, as part of the first stage of postal reform, the world Telecommunications in the ministry's name was changed from Fernmeldewesen to the more internationally-derived word Telekommunikation.

As a result of the privatization of posts and telecommunications, it was dissolved on December 31, 1997. During its existence, the ministry was the highest authority within the German Federal Post Office. The postal directorates and other central intermediate authorities such as Central Postal Services Office, Central Telecommunications Services Office, Social Welfare Office of the German Federal Post Office were directly subordinate to it.

The Federal Ministry of Post and Telecommunications performed tasks in the field of postal and telecommunications services. It consisted of Policy, Strategy and Targets, Competition Control, Regulation, Licensing, Authorizations, Radio Frequency Matters, Standardization and Central Department.

The Federal Ministry of Posts and Telecommunications's area of responsibility included the following subordinate federal authorities:

- Deutsche Bundespost, headquartered in Bonn;
- Federal Office for Approvals in Telecommunications (BZT) in headquartered Saarbrücken;
- Federal Office for Posts and Telecommunications (BAPT), headquartered in Mainz.

With its dissolution on December 31, 1997, its responsibilities were divided between various agencies: the Federal Ministry of Finance took over the responsibility for issuing postage stamps, exercising voting rights attached to shares, and filling supervisory board mandates in public limited companies and managing the Federal Printing Office. and the Federal Ministry of Economics was responsible for representing German interests in the European Union, international frequency matters with effect from January 1, 1998. Responsibilities relating to the personnel of the former German Federal Post Office were transferred to the Federal Office for Posts and Telecommunications, including, in particular, the related institutions of the former German Federal Post Office such as the Postal Officials' Health Insurance Fund, the Recreation Fund of the German Federal Post Office, or the Postal Clothing Fund and the Accident Insurance Fund for Posts and Telecommunications. The non-sovereign part of the former Federal Ministry of Posts and Telecommunications and the Federal Office for Posts and Telecommunications were merged to form the Regulatory Authority for Telecommunications and Posts, which continues its responsibilities today as the Federal Network Agency responsible for Electricity, Gas, Telecommunications, Posts and Railways.

== Ministers ==
No.	Image	Name	Party	Term start	Term end	Cabinet
Federal Minister for Telecommunications Affairs
1		Hans Schuberth	CSU	20 September 1949	1 April 1950	Adenauer I
Federal Minister of Posts and Telecommunications
1		Hans Schuberth	CSU	1 April 1950	9 December 1953	Adenauer I Adenauer II
2		Siegfried Balke	CSU (from 1954)	10 December 1953	16 October 1956	Adenauer II
3		Ernst Lemmer	CDU	15 November 1956	29 October 1957	Adenauer II
4		Richard Stücklen	CSU	29 October 1957	30 November 1966	Adenauer III; Adenauer IV; Adenauer V Erhard I Erhard II
5		Werner Dollinger	CSU	1 December 1966	21 October 1969	Kiesinger
6		Georg Leber	SPD	22 October 1969	7 July 1972	Brandt I
7		Lauritz Lauritzen	SPD	7 July 1972	15 December 1972	Brandt I
8		Horst Ehmke	SPD	15 December 1972	16 May 1974	Brandt II
9		Kurt Gscheidle	SPD	16 May 1974	28 April 1982	Schmidt I Schmidt II; Schmidt III
10		Hans Matthöfer	SPD	28 April 1982	1 October 1982	Schmidt III
11		Christian Schwarz-Schilling	CDU	4 October 1982	30 June 1989	Kohl I Kohl II; Kohl III
11		Christian Schwarz-Schilling	CDU	1 July 1989	17 December 1992	Kohl III; Kohl IV
−		Günther Krause (kommissarisch)	CDU	17 December 1992	25 January 1993	Kohl IV
12		Wolfgang Bötsch	CSU	25 January 1993	31 December 1997	Kohl IV; Kohl V
