= List of German transportation ministers =

This page lists German transportation ministers. See also lists of incumbents.

== List ==
=== German Reich (1918–1945) ===
Political Party: Centre SPD DDP DVP DNVP BVP KVP NSDAP

No.	Portrait	Name (born–died)	Term of office			Political party	Government	Ref.
No.	Portrait	Name (born–died)	Took office	Left office	Time in office	Political party	Government	Ref.
Weimar Republic (1918–1933)
1	Johannes Bell	Johannes Bell (1868–1949)	13 February 1919	1 May 1920	1 year, 78 days	Centre	Scheidemann; Bauer; Müller I	
2	Gustav Bauer	Gustav Bauer (1870–1944)	2 May 1920	21 June 1920	50 days	SPD	Müller I	
3	Wilhelm Groener	Wilhelm Groener (1867–1939)	25 June 1920	12 August 1923	3 years, 48 days	Independent	Fehrenbach; Wirth I–II; Cuno	
4	Rudolf Oeser	Rudolf Oeser (1858–1926)	12 August 1923	11 October 1924	1 year, 59 days	DDP	Stresemann I–II^{[1]} Marx I–II	
5	Rudolf Krohne	Rudolf Krohne (1876–1953)	12 October 1924	17 December 1926	2 years, 66 days	DVP	Luther I–II^{[2]} Marx III	
6	Wilhelm Koch [de]	Wilhelm Koch (1877–1950)	28 January 1927	12 June 1928	1 year, 136 days	DNVP	Marx IV	
7	Theodor von Guérard	Theodor von Guérard (1863–1943)	27 June 1928	6 February 1929	224 days	Centre	Müller II	
8	Georg Schätzel	Georg Schätzel (1874–1934)	7 February 1929	12 April 1929	64 days	BVP	Müller II	
9	Adam Stegerwald	Adam Stegerwald (1874–1945)	12 April 1929	27 March 1930	348 days	Centre	Müller II	
(7)	Theodor von Guérard	Theodor von Guérard (1863–1943)	30 March 1930	7 October 1931	1 year, 191 days	Centre	Brüning I	
10	Gottfried Treviranus	Gottfried Treviranus (1891–1971)	9 October 1931	30 May 1932	234 days	KVP	Brüning II	
11	Paul Freiherr von Eltz-Rübenach	Paul Freiherr von Eltz-Rübenach (1875–1943)	1 June 1932	30 January 1933	243 days	Independent	Papen; Schleicher	
Nazi Germany (1933–1945)
(11)	Paul Freiherr von Eltz-Rübenach	Paul Freiherr von Eltz-Rübenach (1875–1943)	30 January 1933	2 February 1937	4 years, 3 days	Independent	Hitler	
12		Julius Dorpmüller (1869–1945)	2 February 1937	23 May 1945	8 years, 110 days	Independent	Hitler von Krosigk	
12		Julius Dorpmüller (1869–1945)	2 February 1937	23 May 1945	8 years, 110 days	NSDAP	Hitler von Krosigk	

^{1} The SPD withdrew from the Stresemann II Cabinet on 3 November 1923.
^{2} The DNVP withdrew from the Luther I Cabinet on 26 October 1925.

=== Federal Republic of Germany (1949–present) ===
Political Party: DP SPD CSU CDU FDP

No.	Portrait	Name (born–died)	Term of office			Political party	Government	Ref.
No.	Portrait	Name (born–died)	Took office	Left office	Time in office	Political party	Government	Ref.
Federal Minister for Transport
1		Hans-Christoph Seebohm (1903–1967)	20 September 1949	30 November 1966		DP (1947–1960)	Adenauer (I • II • III • IV • V); Erhard (I • II)	
1		Hans-Christoph Seebohm (1903–1967)	20 September 1949	30 November 1966		CDU (1960–1967)	Adenauer (I • II • III • IV • V); Erhard (I • II)	
2		Georg Leber (1920–2012)	1 December 1966	7 July 1972		SPD	Kiesinger (I); Brandt (I)	
3		Lauritz Lauritzen (1910–1980)	7 July 1972	16 May 1974		SPD	Brandt (I • II)	
4		Kurt Gscheidle (1924–2003)	16 May 1974	4 November 1980		SPD	Schmidt (I • II)	
5		Volker Hauff (born 1940)	6 November 1980	1 October 1982		SPD	Schmidt (III)	
6		Werner Dollinger (1918–2008)	4 October 1982	12 March 1987		CSU	Kohl (I • II)	
7		Jürgen Warnke (1932–2013)	12 March 1987	21 April 1989		CSU	Kohl (III)	
8		Friedrich Zimmermann (1925–2012)	21 April 1989	18 January 1991		CSU	Kohl (III)	
9		Günther Krause (born 1953)	18 January 1991	13 May 1993		CDU	Kohl (IV)	
10		Matthias Wissmann (born 1949)	13 May 1993	26 October 1998		CDU	Kohl (IV • V)	
Federal Minister for Transport, Building and Housing
11		Franz Müntefering (born 1940)	27 October 1998	29 September 1999		SPD	Schröder (I)	
12		Reinhard Klimmt (born 1942)	29 September 1999	16 November 2000		SPD	Schröder (I)	
13		Kurt Bodewig (born 1955)	20 November 2000	22 October 2002		SPD	Schröder (I)	
14		Manfred Stolpe (1936–2019)	22 October 2002	22 November 2005		SPD	Schröder (II)	
Federal Minister for Transport, Building and Urban Development
15		Wolfgang Tiefensee (born 1955)	22 November 2005	28 October 2009		SPD	Merkel (I)	
16		Peter Ramsauer (born 1954)	28 October 2009	17 December 2013		CSU	Merkel (II)	
Federal Minister for Transport and Digital Infrastructure
17		Alexander Dobrindt (born 1970)	17 December 2013	24 October 2017		CSU	Merkel (III)	
–		Christian Schmidt (born 1957) acting	24 October 2017	14 March 2018		CSU	Merkel (III)	
18		Andreas Scheuer (born 1974)	14 March 2018	8 December 2021		CSU	Merkel (IV)	
19		Volker Wissing (born 1970)	8 December 2021	6 May 2025		Independent (FDP until November 2024)	Scholz (I)	
Federal Minister for Transport
20		Patrick Schnieder (born 1968)	6 May 2025	29 July 2026		CDU	Merz (I)	
21		Steffen Bilger (born 1979)	29 July 2026	Incumbent		CDU	Merz (I)	
