= Kiesinger cabinet =

West German government from 1966 to 1969

Cabinet of Kurt Georg Kiesinger Cabinet Kiesinger
- 7th Cabinet of the Federal Republic of Germany
- 1 December 1966 – 20 October 1969 (until 22 October 1969 as caretaker government)
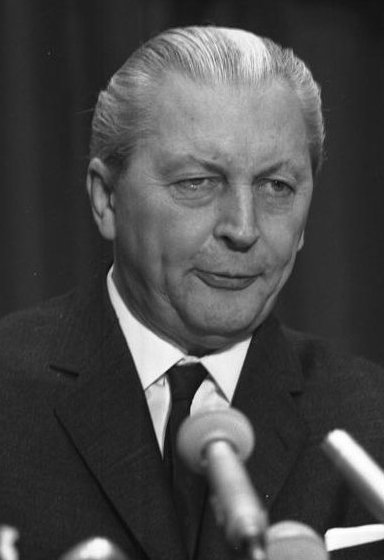
- Date formed: 1 December 1966
- Date dissolved: 22 October 1969 (2 years, 10 months and 3 weeks)

People and organisations
- President: Heinrich Lübke (until 30 June 1969); Gustav Heinemann (from 1 July 1969)
- Chancellor: Kurt Georg Kiesinger
- Vice-Chancellor: Willy Brandt
- Member party: Christian Democratic Union; Social Democratic Party; Christian Social Union of Bavaria
- Status in legislature: Grand coalition
- Opposition party: Free Democratic Party
- Opposition leader: Knut von Kühlmann-Stumm (FDP), until 23 January 1968; Wolfgang Mischnick (FDP), from 23 January 1968

History
- Election: 1965 federal election
- Legislature terms: 5th Bundestag
- Predecessor: Erhard II
- Successor: Brandt I

The Kiesinger cabinet was the 7th Government of the Federal Republic of Germany from 1 December 1966 to 22 October 1969 throughout the 5th legislative session of the Bundestag. It was led by the Christian Democratic Union's Kurt Georg Kiesinger, a former Nazi Party member. The Bundestag that had been chosen in the September 1965 election initially resulted in the Cabinet Erhard II, but when the Free Democratic Party resigned from the government, that led to the formation of the new cabinet. The cabinet was supported by the first grand coalition between the Christian Democratic Union (CDU), Christian Social Union of Bavaria (CSU) and the Social Democratic Party (SPD). The Vice-Chancellor was Willy Brandt (SPD)

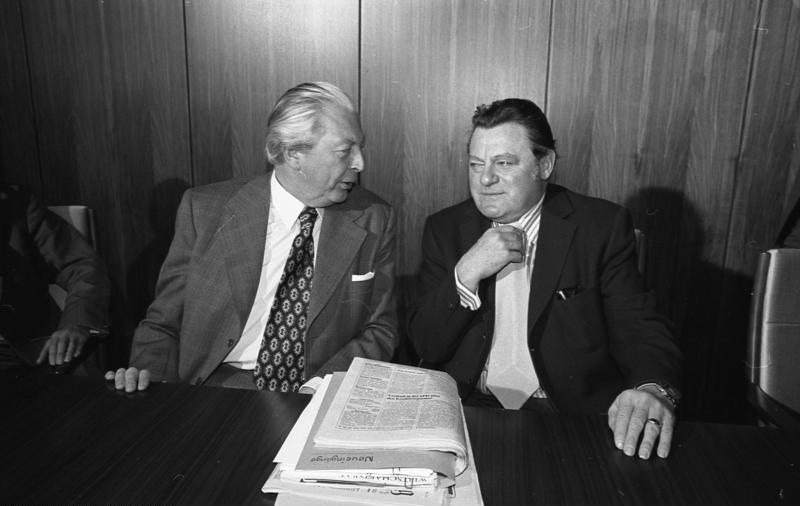
Chancellor Kurt Georg Kiesinger (left) and Finance Minister Franz Josef Strauß (right).

== Composition ==
Portfolio	Minister	Took office	Left office	Party
Chancellor	Kurt Georg Kiesinger	1 December 1966	22 October 1969	CDU
Vice Chancellor & Federal Minister of Foreign Affairs	Willy Brandt	1 December 1966	22 October 1969	SPD
Federal Minister of Defence	Gerhard Schröder	1 December 1966	22 October 1969	CDU
Federal Minister of the Interior	Paul Lücke	1 December 1966	2 April 1968	CDU
Federal Minister of the Interior	Ernst Benda	2 April 1968	22 October 1969	CDU
Federal Minister of Finance	Franz Josef Strauß	1 December 1966	22 October 1969	CSU
Federal Minister of Justice	Gustav Heinemann	1 December 1966	26 March 1969	SPD
Federal Minister of Justice	Horst Ehmke	26 March 1969	22 October 1969	SPD
Federal Minister of Economics	Karl Schiller	1 December 1966	22 October 1969	SPD
Federal Minister of Labour and Social Affairs	Hans Katzer	1 December 1966	22 October 1969	CDU
Federal Minister of Food, Agriculture, and Forestry	Hermann Höcherl	1 December 1966	22 October 1969	CSU
Federal Minister of Transport	Georg Leber	1 December 1966	22 October 1969	SPD
Federal Minister of Construction	Lauritz Lauritzen	1 December 1966	22 October 1969	SPD
Federal Minister of Family and Youth	Bruno Heck	1 December 1966	16 October 1968	CDU
Federal Minister of Family and Youth	Aenne Brauksiepe	16 October 1968	22 October 1969	CDU
Federal Minister of Health	Käte Strobel	1 December 1966	22 October 1969	SPD
Federal Minister of Scientific Research	Gerhard Stoltenberg	1 December 1966	22 October 1969	CDU
Federal Minister of Economic Cooperation	Hans-Jürgen Wischnewski	1 December 1966	16 October 1968	SPD
Federal Minister of Economic Cooperation	Erhard Eppler	16 October 1968	22 October 1969	SPD
Federal Minister of Posts and Communications	Werner Dollinger	1 December 1966	22 October 1969	CSU
Federal Minister of Displaced Persons	Kai-Uwe von Hassel	1 December 1966	7 February 1969	CDU
Federal Minister of Displaced Persons	Heinrich Windelen	7 February 1969	22 October 1969	CDU
Federal Minister of All-German Affairs	Herbert Wehner	1 December 1966	22 October 1969	SPD
Federal Minister of the Treasury	Kurt Schmücker	1 December 1966	22 October 1969	CDU
Federal Minister for Affairs of the Bundesrat of Germany	Carlo Schmid	1 December 1966	22 October 1969	SPD
