= Third Schmidt cabinet =

West German government from 1980 to 1982

Third Cabinet of Helmut Schmidt Cabinet Schmidt III
- 12th Cabinet of the Federal Republic of Germany
- 6 November 1980 – 1 October 1982
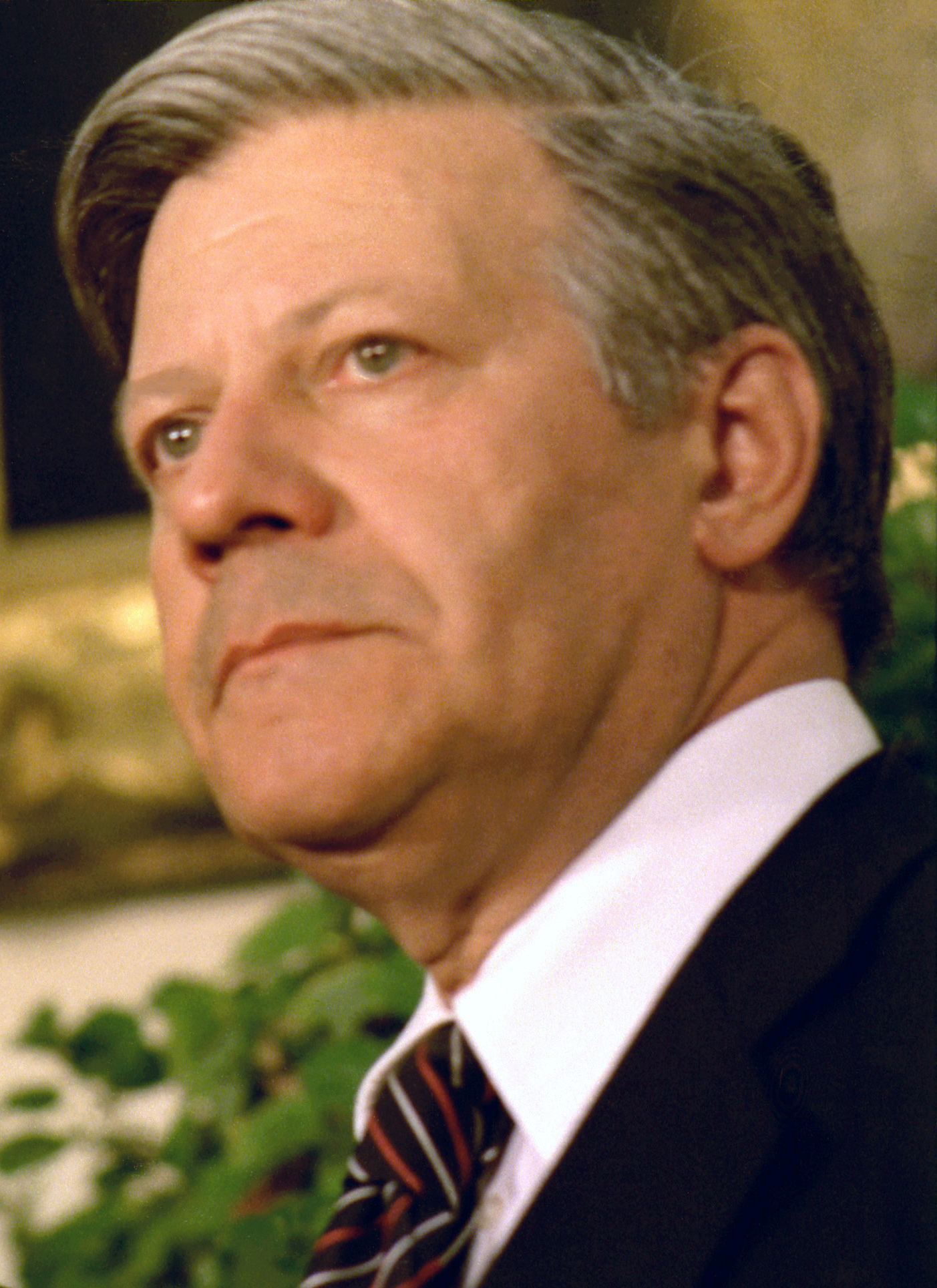
- Date formed: 6 November 1980
- Date dissolved: 1 October 1982 (1 year, 10 months, 3 weeks and 4 days)

People and organisations
- President: Karl Carstens
- Chancellor: Helmut Schmidt (SPD)
- Vice-Chancellor: Hans-Dietrich Genscher (until 17 September 1982); Egon Franke (from 17 September 1982)
- Member parties: Social Democratic Party; Free Democratic Party
- Status in legislature: Coalition majority
- Opposition party: Christian Democratic Union; Christian Social Union
- Opposition leader: Helmut Kohl (CDU)

History
- Election: 1980 West German federal election
- Legislature term: 9th Bundestag
- Predecessor: Schmidt II
- Successor: Kohl I

The Third Schmidt cabinet was the government of West Germany between 6 November 1980 and 1 October 1982, during the 9th legislature of the Bundestag. Led by the Social Democrat Helmut Schmidt. After the 1980 federal election, incumbent Chancellor Schmidt continued the social-liberal coalition between his SPD and the FDP.

In 1982 the coalition collapsed. A first cabinet reshuffle was performed on 28 April, replacing several ministers. The split culminated in the resignation of all FDP ministers on 17 September. Schmidt briefly replaced them with an all-SPD cabinet before being voted out of office in a constructive vote of no confidence in favour of Helmut Kohl, who formed the first Kohl cabinet.

== Composition ==
Portfolio	Minister	Took office	Left office	Party
Chancellor	Helmut Schmidt	16 May 1974	1 October 1982	SPD
Vice Chancellor	Hans-Dietrich Genscher	17 May 1974	17 September 1982	FDP
Vice Chancellor	Egon Franke	17 September 1982	1 October 1982	SPD
Federal Minister for Foreign Affairs	Hans-Dietrich Genscher	17 May 1974	17 September 1982	FDP
Federal Minister for Foreign Affairs	Helmut Schmidt	17 September 1982	1 October 1982	SPD
Federal Minister of the Interior	Gerhart Baum	8 June 1978	17 September 1982	FDP
Federal Minister of the Interior	Jürgen Schmude	17 September 1982	1 October 1982	SPD
Federal Minister of Justice	Hans-Jochen Vogel	16 May 1974	22 January 1981	SPD
Federal Minister of Justice	Jürgen Schmude	22 January 1981	1 October 1982	SPD
Federal Minister of Finance	Hans Matthöfer	16 February 1978	28 April 1982	SPD
Federal Minister of Finance	Manfred Lahnstein	28 April 1982	1 October 1982	SPD
Federal Minister for Economy	Otto Graf Lambsdorff	7 October 1977	17 September 1982	FDP
Federal Minister for Economy	Manfred Lahnstein	17 September 1982	1 October 1982	SPD
Federal Minister for Food, Agriculture and Forests	Josef Ertl	22 October 1969	17 September 1982	FDP
Federal Minister for Food, Agriculture and Forests	Björn Engholm	17 September 1982	1 October 1982	SPD
Federal Minister for Labour and Social Affairs	Herbert Ehrenberg	16 December 1976	28 April 1982	SPD
Federal Minister for Labour and Social Affairs	Heinz Westphal	28 April 1982	1 October 1982	SPD
Federal Minister of Defence	Hans Apel	16 February 1978	1 October 1982	SPD
Federal Minister for Youth, Family and Health	Antje Huber	16 December 1976	28 April 1982	SPD
Federal Minister for Youth, Family and Health	Anke Fuchs	28 April 1982	1 October 1982	SPD
Federal Minister of Transport	Volker Hauff	6 November 1980	1 October 1982	SPD
Federal Minister of Post and Telecommunications	Kurt Gscheidle	16 May 1974	28 April 1982	SPD
Federal Minister of Post and Telecommunications	Hans Matthöfer	28 April 1982	1 October 1982	SPD
Federal Minister of Regional Planning, Building and Urban Development	Dieter Haack	16 February 1978	1 October 1982	SPD
Federal Minister of Intra-German Relations	Egon Franke	22 October 1969	1 October 1982	SPD
Federal Minister of Research and Technology	Andreas von Bülow	6 October 1980	1 October 1982	SPD
Federal Ministry of Education and Science	Jürgen Schmude	16 February 1978	28 January 1981	SPD
Federal Ministry of Education and Science	Björn Engholm	28 January 1981	1 October 1982	SPD
Federal Minister for Economic Cooperation	Rainer Offergeld	16 February 1978	1 October 1982	SPD
