= Second Schmidt cabinet =

West German government from 1976 to 1980

Second Cabinet of Helmut Schmidt Cabinet Schmidt II
- 11th Cabinet of the Federal Republic of Germany
- 16 December 1976 – 5 November 1980
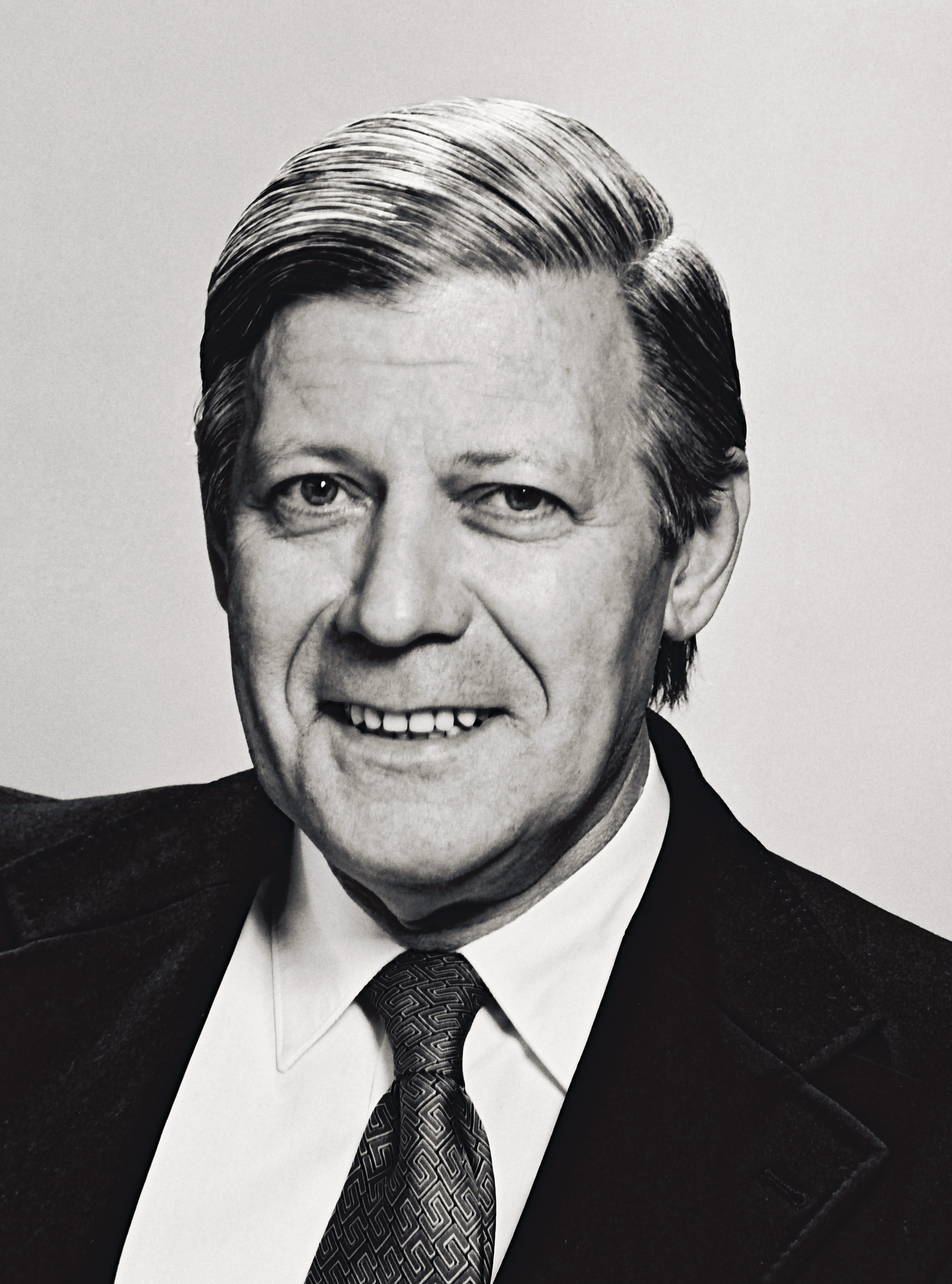
- Helmut Schmidt
- Date formed: 16 December 1976
- Date dissolved: 5 November 1980 (3 years, 10 months, 2 weeks and 6 days)

People and organisations
- President: Walter Scheel
- Chancellor: Helmut Schmidt
- Vice-Chancellor: Hans-Dietrich Genscher
- Member party: Social Democratic Party; Free Democratic Party
- Status in legislature: Coalition government
- Opposition party: Christian Democratic Union; Christian Social Union
- Opposition leader: Helmut Kohl (CDU)

History
- Election: 1976 West German federal election
- Legislature terms: 8th Bundestag
- Predecessor: Schmidt I
- Successor: Schmidt III

The Second Schmidt cabinet was the government of West Germany between 16 December 1976 and 5 November 1980, during the 8th legislature of the Bundestag. Led by the Social Democrat Helmut Schmidt, the cabinet was a coalition between the Social Democrats (SPD) and the Free Democratic Party (FDP). The Vice-Chancellor was the Free Democrat Hans-Dietrich Genscher (FDP).

== Composition ==
Portfolio	Minister	Took office	Left office	Party
Chancellor	Helmut Schmidt	16 December 1976	5 November 1980	SPD
Vice-Chancellor & Federal Minister of Foreign Affairs	Hans-Dietrich Genscher	16 December 1976	5 November 1980	FDP
Federal Minister of Interior	Werner Maihofer	16 December 1976	8 June 1978	FDP
Federal Minister of Interior	Gerhart Baum	8 June 1978	5 November 1980	FDP
Federal Minister of Justice	Hans-Jochen Vogel	16 December 1976	4 November 1980	SPD
Federal Minister of Finance	Hans Apel	16 December 1976	16 February 1978	SPD
Federal Minister of Finance	Hans Matthöfer	16 February 1978	5 November 1980	SPD
Federal Minister of Economics and Technology	Hans Friderichs	16 December 1976	7 October 1977	FDP
Federal Minister of Economics and Technology	Otto Graf Lambsdorff	7 October 1977	5 November 1980	FDP
Federal Minister of Defence	Georg Leber	16 December 1976	16 February 1978	SPD
Federal Minister of Defence	Hans Apel	16 February 1978	5 November 1980	SPD
Federal Minister of Transport & Post and Telecommunications	Kurt Gscheidle	16 December 1976	5 November 1980	SPD
Federal Minister of Food and Agriculture	Josef Ertl	16 December 1976	5 November 1980	FDP
Federal Minister of Labour and Social Affairs	Herbert Ehrenberg	16 December 1976	5 November 1980	SPD
Federal Minister of Youth, Families and Health	Antje Huber	16 December 1976	5 November 1980	SPD
Federal Minister of Intra-German Relations	Egon Franke	16 December 1976	5 November 1980	SPD
Federal Minister of Research and Technology	Hans Matthöfer	16 December 1976	16 February 1978	SPD
Federal Minister of Research and Technology	Volker Hauff	16 February 1978	5 November 1980	SPD
Federal Minister of Education and Science	Helmut Rohde	16 December 1976	16 February 1978	SPD
Federal Minister of Education and Science	Jürgen Schmude	16 February 1978	5 November 1980	SPD
Federal Minister of Economic Cooperation	Marie Schlei	16 December 1976	16 February 1978	SPD
Federal Minister of Economic Cooperation	Rainer Offergeld	16 February 1978	5 November 1980	SPD
Federal Minister of Planning, Architecture und Urban Development	Karl Ravens	16 December 1976	16 February 1978	SPD
Federal Minister of Planning, Architecture und Urban Development	Dieter Haack	16 February 1978	5 November 1980	SPD

== See also ==
- Cabinet of Germany
