= First Kohl cabinet =

West German government from 1982 to 1983

First Cabinet of Helmut Kohl Cabinet Kohl I
- 13th Cabinet of the Federal Republic of Germany
- 1 October 1982 – 30 March 1983
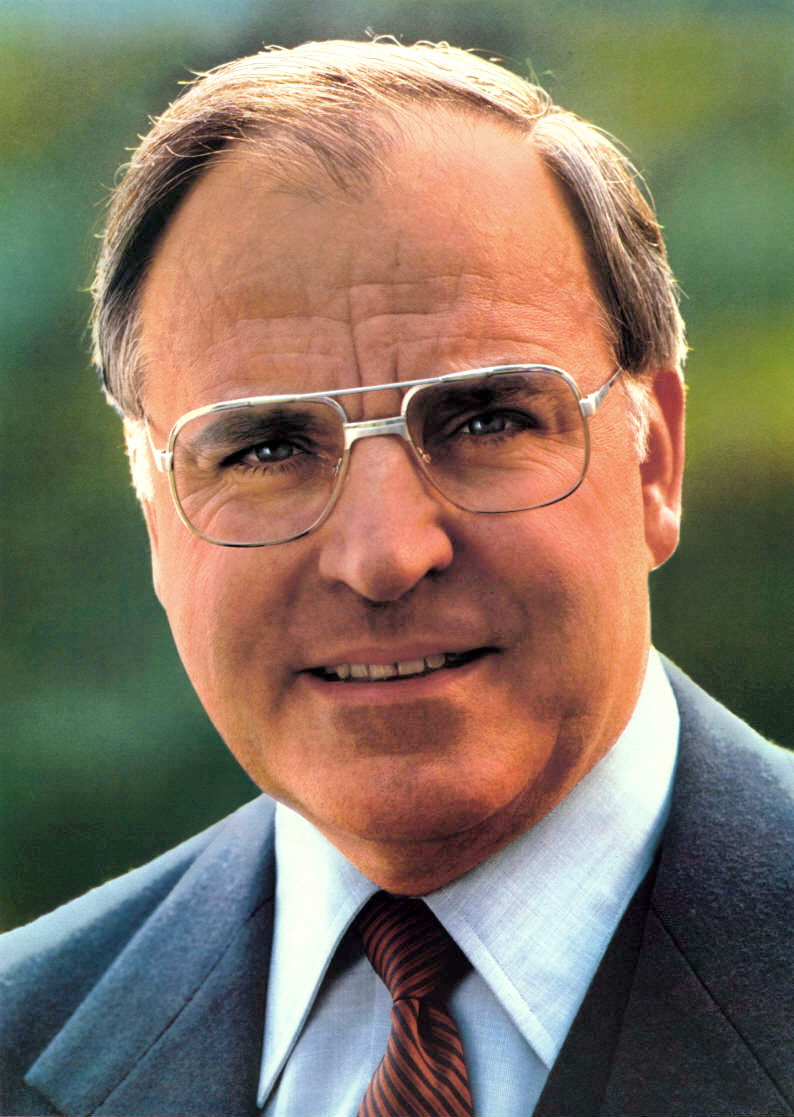
- Helmut Kohl
- Date formed: 1 October 1982
- Date dissolved: 30 March 1983 (5 months, 4 weeks and 1 day)

People and organisations
- President: Karl Carstens
- Chancellor: Helmut Kohl
- Vice-Chancellor: Hans-Dietrich Genscher
- Member party: Christian Democratic Union; Christian Social Union; Free Democratic Party
- Status in legislature: Coalition government
- Opposition party: Social Democratic Party; The Greens
- Opposition leader: Herbert Wehner (SPD)

History
- Election: Constructive vote of no confidence led by Helmut Kohl against incumbent Chancellor Helmut Schmidt
- Legislature terms: 9th Bundestag
- Predecessor: Schmidt III
- Successor: Kohl II

The first Kohl cabinet (German: Kabinett Kohl I) was the 13th cabinet of the Federal Republic of Germany. It was formed on 1 October 1982 following a successful constructive vote of no confidence, by which Helmut Kohl replaced Helmut Schmidt as Chancellor. The other cabinet members were appointed and sworn in on 4 October 1982. It was the first (and as yet only) German federal cabinet formed after a constructive vote of no confidence. After ascending to the chancellorship, Kohl and his coalition sought to bring about new elections as quickly as possible, which he achieved by deliberately losing a confidence motion and then having the Bundestag dissolved by the president at the chancellor's request. The following 1983 federal election on 6 March 1983 resulted in a re-election of Kohl and his newly formed CDU/CSU/FDP-coalition. On 30 March 1983, Kohl was again elected chancellor by the Bundestag and formed his second cabinet. With a duration of just under half a year, the first Kohl cabinet was the shortest-lived German government since the Schleicher cabinet (3 December 1932 – 28 January 1933) during the Weimar Republic and is, as yet, the shortest-lived cabinet in the history of the Federal Republic.

== Composition ==
The first Kohl cabinet had 17 ministers.

Cabinet
Portfolio	Minister	Took office	Left office	Party
Chancellor	Helmut Kohl	1 October 1982	30 March 1983	CDU
Vice Chancellor & Federal Minister of Foreign Affairs	Hans-Dietrich Genscher	4 October 1982	30 March 1983	FDP
Federal Minister of Defense	Manfred Wörner	4 October 1982	30 March 1983	CDU
Federal Minister of the Interior	Friedrich Zimmermann	4 October 1982	30 March 1983	CSU
Federal Minister of Finance	Gerhard Stoltenberg	4 October 1982	30 March 1983	CDU
Federal Minister of Justice	Hans A. Engelhard	4 October 1982	30 March 1983	FDP
Federal Minister of Economics	Otto Graf Lambsdorff	4 October 1982	30 March 1983	FDP
Federal Minister of Labour and Social Affairs	Norbert Blüm	4 October 1982	30 March 1983	CDU
Federal Minister of Food, Agriculture, and Forestry	Josef Ertl	4 October 1982	30 March 1983	FDP
Federal Minister of Transport	Werner Dollinger	4 October 1982	30 March 1983	CSU
Federal Minister of Construction	Oscar Schneider	4 October 1982	30 March 1983	CSU
Federal Minister of Youth, Family, and Health	Heiner Geissler	4 October 1982	30 March 1983	CDU
Federal Minister of Research and Technology	Heinz Riesenhuber	4 October 1982	30 March 1983	CDU
Federal Minister of Education and Science	Dorothee Wilms	4 October 1982	30 March 1983	CDU
Federal Minister of Economic Cooperation	Jürgen Warnke	4 October 1982	30 March 1983	CSU
Federal Minister of Posts and Communications	Christian Schwarz-Schilling	4 October 1982	30 March 1983	CDU
Federal Minister of Intra-German Relations	Rainer Barzel	4 October 1982	30 March 1983	CDU
