= First Schmidt cabinet =

West German government from 1974 to 1976

First Cabinet of Helmut Schmidt Cabinet Schmidt I
- 10th Cabinet of the Federal Republic of Germany
- 16 May 1974 – 16 December 1976 (until 14 December 1976 as caretaker government)
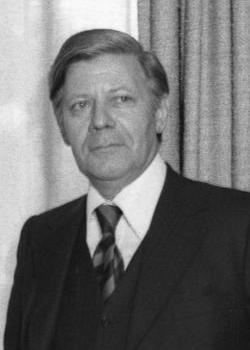
- Date formed: 16 May 1974
- Date dissolved: 14 December 1976 (2 years, 6 months and 4 weeks)

People and organisations
- President: Gustav Heinemann
- Chancellor: Helmut Schmidt
- Vice-Chancellor: Hans-Dietrich Genscher
- Member party: Social Democratic Party; Free Democratic Party
- Status in legislature: Coalition government
- Opposition party: Christian Democratic Union; Christian Social Union
- Opposition leader: Karl Carstens (CDU)

History
- Election: None
- Legislature terms: 7th Bundestag
- Predecessor: Brandt II
- Successor: Schmidt II

The First Schmidt cabinet was the government of West Germany between 16 May 1974 and 14 December 1976, during the 7th legislature of the Bundestag. It was formed after Brandt had resigned from his position as chancellor on 6 May 1974. Led by the Social Democrat Helmut Schmidt, the cabinet was a coalition between the Social Democrats (SPD) and the Free Democratic Party (FDP). The Vice-Chancellor and Foreign Minister was Hans-Dietrich Genscher (FDP).

The cabinet faced its first major internal crisis only weeks after taking office, when Development Minister Erhard Eppler resigned in July 1974 following disputes over budget cuts, exposing early tensions within the governing coalition.

== Composition ==
Cabinet members
Portfolio	Minister	Took office	Left office	Party
Chancellor	Helmut Schmidt	16 May 1974	14 December 1976	SPD
Vice-Chancellor & Federal Minister of Foreign Affairs	Hans-Dietrich Genscher	16 May 1974	14 December 1976	FDP
Federal Minister of Interior	Werner Maihofer	16 May 1974	14 December 1976	FDP
Federal Minister of Justice	Hans-Jochen Vogel	16 May 1974	14 December 1976	SPD
Federal Minister of Finance	Hans Apel	16 May 1974	14 December 1976	SPD
Federal Minister of Economics	Hans Friderichs	16 May 1974	14 December 1976	FDP
Federal Minister of Defence	Georg Leber	16 May 1974	14 December 1976	SPD
Federal Minister of Transport & Post and Communications	Kurt Gscheidle	16 May 1974	14 December 1976	SPD
Federal Minister of Research and Technology	Hans Matthöfer	16 May 1974	14 December 1976	SPD
Federal Minister of Food and Agriculture	Josef Ertl	16 May 1974	14 December 1976	FDP
Federal Minister of Labour and Social Affairs	Walter Arendt	16 May 1974	14 December 1976	SPD
Federal Minister of Youth, Families and Health	Katharina Focke	16 May 1974	14 December 1976	SPD
Federal Minister of Intra-German Relations	Egon Franke	16 May 1974	14 December 1976	SPD
Federal Minister of Education and Science	Helmut Rohde	16 May 1974	14 December 1976	SPD
Federal Minister of Economic Cooperation	Erhard Eppler	16 May 1974	8 July 1974	SPD
Federal Minister of Economic Cooperation	Egon Bahr	8 July 1974	14 December 1976	SPD
Federal Minister of Planning, Architecture und Urban Development	Karl Ravens	16 May 1974	14 December 1976	SPD
