= First Brandt cabinet =

West German government from 1969 to 1972

First Cabinet of Willy Brandt Cabinet Brandt I
- 8th Cabinet of the Federal Republic of Germany
- 22 October 1969 – 13 December 1972 (until 15 December 1972 as caretaker government)
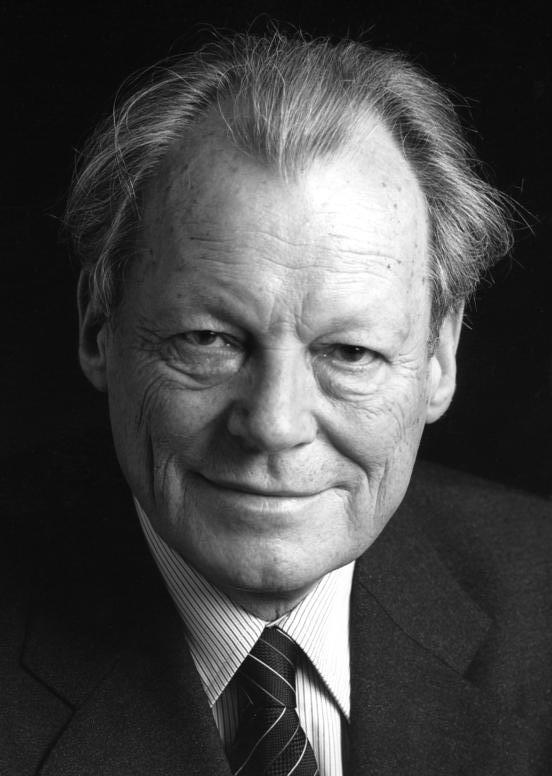
- Date formed: 22 October 1969
- Date dissolved: 15 December 1972 (3 years, 1 month, 3 weeks and 2 days)

People and organisations
- President: Gustav Heinemann
- Chancellor: Willy Brandt
- Vice-Chancellor: Walter Scheel
- Member party: Social Democratic Party; Free Democratic Party
- Status in legislature: Coalition government
- Opposition party: Christian Democratic Union; Christian Social Union
- Opposition leader: Rainer Barzel (CDU)

History
- Election: 1969 West German federal election
- Legislature terms: 6th Bundestag
- Predecessor: Kiesinger
- Successor: Brandt II

The First Brandt cabinet was the government of West Germany between 22 October 1969 and 15 December 1972, during the 6th legislature of the Bundestag. Led by the Social Democrat Willy Brandt, the cabinet was a coalition between the Social Democrats (SPD) and the Free Democratic Party (FDP). The Vice-Chancellor was the Free Democrat Walter Scheel (FDP).

== Composition ==
Portfolio	Minister	Took office	Left office	Party
Chancellor	Willy Brandt	22 October 1969	15 December 1972	SPD
Vice-Chancellor & Federal Minister of Foreign Affairs	Walter Scheel	22 October 1969	15 December 1972	FDP
Federal Minister of Interior	Hans-Dietrich Genscher	22 October 1969	15 December 1972	FDP
Minister of Justice	Gerhard Jahn	22 October 1969	15 December 1972	SPD
Federal Minister of Finance	Alexander Möller	11 October 1969	13 May 1971	SPD
Federal Minister of Finance	Karl Schiller	13 May 1971	7 July 1972	SPD
Federal Minister of Finance	Helmut Schmidt	7 July 1972	15 December 1972	SPD
Federal Minister of Economics	Karl Schiller	22 October 1969	7 July 1972	SPD
Federal Minister of Economics	Helmut Schmidt	7 July 1972	15 December 1972	SPD
Federal Minister of Defence	Helmut Schmidt	22 October 1969	7 July 1972	SPD
Federal Minister of Defence	Georg Leber	7 July 1972	15 December 1972	SPD
Federal Minister of Transport & Post and Communications	Georg Leber	22 October 1969	7 July 1972	SPD
Federal Minister of Transport & Post and Communications	Lauritz Lauritzen	7 July 1972	15 December 1972	SPD
Federal Minister of Urban Development and Housing	Lauritz Lauritzen	22 October 1969	15 December 1972	SPD
Federal Minister of Food and Agriculture	Josef Ertl	22 October 1969	15 December 1972	FDP
Federal Minister of Labour and Social Affairs	Walter Arendt	22 October 1969	15 December 1972	SPD
Federal Minister of Youth, Families and Health	Käte Strobel	22 October 1969	15 December 1972	SPD
Federal Minister of Intra-German Relations	Egon Franke	22 October 1969	15 December 1972	SPD
Federal Minister of Education and Science	Hans Leussink	22 October 1969	15 March 1972	Independent
Federal Minister of Education and Science	Klaus von Dohnanyi	15 March 1972	15 December 1972	SPD
Federal Minister of Economic Cooperation	Erhard Eppler	22 October 1969	15 December 1972	SPD
Federal Minister for Special Affairs & Head of the Chancellery	Horst Ehmke	22 October 1969	15 December 1972	SPD

== See also ==
- Cabinet of Germany
- Cabinet Brandt II
