= Second Brandt cabinet =

West German government from 1972 to 1974

Second Cabinet of Willy Brandt Cabinet Brandt II
- 9th Cabinet of the Federal Republic of Germany
- 15 December 1972 – 6 May 1974 (until 16 May 1974 as caretaker government)
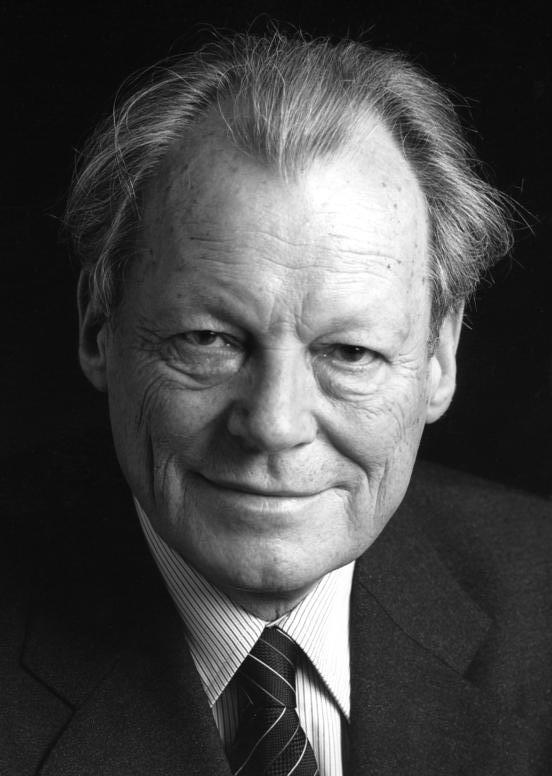
- Date formed: 15 December 1972
- Date dissolved: 16 May 1974 (1 year, 5 months and 1 day)

People and organisations
- President: Gustav Heinemann
- Chancellor: Willy Brandt (until 7 May 1974); Walter Scheel (Acting; from 7 May 1974)
- Vice-Chancellor: Walter Scheel
- Member party: Social Democratic Party; Free Democratic Party
- Status in legislature: Coalition government
- Opposition party: Christian Democratic Union; Christian Social Union
- Opposition leader: Rainer Barzel (CDU), until 1973; Karl Carstens (CDU), from 1973

History
- Election: 1972 West German federal election
- Legislature terms: 7th Bundestag
- Predecessor: Brandt I
- Successor: Schmidt I

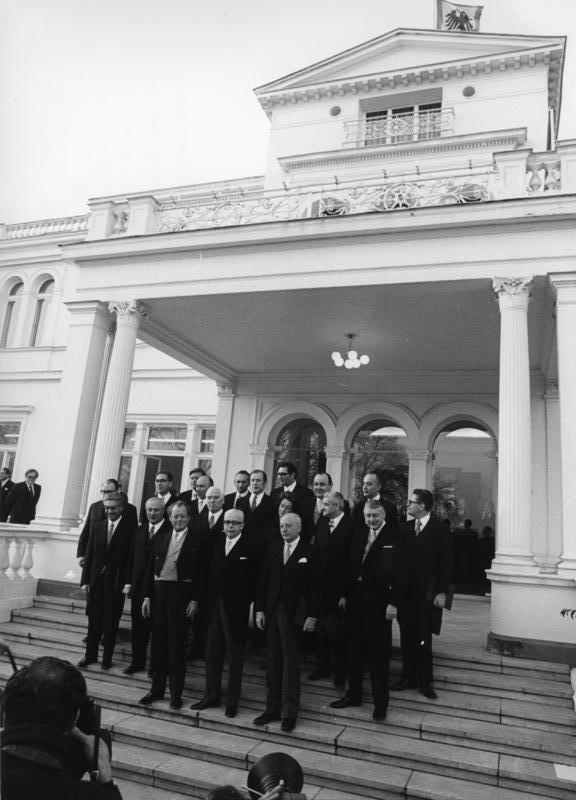
Cabinet Brandt II outside the Hammerschmidt Villa on 15 December 1972

The Second Brandt cabinet was the government of West Germany between 15 December 1972 and 16 May 1974, during the 7th legislature of the Bundestag. Led by the Social Democrat Willy Brandt, the cabinet was a coalition between the Social Democrats (SPD) and the Free Democratic Party (FDP). It followed the Cabinet Brandt I. Following Brandt's resignation as Chancellor on 7 May 1974, Vice-Chancellor Walter Scheel (FDP) served as Acting Chancellor for nine days, until the inception of the Cabinet Schmidt I.

== Composition ==
Notable members of the second Brandt cabinet included Minister of Finance Helmut Schmidt, who went on to become the next German Chancellor.

Portfolio	Minister	Took office	Left office	Party
Chancellor	Willy Brandt	15 December 1972	7 May 1974	SPD
Chancellor	Walter Scheel (Acting)	7 May 1974	16 May 1974	FDP
Vice-Chancellor & Federal Minister of Foreign Affairs	Walter Scheel	15 December 1972	16 May 1974	FDP
Federal Minister of Interior	Hans-Dietrich Genscher	15 December 1972	16 May 1974	FDP
Federal Minister of Justice	Gerhard Jahn	15 December 1972	16 May 1974	SPD
Federal Minister of Finance	Helmut Schmidt	15 December 1972	16 May 1974	SPD
Federal Minister of Economics	Hans Friderichs	15 December 1972	16 May 1974	FDP
Federal Minister of Defence	Georg Leber	15 December 1972	16 May 1974	SPD
Federal Minister of Research and Technology & Post and Communications	Horst Ehmke	15 December 1972	16 May 1974	SPD
Federal Minister of Food and Agriculture	Josef Ertl	15 December 1972	16 May 1974	FDP
Federal Minister of Labour and Social Affairs	Walter Arendt	15 December 1972	16 May 1974	SPD
Federal Minister of Youth, Families and Health	Katharina Focke	15 December 1972	16 May 1974	SPD
Federal Minister of Intra-German Relations	Egon Franke	15 December 1972	16 May 1974	SPD
Federal Minister of Education and Science	Klaus von Dohnanyi	15 December 1972	16 May 1974	SPD
Federal Minister of Economic Cooperation	Erhard Eppler	15 December 1972	16 May 1974	SPD
Federal Minister of Planning, Construction und Urban Development	Hans-Jochen Vogel	15 December 1972	16 May 1974	SPD
Federal Minister for Special Affairs	Egon Bahr	15 December 1972	15 May 1974	SPD
Federal Minister for Special Affairs & Affairs of the Vice Chancellor	Werner Maihofer	15 December 1972	16 May 1974	FDP
Secretary of State & Head of the Chancellery	Horst Grabert	15 December 1972	15 May 1974	SPD

== See also ==
- Cabinet of Germany
