= Second Kohl cabinet =

West German government from 1983 to 1987

Second Cabinet of Helmut Kohl Cabinet Kohl II
- 14th Cabinet of the Federal Republic of Germany
- 30 March 1983 – 18 February 1987 (until 12 March 1987 as caretaker government)
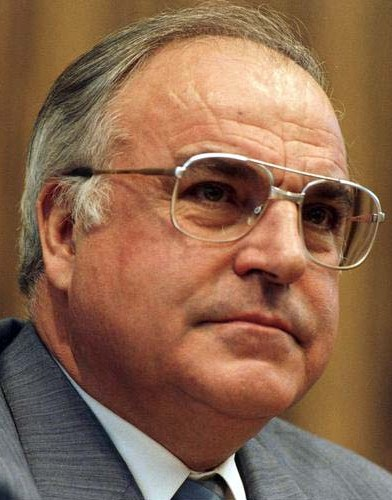
- Helmut Kohl
- Date formed: 30 March 1983
- Date dissolved: 12 March 1987 (3 years, 11 months, 1 week and 5 days)

People and organisations
- President: Karl Carstens (until 30 June 1984); Richard von Weizsäcker (from 30 June 1984)
- Chancellor: Helmut Kohl
- Vice-Chancellor: Hans-Dietrich Genscher
- Member party: Christian Democratic Union; Christian Social Union; Free Democratic Party
- Status in legislature: Coalition government
- Opposition party: Social Democratic Party; The Greens
- Opposition leader: Hans-Jochen Vogel (SPD)

History
- Election: 1983 federal election
- Legislature terms: 10th Bundestag
- Predecessor: Kohl I
- Successor: Kohl III

Within the politics of Germany, the Second Kohl cabinet led by Helmut Kohl, was sworn in on 30 March 1983 and laid down its function on 11 March 1987. The cabinet was formed after the 1983 elections. It was succeeded by the Cabinet Kohl III, which was formed following the 1987 elections. Starting in June 1986 it was the first West German federal cabinet to have a Minister of the Environment.

== Composition ==
The second Kohl cabinet had 21 members.

Portfolio	Minister	Took office	Left office	Party
Chancellor	Helmut Kohl	30 March 1983	12 March 1987	CDU
Vice Chancellor & Federal Minister of Foreign Affairs	Hans-Dietrich Genscher	30 March 1983	12 March 1987	FDP
Federal Minister of Defense	Manfred Wörner	30 March 1983	12 March 1987	CDU
Federal Minister of the Interior	Friedrich Zimmermann	30 March 1983	12 March 1987	CSU
Federal Minister of Finance	Gerhard Stoltenberg	30 March 1983	12 March 1987	CDU
Federal Minister of Justice	Hans A. Engelhard	30 March 1983	12 March 1987	FDP
Federal Minister of Economics	Otto Graf Lambsdorff	30 March 1983	24 June 1984	FDP
Federal Minister of Economics	Martin Bangemann	24 June 1984	12 March 1987	FDP
Federal Minister of Labour and Social Affairs	Norbert Blüm	30 March 1983	12 March 1987	CDU
Federal Minister of Food, Agriculture, and Forestry	Ignaz Kiechle	30 March 1983	12 March 1987	CSU
Federal Minister of Transport	Werner Dollinger	30 March 1983	12 March 1987	CSU
Federal Minister of Construction	Oscar Schneider	30 March 1983	12 March 1987	CSU
Federal Minister of Youth, Family, and Health	Heiner Geissler	30 March 1983	26 September 1985	CDU
Federal Minister of Youth, Family, and Health	Rita Süssmuth	26 September 1985	12 March 1987	CDU
Federal Minister of Research and Technology	Heinz Riesenhuber	30 March 1983	12 March 1987	CDU
Federal Minister of Education and Science	Dorothee Wilms	30 March 1983	12 March 1987	CDU
Federal Minister of Economic Cooperation	Jürgen Warnke	30 March 1983	12 March 1987	CSU
Federal Minister of Posts and Communications	Christian Schwarz-Schilling	30 March 1983	12 March 1987	CDU
Federal Minister of Intra-German Relations	Heinrich Windelen	30 March 1983	12 March 1987	CDU
Federal Minister of Special Affairs	Wolfgang Schäuble	15 November 1984	12 March 1987	CDU
Federal Minister of the Environment	Walter Wallmann	6 June 1986	12 March 1987	CDU
