= Westrick =

Westrick is a surname. Notable people with the surname include:

- Gerhard Alois Westrick (1889–1957), German lawyer and businessman
- Ludger Westrick (1894–1990), German politician
