= Minister of Intra-German Relations =

Federal Minister of Intra-German Relations
- Bundesminister für innerdeutsche Beziehungen
- Coat of arms of Germany.

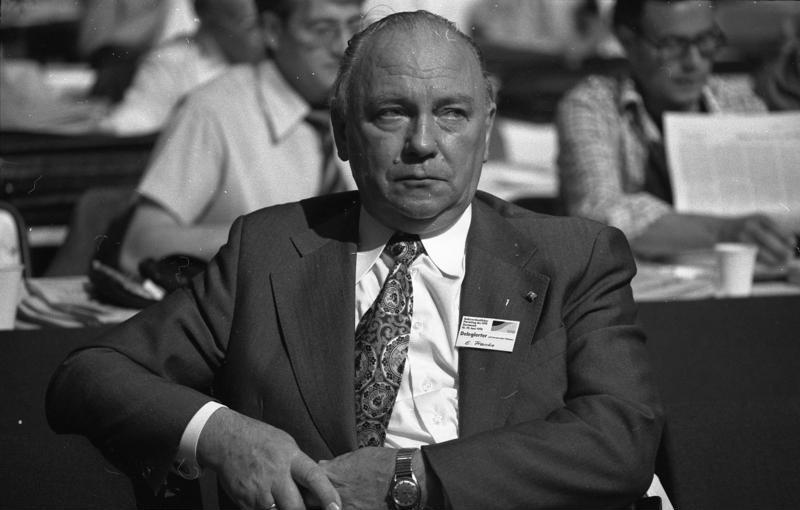
- Longest serving Egon Franke; 22 October 1969 – 1 October 1982
- Status: Abolished
- Member of: the Cabinet
- Reports to: the Chancellor
- Formation: 20 September 1949
- First holder: Jakob Kaiser
- Final holder: Dorothee Wilms
- Abolished: 9 November 1989 (effectively); 18 January 1991 (formally)
- Succession: Federal Minister of the Interior

The Federal Minister of Intra-German Relations (German: Bundesminister für innerdeutsche Beziehungen) was a federal cabinet minister of the Federal Republic of Germany (West Germany). The office was created under the title of Federal Minister of All-German Affairs (Bundesminister für gesamtdeutsche Fragen) in 1949, being also in charge of the German lands east of the Oder–Neisse line which had been put under Polish or Soviet administration. In 1951, the first Minister of All-German Affairs Jakob Kaiser openly raised claim to even greater territories including Austria, parts of Switzerland, the Saar area and Alsace-Lorraine.

The ministry was renamed in 1969 because "All-German" might have evoked irredentist associations. The change of the name was supported by both left- and right-wing politicians.

The ministry was abolished in 1991 when a new government was established after the federal election of December 1990, some months after German reunification, having supported the transition.

Since West Germany maintained an exclusive mandate for all of Germany, and the legal pretense that the authorities of the German Democratic Republic (East Germany) or Soviet occupation zone (SBZ) should not be recognized, it could not handle relations with East Germany through the Federal Foreign Office, since this would acknowledge that the GDR was a separate country. Hence, a separate ministry for relations within Germany had to be created. Since this ministry had very limited competence and virtually no political power, it soon became a post used by chancellors to block rivals without publicly offending them. One of the main tasks of the ministry was the publication of information material about the situation in the East, to keep the idea of German unity alive and to inform the public about actions of the East German government.

When German reunification became a possibility after the fall of the Berlin Wall and the opening of the inner German border on 9 November 1989, the ministry was completely disempowered by Chancellor Helmut Kohl; all intra-German affairs were now handled by the Ministry of the Interior under Wolfgang Schäuble. Formally, the ministry continued to exist until 1991 in order to facilitate transition.

== Ministers ==
Political Party: CDU FDP SPD

No.	Portrait	Name (Birth–Death)	Term			Political Party	Government
No.	Portrait	Name (Birth–Death)	Took office	Left office	Time in office	Political Party	Government
Federal Minister of All-German Affairs
1	Jakob Kaiser	Jakob Kaiser (1888–1961)	20 September 1949	29 October 1957	8 years, 39 days	CDU	Adenauer I–II
2	Ernst Lemmer	Ernst Lemmer (1898–1970)	29 October 1957	13 December 1962	5 years, 45 days	CDU	Adenauer III–IV
3	Rainer Barzel	Rainer Barzel (1924–2006)	14 December 1962	11 October 1963	301 days	CDU	Adenauer V
4	Erich Mende	Erich Mende (1916–1998)	17 October 1963	28 October 1966	3 years, 11 days	FDP	Erhard I–II
5	Johann Baptist Gradl	Johann Baptist Gradl (1904–1988)	28 October 1966	30 November 1966	33 days	CDU	Erhard II
6	Herbert Wehner	Herbert Wehner (1906–1990)	1 December 1966	21 October 1969	2 years, 324 days	SPD	Kiesinger
Federal Minister of Intra-German Relations
7	Egon Franke	Egon Franke (1913–1995)	22 October 1969	1 October 1982	12 years, 344 days	SPD	Brandt I–II; Schmidt I–II–III
8	Rainer Barzel	Rainer Barzel (1924–2006)	4 October 1982	29 March 1983	176 days	CDU	Kohl I
9	Heinrich Windelen	Heinrich Windelen (1921–2015)	30 March 1983	11 March 1987	3 years, 346 days	CDU	Kohl II
10	Dorothee Wilms	Dorothee Wilms (born 1929)	12 March 1987	18 January 1991	3 years, 312 days	CDU	Kohl III

== Publications ==
- BMgF (Hrsg.): SBZ von A-Z, Deutscher Bundes-Verlag, Bonn, 1. bis 10. Aufl., 1953 bis 1966, ca. 500 Seiten.
- BMgF (Hrsg.): Sowjetische Auffassungen zur Deutschlandfrage 1945–1954. Dargestellt nach amtlichen Dokumenten, Deutscher Bundes-Verlag, Bonn, 1954.
- BMgF (Hrsg.): Wer ist wer in der SBZ? Ein biographisches Handbuch, Verlag für Internationalen Kulturaustausch, Berlin, 1958.
- BMgF (Hrsg.): Die Situation der Jugend im kommunistischen Herrschaftssystem der SBZ Deutschlands in Bonner Berichte aus Mittel- und Ostdeutschland, Bonn – Berlin, 1960.
- BMgF (Hrsg.): Die Bemühungen der Bundesrepublik um Wiederherstellung der Einheit Deutschlands durch gesamtdeutsche Wahlen. Dokumente und Akten. I. Teil, Oktober 1949–Oktober 1953, Deutscher Bundes-Verlag, Bonn, 1958.

== See also ==
- Central Registry of State Judicial Administrations, a West German registry to verify East German human rights violations from 1961 until 1992.
- Committee for Reunification / Ministry of Unification, the North / South Korean departments handling similar issues.
- Mainland Affairs Council / Taiwan Affairs Office, the Taiwanese / Mainland Chinese departments handling similar issues.
