= Helga Henselder-Barzel =

German political scientist

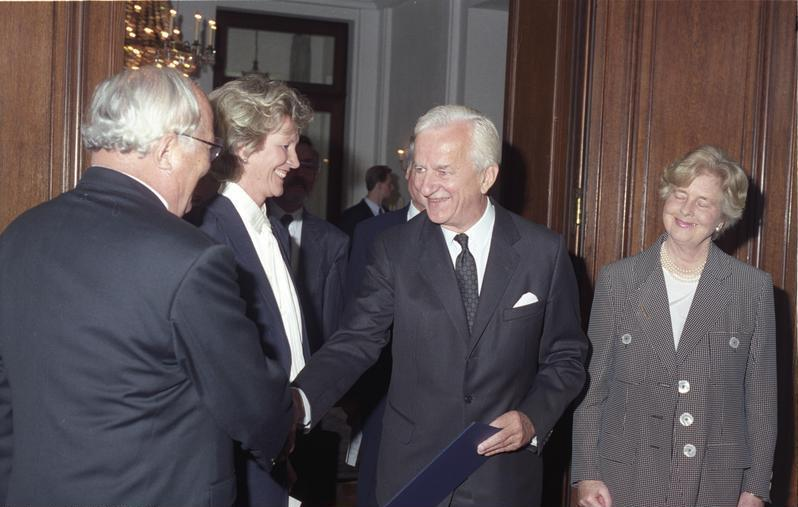
- Henselder-Barzel (2nd from left) receiving the Federal Cross of Merit in 1993
- Born: 4 January 1940; Koblenz
- Died: 15 December 1995 (aged 55); Solms
- Scientific career
- Fields: Political science
- Workplaces: Welthungerhilfe

Helga Henselder-Barzel (4 January 1940 – 15 December 1995) was a German political scientist. She was the president of the German non-governmental organization Welthungerhilfe from 1984 until her death in 1995. In that capacity she critiqued contemporary public policy in Germany, particularly advocating for increased poverty reduction efforts and aid to women in developing countries.

In 1971, Henselder-Barzel published the book Marokko zwischen Demokratie und Diktatur (Morocco between democracy and dictatorship).

In 1993, she was awarded the Order of Merit of the Federal Republic of Germany.

She married Rainer Barzel in 1982, shortly before he became President of the Bundestag. Her grandfather was the automobile pioneer August Horch.

== Selected works ==
- Marokko zwischen Demokratie und Diktatur (1971)

== Selected awards ==
- Order of Merit of the Federal Republic of Germany (1993)
