= List of German postal ministers =

This article lists German Postal Ministers. See also lists of incumbents.

== State Secretaries for the Post, 1880–1918 ==
- Heinrich von Stephan 1880–1897
- Viktor von Podbielski 1897–1901
- Reinhold Kraetke 1901–1917
- Otto Rüdlin 1917–1918

== Ministers of Post, 1918–1945 ==
No.	Portrait	Name (born–died)	Term of office			Political party	Government	Ref.
No.	Portrait	Name (born–died)	Took office	Left office	Time in office	Political party	Government	Ref.
1	Johannes Giesberts	Johannes Giesberts (1865–1938)	13 February 1919	14 November 1922	3 years, 274 days	Centre	Scheidemann; Bauer; Müller I Fehrenbach; Wirth I–II	.
2	Karl Stingl	Karl Stingl (1864–1936)	22 November 1922	12 August 1923	263 days	BVP	Cuno	.
3	Anton Höfle	Anton Höfle (1882–1925)	13 August 1923	15 December 1924	1 year, 124 days	Centre	Stresemann I–II; Marx I–II	.
(2)	Karl Stingl	Karl Stingl (1864–1936)	15 January 1925	17 December 1926	1 year, 336 days	BVP	Luther I–II–III	.
4	Georg Schätzel	Georg Schätzel (1875–1934)	28 January 1927	30 May 1932	5 years, 123 days	BVP	Marx IV; Müller II; Brüning I–II	.
5	Paul Freiherr von Eltz-Rübenach	Paul Freiherr von Eltz-Rübenach (1875–1943)	1 June 1932	2 February 1937	4 years, 246 days	Independent	Papen; Schleicher; Hitler	.
6	Wilhelm Ohnesorge	Wilhelm Ohnesorge (1872–1962)	2 February 1937	30 April 1945	8 years, 87 days	NSDAP	Hitler	.
7	Julius Dorpmüller	Julius Dorpmüller (1869–1945)	5 May 1945	23 May 1945	18 days	NSDAP	Krosigk	.

== West and East Germany, 1949–1997 ==
=== Federal Ministers of Post and Teleommunications of the Federal Republic of Germany, 1949–1997 ===
- Hans Schuberth 1949–1953
- Siegfried Balke 1953–1956
- Ernst Lemmer 1956–1957
- Richard Stücklen 1957–1966
- Werner Dollinger 1966–1969
- Georg Leber 1969–1972
- Lauritz Lauritzen 1972
- Horst Ehmke 1972–1974
- Kurt Gscheidle 1974–1982
- Hans Matthöfer 1982
- Christian Schwarz-Schilling 1982–1992
- Wolfgang Bötsch 1993–1997

The ministry was abolished at the end of 1997.

=== Minister of Post and Telecommunications of the German Democratic Republic, 1949–1991 ===
- Friedrich Burmeister: 7 October 1949 – 13 November 1963 (CDU)
- Rudolph Schulze: 14 November 1963 – 7 November 1989 (CDU)
- Klaus Wolf: 18 November 1989 – 12 April 1990 (CDU)
- Emil Schnell: 12 April 1990 – 20 August 1990 (SPD)
- Hans-Jürgen Niehof: 20 August 1990 – 2 October 1990 (FDP)

== Flags ==
Postal flag (1892–1918)

Postal flag (1921–1933)

Postal flag (1933–1935)

Postal flag Germany

Postal flag East Germany
