= Hans Leussink =

German teacher and politician (1912-2008)

Hans Leussink (1970)

Hans Leussink (2 February 1912 in Schüttorf – 16 February 2008 in Karlsruhe) was a German teacher and politician. He served as the country's Minister for Education and Research from October 1969 to March 1972 in Cabinet Brandt I under Chancellor Willy Brandt. His descendants live in Canada and the Netherlands.

He was the oldest former minister of all time in Germany until his death on 16 February 2008.

In 1994 Leussink was elected as Foreign Honorary Member of the American Academy of Arts and Sciences.
