= Horst Grabert =

German politician (1927–2011)

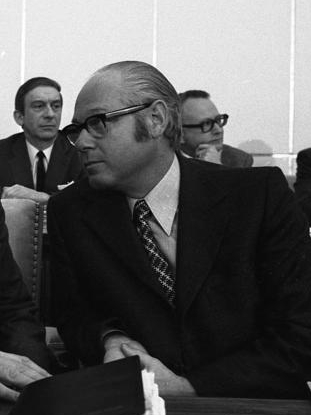
- Grabert in 1974

Head of the Chancellery West Germany
- In office 18 December 1972 – 15 May 1974
- Chancellor: Willy Brandt Walter Scheel (acting)
- Preceded by: Horst Ehmke
- Succeeded by: Manfred Schüler

Member of the Abgeordnetenhaus of Berlin West Berlin
- In office 14 March 1971 – 18 January 1973
- President: Walter Sickert
- Succeeded by: Ursula Maletzke

Senator of Federal Affairs of Berlin West Berlin
- In office 9 July 1969 – 18 December 1972
- Governor: Klaus Schütz
- Preceded by: Dietrich Spangenberg
- Succeeded by: Dietrich Stobbe

Personal details
- Born: 12 December 1927 Berlin, Germany
- Died: 10 October 2011 (aged 83) Berlin, Germany
- Party: SPD
- Education: Technische Universität Berlin
- Occupation: Politician; diplomat

Horst Grabert (12 December 1927 – 10 October 2011) was a German politician and diplomat.

== Early life and education ==
Grabert's father worked as an accountant after serving as a front officer in the First World War. Although Grabert, like his Jewish mother, was baptized as a Protestant in 1939, he had to leave the Steglitz high school in 1942. After an apprenticeship as an architectural draftsman, he was sent to a labor camp in 1944. Without a high school diploma, he was able to study at Technische Universität Berlin from 1946 after a special examination and became a qualified civil engineer in 1952.

== Career ==
In 1952 Grabert joined the West Berlin Senate Administration and became a government construction trainee at the Senator for Construction and Housing. In 1955 he passed the building assessor exam and subsequently rose from building officer to senior building officer, building director and, in 1963, senate director. From 1969 to 1973 he was Senator for Federal Affairs and at the same time the official representative of Berlin at federal level.

== Awards ==
Country	Year	Decoration	Ribbon
Austria	1973	Decoration of Honour for Services to the Republic of Austria	
Austria	1979	Decoration of Honour for Services to the Republic of Austria	
Germany	1984	Order of Merit of the Federal Republic of Germany	
