= Antje Huber =

German politician (1924–2015)

Federal Minister for Youth, Family and Health
- In office 16 December 1976 – 28 April 1982
- Preceded by: Katharina Focke
- Succeeded by: Anke Fuchs

Personal details
- Born: 23 May 1924 Stettin, Weimar Germany
- Died: 30 September 2015 (aged 91) Essen, Germany
- Party: Social Democratic Party (SPD)

Antje Huber (23 May 1924 – 30 September 2015) was a German politician who was the Federal Minister for Youth, Family and Health from 1976 to 1982. She served as a member of the Bundestag for the SPD between 1969 and 1987.
