= Heinz Westphal =

German politician (1924–1998)

Heinz Westphal (4 June 1924 in Berlin – 30 October 1998 in Bonn) was a German politician, representing the SPD. From April to October 1982, he was the Federal Ministry of Labour and Social Affairs and from 1983 to 1990 he was the vice-president of the German Bundestag.

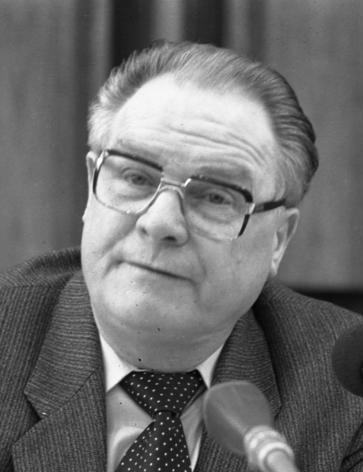
Heinz Westphal in 1983
