= Dieter Haack =

German politician (born 1934)

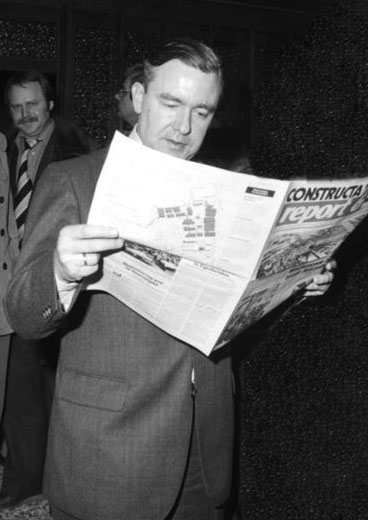

Minister of Housing and Town Planning
- In office 16 February 1978 – 1982
- Chancellor: Helmut Schmidt
- Preceded by: Karl Ravens

Personal details
- Born: 9 June 1934 (age 92) Karlsruhe, Nazi Germany
- Party: Social Democratic Party
- Education: University of Erlangen–Nuremberg; University of Bonn

Dieter Haack (born 9 June 1934) is a German politician from the Social Democratic Party of Germany (SPD). He served as the minister of housing und town planning between 1978 and 1982.

== Early life and education ==
Haack was born in Karlsruhe on 9 June 1934. He received a degree in law from the University of Erlangen–Nuremberg and a PhD in law from the University of Bonn. He was a legal trainee until 1963. During his university education he joined the SPD in 1961.

== Career ==
Following his graduation Haack worked at different state institutions in Bavaria. He was elected to the Bundestag in 1969 where he served until 1990. He was the parliamentary state secretary at the Ministry of Housing until February 1978. He was appointed minister of housing und town planning in a cabinet reshuffle on 16 February 1978 succeeding Karl Ravens in the post. Later the ministry headed by Haack was renamed as the Ministry of Regional Planning, Building and Urban Development. Haack served in the cabinet led by Prime Minister Helmut Schmidt until 1982.

From 1990 to 2002 Haack was the president of the State Synod of the Evangelical Lutheran Church in Bavaria.

=== Awards ===
Haack is the recipient of the Bavarian Order of Merit (1981) and the Order of Merit (1990).

Haack was made the honorary citizen of Erlangen on 7 July 2004.
