= Christian Schwarz-Schilling =

German politician and businessman (1930–2026)

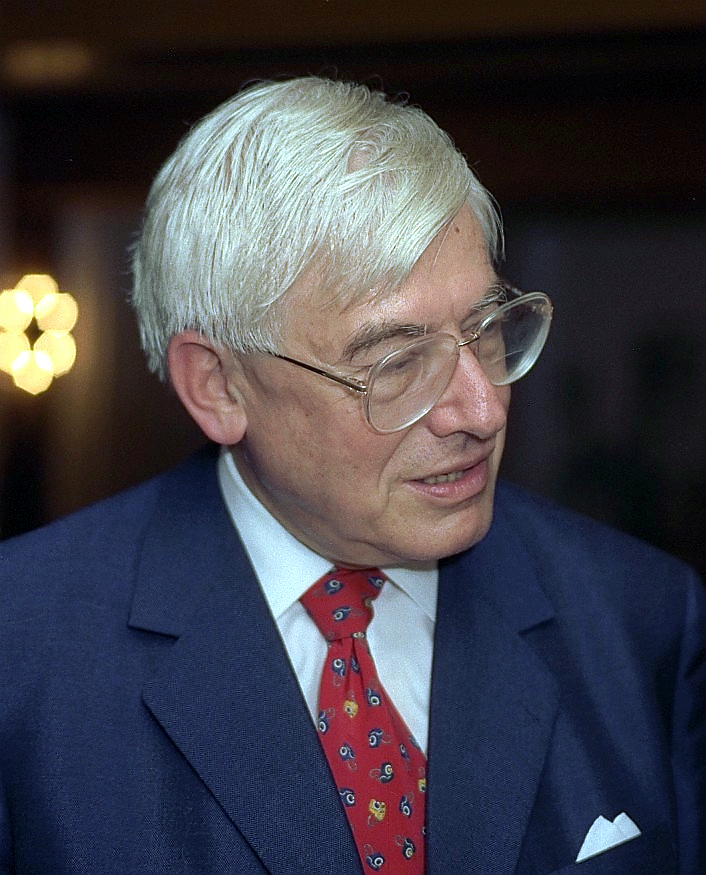
- Schwarz-Schilling in 1993

High Representative for Bosnia and Herzegovina
- In office 31 January 2006 – 2 July 2007
- Preceded by: Paddy Ashdown
- Succeeded by: Miroslav Lajčák

Minister of Post and Telecommunications
- In office 4 October 1982 – 17 December 1992
- Chancellor: Helmut Kohl
- Preceded by: Hans Matthöfer
- Succeeded by: Wolfgang Bötsch

Member of the Bundestag; from Hesse
- In office 14 December 1976 – 17 October 2002
- Constituency: State list (1976–1983); Wetterau (1983–1998); State list (1998–2002)

Member of the Landtag of Hesse
- In office 1 December 1966 – 13 December 1976
- Preceded by: Multi-member district
- Succeeded by: Arnold Spruck
- Constituency: State list

Personal details
- Born: 19 November 1930 Innsbruck, Tyrol, Austria
- Died: 6 April 2026 (aged 95) Büdingen, Hesse, Germany
- Party: Christian Democratic Union
- Spouse: Marie-Luise Jonen (m. 1957; died 2024)
- Children: 2
- Parent: Reinhard Schwarz-Schilling (father)
- Education: LMU Munich
- Occupation: Politician; historian; businessman; diplomat
- Awards: Order of Merit of the Federal Republic of Germany; Hessian Peace Prize; Light of Truth Award

Christian Schwarz-Schilling (Note: German pronunciation: [ˈkʁɪsti̯aːn ˌʃvaʁts ˈʃɪlɪŋ]) (19 November 1930 – 6 April 2026) was a German politician, businessman, philanthropist, and media and telecommunications innovator. A member of the Bundestag from 1976 to 2002, he was Federal Minister of Post and Telecommunications from 1982 to 1992 and served as High Representative for Bosnia and Herzegovina from 2006 to 2007.

== Early life and education ==
Christian Schwarz-Schilling was born on 19 November 1930 in Innsbruck. His father was the composer Reinhard Schwarz-Schilling and his mother was Dusza von Hakrid (1904–1987), a concert pianist from Jarosław. The family moved to Feldafing, Bavaria, in 1935, where his schooling began. He learned to play piano and organ. He became aware of his mother's Jewish origins only after the death of his parents; a German civil servant had changed her name in 1938 under the Nazi regime.

In 1950 he completed school with the Abitur at the Ernst-Moritz-Arndt Gymnasium in Berlin. He studied history and East Asian languages and culture at LMU Munich. In 1956, he achieved a Ph.D. for his thesis on Chinese History, Der Friede von Shan-Yüan 1005 n. Chr. und seine Auswirkungen auf die Beziehungen zwischen dem Chinesischen Reich und dem Liao-Reich der Kitan (The Peace of Shan Yuan 1005 AD, and Its Effects on the Relations Between the Chinese Empire and the Liao-Empire of Kitan).

== Professional career ==
In 1957, Schwarz-Schilling became manager of the battery manufacturer Accumulatorenfabrik Sonnenschein in Büdingen in Hesse; his wife, Marie-Luise, inherited the company. He remained in office until 1982. From 1993 to 2002, he was CEO of Dr. Schwarz-Schilling & Partner GmbH, his own telecommunications consultancy in Büdingen.

In 1971, he became a member of the Television Council of the ZDF, one of Germany's two public service TV stations, which he left in 1982. Between 1975 and 1983, he was chairman of the coordination council for Media Politics of the CDU/CSU.

== Political career ==
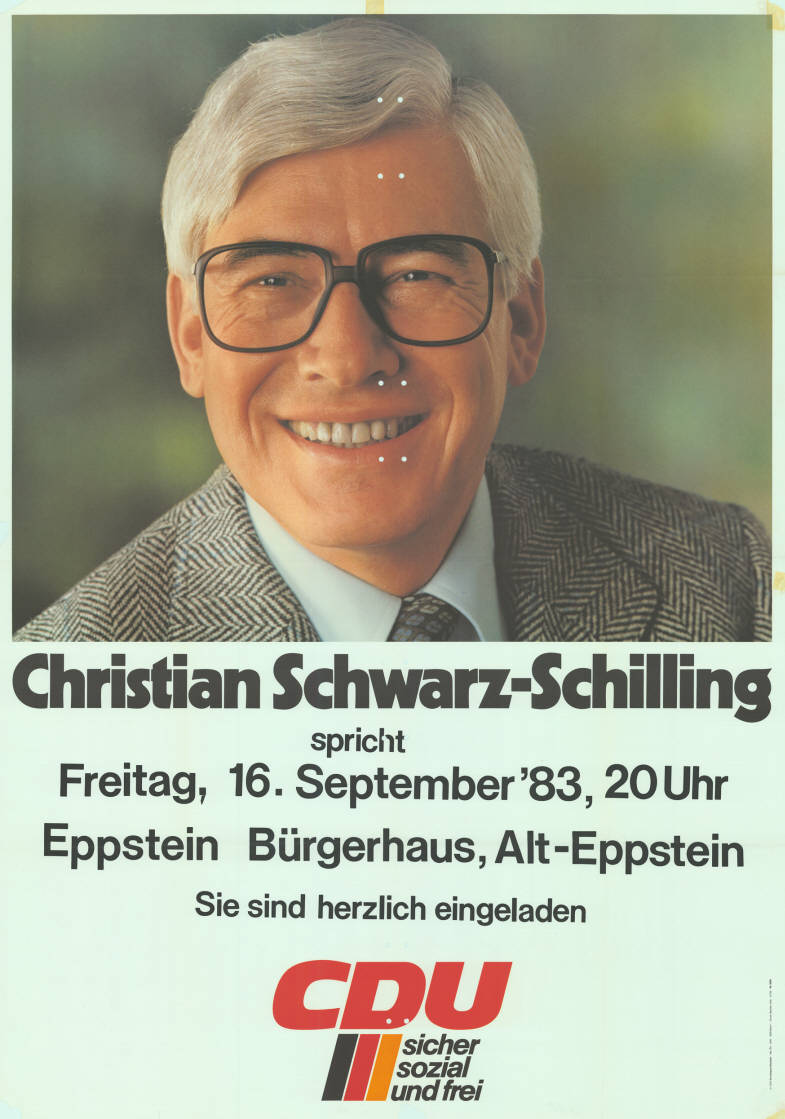
1983 election poster

During this period Schwarz-Schilling began to form an interest in regional politics, joining the Christian Democratic Union in 1960. In 1964, he joined the regional board of the CDU in Hesse. In 1966, Schwarz-Schilling was elected into the regional parliament of Hesse and in 1967 he became the general secretary of the CDU in Hesse.

Beginning in 1971, Schwarz-Schilling became involved in national politics, becoming member of several councils. In 1976 he was elected into the Bundestag and remained a member until 2002. During this time he served as the vice-chairman of the Small Business Union of the CDU/CSU between 1977 and 1997. In 1979, he became president of the Executive Bureau of the European Small Business Union, which he left in 1982. Between 1981 and 1982, he was chairperson of the Research Committee on New Information and Communication Technology of the Bundestag furthering innovative communications technology.

In 1982, he was appointed Federal Minister of Post and Telecommunications, in the first Helmut Kohl cabinet. He retained this post for the next three cabinets. During his tenure, cable television was introduced in Germany and commercial television was allowed to broadcast. Deutsche Post was privatised, including its Telecom business. Schwarz-Schilling also introduced GSM nationwide. He was instrumental in pushing the GSM-project of France, Germany, and Italy forward both technically and politically. He was responsible for letting the UK become part of it. This culminated in the Bonn declaration of 1987.

=== Criticism ===
To speed up the cable project, Schwarz-Schilling decided to involve private companies in the cable laying. Sonnenschein KG also involved his wife's company in the "Projektgesellschaft für Kabel-Kommunikation mbH", where Schwarz-Schilling himself had been managing director for many years. Schwarz-Schilling sold his shares in Sonnenschein KG to the Nixdorf Group only a few hours before his appointment as Post Minister. His decision to use copper led to incredulity both at home and abroad, as it was already foreseen in the early 1980s that fiber-optic cables were the "technology of the future." During his tenure, Schwarz-Schilling was known as "Kohl's most affair rich minister". The trigger for these affairs were usually the complications of his wife's family business in Schwarz-Schilling's political decisions.

== International political activity ==
In 1992 Schwarz-Schilling became aware of concentration camps in the Bosnian town of Prijedor, ruled by Serbian troops. He urged the Kohl administration and Western democracies to intervene in order to prevent war crimes. As nothing happened, he left his office as minister in protest on 14 December 1992. In 1994 he was requested by the United Nations to remain in Bosnia and mediate between the populations. In 1995, he became chairperson of the sub-committee on Human Rights and Humanitarian Aid of the Bundestag.

On 14 December 2005, Schwarz-Schilling was confirmed as the EU's special representative in Bosnia and Herzegovina and as High Representative (OHR), replacing Lord Ashdown. On 1 February 2006, he was appointed as such. He cast his role as that of "advisor" to the country who wants to "listen to the people".

Under Schwarz-Schilling, the OHR seemed to soften its invasiveness, thanks to pressures from the Council of Europe and a growing EU involvement. The number of OHR legislative initiatives and of dismissed officials lowered. The EU decision to shut down the OHR by June 2007 unexpectedly arose disappointment and concern in the Bosnian population, NGOs, and politicians. During his time in office, nationwide research by Oxford Research International, which Schwarz-Schilling oversaw, showed that the silent majority of Bosnia and Herzegovina was significantly more tolerant and forward-looking than the politicians who represented them. It also showed that several policies implemented by national politicians and the international community were out of step with what the population wanted.

Slovak diplomat Miroslav Lajčák replaced Schwarz-Schilling – who was originally intended to be the last holder of the post – on 2 July 2007. Lajčák retook a more intrusive approach in the work of the OHR, making it seem that apparently decreased intrusiveness was mostly due to the "weak personality" of Schwarz-Schilling.

== Personal life ==
Schwarz-Schilling was married to Marie-Luise (née Jonen); the couple had two children.

Christian Schwarz-Schilling died in Büdingen on 6 April 2026, at the age of 95.

== Awards ==
- 1990: Hessian Order of Merit
- 1992: Order of Merit of the Federal Republic of Germany
- 1995: Heinrich von Stephan Plaque
- 1997: Honorary doctorate of the Bryant University in Smithfield, Rhode Island, US
- 2002: Wilhelm Leuschner Medal
- 2006: Manfred Wörner Medal
- 2007: Hessian Peace Prize
- 2013: Light of Truth Award of the International Campaign for Tibet (ICT)
- 2019: Honorary citizen of Sarajevo

Diplomatic posts
| Preceded by The Lord Ashdown of Norton-sub-Hamdon | High Representative for Bosnia and Herzegovina; 2006–2007 | Succeeded by Miroslav Lajčák |
