= Gerhard Stoltenberg =

German politician (1928-2001)

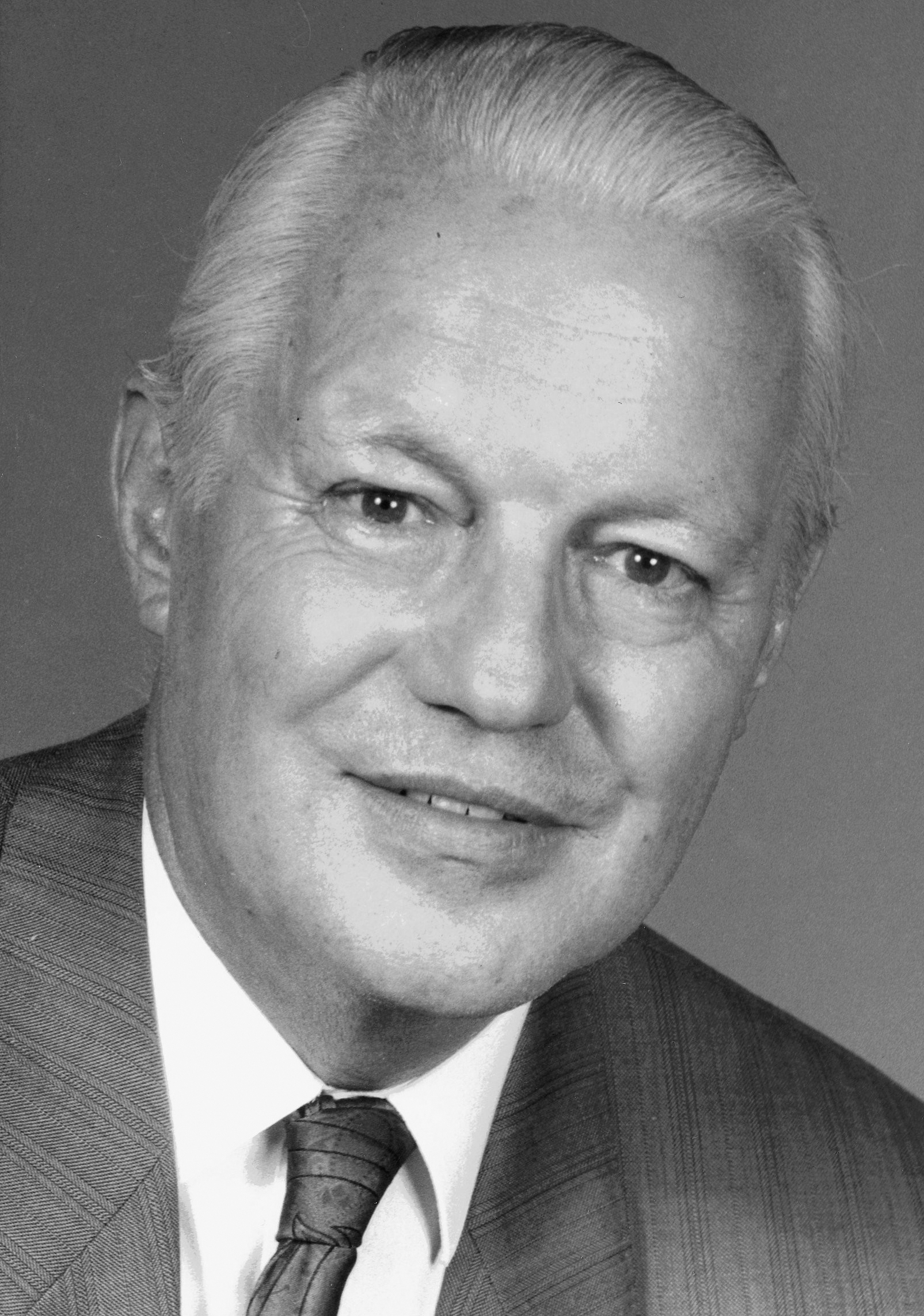
- Stoltenberg as Minister of Defence

Minister of Defence
- In office 21 April 1989 – 1 April 1992
- Chancellor: Helmut Kohl
- Preceded by: Rupert Scholz
- Succeeded by: Volker Rühe

Minister of Finance
- In office 4 October 1982 – 21 April 1989
- Chancellor: Helmut Kohl
- Preceded by: Manfred Lahnstein
- Succeeded by: Theodor Waigel

Minister-President of Schleswig-Holstein
- In office 24 May 1971 – 4 October 1982
- Preceded by: Helmut Lemke
- Succeeded by: Uwe Barschel

Minister of Scientific Research
- In office 26 October 1965 – 21 October 1969
- Preceded by: Hans Lenz
- Succeeded by: Hans Leussink

President of the Bundesrat
- In office 1 November 1977 – 31 October 1978
- Preceded by: Bernhard Vogel
- Succeeded by: Dietrich Stobbe

Personal details
- Born: 29 September 1928 Kiel, Germany
- Died: 23 November 2001 (aged 73) Bad Godesberg, Germany
- Party: Christian Democratic Union (CDU)
- Education: University of Kiel
- Profession: Historian

Gerhard Stoltenberg (29 September 1928 – 23 November 2001) was a German politician of the Christian Democratic Union (CDU) and minister in the cabinets of Ludwig Erhard, Kurt Georg Kiesinger and Helmut Kohl. He served as Minister-President of Schleswig-Holstein from 1971 to 1982 and as President of the Bundesrat from 1977 to 1978.

== Life ==
=== Early life and career ===
Stoltenberg was born in Kiel in northern Germany. In 1944 he became a navy assistant (HJ-Marinehelfer), a Hitler Youth auxiliary in the Kriegsmarine. After the war, when he was no longer a prisoner of war, he completed his Abitur in 1949. Stoltenberg began studying history, sociology and philosophy at the University of Kiel. In 1954 he graduated as a Doctor of Philosophy and worked as an academic in Kiel. In 1960 he became a professor (Privatdozent). In the years 1965 and from 1969 to 1970, Stoltenberg was the director of Friedrich Krupp GmbH in Essen.

=== Political career ===
Since 1947 Stoltenberg had been member of the CDU. In the years 1955 to 1961, he was federal leader of the Junge Union, the youth organisation of the CDU. From 1955 Stoltenberg had different positions in the CDU. From 1971 until 1989, he was chairman of the CDU in the state of Schleswig-Holstein. Moreover, Stoltenberg served as vice chairman of the federal CDU since 1969.

Stoltenberg was member of the state parliament of Schleswig-Holstein from 1954 to 1957, and from 1971 to 1982. From 1957 to 1971, and from 1983 until 1998, Stoltenberg also served as a member of the federal German legislature, the Bundestag. As a junior member of parliament and member of the Budget Committee of the Bundestag, he was the first to introduce to the 1959 federal budget a flat grant of DM 5,000,000 for political education (training of party activists) to be transferred to federal party headquarters.

On 24 May 1971, Stoltenberg was elected minister-president of the state of Schleswig-Holstein and remained in this position until 1982.

In 1982, he became federal minister of finance under chancellor Helmut Kohl. He left this position when he was appointed minister of defence from 1989 on, replacing Rupert Scholz. He resigned from this position on 31 March 1992.

Stoltenberg died in Bad Godesberg in 2001.

== Personal life ==
Stoltenberg was married and had two children. He was a member of the Lutheran church.

== See also ==
- List of minister-presidents of Schleswig-Holstein

Political offices
Preceded by Rupert Scholz	Federal Minister of Defence (Germany); 1989 – 1992	Succeeded by Volker Rühe
