= Rainer Barzel =

German politician (1924–2006)

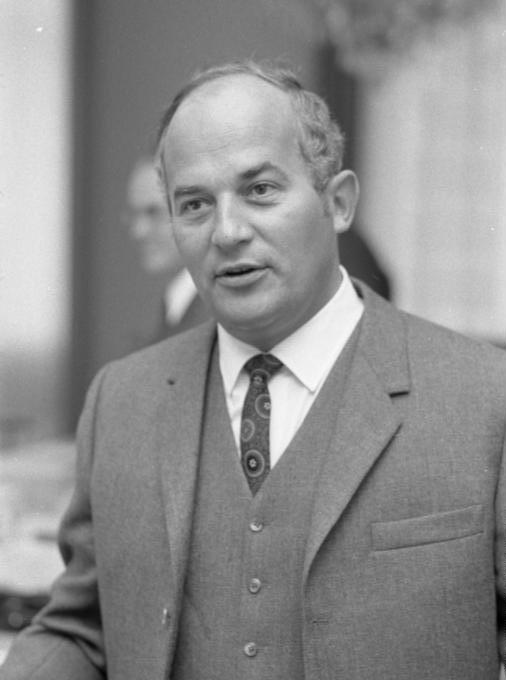
- Barzel in 1962

President of the Bundestag West Germany
- In office 29 March 1983 – 25 October 1984
- Preceded by: Richard Stücklen
- Succeeded by: Philipp Jenninger

Federal Minister of Intra-German Relations
- In office 4 October 1982 – 29 March 1983
- Chancellor: Helmut Kohl
- Preceded by: Egon Franke
- Succeeded by: Heinrich Windelen
- In office 14 December 1962 – 11 October 1963; All-German Affairs
- Chancellor: Konrad Adenauer
- Preceded by: Ernst Lemmer
- Succeeded by: Erich Mende

Leader of the Christian Democratic Union
- In office 5 October 1971 – 12 June 1973
- General Secretary: Kurt Biedenkopf
- Preceded by: Kurt Georg Kiesinger
- Succeeded by: Helmut Kohl

Leader of the CDU/CSU Group in the Bundestag
- In office 1 December 1964 – 9 May 1973
- First Deputy: Franz Josef Strauß; Richard Stücklen
- Preceded by: Heinrich von Brentano
- Succeeded by: Karl Carstens

Member of the Bundestag for North Rhine-Westphalia
- In office 4 November 1980 – 18 February 1987
- Constituency: Party-list proportional representation

Member of the Bundestag for Paderborn – Wiedenbrück
- In office 15 October 1957 – 4 November 1980
- Preceded by: Maria Niggemeyer
- Succeeded by: Heinrich Pohlmeier

Personal details
- Born: Rainer Candidus Barzel; 20 June 1924 Braunsberg, East Prussia, Germany (Weimar Republic)
- Died: 26 August 2006 (aged 82) Munich, Bavaria, Germany
- Party: Christian Democratic Union
- Spouses: Kriemhild Kölner (m. 1948; died 1980) Helga Henselder (m. 1983; died 1995) Ute Cremer (m. 1997)
- Children: 1
- Education: University of Cologne

Rainer Candidus Barzel (20 June 1924 – 26 August 2006) was a German politician of the Christian Democratic Union (CDU). He served as the eighth president of the Bundestag from 1983 to 1984.

Barzel had been the leader of his parliamentary group and a short time federal minister, before his party went into opposition in 1969. Subsequently, Barzel became chairman of the party. He tried to become federal chancellor via a constructive vote of no confidence in 1972, leading the first such attempt in the Federal Republic. He unexpectedly came two votes short. In the subsequent general elections of November 1972, he was the unsuccessful main candidate of the CDU/CSU. He lost his chairmanship the year after but remained an influential member of the parliament.

== Biography ==
Born in Braunsberg, East Prussia (present-day Braniewo, Poland), Barzel served as Chairman of the CDU from 1971 to 1973 and ran as the CDU's candidate for Chancellor of Germany in the 1972 federal elections, losing to Willy Brandt's SPD.

Barzel served as Minister of All-German Affairs (1962–63) under Konrad Adenauer, as Parliamentary group leader of the CDU/CSU (1964–1973), as Minister of Intra-German Relations (1982–1983) in Helmut Kohl's cabinet, and as President of the Bundestag (1983–1984).

The 1972 election is commonly regarded as an indirect referendum on Chancellor Brandt's Ostpolitik (Eastern Policy), which called for normalized relations with East Germany and the Soviet Union, which Barzel vehemently opposed. On 27 April 1972 Barzel and the CDU/CSU tabled a constructive vote of no confidence against Brandt's government. Due to several SPD and FDP members switching to the CDU and a number of FDP members withdrawing support for the coalition, on paper the CDU had just enough support to oust Brandt and make Barzel Chancellor of Germany.

The implications of this vote were far-reaching. Brandt's initial reaction was that he, along with his policy of Ostpolitik, was finished. Several German trade unions went on strike in anticipation of his loss in the no-confidence motion. However, in the final tally, the motion received 247 votes, two short of the 249 needed to expel Brandt from office. Persuasive evidence subsequently emerged that two members of Barzel's caucus, Julius Steiner (CDU) and Leo Wagner (CSU) had been bribed by the East German Ministry for State Security. (Note: "I recalled the CDU politician Julius Steiner from Baden-Württemberg, who had developed into a moderately useful information source, and received regular monetary amounts for that. I booked 50,000 marks from our accounts in order to prompt Steimer to oppose the no confidence vote." "Ich erinnerte mich an den CDU-Parlamentarier Julius Steiner aus Baden-Württemberg, der sich zu einer mittelmäßigen Informationsquelle entwickelt hatte und dafür regelmäßige Geldzuwendungen bekam,110 ich stellte aus unserer Kasse 50 000 DM zur Verfügung, um Steiner zur Stimmabgabe gegen das Misstrauensvotum zu bewegen." Markus Wolf, the former Stasi espionage chief, quoted by Daniela Münkel) Details of the alleged East German involvement remain hazy, however: not all commentators are persuaded that East German bribes were the most decisive factor in the tantalisingly narrow failure of the no-confidence vote.

The government, in consideration of the fact that it had lost its effective parliamentary majority and that parliamentary work was stalled, reacted by deliberately losing a vote of confidence, which then allowed President Gustav Heinemann to dissolve the Bundestag and call early elections, which Brandt and the SPD handily won. 1972 was the only time between the war and German reunification that saw the SPD place first in a federal German election, and it still represents the SPD's high-water mark in vote share. That year's elections had the highest turnout of any German federal election at 91.1%, one of the highest turnouts ever recorded in national elections without mandatory voting.

Within the CDU group of the German parliament, Barzel's credibility suffered when it became apparent that he had lied about substantial outside income from work as a lawyer outside parliament.

It was neither the lost no-confidence motion nor the lost parliamentary elections that, on 8 May 1973, eventually prompted Barzel to resign from both the CDU party chair and the leadership of the CDU/CSU parliamentary group. It was the refusal by the parliamentary group to support a government bill for the accession of both German states to the United Nations. He was the first leader of the CDU who stood down without ever becoming Chancellor.

In 1982, Barzel married the political scientist Helga Henselder-Barzel.

Barzel retired from political life in 1984 after he was accused of being entangled in the Flick affair, a charge rejected by the Flick inquiry committee and the prosecuting authorities two years later.

Barzel died in Munich, Bavaria, after a long illness, on 26 August 2006, aged 82.

== Publications ==
- Gesichtspunkte eines Deutschen. Düsseldorf, Econ 1968
- Unterwegs – Woher und wohin? München, Droemer Knaur 1982
- Im Streit und umstritten. Anmerkungen zu Konrad Adenauer, Ludwig Erhard und den Ostverträgen. Berlin, Ullstein 1986
- Geschichten aus der Politik. Persönliches aus meinem Archiv. Berlin, Ullstein 1987
- Die Tür blieb offen – Ostverträge-Misstrauensvotum-Kanzlersturz. Bonn, Bouvier 1998, ISBN 3-416-02836-8
- Ein gewagtes Leben. Stuttgart, Hohenheim 2001, ISBN 3-89850-041-1
