= Horst Ehmke =

German lawyer, law professor and politician (1927–2017)

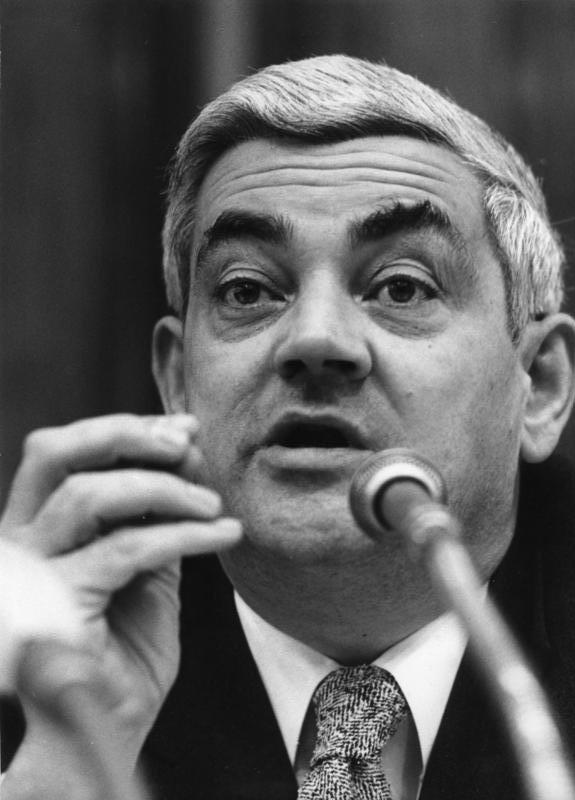
- Horst Ehmke in 1973

Federal Minister of Post and Telecommunications
- In office 15 December 1972 – 16 May 1974
- Preceded by: Lauritz Lauritzen
- Succeeded by: Kurt Gscheidle

Federal Minister of Justice
- In office 26 March 1969 – 22 October 1969
- Preceded by: Gustav Heinemann
- Succeeded by: Gerhard Jahn

Chief of the Federal Chancellery
- In office 22 October 1969 – 15 December 1972
- Preceded by: Karl Carstens
- Succeeded by: Horst Grabert

Federal Minister of Research, Technology, and Post
- In office 15 December 1972 – 7 May 1974
- Preceded by: Lauritz Lauritzen
- Succeeded by: Kurt Gscheidle

Personal details
- Born: Horst Paul August Ehmke; 4 February 1927 Free City of Danzig
- Died: 12 March 2017 (aged 90) Bonn
- Party: SPD
- Occupation: Professor of law

Horst Paul August Ehmke (4 February 1927 – 12 March 2017) was a German lawyer, law professor and politician of the Social Democratic Party (SPD). He served as Federal Minister of Justice (1969), Chief of Staff at the German Chancellery and Federal Minister for Special Affairs (1969–1972) and Federal Minister for Research, Technology, and Post (1972–1974).

== Life ==
Ehmke was born in the Free City of Danzig, where he passed his Abitur. In 1944, at the age of 17, Ehmke was enrolled as a member of the Nazi Party, although when this became public knowledge in 2007 as part of a media investigation of Nazi archives, he stated that he had made no application and was previously unaware of the enrollment. Following the Expulsion of Germans after World War II he came as a refugee to western Germany. He studied Law and Economics in Göttingen and Political science and History at Princeton University (US) from 1949 to 1950. In 1952, he promoted as Dr. iur., and in 1956, he passed his final examinations. In these years, he was the assistant of Adolf Arndt, member of the Bundestag (SPD).

From 1956 to 1960, Ehmke became a member of the Ford Foundation in Cologne and Berkeley. After passing his Habilitation in 1960, he became professor of public law at the University of Freiburg, where he became the Dean. From 1963 on, Ehmke was ordinary professor and held the chair of Law at this university. Since 1974, he was accredited as a lawyer.

Ehmke was married and had three children.

== Political career ==
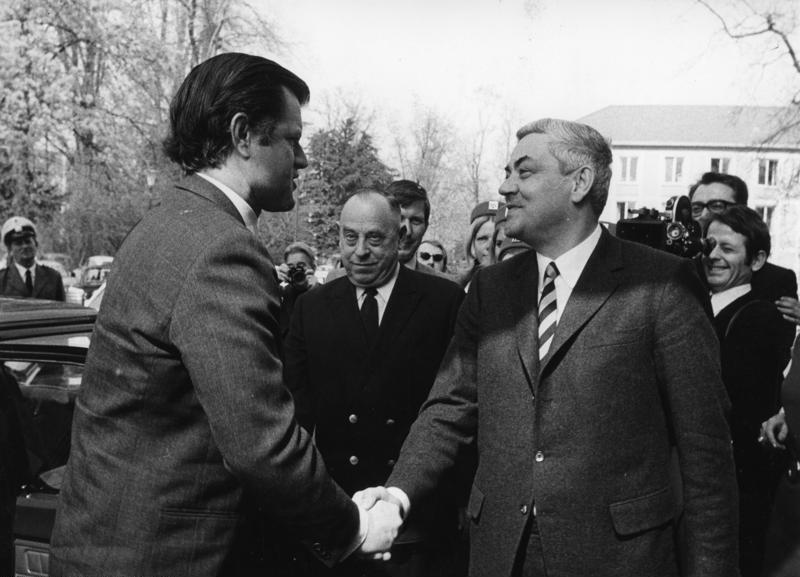
Chief of Staff Horst Ehmke greeting Senator Ted Kennedy in Bonn, April 1971

Since 1947, Ehmke has been a member of the SPD, where he was a member of the executive board from 1973 to 1991. He was a member of the Bundestag from 1969 to 1994 for the state of North Rhine-Westphalia. Here, he was deputy whip of the SPD faction from 1977 to 1990.

Ehmke was Federal Minister of Justice from to March to October 1969 before becoming Chief of Staff at the German Chancellery from 1969 to 1972 under Chancellor Willy Brandt, being simultaneously the Federal Minister for Special Affairs. After the 1972 West German federal election he moved to become Federal Minister for Research, Technology and Post, until he was replaced in May 1974 by Hans Matthöfer. Ehmke died on 12 March 2017 at the age of 90.

== Writings ==
- Grenzen der Verfassungsänderung, 1953
- Politik der praktischen Vernunft – Aufsätze und Referate, 1969
- Politik als Herausforderung. Reden – Vorträge – Aufsätze 1968–1974, 1974
- Politik als Herausforderung. Reden – Vorträge – Aufsätze 1975–1979, 1979
- Beiträge zur Verfassungstheorie und Verfassungspolitik, 1981
- Mittendrin – Von der Großen Koalition zur Deutschen Einheit, 1994

After retiring, Ehmke also wrote detective stories revolving around politics:

- Global Players, 1998
- Der Euro-Coup, 1999
- Himmelsfackeln, 2001
- Privatsache, 2003
- Im Schatten der Gewalt, 2006
