= Werner Dollinger =

German politician and economist

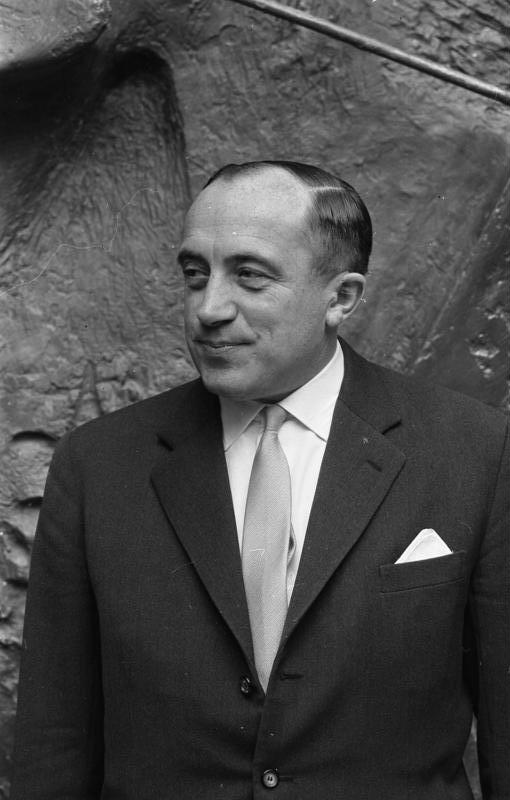
- Dollinger in 1963

Minister of Transport
- In office 4 October 1982 – 12 March 1987
- Chancellor: Helmut Kohl
- Preceded by: Volker Hauff
- Succeeded by: Jürgen Warnke

Minister of Post and Telecommunications
- In office 1 December 1966 – 21 October 1969
- Chancellor: Kurt Georg Kiesinger
- Preceded by: Richard Stücklen
- Succeeded by: Georg Leber

Minister of Economic Cooperation
- In office 28 October 1966 – 30 November 1966
- Chancellor: Ludwig Erhard
- Preceded by: Walter Scheel
- Succeeded by: Hans-Jürgen Wischnewski

Minister of the Treasury
- In office 14 December 1962 – 30 November 1966
- Chancellor: Konrad Adenauer; Ludwig Erhard
- Preceded by: Hans Lenz
- Succeeded by: Kurt Schmücker

Member of the Bundestag; from Bavaria
- In office 6 October 1953 – 20 December 1990
- Preceded by: Willibald Mücke
- Succeeded by: Christian Schmidt
- Constituency: Erlangen (1953–1965); Fürth (1965–1972); State list (1972–1976); Fürth (1976–1990)

Personal details
- Born: 10 October 1918 Neustadt an der Aisch, Germany
- Died: 3 January 2008 (aged 89) Neustadt an der Aisch, Germany
- Party: Christian Social Union
- Education: Goethe University Frankfurt

Werner Dollinger (10 October 1918 – 3 January 2008) was a German politician and economist, a member of the Christian Social Union in Bavaria (CSU). He served as Federal Minister for the Treasury from 1962 to 1966, Federal Minister for Economic Cooperation in 1966, Federal Minister of Post and Telecommunications from 1966 to 1969, and as Federal Minister of Transport from 1982 to 1987.

== Early life and education ==
Born in Neustadt an der Aisch in Middle Franconia, Dollinger studied economics and social sciences in Nuremberg, at the Goethe University Frankfurt and at the Technische Hochschule München. He obtained an MBA (Diplom-Kaufmann) degree in 1940 and two years later gained his doctorate. From 1943 to 1945, Dollinger served in the Wehrmacht armed forces during World War II.

Back in his hometown after the war, he joined his father-in-law's brickyard business. He became chairman of the local Chamber of Commerce in 1948 and of the Middle Franconian clay industry association in 1952. As a Protestant, Dollinger was a synod member of the Evangelical Lutheran Church in Bavaria from 1965 to 1995 and of the Evangelical Church in Germany from 1971 to 1991.

== Political career ==
In 1946 Dollinger was one of the founding members of the Christian Social Union branch in Neustadt an der Aisch. He was elected city councillor and deputy in the district assembly. He also acted as CSU district chairman from 1951 to 1972, as a councillor in the party's district committee, and joined the state executive in 1957. At the 1953 federal elections, Dollinger was elected to the West German Bundestag parliament. He joined the CDU/CSU group executive committee, became vice chairman in 1957 and head of the CSU regional group in 1961. Re-elected several times, he remained a Bundestag MP until 1990. In 1956 he also joined the Common Assembly of the European Coal and Steel Community.

On 14 December 1962 Dollinger was appointed Federal Minister for the Treasury in the last cabinet of Chancellor Konrad Adenauer, an office he retained under Adenauer's successor Ludwig Erhard. In 1966 he also served as Minister for Economic Cooperation, after Minister Walter Scheel and his FDP cabinet colleagues had resigned. In the succeeding grand coalition cabinet of Chancellor Kurt Georg Kiesinger, Dollinger was appointed Federal Minister of Post and Telecommunications. He lost his office when Willy Brandt formed the social–liberal coalition after the 1969 federal elections.

13 years later, Dollinger once again entered the Federal Government, when he was appointed Federal Minister of Transport in the cabinet of Chancellor Helmut Kohl on 4 October 1982. He finally retired after the 1987 elections. He died at his home in Neustadt an der Aisch.

== Honours ==
- Bavarian Order of Merit (1961)
- Grand Cross of Merit with Star of the Federal Republic of Germany (1969)
- Grand Decoration of Honour in Gold with Sash for Services to the Republic of Austria (1969)
- Grand Cross of Merit with Star and Sash of the Federal Republic of Germany (1973)
