= Hans Matthöfer =

German politician (1925–2009)

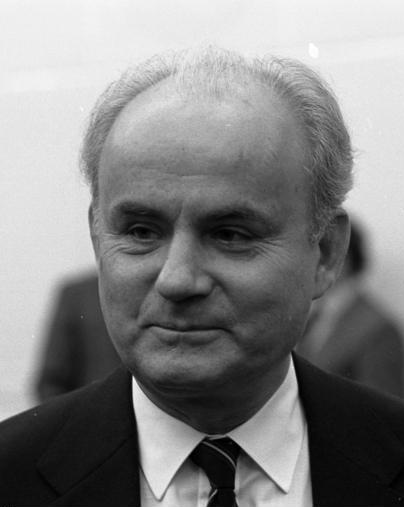
- Matthöfer in 1981

Minister of Post and Telecommunications
- In office 28 April 1982 – 4 October 1982
- Chancellor: Helmut Schmidt
- Preceded by: Kurt Gscheidle
- Succeeded by: Christian Schwarz-Schilling

Minister of Finance
- In office 16 February 1978 – 28 April 1982
- Chancellor: Helmut Schmidt
- Preceded by: Hans Apel
- Succeeded by: Manfred Lahnstein

Minister of Research and Technology
- In office 16 May 1974 – 16 February 1978
- Chancellor: Helmut Schmidt
- Preceded by: Horst Ehmke
- Succeeded by: Volker Hauff

Member of the Bundestag; from Hesse
- In office 17 October 1961 – 18 February 1987
- Preceded by: Franz Böhm
- Succeeded by: Multi-member district
- Constituency: Frankfurt/M III (1961–1965); Frankfurt III (1965–1976); Frankfurt am Main III (1976–1983); State list (1983–1987)

Personal details
- Born: Hans Hermann Matthöfer; 25 September 1925 Bochum, Germany
- Died: 14 November 2009 (aged 84) Berlin, Germany
- Party: Social Democratic

Hans Hermann Matthöfer (25 September 1925 – 14 November 2009) was a German politician of the Social Democratic Party (SPD). He served as a minister in various portfolios, including Minister of Finance from 1978 to 1982.

== Early life and education ==
Hans Hermann Matthöfer was born in Bochum on 25 September 1925, Matthöfer served an apprenticeship in commercial science before being drafted as a soldier in the Second World War between 1943 and 1945.

He began some self-study in languages (passing an examination as an English interpreter), politics, and economics, in a bid to explain Germany's demise. He then began formal studies at the University of Frankfurt on Main, where from 1949 to 1951, he chaired the Social Democratic students' organisation. He spent two terms at the University of Wisconsin–Madison in the United States. In 1953, he received his Bachelor of Economics degree.

== Career ==
After his return to Germany, Matthöfer began work in the department of economics for the workers union IG Metall, followed by four years at the Organisation for European Economic Co-operation in Washington, D.C., and Paris. After his return to Germany he again worked for the IG Metall and developed a program for the education in companies as well as tariff policy. Between 1987 and 1997 he was president of the BGAG, an investment company owned by the workers union.

Matthöfer joined the Social Democratic party of Germany in 1950. Between 1973 and 1984 he belonged to the Social Democratic party's executive board, followed by a position as its treasurer between 1985 and 1987.

Between 1974 and 1978 Matthöfer served as secretary of research and technology. In 1978 he took over as federal minister of finance and in 1982 he left that post and served briefly as Federal Minister of Post and Telecommunications. After his party lost power in 1983 he gave up all positions in the German government.

== Personal life, death and legacy ==
Matthöfer married Traute Mecklenburg, a nurse from Stettin who later became a social worker, in 1951. In 1995, they both established a trust to provide scholarships for young people wanting to research in the areas of their interest, such as trade union issues and international cooperation. Mecklenburg died in 2008.

Matthöfer died in the spa town of Bad Soden am Taunus on 15 November 2009.

In 2015, the Friedrich Ebert Foundation established the Hans Matthöfer Prize for Economic Journalism (Hans-Matthöfer-Preis für Wirtschaftspublicizistik).
