= Lauritz Lauritzen =

German politician (1910–1980)

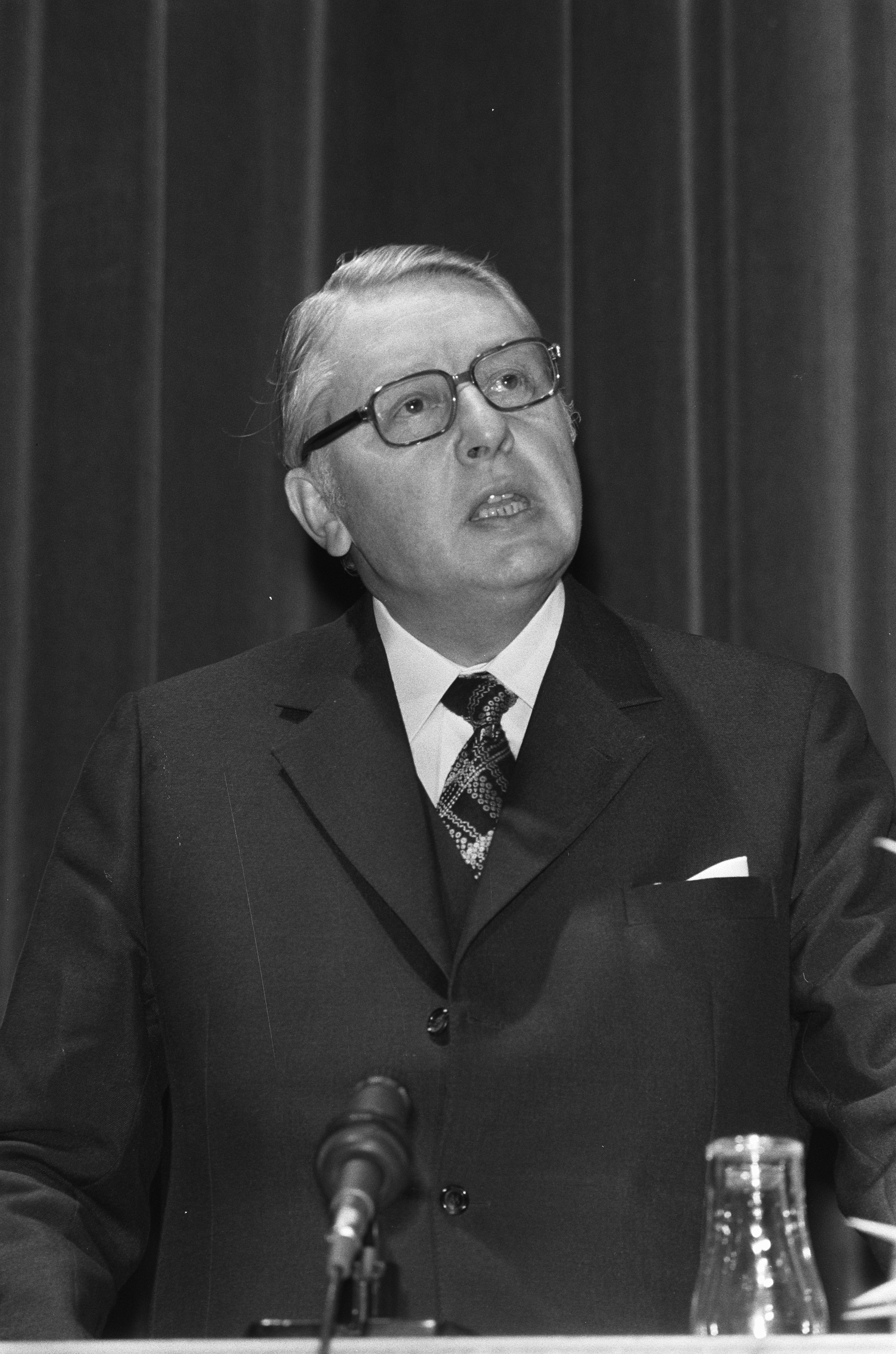
- Lauritzen in 1973

Federal Minister of Transport
- In office 7 July 1972 – 7 May 1974
- Preceded by: Georg Leber
- Succeeded by: Kurt Gscheidle

Federal Minister of Post and Telecommunications
- In office 7 July 1972 – 15 December 1972
- Preceded by: Georg Leber
- Succeeded by: Horst Ehmke

Federal Minister of Urban Development and Housing
- In office 1 December 1966 – 15 December 1972
- Preceded by: Bruno Heck
- Succeeded by: Hans-Jochen Vogel

Personal details
- Born: 20 January 1910; Kiel, Prussia, German Reich
- Died: 5 June 1980 (aged 70); Bad Honnef, West Germany
- Political party: Social Democratic Party of Germany (SPD)

Lauritz Lauritzen (20 January 1910 – 5 June 1980) was a German politician of the Social Democratic Party of Germany (SPD). He was born in Kiel and died in Bad Honnef.

== Life and career ==
Lauritzen studied Law at the universities of Freiburg and Kiel and earned a doctorate (Dr. iur, equivalent to S.J.D.). After working as a high ranking civil servant at the Ministry of the Interior of the German Federal State of Lower Saxony, Lauritzen became mayor of Kassel. In 1963 he joined the Hessian government as Minister of Justice and Federal Affairs. A possible candidacy as Minister President of Hesse, was obstructed by an affair concerning donations to a football club.

After the election to the Bundestag in 1966, Chancellor Kurt Georg Kiesinger appointed Lauritzen as Federal Minister of Housing and Urban Development. After the election of 1969, the name of the ministry was changed to Ministry of Urban Development and Housing. On 7 July 1972, Lauritzen additionally became head of the Ministries of Transport and of Post and Telecommunication. From 15 December 1972 on, he headed only the Ministry of Transport. His predecessor at the Transport Ministry, Georg Leber, triggered press and public opposition by implementing a blanket 100 km/h speed limit on major roads, but not on Autobahnen. In support of his predecessor's action, Lauritzen in August 1972 repeated his conviction that speed limits served the cause of traffic safety. During the 1973 oil crisis Lauritzen took the opportunity to implement a general speed limit of 100 km/h (subsequently withdrawn) on German autobahns. He left the cabinet on 7 May 1974 upon the resignation of Chancellor Willy Brandt.
