= Kurt Gscheidle =

German politician (1924–2003)

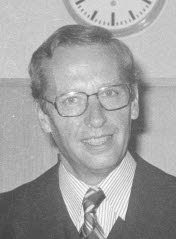
- Gscheidle in 1975

Minister of Post and Telecommunications
- In office 16 May 1974 – 28 April 1982
- Chancellor: Helmut Schmidt
- Preceded by: Horst Ehmke
- Succeeded by: Hans Matthöfer

Minister of Transport
- In office 16 May 1974 – 4 November 1980
- Chancellor: Helmut Schmidt
- Preceded by: Lauritz Lauritzen
- Succeeded by: Volker Hauff

Member of the Bundestag
- In office 14 December 1976 – 4 November 1980
- Constituency: North Rhine-Westphalia state list
- In office 17 October 1961 – 7 November 1969
- Preceded by: Berthold Martin
- Succeeded by: Peter Säckl
- Constituency: Obertaunuskreis (1961–1965); Hesse state list (1965–1969)

Personal details
- Born: 16 December 1924 Stuttgart, Germany
- Died: 22 February 2003 (aged 78) Saarbrücken, Germany
- Party: Social Democratic
- Occupation: Engineer

Kurt Gscheidle (16 December 1924 – 22 February 2003) was a German politician affiliated to the Social Democratic Party (SPD).

Gscheidle trained as a mechanic with the Deutsche Reichspost until 1942, when he was called up by the Wehrmacht. In 1948 he returned from war captivity, began studies at the Dortmund Social Academy and graduated as an engineer. In 1953 Gscheidle became an official of the Deutsche Bundespost labor union and was elected vice-chairman in 1957. He had joined the SPD in 1956, from 1961 until 1969 and again from 1976 to 1980 he was a member of the Bundestag.

In 1969 Gscheidle was a nominee for Chairman of the German Confederation of Trade Unions (DGB) but had to step down in favour of Heinz Oskar Vetter. He then served as a secretary of state at the Federal Ministry of Post and Telecommunications and from 1974 as Federal Minister of Transport (until 1980) and Federal Minister of Post and Telecommunications (until 1982) under Helmut Schmidt in the latter's three terms as Federal Chancellor.

== Gscheidle stamp ==
Gscheidle is known among philatelists for a stamp designed on the occasion of the 1980 Summer Olympics in Moscow. As West Germany participated in the Olympics boycott the stamp was never issued, however Gscheidle, then Minister of Post had received some proofs which he kept after his incumbency. From 1982 to 1983 his wife erroneously used about 24 of these stamps for her private correspondence, which today realize peak prices at auctions. In October 2010, one of the Gscheidle stamps was sold for 26,000 euros in Düsseldorf, Germany.
