= Georg Leber =

German politician (1920–2012)

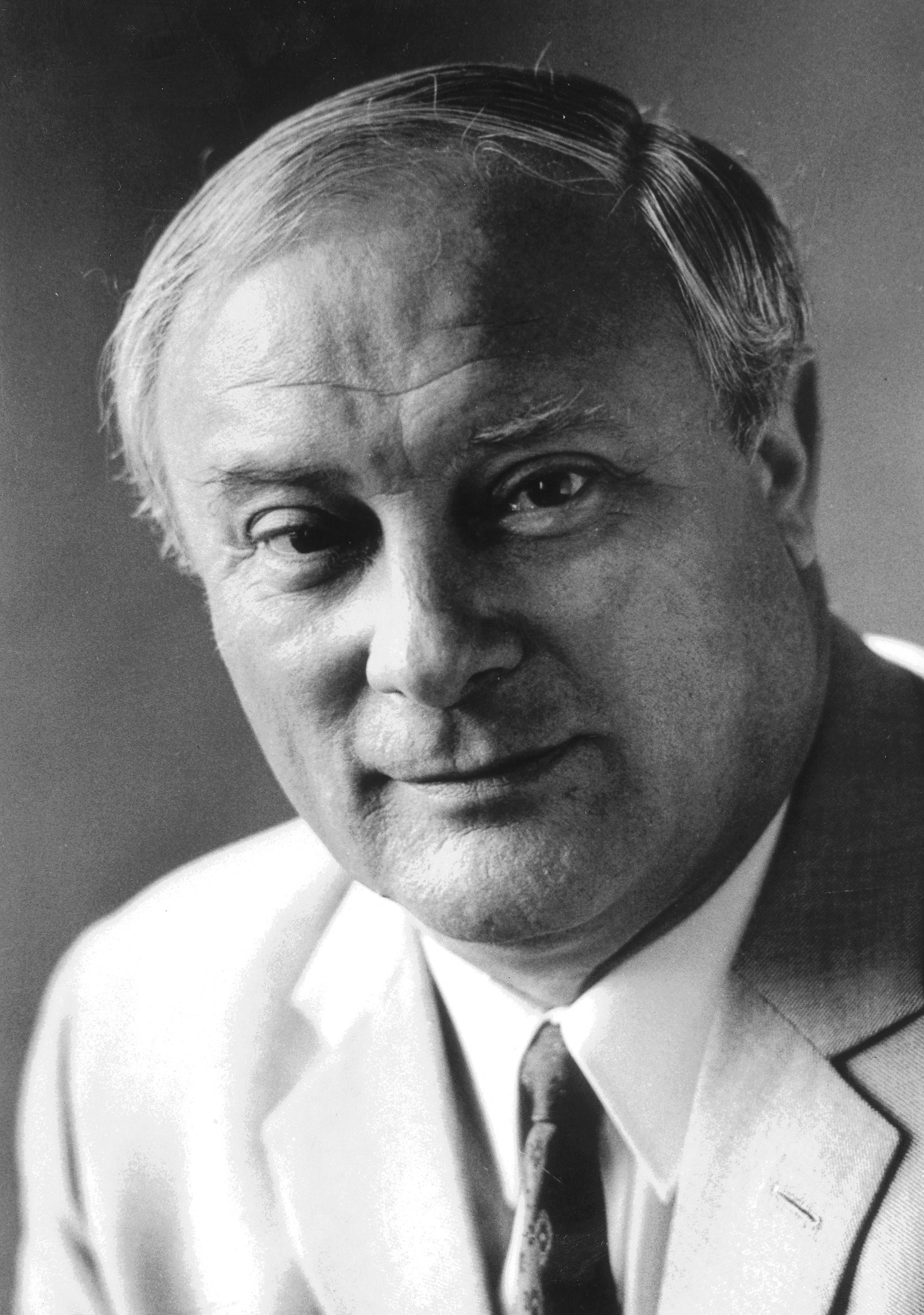
- Leber in 1974

Vice President of the Bundestag (on proposal of the SPD faction)
- In office 12 September 1979 – 29 March 1983
- President: Richard Stücklen
- Preceded by: Hermann Schmitt-Vockenhausen
- Succeeded by: Heinz Westphal

Minister of Defence
- In office 7 July 1972 – 1 February 1978
- Chancellor: Willy Brandt; Helmut Schmidt
- Preceded by: Helmut Schmidt
- Succeeded by: Hans Apel

Minister of Post and Telecommunications
- In office 21 October 1969 – 7 July 1972
- Chancellor: Willy Brandt
- Preceded by: Werner Dollinger
- Succeeded by: Lauritz Lauritzen

Minister of Transport
- In office 1 December 1966 – 7 July 1972
- Chancellor: Kurt Georg Kiesinger; Willy Brandt
- Preceded by: Hans-Christoph Seebohm
- Succeeded by: Lauritz Lauritzen

Member of the Bundestag; from Hesse
- In office 15 October 1957 – 29 March 1983
- Constituency: State list (1957–1961); Frankfurt/M I (1961–1965); Frankfurt I (1965–1976); State list (1976–1983)

Personal details
- Born: 7 October 1920 Obertiefenbach (Beselich), Germany
- Died: 21 August 2012 (aged 91) Schönau am Königssee, Germany
- Party: Social Democratic
- Spouse(s): Erna-Maria Wilfing (m. 1943; died 1984) Katja Vojta (m. 1985)
- Profession: Bricklayer

Military service
- Allegiance: Nazi Germany
- Branch/service: Luftwaffe
- Rank: Unteroffizier
- Battles/wars: World War II

Georg Leber (7 October 1920 – 21 August 2012) was a German Trades Union leader and a politician in the Social Democratic Party of Germany (SPD).

== Biography ==
Leber was born in Obertiefenbach (Beselich), Hesse. After serving as radio operator in the Luftwaffe (the German air force) in World War II, he joined the SPD in 1947. In 1957, he was elected to the Bundestag, which he was a member of until 1983, representing Frankfurt am Main I.

In 1966, Leber was appointed minister for transportation for the grand coalition. He kept this position and became minister for postal service and long-distance communication under the joint SPD-FDP administration. In 1972, he gave up both positions and became minister of defence. Under his ministership the Bundeswehr was expanded and the Universities of the Bundeswehr were founded in Munich and Hamburg. In 1978, he left his position after a controversy in the defense ministry involving eavesdropping. From 1979 until 1983 he was the Deputy Speaker of the Bundestag.

Leber quit politics in 1986, and with his wife retired to the Bavarian countryside. From 1990 to 1993, he was a member of the Advisory Board of the Bertelsmann Stiftung.

Leber died in his hometown of Schönau on 21 August 2012.

Political offices
Preceded by Helmut Schmidt	Federal Minister of Defence (Germany); 1972–1978	Succeeded by Hans Apel
