= Johannes-Wilhelm Rörig =

German civil servant and jurist

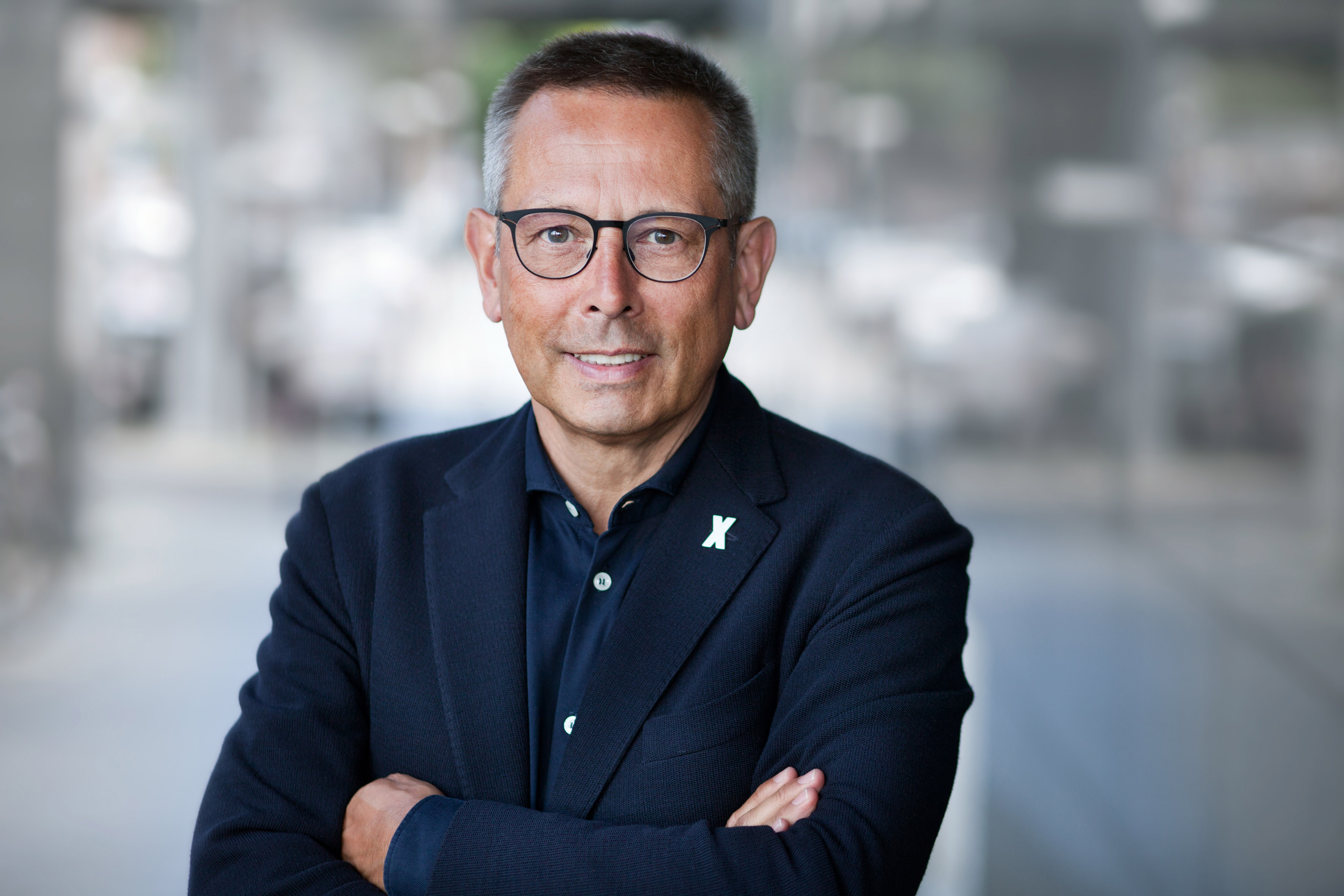
Rörig in 2018

Johannes-Wilhelm Rörig (born 25 October 1959) is a German Manager ("Betriebswirt"), Full jurist ("Volljurist"), Labour law judge and Senior Public Administrator ("Ministerialdirigent"). Since December 2011 he has served as the Independent Commission for Dealing with Sexual Abuse of Children ("der Unabhängiger Beauftragter für Fragen des sexuellen Kindesmissbrauchs").

== Life ==
Johannes-Wilhelm Rörig was born in Kassel. He passed his school leaving exams, focusing on Economics and Administration (Fachabitur Wirtschaft und Verwaltung) in 1978, which opened the way to tertiary education. He attended the Technical University of Cologne, emerging in 1982 with a degree in Business Administration. He passed his lower level public law exams in Berlin in 1988. In 1990 he was appointed bureau chief for Christine Bergmann, the (hitherto East German) president of the Berlin City Council and "junior mayor" of the city. He passed his higher level public law exams in Berlin in 1991. At approximately the same Christine Bergmann became junior mayor of Berlin time he took over as chief of her office in the Berlin senate. In 1993 he became a probationary judge at the Berlin Labour Court: in 1996 he became a full judge.

In 1998 he was appointed to a position in the Federal (i.e. national) Ministry of Family Affairs, Senior Citizens, Women and Youth. He worked in the Department for Children and Young People from 1998 as Bergmann's bureau chief, between 2000 and 2009 as head of the central department and between 2009 and 2011 in the sub-department for Children and Young People In December 2011 he was appointed the Independent Commission for Dealing with Sexual Abuse of Children ("der Unabhängiger Beauftragter für Fragen des sexuellen Kindesmissbrauchs ").

== As independent commissioner ==
Johannes-Wilhelm Rörig's appointment was renewed for a further five years by a cabinet resolution of the government on 26 March 2014. His responsibilities were essentially those proviuded for in the various recommendations of the Round-table working group on "Abuse of Children covering Dependency and Power relationships whether public or private, and within the family" (Runder Tisch "Sexueller Kindesmissbrauch in Abhängigkeits- und Machtverhältnissen in privaten und öffentlichen Einrichtungen und im familiären Bereich"). Particular emphasis was to be placed on the introduction and further development of ideas for protection against sexual violence in institutions. He was also mandated to introduce and safeguard independent handling for cases of sexual abuse of children in Germany and to provide relevant public information.

The Ministerialdirigent performs his duties independently. He is not constrained by instructions or directives, nor subject to any expert oversight body. In administrative terms he operates from within the Federal Ministry of Family Affairs, Senior Citizens, Women and Youth.

In May 2014 reports surfaced of a complaint from the Berlin Administrative Court that Rörig's appointment, along with two others also made under the auspices of the Federal Ministry of Family Affairs, had not been made lawfully. The appointments, made when Kristina Schröder was still the responsible minister, had been made without proper compliance under the requirements of the Equal Opportunities Law, because the Equal Opportunities Authority had not been timely informed of them. The other two instances also involved appointments of men: ministerial spokesman Christoph Steegmans and administrative secretary of state Lutz Stroppe. The court expressed a concern that the ministerial misfeasances highlighted might be repeated and should not be.

== Personal ==
Rörig is married and has two children.
