= Gabriele Schöttler =

Gabriele Schöttler is a former East German nurse who switched to political activism, joining the Social Democratic Party during the final weeks of 1989, and then successfully switching to mainstream politics following reunification the next year. In the course of a varied political career she served between 1999 and 2001 as the Berlin senator for labour, social affairs and women under Mayors Diepgen and Wowereit.

== Life and career ==
=== Provenance and early years ===
Gabriele Schöttler was born, a few months after the 1953 uprising, in Zehdenick, a small town and an important centre for brick production, set in the marshy flatlands roughly 50 km to the north of Berlin. She completed her school education at an East German "Polytechnic Secondary School" in 1970 and then transferred to the Medical College and Berlin-Buch where between 1970 and 1974 she trained and qualified for a nursing career. She then worked as a nurse at the Neurology Clinic in Berlin-Buch between 1974 and 1977. In 1977 she was promoted to the rank of a "deputy station sister" ("stellvertretende Stationsschwester"), continuing her work in the clinic at this level till 1979.

An abrupt change of career came in 1979 when she took a post as head of training and further education at the "VEB Elektromontage" manufacturing facility at Oranienburg on the northern edge of Berlin. She worked in this position till 1983. Between 1980 and 1984 she undertook a parallel distance-learning course in business administration and economics with the Business College at Dippoldiswalde. Schöttler continued to work at Oranienburg in the training department at "VEB Elektromontage" between 1984 and 1991, but now with an "Ingenieur-Ökonomin" degree to her name.

=== Politics ===
During the Autumn of changes in 1989 Gabriele Schöttler joined the Social Democratic Party (SDP). The SPD in East Germany had been subsumed into the ruling SED (party) in April 1946 by means of a contentious party merger that had opened the way for the creation of a Soviet sponsored one-party dictatorship. The superficial plurality of political parties after 1949 had comprised a collection Bloc parties, all closely controlled by the one ruling party. During the second half of 1989 many of the structural underpinnings of the one-party dictatorship were falling away, however. A separate East German Social Democratic Party was relaunched, formally on 7 October 1989. Schöttler joined it. It was almost certainly the first time she had ever been a member of any political party. During the next twelve months, as the apparatus of dictatorship continued to crumble, and the East German SDP progressively merged into the (hitherto "West German") Social Democratic Party (SPD), she undertook a succession of party functions at district and state level.

The East German general election of 18 March 1990 is widely seen as the first (and last) free and fair general election in the forty year history of the German Democratic Republic. For those who view history backwards it was also a step down the inevitable path to German reunification. Certainly over in Bonn Chancellor Kohl (who by this time enjoyed far more cordial relationship with Soviet party General Secretary Gorbachev than any member of the East German government leadership) already saw a clear road ahead whereby the forty years of German division might be ended. But in March 1990 there were still very few people in East or West Germany who foresaw realistic prospect of reunification. The realisation of what might become possible dawned on people only during the few months, however. There was nothing theoretical about the return of democracy to East Germany, and on 6 May 1990 Schöttler was elected to membership the East Berlin city assembly ("(Ost-)Berliner Stadtverordnetenversammlung"). By 11 July 1990, when this city parliament voted into force a constitution for East Berlin (to come into force on 23 July 1990) reunification was very much more clearly on the horizon, so that the East Berlin constitution was to be valid only for a six month transitional phase till January 1991, by which time it was anticipated that a longer term way ahead might be apparent. It was. Schöttler remained a member of the East Berlin city parliament till its replacement in December 1990.

=== Berlin reunited ===
The formal date of the reunification treaty was 3 October 1990. A couple of months later, on 2 December 1990, elections were held for a newly enlarged Berlin city parliament ("Abgeordnetenhaus"). The date was chosen because it was also the date selected for the first all-German national election since the Nazi show election of April 1938. In Berlin, once again a united city, Gabriele Schöttler was elected to the Berlin parliament as the SPD member for a city centre electoral district ("Wahlkreis Mitte 1" ). She remained a member for slightly more than ten years, representing central Berlin and serving between 1991 and 1995, and then again for a few months during 1998, as a deputy leader of the SPD group in the parliament.

=== Senator ===
In November 1998 she became a Berlin senator, taking the important portfolio encompassing labour, social affairs and women in the city administration of Mayor Eberhard Diepgen. She took the post in succession to Christine Bergmann, who had accepted an unexpected invitation from Chancellor Schröder to make a switch into national politics. The next year her participation in the Berlin state election became particularly memorable, thanks to the poster accompanying her campaign slogan, "Gabi - [a] stronger step for social justice" ("... starker Auftritt für soziale Gerechtigkeit"). The poster was a pointed response to the campaign poster of Mayor Diepgen, her senatorial boss but political opponent in the governing coalition: Diepgen in his own election publicity had used an image featuring running shoes, to illustrate his energetic approach to his senatorial and mayoral responsibilities. The image accompanying Schöttler's own slogan simply showed an elegant foot and ankle encased in an exceptionally high stiletto shoe, of which the spike was piercing the toe section of a running shoe containing - the viewer was presumably intended to infer - a foot. Schöttler's poster-slogan combination caught the attention of the national media. Gabriele Schöttler is a small woman, and much of the ensuing press reporting centred not on her agenda for social justice in Berlin, but on the nature and extent of her personal shoe collection. Reassuringly, it was reported that she owned "nowhere near as many shoes as Imelda Marcos", but there were nevertheless around 40 pairs (including plenty of shoes and winter boots with very high heels).

Despite the poster she retained her senatorial portfolio in Mayor Diepgen's following the 1999 election even though the election had delivered a small reduction in the SPD vote share, leading to a reduction in the number of senatorial seats allocated to it in the city's senate coalition. She also retained it when Mayor Diepgen was succeeded as mayor by her SPD colleague Klaus Wowerweit following the Berlin Bank scandal. However, the new administration proved unstable due to the underlying balance of seats in the Berlin parliament, and when fresh state elections were called for October 2001 she resigned her senate seat. Once the results were declared, it turned out that she had, in addition, failed to retain her seat in the city parliament, which went instead to a young university professor, Benjamin-Immanuel Hoff, of the PDS (party).

=== After politics? ===
Between 2002 and 2006 Schöttler headed up the "Sanssouci Business Academy", a recently opened private sector business school in Potsdam. Under her leadership the academy specialised in organising seminars for leaders from business and trades unions.

=== District mayor ===
In August 2005 it was reported that the party had approached her, requesting that she should apply to become the party candidate for the post of local mayor in Treptow-Köpenick, in political terms a district of Berlin with a rich and long-standing socialist tradition. Beyond her obvious qualities, there were hints that the party hierarchy had been underwhelmed by the number and/or quality of the candidates who had already applied to the party district association. The deadline for applications was still two months away, however. Schöttler's reaction was cautiously positive, "if that is what the comrades want". By the time the reports appeared, it turned out that several members of the party district association had already nominated her as the party's candidate to succeed the long-standing and popular (but by this point three years past the normal retirement age) district mayor, Klaus Ulbricht.

By the time of the local elections, which took place on 17 September 2006, Schöttler's name was at the top of the SPD party list for the Treptow-Köpenick district council, which effectively guaranteed her election to the council. Six weeks later the new council convened, and was then up to the members of the new council to vote for a district mayor. 43 of the 55 voting chose Gabriele Schöttler who accordingly was duly elected. Within the district council she also took a leadership role in respect of finance, economics, arts and culture, personnel matters and regulatory affairs. Gabriele Schöttler served out her full term as district mayor, remaining in post till 27 October 2009. A particular high point during her term of office was the 800 anniversary celebrations for Köpenick. Following her retirement it was reported that she remained engaged, in particular through her support for the welfare oriented "Köpenick social foundation" ("Sozialstiftung Köpenick").

== Personal ==
Gabriele Schöttler is married with a son, born in the mid 1970s.

Asked in 2009 how she spent her spare time she replied: "That belongs to my family". She added that she likes to spend time in her garden, and takes particular pleasure in reading crime-novels "provided it is not already clear from the beginning who the murderer was, as with Columbo".
