= Sascha Müller =

Sascha Müller may refer to:

- Sascha Müller (footballer)
- Sascha Müller (politician)
