= Hannelore Rönsch =

German politician (born 1942)

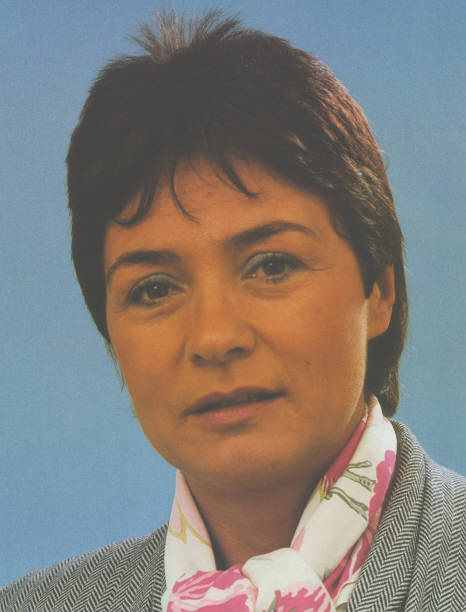
- Rönsch in 1995

Minister for Family and Senior Citizens
- In office 18 January 1991 – 17 November 1994
- Chancellor: Helmut Kohl
- Preceded by: Ursula Lehr
- Succeeded by: Claudia Nolte

Member of the Bundestag; from Hesse
- In office 29 March 1983 – 17 October 2002
- Preceded by: Rudi Schmitt
- Succeeded by: Multi-member district
- Constituency: Wiesbaden (1983–1998); State list (1998–2002)

Personal details
- Born: Hannelore Heinz; 12 December 1942 (age 83) Wiesbaden, Germany
- Party: Christian Democratic Union
- Children: 1

Hannelore Rönsch (née Heinz; born 12 December 1942) is a German conservative politician. She was member of the German Parliament from 1983 until 2002, and was Federal Minister for Family and Senior Citizens. in the cabinet of Helmut Kohl from 1991 until 1994.

== Biography ==
After graduating from high school, Rönsch attended a commercial school until 1960 and then worked at the Federal Criminal Police Office until 1962. From 1962 to 1983 she was employed as a tenant advisor at the non-profit housing association Nassauische Heimstätte. She has been a member of the CDU since 1963 and since 1988 she has been a member of the presidium of the CDU in Hesse.

From 1974 to 1980 she was a city councilor for the city of Wiesbaden. From 1980 to 1983 she was also an honorary city councilor. From 1983 to 2002 she was a member of the German Bundestag. From November 1994 to February 2002 she was deputy chairwoman of the CDU/CSU parliamentary group. From 1983 to 1998, Rönsch was the directly elected representative in the constituency of Wiesbaden. Most recently (14th electoral term 1998) she entered the German Bundestag via the state list of Hesse.

After the 1990 German federal election, she was appointed as Federal Minister for Family and Senior Citizens in the federal government led by Chancellor Helmut Kohl. After the federal elections in 1994, she left the cabinet on 17 November 1994, since the ministry she led was merged into the new Federal Ministry for Family Affairs, Senior Citizens, Women and Youth.

== Quotes ==
- It is important to support parents who wish to have children. After all, the Defence Ministry needs enough young soldiers to be able to maintain a fighting army. (Quoted in Kieler Nachrichten, 10 February 1993)

Political offices
Preceded by Ursula Lehr	Federal Minister for Family Affairs and Senior Citizens; 1991 – 1994	Succeeded by Claudia Nolte
