= Lutz Stroppe =

German politician

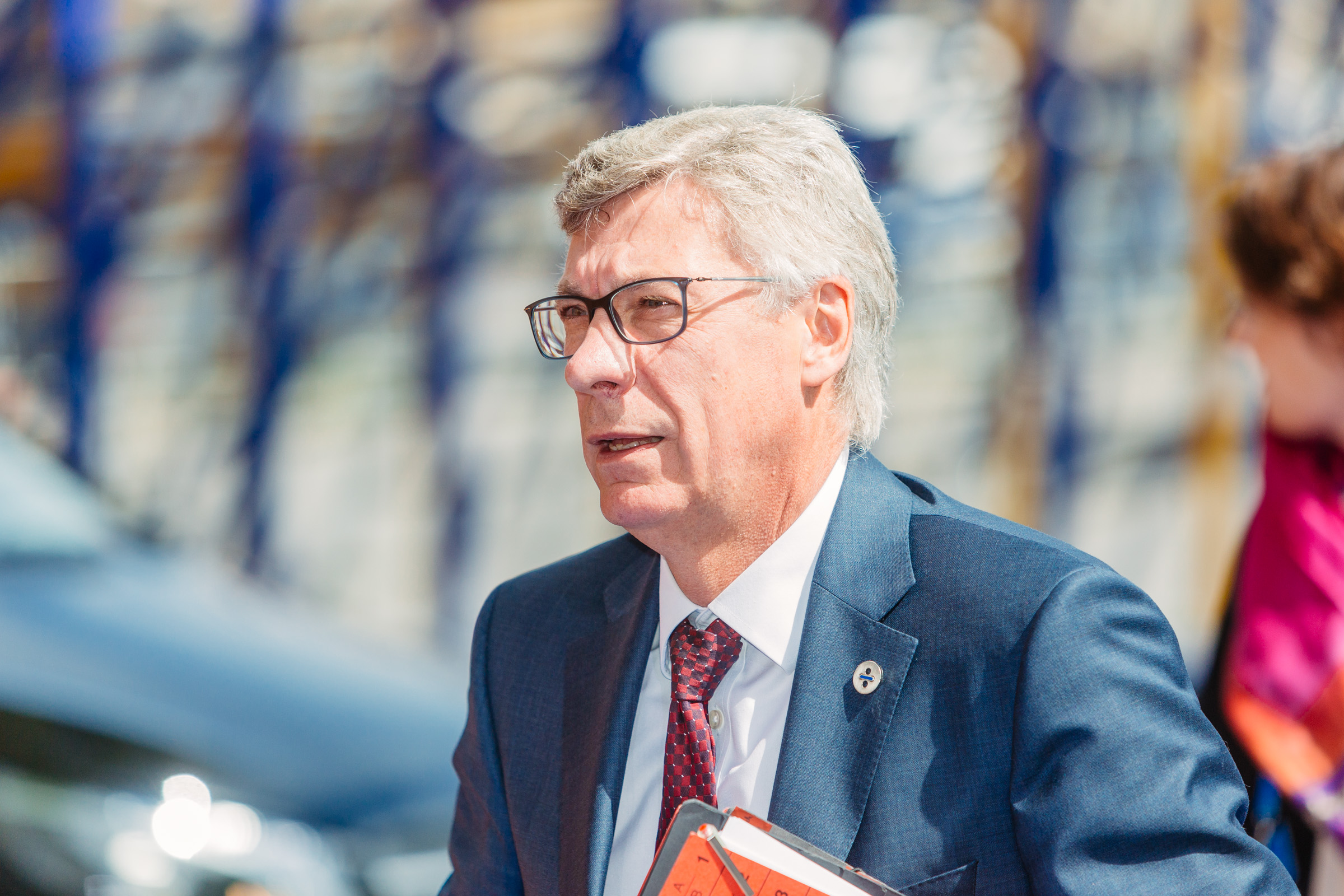
Lutz Stroppe (2017)

Lutz Stroppe (born 20 October 1956) is a German civil servant and politician, and currently the Permanent Secretary of State, i.e. the chief civil servant, in the Federal Ministry of Health, serving since January 2014.

A member of the Christian Democratic Union of Germany, he started his political career as an employee of the Konrad Adenauer Foundation in 1985 and joined the office of Helmut Kohl in 1999, heading the office from 2001. In 2010 he joined the Federal Ministry of Family Affairs, Senior Citizens, Women and Youth, and in 2014 he became the chief civil servant in the Federal Ministry of Health.
