= Schwarzhaupt =

Schwarzhaupt is a surname. Notable people with the surname include:

- Benedikt Schwarzhaupt (born 2001), German field hockey player
- Elisabeth Schwarzhaupt (1901–1986), German politician of the Christian Democratic Union (CDU)
