= Frieser =

Frieser is a surname. Notable people with the surname include:

- Dominik Frieser (born 1993), Austrian footballer
- Karl-Heinz Frieser (born 1949), German military historian and retired colonel of the German Army
- Michael Frieser (born 1964), German politician
