= Renate Blank =

German politician (1941–2021)

Member of the Bundestag; from Bavaria
- In office 20 December 1990 – 27 October 2009
- Preceded by: Peter Wilhelm Höffkes
- Succeeded by: Michael Frieser
- Constituency: Nuremberg South (1990–1998); State list (1998–2002); Nuremberg South (2002–2009)

Personal details
- Born: Renate Anna Reichenberger; 8 August 1941 Nuremberg, Germany
- Died: 16 June 2021 (aged 79)
- Party: Christian Social Union
- Children: 2

Renate Anna Blank (née Reichenberger; 8 August 1941 – 16 June 2021) was a German politician and member of the Christian Social Union in Bavaria. She was born in Nuremberg and was a member of the Bundestag from 1990 to 2009.
