= Horst Schmidbauer =

German politician (1940–2024)

Member of the Bundestag; from Bavaria
- In office 20 December 1990 – 18 October 2005
- Constituency: State list (1990–1998); Nuremberg South (1998–2002); State list (2002–2005)

Personal details
- Born: 3 March 1940 Nuremberg, Germany
- Died: 25 February 2024 (aged 83)
- Party: Social Democratic

Horst Schmidbauer (3 March 1940 – 25 February 2024) was a German politician who served as a member of the Bundestag.
