= Nuremberg South =

Federal electoral district of Germany

244 Nuremberg South
- Electoral district for the Bundestag
- Nuremberg South in 2025
- State: Bavaria
- Population: 269,000 (2019)
- Electorate: 177,316 (2021)
- Major settlements: Nuremberg (partial); Schwabach
- Area: 141.5 km^{2}

Current electoral district
- Created: 1949
- Party: CSU
- Member: Michael Frieser
- Elected: 2009, 2013, 2017, 2021, 2025

Nuremberg South (German: Nürnberg-Süd) is an electoral constituency (German: Wahlkreis) represented in the Bundestag. It elects one member via first-past-the-post voting. Under the current constituency numbering system, it is designated as constituency 244. It is located in northern Bavaria, comprising the southern part of the city of Nuremberg and the city of Schwabach.

Nuremberg South was created for the inaugural 1949 federal election. Since 2009, it has been represented by Michael Frieser of the Christian Social Union (CSU).

== Geography ==
Nuremberg South is located in northern Bavaria. As of the 2021 federal election, it comprises the independent city of Schwabach as well as the Stadtbezirke 14 through 21, 31 through 55, 60 through 63, 96, and 97 from the independent city of Nuremberg.

== History ==
Nuremberg South was created in 1949, then known as Nürnberg. It acquired its current name in the 1965 election. In the 1949 election, it was Bavaria constituency 32 in the numbering system. In the 1953 through 1961 elections, it was number 227. In the 1965 through 1998 elections, it was number 231. In the 2002 and 2005 elections, it was number 246. In the 2009 through 2021 elections, it was number 245. From the 2025 election, it has been number 244.

Originally, the constituency comprised the independent city of Nuremberg excluding northwestern parts. In the 1965 through 1987 elections, it comprised the southern half of the city of Nuremberg. In the 1990 through 1998 elections, it also contained the independent city of Schwabach. It acquired its current borders in the 2002 election.

Election	No.	Name	Borders
1949	32	Nürnberg	Nuremberg city (excluding northwestern parts)
1953	227	Nürnberg	Nuremberg city (excluding northwestern parts)
1957	227	Nürnberg	Nuremberg city (excluding northwestern parts)
1961	227	Nürnberg	Nuremberg city (excluding northwestern parts)
1965	231	Nürnberg-Süd	Nuremberg city (only southern half)
1969	231	Nürnberg-Süd	Nuremberg city (only southern half)
1972	231	Nürnberg-Süd	Nuremberg city (only southern half)
1976	231	Nürnberg-Süd	Nuremberg city (only southern half)
1980	231	Nürnberg-Süd	Nuremberg city (only southern half)
1983	231	Nürnberg-Süd	Nuremberg city (only southern half)
1987	231	Nürnberg-Süd	Nuremberg city (only southern half)
1990	231	Nürnberg-Süd	Nuremberg city (only southern half); Schwabach city
1994	231	Nürnberg-Süd	Nuremberg city (only southern half); Schwabach city
1998	231	Nürnberg-Süd	Nuremberg city (only southern half); Schwabach city
2002	246	Nürnberg-Süd	Nuremberg city (only Stadtbezirke 14 through 21, 31 through 55, 60 through 63, 96, and 97); Schwabach city
2005	246	Nürnberg-Süd	Nuremberg city (only Stadtbezirke 14 through 21, 31 through 55, 60 through 63, 96, and 97); Schwabach city
2009	245	Nürnberg-Süd	Nuremberg city (only Stadtbezirke 14 through 21, 31 through 55, 60 through 63, 96, and 97); Schwabach city
2013	245	Nürnberg-Süd	Nuremberg city (only Stadtbezirke 14 through 21, 31 through 55, 60 through 63, 96, and 97); Schwabach city
2017	245	Nürnberg-Süd	Nuremberg city (only Stadtbezirke 14 through 21, 31 through 55, 60 through 63, 96, and 97); Schwabach city
2021	245	Nürnberg-Süd	Nuremberg city (only Stadtbezirke 14 through 21, 31 through 55, 60 through 63, 96, and 97); Schwabach city
2025	244	Nürnberg-Süd	Nuremberg city (only Stadtbezirke 14 through 21, 31 through 55, 60 through 63, 96, and 97); Schwabach city

== Members ==
The constituency was first represented by Walter Sassnick of the Social Democratic Party (SPD) from 1949 to 1957. Georg Stiller of the Christian Social Union (CSU) won it in 1957 and served one term. Käte Strobel of the SPD was elected in 1961 and served until 1972. He was succeeded by fellow SPD member Egon Lutz from 1972 to 1983. Peter Wilhelm Höffkes of the CSU won the constituency in 1983 and was representative until 1990, followed by Renate Blank from 1990 to 1998. Horst Schmidbauer of the SPD was elected in 1998 and held0 the constituency until 2002, when former member Blank regained it for the CSU. She served a further two terms. Michael Frieser was elected in 2009, and re-elected in 2013, 2017, and 2021.

Election	Member	Party	%
1949	Walter Sassnick	SPD	39.6
1953	Walter Sassnick	SPD	41.2
1957	Georg Stiller	CSU	43.7
1961	Käte Strobel	SPD	41.1
1965	Käte Strobel	SPD	42.4
1969	Käte Strobel	SPD	47.1
1972	Egon Lutz	SPD	58.0
1976	Egon Lutz	SPD	51.9
1980	Egon Lutz	SPD	50.3
1983	Peter Wilhelm Höffkes	CSU	47.1
1987	Peter Wilhelm Höffkes	CSU	45.2
1990	Renate Blank	CSU	43.4
1994	Renate Blank	CSU	45.5
1998	Horst Schmidbauer	SPD	48.0
2002	Renate Blank	CSU	47.5
2005	Renate Blank	CSU	44.0
2009	Michael Frieser	CSU	38.6
2013	Michael Frieser	CSU	44.4
2017	Michael Frieser	CSU	35.6
2021	Michael Frieser	CSU	34.4
2025	Michael Frieser	CSU	36.0

== Election results ==
=== 2025 election ===
Federal election (2025): Nuremberg South
Notes:	Blue background denotes the winner of the electorate vote. Pink background denotes a candidate elected from their party list. Yellow background denotes an electorate win by a list member, or other incumbent. A ✓ or ✗ denotes status of any incumbent, win or lose respectively.						
Party	Candidate	Votes	%	±%	Party votes	%	±%
CSU	✓ Michael Frieser	48,915	36.0	▲5.6	43,914	32.3	▲2.2
AfD	Klaus Fiegl	27,132	20.0	▲9.8	26,901	19.8	▲9.9
Greens	Sascha Müller	14,729	10.8	▼1.3	15,262	11.2	▼2.5
SPD	Thomas Grämmer	24,212	17.8	▼6.4	20,814	15.3	▼7.4
FDP	Lisa-Marie Pischel	3,557	2.66	▼4.2	4,872	3.6	▼5.4
FW	Thomas Estrada	3,668	2.7	▼9.3	2,386	1.8	▼1.7
Left	Kathrin Gomez	10,811	8.0	▲3.9	11,682	8.6	▲4.8
dieBasis				▼9.3	422	0.3	▼1.5
Tierschutzpartei					1,507	1.1	▼0.3
Team Todenhöfer							▼0.48
PARTEI					582	0.4	▼0.4
Pirates							▼0.6
ÖDP	Hermann Schindler	968	0.7	▼0.5	430	0.3	▼0.2
Volt	Sven Dziajlo	1,870	1.4	▲1.0	906	0.7	▲0.4
Unabhängige							▼0.6
Gesundheitsforschung							▼0.1
BP					87	0.1	▼0.1
BSW					6,049	4.4	
Humanists					105	0.1	▼0.0
BD					166	0.1	
Bündnis C							▼0.1
MLPD					68	0.0	0.0
Informal votes		1,005			714		
Total valid votes		135,862			136,153		
Turnout		136867,	78.3	▲5.3			
CSU hold	Majority			▲5.6			

=== 2021 election ===
Federal election (2021): Nuremberg South
Notes:	Blue background denotes the winner of the electorate vote. Pink background denotes a candidate elected from their party list. Yellow background denotes an electorate win by a list member, or other incumbent. A ✓ or ✗ denotes status of any incumbent, win or lose respectively.						
Party	Candidate	Votes	%	±%	Party votes	%	±%
CSU	✓ Michael Frieser	44,192	34.4	▼1.2	38,663	30.0	▼1.2
SPD	Thomas Grämmer	31,098	24.2	▼2.3	29,195	22.7	▲1.7
Greens	Sascha Müller	15,556	12.1	▲4.3	17,687	13.7	▲4.5
AfD	Matthias Vogler	13,123	10.2	▼3.0	12,901	10.0	▼4.2
FDP	Marco Preißinger	8,777	6.8	▲1.0	11,495	8.9	▲0.4
FW	Sonja Mack	5,897	4.6	▲1.8	4,433	3.4	▲1.8
Left	Kathrin Gomez	5,184	4.0	▼4.2	4,893	3.8	▼5.1
dieBasis	Karoline Polster-Strobl	2,491	1.9		2,279	1.8	
Tierschutzpartei					1,846	1.4	▲0.2
Team Todenhöfer					1,066	0.8	
PARTEI					1,018	0.8	▼0.2
Pirates					741	0.6	▲0.1
ÖDP	Claudia Zankl	1,562	1.2		710	0.6	▼0.1
Volt	Deniz Çelik	533	0.4		353	0.3	
Unabhängige					234	0.2	
Gesundheitsforschung					189	0.1	▼0.1
BP					185	0.1	▼0.1
NPD					153	0.1	▼0.3
Humanists					139	0.1	
V-Partei3					137	0.1	▼0.1
Bündnis C					127	0.1	
du.					80	0.1	
The III. Path					77	0.1	
DKP					48	0.0	0.0
MLPD					35	0.0	0.0
LKR					29	0.0	
Informal votes		1,137			847		
Total valid votes		128,423			128,713		
Turnout		129,560	73.1	▲0.4			
CSU hold	Majority	13,094	10.2	▲1.1			

=== 2017 election ===
Federal election (2017): Nuremberg South
Notes:	Blue background denotes the winner of the electorate vote. Pink background denotes a candidate elected from their party list. Yellow background denotes an electorate win by a list member, or other incumbent. A ✓ or ✗ denotes status of any incumbent, win or lose respectively.						
Party	Candidate	Votes	%	±%	Party votes	%	±%
CSU	✓ Michael Frieser	46,511	35.6	▼8.8	40,882	31.2	▼9.3
SPD	Martin Burkert	34,621	26.5	▼5.8	27,467	21.0	▼7.5
AfD	Dirk Klaus Driesang	17,270	13.2	▲9.5	18,679	14.3	▲9.5
Left	Stefan Gerbig	10,772	8.2	▲3.2	11,640	8.9	▲3.1
Greens	Sascha Müller	10,163	7.8	▲1.0	12,166	9.3	▲1.2
FDP	Jasmin Margot Laub	7,632	5.8	▲4.0	11,199	8.6	▲4.3
FW	Anjana Degert	3,706	2.8	▲0.9	2,192	1.7	▼0.1
Tierschutzpartei					1,629	1.2	▲0.5
PARTEI					1,253	1.0	
ÖDP					888	0.7	0.0
Pirates					664	0.5	▼1.9
NPD					513	0.4	▼0.9
BP					353	0.3	0.0
DM					282	0.2	
DiB					263	0.2	
BGE					259	0.2	
Gesundheitsforschung					259	0.2	
V-Partei³					252	0.2	
MLPD					66	0.1	0.0
DKP					55	0.0	
BüSo					17	0.0	0.0
Informal votes		1,410			1,107		
Total valid votes		130,675			130,978		
Turnout		132,085	72.7	▲7.1			
CSU hold	Majority	11,890	9.1	▼3.0			

=== 2013 election ===
Federal election (2013): Nuremberg South
Notes:	Blue background denotes the winner of the electorate vote. Pink background denotes a candidate elected from their party list. Yellow background denotes an electorate win by a list member, or other incumbent. A ✓ or ✗ denotes status of any incumbent, win or lose respectively.						
Party	Candidate	Votes	%	±%	Party votes	%	±%
CSU	✓ Michael Frieser	53,519	44.4	▲5.8	48,881	40.5	▲6.0
SPD	Martin Burkert	38,942	32.3	▲2.1	34,363	28.5	▲3.6
Greens	Birgit Raab	8,165	6.8	▼1.4	9,705	8.0	▼1.8
Left	Oswald Emil Greim	6,038	5.0	▼3.8	6,948	5.8	▼3.7
AfD	Jens Folker Pfeiffer	4,498	3.7		5,737	4.8	
Pirates	Patrick Linnert	3,056	2.5	▲0.4	2,936	2.4	▼0.2
FW	Norbert Frenzel	2,378	2.0		2,187	1.8	
FDP	Dieter Katterle	2,192	1.8	▼6.7	5,087	4.2	▼7.6
NPD	Gerhard Schelle	1,701	1.4	▼1.1	1,572	1.3	▼0.8
Tierschutzpartei					890	0.7	0.0
ÖDP					761	0.6	0.0
REP					481	0.4	▼0.2
BP					318	0.3	0.0
DIE FRAUEN					214	0.2	
Party of Reason					131	0.1	
DIE VIOLETTEN					114	0.1	▼0.1
RRP	Paul Blackman	168	0.1	▼0.9	110	0.1	▼1.1
PRO					79	0.1	
MLPD					50	0.0	0.0
BüSo					11	0.0	0.0
Informal votes		1,157			1,239		
Total valid votes		120,657			120,575		
Turnout		121,814	65.6	▼2.0			
CSU hold	Majority	14,577	12.1	▲3.7			

=== 2009 election ===
Federal election (2009): Nuremberg South
Notes:	Blue background denotes the winner of the electorate vote. Pink background denotes a candidate elected from their party list. Yellow background denotes an electorate win by a list member, or other incumbent. A ✓ or ✗ denotes status of any incumbent, win or lose respectively.						
Party	Candidate	Votes	%	±%	Party votes	%	±%
CSU	Michael Frieser	47,519	38.6	▼5.4	42,645	34.6	▼5.5
SPD	Martin Burkert	37,159	30.2	▼8.6	30,766	24.9	▼10.4
Left	Gudrun Schell	10,794	8.8	▲4.8	11,698	9.5	▲4.6
FDP	Peter Weinlich	10,498	8.5	▲4.5	14,592	11.8	▲4.2
Greens	Birgit Raab	10,048	8.2	▲2.7	12,210	9.9	▲2.4
NPD	Rainer Biller	3,136	2.5	▲0.4	2,548	2.1	▲0.3
Pirates	Milan Berger	2,653	2.2		3,220	2.6	
RRP	Wolf Ranfft	1,290	1.0		1,500	1.2	
Tierschutzpartei					946	0.8	
FAMILIE					776	0.6	▲0.1
ÖDP					753	0.6	
REP					752	0.6	▼0.2
BP					267	0.2	▼0.2
DIE VIOLETTEN					262	0.2	
PBC					209	0.2	▼0.3
CM					85	0.1	
DVU					80	0.1	
MLPD					62	0.1	0.0
BüSo					44	0.0	0.0
Informal votes		1,689			1,371		
Total valid votes		123,097			123,415		
Turnout		124,786	67.6	▼7.4			
CSU hold	Majority	10,360	8.4	▲3.2			

=== 2005 election ===
Federal election (2005):Nuremberg South
Notes:	Blue background denotes the winner of the electorate vote. Pink background denotes a candidate elected from their party list. Yellow background denotes an electorate win by a list member, or other incumbent. A ✓ or ✗ denotes status of any incumbent, win or lose respectively.						
Party	Candidate	Votes	%	±%	Party votes	%	±%
CSU	✓ Renate Blank	59,510	44.0	▼3.5	54,367	40.1	▼7.8
SPD	Martin Burkert	52,523	38.8	▼3.3	47,925	35.3	▼2.3
Greens	Klaus Stöckert	7,411	5.5	▲0.9	10,144	7.5	▲0.6
FDP	Siegfried Seiler	5,433	4.0	▲0.4	10,285	7.6	▲3.5
Left	Kristina Hadeler	5,320	3.9	▲2.9	6,595	4.9	▲3.9
NPD	Ralf Ollert	2,968	2.2		2,358	1.7	▲1.3
BP	Manfred Klemz	1,303	1.0		594	0.4	▲0.4
REP					1,031	0.8	▲0.1
PBC					569	0.4	▲0.2
Familie					672	0.5	
GRAUEN					595	0.4	▲0.3
Feminist					303	0.2	▲0.1
MLPD					125	0.1	
BüSo					74	0.1	0.0
Informal votes		2,346			1,997		
Total valid votes		135,288			135,637		
Turnout		137,634	75.0	▼3.2			
CSU hold	Majority	6,987	5.2				
