= Käte Strobel =

German politician (1907–1996)

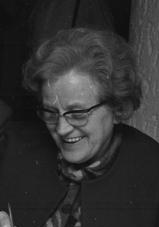
- Strobel in 1968

Minister for Youth, Family and Health
- In office 22 October 1969 – 15 December 1972
- Chancellor: Willy Brandt
- Preceded by: Herself (as Minister for Health Affairs); Aenne Brauksiepe (as Minister for Family and Youth)
- Succeeded by: Katharina Focke

Minister for Health Affairs
- In office 1 December 1966 – 22 October 1969
- Chancellor: Kurt Georg Kiesinger
- Preceded by: Elisabeth Schwarzhaupt
- Succeeded by: Herself (as Minister for Youth, Family and Health)

Member of the Bundestag; from Bavaria
- In office 7 September 1949 – 13 December 1972
- Preceded by: Constituency established
- Succeeded by: Egon Lutz
- Constituency: State list (1949–1961); Nuremberg (1961–1965); Nuremberg South (1965–1972)

Personal details
- Born: 23 July 1907 Nuremberg, Germany
- Died: 26 March 1996 (aged 88) Nuremberg, Germany
- Party: Social Democratic
- Spouse: Hans Strobel (m. 1928; died 1978)
- Children: 2

Käte Strobel (23 July 1907 – 26 March 1996) was a German politician of the Social Democratic Party (SPD).

== Biography ==
Born in Nuremberg, from 1923 to 1938 Käte Müller worked in the office of agricultural organisations in Bavaria. In 1928, she married Hans Strobel, who in 1934 was arrested for planning high treason against the Nazis. He was released from Dachau concentration camp in 1937.

Käte Strobel joined the SPD in 1925, being part of the party's leadership from 1958 to 1971 while from 1949 to 1972 being a member of the German Bundestag. She also served 27 February 1958 to 26 January 1967 in the European Parliament, where she became the leader of the Socialist Group from 1964 to 1967 (to this day, the only female leader other than Pauline Green) and from 1972 to 1978 in the city council of Nuremberg.

In West Germany's government, under Kurt Georg Kiesinger she led the Department of Health (from 1966 to 1969 Federal Ministry of Health) which from 1969 to 1972, with Willy Brandt as chancellor, was expanded to Federal Ministry of Family Affairs, Senior Citizens, Women and Youth.

She promoted sex education by having her department publish a Sexualkundeatlas book and the movie Helga, which depicted all stages of pregnancy. This was considered breaking a taboo.

Her home town Nuremberg made her an honorary citizen in 1980, and named a street near the central station after her. She died in Nuremberg at age 88.

== Quote ==
"Politik ist eine viel zu ernste Sache, als dass man sie allein den Männern überlassen könnte."- (Politics is far too serious a matter to be left solely to men.)
