= Christine Bergmann =

German politician (born 1939)

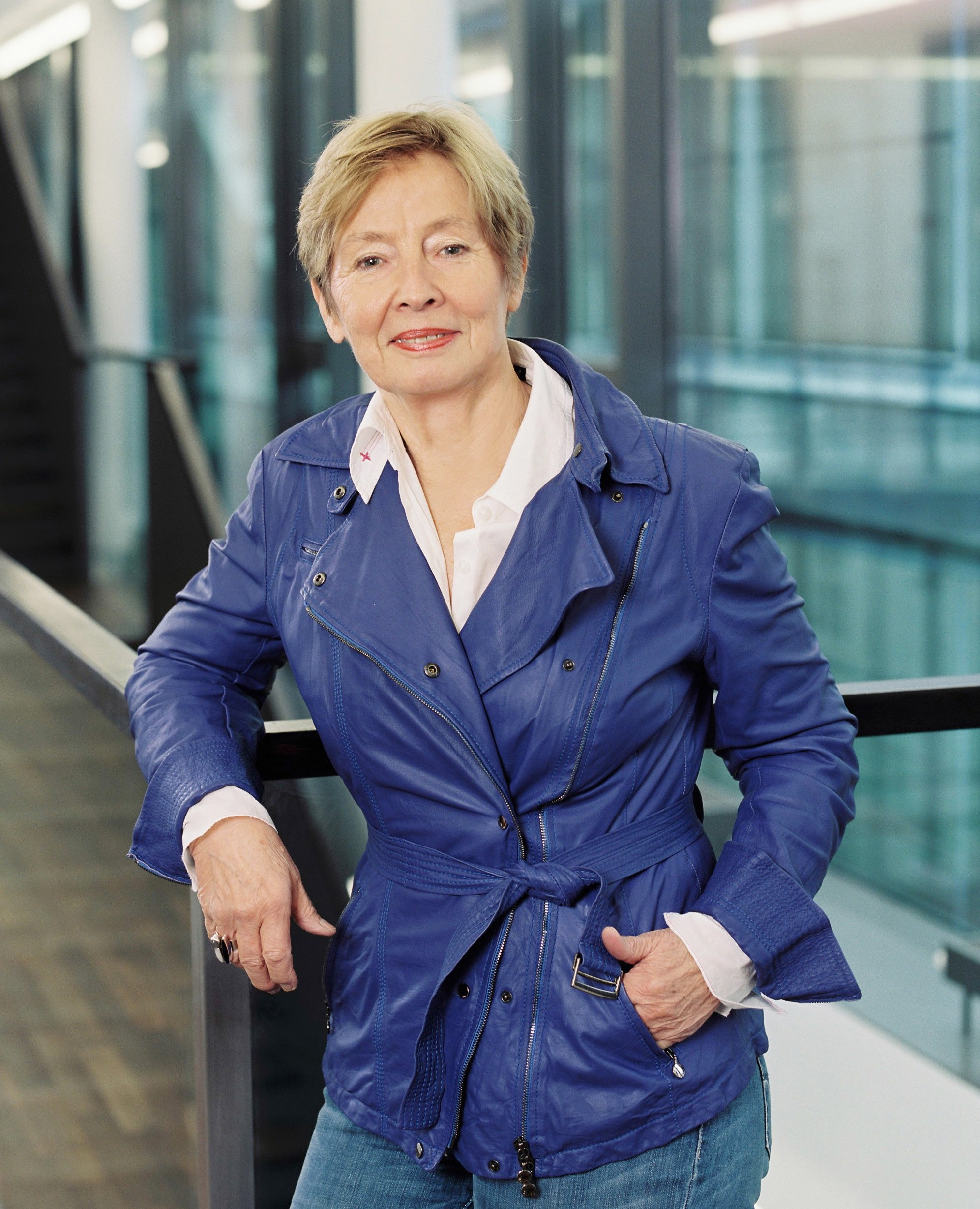
- Bergmann in 2010

Federal Minister for Family Affairs, Senior Citizens, Women and Youth
- In office 27 October 1998 – 22 October 2002
- Chancellor: Gerhard Schröder
- Preceded by: Claudia Nolte
- Succeeded by: Renate Schmidt

Mayor of Berlin (deputy to Governing Mayor)
- In office December 1990 – 26 October 1998
- Preceded by: Ingrid Stahmer
- Succeeded by: Annette Fugmann-Hessing

Berlin senator (Portfolio: Work, Professional Training and Women)
- In office December 1990 – 26 October 1998
- Preceded by: Anne Klein
- Succeeded by: Gabriele Schöttler

Personal details
- Born: 7 September 1939 (age 86) Dresden, Germany
- Party: SDP (1989-1990); SPD (since 1990)
- Children: 2
- Education: "Karl Marx" University, Leipzig

Christine Bergmann (born 7 September 1939) is a German politician (SPD).

She grew up in East Germany, embarking on a public political career only at the time of German reunification. During the final months of the German Democratic Republic she served as president of the East Berlin City Council. Moving from city politics to national politics, between 1998 and 2002 she served under Chancellor Gerhard Schröder as Minister for Family, Senior Citizens, Women, and Youth. More recently, in 2016 she was appointed a member of the Independent Commission for Dealing with Sexual Abuse of Children ("Unabhängige Kommission zur Aufarbeitung sexuellen Kindesmissbrauchs"), having served as the full-time commissioner during 2010/2011.

== Early life and education ==
Christine Bergmann, a twin, was born in Dresden. The three siblings with whom she grew up were all brothers. She passed her school final exams ("Abitur") in 1957 and enrolled at Leipzig University (then known as "Karl Marx University") in Leipzig to study Pharmacy. She passed the relevant exams in 1963 after which, till 1967, she worked as a pharmacist in East Berlin.

== Career ==
Between 1967 and 1977, Bergmann worked on a freelance basis, employed on the administrative side for the National Journal for Pharmacy, Pharmacotherapy and Laboratory Diagnostics ("Zentralblatt für Pharmazie, Pharmakotherapie u. Laboratoriumsdiagnostik"). Between 1977 and 1989 she was in charge of the journal's secretarial department. Between 1977 and 1990, she headed up the drugs information department while employed as a research assistant at the National Institute for Drug Administration ("Institut für Arzneimittelwesen der DDR").

In 1977, Bergmann became a member of the Society for German–Soviet Friendship and of the (East) German Trade Union Federation, remaining a member till 1989. During this time she also worked on her doctorate which she received from the Humboldt University in July 1989 for a study on qualitative and methodical aspects of the effectiveness of drug information provision in East Germany.

=== Political career ===
In December 1989, following a series of developments which had opened the way for German reunification, Bergmann joined the newly reconstituted Social Democratic Party (SDP) (in East Germany), which would merge with its West German counterpart (the SPD) in September 1990. In 1990, she was elected deputy regional chair of the party, a position she retained till 1994. Between 1991 and 1998, her political career in Berlin was focused on regional politics.

From May 1990 till January 1991, Bergmann was president of the Berlin city council. Between December 1990 and October 1998, she served as junior mayor of Berlin. During this period, voters hadn't given any one party an overall majority in the Berlin senate, the city was governed by a grand coalition between the centre-right CDU (party) and the moderate-left SPD. During her seven years as mayor, Bergmann accordingly served as deputy to the city's "governing mayor", Eberhard Diepgen of the CDU. Within the Berlin Senate she held the portfolio for Work, Professional Training and Women.

Ahead of the 1994 elections, SPD chairman Rudolf Scharping included Bergmann in his shadow cabinet for the party’s campaign to unseat incumbent Helmut Kohl as Chancellor. During the campaign, she served as shadow minister of education and research.

In 1998 Bergmann switched to national politics, accepting an appointment in the Schröder government as Minister for Family Affairs, Senior Citizens, Women and Youth, in succession to Claudia Nolte. She had already shadowed the portfolio in opposition under the SPD party leadership of Rudolf Scharping. In 1998, less than a decade after reunification and in comparison to its CDU predecessor, Gerhard Schröder's government was short of leading members from the "New Federal states": Christine Bermann was the only member of the First Schröder cabinet who had grown up in the old German Democratic Republic (East Germany). She oversaw a number of improvements in the tax treatment of families and significant recalibration of Child Allowance ("Kindergeld"). Bergmann pressed for the legalisation of prostitution and introduced legislation on parental leave. Her reputation was for competence, with a tendency to avoid the limelight. She was once quoted as saying of herself that she was not inclined to self-promotion ("Ich neige nicht sehr zur Selbstdarstellung").

Bergmann retired from the government in 2002, but returned to politics in 2004, working with Kurt Biedenkopf as an ombudswoman, observing the impact of the "Hartz" labour market reforms, with a mandate to advise government and parliament on any recommended revisions to it.

== Additional affiliations and memberships ==
Christine Bergmann is a member of the honorary council of AMCHA foundation, an organisation headquartered in Jerusalem which provides practical Psycho-social support for holocaust survivors and their descendants. In March 2010, she was appointed by the government as the Independent Commissioner for Dealing with Sexual Abuse of Children ("Unabhängiger Beauftragter für Fragen des sexuellen Kindesmissbrauchs"). She was succeeded in the post at the end of 2011 by Johannes-Wilhelm Rörig, who back in the early 1990s had temporarily run her office while she was a Berlin senator.

Since June 2011, Bergmann has been a member of the Berlin Future Foundation ("Stiftung Zukunft Berlin"). Since January 2016, she has been a member of the Independent Commission for Dealing with Sexual Abuse of Children ("Unabhängige Kommission zur Aufarbeitung sexuellen Kindesmissbrauchs").

In 2015, Bergmann was awarded the Mercator Visiting Professorship for Political Management at the Universität Essen-Duisburg's NRW School of Governance.

- Evangelisches Gymnasium zum Grauen Kloster, Member of the Board of Trustees
- Max Planck Institute for Demographic Research, Member of the Board of Trustees

== Awards and honours ==
- 2007: Order of Merit of Berlin
- 2011: Order of Merit of the Federal Republic of Germany 1st class
- 2012: Louise Schroeder medal
