= Stefan Korbach =

Stefan Korbach MdB

Member of the Bundestag; for Wiesbaden
- Incumbent
- Assumed office 25 March 2025
- Preceded by: Astrid Mannes

Personal details
- Born: 16 March 1958 (age 68) Königstein im Taunus, West Germany
- Party: Christian Democratic Union
- Children: 2
- Education: Goethe University Frankfurt
- Website: www.stefan-korbach.de

Stefan Korbach (born 16 March 1958) is a German politician from the Christian Democratic Union of Germany. He was elected to the Bundestag in the 2025 German federal election.

In the 2025 German federal election, he was a direct candidate in the constituency of Wiesbaden. He is an businessman and honorary city councillor in Wiesbaden.
