= Claudia Nolte =

German politician

Claudia Crawford Bundesministerin a. D.
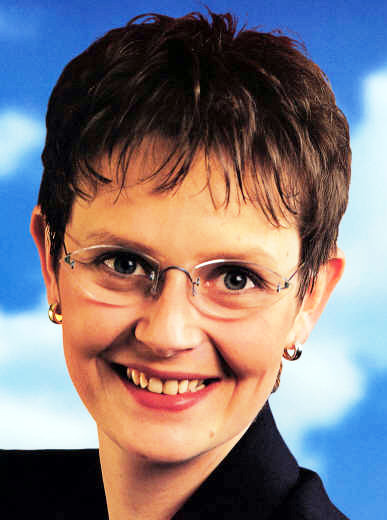
- Nolte in 1998

Federal Minister of Family Affairs, Senior Citizens, Women and Youth
- In office 17 November 1994 – 26 October 1998
- Chancellor: Helmut Kohl
- Preceded by: Hannelore Rönsch (Federal Minister for Family and Senior Citizens); Angela Merkel (Federal Minister for Women and Youth)
- Succeeded by: Christine Bergmann

Member of the Bundestag
- In office 3 October 1990 – 18 October 2005

Personal details
- Born: Claudia Wiesemüller; 7 February 1966 (age 60) Rostock, East Germany
- Party: Christian Democratic Union
- Spouses: Rainer Nolte (m. 1990; div. 2001) David Crawford (m. 2018)
- Children: 1
- Education: Ilmenau University of Technology

Claudia Crawford (né Wiesemüller, formerly and still commonly known as Claudia Nolte; born 7 February 1966) is a German politician of the Christian Democratic Union (CDU), who became the youngest cabinet minister in German history whilst in office from 1994 to 1998 and was Federal Minister for family, seniors, women and youth affairs and, by virtue of this office, presided over the European Union Council of Ministers. Nolte is a Catholic and is active in the Catholic community. She is married to investigative journalist David Crawford of Correctiv. With her marriage in July 2008, she took the name of her husband.

== Childhood ==
Claudia Wiesemüller was born in 1966 in Rostock, a city that was in East Germany. In her teenage years she was refused admission to a college preparatory school due to her participation in Catholic church youth activities. East German school officials required her to learn a trade before she could enroll in college, so whilst attending a technical secondary school in Rostock, she took vocational training in marine electronics from 1982 to 1984.

== Entry into politics ==
In 1985, Nolte studied automation and cybernetic engineering at the Technical University of Ilmenau, where she graduatated with a Diplom degree in 1990. In October 1989 she was active in the opposition movement New Forum within the German Democratic Republic and joined the Christian Democratic Union (CDU) in February 1990. After completing her studies at the Technical University of Ilmenau, she accepted a position as a research assistant there but left this job within weeks owing to her election to the first freely elected East German parliament.

== Political office ==
From March to October 1990, Nolte was a member of the People's Chamber of the German Democratic Republic, or East Germany. After German unification on 3 October 1990 she led the Christian Democratic Party list in Thuringia State in the first all-German elections for the Bundestag in December 1990. She served from 1991 to 1994 as her parliamentary group’s spokeswoman on women's policy. During that time, she soon acquired a reputation for being independent minded, particularly on the issue of abortion. Most notably, Nolte voted against one liberalization bill supported by a majority of her own party. From 1992 to 1994 she was a member of Thuringia CDU.

On 18 November 1994 Nolte became the Federal Minister of Family Affairs, Senior Citizens, Women and Youth. She was 28 years old, making her the youngest German cabinet minister in German history. She was also one of only three women in the Cabinet and one of only two people from eastern Germany in Chancellor Helmut Kohl's 16-member Cabinet; the other was Environment Minister Angela Merkel. On 30 November 1994 she was named the Council of the European Union’s President – again the youngest ever. In 1998 she left the German cabinet when her party joined the opposition. From 1996 to 2000 Nolte was a member of the CDU presiding council in Germany and from January 1999 to October 2002 she was commissioner of the CDU/CSU parliamentary group for disabled people.

From 2002 to 2005, Nolte was vice chairman for United Nations contacts in the German parliament. In 2005 she failed to win a direct seat in the Bundestag representing the Gotha Ilm county electoral district. Under Germany's electoral law she was eligible to return to the German Federal Parliament via the state list in May 2008, but she declined.

== Later career ==
In January 2006, Nolte moved to Belgrade, where she directed the activities of a political foundation, heading the Konrad-Adenauer-Stiftung offices in Serbia, Montenegro and Kosovo. In April 2010 she moved to London, where she headed the activities of the Konrad-Adenauer-Stiftung offices in the United Kingdom and Ireland. In 2013 she moved to Moscow, where she heads the Konrad-Adenauer-Stiftung offices in Russia.

She is a member of the German American Society, Konrad-Adenauer-Stiftung, Christlich-Demokratische Arbeitnehmerschaft (CDA) and of CDU/CSU's association of medium-sized businesses Mittelstands- und Wirtschaftsvereinigung (MIT).

== Publications ==
- Die Bedeutung des Internet für die weltweite Wahrnehmung der Vereinten Nationen, in: Alexander Bilgeri und Alexander Wolf (Hrsg.): „Diplomatie Digital“, Verlag Barbara Budrich, Opladen 2004.
- Putins "Gelenkte Demokratie" - Weg zum authoritären Staat?, in: Erich G. Fritz (Hrsg.): Forum Internationale Politik. Russland nach den Wahlen – Weg ohne Demokratie oder russischer Weg zur Demokratie (erscheint im Herbst 2004)
- Wirtschaftsstärke mit Sozialkompetenz verbinden: globale Veränderungen fordern mündige Bürgerinnen und Bürger, in: Rita Süssmuth (Hg.): Mut zur Macht in Frauenhand - Herford. - (2001), S. 196 - 201.
- Auf jeden Fall freiheitlich demokratisch!, in: Hans-Otto Mühleisen (Hrsg.): Welche Gesellschaft – welches Deutschland?: PolitikerInnen der jungen Generation entwerfen Zukunftsbilder, Frankfurt am Main: Knecht, 1999.
- Familienpolitik als Zukunftsaufgabe, in: Die Zukunft der Familie : Aufgaben und Perspektiven moderner Familienpolitik / [hrsg. von der Konrad-Adenauer-Stiftung, Bereich Forschung und Beratung] - Sankt Augustin. - (1998), S. 9 - 19.
- Frauen sind die Gewinnerinnen der modernen Welt, in: Leitbild auch für morgen: Die soziale Marktwirtschaft: Thesen zur Gestaltung Deutschlands und Europas / Matthias Wissmann (Hrsg.). - München. (1998), S. 87 - 92.
- Läßt sich sexueller Kindesmißbrauch mit politischen Mitteln bekämpfen?, in: Prävention des sexuellen Kindesmißbrauchs: gesellschaftspolitische Implikationen und Reaktionen / Hanns-Seidel-Stiftung e.V. - München, S. 79 - 85.
- Das Internationale Jahr der Senioren der Vereinten Nationen 1999: eine Gesellschaft für alle Lebensalter; der internationale Rahmen und der derzeitige Stand der Umsetzung in Deutschland, in: Nachrichtendienst des Deutschen Vereins für Öffentliche und Private Fürsorge, - 77 (1997),9, S. 265 - 268.
