= Wiesbaden (electoral district) =

Federal electoral district of Germany

178 Wiesbaden
- Electoral district for the Bundestag
- Wiesbaden in 2025
- State: Hesse
- Population: 278,500 (2019)
- Electorate: 186,735 (2021)
- Major settlements: Wiesbaden
- Area: 203.9 km^{2}

Current electoral district
- Created: 1949
- Party: CDU
- Member: Stefan Korbach
- Elected: 2025

Wiesbaden is an electoral constituency (German: Wahlkreis) represented in the Bundestag. It elects one member via first-past-the-post voting. Under the current constituency numbering system, it is designated as constituency 178. It is located in southwestern Hesse, comprising the city of Wiesbaden.

Wiesbaden was created for the inaugural 1949 federal election. From 2017 to 2025, it was represented by Ingmar Jung of the Christian Democratic Union (CDU). Since 2025 it has been represented by Stefan Korbach of the CDU.

== Geography ==
Wiesbaden is located in southwestern Hesse. As of the 2021 federal election, it is coterminous with the independent city of Wiesbaden.

== History ==
Wiesbaden was created in 1949. In the 1949 election, it was Hesse constituency 13 in the numbering system. From 1953 through 1976, it was number 138. From 1980 through 1998, it was number 136. In the 2002 and 2005 elections, it was number 180. In the 2009 through 2021 elections, it was number 179. From the 2025 election, it has been number 178. Its borders have not changed since its creation.

== Members ==
The constituency was first represented by Victor-Emanuel Preusker of the Free Democratic Party (FDP) from 1949 to 1957. Elisabeth Schwarzhaupt of the Christian Democratic Union (CDU) was elected in 1957. Karl Wittrock of the Social Democratic Party (SPD) won it in 1961, and was succeeded in 1965 by fellow party member Karl-Walter Fritz. Horst Krockert of the SPD then served from 1969 to 1980. Rudi Schmitt of the SPD was representative for a single term from 1980 to 1983 before Hannelore Rönsch won the constituency for the CDU. Heidemarie Wieczorek-Zeul regained it for the SPD in 1998 and served until 2009. Kristina Schröder of the CDU was then representative from 2009 to 2017. Ingmar Jung of the CDU was elected in 2017.

| Election | Member | Party | % |
|---|---|---|---|
| 1949 | Victor-Emanuel Preusker | FDP | 36.4 |
| 1953 | Victor-Emanuel Preusker | FDP | 32.4 |
| 1957 | Elisabeth Schwarzhaupt | CDU | 43.5 |
| 1961 | Karl Wittrock | SPD | 39.1 |
| 1965 | Karl-Walter Fritz | SPD | 45.3 |
| 1969 | Horst Krockert | SPD | 50.5 |
| 1972 | Horst Krockert | SPD | 52.4 |
| 1976 | Horst Krockert | SPD | 46.0 |
| 1980 | Rudi Schmitt | SPD | 48.5 |
| 1983 | Hannelore Rönsch | CDU | 46.6 |
| 1987 | Hannelore Rönsch | CDU | 46.1 |
| 1990 | Hannelore Rönsch | CDU | 43.2 |
| 1994 | Hannelore Rönsch | CDU | 45.0 |
| 1998 | Heidemarie Wieczorek-Zeul | SPD | 44.2 |
| 2002 | Heidemarie Wieczorek-Zeul | SPD | 47.3 |
| 2005 | Heidemarie Wieczorek-Zeul | SPD | 44.1 |
| 2009 | Kristina Schröder | CDU | 40.8 |
| 2013 | Kristina Schröder | CDU | 43.6 |
| 2017 | Ingmar Jung | CDU | 34.3 |
| 2021 | Ingmar Jung | CDU | 26.3 |
| 2025 | Stefan Korbach | CDU | 30.7 |

== Election results ==
=== 2025 election ===
Federal election (2025): Wiesbaden
| Notes: | Blue background denotes the winner of the electorate vote. Pink background denotes a candidate elected from their party list. Yellow background denotes an electorate win by a list member, or other incumbent. A ✓ or ✗ denotes status of any incumbent, win or lose respectively. | | | | | | |
| Party | Candidate | Votes | % | ±% | Party votes | % | ±% |
|---|---|---|---|---|---|---|---|
| CDU | Stefan Korbach | 44,994 | 30.7 | ▲4.4 | 39,189 | 26.6 | ▲5.5 |
| SPD | Nadine Ruf | 32,698 | 22.3 | ▼3.5 | 25,711 | 17.5 | ▼7.4 |
| Greens | Panagio Garcia | 21,876 | 14.9 | ▼4.3 | 23,494 | 16.0 | ▼3.9 |
| AfD | Erich Heidkamp | 20,405 | 13.9 | ▲7.1 | 20,737 | 14.1 | ▲7.0 |
| Left | Daniel Winter | 15,412 | 10.5 | ▲5.6 | 16,942 | 11.5 | ▲6.5 |
| FDP | Lucas Schwalbach | 5,944 | 4.1 | ▼6.3 | 8,234 | 5.6 | ▼8.5 |
| BSW | | | | | 7,249 | 4.9 | New |
| Volt | Daniel Weber | 3,115 | 2.1 | ▲0.7 | 1,772 | 1.2 | ▲0.2 |
| Tierschutzpartei | | | | | 1,506 | 1.0 | ▼0.2 |
| FW | Eike Kreft | 2,316 | 1.6 | ▲0.4 | 1,244 | 0.8 | ▼0.2 |
| PARTEI | | | | | 692 | 0.5 | ▼0.3 |
| BD | | | | | 203 | 0.1 | New |
| Humanists | | | | | 173 | 0.1 | ▼0.1 |
| MLPD | | | | | 61 | <0.1 | 0.0 |
| Informal votes | | 1,431 | | | 984 | | |
| Total valid votes | | 146,760 | | | 147,207 | | |
| Turnout | | 148,191 | 79.7 | ▲6.7 | | | |
| CDU hold | Majority | 12,296 | 8.4 | ▲7.9 | | | |

=== 2021 election ===
Federal election (2021): Wiesbaden
| Notes: | Blue background denotes the winner of the electorate vote. Pink background denotes a candidate elected from their party list. Yellow background denotes an electorate win by a list member, or other incumbent. A ✓ or ✗ denotes status of any incumbent, win or lose respectively. | | | | | | |
| Party | Candidate | Votes | % | ±% | Party votes | % | ±% |
|---|---|---|---|---|---|---|---|
| CDU | ✓ Ingmar Jung | 35,375 | 26.3 | ▼8.0 | 28,523 | 21.1 | ▼7.8 |
| SPD | Nadine Ruf | 34,750 | 25.8 | ▼2.7 | 33,546 | 24.9 | ▲3.7 |
| Greens | Uta Brehm | 25,811 | 19.2 | ▲10.2 | 26,818 | 19.9 | ▲8.1 |
| FDP | Lucas Schwalbach | 13,995 | 10.4 | ▲3.4 | 18,947 | 14.0 | ▲0.7 |
| AfD | Erich Heidkamp | 9,192 | 6.8 | ▼3.6 | 9,588 | 7.1 | ▼4.1 |
| Left | Daniel Winter | 6,652 | 4.9 | ▼2.7 | 7,128 | 5.3 | ▼4.2 |
| dieBasis | Ulrike Fröhlich | 2,327 | 1.7 | | 1,911 | 1.4 | |
| Tierschutzpartei | | | | | 1,651 | 1.2 | ▲0.4 |
| Volt | Samater Liban | 1,904 | 1.4 | | 1,324 | 1.0 | |
| FW | Andre Wittmann | 1,602 | 1.2 | ▲0.1 | 1,411 | 1.0 | ▲0.4 |
| Team Todenhöfer | | | | | 1,367 | 1.0 | |
| PARTEI | Lukas Haker | 1,559 | 1.2 | ▼0.3 | 1,049 | 0.8 | ▼0.2 |
| Pirates | Yasmin Schulze | 742 | 0.6 | ▼0.1 | 525 | 0.4 | 0.0 |
| Humanists | Felicitas Klings | 472 | 0.3 | | 252 | 0.2 | |
| Gesundheitsforschung | | | | | 152 | 0.1 | |
| ÖDP | | | | | 139 | 0.1 | ▼0.1 |
| V-Partei3 | | | | | 135 | 0.1 | ▼0.1 |
| BüSo | Alexander Hartmann | 123 | 0.1 | | | | |
| Bündnis C | | | | | 112 | 0.1 | |
| NPD | | | | | 104 | 0.1 | ▼0.1 |
| LKR | Lucien Peter | 103 | 0.1 | | 81 | 0.1 | |
| DKP | | | | | 35 | 0.0 | 0.0 |
| MLPD | | | | | 34 | 0.0 | 0.0 |
| Bündnis 21 | | | | | 34 | 0.0 | |
| Informal votes | | 1,607 | | | 1,348 | | |
| Total valid votes | | 134,607 | | | 134,866 | | |
| Turnout | | 136,214 | 72.9 | ▼0.9 | | | |
| CDU hold | Majority | 625 | 0.5 | ▼5.3 | | | |

=== 2017 election ===
Federal election (2017): Wiesbaden
| Notes: | Blue background denotes the winner of the electorate vote. Pink background denotes a candidate elected from their party list. Yellow background denotes an electorate win by a list member, or other incumbent. A ✓ or ✗ denotes status of any incumbent, win or lose respectively. | | | | | | |
| Party | Candidate | Votes | % | ±% | Party votes | % | ±% |
|---|---|---|---|---|---|---|---|
| CDU | Ingmar Jung | 47,309 | 34.3 | ▼9.3 | 40,022 | 29.0 | ▼9.7 |
| SPD | Simon Rottloff | 39,396 | 28.6 | ▼6.4 | 29,247 | 21.2 | ▼6.6 |
| AfD | Michael Goebel | 14,417 | 10.4 | ▲6.5 | 15,496 | 11.2 | ▲6.2 |
| Greens | Felix Möller | 12,321 | 8.9 | ▲1.4 | 16,286 | 11.8 | ▲0.1 |
| Left | Adrian Gabriel | 10,558 | 7.7 | ▲2.9 | 13,160 | 9.5 | ▲3.6 |
| FDP | Lucas Schwalbach | 9,693 | 7.0 | ▲4.5 | 18,400 | 13.3 | ▲6.5 |
| PARTEI | Alexander Gürtler | 1,963 | 1.4 | | 1,360 | 1.0 | ▲0.6 |
| Tierschutzpartei | | | | | 1,196 | 0.9 | |
| FW | Hans-Georg Kroll | 1,467 | 1.1 | | 943 | 0.7 | ▲0.2 |
| Pirates | Gunnar Langer | 841 | 0.6 | ▼1.1 | 578 | 0.4 | ▼1.5 |
| BGE | | | | | 341 | 0.2 | |
| ÖDP | | | | | 297 | 0.2 | |
| DM | | | | | 273 | 0.2 | |
| V-Partei³ | | | | | 253 | 0.2 | |
| NPD | | | | | 222 | 0.2 | ▼0.5 |
| MLPD | | | | | 75 | 0.1 | 0.0 |
| BüSo | | | | | 54 | 0.0 | ▼0.1 |
| DKP | | | | | 26 | 0.0 | |
| Informal votes | | 1,810 | | | 1,546 | | |
| Total valid votes | | 137,965 | | | 138,229 | | |
| Turnout | | 139,775 | 73.8 | ▲4.0 | | | |
| CDU hold | Majority | 7,913 | 5.7 | ▼2.9 | | | |

=== 2013 election ===
Federal election (2013): Wiesbaden
| Notes: | Blue background denotes the winner of the electorate vote. Pink background denotes a candidate elected from their party list. Yellow background denotes an electorate win by a list member, or other incumbent. A ✓ or ✗ denotes status of any incumbent, win or lose respectively. | | | | | | |
| Party | Candidate | Votes | % | ±% | Party votes | % | ±% |
|---|---|---|---|---|---|---|---|
| CDU | ✓ Kristina Schröder | 56,466 | 43.6 | ▲2.8 | 50,187 | 38.7 | ▲7.6 |
| SPD | Simon Rottloff | 45,311 | 35.0 | ▲2.3 | 36,041 | 27.8 | ▲4.2 |
| Greens | Andreas Romppel | 9,784 | 7.5 | ▼0.8 | 15,133 | 11.7 | ▼2.5 |
| Left | Manuela Schon | 6,097 | 4.7 | ▼2.2 | 7,668 | 5.9 | ▼2.7 |
| AfD | Frank Mario Zaleski | 5,176 | 4.0 | | 6,550 | 5.1 | |
| FDP | Dagmar Döring | 3,296 | 2.5 | ▼6.9 | 8,801 | 6.8 | ▼10.9 |
| Pirates | Tobias Elsenmüller | 2,224 | 1.7 | | 2,531 | 2.0 | ▼0.2 |
| NPD | Daniel Knebel | 941 | 0.7 | ▼0.4 | 865 | 0.7 | ▼0.1 |
| FW | | | | | 665 | 0.5 | |
| PARTEI | | | | | 525 | 0.4 | |
| REP | | | | | 352 | 0.3 | ▼0.5 |
| BüSo | Alexander Hartmann | 335 | 0.3 | ▼0.2 | 151 | 0.1 | ▼0.1 |
| PRO | | | | | 124 | 0.1 | |
| MLPD | | | | | 52 | 0.0 | 0.0 |
| SGP | | | | | 38 | 0.0 | |
| Informal votes | | 2,705 | | | 2,652 | | |
| Total valid votes | | 129,630 | | | 129,683 | | |
| Turnout | | 132,335 | 69.8 | ▼1.4 | | | |
| CDU hold | Majority | 11,155 | 8.6 | ▲0.4 | | | |

=== 2009 election ===
Federal election (2009): Wiesbaden
| Notes: | Blue background denotes the winner of the electorate vote. Pink background denotes a candidate elected from their party list. Yellow background denotes an electorate win by a list member, or other incumbent. A ✓ or ✗ denotes status of any incumbent, win or lose respectively. | | | | | | |
| Party | Candidate | Votes | % | ±% | Party votes | % | ±% |
|---|---|---|---|---|---|---|---|
| CDU | Kristina Köhler | 53,416 | 40.8 | ▼0.4 | 40,831 | 31.1 | ▼1.0 |
| SPD | ✗ Heidemarie Wieczorek-Zeul | 42,751 | 32.6 | ▼11.4 | 30,892 | 23.5 | ▼9.1 |
| FDP | Wolfgang Gerhardt | 12,350 | 9.4 | ▲5.1 | 23,194 | 17.7 | ▲4.4 |
| Greens | Gabriele Schuchalter-Eicke | 10,970 | 8.4 | ▲3.7 | 18,560 | 14.1 | ▲0.8 |
| Left | Jörg Jungmann | 9,016 | 6.9 | ▲2.9 | 11,333 | 8.6 | ▲3.5 |
| Pirates | | | | | 2,839 | 2.2 | |
| NPD | Stefan Jagsch | 1,516 | 1.2 | ▼0.2 | 1,070 | 0.8 | ▼0.1 |
| REP | | | | | 1,049 | 0.8 | ▼0.2 |
| Tierschutzpartei | | | | | 1,005 | 0.8 | ▲0.1 |
| BüSo | Alexander Hartmann | 588 | 0.4 | 0.0 | 269 | 0.2 | 0.0 |
| Independent | Hartmut Schrader | 444 | 0.3 | | | | |
| DVU | | | | | 125 | 0.1 | |
| MLPD | | | | | 37 | 0.0 | 0.0 |
| Informal votes | | 2,374 | | | 2,221 | | |
| Total valid votes | | 131,051 | | | 131,204 | | |
| Turnout | | 133,425 | 71.2 | ▼4.4 | | | |
| CDU gain from SPD | Majority | 10,665 | 8.2 | | | | |

=== 2005 election ===
Federal election (2005):Wiesbaden
| Notes: | Blue background denotes the winner of the electorate vote. Pink background denotes a candidate elected from their party list. Yellow background denotes an electorate win by a list member, or other incumbent. A ✓ or ✗ denotes status of any incumbent, win or lose respectively. | | | | | | |
| Party | Candidate | Votes | % | ±% | Party votes | % | ±% |
|---|---|---|---|---|---|---|---|
| SPD | ✓ Heidemarie Wieczorek-Zeul | 60,916 | 44.1 | ▼3.2 | 45,173 | 32.6 | ▼4.2 |
| CDU | Kristina Köhler | 56,861 | 41.1 | ▲1.2 | 44,485 | 32.1 | ▼4.0 |
| Greens | Matti Seithe | 6,395 | 4.6 | ▼0.8 | 18,431 | 13.3 | ▼0.6 |
| FDP | Eric Starke | 6,005 | 4.3 | ▼1.2 | 18,441 | 13.3 | ▲4.7 |
| Left | Hartmut Bohrer | 5,473 | 4.0 | ▲2.7 | 7,127 | 5.1 | ▲3.7 |
| NPD | Marko Dazer | 31,919 | 1.4 | | 1,283 | 0.9 | ▲0.7 |
| REP | | | | | 1,439 | 4.0 | ▲0.1 |
| Tierschutzpartei | | | | | 933 | 0.7 | ▲0.2 |
| GRAUEN | | | | | 716 | 0.5 | ▲0.3 |
| BüSo | Alexander Hartmann | 653 | 0.5 | 0.0 | 270 | 0.2 | ▲0.1 |
| SGP | | | | | 87 | 0.1 | |
| MLPD | | | | | 36 | 0.0 | |
| Informal votes | | 2,616 | | | 2,417 | | |
| Total valid votes | | 138,222 | | | 138,421 | | |
| Turnout | | 140,838 | 75.6 | ▼1.4 | | | |
| SPD hold | Majority | 4,055 | 3 | | | | |
