= Federal Ministry of Health and Social Affairs (Germany) =

Former government ministry of Germany

The Federal Ministry of Health and Social Affairs (Bundesministerium für Gesundheit und Soziale Sicherung, ) was a government ministry in the Federal Republic of Germany from 22 October 2002 to 18 October 2005. It was formed with during the first Government of Angela Merkel and dissolved with the Second Gerhard Schröder Cabinet. The function of the ministry was then transferred to the Federal Ministry of Health and the Federal Ministry of Labour and Social Affairs.

Ulla Schmidt was the only head of the ministry.
