= Katharina Focke =

German politician

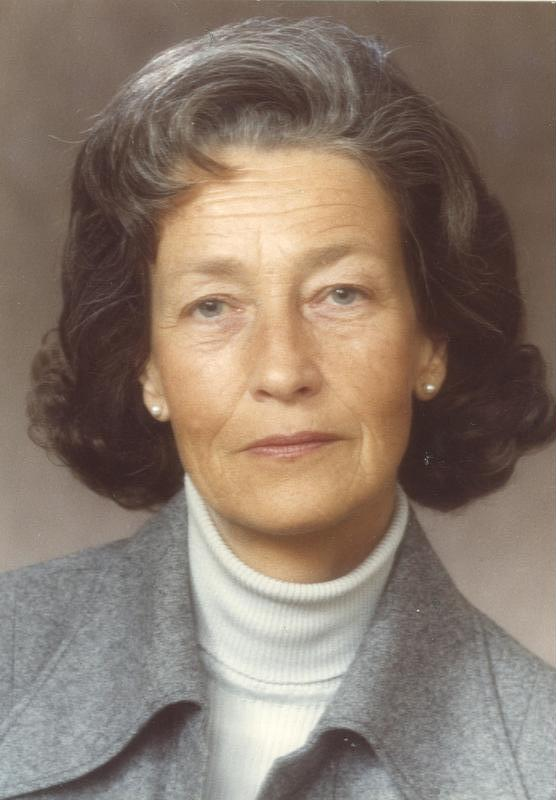
- Katharina Focke (1975)

Federal Minister for Youth, Family and Health
- In office 15 December 1972 – 14 December 1976
- Preceded by: Käte Strobel
- Succeeded by: Antje Huber

Personal details
- Born: Elsbeth Charlotte Katharina Friedlaender; 8 October 1922 Bonn, Rhine Province, Prussia
- Died: 10 July 2016 (aged 93) Cologne, Germany
- Party: Social Democratic Party (SPD)
- Education: University of Hamburg
- Profession: Politician

Katharina Focke (8 October 1922 – 10 July 2016) was a German politician of the Social Democratic Party of Germany (SPD). She served as Federal Minister of Family Affairs, Senior Citizens, Women and Youth from 1972 to 1976.

== Biography ==
Katharina was the daughter of the publicist and European politician Ernst Friedlaender († 1973) and the doctor Franziska Schulz. Her ancestors included Martin Luther.

From 1929 to 1931, Katharina Friedlaender lived with her family in the United States because her father was one of the directors of Agfa there. From 1931 to 1934 they lived in Switzerland, and from 1934 to 1945 in Liechtenstein because her father had concerns about returning to Germany in view of the political developments. She passed her university entrance examination at the Gymnasium Fridericianum (1941?), a German school abroad in Davos.

Focke studied Economics at the University of Zürich and studied English, German, and History at the University of Hamburg. She studied political science at the University of Oklahoma and received a Ph.D. in 1954. The same year, she married Ernst Günter Focke, a European politician who was then Secretary General of the Europa-Union Deutschland, the German Council of the European Movement. He died in 1961. She joined the Social Democrats in 1964 and was elected two years later to the Düsseldorf parliament. She was elected to the Bundestag in 1969. Chancellor Willy Brandt selected her to be the Parliamentary Secretary to the Chancellery, where she also dealt with European issues.

In 1972 Focke was put in charge of the Federal Ministry for Youth, Family and Health, a position she held for four years. In the Bundestag, she served from 1969 to 1980. From 1980 until 1989 Focke served at the European Parliament. She lived in Cologne after her retirement and died there on 10 July 2016, aged 93.
