= Ingmar Jung =

German politician (born 1978)

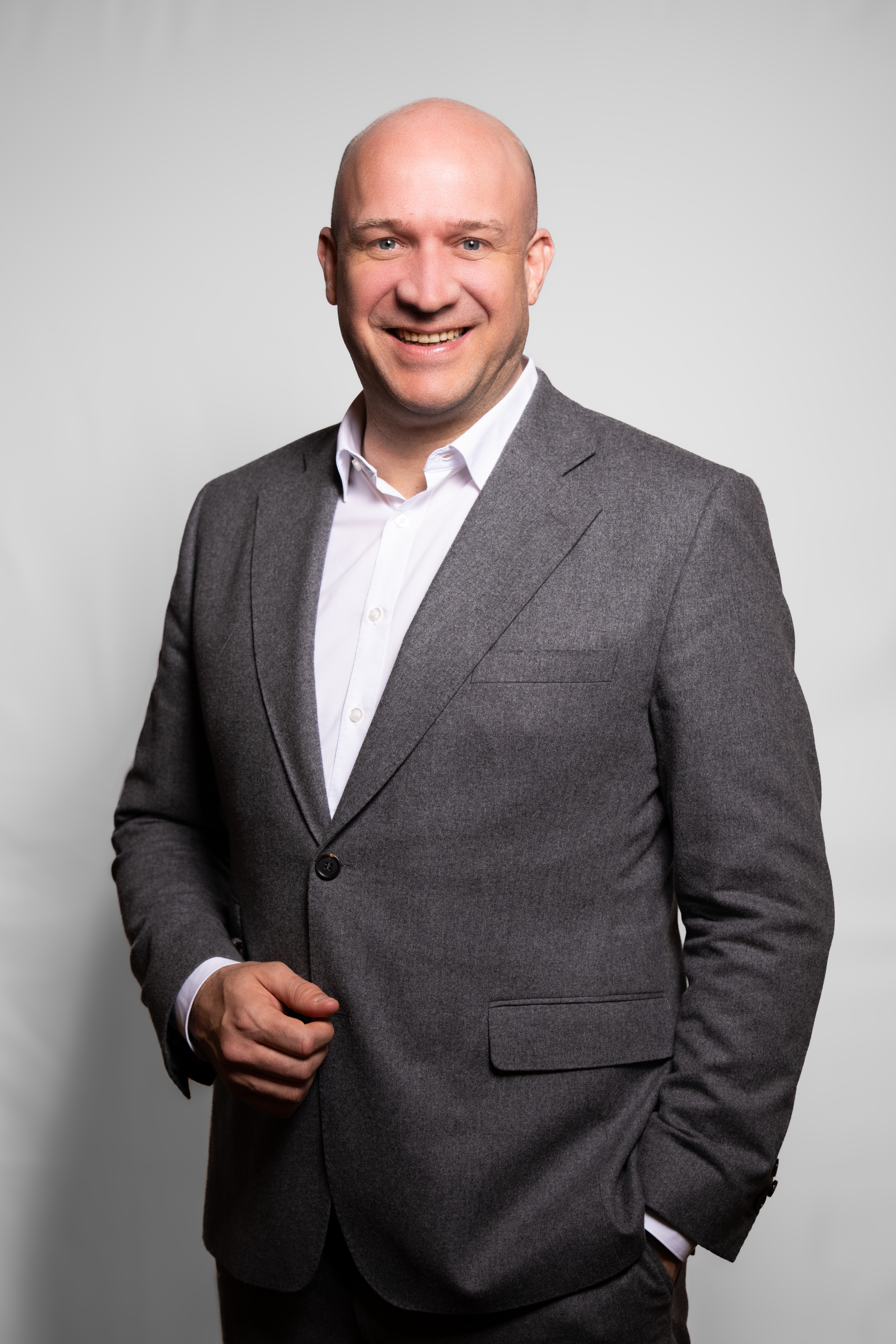
- Jung in 2024

Minister for Agriculture and Environment, Viticulture, Forestry, Hunting and Regional Affairs of Hesse
- Incumbent
- Assumed office 18 January 2024
- Minister-President: Boris Rhein
- Preceded by: Priska Hinz

Member of the Bundestag; for Wiesbaden
- In office 24 October 2017 – 25 January 2024
- Preceded by: Kristina Schröder
- Succeeded by: Astrid Mannes

Personal details
- Born: Ingmar Ludwig Jung; 4 April 1978 (age 48) Wiesbaden, West Germany
- Party: Christian Democratic Union
- Children: 1
- Relatives: Franz Josef Jung (uncle)
- Education: Goethe University Frankfurt; University of Mainz

Ingmar Ludwig Jung (born 4 April 1978) is a German lawyer and politician of the Christian Democratic Union (CDU) who has been serving as State Minister of Economic Affairs, Energy, Transport and Housing in the government of Minister-President Boris Rhein of Hesse since 2024. From 2017 to 2024, he was a member of the Bundestag from the state of Hesse.

== Early career ==
From 2010 until 2017, Jung served as State Secretary at the State Ministry of Science in the government of Minister President Volker Bouffier of Hesse, under the leadership of successive ministers Eva Kühne-Hörmann (2010–2014) and Boris Rhein (2014–2017).

== Political career ==
=== Member of the German Parliament (2017–2024) ===
Jung became a member of the Bundestag after the 2017 German federal election. In parliament, he was a member of the Committee on Legal Affairs and Consumer Protection and its Subcommittee on European Law.

=== Career in state government ===
As one of the state’s representatives at the Bundesrat since 2024, Jung has been serving on the Committee on Agricultural Policy and Consumer Protection and the Committee on the Environment, Nature Conservation and Nuclear Safety. In the cause of his appointment as a state minister in Second Rhein cabinet. He resigned his seat in the Bundestag on 25 January 2024.

== Other activities ==
- Magnus Hirschfeld Foundation, Alternate Member of the Board of Trustees (since 2022)

He was appointed the new Chairman of the Supervisory Board of Hessische Staatsweingüter Kloster Eberbach in November 2024.
