= Kristina Schröder =

German politician (born 1977)

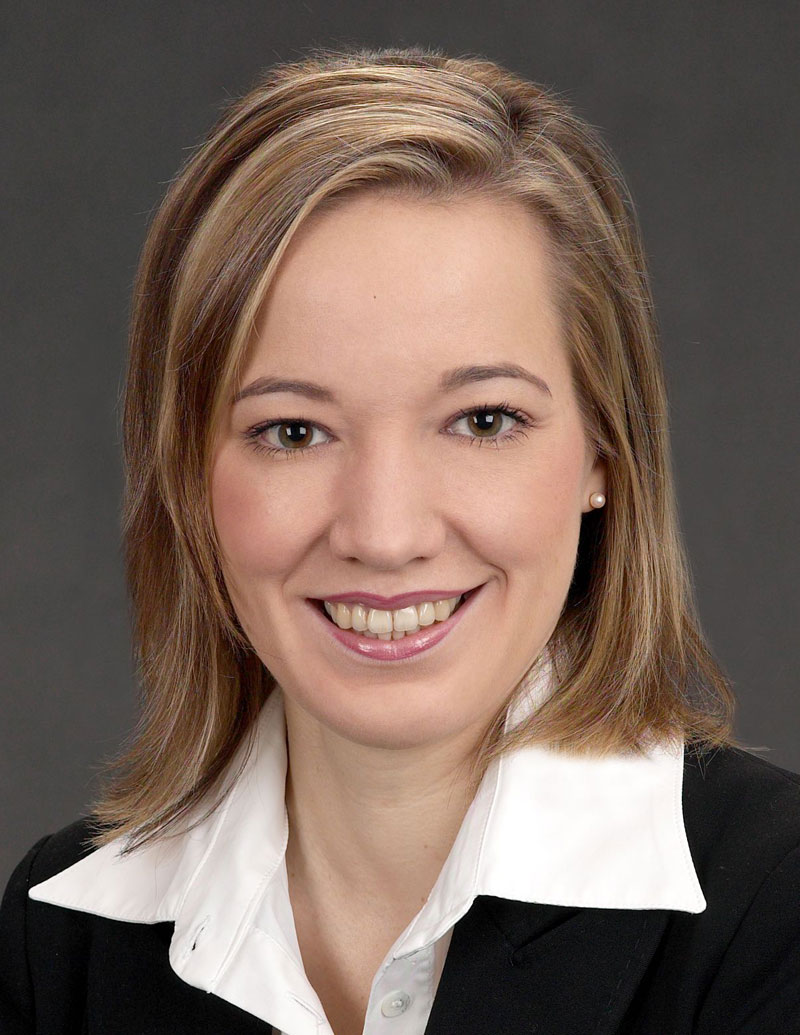
- Schröder in 2007

Minister for Family Affairs, Senior Citizens, Women and Youth
- In office 30 November 2009 – 17 December 2013
- Chancellor: Angela Merkel
- Preceded by: Ursula von der Leyen
- Succeeded by: Manuela Schwesig

Member of the Bundestag; from Hesse
- In office 17 October 2002 – 24 October 2017
- Preceded by: Multi-member district
- Succeeded by: Ingmar Jung
- Constituency: State list (2002–2009); Wiesbaden (2009–2017)

Personal details
- Born: Kristina Köhler; 3 August 1977 (age 49) Wiesbaden, West Germany
- Party: Christian Democratic Union
- Spouse: Ole Schröder (m. 2010)
- Children: 3
- Education: University of Mainz (Dipl., PhD)
- Profession: Sociologist
- Website: kristinaschroeder.de

Kristina Schröder (née Köhler; born 3 August 1977) is a German politician who served as the Federal Minister of Family Affairs, Senior Citizens, Women and Youth in the government of Chancellor Angela Merkel from 2009 to 2013. She served as a Member of Parliament between 2002 and 2017.

== Early life and education ==
Schröder was born Kristina Köhler in Wiesbaden, Hessen. After finishing her abitur in 1997, she studied sociology, history, philosophy, and political science at Johannes Gutenberg University of Mainz. She earned her Diplom in 2002, and her Ph.D. in 2009. Her doctoral thesis was Gerechtigkeit als Gleichheit? Eine empirische Analyse der objektiven und subjektiven Responsivität von Bundestagsabgeordneten (English: "Justice as equality? An empirical analysis of the objective and subjective responsivity of members of parliament"), supervised by Jürgen W. Falter.

Following Schröder's appointment as government minister, her doctoral research came under close scrutiny for its heavy reliance on research assistance by her party. In 2011 it was reported that an assistant of Falter had been paid by Schröder for working on the statistical data on which the thesis was based. The university's president stated there was no evidence for any wrongdoing, and that legwork undertaken by aides was scientifically legitimate and accepted practice.

== Political career ==
Schröder joined the Junge Union in 1991 and has been a member of the Bundestag since 2002, affiliated with the CDU. Between 2002 and 2009, she served as member on the Committee on Internal Affairs. In 2005, she also joined an inquiry committee investigating the involvement of German intelligence services in the Iraq War.

On 30 November 2009, Schröder was appointed Federal Minister for Family Affairs, Senior Citizens, Women and Youth in the cabinet of Angela Merkel. During her time in office, the government approved a bill to provide parents of 1- and 2-year-old children with an allowance for keeping their toddlers out of state-run day care, a move that critics said would derail recent efforts to encourage German women to return to work after starting a family. Amid a conflict within her own political party over the question of setting a statutory quota for female participation in the supervisory boards of companies in Germany, Schröder backed a voluntary scheme.

When Germany's government reduced compulsory military service from nine months to six in 2009, Schröder took the lead on introducing the Federal Volunteers Service (BFD), a German government program which encourages volunteerism among young adults for public welfare, to fill the gaps left by changes to the national service system.

Unlike many in her party at the time, Schröder spoke out in support of civil unions in 2012, saying that "in lesbian and gay life partnerships, people take lasting responsibility for one another and thus they live according to conservative values."

Since the 2013 elections, Schröder has been the deputy chairwoman of the Committee on the Scrutiny of Elections, Immunity and the Rules of Procedure, which is chaired by Johann Wadephul. In addition, she serves as member of the Committee on Economic Affairs and Energy, where she is her parliamentary group's rapporteur on the media, food and pharmaceutical industries as well as on space technology.

In April 2016, Schröder announced that she would not stand in the 2017 federal elections but instead resign from active politics by the end of the parliamentary term. By the end of the parliamentary term, she joined communication consultancy Deekeling Arndt Advisors as Senior Advisor.

== Other activities ==
- Federal Network Agency for Electricity, Gas, Telecommunications, Posts and Railway, Member of the advisory board (since 2014)
- ZNS – Hannelore Kohl Stiftung, President (since 2011)
- German-Israeli Association (DIG), Member
- German Africa Foundation (DAS), Member
- Order of Saint John's Nursing Sisterhood, Member of the supervisory board (2002-2008)

== Personal life ==
Schröder lives in Berlin and Wiesbaden-Sonnenberg with her husband Ole Schröder, a fellow member of the Bundestag. Shortly after her appointment, the two announced that they were planning to get married in February 2010 and did so on 12 February 2010. In January 2011, it was announced that Schröder was pregnant with her first child, who was born in June 2011, and that she would try not to take time off during the pregnancy. She is the first German cabinet member to ever give birth to a child while in office. In 2014 she gave birth to her second child, a daughter.

Schröder is a member of the Independent Evangelical-Lutheran Church.
