= Rudi Schmitt =

German politician (1928–2026)

Member of the Bundestag; from Hesse
- In office 4 November 1980 – 18 February 1987
- Preceded by: Horst Krockert
- Succeeded by: Multi-member district
- Constituency: Wiesbaden (1980–1983); State list (1983–1987)

Member of the Landtag of Hesse
- In office 1 December 1954 – 31 January 1968
- Preceded by: Otto Etz
- Succeeded by: Renate Steiner
- Constituency: Wahlkreis 34 (1954–1962); State list (1962–1966); Wahlkreis 25 (1966–1968)

Personal details
- Born: 8 January 1928 Frankfurt, Germany
- Died: 10 April 2026 (aged 98) Wiesbaden, Germany
- Party: Social Democratic
- Occupation: Teacher

Rudi Schmitt (8 January 1928 – 10 April 2026) was a German politician. A member of the Social Democratic Party, he served in the Landtag of Hesse from 1954 to 1968 and in the Bundestag from 1980 to 1987.

Schmitt died in Wiesbaden on 10 April 2026, at the age of 98.
