= Sascha Müller (politician) =

German politician (born 1970)

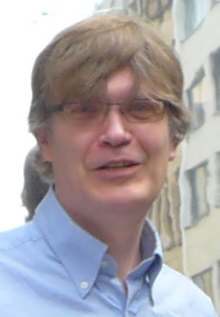
- Müller in 2017

Member of the Bundestag
- Incumbent
- Assumed office 26 October 2021

Personal details
- Born: 24 April 1970 (age 55) Essen, Germany
- Party: Alliance 90/The Greens

Sascha Müller (born 24 April 1970) is a German sports journalist and politician of the Alliance 90/The Greens who has been serving as a member of the Bundestag after the 2021 German federal election, representing the Nuremberg South district.

== Political career ==
In parliament, Müller has been serving on the Finance Committee.

== Other activities ==
- Federal Financial Supervisory Authority (BaFin), Member of the Administrative Council (since 2021)
- German United Services Trade Union (ver.di), Member
