= Michael Frieser =

German politician (born 1964)

Michael Frieser MdB
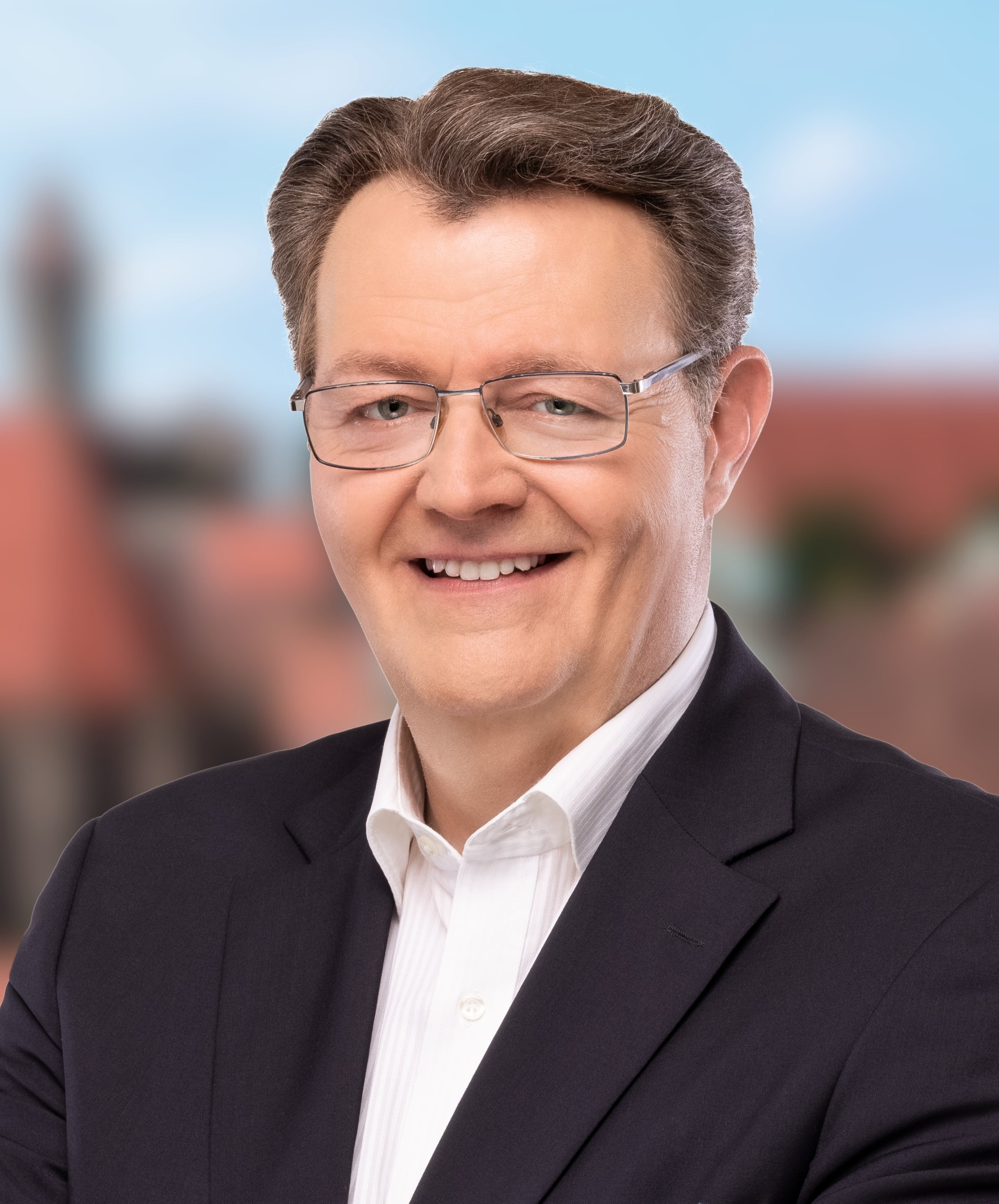
- Frieser in 2021

Member of the Bundestag; for Nuremberg South
- Incumbent
- Assumed office 27 October 2009
- Preceded by: Renate Blank

Personal details
- Born: 30 March 1964 (age 62) Nuremberg, West Germany
- Party: Christian Social Union
- Education: University of Erlangen–Nuremberg

Michael Frieser (born 30 March 1964) is a German lawyer and politician of the Christian Social Union (CSU) who has been serving as a member of the Bundestag from the state of Bavaria since 2009.

== Political career ==
Frieser became a member of the Bundestag in the 2009 German federal election, representing Nuremberg. In parliament, he first served on the Committee on Human Rights and Humanitarian Aid (2009-2013), the Committee on Legal Affairs (2009-2013) and the Committee on Internal Affairs (2009-2017).

Since 2018, Frieser has been a member of the Committee on Cultural Affairs and the Media and the Committee on the Verification of Credentials, Immunities and Rules of Procedure. He is an alternate member of the Committee on the Election of Judges (Wahlausschuss), which is in charge of appointing judges to the Federal Constitutional Court of Germany. Since 2022, he has also been serving on the parliamentary body in charge of appointing judges to the Highest Courts of Justice, namely the Federal Court of Justice (BGH), the Federal Administrative Court (BVerwG), the Federal Fiscal Court (BFH), the Federal Labour Court (BAG), and the Federal Social Court (BSG).

In addition to his committee assignments, Frieser joined a cross-party working group on a reform of Germany's electoral system in 2019, chaired by Wolfgang Schäuble.

== Political positions ==
In June 2017, Frieser voted against Germany's introduction of same-sex marriage.
