= Elisabeth Schwarzhaupt =

German politician (1901–1986)

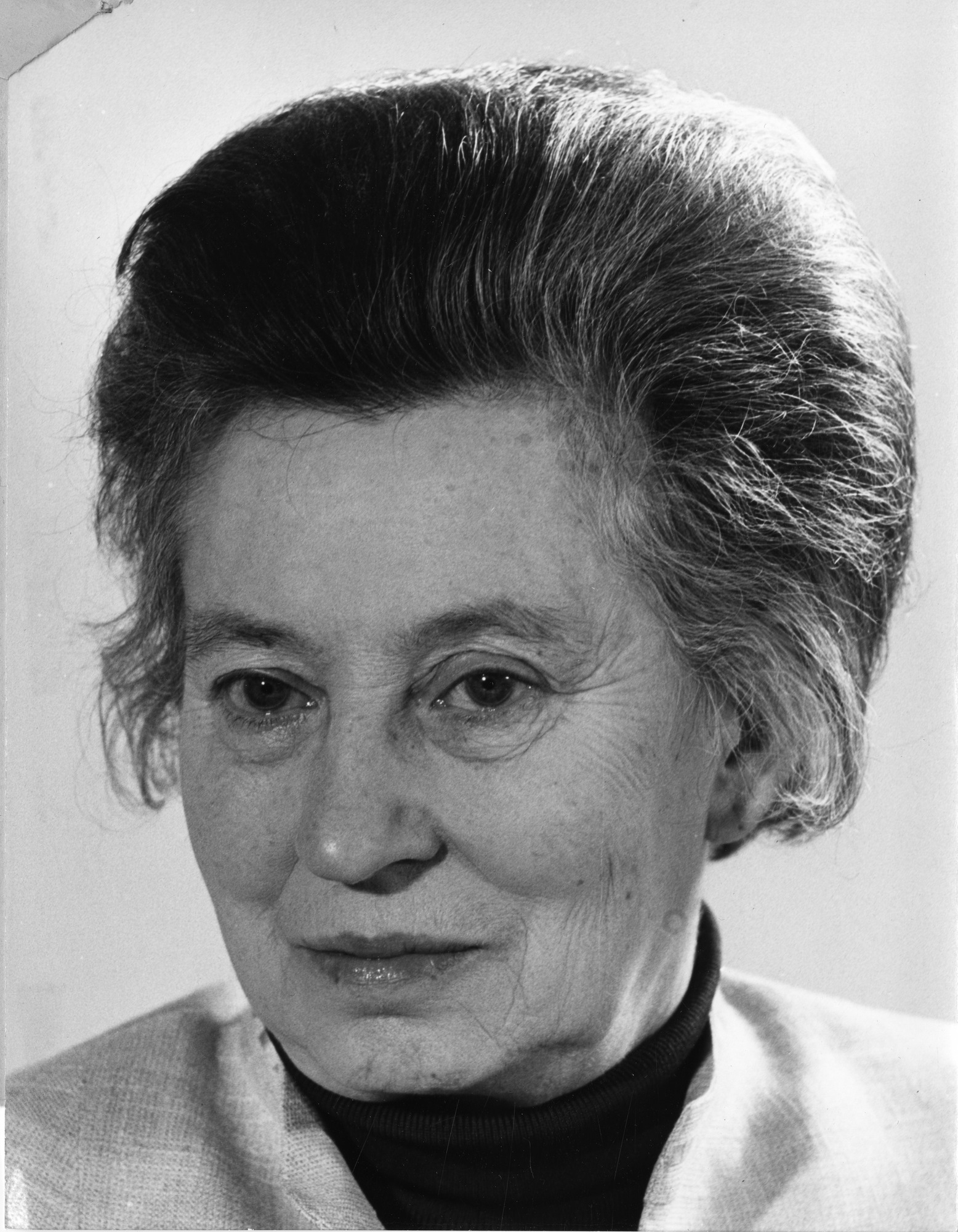
- Schwarzhaupt in 1966

Minister for Health Affairs
- In office 14 November 1961 – 30 November 1966
- Chancellor: Konrad Adenauer; Ludwig Erhard
- Preceded by: Office established
- Succeeded by: Käte Strobel

Member of the Bundestag; from Hesse
- In office 6 October 1953 – 20 October 1969
- Constituency: State list (1953–1957); Wiesbaden (1957–1961); State list (1961–1969)

Personal details
- Born: Emma Sophie Elisabeth Schwarzhaupt; 7 January 1901 Frankfurt, Germany
- Died: 30 October 1986 (aged 85) Frankfurt, West Germany
- Resting place: Frankfurt Main Cemetery
- Party: Christian Democratic Union
- Other political affiliations: DVP (before 1933)

Elisabeth Schwarzhaupt (7 January 1901 – 30 October 1986) was a German politician of the Christian Democratic Union (CDU). She was Federal Minister of Health in the German Cabinet from 1961 to 1966, the first woman to hold a Ministerial position in Germany.

== Biography ==
Schwarzhaupt was the daughter of an upper school principal who belonged to the German People's Party of Prussia. Her mother came from a wealthy merchant family. She was engaged to a Jewish doctor who fled to Switzerland and then the United States because of Nazi persecution.

After finishing school in 1920, Schwarzhaupt studied law in Frankfurt am Main. In 1930, she received her doctorate in law. She was a legal adviser on women's issues until 1932 when she worked as a Beauftragter Richter ("Mandated Judge") in Dortmund and Frankfurt am Main. She was dismissed in March 1933 in the wake of a judicial decree that women should no longer hold judicial office.

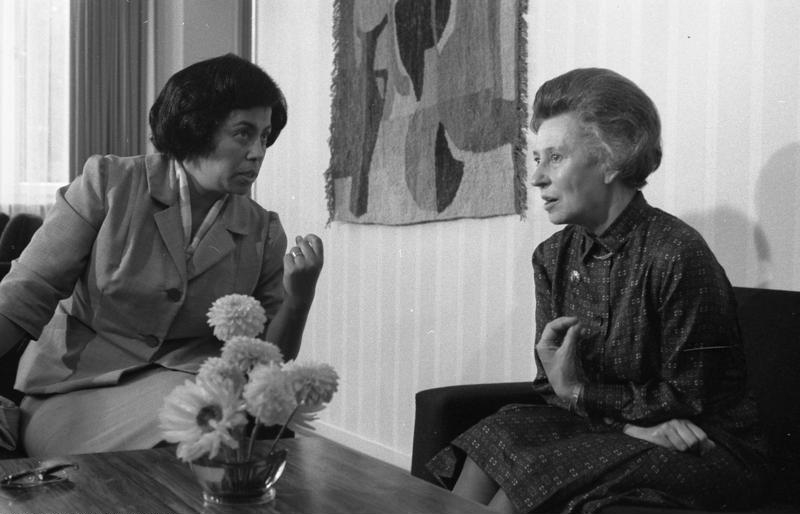
Schwarzhaupt (right) in 1963 with the Egyptian Minister of Social Affairs Hikmat Abu Zayd

From 1935, Schwarzhaupt worked as a legal assistant at the Registry of the Evangelical Church in Berlin. In 1947, she returned to Frankfurt, promoted by 1953 to Oberkirchenrätin ("Senior Church Adviser") and Geschäftsführerin der Evangelischen Frauenarbeit ("Director of Evangelical Women's Work").

On 10 December 1965, she was the first woman to be awarded the Großkreuz des Bundesverdienstkreuzes (loosely, "Grand Cross of the German Federal Cross of Merit"). From 1970 to 1972, she was the First Chairman of the German Women's Council.

During the Weimar Republic, Schwarzhaupt was a member of the German People's Party. She belonged to the Christian Democratic Union from 1945 until her death. She was buried in the Frankfurt Main Cemetery.

== Offices and achievements ==
From 1953 to 1969, Schwarzhaupt was a member of the German Bundestag. From 1957 to 1961, she was Deputy Chairman of the CDU/CSU Parliamentary Group. Unlike most women in the party, she was vehemently opposed to a ruling called the "Stitch" ruling (pertaining to the rights of the husband in marital disputes). Together with Margot Kalinke she orchestrated support for an opposition amendment to her own party's bill. The Gesetz über die Gleichstellung von Mann und Frau auf dem Gebiet des bürgerlichen Rechts ("Law of Equality between Man and Wife in Civil Law") was enacted on 18 June 1957 without the Stitch Clause. In 1997 the German government issued a postage stamp with her image.

== Publications ==
- "Die Frau in Regierungs- und Oppositionsparteien", in Neue Evangelische Frauenzeitung, 1965, Heft 2, pp. 34–38.
- "Aufzeichnungen und Erinnerungen", in Abgeordnete des Deutschen Bundestages. Aufzeichnungen und Erinnerungen, Band 2, Boppard am Rhein, 1983, pp. 235–283.

== Sources ==
- Hessische Landesregierung (Hrsg): Elisabeth Schwarzhaupt – Portrait einer streitbaren Politikerin und Christin (1901–1986). Herder Verlag, 2001, ISBN 3-451-20139-9
