= Federal Ministry for Education, Family Affairs, Senior Citizens, Women and Youth =

Federal ministry of the Federal Republic of Germany

Federal Ministry for Education, Family Affairs, Senior Citizens, Women and Youth (BMBFSFJ)
- German: Bundesministerium für Bildung, Familie, Senioren, Frauen und Jugend
- Official logo since 6 May 2025

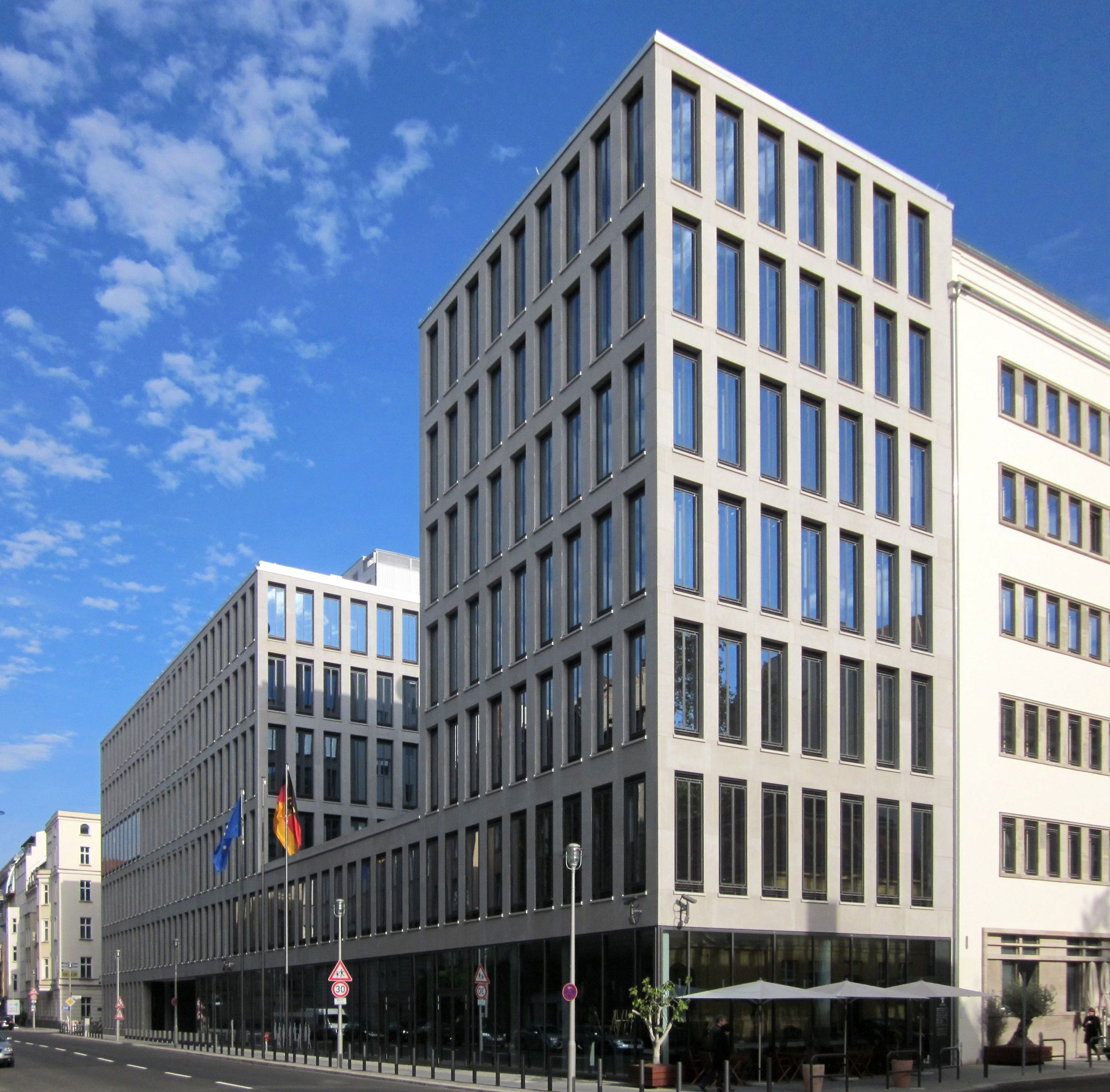
- Headquarters of the BMBFSFJ in Berlin-Mitte

Agency overview
- Formed: 1953 as the Bundesministerium für Familienfragen
- Jurisdiction: Government of Germany
- Headquarters: Berlin, Germany; 52.51331°N 13.38671°E
- Employees: 828 (2025)
- Annual budget: €16.664 billion (2026)
- Minister responsible: Karin Prien, Federal Minister for Education, Family Affairs, Senior Citizens, Women and Youth
- Agency executives: Mareike Wulf, Parliamentary State Secretary; Michael Brand, Parliamentary State Secretary
- Website: bmbfsfj.bund.de

The Federal Ministry for Education, Family Affairs, Senior Citizens, Women and Youth (German: Bundesministerium für Bildung, Familie, Senioren, Frauen und Jugend; abbreviated BMBFSFJ) is a cabinet-level ministry of the Federal Republic of Germany. It is headquartered in Berlin with a secondary seat in Bonn.

The ministry has been headed by Karin Prien since 6 May 2025.

== History ==
The original organization was first founded in 1953 as the Federal Ministry for Family Affairs (Bundesministerium für Familienfragen). In 1957, this was changed to the Ministry for Family and Youth Affairs (Bundesministerium für Familien- und Jugendfragen) and in 1963 to the Federal Ministry for Family and Youth (Bundesministerium für Familie und Jugend. In 1969 after the incorporation of the Federal Ministry for Health (Bundesministerium für Gesundheit, created in 1961), it was changed to the Federal Ministry for Youth, Family and Health (Bundesministerium für Jugend, Familie und Gesundheit). In 1986, it was renamed to the Federal Ministry for Youth, Family, Women, and Health (Bundesministerium für Jugend, Familie, Frauen und Gesundheit). The area of health was removed in 1991 and transferred to the Federal Ministry for Health. The remaining Ministry was divided into the Federal Ministry for Women and Youth (Bundesministerium für Frauen und Jugend), and the Federal Ministry for Family and Senior Citizens (Bundesministerium für Familie und Senioren). In 1994, these divided areas were recombined into the Federal Ministry for Family Affairs, Senior Citizens, Women and Youth (Bundesministerium für Familie, Senioren, Frauen und Jugend).

In the Merz cabinet since 6 May 2025, the education portfolio has been removed from the Federal Ministry of Research, Technology and Space and transferred to the Ministry of Family Affairs. Since then, the ministry has been called the Federal Ministry for Education, Family Affairs, Senior Citizens, Women and Youth (Bundesministerium für Bildung, Familie, Senioren, Frauen und Jugend).

== Organisation ==
=== Departments ===
With the new assignment of tasks to the BMBFSFJ, the organisation was restructured. According to the organisational chart, which reflects the status as of June 2026, there are nine departments:

- Department L: Management Department
- Department Z: Central Services
- Department G: Principle and Digitalisation
- Department 1: Democracy and Engagement
- Department 2: Family
- Department 3: Women and Equality
- Department 4: Early and School Education, Educational Research
- Department 5: Vocational Education and Lifelong Learning
- Department 6: Intergenerational Justice, Youth, Older People

=== Agencies and commissioners ===
The BMBFSFJ has the following subordinate authorities and commissioners (as of 2026):

- Federal Office of Family Affairs and Civil Society Functions
- Independent Federal Commissioner against Sex Abuse of Children and Adolescents
- Federal Government Commissioner against Antiziganism and for the Life of Sinti and Roma in Germany
- Federal Anti-Discrimination Agency
- Federal Government Commissioner for the Acceptance of Sexual and Gender Diversity
- Federal Agency for Child and Youth Protection in the Media
- Federal Volunteers Service

== Federal Ministers ==
Political Party: CDU SPD Green

Name (Born-Died)		Portrait	Party	Term of Office		Chancellor (Cabinet)
Federal Minister for Family Affairs (1953–1957) Federal Minister for Family and Youth Affairs (1957–1963) Federal Minister for Family and Youth (1963–1969)
1	Franz-Josef Wuermeling (1900–1986)		CDU	20 October 1953	13 December 1962	Adenauer (II • III • IV)
2	Bruno Heck (1917–1989)		CDU	14 December 1962	2 October 1968	Adenauer (V); Erhard (I • II); Kiesinger (I)
3	Aenne Brauksiepe (1912–1997)		CDU	16 October 1968	21 October 1969	Kiesinger (I)
Federal Minister for Youth, Family and Health (1969–1986) Federal Minister for Youth, Family, Women and Health (1986–1991)
4	Käte Strobel (1907–1996)		SPD	22 October 1969	15 December 1972	Brandt (I)
5	Katharina Focke (1922–2016)		SPD	15 December 1972	14 December 1976	Brandt (II); Schmidt (I)
6	Antje Huber (1924–2015)		SPD	16 December 1976	28 April 1982	Schmidt (II • III)
7	Anke Fuchs (1937–2019)		SPD	28 April 1982	1 October 1982	Schmidt (III)
8	Heiner Geißler (1930–2017)		CDU	4 October 1982	26 September 1985	Kohl (I • II)
9	Rita Süssmuth (1937–2026)		CDU	26 September 1985	9 December 1988	Kohl (II • III)
10	Ursula Lehr (1930–2022)		CDU	9 December 1988	18 January 1991	Kohl (III)
Federal Minister for Family and Senior Citizens				18 January 1991	17 November 1994	Kohl (IV)
11a	Hannelore Rönsch (b. 1942)		CDU	18 January 1991	17 November 1994	Kohl (IV)
Federal Minister for Women and Youth				18 January 1991	17 November 1994	Kohl (IV)
11b	Angela Merkel (b. 1954)		CDU	18 January 1991	17 November 1994	Kohl (IV)
Federal Minister for Family, Senior Citizens, Women and Youth
12	Claudia Nolte (b. 1966)		CDU	17 November 1994	26 October 1998	Kohl (V)
13	Christine Bergmann (b. 1939)		SPD	27 October 1998	22 October 2002	Schröder (I)
14	Renate Schmidt (b. 1943)		SPD	22 October 2002	22 November 2005	Schröder (II)
15	Ursula von der Leyen (b. 1958)		CDU	22 November 2005	30 November 2009	Merkel (I)
16	Kristina Schröder (b. 1977)		CDU	30 November 2009	17 December 2013	Merkel (II)
17	Manuela Schwesig (b. 1974)		SPD	17 December 2013	2 June 2017	Merkel (III)
18	Katarina Barley (b. 1968)		SPD	2 June 2017	14 March 2018	Merkel (III)
19	Franziska Giffey (b. 1978)		SPD	14 March 2018	20 May 2021	Merkel (IV)
20	Christine Lambrecht (b. 1965)		SPD	20 May 2021	8 December 2021	Merkel (IV)
21	Anne Spiegel (b. 1980)		Green	8 December 2021	25 April 2022	Scholz (I)
22	Lisa Paus (b. 1968)		Green	25 April 2022	6 May 2025	Scholz (I)
Federal Minister for Education, Family Affairs, Senior Citizens, Women and Youth
23	Karin Prien (b. 1965)		CDU	6 May 2025	Incumbent	Merz (I)

== Others ==
The activities of the Ministry were highlighted in media coverage in 2007 when the contents of one of the leaflets it distributed was claimed to encourage sexual massage between parents and their children. The leaflets were removed from circulation when the matter became national news.
