= Federal Ministry of Health (Germany) =

Cabinet-level ministry of Germany

Federal Ministry of Health (BMG)
- Bundesministerium für Gesundheit

Agency overview
- Formed: 1961
- Jurisdiction: Government of Germany
- Headquarters: Rochusstraße 1 53123 Bonn; Mauerstraße 29 10117 Berlin
- Employees: 915 (2025)
- Annual budget: €20.088 billion (2026)
- Minister responsible: Carsten Linnemann, Federal Minister of Health
- Agency executive: Georg Tippels, Parliamentary State Secretary; Tino Sorge, Permanent State Secretary
- Website: www.bundesgesundheitsministerium.de

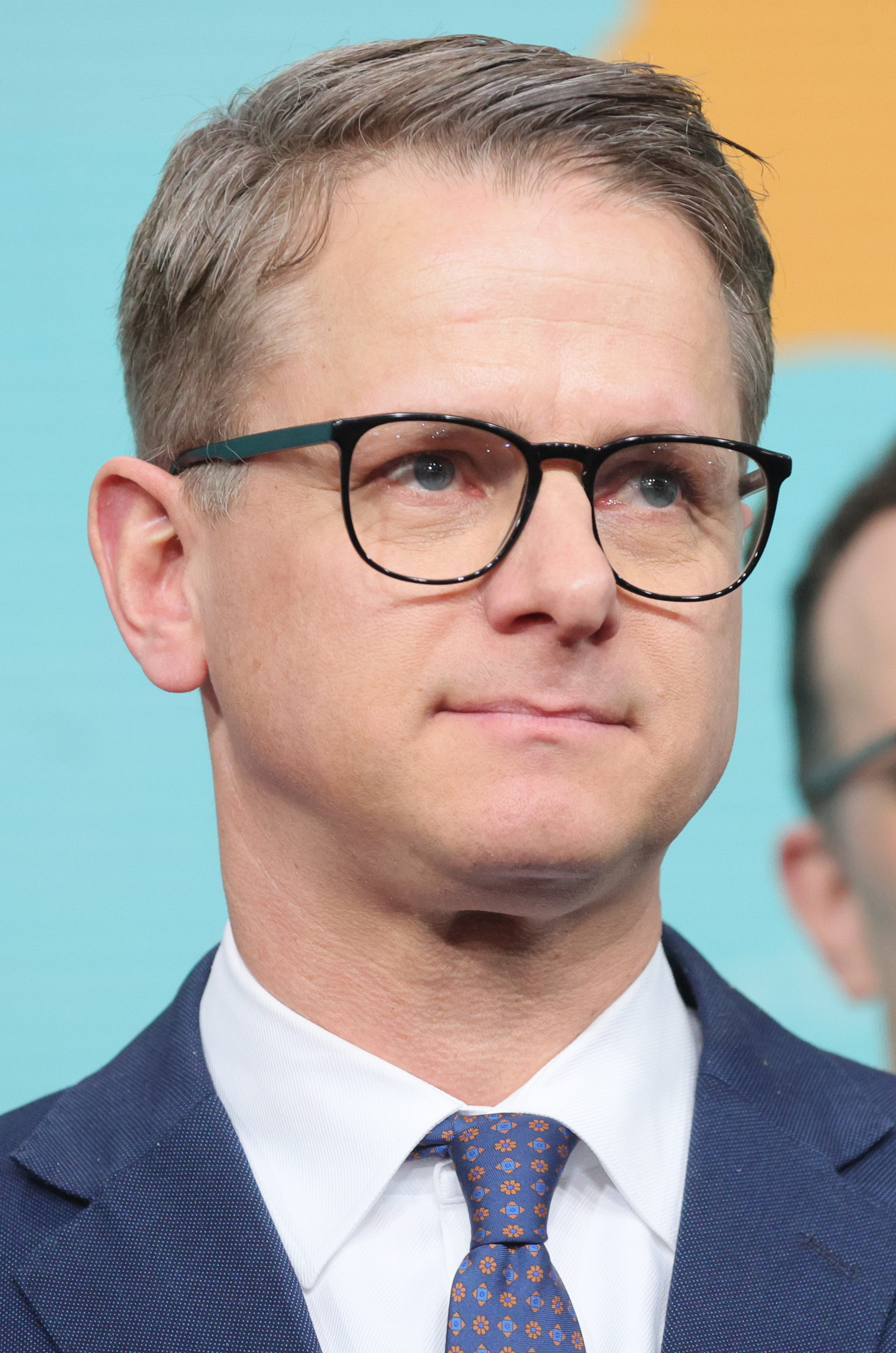
Carsten Linnemann (CDU), Bundesminister für Gesundheit

The Federal Ministry of Health (German: Bundesministerium für Gesundheit, pronounced [ˈbʊndəsminɪsˌteːʁiʊm fyːɐ̯ ɡəˈzʊnthaɪt]; abbreviated BMG) is a cabinet-level ministry of the Federal Republic of Germany. It is the highest German federal government department responsible for health. The ministry is officially located in Bonn and with a second office, which houses the ministry's management, located in Berlin.

== History ==
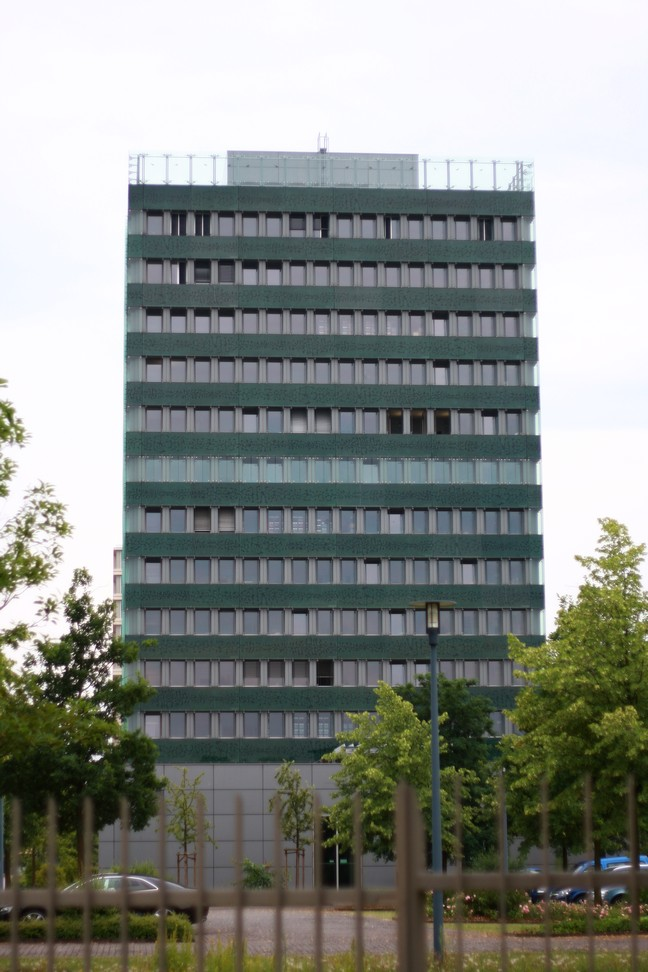
The Ministerial building in Bonn

The Federal Ministry of Health was founded in 1961; in 1969 it was merged with the Federal Ministry for Family and Youth to create the new Federal Ministry for Youth, Family and Health.

In 1991, the Federal Ministry of Health was restored. In 2002, it was expanded to include social affairs and renamed "Federal Ministry of Health and Social Security" (Bundesministerium für Gesundheit und Soziale Sicherung). It was headed by the Federal Minister for Health and Social Security. Its portfolio included one part of the former Federal Ministry of Labour and the Social Order. The other part of the latter was added to the portfolio of the newly created Federal Ministry for Economics and Labour. Under the grand coalition headed by Angela Merkel in 2005, the portfolio reshuffle was reversed and responsibility for social affairs was moved back to the Federal Ministry of Labour and Social affairs (Bundesministerium für Arbeit und Soziales).

== Ministers ==
Political Party: CDU CSU SPD Green FDP

Name (Born–Died)		Portrait	Party	Term of Office		Chancellor (Cabinet)
Federal Minister for Health Affairs (1961–1969) Federal Minister for Youth, Family and Health (1969–1986) Federal Minister for Youth, Family, Women and Health (1986–1991)
1	Dr. Elisabeth Schwarzhaupt (1901–1986)		CDU	14 November 1961	30 November 1966	Adenauer (IV • V); Erhard (I • II)
2	Käte Strobel (1907–1996)		SPD	1 December 1966	15 December 1972	Kiesinger (I); Brandt (I)
3	Dr. Katharina Focke (1922–2016)		SPD	15 December 1972	14 December 1976	Brandt (II); Schmidt (I)
4	Antje Huber (1924–2015)		SPD	16 December 1976	28 April 1982	Schmidt (II • III)
5	Anke Fuchs (1937–2019)		SPD	28 April 1982	1 October 1982	Schmidt (III)
6	Dr. Heiner Geißler (1930–2017)		CDU	4 October 1982	26 September 1985	Kohl (I • II)
7	Prof. Dr. Rita Süssmuth (1937–2026)		CDU	26 September 1985	9 December 1988	Kohl (II • III)
8	Prof. Dr. Ursula Lehr (1930–2022)		CDU	9 December 1988	18 January 1991	Kohl (III)
Federal Minister for Health (1991–2002, 2005–present) Federal Minister for Health and Social Security (2002–2005)
9	Gerda Hasselfeldt (b. 1950)		CSU	18 January 1991	6 May 1992	Kohl (IV)
10	Horst Seehofer (b. 1949)		CSU	6 May 1992	26 October 1998	Kohl (IV • V)
11	Andrea Fischer (b. 1960)		Green	27 October 1998	12 January 2001	Schröder (I)
12	Ulla Schmidt (b. 1949)		SPD	12 January 2001	27 October 2009	Schröder (I • II); Merkel (I)
13	Dr. Philipp Rösler (b. 1973)		FDP	28 October 2009	12 May 2011	Merkel (II)
14	Daniel Bahr (b. 1976)		FDP	12 May 2011	17 December 2013	Merkel (II)
15	Hermann Gröhe (b. 1961)		CDU	17 December 2013	14 March 2018	Merkel (III)
16	Jens Spahn (b. 1980)		CDU	14 March 2018	8 December 2021	Merkel (IV)
17	Prof. Dr. Karl Lauterbach (b. 1963)		SPD	8 December 2021	6 May 2025	Scholz (I)
18	Nina Warken (b. 1979)		CDU	6 May 2025	29 July 2026	Merz (I)
18	Carsten Linnemann (b. 1977)		CDU	29 July 2026	Incumbent	Merz (I)

== Responsibilities of the Federal Ministry of Health ==
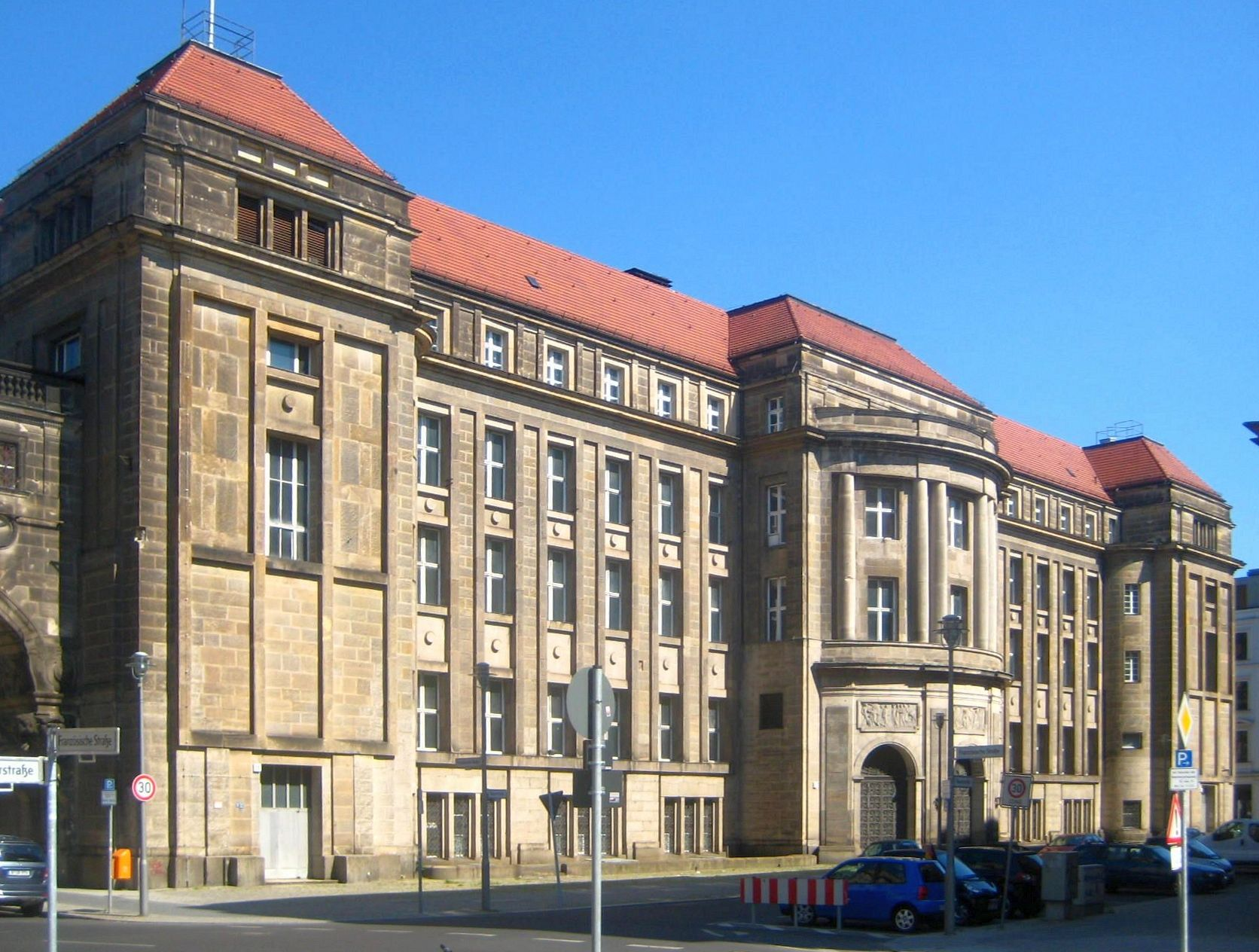
Second office on Mauerstraße in Berlin

The Federal Ministry of Health is responsible for:

- maintaining the effectiveness and efficiency of the statutory health insurance and long-term care insurance systems
- maintaining and enhancing the quality of the health care system
- strengthening the interests of patients
- maintaining economic viability and stabilization of contribution levels
- preventive and prophylactic healthcare
- the Protection against Infection Act (Infektionsschutzgesetz, or IfSG)
- establishing guidelines for the manufacture, clinical trial, approval, distribution channels and monitoring of medicines and medical devices. The objectives are:
  - quality, medical efficacy and safety
  - safety of biological medical products such as blood products
- narcotics and addiction risk prevention
- prevention, rehabilitation and disability policy
  - medical and occupational rehabilitation
  - disability law
  - providing assistance to the disabled and promoting their interests
- European and international health policy, including the work of the Federal Government Narcotics Officer and the patients' ombudsman.

== Supervisory role ==
The Federal Ministry of Health is responsible for the comprehensive (disciplinary) supervision of the following governmental institutions:

- Federal Institute for Drugs and Medical Devices (German: Bundesinstitut für Arzneimittel und Medizinprodukte, abbreviated BfArM) in Bonn,
- Federal Institute of Public Health (German: Bundesinstitut für Öffentliche Gesundheit, abbreviated BIÖG) in Cologne,
- Paul Ehrlich Institute (PEI), the Federal Institute for Vaccines and Biomedicines in Langen, Hesse,
- Robert Koch Institute (RKI), the Federal Research Institute for Disease control and Prevention in Berlin.

The Federal Ministry of Health is also responsible for the non-disciplinary supervision of

- the Federal Office for Social Security (German: Bundesamt für Soziale Sicherung, abbreviated BAS)

and the legal supervision of the umbrella organizations of the statutory health insurance schemes.

== See also ==
- European Commission's Directorate General for Health and Consumer Protection (SANCO)
- Federal Ministry of Health and Social Affairs (2002–2005)
