= Grading in education =

Standardized measurement of academic performance

Grading in education is the application of standardized measurements to evaluate different levels of student achievement in a course. Grades can be expressed as letters (usually A to F), as a range (for example, 1 to 6), percentages, or as numbers out of a possible total (often out of 100). The exact system that is used varies worldwide.

== Significance ==
In some countries, grades are averaged to create a grade point average (GPA). GPA is calculated by using the number of grade points a student earns in a given period of time. A GPA is often calculated for high school, undergraduate, and graduate students. A cumulative grade point average (CGPA) is the average of all the GPAs a student has achieved during their time at the institution. Students are sometimes required to maintain a certain GPA in order to be admitted to a certain academic program or to remain in that program. Grades are also used in decisions to provide a student with financial aid or a scholarship.

Grades are seen as an indicator for academic success and ability, and GPA is thought to indicate future job effectiveness and success. In addition, research has shown a correlation between GPA and future job satisfaction. Studies have also shown that a higher GPA leads to a higher income.

== History ==
Students have been assessed since at least 500 B.C., initially through oral and qualitative methods. While early Western education lacked structured measurement, formal methods to track subject mastery were pioneered early on, notably by the Chinese Imperial examination system, which was deeply integrated with the state school system during the Ming and Qing dynasties (1368 – 1644 and c. 1636 – 1912, respectively).

In Europe, the University of Louvain established a formal, four-tier grading scale to evaluate student performance by the mid-1400s. Formal assessment in the United States evolved later; Harvard University began requiring oral exit exams in the mid-1600s; while there is indirect evidence of grading at Harvard beforehand, the first official record of a grading scale in American higher education was documented at Yale University in 1785.

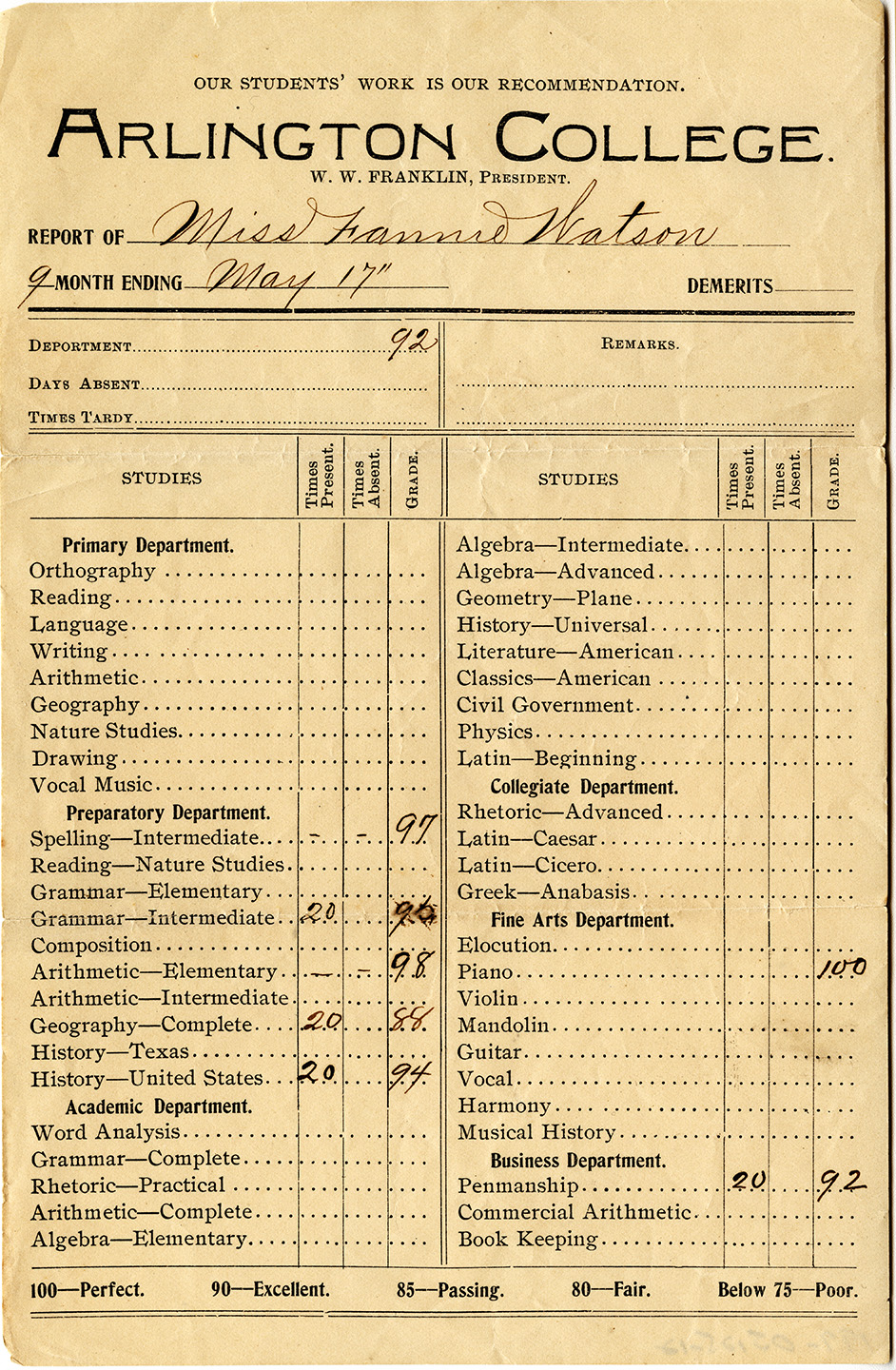
An 1890s report card for a student of Arlington College, with grades being scored out of 100

Yale University historian George Wilson Pierson writes: "According to tradition the first grades issued at Yale (and possibly the first in the country) were given out in the year 1785, when President Ezra Stiles, after examining 58 Seniors, recorded in his diary that there were 'Twenty Optimi, sixteen second Optimi, twelve Inferiores (Boni), ten Pejores.'" By 1837, Yale had converted these adjectives into numbers on a 4-point scale, and some historians say this is the origin of the standard modern American GPA scale.

Bob Marlin argues that the concept of grading students' work quantitatively was developed by a tutor named William Farish and first implemented by the University of Cambridge in 1792. That assertion has been questioned by Christopher Stray, who finds the evidence for Farish as the inventor of the numerical mark to be unpersuasive. Stray's article also explains the complex relationship between the mode of examination (oral or written) and the varying philosophies of education these modes imply to both the teacher and the student.

The A-D/F system was first adopted by Mount Holyoke College in 1897. However, this system did not become widespread until the 1940s, and was still only used by 67% of primary and secondary schools in the United States in 1971.

== Short-term effect ==
Working to earn higher grades can cause students to prioritize short-term learning over life-long learning. These kinds of grades are only short-term snapshots of how much a student has learned in a given period of time and only partially reflect the actual performance. They do not take sufficient account of the individual development of students. Students often do not learn for their future life or out of interest in the material, but only for the grades and the associated status, which promotes bulimic learning.

== Grade validity ==
Questions about grade validity ask how closely grades match student learning. Grades can be inaccurate and may also reflect the bias of the instructor thereby reinforcing systematic bias.

Richard David Precht criticizes the system of school grades in his book Anna, die Schule und der liebe Gott: Der Verrat des Bildungssystems an unseren Kindern. He believes that numbers from 1 to 6 (the school grading system used in Germany) do not do justice to the personalities of the children. In his opinion, grades are neither meaningful nor differentiated and therefore not helpful. For example, the questions whether a student has become more motivated, is more interested in a topic, has learned to deal better with failure and whether he has developed new ideas cannot be answered with grades. Instead, Precht suggests a differentiated written assessment of the students' learning and development path. In his opinion, the grading system comes from a psychologically and pedagogically uninformed era and does not belong in the 21st century. Alternative grading methods, including competency-based assessment, specifications grading, and "ungrading" can be used.

== Effect on motivation ==
Poor grades over a longer period of time would give students the impression that they would learn very little or nothing, which jeopardizes the innate intrinsic motivation of every child to learn. Children who have already lost their desire to learn and only study for their grades have no reason to continue learning after they have achieved the best possible grade. In addition, poor grades represent destructive feedback for students, since they do not provide any constructive assistance, but only absolute key figures. Bad grades can lead to poor future prospects, perplexity, pressure, stress and depression among parents and children.

Margret Rasfeld criticizes the system of grades as unhelpful and, in her opinion, the resulting competitive thinking in schools and says: "School is there to organize success and not to document failure." Gerald Hüther criticizes grades for being responsible for ensuring that students cannot specialize in any topic that they are enthusiastic about and have a talent for, since otherwise their grades in other areas would deteriorate. He also believes that "our society will not develop further...if we force all children to conform to the same evaluation standards".

== Biases in grading ==
In several countries, teachers were shown to systematically give students different grades for an identical work, based on categories like ethnicity or gender. According to the Education Longitudinal Study, "teacher expectations [are] more predictive of college success than most major factors, including student motivation and student effort". Grading bias can be detected by comparing the outcome of exams where the teacher knows the student's characteristics with blind exams where the student is anonymous. This method may underestimate the bias since, for written exams, the handwriting style might still convey information about the student. According to the Experimental Evidence on Teachers' Racial Bias in Student Evaluation, "teachers rated a student's writing sample lower when it was randomly signaled to have a black author versus a white author. This study found that this bias was dependent on the teacher and their relationship and attitude towards race. Other studies apply the same method to cohorts spanning multiple years, to measure each teacher's individual biases. Alternatively, teacher's grading bias can be measured experimentally, by giving teachers a fabricated assignment where only the name (and thus gender and ethnicity) of the student differs.

== Grading systems by country ==
Most nations have their own grading system, and different institutions in a single nation can vary in their grading systems as well. However, several international standards for grading have arisen recently, such as the European Baccalaureate.

== See also ==
- Norm-referenced test (grading on a curve)
- Sudbury school, a school model for ages 4 through 18 with schools internationally with no grading or grade levels
- Competency-based learning, an alternative to the traditional letter grade system
- Mastery Transcript Consortium, a group working to create alternatives to the traditional grading system in secondary schools
- Report card
- Test score
