= Precht (talk show) =

German television show

- Genre: Talk show
- Presented by: Richard David Precht
- Country of origin: Germany
- Original language: German
- No. of episodes: 51 (list of episodes)

Production
- Running time: 45 minutes
- Production company: Interscience Film

Original release
- Release: September 2, 2012

Precht is a German philosophical talk show on ZDF named after the host Richard David Precht who discusses a current issue of social life with a guest from culture, science, business or politics in each episode. It is produced by Interscience Film and was first aired on September 2, 2012.

Each broadcast is 45 minutes long and recorded in a Berlin studio. The broadcast takes place on Sunday evenings between 11:30 p.m. and midnight. All episodes are repeated on 3sat. Gero von Boehm directs while Werner von Bergen is the editor.

For the television program, Precht received, along with two other award winners, the Deutscher Fernsehpreis (German Television Prize) in the category „besondere Leistungen“ ("special achievements") in 2013.

== Concept ==
In the very cinematic, nocturnal studio atmosphere without an audience, everything is concentrated on the two conversation partners. The topics are based on current developments in society or search for applicable knowledge on fundamental questions of human activity.

== Episode list ==
2012
Nr.	First broadcast	Title	Guest
1	September 2, 2012	Skandal Schule – Macht Lernen dumm?	Gerald Hüther
2	October 8, 2012	Gefährliche Freiheit	Mathias Döpfner
3	October 28, 2012	Was ist gerecht?	Christian Lindner
4	December 9, 2012	Dürfen wir Tiere essen?	Robert Spaemann

2013
Nr.	First broadcast	Title	Guest
5	April 8, 2013	Der getunte Mensch – Wie perfekt wollen wir sein?	Juli Zeh
6	May 13, 2013	Wer ist schuld an den Schulden?	Jean-Claude Juncker
7	June 23, 2013	Ende der Geheimnisse: Die gläserne Gesellschaft	Marina Weisband
8	September 8; 2013	Politik ohne Plan – Wer denkt an die Zukunft?	Harald Welzer
9	October 20, 2013	Gute Kriege, schlechte Kriege?	Daniel Cohn-Bendit
10	November 3, 2013	Das Böse im Menschen	Ferdinand von Schirach

2014
Nr.	First broadcast	Title	Guest
11	February 16, 2014	1914/2014 – Lernen wir aus der Geschichte?	Christopher Clark
12	June 8, 2014	Kampfzone Nationalstaat – Brauchen wir noch Grenzen?	Klaus von Dohnanyi
13	July 27, 2014	Affenliebe – Wo ist die Grenze zwischen Mensch und Tier?	Hans Werner Ingensiep
14	September 7, 2014	Big Data – Wer kontrolliert die digitalen Supermächte?	Gabor Steingart
15	October 19, 2014	Die Zukunft der Arbeit – Macht das Netz arbeitslos?	Sascha Lobo
16	November 30, 2014	Von deutschem Wesen – Soll durch uns die Welt genesen?	Jakob Augstein

2015
Nr.	First broadcast	Title	Guest
17	February 1, 2015	Heimatliebe – Fremdenhass – Wie gefährlich ist konservatives Denken?	Christoph Schwennicke
18	April 26, 2015	Wann kommt der Kommunismus? – Über linke Utopien	Sahra Wagenknecht
19	June 14, 2015	Rasender Stillstand – Beschleunigen wir uns zu Tode?	Hartmut Rosa
20	September 13, 2015	Welt in Bewegung – Die Flüchtlinge und wir	Rupert Neudeck
21	October 11, 2015	Europa – Kaputte Gemeinschaft?	Joschka Fischer
22	November 29, 2015	Wozu Glauben?	Feridun Zaimoglu

2016
Nr.	First broadcast	Title	Guest
23	January 31, 2016	Komplexe Welt – Ratlose Menschen	Alexander Kluge
24	April 3, 2016	Unsere ungerechte Gesellschaft	Heinz Bude
25	May 22, 2016	Gutes Deutschland – Böse Kriege: Wie bedroht sind wir?	Herfried Münkler
26	September 4, 2016	Achtung Europa! – Warum immer mehr Menschen der Politik misstrauen	Martin Schulz
27	October 16, 2016	Geld regiert die Welt	Marcel Fratzscher
28	November 27, 2016	Die Herrschaft der Zahlen – Ist alles vermessbar?	Harald Lesch

2017
Nr.	First broadcast	Title	Guest
29	February 5, 2017	Verlust der Mitte – Wohin driftet unsere Gesellschaft?	Nikolaus Blome
30	March 19, 2017	Wie natürlich ist unsere Natur?	Andrea Wulf
31	May 21, 2017	Ewige Kriege – Warum die Völker keinen Frieden finden	Harald Kujat
32	September 11, 2017	Markt und Moral – Der Zustand unserer Wirtschaft	Edzard Reuter
33	November 12, 2017	Wozu braucht der Mensch Religion?	Seyran Ateş
34	December 3, 2017	Angst vor dem Fremden?	Ilija Trojanow

2018
Nr.	First broadcast	Title	Guest
35	February 4, 2018	Betreutes Leben – Wie uns Google, Facebook und Co. beherrschen	Udo Di Fabio
36	April 8, 2018	Verschwörungstheorien – Erfundene Wahrheiten?	Harald Lesch
37	May 6, 2018	Wie aktuell ist Karl Marx?	Gregor Gysi
38	September 16, 2018	Die Zukunft von Mann und Frau	Svenja Flaßpöhler
39	October 7, 2018	Ist die Erde noch zu retten?	Hans Joachim Schellnhuber
40	December 16, 2018	Frisst der Kapitalismus die Demokratie?	Robert Habeck

2019
Nr.	First broadcast	Title	Guest
41	March 31, 2019	Populismus – Das Ende der Demokratien?	Francis Fukuyama
42	April 28, 2019	Mehr Fortschritt, mehr Wohlstand, mehr Glück?	Juli Zeh
43	June 30, 2019	Der Kalte Frieden – Russland und der Westen	Horst Teltschik
44	September 15, 2019	Revolution für das Klima – Eine Generation steht auf	Carla Reemtsma
45	October 20, 2019	Künstliche Intelligenz – Herrschaft der Maschinen?	Jürgen Schmidhuber
46	November 24, 2019	Deutschland – Ein geteiltes Land?	Ingo Schulze

2020
Nr.	First broadcast	Title	Guest
47	March 15, 2020	Ökonomie und Ökologie – Ein Widerspruch?	Maja Göpel
48	May 24, 2020	Verändert Corona unsere Gesellschaft?	Andreas Reckwitz
49	July 5, 2020	Ist Konservativ die Zukunft?	Diana Kinnert
50	September 20, 2020	Schöne neue Medienwelt – Wer hat die Meinungsmacht?	Rezo
51	October 25, 2020	USA und der Westen – Wie bedroht sind unsere Demokratien?	Josef Joffe
