= Walter Blankenburg =

- Blankenburg, in the 1960s
- Born: 31 July 1903; Emleben
- Died: 10 March 1986 (aged 82); Schlüchtern
- Education: University of Rostock; University of Göttingen
- Occupations: Pastor; Musicologist

Walter Blankenburg (31 July 1903 – 10 March 1986) was a German Protestant pastor, director of church music and musicologist, who focused in several publications on liturgy, hymnology, and on the sacred music of the early Baroque period, especially by Johann Sebastian Bach.

== Career ==
Born in Emleben near Gotha, Blankenburg, the son of a pastor, studied theology, history and musicology at the University of Rostock. in Tübingen, Göttingen, Freiburg im Breisgau and Berlin. He was promoted to Ph.D. in 1943 in Göttingen with a dissertation about Die innere Einheit von Bachs Werk.

He was a member of the group preparing the Evangelisches Kirchengesangbuch from 1939 to 1949. He was director of the Kirchenmusikschule of the Evangelische Kirche von Kurhessen-Waldeck in Schlüchtern from its foundation in 1947 to his retirement in 1968. He was from 1941 to 1981 editor (Schriftleiter) of the magazine Musik und Kirche (Music and church. He founded in 1976, together with Renate Steiger, the Internationale Arbeitsgemeinschaft für theologische Bachforschung In 1962, he was awarded an honorary doctorate of the University of Marburg. He died in Schlüchtern.

An award of the Protestant Church is named after him.

== Publications ==
- Kirche und Musik. Gesammelte Aufsätze zur Geschichte der gottesdienstlichen Musik, ed. Erich Hübner and Renate Steiger. Göttingen 1979.
- Das Weihnachts-Oratorium von Johann Sebastian Bach Bärenreiter 1999
- Einführung in Bachs H-moll-Messe, mit vollständigem Text Bärenreiter 1957

== Sources ==
- Nachlass Blankenburgs in University archive of Augsburg
- Hymnologische Sammlung Blankenburgs in the library of the University of Augsburg

== Literature ==
- Gerard Kappner: Walter Blankenburg †. in: Quatember 1986, S. 124–125
- Renate Steiger: Walter Blankenburg. In: Musik und Kirche 3/1986
- Franz Ganslandt: Jugendmusikbewegung und kirchenmusikalische Erneuerung. Impulse, Einflüsse, Wirkungen dargestellt in Verbindung mit Leben und Werk Walter Blankenburgs, Munich 1997. ISBN 3-921946-35-2
- 100. Geburtstag von Walter Blankenburg am 31. Juli 2003, in: Quintett. Kirchenmusikalische Mitteilungen aus der Evangelischen Kirche von Kurhessen-Waldeck 5/2003, pp. 8–9.
