= Horst-Eberhard Richter =

German psychoanalyst

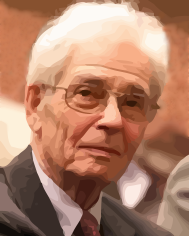
Horst-Eberhard Richter (2007)

Horst-Eberhard Richter (28 April 1923 – 19 December 2011) was a German psychoanalyst, psychosomatist and social philosopher. The author of numerous books was also regarded by many as the große alte Mann of the Federal German Peace movement.

== Life ==
Horst-Eberhard Richter was born in Berlin as the only child of the engineer Otto Richter and his wife Charlotte and grew up as an only child. He describes his mother as a very emotional woman who clung strongly to him. His father was a successful engineer, head of a Siemens plant and author of a standard reference book on precision mechanics. Richter himself experienced his father as a quiet, introverted brooding man. Richter was a member of the Hitler Youth and the Reich Labour Service.

After his school-leaving examination in 1941, Horst-Eberhard Richter was drafted into the Wehrmacht. In 1942, he served as a gunner in an Artillery Troop of the Wehrmacht and Waffen-SS on the Eastern front. In 1943, he was able to transfer to the medical corps. In 1945, he was deployed in the Italian campaign, where he deserted shortly before the end of the war and hid in a refuge in the Alps. There, French occupation soldiers tracked him down and suspected him of being a Nazi Freischar in hiding, a so-called Werwolf and held him for four months in an old Innsbruck prison until a French court-martial released him. After returning home to Germany, he learned that his parents had been murdered by Soviet soldiers months after the end of the war.

In 1946, Richter met Bergrun Luckow, who was married and pregnant at the time. After their divorce, Richter and Luckow married a year later. After Luckow's first husband agreed, Richter adopted the daughter and they had another son and daughter.

Richter studied medicine, philosophy and psychology in Berlin. He wrote his dissertation on the subject of Die philosophische Dimension des Schmerzes in the flat of a bombed-out tenement building in Berlin-Halensee, with which he was awarded a Dr. phil. in 1949. With a scientific thesis, which he wrote in the course of his further medical training, he obtained the doctorate in medicine in 1957.

From 1952 to 1962, Richter ran a counselling and research centre for mentally disturbed children and adolescents in Berlin. In addition, he trained as a psychoanalyst and as a specialist in neurology and psychiatry. From 1959 to 1962, he directed the Berlin Psychoanalytic Institute. In 1962, he was appointed to the newly established chair of psychosomatics at the University of Giessen, where he built up a three-part interdisciplinary centre with a psychosomatic clinic and departments of medical psychology and medical sociology, of which he became director. In addition, he founded a psychoanalytic institute at the site. From 1964 to 1968, Richter was chairman of the German Psychoanalytic Association. In 1971, he endorsed as an expert witness the Socialist Patients' Collective founded by Wolfgang Huber. He retired in 1991. In 2004, he held a visiting scholarship at the University of Vienna endowed by Peter Ustinov. From 1992 to 2002, he directed the Sigmund Freud Institute in Frankfurt.

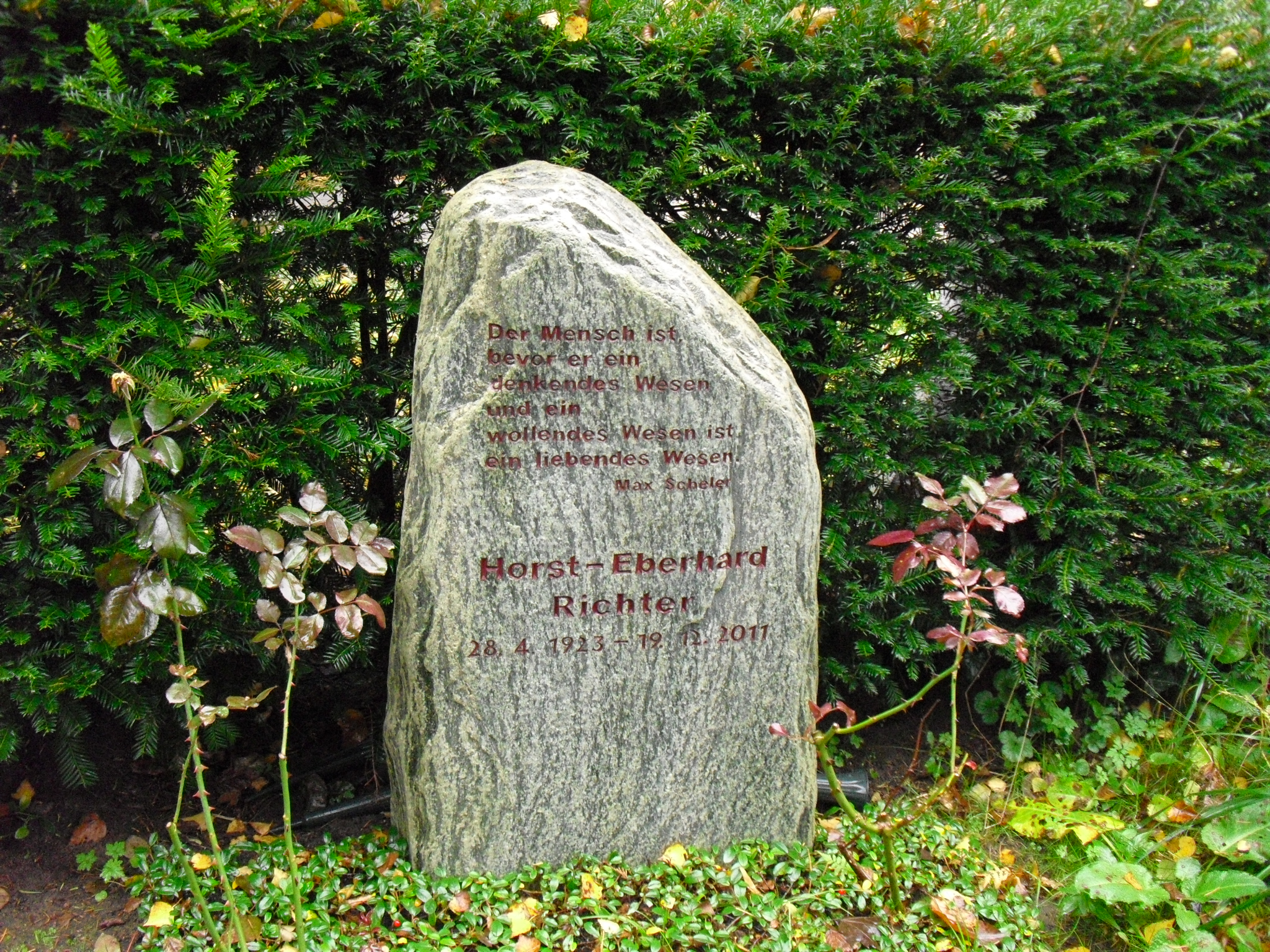
Gravesite at the Friedhof Heerstraße in Berlin-Westend with a quote from Max Scheler

Richter died on 19 December 2011 in Giessen at the age of 88 after a short illness. The funeral took place on 23 December 2011 at the state-owned Friedhof Heerstraße in Berlin Westend (grave location: 16-C-57). Spouse Bergrun Richter née Luckow (b. 1923) was buried at his side in August 2019. As a gravestone serves a boulder with a quotation by Max Scheler, which was already to be read in simplified form in the family's funeral announcement: "Man, before he is a thinking and a willing being, is a loving being."

== Work ==
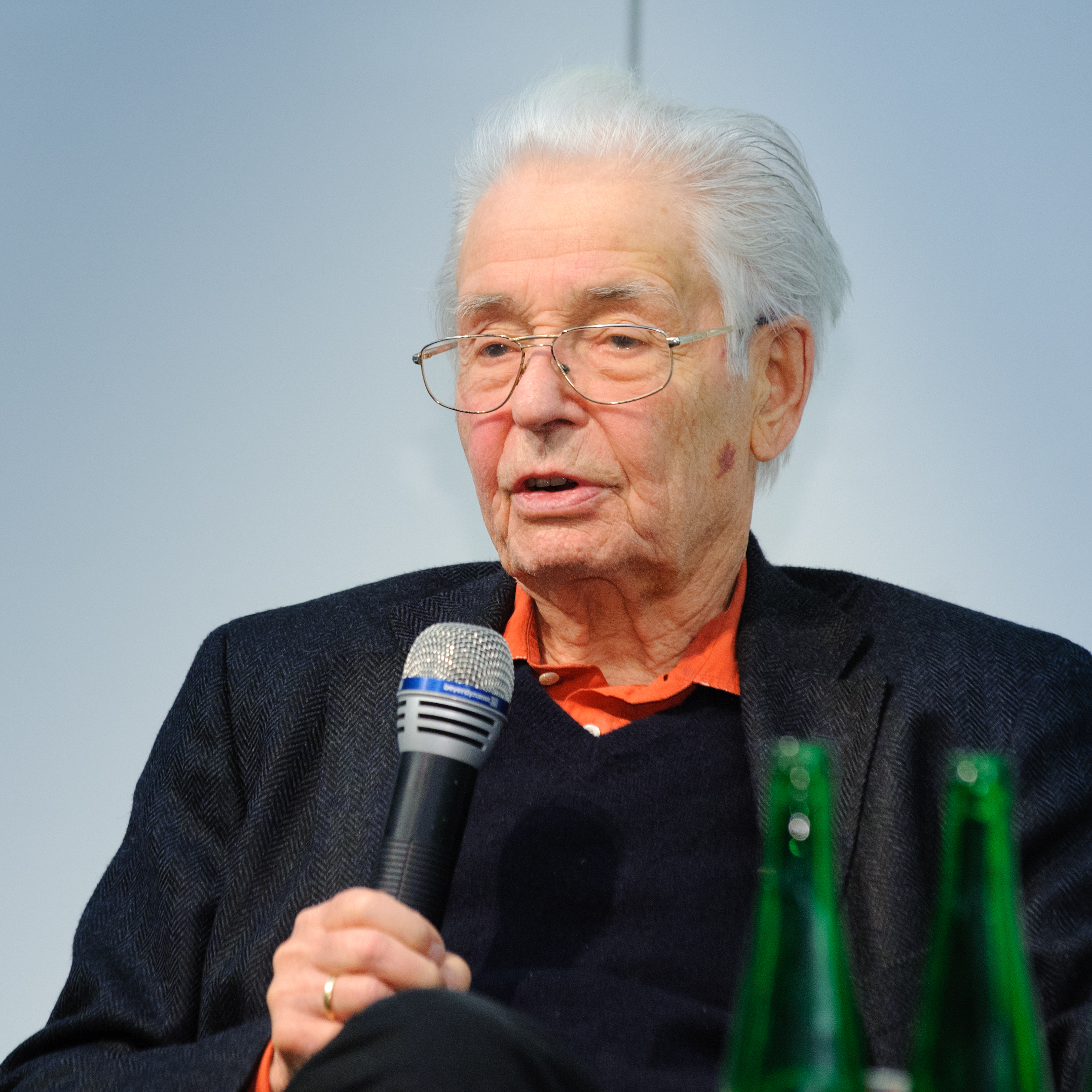
Horst-Eberhard Richter (2010)

Richter first became internationally known as one of the pioneers of psychoanalytic family research and family therapy. Complementing Freud's analysis of the parent-child relationship, he conversely investigated the pathogenic effect of disturbed parents on their children. In joint research work with Dieter Beckmann he wrote a textbook on cardiac neurosis and, together with Elmar Brähler, developed the Gießen-Test. Richter "discovered the emancipatory potential of the group, both in psychotherapeutic and political terms."

After critical analyses of the new social movements of the 1970s, his cultural-philosophical work Der Gotteskomplex appeared: Man wants to replace the loss of faith security with a will to rule based on natural science - being God instead of having God. In the vacillation between fear of impotence and delusion of omnipotence, the scientific-technical revolution threatens to lose ethical control.

In 1981, Richter's book Alle redeten vom Frieden became one of the leading figures of the peace movement and in 1982 co-founded the West German section of the International Physicians for the Prevention of Nuclear War, which received the Nobel Peace Prize in 1985 for its commitment. In 1987, Richter co-initiated the International Foundation for the Survival and the Development of Humanity, supervised by Mikhail Gorbachev. There, he led a comparative study to improve understanding between German and Russian students. From 1991 to 2001, Richter moderated the East-West Symposium on Political Self-Reflection with leaders from politics, science, literature and the church from the old and new federal States. During both Iraq wars, he was one of the most respected intellectuals of the peace movement. What Carl Friedrich von Weizsäcker called the "mental illness of peacelessness" in the West has been the main topic of Richter's cultural psychology analyses in speeches and writings since 2007.

There is a circular interrelation between doing and recognising. If one does not do what one has recognised as necessary, even if it involves personal inconvenience, then at some point one can no longer recognise what needs to be done. Those who tactically give in to the pressure to adapt, knowing full well that they could and should resist them at a reasonable risk, will gradually no longer even perceive the unreasonableness of demands to adapt, e.g. they will no longer see through their own compliance as an escape reaction. Everything appears normal: the conditions to which he surrenders and the renunciation of resistance, which he no longer experiences.

— Horst-Eberhard Richter, Psychoanalyse und Politik, foreword

Richter drafted a Frankfurt Declaration, which was intended to make it possible for doctors to publicly declare by signature "to refuse any training and further education in war medicine." Since 2001, i.e. from the very beginning, he was committed to the "globalisation-critical Attac movement".

In his opening speech at the founding congress of the German organisation in 2001 in Berlin, he strongly pleaded for a closer connection of social, economic and ecological reform initiatives with the peace movement.

— N.N., Süddeutsche Zeitung

== Horst Eberhard-Richter Institut ==
In September 2017, the Psychoanalytic Institute Giessen was renamed the Horst Eberhard Richter Institute for Psychoanalysis and Psychotherapy. Richter was a founding member of this institute in the early 1960s. The laudatory speech at the ceremony to mark the renaming was given by Hans-Jürgen Wirth. Stephan Scholz reported on Richter's tribute in the Gießener Anzeiger and called him a "thinker who dominated the bestseller lists for years and whose humanity is still praised in the highest terms today."

== Awards ==
- 1970: Forschungspreis der Schweizer Gesellschaft für Psychosomatische Medizin
- 1980: Theodor-Heuss-Preis, für seine maßgebliche Beteiligung an der Reform der deutschen Psychiatrie und Sozialpsychiatrie
- 1985: wurde International Physicians for the Prevention of Nuclear War, deren Ehrenvorsitzender er war, mit dem Friedensnobelpreis ausgezeichnet.
- 1990: "Bornheimer" as pädagogischer Ehrenpreis der Stadt Bornheim (Rheinland).
- 1993: Urania-Medaille for "herausragende Wissenschaftler".
- 2000: the Jewish National Fund planted ten trees in Israel for his life's work.
- 2001: Deutscher Fairness Preis. Die Laudatio hielt Dorothee Sölle.
- 2002: Goethe Plaque of the City of Frankfurt, for his "consistently pacifist stance", with which he had established himself as a "cautionary and widely recognised authority".
- 2003: Gandhi-Luther King-Ikeda Award of the Morehouse College, Atlanta, US.
- 2007: Medal of Honour of the Faculty of Medicine of the University of Gießen, in recognition of his life's work
- 2007: Honorary citizenship of the university town Gießen.
- 2008: Paracelsus-Medaille, for outstanding services to the German health care system and the medical profession.
- 2010: Marburger Leuchtfeuer für soziale Bürgerrechte, Awarded by Egon Vaupel, Lord Mayor of the City of Marburg and the Humanist Union.

Richter refused three times the Order of Merit of the Federal Republic of Germany on the grounds that "too many Altnazis" had received it.

== Publications ==
1960–1969

- Eltern, Kind und Neurose. Die Rolle des Kindes in der Familie/Psychoanalyse der kindlichen Rolle, new edition 1962 Rowohlt Verlag, ISBN 3-499-16082-X.
- with Dieter Beckmann: Herzneurose. Thieme, 1969. New edition Psychosozial-Verlag 1998, ISBN 3-89806-226-0.

1970–1979

- Patient Familie. Entstehung, Struktur und Therapie von Konflikten in Ehe und Familie. 1970. New edition Rowohlt 2001, ISBN 3-499-16772-7.
- with Dieter Beckmann: Der Gießen-Test (GT). 1972. 4th edition 1991, ISBN 3-456-82041-0.
- Die Gruppe. Hoffnung auf einen neuen Weg, sich selbst und andere zu befreien; Psychoanalyse in Kooperation mit Gruppeninitiativen. 1972. New edition Psychosozial-Verlag 1995, ISBN 3-930096-37-4.
- Lernziel Solidarität, 1974. New edition Psychosozial-Verlag 1998, ISBN 3-932133-34-X.
- Flüchten oder Standhalten. 1976. 3rd Edition. Psychosozial-Verlag 2001, ISBN 3-89806-128-0. (No. 1 in the Spiegel bestseller list from 19 April to 10 October 1976)
- with Hans Strotzka und Jürg Willi: Familie und seelische Krankheit. Rowohlt, 1976, ISBN 3-498-05681-6.
- Der Gotteskomplex. 1979. New edition Psychosozial-Verlag 2005, ISBN 3-89806-389-5.

1980–1989

- Alle redeten vom Frieden. Versuch einer paradoxen Intervention. Rowohlt, Reinbek 1984, ISBN 3-499-17846-X.
- Zur Psychologie des Friedens. Rowohlt, Reinbek 1984, ISBN 3-499-17869-9.
- Die Chance des Gewissens. Erinnerungen und Assoziationen. 1986. Neuauflage Psychosozial-Verlag 2002, ISBN 3-89806-177-9.
- Die hohe Kunst der Korruption. Erkenntnisse eines Politik-Beraters. 1989, Heyne-Sachbuch 158 ISBN 3-453-05104-1.

1990–1999

- Umgang mit Angst. 1992. New edition Econ 2000, ISBN 3-612-26683-7.
- Wer nicht leiden will, muss hassen. Zur Epidemie der Gewalt. 1993. New edition Psychosozial-Verlag 2004, ISBN 3-89806-277-5.
- Bedenken gegen Anpassung. Psychoanalyse und Politik. 1995. 2003 newly published under the title Psychoanalyse und Politik. Psychosozial-Verlag, ISBN 3-89806-243-0.
- Erinnerungsarbeit und das Menschenbild in der Psychotherapie. 1995. Lindauer text to the Lindauer Psychotherapiewochen, pp. 121–135 Springer-Verlag 1996 (PDF)
- Versuche, die Geschichte der RAF zu verstehen. Das Beispiel Birgit Hogefeld. Psychosozial-Verlag, 1996, ISBN 3-930096-87-0.
- Als Einstein nicht mehr weiterwußte 1997. New edition Econ 2000, ISBN 3-548-75015-X.

2000–2009

- Wanderer zwischen den Fronten. Gedanken und Erinnerungen. (Autobiographie) Kiepenheuer und Witsch, 2000. Ullstein Verlag, Munich 2001, ISBN 3-548-36287-7.
- Kultur des Friedens. Psychosozial-Verlag, Gießen 2001, ISBN 3-89806-068-3.
- Das Ende der Egomanie. Die Krise des westlichen Bewusstseins. 2002, ISBN 3-462-03087-6 (as Taschenbuch: Knaur 77655, Munich 2003, ISBN 3-426-77655-3).
- with Bernard Cassen and Susan George: Eine andere Welt ist möglich! [Dokumentation des Attac-Kongresses vom 19.–21. Oktober 2001 in Berlin]. VSA, Hamburg 2002, ISBN 3-87975-845-X.
- with Frank Uhe: Aufstehen für die Menschlichkeit. Psychosozial-Verlag, Gießen 2003, ISBN 3-89806-283-X.
- Ist eine andere Welt möglich? Für eine solidarische Globalisierung. Kiepenheuer und Witsch, Cologne 2003 ISBN 3-462-03253-4 (KiWi 774, unchanged new edition: Psychosozial-Verlag, Gießen 2005, ISBN 3-89806-346-1).
- Die Krise der Männlichkeit in der unerwachsenen Gesellschaft. Psychosozial-Verlag, Gießen 2006, ISBN 978-3-89806-570-2.
- Die seelische Krankheit Friedlosigkeit ist heilbar Psychosozial-Verlag, Gießen 2008, ISBN 978-3-89806-836-9.

2010–2011

- Moral in Zeiten der Krise. Suhrkamp, Frankfurt 2010, ISBN 978-3-518-46231-7

== Other publications ==
- Vorwort zu: Christiane F.: Wir Kinder vom Bahnhof Zoo. Written down from tape transcripts by Kai Hermann and Horst Rieck. Gruner & Jahr, Hamburg 1978
- Niederlage des Intellekts. In: Freitag. Die Ost-West-Wochenzeitung. Nr. 31 from 23 July 2004 (Online)

== Film ==
- Horst-Eberhard Richter, Psychoanalytiker. Dokumentarfilm, Deutschland, 2007, 43:30 Min., Buch und Regie: Wolfgang Schoen und Torsten Halsey, Produktion: tvschoenfilm, SWR, Arte, First broadcast: 3 March 2008 on Arte.
