= Wer bin ich – und wenn ja, wie viele? =

2007 non-fiction book by Richard David Precht

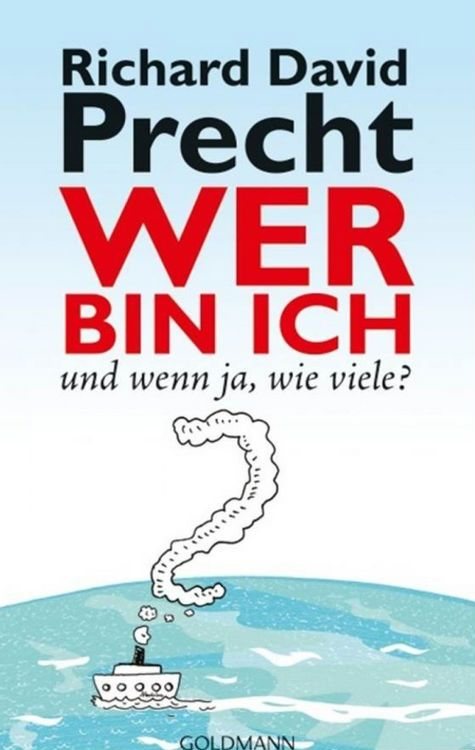
- German cover art by Oliver Weiss
- Author: Richard David Precht
- Language: German
- Publisher: Goldmann Verlag
- Publication date: 17 September 2007
- Publication place: Germany
- Media type: Print
- Pages: 400
- ISBN: 978-3-442-31143-9

Wer bin ich – und wenn ja, wie viele? is a non-fiction book written by German philosopher and author Richard David Precht and published in 2007. In 2008, it ranked number 1 on the bestseller list by Spiegel for 16 weeks. In April 2011, the English translation Who Am I? And If So, How Many? was released.

The subject of Precht's investigation, which is aimed at general understanding, is the discussion of fundamental philosophical questions about human consciousness and behavior, taking into account more recent psychological and neurobiological findings. The declared aim of the book is to awaken and train the desire to think and to encourage progressive self-knowledge and a more consciously led life.

== Content ==
The book is divided into three main questions, following Immanuel Kant, under which a total of 34 chapters are elaborated:

- Was kann ich wissen? (What can I know?) which is dealt with in nine chapters.
- Was soll ich tun? (What should I do?) which is dealt with in 16 chapters.
- Was darf ich hoffen? (What can I hope for?) which again is dealt with in nine chapters.

== Reception ==
Bernd Berke rated the work in the Westfälische Rundschau as a „Philosophiebuch, wie man es sich schon lange gewünscht [habe]" ("philosophy book as one has long [wanted it to be]"). Precht includes „Charles Darwins Evolutionslehre, Sigmund Freuds Psychoanalyse, physikalische Fakten und vor allem neueste Ergebnisse der Hirnforschung" ("Charles Darwin's theory of evolution, Sigmund Freud's psychoanalysis, physical facts and above all the latest results from brain research") in his considerations.

Michael Springer sums it up in German scientific magazine Spektrum der Wissenschaft: „Ein Buch über Philosophie, das man gut gelaunt zuklappt wie nach einem Abend mit vielseitig interessierten und darum interessanten Gästen" ("A book about philosophy that you close in a good mood, like after an evening with guests who are very interested and therefore interesting").

Gustav Falke criticized the book in the Frankfurter Allgemeine Zeitung (FAZ) for not learning anything by reading.

=== Success ===
From February 2008 to October 2012, the book was on Spiegel's bestseller list. Till 2013, more than 1 million book units were sold in 32 different languages. According to German magazine Buchreport, Wer bin ich – und wenn ja, wie viele? was the most successful hardcover non-fiction book of 2008 and ranks #3 of the Spiegel bestsellers of the decade 2000 to 2010.

== Editions ==
- Wer bin ich – und wenn ja wie viele? Eine philosophische Reise. Goldmann Verlag, 2007, ISBN 3-442-31143-8.
