= Anna, die Schule und der liebe Gott =

2013 non-fiction book by Richard David Precht

Anna, die Schule und der liebe Gott: Der Verrat des Bildungssystems an unseren Kindern
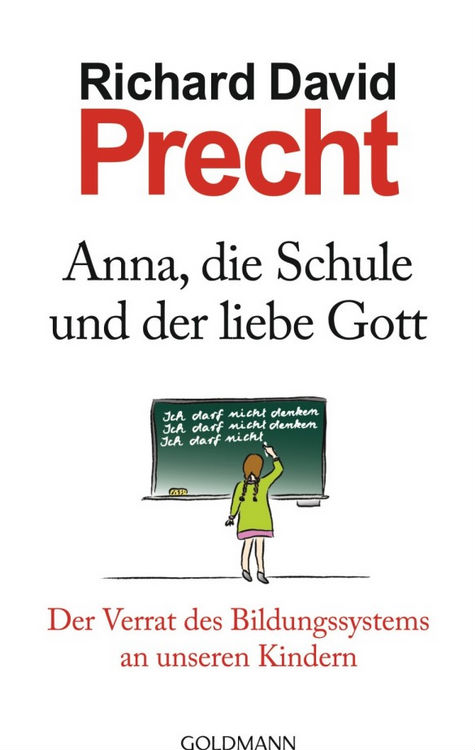
- Author: Richard David Precht
- Language: German
- Publisher: Goldmann Verlag
- Publication date: April 22, 2013
- Publication place: Germany
- Media type: Print
- Pages: 352
- ISBN: 978-3-442-31261-0

Anna, die Schule und der liebe Gott: Der Verrat des Bildungssystems an unseren Kindern (Anna, the school and the good Lord: The education system's betrayal of our children) is a non-fiction book written by German philosopher and author Richard David Precht and published in 2013 by Goldmann Verlag.

In the book, Precht calls for a "Bildungsrevolution" ("educational revolution") for the German school system, among other things with a new version of the role of teachers and teacher training as well as with the targeted promotion of intrinsic learning motivation of students while eliminating the conventional grading system. In connection with the individualization of teaching and learning processes in cross-year projects and in all-day school operations, Precht would also move away from the scheme of subject-specific 45-minute lessons. The book received a predominantly critical reception in the media.

== Overview ==
=== Structure ===
The two main parts of the book follow on from the introduction under the heading Anna, the School and the good Lord.

The first main part under the title Die Bildungskatastrophe (The Education Catastrophe) consists of five sub-chapters:

1. Was ist Bildung? (What is education?); 2. Klassenkampf in der Schule (class struggle in school); 3. PISA, G8 und andere Dummheiten (PISA, G8 and other stupid things); 4. Das Dilemma unserer Schule (The dilemma of our schools); 5. Lehrer als Beruf (Teacher as a profession).

The second main part, entitled Die Bildungsrevolution (The Educational Revolution), contains six subsections: 1. Bildung im 21. Jahrhundert (Education in the 21st century); 2. Wie geht das Lernen? (How does learning work?); 3. Individualisiertes Lernen (Individualized learning); 4. Jenseits von Fach und Note (Beyond subject and grade); 5. Bessere Schulen (Better schools); 6. Bildung für alle! (Education for everyone!).

=== Content ===
Richard David Precht writes that Germany has, according to OECD studies, "eines der schlechtesten Schul- und Bildungssysteme unter allen Industrienationen der Welt" ("one of the worst school and education systems among all industrial nations in the world").

Precht calls ten principles of a holistic modification for a contemporary school system in his book:

1. The child's intrinsic motivation is to be given priority.
2. Individual learning should be made possible and supported according to one's own talent and learning pace.
3. Not just learning material, but the understanding of the meaning and sensuality of things and the context of this world is to be conveyed, primarily in projects.
4. The bond of the individual in the community should be considered as an important learning factor.
5. The organization of school operations should promote a culture of relationships and responsibility, for example by subdividing the operation into various “learning houses”.
6. Values and appreciation for one's own learning environment are to be promoted through rituals, among other things.
7. A learner-friendly school architecture with a campus as the center can and should contribute to a positive school and learning climate.
8. The ability to concentrate must be trained and maintained throughout school.
9. A personal evaluation with the help of monitoring related to the individuality of the child is intended to replace the conventional number system.
10. The all-day school enables educational equality in that all learning relevant for the school takes place in the school (and not also with homework or in extracurricular tutoring).

== Reception ==
Peter Praschl from German newspaper Die Welt described the book as "sinnlos, überflüssig, ein 352 Seiten langes Ärgernis" ("pointless, superfluous, a 352 page long annoyance"), criticizing that Precht's diagnosis is true, but nothing about it is original.

Katja Weise from Norddeutscher Rundfunk (NDR) praised the book for its ideas.

Jürgen Kaube from the Frankfurter Allgemeine Zeitung (FAZ) criticized the book for the fact that almost all of his theses have long been established and the very few arguments for his statements.

According to Oberhessische Presse, the book is a "realitätsferne Vision eines selbsternannten Heilsbringers, der mit Modebegriffen und Medienhype Altbekanntes als Sensation verkauft" ( "unrealistic vision of a self-proclaimed savior who sells well-known things as a sensation with fashion and media hype").

Uwe Wittstock from Focus praised the book in their special format "Die besten Bücher 2013" ("The best books 2013").

== Editions ==
- Anna, die Schule und der liebe Gott: Der Verrat des Bildungssystems an unseren Kindern. Goldmann Verlag (2013). ISBN 3-8445-0983-6
