= Evangelical Working Group of the CDU/CSU =

German specialized agency of the CDU and CSU

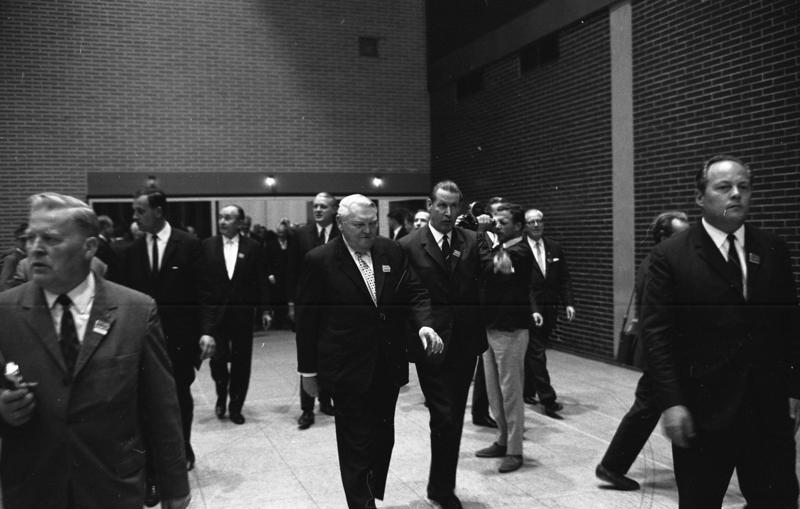
The Evangelical Working Group in Bochum, 1966

The Evangelical Working Group of the CDU/CSU (Evangelischer Arbeitskreis der CDU/CSU) (EAK) is a specialized agency of the CDU and CSU. The term evangelical is not to be confused with a more conservative or radical connotation in the English language, but refers to the Evangelische Kirche in Deutschland, the general union of mostly Lutheran and mainstream regional churches.

The CDU/CSU was originally dominated by Catholics. The EAK was established in order to secure the position of the Protestant members. It also facilitates dialogue with the Protestant churches within Germany. Since the 1960s, the importance of the EAK has declined along with the declining importance of the religious divide between Catholics and Protestants in Germany.

== Objectives ==
Within the CDU/CSU there is a structural dominance of Catholic members. During the early years of the Federal Republic of Germany denominational differences played an important role. Therefore, the EAK was created to serve three main objectives: firstly, the Evangelical Union politicians wanted to appeal Protestant voters and improve the electoral chances of the party amongst those voters. Thus the EAK served to express the interdenominational character of the CDU/CSU to the voting public. On the other hand, the maintenance of sectarian proportional representation has been pursued within the CDU/CSU parties. In addition, the organization also served to provide Protestants a level of self-assurance within a predominantly Catholic environment. Today, the EAK sees its role as facilitating contact with and providing forum for the Protestant churches and their members.

== History ==
The EAK was founded in 1952 at the instigation of Hermann Ehlers in Siegen. The actual trigger for the formation of the EAK was the dispute between Konrad Adenauer and Gustav Heinemann, a leading Protestant-evangelical member of the Christian-democrats (CDU) at that time, on the issue of rearmament. Heinemann, who opposed the rearmament of (western) Germany for religious and conscience reasons, had resigned as interior minister, and finally formed the All-German People's Party (Gesamtdeutsche Volkspartei, (GVP)) which was seen as a serious challenge to the CDU. Heinemann was also provost of the Synod of the Evangelical Church in Germany (EKD), and thus one of the leading Protestant representatives in Germany. This alarmed the Protestant Union politicians.

The failure of the Gesamtdeutschen Volkspartei in the general election in 1953 was seen by the CDU as a success of the newly formed EAK. At the time, Gerhard Schroeder, chairman of the EAK, widely received attention and was considered a potential successor to Adenauer. With the increasing secularization since the late 1960s there was a change in the character of the EAK and there was a relative decline in importance of the organization.

== Hermann-Ehlers medal ==
Since 2004, the EAK has presented the Hermann-Ehlers medal to figures from the evangelical church and politics.

- 2004 Wolfgang Schäuble
- 2007 Wolfgang Huber
- 2010 Richard von Weizsäcker

== Chairpersons ==
- 1952-1954 Hermann Ehlers
- 1954-1955 Robert Tillmanns
- 1955-1978 Gerhard Schröder
- 1978-1983 Roman Herzog
- 1984-1990 Albert Martin
- 1990-1992 Peter Hintze
- 1992-1993 Angela Merkel
- 1993-2003 Jochen Borchert
- 2003 - Thomas Rachel
