= Gerald Hüther =

German neurobiologist and author

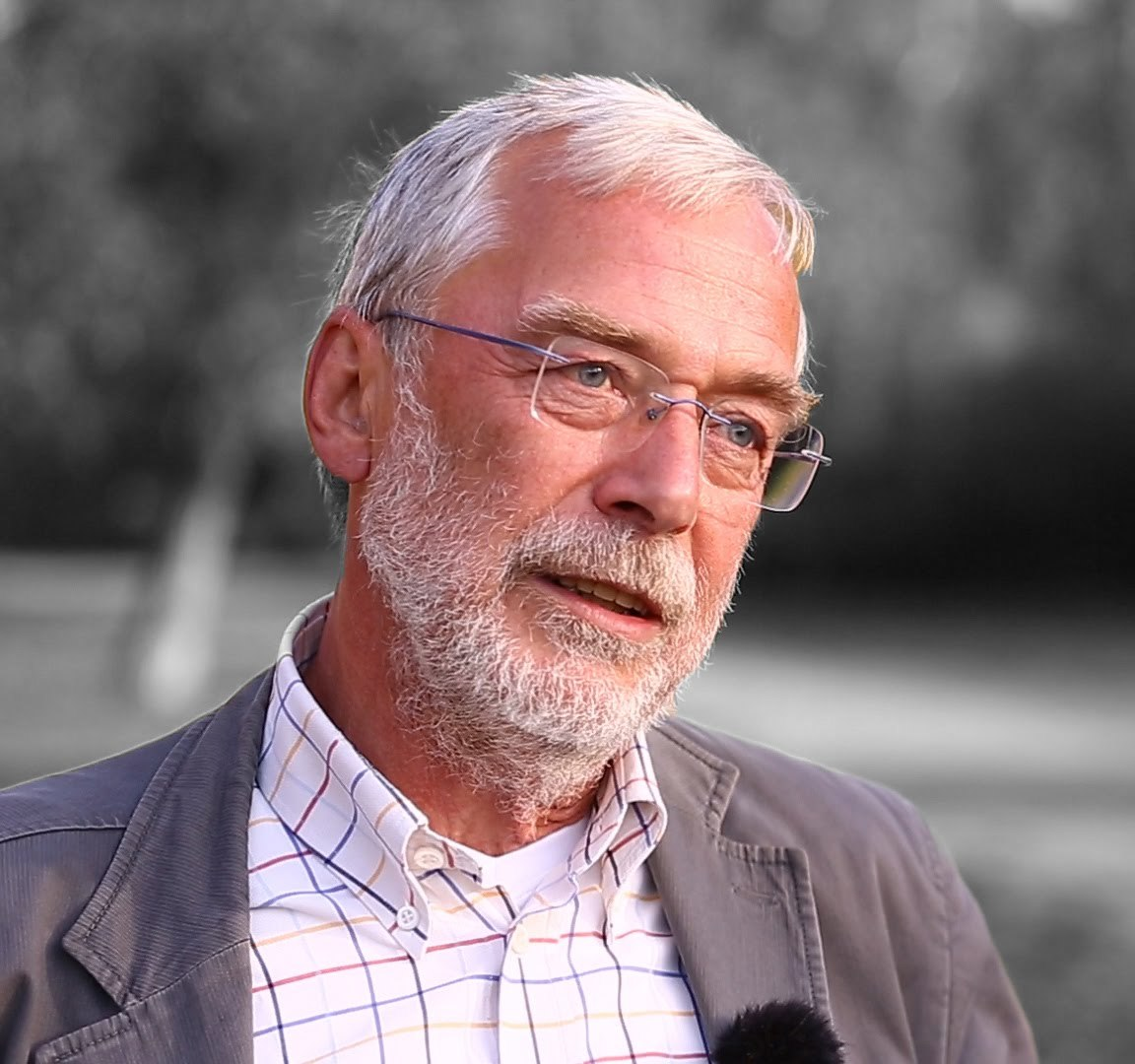
- Hüther in 2016
- Born: 15 February 1951 (age 75); Emleben, Thuringia, East Germany (now Germany)
- Education: Universität Leipzig
- Occupations: Neurobiologist; Author
- Children: 3
- Website: Personal website (in German)

Gerald Hüther (born 15 February 1951 in Emleben) is a German neurobiologist and author of popular science books and other writings.

He often gives talks to share his findings from neurobiology at conferences like TED, but he said that he will not give many more talks during his lifetime. He also took part on talk shows like Markus Lanz and Precht.

Hüther is a co-initiator of the initiative Schule im Aufbruch (school on the move).

== Life ==
Gerald Hüther was born on 15 February 1951 in Emleben, Thuringia, East Germany (now Germany). According to his own statement, he "[...] ließ die Schule über [sich] ergehen und hoffte, dass sie bald vorbeigehen würde [...]" ("[...] he just endured school and hoped it would pass soon [...]"). He attained his Abitur in 1969 with a grade average of 1.5 and studied biology at the Universität Leipzig. In the late 1970s, he fled from East Germany because it "[...] dort viel zu eng wurde [...]" ("[...] got too tight for him there" [...]") by faking his visa. From 1979 to 1989 he conducted research in the field of brain development at the Max Planck Institute for Experimental Medicine in Göttingen. In 2016, he ended his university career. He published approximately 150 original papers. Hüther is the initiator and director of the Akademie für Potenzialentfaltung (Academy for developing potential). He was also an author and member of the advisory board of the German online magazine Rubikon, but left it on May 11, 2021.

Hüther has two daughters and a son.

== Views ==
=== School system ===
Hüther is a sharp critic of the current school system in Germany, thinking the schools there treat children like objects. He is of the opinion that schools in Germany are deliberately so bad that they produce immature voters and thus the needs of as many people as possible are disregarded, whereby they seek as many substitute satisfactions as possible, „[...] damit wir genügend Kunden für den Müll haben, den wir hier ihnen andrehen wollen [...]“ ("[...] so that we have enough customers for the rubbish that we want to sell them here [...]"). He thinks that schools in their current state are largely a waste of money because they are too inefficient.

=== Schulpflicht ===
Hüther is against the Schulpflicht (a German law forcing young people to go to a school) because it is „[...] das Furchtbarste, das einem überhaupt passieren kann [...]“ ("[...] the most terrible thing that can ever happen to you [...]" if you ask young people why they go to school and their only answer is „Weil ich muss“ ("Because I have to"). He thinks that children inherently want to learn and supported the 2019 feature film CaRabA #LebenohneSchule, initiated by Bertrand Stern, which introduces unschooled, free-educated people.

=== Universal basic income ===
Hüther is an advocate of the universal basic income (UBI). He also thinks that there will be a basic income in the near future because many employees will be replaced by robots or machines which are cheaper, more efficient and more accurate compared to humans and do not complain in contrast to humans. He thinks that the current school system in Germany trains people for those professions that will no longer exist in the future because they are being automated.

=== Hierarchy ===
Hüther thinks that the world has become so complex that hierarchy as a form of rule has become too controlling of people, which is why strict hierarchies in social structures like companies and organizations are increasingly being dismantled.

== Reception ==
According to German magazin Manager Magazin, Hüther is „[...] der bekannteste Hirnforscher in Deutschland [...]“ ('[...] the most famous neuroscientist in Germany [...]".

== Publications (selection) ==
- With Helmut Bonney: Neues vom Zappelphilipp. ADS/ADHS verstehen, vorbeugen und behandeln. 2002; 11. Auflage. Neuausg. Walter, Mannheim 2010, ISBN 978-3-530-50635-8.
- With Yvonne Brandl, Marianne Leuzinger-Bohleber (publishee): ADHS – Frühprävention statt Medikalisierung. Theorie, Forschung, Kontroversen. Vandenhoeck & Ruprecht, Göttingen 2006. (Schriften des Sigmund-Freud-Instituts: Reihe 2, Psychoanalyse im interdisziplinären Dialog; Bd. 4) ISBN 3-525-45178-4.
- Bedienungsanleitung für ein menschliches Gehirn. Vandenhoeck & Ruprecht, Göttingen 2006, ISBN 3-525-01464-3.
- Die Evolution der Liebe. Was Darwin bereits ahnte und die Darwinisten nicht wahrhaben wollen. 5. Auflage. Vandenhoeck & Ruprecht, Göttingen 2007, ISBN 978-3-525-01452-3.
- Männer. Das schwache Geschlecht und sein Gehirn. Vandenhoeck & Ruprecht, Göttingen 2009, ISBN 978-3-525-40420-1.
- With Inge Krens: Das Geheimnis der ersten neun Monate. Unsere frühesten Prägungen. Neuaufl. Beltz, Weinheim 2010, ISBN 978-3-407-22907-6.
- Die Macht der inneren Bilder. Wie Visionen das Gehirn, den Menschen und die Welt verändern. 6., unveränd. Aufl. Vandenhoeck & Ruprecht, Göttingen 2010, ISBN 978-3-525-46213-3.
- Biologie der Angst. Wie aus Stress Gefühle werden. 10. Auflage. Vandenhoeck & Ruprecht, Göttingen 2011, ISBN 978-3-525-01439-4.
- Was wir sind und was wir sein könnten: Ein neurobiologischer Mutmacher. S. Fischer, Frankfurt am Main 2011, ISBN 978-3-10-032405-4.
- With Uli Hauser: Jedes Kind ist hoch begabt: Die angeborenen Talente unserer Kinder und was wir aus ihnen machen. Knaus, München 2012, ISBN 978-3-8135-0448-4
- With Herbert Renz-Polster: Wie Kinder heute wachsen: Natur als Entwicklungsraum. Ein neuer Blick auf das kindliche Lernen, Denken und Fühlen. Beltz, Weinheim/Basel 2013, ISBN 978-3-407-85953-2.
- Kommunale Intelligenz. edition Körber-Stiftung, Hamburg 2013, ISBN 978-3-89684-098-1.
- So wie bisher kann es nicht weitergehen! In: Matthias Eckoldt: Kann das Gehirn das Gehirn verstehen? 2. Auflage. Carl-Auer-Verlag, Heidelberg 2014, ISBN 978-3-8497-0002-7.
- With Peter M. Endres: Lernlust. Worauf es im Leben wirklich ankommt. Murmann Verlag, Hamburg 2014, ISBN 978-3-86774-290-0.
- With Christoph Quarch: Rettet das Spiel! Weil leben mehr als funktionieren ist. Hanser Verlag, München 2016, ISBN 978-3-446-44701-1.
- Etwas mehr Hirn, bitte: Eine Einladung zur Wiederentdeckung der Freude am eigenen Denken und der Lust am gemeinsamen Gestalten. Vandenhoeck & Ruprecht Verlag, Göttingen 2016, ISBN 978-3-525-40464-5.
- Raus aus der Demenz-Falle! Wie es gelingen kann, die Selbstheilungskräfte des Gehirns rechtzeitig zu aktivieren. Arkana Verlag, München 2017, ISBN 978-3-641-20242-2.
- Würde: Was uns stark macht – als Einzelne und als Gesellschaft. Knaus 2018, ISBN 978-3-8135-0783-6.
- With Sven Ole Müller, Nicole Bauer: Wie Träume wahr werden. Das Geheimnis der Potential-Entfaltung. Wilhelm Goldmann Verlag, München 2018, ISBN 978-3-446-44701-1|ISBN 978-3-442-31481-2.

DVD:

- Die vergebliche Suche der Hirnforscher nach dem Ort, an dem sie Seele wohnt, Auditorium-Netzwerk, 2008.

Online ressource:

- Selection of talks by Gerald Hüther, as a part of the Lindauer Psychotherapiewochen (PDF)

== Literature ==
- Gerald Hüther. In: Kürschners Deutscher Gelehrten-Kalender 2003. 19. Ausgabe. Band I: A – J. Bio-bibliographisches Verzeichnis deutschsprachiger Wissenschaftler der Gegenwart. K. G. Saur, München 2003, ISBN 3-598-23607-7, S. 1422.
- Roger von Wartburg: Im Zeitalter der Scharlatane. Hüther, Precht, Fratton & Co. bei Lichte besehen. In: lvb.inform (Zeitschrift des Lehrerinnen- und Lehrervereins Baselland), Heft 2013/14-02, S. 13–27 (PDF)
