= Anton Zischka =

Austrian author and journalist

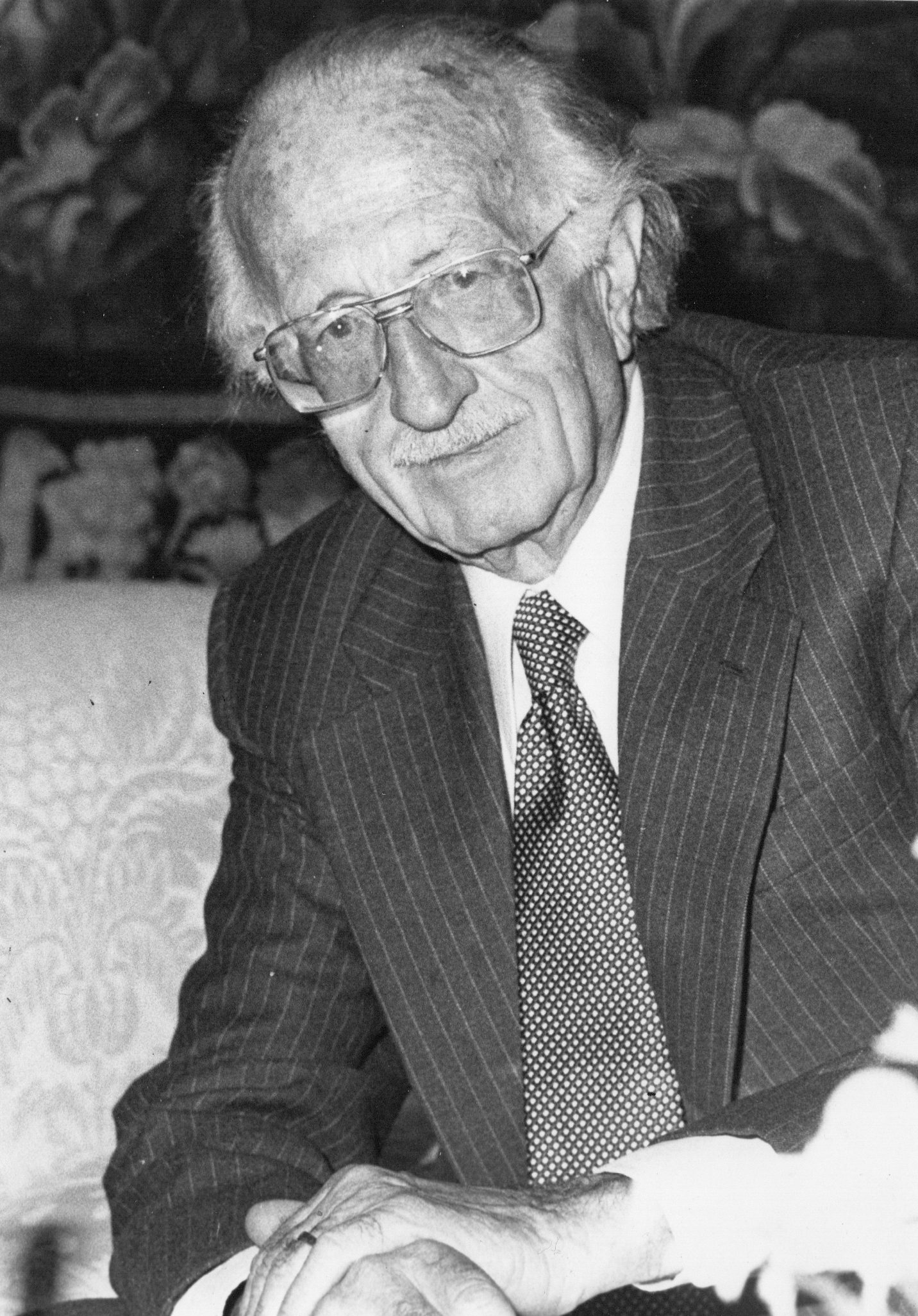
Anton Zischka

Anton Emmerich Zischka von Trochnov (born in Vienna, Austria-Hungary, September 14, 1904-died in Pollença, Spain, May 31, 1997) was an Austrian journalist and one of the most successful non-fiction writers in the 20th century. He also wrote under the pseudonyms of Rupert Donkan, Thomas Daring, Darius Plecha and Antal Sorba. He published 40 books, mostly covering non-fictional economic and technical topics, and have been translated into 18 languages.

== Life ==
Zischka studied at the Ludwig-Maximilians-Universität München. He worked for the Neue Freien Presse from 1924 to 1929 and, beginning in 1930, served as a Paris correspondent for European and American newspapers. He acquired a private aircraft, which he used for international reporting. His reports on the 1931 China floods appeared in European newspapers. Following the publication of his first book, Le Monde en Folie, in 1933, he worked as a freelance writer. From 1935 until his death in 1997, he lived with his Dutch wife on a finca in San Vicente, Mallorca. Part of his personal archive is held by Deutsches Museum Munich.

== Describing travels and industry experience ==
Start of the 1930s, Zischka reports about foreign countries and global industries (Zischka worked under cover in Belgian coal mines and Romanian oil fields) promoted connoisseurship and authenticity. He found a broad audience in Nazi Germany but as well abroad.

The growth and success of the Goldmann publishing house in Leipzig was mainly based on the success of Zischka's bestsellers which are different from, for instance, de:Karl Aloys Schenzinger, a more fictional Raw Material bestseller written during the Third Reich. Zischka remained in Spain (and staunchly adhered to non-fiction) and found international praise as well. Zischka finally found (after some vain efforts) a sponsor within the Nazi elite, Fritz Todt. The latter introduced Wissenschaft bricht Monopole (1936) as text book in secondary schools and made Zischka a household name within the regime. The book was translated in 18 languages and sold worldwide.

== Serving the Third Reich propaganda effort ==
Similar to "Ölkrieg", Zischka explained the background of war and armed conflict as simple struggles for land and raw materials. Zischka presented German technical developments as Coal fluidization or the Haber process as being able to guarantee peace. He juxtaposed the greedy capitalism of British or American monopolies against the German orderly working, organic "Volksgemeinschaft" willing to share its technology. Against an Anglo-Saxon democratic public, a society dominated by mass media and party politics Zischka put his (very German) ideal of an organic synthesis, a common Gemeinschaft based on a broad mass movement led by technocrats deciding on efficiency criteria.

Zischka served widespread then German credentials. Zischka avoided blunt antisemitism and outspoken chauvinism, which allowed him to draw a peaceful and "modern" picture of the Third Reich, serving exactly the latter's prewar propaganda aims. That eased as well Zischka's postwar stance as a nonapolitical, peaceful technocrat. However, Zischka joined the NSDAP in 1940 and was a member of Deutsche Arbeitsfront. He also trained and instructed Legion Condor forces and provided dossiers about the Spanish political situation to Nazi government authorities.

=== Impact on public debate in the Third Reich ===
Zischka's publications enhanced a public debate about measurements to increase energy autarky and lead to the construction (against the will of the German petrochemical industry) of several coal fluidization plants in Germany. In real life, those plants served not for global peace but provided gasoline for the Wehrmacht Blitzkriegs.

== Restart and further success after 1945 ==
An allied order for repatriation lead to Zischka's internment after 1945. Zischka managed to get back to writing activities with Bertelsmann (using a pseudonym first) and reestablished again a legal foothold in Spain within 1948. Further bestsellers followed, Zischka went famous as well through public lectures in Germany. His main topics stayed energy and industry, but he wrote as well about the role of the dollar in the global economy. The latter topic Zischka presented as a controversy between annotated Anglo-Saxon profiteering and war mongering against a peace power of (not longer German) but European origin.

=== Zischka as source of ideas for globalization critics ===
Zischka was also an author. He wrote on topics of upcoming broad interest (as energy supply). Writers and journalists such as Günter Wallraff and Peter Scholl-Latour have incorporated Zischka's journalistic methods, with his points and argumentations still being found in different parts of the German political spectrum and in debate.

As an example, Zischka's paradigm of dollar-imperialism and war about oil are to be found with nowadays German non-fiction authors of different origins: .

- F. William Engdahl, a Büso related journalist and author of "Mit der Ölwaffe zur Weltmacht" ("The oil weapon leading to global power")
- Hans Kronberger, former Member of the European Parliament for Austrian right wing FPÖparty, author of "Blut für Öl" (Blood for oil), the preface of the book written by SPD-Solar Guru Hermann Scheer
- Franz Alt, former member of CDU, forerunner of the Peace Movement and author of "Krieg um Öl oder Frieden durch die Sonne" ("War about oil or solar peace")

Zischka and writers associated with his views combined criticism of the United States and globalization with a technocratic approach to armed conflict. Their accounts gave limited attention to local social struggles and cultural or religious tensions. This combination did not fit readily within conventional left–right political categories. Critics also questioned whether it offered a way to address conflicts such as Kosovo.

== Selected bibliographies ==
- Anton Zischka: Der Kampf um die Weltmacht Öl, Goldmann, Leipzig 1934
- Anton Zischka: Der Kampf um die Weltmacht Baumwolle, Goldmann, Leipzig 1935
- Anton Zischka: Abessinien, "das letzte ungelöste Problem Afrikas". Goldmann, Bern, Leipzig 1935
- Anton Zischka: Japan in der Welt, 1936
- Anton Zischka: Wissenschaft bricht Monopole. Der Forscherkampf um neue Rohstoffe und neuen Lebensraum . Goldmann, Leipzig 1936
- Anton Zischka: Brot für 2 Milliarden Menschen - Der Kampf um die Nahrung der Welt, Goldmann Verlag, Leipzig 1938
- Anton Zischka: Ölkrieg, Goldmann Verlag, Leipzig 1939
- Anton Zischka: Englands Bündnisse, Goldmann Verlag, Leipzig 1940
- Anton Zischka: Sieg der Arbeit - Geschichte des fünftausendjährigen Kampfes gegen Unwissenheit und Sklaverei, Goldmann, Leipzig 1941
- Anton Zischka: Die Auferstehung Arabiens, 1942
- Anton Zischka: Die Welt bleibt reich, 1952
- Anton Zischka: Kohle im Atomzeitalter, Bertelsmann, 1961
- Anton Zischka: Das Ende des amerikanischen Jahrhunderts, 1972; Stalling, Oldenburg 1985, ISBN 3-7979-1343-5
- Anton Zischka: Kampf ums Überleben. Das Menschenrecht auf Energie, Econ, München 1979, ISBN 3-430-19964-6
- Antal Sorba: Die große Schröpfung. 5000 Jahre Wirtschaft trotz Finanzamt, Econ, München 1985, ISBN 3-430-18620-X
- Anton Zischka: Der Dollar, Glanz und Elend der Weltwährung, Langen Müller/Herbig, 1986; Akt. Neuausgabe 1995, ISBN 3-7844-7345-8
- Anton Zischka: Tschernobyl - kein Zufall. Sowjetwirtschaft und die Fehler des Westens, Universitas, München 1987, ISBN 3-8004-1138-5
- Anton Zischka: Die alles treibende Kraft. Weltgeschichte der Energie, 1988, ISBN 3-87200-667-3
