= Peter Hintze =

German politician (1950-2016)

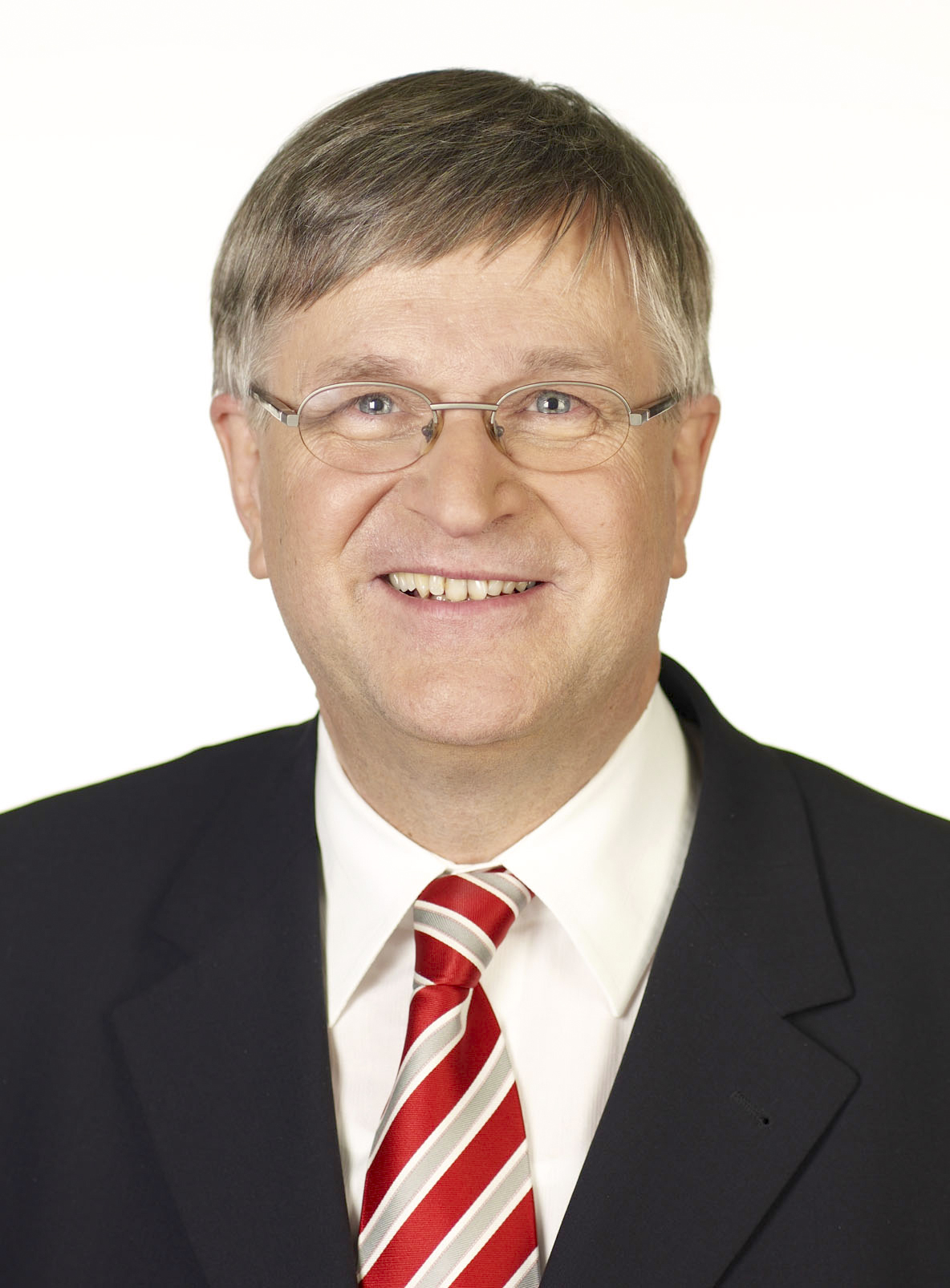

Vice President of the Bundestag (on proposal of the CDU/CSU-faction)
- In office 22 October 2013 – 26 November 2016
- President: Norbert Lammert
- Preceded by: none (second VP-post for the CSU/CSU-group was created after the 2013 election)
- Succeeded by: Michaela Noll

Member of the Bundestag
- In office 1990–2016

Personal details
- Born: 25 April 1950 Honnef, West Germany (now Germany)
- Died: 26 November 2016 (aged 66)
- Party: German: Christian Democratic Union; EU: European People's Party
- Education: University of Bonn; Kirchliche Hochschule Wuppertal/Bethel
- Profession: Parson

Peter Hintze (25 April 1950 – 26 November 2016) was a German politician of the Christian Democratic Union (CDU) who served as a member of the German Bundestag from 1990 until his death in 2016.

From 2013 until 2016, Hintze was one of the six Vice Presidents of the Bundestag. He had previously been federal chairman of the Evangelical Working Group of the CDU/CSU from 1990 to 1992 and general secretary of the CDU from 1992 to 1998. He was also Vice President of the Centrist Democrat International.

== Political career ==
Hintze served as a member of the German Bundestag from the 1990 federal election. Between 1990 and 1992, he chaired the Evangelical Working Group of the CDU/CSU.

In 1991/1992, Hintze briefly served as Parliamentary State Secretary at the Federal Ministry of Family Affairs, Senior Citizens, Women and Youth under minister Angela Merkel in the fourth cabinet of Chancellor Helmut Kohl.

During the national election campaign in 1994 Hintze was the driving force behind the Rote-Socken-Kampagne ("Red Socks Campaign"), a campaign which was directed against the left-wing PDS and the alleged possibility of a coalition between the PDS and the Social Democratic Party. It is believed that the Rote-Socken-Kampagne contributed to the electoral victory of the CDU and Chancellor Helmut Kohl.

In autumn 2005, the Bundestagswahl 2005 ended the Gerhard Schröder era; Angela Merkel became chancellor of a Union/SPD-cabinet. From 2005 to 2013, Hintze served as Parliamentary State Secretary at the Federal Ministry for Economic Affairs and Technology under ministers Michael Glos (2005–2009); Karl-Theodor zu Guttenberg (2009); Rainer Brüderle (2009–2011); and Philipp Rösler (2011–2013) in the first and second cabinets of Chancellor Angela Merkel. Between 2007 and 2013, he was also the government’s Coordinator of Aerospace Policy.

From 2006, Hintze led the Bundestag group of CDU parliamentarians from North Rhine-Westphalia, the largest delegation within the CDU/CSU parliamentary group.

In the negotiations to form a coalition government of the Christian Democrats (CDU together with the Bavarian CSU) and the Free Democratic Party (FDP) following the 2009 federal elections, Hintze was part of the CDU/CSU delegation in the working group on foreign affairs, defense and development policy, led by Franz Josef Jung (CSU) and Werner Hoyer (FDP). Later, in the negotiations to form a Grand Coalition of Merkel's Christian Democrats and the SPD following the 2013 German elections, he was part of the CDU/CSU delegation in the working group on bank regulation and the Eurozone, led by Herbert Reul and Martin Schulz.

In his capacity as vice-president, he was a member of the parliament’s Council of Elders, which – among other duties – determines daily legislative agenda items and assigning committee chairpersons based on party representation.

In 2015, Hintze appointed Diana Kinnert as his parliamentary chief of staff, which made her the youngest chief of staff in the history of the Bundestag.

Hintze died from cancer on 26 November 2016, at the age of 66.

== Recognition ==
- 2009 – Officier de la Légion d’Honneur
- 2012 – Robert Schuman Medal
