= Goldmann (publisher) =

German publishing house

Goldmann Verlag
- Parent company: Penguin Random House
- Founded: 21 June 1922
- Founder: Wilhelm Goldmann
- Country of origin: Germany
- Headquarters location: Munich
- Key people: Georg Reuchlein
- Official website: www.randomhouse.de/Verlag/Goldmann/4000.rhd

Goldmann (formerly Wilhelm Goldmann Publishing) is a publishing house in Munich and part of the Random House Publishing Group, in turn belonging to the Bertelsmann group. They are the best-selling commercial publishers in Germany, especially in paperbacks.

Today the publishing house is an imprint of Penguin Random House, a subsidiary of Bertelsmann.

== History ==
=== Founding in Leipzig ===
The publishing house was founded in 1922 in Leipzig by Wilhelm Goldmann, who had previously worked as a traveling agent for other publishers. The new publishing house first published art books and adventure novels and celebrated its first success with the detective novels of Edgar Wallace in the mid-1920s. To which the expressive modern design of the book covers by Heinrich Hussmann, and the fact that Goldmann published an inexpensive "brochure edition" in addition to the traditional clothbound books, which became an early form of the subsequent pocket books that were later developed for the train station bookstores.

In the era of National Socialism, Goldmann also published increasingly popular science books on environmental and economic issues; the high-circulation authors of that period included, for example, Anton Zischka, Walter Pahl, Paul August Schmitz and Ferdinand Fried. During World War II, Goldmann produced special editions for the support of troops and benefited from preferred paper allocations. Although the publishing house at the Leipzig Rossmarkt was completely destroyed in an air raid in December 1943, the production could be maintained until the war ended.

After the war, Wilhelm Goldmann was arrested in February 1946 by the Soviet secret police on charges of "fascist book", and detained for four years without a trial in the special camps Mühlberg and Buchenwald. Meanwhile, the publishing house continued production to the end of 1949.

=== New start in Munich ===
After his release in January 1950, Wilhelm Goldmann moved to West Germany and led his publisher from Munich. He devoted himself increasingly to the production of cheaper paperbacks: In 1952 the first Goldmann pocket thrillers were published (also called Red Series because of their prevailing cover color); a year later the yellow Goldmann paperbacks (yellow line) started, with classics of world literature and contemporary fiction that shaped the profile of the publisher for nearly three decades. Later, other series came along, such as science fiction literature (Goldmanns Space Handbooks), and non-fiction books and guides. In the Hardcover areas, Goldmann continued to publish art books, work editions and from 1955, atlases (Goldmann's Big World Atlas, Goldmann's Hand Atlas) (Luigi Visintin, Herbert Bayer, Wilhelm Goldmann).

In 1970 Goldmann published over 2,900 titles with a total circulation of over 110 million copies, in the mid-1970s they were in terms of sales, classed as mediocre, and in terms of produce titles, one of the biggest paperback publishers in the Federal Republic. After the death of its founder in 1974, the publisher had a period of stagnation. Critics had given him a bad name and considered the program as a "general store with highly different levels of quality." Most importantly, Goldmann had not "taken care of current literature” and in the international licensing business played "so far only a minor role".

=== Sale to Bertelsmann ===
1977 Goldmann Publishing was acquired by Bertelsmann, who joined through this purchase into the growing paperback business, filled the gap in their production. Until that time, Goldman reached a production of about 4,400 titles, and had a turnover of 15 million German marks. Following the acquisition, the program focused on high-selling titles and the backlist was radically reduced. Even less profitable areas, such as the hardcover portfolio, were adjusted and personnel was reduced. Only since 1986 does Goldmann publish bound books again, and also expanded the program to non-fiction.

Goldmann published German translations of a number of Doctor Who novelisations in the 1980s, mostly stories involving the Daleks.

== Program ==
Goldmann first published works of Edgar Wallace. Because of which, Wilhelm Goldmann tried to obtain the rights for the term crime. Heinrich Hussmann and later Kurt Gundermann designed the distinctive book covers, which were later used for stage sets.

The focus of the Red series was predominantly English-language crime fiction, in which the covers were created in the corresponding color. The first title in the series was The Frog with the Mask from Edgar Wallace, who along with Agatha Christie, initially dominated the series. Later came Victor Gunn, Arthur Upfield and Thomas Muir, and even later, Francis Durbridge and Rex Stout. Other well-known recurring authors were Louis Weinert-Wilton, Earl Derr Biggers, John Creasey, Ellery Queen, Dick Francis and Bill Knox. In addition, in the Yellow series demanding literature also appeared from Stefan Heym, Walter Kempowski, Manfred Bieler and Ingeborg Drewitz.

Today at Goldmann Publishing, a wide range of fiction as well as the non-fiction is offered. Known authors include Bill Bryson, Joy Fielding, Elizabeth George, Wladimir Kaminer, Richard David Precht, Lucinda Riley, Michael Robotham and Donna Tartt. Recently Goldmann Publishing became more well known, with the Fifty Shades trilogy by British author E. L. James, in Germany alone, more than seven million copies were sold until spring 2013.

In addition to the brand Goldmann, the publisher published books on mysticism, spirituality and alternative medicine since 1980, first labeled the Goldmann Esoteric and then later branded Goldmann Arkana. Guides have been published at Goldmann since 1998 under the brand Mosaic. In 1998 the original Goldmann Esoteric became the Arkana Verlag, which is now run as an independent publisher from Random House Publishing Group. The same applies to the Mosaic Publishing.

== Others ==
Goldmann Publishing awarded the Edgar Wallace Award for crime novels in German language four times. The reason was for the increased efforts of the entire industry for German writers. The award was presented in 1963, 1965 and 1967 and most recently in 1980–81. The publisher labeled several authors, including Liselotte Appel, Helmut Grömmer, Irene Rodrian, Max Ulrich, Herma Costa and Louis Weinert-Wilton.

In 1998 Goldmann published a 24-volume encyclopedia entitled "Goldmann Lexikon".
