= Emleben =

- Municipality
- Coat of arms

- Location of Emleben within Gotha district
- Interactive map of Emleben
- Location within Germany Location within Thuringia
- Coordinates: 50°54′N 10°42′E
- Country: Germany
- State: Thuringia
- District: Gotha

Government
  - Mayor (2022–28): Philipp Kalisch (CDU)

Area
  - Total: 10.99 km^{2} (4.24 sq mi)
- Elevation: 339 m (1,112 ft)

Population (2025-12-31)
  - Total: 673
  - Density: 61.2/km^{2} (159/sq mi)
- Time zone: UTC+01:00 (CET)
  - Summer (DST): UTC+02:00 (CEST)
- Postal codes: 99869
- Dialling codes: 03621
- Vehicle registration: GTH
- Website: www.vg-apfelstaedtaue.de

Emleben is a municipality in the district of Gotha, in Thuringia, Germany.

== Notable people ==
- Gerald Hüther, German neurobiologist and author
