= Svenja Flaßpöhler =

German writer and philosopher

- Svenja Flaßpöhler on the book fair Frankfurt in October 2026
- Born: 1975 (age 50–51); Münster
- Writing career
- Subject: Philosophy

Svenja Flaßpöhler (born 1975 in Münster) is a German philosopher, journalist, and author. She has been editor-in-chief of Philosophie Magazin since 2018.

== Life and work ==
Flaßpöhler grew up in a patchwork family with a half-sister and stepsister. When she was fourteen years old, her mother left her with her stepfather in a Westphalian village. She studied philosophy, German studies and sport at the Westphalian Wilhelms University in Münster from 1994 to 2001. In 2006, she was awarded a scholarship from the German National Academic Foundation in philosophy with the thesis Der Wille zur Lust. Pornography and the Modern Subject Doctorate (PhD).

As a freelance author, she wrote numerous essays and features from 2003 to 2011, including for Deutschlandradio and the magazine Psychologie Heute.

From 2011 to 2016, Svenja Flaßpöhler was deputy editor-in-chief of Philosophie Magazin, and from 2013 to 2016 she was a book critic for 3sat's "Buchzeit" programme. Since 2013 she has been part of the programme management of the Cologne philosophy festival phil.cologne. From December 2016 to December 2017, she was managing editor for literature and the humanities at Deutschlandfunk Kultur. Since January 2018, she has been editor-in-chief of Philosophie Magazin.

For her book Mein Wille geschehe. Dying in times of assisted suicide, Flaßpöhler received the Arthur Koestler Prize from the German Society for Humane Dying in 2007. In her book Forgiveness. Vom Umgang mit Schuld (2016), she philosophically explores the phenomenon of forgiveness and tells of her encounters with people who – as perpetrators or victims – are confronted with the most severe guilt. Flaßpöhler's own story – she was abandoned by her mother at the age of fourteen and grew up with her stepfather – forms the central theme of the book, which is her most personal to date.

She is one of the supporters of the Charter of Fundamental Digital Rights of the European Union, which was published at the end of November 2016.

In January 2018, Flaßpöhler thought the MeToo campaign was well-intentioned, but that it condemned women to a passive role. On 1 February 2018, she appeared on the talk show Maybrit Illner and said "MeToo is of no use to women" and "The image that is produced is that of a passive woman reacting to an all-powerful phallus". This caused a controversy with Anne Wizorek in the talk show. In the programme Büchermarkt (DLF) on 7 May 2018, she defended her polemic Die potente Frau (2018) on the topic. In her 2021 book Sensibel. Über moderne Empfindlichkeit und die Grenze des Zumutbaren, published in 2021, Flaßpöhler explores social sensitisation and asks about the "limits of what is reasonable". Flaßpöhler works out the progressive dynamics of historical sensitisation processes, but criticises the current tendency to want to protect the subject from all impositions as a danger to liberal society. Although she shares the endeavour to use non-discriminatory language, she also sees limits and the danger of exaggeration: "It is a phantasm to believe that language can always and completely do justice to everyone and depict everything." Flaßpöhler's demand is to add a second quality to sensitivity: resilience, which is misjudged as a neoliberal optimisation strategy, especially in left-wing circles. According to Flaßpöhler, resilience is dialectically intertwined with sensitivity: it arises from vulnerability.

She was one of the first 28 signatories of an published in Emma magazine open letter to Chancellor Scholz dated 29 April 2022, which spoke out against arms deliveries to Ukraine following the Russian invasion of Ukraine.

In June 2022, she was one of the co-founders of PEN Berlin.

Svenja Flaßpöhler lives with her husband, the author Florian Werner, and their two children in Berlin.

== Publications ==
- Der Wille zur Lust. Pornographie und das moderne Subjekt. Campus, Frankfurt am Main 2007, ISBN 978-3-593-38331-6 (Dissertation Uni Münster 2006, 259 Seiten).
- Mein Wille geschehe. Sterben in Zeiten der Freitodhilfe. wjs, Berlin 2007, ISBN 978-3-937989-27-3.
- Mit Tobias Rausch, Tina Wald (Hrsg.): Kippfiguren der Wiederholung. Interdisziplinäre Untersuchungen zur Wiederholung in Literatur, Kunst und Wissenschaft. Lang, Frankfurt am Main 2007, ISBN 978-3-631-55955-0.
- Gutes Gift. Über Eifersucht und Liebe. Artemis & Winkler, Düsseldorf 2008, ISBN 978-3-491-42109-7.
- Wir Genussarbeiter. Über Freiheit und Zwang in der Leistungsgesellschaft. DVA, München 2011, ISBN 978-3-421-04462-4.
- Mein Tod gehört mir. Über selbstbestimmtes Sterben. Pantheon, München 2013, ISBN 978-3-570-55227-8.
- Verzeihen. Vom Umgang mit Schuld. DVA, München 2016, ISBN 978-3-421-04463-1.
- Die potente Frau. Für eine neue Weiblichkeit. Ullstein, Berlin 2018, ISBN 978-3-550-05076-3.
- Mit Florian Werner (2019), Zur Welt kommen. Elternschaft als philosophisches Abenteuer, München: Blessing, ISBN 978-3896675620
- Sensibel. Über moderne Empfindlichkeit und die Grenzen des Zumutbaren, Stuttgart: Klett-Cotta, 2021, ISBN 978-3608983357

== Awards ==
In 2007, Flaßpöhler received the Arthur Koestler Prize from the German Society for Human Dying (DGHS) for her book Mein Wille geschehe. Dying in times of assisted suicide.

From 2017 to 2019, Flaßpöhler served as a juror for the Bayerischer Buchpreis.

== Literature ==
- Tobias Becker (2021-10-16), "Früher war mehr Lamento", Der Spiegel (Porträt), pp. 116–119
