= Diana Kinnert =

German politician

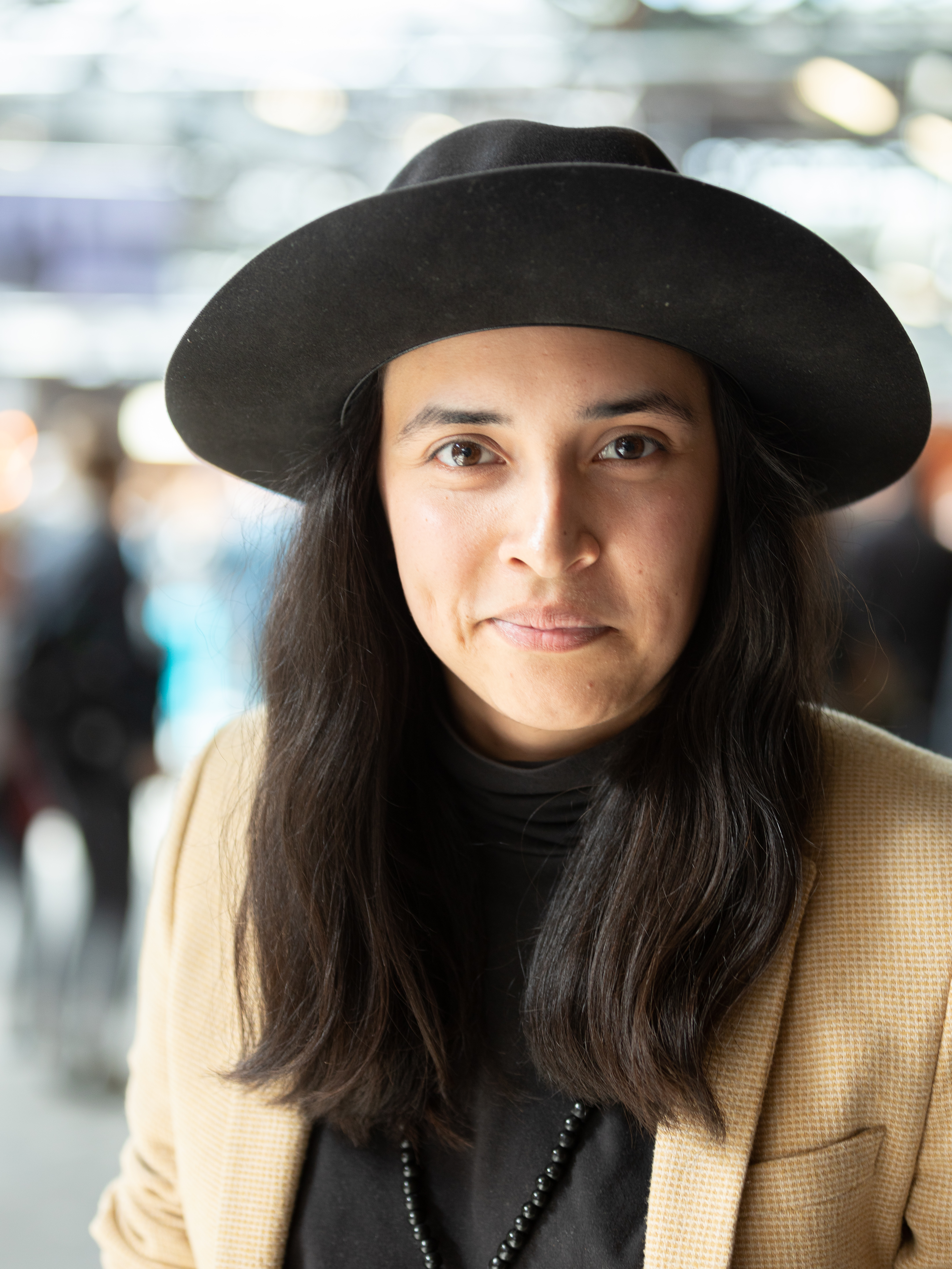
- Kinnert at re:publica in 2019
- Education: University of Göttingen; University of Amsterdam
- Occupations: Politician; Political consultant; Publisher

Diana Kinnert (born February 16, 1991) is a German political writer.

== Early life and education ==
Kinnert was born on February 16, 1991, in Wuppertal. She studied social sciences at the University of Cologne and the Free University of Berlin, and she graduated with a social science degree from the University of Göttingen in 2013. She also holds a certificate in social sciences from the University of Amsterdam.

== Career ==
In 2008 or 2009, Kinnert joined the Christian Democratic Union of Germany. In April 2015, Kinnert began to work for the then-Vice President of the Bundestag, Peter Hintze. For 2 years, starting in July 2015, Kinnert headed his parliamentary office. This made her the youngest ever Bundestag chief of staff.

In 2017, Kinnert published the book Für die Zukunft seh' ich schwarz: Plädoyer für einen modernen Konservatismus (I see black for the future: A plea for modern conservatism), the title of which is a reference to the CDU's official party color, as well as her belief that party reform was needed within the CDU. The book was published by Rowohlt Verlag. In 2019, Paul Ziemiak appointed Kinnert as a member of the Federal Committee on Social Cohesion.

== Alleged plagiarism ==
In May 2022, Kinnert's books Für die Zukunft seh' ich schwarz (The Future looks Black to Me) from 2017 and Die neue Einsamkeit (The New Loneliness) from 2021 came under scrutiny for plagiarism, with over 200 instances highlighted as "extensively copied" from several German publicists and from Wikipedia after allegations by media researcher Stefan Weber. Kinnert apologized, Hoffmann und Campe withdrew the 2021 book.

Until the plagiarism scandal, Kinnert was a frequent media commentator on German public policy, the future of party politics and particularly conservatism in Germany, and the internal culture of the CDU.
