= Margret Rasfeld =

German author and activist

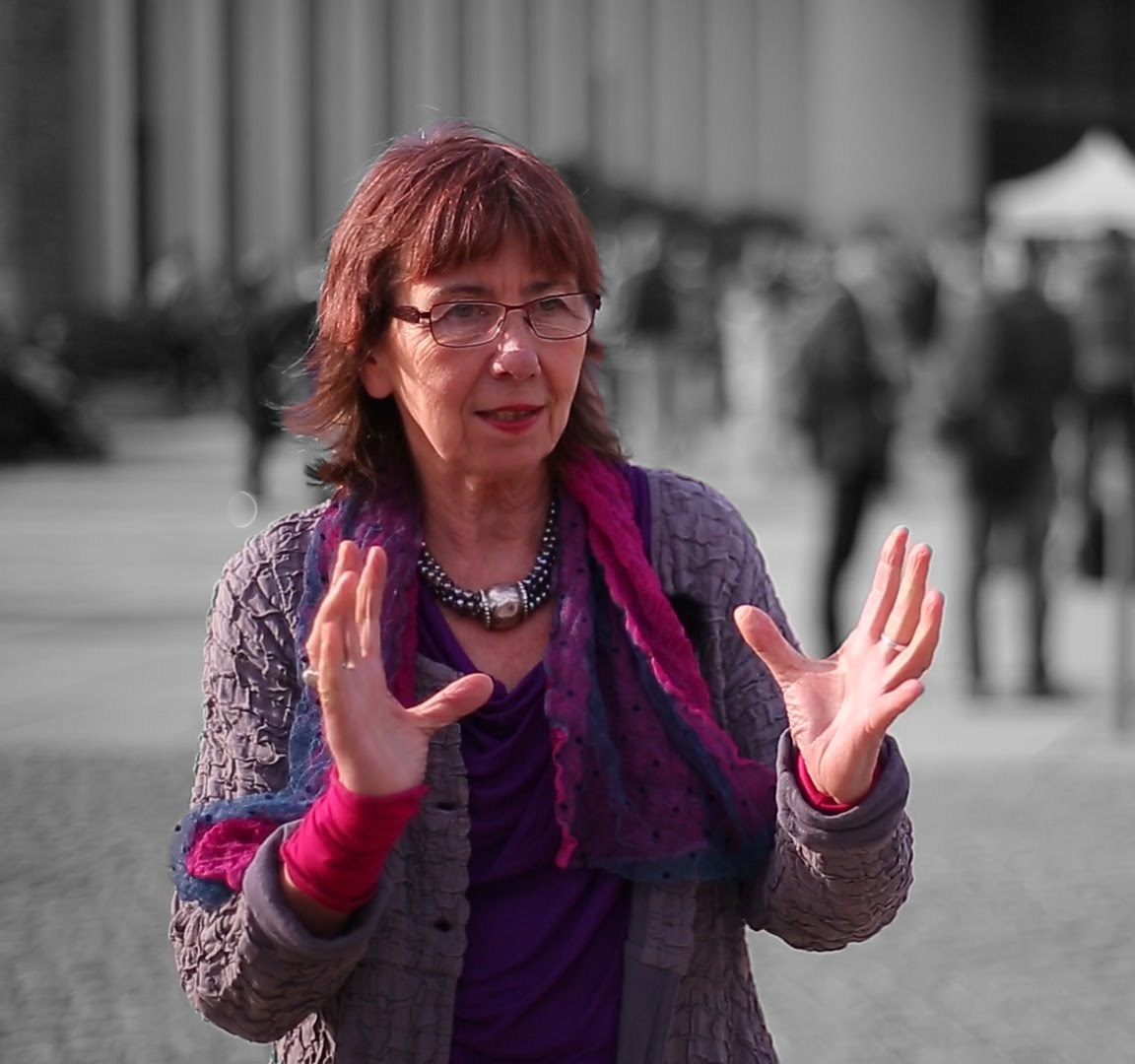
- Rasfeld in 2016
- Born: 1951 (age 74–75); Gladbeck, North Rhine-Westphalia, Germany
- Occupations: Author; Activist
- Awards: See Awards
- Website: Personal website (in German)

Margret Rasfeld (born 1951) is a German author, activist and headmistress in active retirement. She is the co-founder and current managing director of the initiative Schule im Aufbruch (school on the move) and has been elected Ashoka Fellow since 2015. Rasfeld advocates a reorientation of school education according to the guidelines of the UNESCO campaign Education for sustainable development (ESD).

== Life ==
Margret Rasfeld was born in 1951 in Gladbeck, North Rhine-Westphalia, Germany. From 1976 to 1992, she was a teacher at a Gymnasium in biology and chemistry. From 1992 to 1997, she was involved in setting up the Borbeck comprehensive school in Essen as a didactic director. From 1997 to 2007, Rasfeld built the Holsterhausen Comprehensive School, which has received many high-ranking awards for its activities in education for sustainable development.

From 2007 to 2016 she headed the Evangelical School Berlin Zentrum, which is now recognized internationally as a model for an approach "transformative education". As a result of these activities, she became a sought-after consultant and speaker in the fields of education and new work at home and abroad, as well as a consultant and trainer for teachers and school administrators.

== Further activities ==
- 2006: co-founder of buddy e.V., today education-Y
- 2011/2012: one of the six core experts in the Chancellor's future dialogue on how we want to learn.
- 2012: co-founder of the gGmbH schule-im-Aufbruch
- 2017: co-founder of ggc2030

== Awards ==
- Berliner Naturschutzpreis 2011 of the Stiftung Naturschutz Berlin
- Vision Award 2012
- querdenker Award 2013
- WeQ Award 2019

== Publications ==
Books

- EduAction - Wir machen Schule, zusammen mit Peter Spiegel, Murmann Verlag GmbH 2012
- Schulen im Aufbruch - Eine Anstiftung, zusammen mit Stephan Breidenbach, Kösel-Verlag 2014, Übersetzungen: polnisch, ukrainisch, slowakisch, kroatisch, koreanisch

Essays in non-fiction books (selection)

- Pelikan/Demmer/Hurrelmann (eds) Gesundheitsförderung durch Organisationsentwicklung, Weinheim1993
  - Margret Rasfeld: Gesundheitsförderung an einem Gymnasium im Kontext des Gesunde Städte Netzwerke der WHO
- Standorte, Jahrbuch Ruhrgebiet, 1999/2000, Essen 2000
  - Margret Rasfeld: Die Utopien von heute sind die Wirklichkeiten von morgen. AGENDA 21 und Schule – eine Einladung zum Einmischen
- Anne Sliwka, Christian Petry, Peter E. Kalb (Hrsg.): Durch Verantwortung lernen, Beltz, Weinheim 2004
  - Margret Rasfeld: Nur wenn wir ihnen etwas zutrauen: Projekt: VERANTWORTUNG – ein Konzept für die ganze Schule
- Arbeitsstelle Weltbilder(eds), Globalpatrioten. Begegnungen, Positionen und Impulse zu Klimagerechtigkeit, Biologischer und Kultureller Vielfalt, Oekom 2012
- Margret Rasfeld: Good News: Lernen bewirkt Veränderung
- Frederic Laloux, Reinventing Organizations, Nelson Parker 2014
  - Frederic Laloux: Selbstführende Schüler, Lehrer und Eltern - eine evolutionäre Schule
- Volker Heyse (eds), Aufbruch in die Zukunft. Erfolgreiche Entwicklungen von Schlüsselkompetenzen in Schulen und Hochschulen, Waxmann 2014
  - Margret Rasfeld: Was heute zu lernen für morgen wichtig ist. Ein Paradigmenwechsel
- Meinel, Weinberg, Krohn (eds): Design Thinking Live, Murmann 2015
  - Schule neu denken
- Jahrbuch Bildung für nachhaltige Entwicklung, Neue Ziele, Wien 2017
  - Die Schule von morgen ist ein Basislager
- Barz H. (eds), Handbuch Bildungsreform und Reformpädagogik. 2018 Springer VS, Wiesbaden
  - Margret Rasfeld: Ein reformpädagogisches Netzwerk entwickelt internationale Strahlkraft
  - Margret Rasfeld: Reformpädagogik an katholischen und evangelischen Schulen
- Günter Faltin (eds), Handbuch Entrepreneurship, Springer 2018
  - Margret Rasfeld: Die Evangelische Schule Berlin Zentrum - eine Schule mit Entrepreneural Spirit
- Marianne Gronert/Alban Schraut (eds), Handbuch Vereine der Reformpädagogik, Ergon 2018
  - Margret Rasfeld: Die Initiative Schule im Aufbruch
- Alfred Herrhausen Gesellschaft (eds) Weiter.Denken.Ordnen.Gestalten. Mutige Gedanken zu den Fragen unserer Zeit, Siedler 2019
  - Margret Rasfeld: Plädoyer für ein radikal neues Bildungsmodell
- Anabel Ternes von Hattburg/Matthias Schäfer(eds), Digitalpakt – was nun?: Ideen und Konzepte für zukunftsorientiertes Lernen, Springer 2020
  - Margret Rasfeld: Digitalisierung allein macht noch keine Bildungstransformation. Für einen Systemwechsel im Sinne einer Bildung für Nachhaltige Entwicklung sollten wir sie uns zunutze machen
- Steffi Burkhart (eds): Be Water, My Friend. Was Menschen, Teams und Organisationen von den Eigenschaften des Wassers lernen können, Vahlen 2020
  - Margret Rasfeld: Die Gesellschaft denkt um – ein neues Paradigma des Lernens

Essays in journals (selection):

- Praxis Schule 1/2014: Margret Rasfeld-Die Freiheit nutzen
- SchulVerwaltung spezial, 5/2014: Margret Rasfeld - Von der Sitz-und Schreibschule raus in die Lebenswirklichkeit
- SchulVerwaltung Österreich, 3/2017: Margret Rasfeld -Aufbruch zu einer neuen Lernkultur
- Gemeinsam Lernen, 3/2018: Margret Rasfeld - Das Neue wagen. Für die Welt in der wir leben wollen!
- Pädagogische Führung, 5/2019: Margret Rasfeld - Plädoyer für eine radikale Neuausrichtung der Bildung
- Zeitschrift Grundschule, Westermann 2/2020: Margret Rasfeld - Das Große beginnt im Kleinen
