= Lindauer Psychotherapiewochen =

Conference for psychodynamic psychotherapy

The Lindauer Psychotherapiewochen (LP) (Lindau Psychotherapy Weeks) are specialist conferences primarily intended as further training for doctors, psychologists, and child and youth psychotherapists, especially in the field of psychodynamic psychotherapy. These conferences span one-week and have been held annually in April, in Lindau, since 1950. Since 1967, organization of the conference has been run by the Vereinigung für psychotherapeutische Fort- und Weiterbildung (the Association for Psychotherapeutic Further Education e.V.).

The scientific directors of the conference are Cord Benecke (since 2020), Peter Henningsen (since 2011) and Dorothea Huber (since 2017).

Basic Data
Average number of participants:	4000
Specialties:	• Doctors • Psychologists • Child/adolescent psychotherapists • Social workers
Venue:	Lindau
Directors:	Cord Benecke, Peter Henningsen, Dorothea Huber
Organiser:	Association for Psychotherapeutic Further Education and Training
Address:	Lindauer Psychotherapy Weeks Pltatzl 4 a 80331 Munich
Site:	www.lptw.de

== Concept ==
Each of the two conference weeks on psychotherapy takes place on the island of Lindau, located in the German-Austrian-Swiss border triangle. The event draws around 4,000 medical, psychological, and other related professionals to two consecutive weeks of lectures, presentations, and seminars on topics selected by the Scientific Directorate and the Scientific Advisory Board. The official language of the conference is German, with occasional English-language events offered.

== History ==
In 1949, Ernst Speer and Ernst Kretschmer, re-founders of the International General Medical Society for Psychotherapy (AÄGP), held a meeting in Tübingen which marked the beginning of the Lindau Psychotherapy Weeks. The first psychotherapy course was held in 1950 and led by Ernst Speer, who had been in charge of one of the first psychotherapeutic clinics in Lindau since 1922.

After the number of participants and staff increased to about 300, the range of topics also increased accordingly. In 1955, Ernst Speer and Ernst Kretschmer agreed to forgo the conference in 1956 to give more space to other AÄGP events. The Lindau Psychotherapy Weeks re-commenced annually the following year and Ernst Speer held his last event of this kind in 1958. Helmuth Stolze, the nephew of Ernst Speer, then assumed responsibility for the organization and design of the conference from his uncle. As early as 1949, Stolze had trained in psychotherapeutic training at the courses for psychotherapy run by Ernst Kretschmer. From 1959, Stolze began to shape its didactic-scientific concept and collegial atmosphere open to all psychotherapeutic directions, maintaining this for 20 years. To promote self-awareness and new processes, a second week of exercises and seminars was introduced in 1959. In the same year, the Lindau Psychotherapy Week was organized in agreement with the AÄGP under the chairmanship of Hanns Ruffin and the management of Helmuth Stolze.

In 1961, the 11th Lindau Psychotherapy Week introduced the concept of self-experience groups. Participants underwent analytical group psychotherapy for two to four sessions per year, in order to explore a potential path of further training. This form of work was soon incorporated into psychotherapeutic training, a development having first been suggested by W. Schindler in 1951.

Following a one-year period of working for Viktor von Weizsäcker in Heidelberg, psychiatrist Erich Lindemann emigrated to Harvard in the United States. From 1960 on, Lindemann led a self-awareness group in Lindau. Ernst Speer died in Lindau on 28 March 1964 with Ernst Kretschmer following shortly behind later in the same year. In 1965, a "Program Committee" was formed to design the main themes and lectures for the conference, which included Helmuth Stolze (Munich), Hanspeter Harlfinger (Tübingen-Wehen), Dietrich Langen (Tübingen-Mainz), Leonhard Schlegel (Zurich), Eckart Wiesenhütter (Würzburg-Tübingen-Bethel), Wulf Wunnenberg (Hamburg), and Peter Hahn (Heidelberg).

In 1967, the "Vereinigung für psychotherapeutische Fort- und Weiterbildung e.V." (Association for Psychotherapeutic Training and Further Education) was established under the leadership of Paul Kluge, who now acts as the legal sponsor of the Lindau Psychotherapy Weeks. In the 1970s, the Lindau Psychotherapy Weeks began to transform from a primarily lecture-based event into a conference providing courses, seminars, and exercises. The program was structured in such a way that participants could attend either of the two weeks independently. In 1974, Helmut Remmler and Helmuth Stolze officially took over the management, with Remmler having been involved in the planning and organization since 1973. After 20 years, Stolze passed the directorship of the Psychotherapy Weeks to his successors: Remmler, Peter Buchheim, and Theodor Seifert in 1978.

In 1976 and 1983, Paul Watzlawick, an Austrian-born psychoanalyst and sociologist, presented his "Psychotherapeutic Theory of Communication" to conference attendees. Beginning in 1984, the two Lindau Psychotherapy Weeks were organized in the same manner, with each week having its own central theme.

In 1986, Helmut Remmler retired from his role in the scientific management of the conference, with Peter Buchheim and Theodor Seifert taking over responsibility. Manfred Cierpka, a psychiatrist and psychoanalyst from Ulm who had been involved in the program design since 1989, was then elected by the board (consisting of Peter-Christian Fink, Werner Stucke, Barbara Buddeberg-Fischer) to become a director. The association also holds honorary membership, of whom Clemens Henrich and Paul Kluge are members. In 1987, Otto F. Kernberg made his first appearance in Lindau, where he gave lectures on the topics of "Concepts of the psychotherapeutic relationship" and "What works in the psychotherapy of severe personality disorders?"

Ernst Kretschmer, Hanns Ruffin, and Winkler were instrumental in forming the relationship between the Association for Applied Psychotherapy in German (AÄGP) and the German Society of Psychotherapy (LP). Later, Helmut Enke, Heinz-Günter Rechenberger, Annelise Heigl-Evers and Paul Kluge worked on the executive committees of both organizations in order to further the development of psychotherapy. Werner Stucke, who chaired both the AÄGP and the Vereinigung für Psychotherapeutische Weiterbildung (Association for Psychotherapeutic Continuing Education), was particularly influential in the organization of information events on psychotherapeutic further education in Lindau.

David Orlinsky, former President of the North American Society for Psychotherapy Research, lectured in 1996 and 1998 on the topic of "The Professional and Personal Development of Psychotherapists". As early as 1991, in collaboration with the Collaborative Research Network (CRN), David Orlinsky and Horst Kächele began an investigation into the development, further training and activities of psychotherapists at the 41st Lindau Psychotherapy Weeks. Theodor Seifert was part of the management team until 1998 when Peter Buchheim and Manfred Cierpka took over, but continued to be available to the Lindau Psychotherapy Weeks as an advisor to the management and as a member of the scientific advisory board. From 2001, Verena Kast was part of the Scientific Board, from which Peter Buchheim resigned in 2003. In 2011 Peter Henningsen joined the Scientific Board.

Since 2009, the Vereinigung für psychotherapeutische Fort- und Weiterbildung e. V. (Association for Psychotherapeutic Continuing Education) has been organising and funding support programs for young psychotherapists with the aim of imparting skills on topics such as "No fear of groups" and "Dealing with relatives in psychotherapy" to young professionals and newcomers to the profession who work in clinics or in outpatient settings.

To mark the 60th Lindau Psychotherapy Weeks in 2010, the Vereinigung für psychotherapeutische Fort- und Weiterbildung e.V. commissioned historian Phillipp Mettauer to publish an account of the history of the conference. The findings of Mettauer's research revealed that the focus on the political processes and developments, resulting from the post-war reconstruction of the Federal Republic of Germany, had provided an alibi and distraction from engaging in a critical examination of the legacy of the Third Reich. In the present climate, an overdue discussion on this subject has been taking place.

In 2017, Dorothea Huber joined the Scientific Directorate as a new member. Manfred Cierpka, a member since 1990, died in December 2017 followed by Theodor Seifert in May 2018. Verena Kast, a member since 2001, left the Scientific Directorate at the end of April 2020. As of 2020, psychologist Cord Benecke, who was previously a member of the Scientific Advisory Board of the Lindau Psychotherapy Weeks for many years, joined as a new member of the management.

== Quality assurance ==
Quality assurance of the Lindau Psychotherapy Weeks began in 1993. Initially, this quality assessment occurred through evaluation studies, later replaced by an annual evaluation. The acceptance and satisfaction of each event, and of the entire conference, are reported back to the lecturers.
