= Richard David Precht =

German philosopher and author (born 1964)

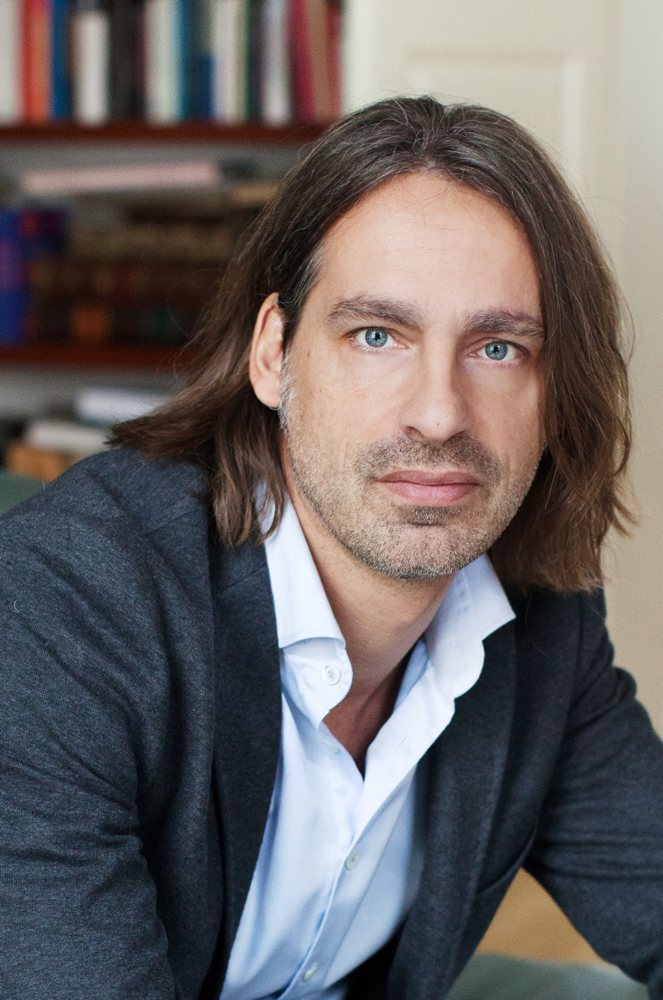
- Precht in 2015
- Born: 8 December 1964 (age 61); Solingen, West Germany
- Awards: See Awards

Education
- Education: University of Cologne

Philosophical work
- Era: 21st-century philosophy
- Region: Western philosophy

Richard David Precht (German: [ˈʁɪçaʁt ˈdaːvɪt ˈpʁɛçt]; born 8 December 1964) is a German philosopher and author of successful popular science books about philosophical issues. He hosts the TV show "Precht" on ZDF.

He was an honorary professor of philosophy at the Leuphana University of Lüneburg from 2011 to October 2023 and is an honorary professor of philosophy and aesthetics at the Hanns Eisler University of Music in Berlin. Since the great success with Wer bin ich – und wenn ja, wie viele? (English title: Who am I – and if so, how many?), Precht's books on philosophical or sociopolitical topics became bestsellers.

== Life ==
Richard David Precht was born and raised in Solingen. His father, Hans-Jürgen Precht, was born in Hanover in 1933, and his mother in Neuhof bei Berlin in 1938. After higher secondary schooling Abitur at the Gymnasium Schwertstraße in Solingen, Precht did his alternative service as a parish worker. Later he studied philosophy, German studies and history of art at the University of Cologne. In 1994, he obtained a doctorate (Dr. phil.) in German studies. From 1991 to 1995 he worked as a scientific assistant in a cognitive science research project.

In 1997, Precht was Arthur F. Burns Fellow at Chicago Tribune. Two years later, Precht received the Heinz-Kühn-Scholarship. In 2000–01, he was Fellow at the European College of Journalism, and in 2001, he was awarded for journalism in the field of biomedical studies.

As an essayist, Precht has written for German newspapers and magazines. From 2002 to 2004 he was a columnist of Literaturen, a sophisticated intellectual literary magazine, and from 2005 to 2008 he was freelance moderator of Tageszeichen, a broadcast program of WDR.

Precht has a son and three stepchildren.

== Works ==
Precht has had success with literary works as well as non-fiction.

=== Dissertation ===
Precht's 1994 PhD dissertation "Die gleitende Logik der Seele. Ästhetische Selbstreflexivität in Robert Musils 'Der Mann ohne Eigenschaften'", is a phenomenological analysis of effective structures in Musil's book.

=== Fiction books ===
In 1999, Precht together with his brother Georg Jonathan wrote the detective Bildungsroman Das Schiff im Noor. The novel opens in year 1985 and uses the Danish island Lilleö (in reality: Ærø) as a backdrop for a complicated web of analogies and motives, for example the relation between theology and policework. On the surface, the novel is a detective story about a sunken ship and a homicide from a long time ago. The novel deals in its more profound significance with the order of things. Even the philosopher Michel Foucault appears in the shape of the conservator Mikkel Folket. The novel was republished in 2009 with the original planned name Die Instrumente des Herrn Jörgensen.

The novel Die Kosmonauten from 2002 deals with the love story and finding of identity of Georg and Rosalie in their late twenties where they had got to know each other in Cologne and shortly afterwards moved together to Berlin in the post-reunification period 1990–91. They first live the life of Bohemians in Berlin-Mitte from which Rosalie increasingly distances herself over the course of the story. She changes her mindset, falls in love with another man and parts from Georg to have a bourgeois lifestyle. At the end of the novel their common friend Leonhard is killed in a tragic accident. Parallel to this story, Precht recounts in short the tragic destiny of Sergei Krikalev, the last cosmonaut of the Soviet Union.

In 2005, Precht published his autobiographical book Lenin kam nur bis zum Lüdenscheid – Meine kleine deutsche Revolution in which he recalls from a child's perspective his childhood in the 1970s within a leftwing family who stands close to the party DKP. Simultaneously, he reviews the global political events in West Germany and East Germany in the 1960s, 1970s and 1980s and describes political attitudes, ideological mindsets as well as details of an everyday life in this era. The book received numerously positive critics and it was filmed with the support of WDR, SWR and the Filmstiftung Nordrhein-Westfalen. In 2008, the film came out in many German repertory cinemas and reached 20,000 viewers.

=== Philosophical books ===
In 1997, Precht's Noahs Erbe was published. The book deals with the ethical question in relation between humans and animals as well as their social consequences. As a result, he pleads for a change in the treatment of animals on the basis of a "ethic of nescience".

Originally planned as an introduction to philosophy for young people, Precht's most successful work, the non-fiction Wer bin ich – und wenn ja, wie viele? (English: "Who am I – and if so, how many?"; release of the English version in April 2011) was published in 2007. It is an introduction to philosophy linking the results of brain research, psychology, behaviour research and other sciences. The book is structured according to Kant's classification: What can I know? What ought I to do? What may I hope? After a recommendation by Elke Heidenreich, the book occupied first place in the Spiegel bestseller list. It sold over 1,000,000 copies and was translated into 32 languages. According to a non-fiction bestseller list by the German weekly Spiegel, it was the most successful hardcover non-fiction of the year 2008 and achieved third place in the bestseller of the decade.

In 2009, the non-fiction Liebe – ein unordentliches Gefühl links the scientific-biological view of sexuality and love with the psychological and social-cultural circumstances of our comprehension and behaviour in love. Precht's main thesis is that sexual love doesn't come from sexuality but from the parent-child relationship. The need for attachment and closeness comes from the childhood relationship to the parents and it later searches in the sexual partner an equivalent. Thus, love is a projection of (early-)childhood needs and experiences in love. From March 2009 to December 2009 it was on the Spiegel bestseller list.

The non-fiction Die Kunst kein Egoist zu sein was published in 2010. The book is structured in three parts: "good and evil", "willing and doing" and "morality and society". Precht deals with the question of moral at first (philosophical and evolutionary) and comes to the conclusion that humans have a relatively high need to be in tune with themselves and also to consider themselves well. In the second moral-psychological part however, he examines numerous strategies by which people trick themselves by repressing, replacing, comparing or feeling not to be responsible. In the third part, he reflects about consequences for our present society. He criticizes the renunciation of politics to the regulatory policy in the economy, pleads for more civic commitment and for a transformation of democracy by new forms of citizen participation and co-partnership.

Warum gibt es alles und nicht nichts?: Ein Ausflug in die Philosophie tackles the main questions in philosophy in an easy-to-understand structure and prose, making the contents suitable for both children and adults. Visiting the main sights of Berlin with his son Oskar, Precht gives a historic city outline while discussing the big topics of ethics, aesthetics and consciousness. The book was published by Goldmann Verlag in 2011.

Another popular non-fiction book written by Precht is Anna, die Schule und der liebe Gott: Der Verrat des Bildungssystems an unseren Kindern, published by Goldmann Verlag in 2013, in which he criticizes the German school system.

=== Publishing ===
Precht has been co-publisher of the magazine agora42 since December 2010. It is a social fiasco that "economists are hardly interested in philosophy and philosophers are hardly interested in economics", Precht says.

== Awards ==
- 2011: IQ Award

== Positions and reception ==
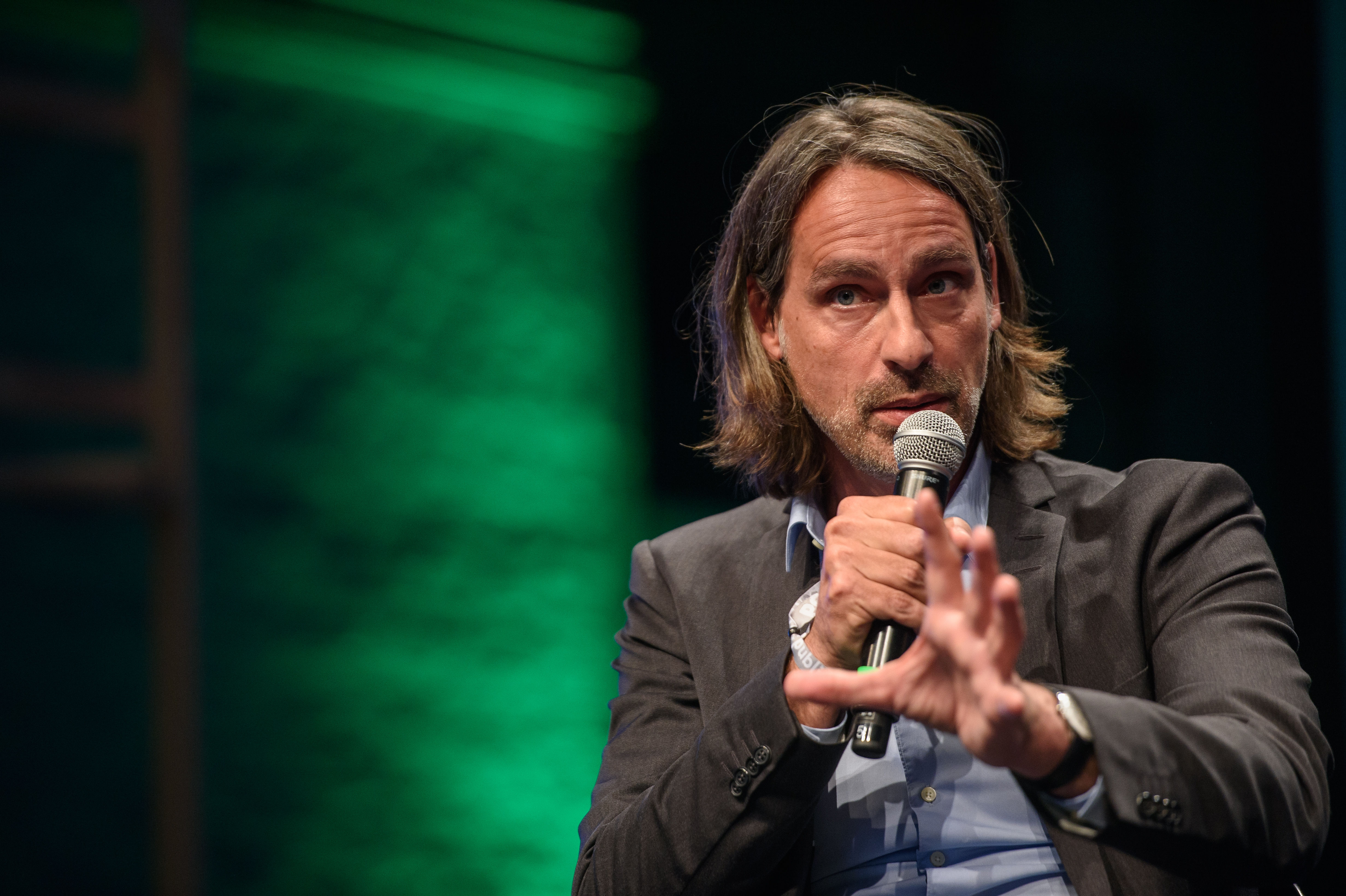
Precht in 2018

Precht is an advocate of a new civil society. He stands philosophically close to the American communitarianism, the idea of democratizing society with a higher civic sense of community. He considers the obligation of economy and politics for constant economic growth as damaging. He is in favour of a basic income. In the debate about the thesis of Thilo Sarrazin Precht views the accusations toward the migrants as a diversion with regard to the more fundamental question about the distribution, the growing gap between rich and poor and the establishment of moral-distant settings in the upper class as well as the under class. Precht is a severe critic of the Bundeswehr mission in Afghanistan. He is also a sharp critic of the school system in Germany.

During the Russian invasion of Ukraine, Precht was criticized for his positions. Most notably, during the first days of the invasion in early March 2022, he had concluded on multiple occasions that Ukraine could not win the war and despite having the right of self-defense, should have the wisdom to know when to surrender.
