= List of Social Democratic Party of Germany members =

A list of politicians and notable members of the Social Democratic Party of Germany:

A B C D E F G H I J K L M N O P Q R S T U V W X Y Z

== A ==
- Sanae Abdi
- Karl Aberle
- Wolfgang Abendroth
- Kurt Adams
- Dieter Aderhold
- Lore Agnes
- Johannes Agnoli
- Adis Ahmetovic
- Doris Ahnen
- Timo Ahr
- Lale Akgün
- Reem Alabali-Radovan
- Heinrich Albertz
- Luise Albertz
- Torsten Albig
- Lisa Albrecht
- Takis Mehmet Ali
- Heinrich Aller
- Britta Altenkamp
- Jakob Altmaier
- Gregor Amann
- Dagmar Andres
- Gerd Andres
- Nina Andrieshen
- Niels Annen
- Hans Apel
- Bruno Apitz
- Jan Appel
- Max Archimowitz
- Martha Arendsee
- Walter Arendt
- Johannes Arlt
- Rudi Arndt
- Ingrid Arndt-Brauer
- Horst Arnold, de:Horst Arnold (Politiker)
- Rainer Arnold
- Leo Arons
- Karl Artelt
- Pascal Arweiler
- Rosa Aschenbrenner
- Elisabeth Aßmann
- Jörg Asmussen
- Erhard Auer
- Siegfried Aufhäuser
- Elise Augustat
- Ferdinand Auth
- Sevim Aydin

== B ==
- Fritz Baade
- Brian Baatzsch
- Till Backhaus
- Ernst Bader
- Egon Bahr
- Ernst Bahr
- Karl Baier
- Rodion Bakum
- Walter Ballhause
- Hans Baluschek
- Nezahat Baradari
- Volkan Baran
- Arnulf Baring
- Jürgen Barke
- Doris Barnett
- Johannes Barsch
- Hans-Peter Bartels
- Karl Barth
- Julia Barth-Dworzynski
- Klaus Barthel
- Kurt Barthel
- Max Barthel
- Heiner Bartling
- Sören Bartol
- Bärbel Bas
- Bernhard Bästlein
- Sabine Bätzing
- Fritz Bauer
- Gustav Bauer
- Andreas Bausewein
- August Bebel
- Karl Bechert
- Jan-Philipp Beck
- Kurt Beck
- Alexandra Becker
- Franziska Becker
- Willi Becker
- Uwe Beckmeyer
- Walter Behrendt
- Daniela Behrens
- Jens Behrens
- Ksenija Bekeris
- Otto Bennemann
- Klaus Uwe Benneter
- Albert Berg
- Axel Berg
- Ute Berg
- Guido van den Berg
- Jürgen Berghahn
- Christine Bergmann
- Karl Bergmann
- Ludwig Bergsträsser
- Cem Berk
- Karl Wilhelm Berkhan
- Klaus Bernbacher
- Eduard Bernstein
- Werner Best, de:Werner Best (Politiker, 1927)
- Jens Beutel
- Petra Bierwirth
- Karin Binder
- Sascha Binder, de:Sascha Binder
- Rudolf Bindig
- Lothar Binding
- Frieder Birzele
- Gabriele Bischoff
- Peter Blachstein
- Inge Blask
- Willi Bleicher
- Joseph Bloch
- Nico Bloem
- Volker Blumentritt
- Christoph Blumhardt
- Hans Böckler
- Arnold Bode
- Ludwig Bodenbender, de:Ludwig Bodenbender
- Nicola Böcker-Giannini
- Kurt Bodewig
- Ibrahim Böhme
- Rolf Böhme
- Björn Böhning
- Gustav Böhrnsen
- Jens Böhrnsen
- Gerhard Bökel, de:Gerhard Bökel
- Clemens Bollen
- Gerd Bollmann
- Stefan Bolln, de:Stefan Bolln
- Theodor Bömelburg
- Julian Borchardt
- Daniel Born
- Holger Börner
- Richard Borowski
- Hermann Böse
- Sandra Boser
- Andreas Bovenschulte
- Heinrich Brandler
- Klaus Brandner
- Willy Brandt
- Willi Brase
- Max Brauer
- Kira Braun
- Lily Braun
- Otto Braun
- Julius Brecht
- Fred Breinersdorfer
- Rudolf Breitscheid
- Sylvia Bretschneider
- Hans Breuer
- Hermann Breymann
- Leni Breymaier
- Hermann Brill
- Bernhard Brinkmann
- Rainer Brinkmann
- Charlotte Britz
- Hans Brodmerkel
- James Broh
- Carsten Brosda
- Gerhard Brosi
- Erich Brost
- Alwin Brück
- Herbert Brückner, de:Herbert Brückner
- Anke Brunn
- Florian von Brunn
- Karl-Heinz Brunner
- Manfred Bruns
- Werner Bruschke
- Christine Buchholz
- Daniel Buchholz
- Albert Buchmann
- Dennis Buchner
- Wilhelm Buck
- Hermann Budzislawski
- Heinz Bühringer, de:Heinz Bühringer
- Hans Peter Bull
- Jens Bullerjahn
- Udo Bullmann
- Edelgard Bulmahn
- Andreas von Bülow
- Marco Bülow
- Ulla Burchardt
- Kurt Bürger
- Martin Burkert
- Delara Burkhardt
- Michael Bürsch
- Heinz Buschkowsky
- Astrid-Sabine Busse

== C ==
- Ursula Caberta
- Derya Çağlar
- Isabel Cademartori
- Christian Carstensen
- Marion Caspers-Merk
- Lars Castellucci
- Wolf-Michael Catenhusen
- Armin Clauss
- Wolfgang Clement
- Max Cohen
- Oskar Cohn
- Kemir Čolić
- Ulrich Commerçon
- Kurt Conrad
- Wilhelm Conrad
- Frederick Cordes
- Peter Corterier
- Arthur Crispien
- Heinrich Cunow

== D ==
- Patrick Dahlemann
- Christian Dahm
- Gustav Dahrendorf
- Ralf Dahrendorf
- Marta Damkowski
- Peter Danckert
- Herta Däubler-Gmelin
- Robert Daum
- Ernst Däumig
- Eduard David
- Vera Dedanwala
- Christoph Degen
- Manfred Degen
- Franz Josef Degenhardt
- Willy Dehnkamp
- Karl Deichmann
- Heinrich Deist
- Hakan Demir
- Daniela De Ridder
- Karamba Diaby
- Bärbel Dieckmann
- Jochen Dieckmann
- Martin Diedenhofen
- Nils Diederich
- Georg Diederichs
- Bruno Diekmann
- Jan Dieren
- Robert Dißmann
- Christian von Ditfurth
- Wilhelm Dittmann
- Sabine Dittmar
- Klaus von Dohnanyi
- Hilde Domin
- Uwe Döring
- Heinrich Drake
- Hanno Drechsler
- Wilhelm Dreher
- Horst Dreier
- Stefanie Drese
- Andreas Dressel
- Malu Dreyer
- Franziska Drohsel
- Falko Droßmann
- Gordan Dudas
- Deborah Düring
- Garrelt Duin
- Martin Dulig
- Käte Duncker
- Freimut Duve
- Timon Dzienus

== E ==
- Fritz Eberhard
- Hugo Eberlein
- Friedrich Ebert
- Friedrich Ebert Jr.
- Michael Ebling
- Axel Echeverria
- Ingrid Eckel, de:Ingrid Eckel
- Sebastian Edathy
- Horst Ehmke
- Herbert Ehrenberg
- Hans Eichel
- Emil Eichhorn
- Wilhelmine Eichler
- Willi Eichler
- Sonja Eichwede
- Heinrich Graf von Einsiedel
- Kurt Eisner
- Irene Ellenberger
- August Enderle
- Irmgard Enderle
- Ronja Endres
- Ludwig Engel
- Ursula Engelen-Kefer
- Heike Engelhardt
- Michaela Engelmeier
- Björn Engholm
- Erhard Eppler
- Rüdiger Erben
- Ute Erdsiek-Rave
- Eduard Erkes
- Britta Ernst
- Eugen Ernst
- Klaus Ernst
- Wiebke Esdar
- Saskia Esken
- Hermann Esser
- Karin Evers-Meyer
- Carmen Everts
- Arthur Ewert

== F ==
- Nancy Faeser
- Ariane Fäscher
- Florian Fahrtmann
- Annette Faße
- Alfred Faust
- Felix Fechenbach
- Max Fechner
- Josef Felder
- Peter Feldmann
- Ludwig Fellermaier
- Elke Ferner, de:Elke Ferner
- Friedrich Kurt Fiedler
- Werner Figgen, de:Werner Figgen
- Rüdiger Fikentscher
- Erwin Fischer
- Heinrich Fischer, de:Heinrich Fischer (Politiker, 1895)
- Kurt Fischer
- Ottfried Fischer
- Peter Fischer
- Richard Fischer
- Robert Fischer
- Karina Fissmann-Renner
- Ossip K. Flechtheim
- Knut Fleckenstein
- Hermann Fleissner
- Katharina Focke
- Ernst Fraenkel
- Ludwig Frank
- Edgar Franke
- Egon Franke
- Otto Franke
- Paul Franken
- Steffen Freiberg
- Dagmar Freitag
- Walter Freitag
- Alfred Frenzel
- Philipp Fries
- Hans-Georg Fritz
- Friedrich Wilhelm Fritzsche
- Paul Frölich
- Heinz Fromm
- Anke Fuchs
- Eduard Fuchs
- Emil Fuchs
- Erich Fuchs
- Annette Fugmann-Heesing
- Stefan Fulst-Blei
- Karl-Heinz Funke

== G ==
- Volkmar Gabert
- Fritz Gäbler
- Sigmar Gabriel
- Georg Gaßmann
- Susanne Gaschke
- Ferdinand Gatzweiler
- Manuel Gava
- Heike Gebhard
- Evelyne Gebhardt
- Herta Geffke
- Julius Gehl
- Jens Geier
- Anton Geiß
- Imanuel Geiss
- Heiko Gentzel
- Volker Gerhardt
- Sven Gerich
- Florian Gerster
- Martin Gerster
- Anna Geyer
- Klara Geywitz
- Franziska Giffey
- Norbert Glante
- Gerhard Glogowski
- Peter Glotz
- Lisa Gnadl, de:Lisa Gnadl
- Armand Goegg
- Arthur Goldstein
- Ivo Gönner
- Willi Görlach
- Robert Görlinger
- Herta Gotthelf
- Horst Grabert
- Georg Gradnauer
- Günter Grass
- Helga Grebing
- Timon Gremmels
- Helmut Greulich
- Monika Griefahn
- Kerstin Griese
- Holger Grießhammer
- Adolf Grimme
- Joist Grolle
- Lissy Gröner
- Gabriele Groneberg
- Constantin Grosch
- Michael Groschek
- Andy Grote
- Otto Grotewohl
- Uli Grötsch
- Falko Grube
- Karl Grünberg
- Anton Grylewicz
- Albert Grzesinski
- Kurt Gscheidle
- Günter Guillaume
- Ravindra Gujjula
- Thore Güldner
- Mustafa Güngör
- Wolfgang Gunkel
- Ketty Guttmann

== H ==
- Sascha Haas
- Hugo Haase
- Martin Habersaat
- Konrad Haenisch
- Wilhelm Haferkamp
- Rita Hagl-Kehl
- Metin Hakverdi
- Martin Haller
- Gabriele Hammelrath
- Anton Hammerbacher
- Klaus Hänsch
- Nils Hansen
- Werner Hansen
- Julia Harenz
- Georg Häring, de:Georg Häring
- Lennart Harms
- Ernst von Harnack
- Martha Harpf
- Michael Hartmann
- Sebastian Hartmann
- Thomas Hartung, de:Thomas Hartung (Politiker)
- Peter Hartz
- Wilhelm Hasenclever
- Theodor Haubach
- Volker Hauff
- Jutta Haug
- Inge Hecht
- Fritz Heckert
- Gustav Heckmann
- Konrad Heiden
- Hubertus Heil
- Ernst Heilmann
- Eduard Heimann
- Willi Hein
- Fritz Heine
- Wolfgang Heine
- Gustav Heinemann
- Sven Heinemann
- Kurt Heinig
- Siegfried Heinke
- Barbara Hendricks
- Alfred Henke
- Rolf Henrich
- Fritz Henßler
- Clarissa Herbst
- Erna Herchenröder
- Gottlieb Hering
- Luise Herklotz
- Marc Herter
- Carl Herz
- Gustav Herzog
- Birgit Hesse
- Heike Heubach
- Dora Heyenn
- Karl-Heinz Hiersemann, de:Karl-Heinz Hiersemann
- Gerhard Hildebrand
- Regine Hildebrandt
- Rudolf Hilferding
- Antonia Hillberg
- Gabriele Hiller-Ohm
- Rainer Hinderer, de:Rainer Hinderer
- Petra Hinz
- Tom Hinzmann
- Martin Hirsch
- Paul Hirsch
- Max Hirschberg
- Thomas Hitschler
- Clemens Hoch
- Wilhelm Höcker
- Wolfgang Hoderlein, de:Wolfgang Hoderlein
- Wilhelm Hoegner
- Adolf Hofer
- Magdalene Hoff
- Christel Hoffmann
- Johannes Hoffmann
- Oskar Hoffmann
- Alexander Hofmann
- Heike Hofmann
- Hartmut Holzapfel
- Bodo Hombach
- Reinhard Höppner
- Otto Hörsing
- Lana Horstmann
- Jasmina Hostert
- Albert Hotopp
- Franz Hruska
- Antje Huber
- Wolfgang Huber
- Verena Hubertz
- Stefanie Hubig
- Paul Hug
- Herbert Hupka
- Ferdinand Husung

== I ==
- Karl Ibach

== J ==
- Eberhard Jäckel
- Franz Jacob
- Mathilde Jacob
- Hauke Jagau
- Ralf Jäger
- Gerhard Jahn
- Wenzel Jaksch
- Jann-Peter Janssen
- Ilse Janz, de:Ilse Janz
- Heinrich Jasper
- Leo Jogiches
- Karin Jöns
- Jörg Jordan, de:Jörg Jordan
- August Jordan
- Wolfgang Jörg
- Mike Josef
- Reinhold Jost
- Marie Juchacz
- Nadine Julitz
- Burkhard Jung
- Magnus Jung
- Thomas Jung
- Gustav Just
- Wolfgang Jüttner

== K ==
- Emmy Kaemmerer
- Stefan Kämmerling
- Bijan Kaffenberger
- Luise Kähler
- Wilhelmine Kähler
- Johannes Kahrs
- Wilhelm Kaisen
- Elisabeth Kaiser
- Roland Kaiser
- Hermann-Josef Kaltenborn
- Moritz Kalthoff
- Christina Kampmann
- Lisa Kapteinat
- Macit Karaahmetoğlu
- Helmut Kasimier
- Carlos Kasper
- Anna Kassautzki
- Rudolf Katz
- Gabriele Katzmarek
- Sylvia-Yvonne Kaufmann
- Karl Kautsky
- Friedrich Kellner
- Petra Kelly
- Karl-Hans Kern
- Franziska Kersten
- Hakki Keskin
- Heinz Kindermann
- Johanna Kirchner
- Cansel Kiziltepe
- Helmut Kleebank
- Gerhard Kleinmagd
- Wilhelm Kleemann, de:Wilhelm Kleemann
- Dorothea Kliche-Behnke, de:Dorothea Kliche-Behnke
- Kristian Klinck
- Klaus Klingner
- Reinhard Klimmt
- Lars Klingbeil
- Annika Klose
- Hans-Ulrich Klose
- Astrid Klug
- Heinz Kluncker
- Tim Klüssendorf
- Johann Knief
- Waldemar von Knoeringen, de:Waldemar von Knoeringen
- Josefine Koebe
- Karl Koch
- Sophie Koch
- Bernard Koenen
- Wilhelm Koenen
- Bärbel Kofler
- Katharina Kohl
- Natascha Kohnen
- Walter Kolbow
- Hinrich Wilhelm Kopf
- Regina Kopp-Herr
- Petra Köpping
- Elvan Korkmaz
- Olga Körner
- Karl Korsch
- Otto Körting
- Hans Koschnick
- Adolf Köster
- Steffen Krach
- Hannelore Kraft
- Anni Krahnstöver
- Hubertus Kramer
- Anette Kramme
- Emil Krause, de:Emil Krause
- Walter Krause, de:Walter Krause (Politiker, 1912)
- Marie Kreft
- Constanze Krehl
- Dunja Kreiser
- Wolfgang Kreissl-Dörfler
- Martin Kröber
- Jürgen Krogmann
- Hans Krollmann, de:Hans Krollmann
- Georg Kronawitter
- Hedwig Krüger
- Hans-Jürgen Krupp
- Alfred Kubel
- Fritz Kuhn
- Heinz Kühn
- Marianne Kühn
- Kevin Kühnert
- Helmut Kuhne
- Jörg Kukies
- Alwin Kulawig, de:Alwin Kulawig
- Konrad Kunick, de:Konrad Kunick
- Franz Künstler
- Alexander Kuntze
- Karl-Heinz Kurras
- Christine Kurzhals
- Thomas Kutschaty
- Wolfram Kuschke

== L ==
- Friedel Läpple, de:Friedel Läpple
- Oskar Lafontaine
- Manfred Lahnstein
- Christine Lambrecht
- Max Landero
- Otto Landsberg
- Erwin Lang
- Ulrich Lang, de:Ulrich Lang
- Corinna Lange
- Katrin Lange
- Antonie Langendorf
- David Langner
- Heinrich Laufenberg
- Lauritz Lauritzen
- Karl Lauterbach
- Georg Leber
- Julius Leber
- Georg Ledebour
- Emil Lederer
- Carl Legien
- Helmut Lehmann
- Hinrich Lehmann-Grube
- Richard Lehners
- Jo Leinen
- Willi Lemke
- Alfred Lemmnitz
- Paul Lensch
- Hanfried Lenz
- Melanie Leonhard
- Willy Leow
- Wilhelm Leuschner
- Paul Levi
- Eugen Leviné
- Alfred Levy
- Kurt Lichtenstein
- Dörte Liebetruth
- Karl Liebknecht
- Wilhelm Liebknecht
- Hermann Liebmann
- Olaf Lies
- Jutta Limbach
- Esra Limbacher
- Rudolf Lindau
- Helge Lindh
- Sören Link
- Richard Lipinski
- Burkhard Lischka
- Eugen Loderer
- Paul Löbe
- Selma Lohse
- Thomas Losse-Müller
- Richard Löwenthal
- Paul Lohmann
- Wolf von Lojewski
- Siegfried Lorenz
- Kurt Löwenstein
- Karsten Lucke
- Hermann Lübbe
- Heidi Lück
- Christine Lucyga
- Hermann Lüdemann
- Nadja Lüders
- Tamara Lüdke
- Kirsten Lühmann
- Erich Lüth
- Rosa Luxemburg

== M ==
- Heiko Maas
- Hermann Maaß
- Karl Mache
- Anton Maegerle
- Dennis Maelzer
- Franz Maget, de:Franz Maget
- Horst Mahler
- Florian Maier
- Ulrich Maly
- Bernhard Mann
- Erika Mann
- Kaweh Mansoori
- Herbert Marcuse
- Caren Marks
- Bettina Martin
- Dorothee Martin
- Emil Martin
- Ludwig Marum
- Parsa Marvi
- Franz Marx
- Katja Mast
- Christoph Matschie
- Hans Matthöfer
- Max Maurenbrecher
- Ulrich Maurer, Ulrich Maurer
- Gustav Mayer
- Hans Mayer
- Markus Meckel
- Franz Mehring
- Stefan Meier
- Susanne Melior
- Ernst Melsheimer
- Dirk-Ulrich Mende
- Petra Merkel
- Hans Merten
- Robin Mesarosch
- Dagmar Metzger
- Heinz Meyer
- Julius Meyer
- Robert Michels
- Serpil Midyatli
- Matthias Miersch
- Horst Milde
- Susanne Miller
- Thomas Mirow
- Hanka Mittelstädt
- Alexander Mohrenberg
- Dieter Möhrmann
- Alexander Möller
- Claus Möller
- Siemtje Möller
- Falko Mohrs
- Klaus Mohrs, de:Klaus Mohrs
- Hans Mommsen
- Walter Momper
- Edgar Moron
- Johann Most
- Julius Motteler
- Helga Mucke-Wittbrodt
- Erich Mückenberger
- Michael Müller
- Ruth Müller, de:Ruth Müller
- Tamara Müller
- Peter Münstermann
- Franz Müntefering
- Mirjam Müntefering
- Rolf Mützenich
- Oskar Munzinger

== N ==
- Hanna Naber
- Andrea Nahles
- Fritz Naphtali
- Rasha Nasr
- Michael Naumann
- Robert Neddermeyer
- Peter Nellen
- Otto Nerz
- Wolfgang Nešković
- Gustav Neuring
- Paul Nevermann
- Julian Nida-Rümelin
- Ernst Niekisch
- Hans Nimmerfall
- Thomas Nipperdey
- Maria Noichl
- Gustav Noske

== O ==
- Jutta Oesterle-Schwerin
- Paul Oestreich
- Rainer Offergeld
- Vural Öger
- Karl Olfers
- Erich Ollenhauer
- Gerhard Olschewski
- Josephine Ortleb
- Albert Osswald
- Benedikt Oster
- Wilderich Freiherr Ostman von der Leye
- Otto Ostrowski
- Jochen Ott
- Lena Otto
- Mahmut Özdemir
- Aydan Özoguz

== P ==
- Norman Paech
- Fritz Paeplow
- Anton Pannekoek
- Dirk Panter
- Alexander Parvus
- Vallabhbhai Patel
- Peter Paterna
- Ernst Paul
- Christian Paulmann, de:Christian Paulmann
- Alfons Pawelczyk
- Natalie Pawlik
- Christian Pegel
- Karen Pein
- Wolfgang Pepper
- Horst Peter
- Christian Petry
- Detlev Peukert
- Martin Pfaff
- Juliane Pfeil
- Werner Pidde
- Sarah Philipp
- Andreas Philippi
- Wilhelm Pieck
- Willi Piecyk
- Boris Pistorius
- Matthias Platzeck
- Fritz Pleitgen
- Jan Plobner
- Agnes Plum
- Michael Poeschke
- Günther Pohl
- Karl Otto Pöhl
- Käthe Popall
- Lothar Popp
- Claus Peter Poppe
- Franz Pöschl
- Diether Posser
- Achim Post
- Markus Maria Profitlich
- Florian Pronold
- Friedrich Puchta, de:Friedrich Puchta

== R ==
- Heike Raab
- Sascha Raabe
- Ties Rabe
- Maximilian Raber
- Gustav Radbruch
- Karl Radek
- Siegfried Rädel
- Ernst-Wilhelm Rahe
- Christa Randzio-Plath
- Bernhard Rapkay
- Wilhelm Rapp
- Johannes Rau
- Reinhard Rauball
- Lars Rauchfuß
- Philipp Raulfs
- Jaqueline Rauschkolb
- Maria Reese
- Anke Rehlinger
- Reinhold Rehs
- Steffen Reiche
- Bernhard Reichenbach
- Minna Reichert
- Adolf Reichwein
- Carola Reimann
- Hans Reinowski
- Siegfried Reiprich
- Dieter Reiter
- Heribert Reitz
- Johanne Reitze
- Adam Remmele
- Hermann Remmele
- Margot von Renesse
- Annemarie Renger
- Karl Retzlaw
- Edzard Reuter
- Ernst Reuter
- Renate Riemeck
- Isolde Ries
- Walter Riester
- Markus Rinderspacher
- Harald Ringstorff
- Barbara Rinke
- Johannes Ritter
- Moritz Rittinghausen
- Ulrike Rodust
- Dennis Rohde
- Helmut Rohde
- Dieter Rogalla de:Dieter Rogalla (Politiker)
- Elisabeth Röhl
- Klaus Rainer Röhl
- Detlev Karsten Rohwedder
- Walter Romberg
- Gudrun Roos
- Max Roscher
- Julius Rosemann
- Arthur Rosenberg
- Kurt Rosenfeld
- Philip Rosenthal
- Wolfgang Rosenthal
- Lea Rosh
- Rudolf Ross
- Albert Roßhaupter
- Erich Roßmann, de:Erich Roßmann
- Jürgen Roters
- Katharina Roth
- Michael Roth
- Helmut Rothemund, de:Helmut Rothemund
- Dagmar Roth-Behrendt
- Mechtild Rothe
- Philipp Rottwilm
- Frida Rubiner
- Joachim Rücker
- Otto Rühle
- Ortwin Runde
- Bert Rürup
- Ingo Rust
- Sarah Ryglewski

== S ==
- Heinke Salisch
- Willi Sänger
- Thilo Sarrazin
- Senihad Šator
- Karl Schabrod
- Thorsten Schäfer-Gümbel
- Paul Schaffer
- Daniel Schäffner
- Dörte Schall
- Lucia Schanbacher
- Rudolf Scharping
- Harald Schartau, de:Harald Schartau
- Käthe Schaub
- Julius Schaxel
- Hermann Scheer
- Ludwig Scheetz
- Philipp Scheidemann
- Ernst Schellenberg
- Richard Schenck
- Fritz Schenk
- Katharina Schenk
- Henning Scherf
- Michel-Friedrich Schiefler
- Frank Schildt
- Karl Schiller
- Konrad Schily
- Otto Schily
- Max Schippel
- Herbert Schirmer
- Dorothee Schlegel
- Marie Schlei
- Bernhard Schlink
- Volker Schlöndorff
- Albert Schmid, de:Albert Schmid (Politiker, 1945)
- Carlo Schmid
- Eduard Schmid
- Nils Schmid
- Richard Schmid
- Dagmar Schmidt
- Helmut Schmidt
- Johann Schmidt
- Martina Maxi Schmidt
- Renate Schmidt
- Robert Schmidt
- Ulla Schmidt
- Wolfgang Schmidt (born 1934)
- Wolfgang Schmidt (born 1970)
- Adam Schmitt
- Norbert Schmitt
- Jürgen Schmude
- Karl Schnabel
- Carsten Schneider
- Guntram Schneider, de:Guntram Schneider
- Harald Schneider
- Julius Schneider
- Karl Schneider, de:Karl Schneider (Politiker, 1934)
- Karl Heinz Schneider
- Kathrin Schneider
- Peter-Jürgen Schneider
- Torsten Schneider
- Ernst Schneppenhorst
- Ottmar Schreiner
- Erwin Schoettle, de:Erwin Schoettle
- Rudolf Schöfberger
- Adolph Schönfelder
- Gregory Scholz
- Olaf Scholz
- Arnold Schölzel
- Friedrich Schorlemmer
- Stefan Schostok
- Friedrich Schrader
- Carl Schreck
- Albert Schreiner
- Ottmar Schreiner
- Michael Schrodi
- Gerhard Schröder
- Karl Schröder
- Kurt Schröder
- Richard Schröder
- Wilhelm Heinz Schröder
- Louise Schroeder
- Albrecht Schröter
- Maximilian Schröter
- Werner Schröter
- Hermann Schubert
- Katina Schubert
- Helga Schuchardt
- Manja Schüle
- Manfred Schüler
- Albert Schulz
- Heinrich Schulz
- Martin Schulz
- Oskar Schulz
- Peter Schulz
- Svenja Schulze
- Kurt Schumacher
- Joachim Schuster
- Stefan Schuster
- Werner Schuster
- Klaus Schütz
- Frank Schwabe
- Gesine Schwan
- Rolf Schwanitz
- Ernst Schwarz
- Thomas Schwarz
- Rita Schwarzelühr-Sutter
- Alexander Schweitzer
- Hans Schweitzer
- Manuela Schwesig
- Tino Schwierzina
- Kurt Schwitters
- Gerhart Seger
- Martin Segitz
- Elisabeth Selbert
- Erwin Sellering
- Carl Severing
- Max Seydewitz
- Christin Siebel
- Wiard Siebels
- Carsten Sieling
- Max Sievers
- Robert Siewert
- Viviane Sigg
- Anna Simon
- Günter Simon
- Peter Simon
- Barbara Simons
- Heide Simonis
- Paul Singer
- Hugo Sinzheimer
- Birgit Sippel
- Olga Sippl
- Damhat Sisamci
- Gustav Sobottka
- Fritz Soldmann
- Wilhelm Sollmann
- Brigitte Somfleth
- Daniela Sommer
- Paul Spiegel
- Alfons Spielhoff
- Dieter Spöri
- Klaus Staeck
- Ingrid Stahmer
- Iris Stalzer
- Wolfgang Stammberger
- Dorothee Stapelfeldt
- Karl Starzacher
- Daniela Stauch
- Hans Staudinger
- Erwin Staudt
- Johann Stegner
- Ralf Stegner
- Markus Stein
- Nico Steinbach
- Peer Steinbrück
- Karl Steinhoff
- Fritz Steinhoff
- Otto Steinmayer, de:Otto Steinmayer
- Frank-Walter Steinmeier
- Jutta Steinruck
- Laura Stellbrink
- Johannes Stelling
- Harald Stelljes, de:Harald Stelljes
- Carola Stern
- Martin Stevens, de:Martin Stevens
- Anna Stiegler
- Ludwig Stiegler
- Andreas Stoch
- Christian Stock
- Ulrich Stockmann
- Karl Wilhelm Stolle
- Manfred Stolpe
- Richard Stöss
- Otto Strasser
- Dietrich Stobbe
- Andreas Stoch
- Rita Streb-Hesse, de:Rita Streb-Hesse
- Christine Streichert-Clivot
- Janina Strelow
- Heinrich Ströbel
- Käte Strobel
- Hans-Christian Ströbele
- Peter Struck
- Otto Suhr
- Hinrich Swieter
- Stefan Szende

== T ==
- Rainer Tabillion, de:Rainer Tabillion
- Alfred Tacke
- Fritz Tarnow
- Arif Taşdelen, de:Arif Taşdelen
- Johanna Tesch
- Silke Tesch
- August Thalheimer
- Bertha Thalheimer
- Ernst Thälmann
- Moritz Thape, de:Moritz Thape
- Matthias Theisen
- Wolfgang Thierse
- Wolfgang Tiefensee
- Rona Tietje
- Ernst Tillich
- Angela Tillmann
- Sarah Timmann
- Ernst Torgler
- Carl Wilhelm Tölcke
- Ferdinand Tönnies
- Klaus Toppmöller
- Karl Trabalski
- Carsten Träger
- Heinrich Trinowitz
- Heinrich Troeger
- Tassilo Tröscher, de:Tassilo Tröscher
- Peter Tschentscher
- Derya Türk-Nachbaur
- Philipp Türmer

== U ==
- Christian Ude
- Sabine Uecker
- Fred Uhlmann
- Ernst Uhrlau
- Walter Ulbricht
- Annika Urbanski

== V ==
- Egon Vaupel
- Carola Veit
- Günter Verheugen
- Heinz Oskar Vetter
- Hans Vogel
- Hans-Jochen Vogel
- Franz Vogt
- Roland Vogt
- Ute Vogt
- Marja-Liisa Völlers
- Georg von Vollmar
- Wolfgang Völz
- Emily Vontz
- Henning Voscherau
- Thomas von der Vring

== W ==
- Albert Wagner, de:Albert Wagner (Politiker)
- Falk Wagner
- Hans-Georg Wagner
- Manfred Wagner
- Kathrin Wahlmann
- Willi Waike
- Eduard Wald
- Orli Wald
- Gerd Walter
- Jürgen Walter
- Ralf Walter
- Norbert Walter-Borjans
- Alma Wartenberg
- Alfred Weber
- Klaus Wedemeier
- Friedrich Wehmer
- Herbert Wehner
- Stephan Weil
- Barbara Weiler
- Marius Weiß
- Gert Weisskirchen
- Ernst Ulrich von Weizsäcker
- Jakob von Weizsäcker
- Otto Wels
- Ernst Welteke
- Rainer Wend
- Georg Wendt
- Paul Wengert
- Helene Wessel
- Paul Wessel
- Hans Westermann
- Friedrich Westmeyer
- Heinz Westphal
- Thomas Westphal
- Heidemarie Wieczorek-Zeul
- Wolfgang Wiegard
- Eugen von der Wiesche
- Dirk Wiese
- Christoph Willeke
- Armin Willingmann
- Reinhard Wilmbusse
- Thomas Wimmer
- Heinrich August Winkler
- Heike Winzent
- Christine Wischer
- Babette Winter
- Ernst Winter
- Rudolf Winter
- Hans-Jürgen Wischnewski
- Rudolf Wissell
- Wolfgang Wodarg
- Tiemo Wölken
- Dietmar Woidke
- Sven Wolf
- Annemarie Wolff
- Dunja Wolff
- Fritz Wolffheim
- Rosi Wolfstein
- Tim Wook
- Klaus Wowereit
- Heidemarie Wright
- Monika Wulf-Mathies
- Hans Wunderlich
- Mathilde Wurm
- Emil Wutzky

== Y ==
- Ibrahim Yetim
- Gülistan Yüksel
- Serdar Yüksel
- Turgut Yüksel
- Andrea Ypsilanti

== Z ==
- Fred Zander, [[:de:Fred Zander]]
- Uta Zapf
- Wolfgang Zeidler
- Erich Zeigner
- Clara Zetkin
- Anna Ziegler
- Maximilian Ziegler
- Jörg Ziercke
- Luise Zietz
- Hermann Zimmer
- Edwin Zimmermann
- Charlotte Zinke
- Georg August Zinn
- Armand Zorn
- Fritz Zubeil
- Brigitte Zypries
