= Heinrich Schulz =

Heinrich Schulz may refer to:

- Heinrich Schulz (assassin) (1893–1979), German officer and political assassin
- Heinrich Schulz (politician) (1872–1932), German politician and educational reformer
- Heinrich E. M. Schulz (1859–1918), German entomologist

== See also ==
- Heinrich Schultz (1924–2012), Estonian cultural functionary
- Heinrich Schulz-Beuthen (1838–1915), composer
