= Albert Schultz (disambiguation) =

Albert Schultz (born 1963) is a Canadian actor and director. Albert Schultz may also refer to:

- Alby Schultz (1939–2015), Australian politician
- Albert Schultz (basketballer) (1913–2008), Estonian basketballer

== See also ==
- Albert Schulz (1802–1893), German writer on mediaeval literature
- Al Schulz (1889–1931), American baseball player
- Franz Albert Schultz (1692–1763), Prussian divine and superintendent
