= Alfons Spielhoff =

German politician

- Born: 3 July 1912; Essen, Germany
- Died: 9 December 1987 (aged 75)
- Education: Foreign Science
- Alma mater: University of Berlin
- Occupation: Cultural Commissioner
- Years active: 1951–1987
- Employer: City of Dortmund
- Known for: Initiating new cultural policy in the Federal Republic in the 1970s
- Notable work: Advocacy for decentralized cultural work in suburbs and socio-cultural scenes
- Political party: Social Democratic Party of Germany (SPD)
- Awards: In Dortmund, the "Alfons-Spielhoff-Platz" is named after him

Alfons Spielhoff (3 July 1912 – 9 December 1987) was a Cultural Commissioner of Dortmund.

He gained nationwide recognition as one of the initiators of a new cultural policy in the Federal Republic of the 1970s. Under his motto "cultural policy is social policy", he advocated for decentralized cultural work in suburbs and socio-cultural scenes. His initiative to abandon the Philharmonic Orchestra and to repurpose the new, representative opera house led to fierce disputes and demonstrations in Dortmund.

== Life ==
Alfons Spielhoff was born on 3 July 1912 in Essen. He grew up in the Youth Movement, after 1933 he was in the Hitler Youth. He studied foreign science in Berlin, but after obtaining his diploma, he was denied his doctorate due to being imprisoned twice by the Gestapo. As a soldier, he was sentenced in 1944 for Wehrkraftzersetzung and imprisoned in Toulon, but was able to desert. Until the summer of 1945, he was a prisoner of war in France.

In 1950, Spielhoff received his doctorate on the subject of his dissertation "Technology as a Problem of Cultural Science". Since 1951, Spielhoff was engaged in the SPD, the GEW, the German Peace Society (DFG) and since the 1960s also in the Humanist Union. From 1958 to 1959, he was chairman of the Working Community of German Peace Associations and from 1962 to 1974 Cultural Commissioner of the City of Dortmund.

== Policy ==
As a member of the Cultural Committee of the German Association of Cities and the Tariff Committee of the German Theater Association, Spielhoff campaigned against the concentration of the city's cultural budgets in a few representative areas, above all the theatres. Due to the constant increase in personnel costs in this area, he feared a blockade of all other cultural activities. Therefore, as Dortmund's Cultural Commissioner, he advocated in 1973 for an abandonment of the Philharmonic Orchestra and a reorganization of the remaining areas of the Dortmund City Theater. Many of his ideas developed in this context were only implemented much later and elsewhere, such as his proposal to run the theater as a limited liability company according to business principles, or his proposal to establish a commercial branch in the field of light music and musicals. Spielhoff's closure plans were rejected by the City Council of Dortmund in 1974.

Spielhoff continued his commitment to socio-cultural issues nationwide, including in the Cultural Policy Society (Kulturpolitische Gesellschaft). In Dortmund, the systematic promotion of the free cultural scene and district cultural work did not start until the 1980s.

== Honors ==
In Dortmund, the "Alfons-Spielhoff-Platz" is named after him, where the independent theater Fletch Bizzel is located.
