= Robert Fischer (unionist) =

German politician (1883 – c. 1945)

Robert Fischer (born 22 August 1883 in Lüdenscheid; missing in 1945 in Königsberg) was a notable German unionist and social democratic politician (Social Democratic Party of Germany).

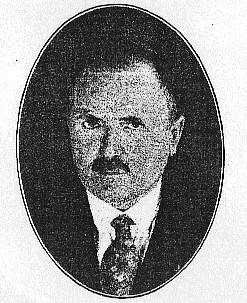

After an elementary education he completed an apprenticeship as metal processor and pursued this trade until 1906.

From 1906 to 1911 he was the chief executive officer of the regional branch of the German Metalworkers' Union (Deutscher Metallarbeiterverband) in Lüdenscheid. In this time he was also a worker's secretary and agitation leader of the Social Democratic Party of Germany (SPD) in Lüdenscheid. From 1911 to 1919 he was chief executive officer of the Metalworkers Union in Bremerhaven and on the board of directors of the local Consumers' Co-operative from 1914 onwards. In 1919 he was again chief executive officer of the regional branch of the Metalworkers Union in Lüdenscheid and officially to 20 July 1925 a member of the City Council Lüdenscheid. An uncompleted strike in November 1923 was regarded as a failure by Fischer and as an internal union consequence he gave up his post in Lüdenscheid. He then became a managing director of the Metalworkers Union in Elbing at the Baltic Sea. He was later director of the State Employment Agency (Arbeitsamt) in Königsberg, until he was relieved of his office in 1933 by the National Socialist German Workers Party (NSDAP).

Fischer represented the social democratic politicians and activists of the trade-unionism, who abolished the German Imperial Monarchy (Deutsches Kaiserreich) and established the first parliamentarian German Republic, known as the Weimar Republic or officially as Deutsches Reich. Fischer was a victim of the Nazis' terrorism in his professional life and most likely the Nazi regime was responsible for his death in 1945.

He was also a journalist for the party and union press.

== See also ==
- List of Social Democratic Party of Germany members
