= Jutta Oesterle-Schwerin =

German politician (born 1941)

Member of the Bundestag
- In office 1987–1990

Personal details
- Born: 25 February 1941 (age 85) Jerusalem, Mandatory Palestine
- Party: Alliance '90/The Greens

Jutta Oesterle-Schwerin (born 25 February 1941) is a German politician, representative of the Social Democratic Party and later in life of Alliance '90/The Greens. She is the sister of Israeli historian Tom Segev.

== Life ==
Born and raised in Jerusalem to Jewish refugees from Germany, Oesterle-Schwerin's father Heinz Schwerin was killed in the 1948 Arab–Israeli War, and her mother Ricarda was a photographer. She studied Interior design in Stuttgart and graduated in 1969, and in 1974 became a member of Social Democratic Party (SPD). In 1980, (NATO Double-Track Decision), she left German party SPD and became 1983 a member of German party Alliance '90/The Greens. From 1987 to 1990 she was member of German Bundestag for Alliance '90/The Greens. On 28 November 1989, she objected to German reunification, stating that there was not a single sensible reason for German unity. Until 2008 Oesterle-Schwerin worked as a freelance architect in Berlin. She is a lesbian.

== See also ==
- List of Social Democratic Party of Germany politicians
