= Heinrich Trinowitz =

German unionist and politician

Heinrich August Trinowitz (born 20 May 1879 in Fichthorst; died 10 January 1929 in Königsberg was a notable German unionist and social democratic politician (Social Democratic Party of Germany).

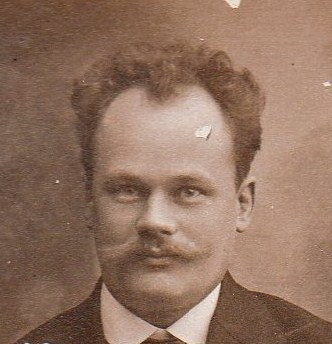

After a very sad and joyless childhood he was educated at the Knabenschule Elbing. Then he completed an apprenticeship as a cabinet maker and pursued this trade until 1911.

From 1906 to 1911, he was a member on the board of directors of the local sickness-fund for cabinetmakers (Ortskrankenkasse der Tischler). Furthermore he was the chairman of the local branch of the German Woodworkers Association (Deutscher Holzarbeiter-Verband) as well as a member of the Industrial Court at Elbing from 1909 to 1911.

After that Trinowitz was from 1911 to 1919 the Union Official (Gewerkschaftssekretär) for the Branch at Tilsit. In 1919 he was appointed as District Manager (Gauvorsteher) of the large district of East Prussia of the German Woodworkers Association until his death in 1929. His post was Tilsit until 1926 and then Königsberg). In the years 1912, 1922 and 1925 Trinowitz was delegate at the German labour union congresses of the wood workers.

Trinowitz was, from 1919 to 1921, Member of the Prussian House of Representatives (Preußischer Landtag). In addition, he was, from 1919 to 1925, Member of the City Council of Tilsit as well as a member of the provisional German Council on Economic Affairs (Reichswirtschaftsrat) as a representative of the trades' workers from 1921 until 1929.

In Tilsit Trinowitz was also the chairman of the local Social Democratic Party of Germany's Council of Education as well as a member on the board of directors of the local Consumers' Co-operative from 1914 to 1926. He was deemed unfit for military service in World War I because of a work related accident as cabinetmaker, which caused the loss of his right thumb. Prior to World War I, he encountered difficulties with the police by defamation of Emperor Wilhelm II in a public speech.

Heinrich August Trinowitz represented the social democratic politicians and activists of the trade-unionism, who abolished the German Imperial Monarchy (Deutsches Kaiserreich) and established the first parliamentarian German Republic, known as the Weimar Republic or officially as Deutsches Reich.

Also, he was a journalist for the party and union press.

== See also ==
- List of Social Democratic Party of Germany members
