= Hans Reinowski =

German politician (1900-1977)

Hans Reinowski (January 28, 1900 in Bernburg – January 3, 1977 in Darmstadt), was a German journalist, writer and politician, representative of the Social Democratic Party. He was the author of the brochure "Terror in Braunschweig", published in Zürich in 1933.

== See also ==
- List of Social Democratic Party of Germany politicians
