= Helmut Kasimier =

German politician

Finance Minister of Lower Saxony
- In office 1974–1976

Member of Parliament (the Landtag) of Lower Saxony
- In office 1963–1986

Personal details
- Born: 17 October 1926 Breslau
- Died: April 16, 2013 (aged 86) Hannover)

Helmut Kasimier (17 October 1926 in Breslau – 16 April 2013 in Hannover) was a German politician, representative of the Social Democratic Party. Kasimier was a Member of Parliament (the Landtag) of Lower Saxony from 1963 to 1986, during which he was the Chairman of the SDP faction in the parliament from 1967 to 1974 and Finance Minister of Lower Saxony from 1974 to 1976.

== See also ==
- List of Social Democratic Party of Germany politicians

Political offices
Preceded by Siegfried Heinke	Finance Minister of Lower Saxony; 1974 – 1976	Succeeded by Walther Leisler Kiep
Preceded by Wilhelm Baumgarten	Chairman of the Social Democratic Party in Lower Saxony; 1967 – 1974	Succeeded by Bernhard Kreibohm
