= Benedikt Oster =

German politician (born 1988)

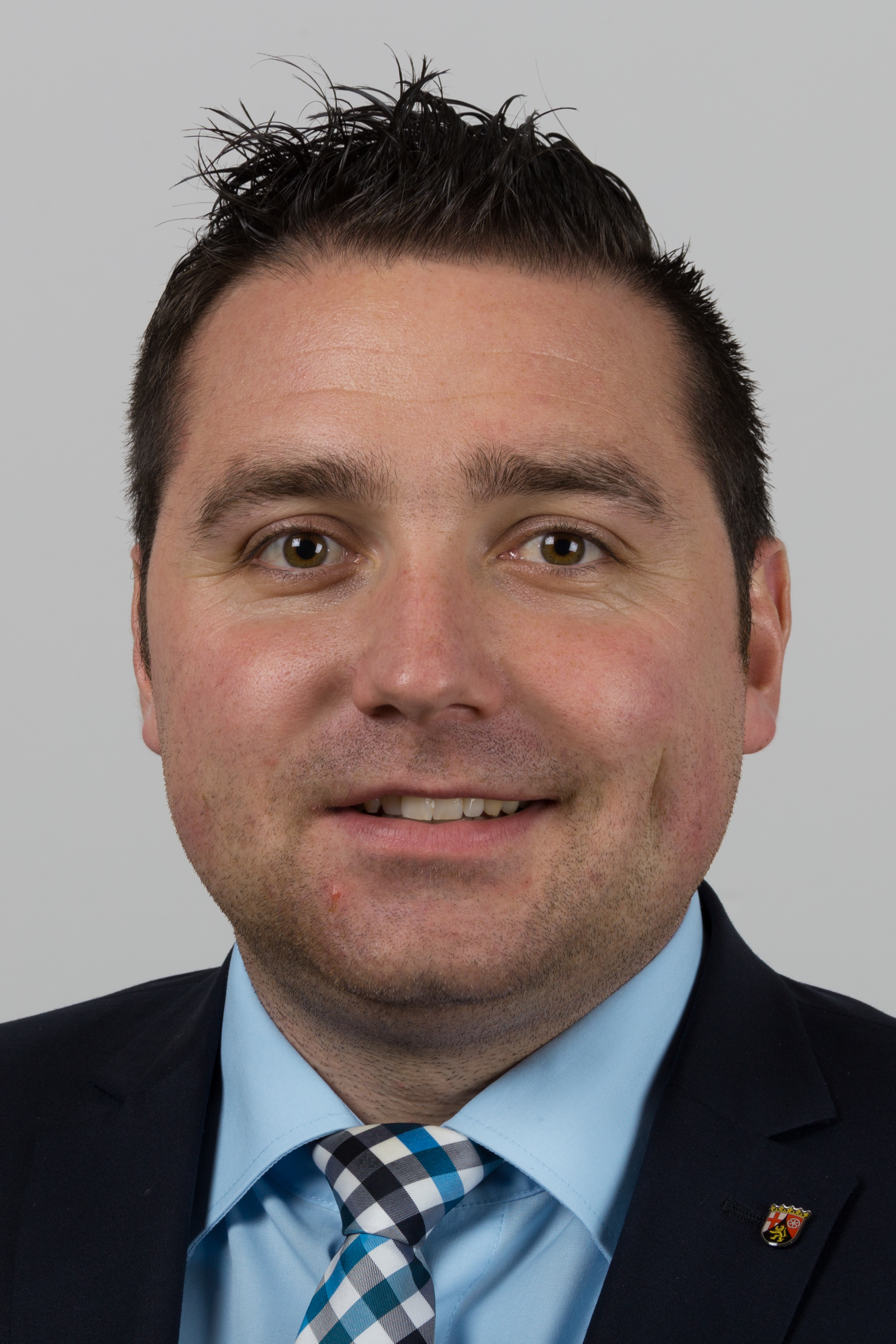
- Oster in 2016

Member of the Landtag of Rhineland-Palatinate
- Incumbent
- Assumed office 18 May 2011
- Preceded by: Heike Raab

Personal details
- Born: 7 July 1988 (age 37) Koblenz
- Party: Social Democratic Party

Benedikt Oster (born 7 July 1988 in Koblenz) is a German politician serving as a member of the Landtag of Rhineland-Palatinate since 2011. He has served as chairman of the Social Democratic Party in Cochem-Zell since 2017.
