= Werner Pidde =

German politician

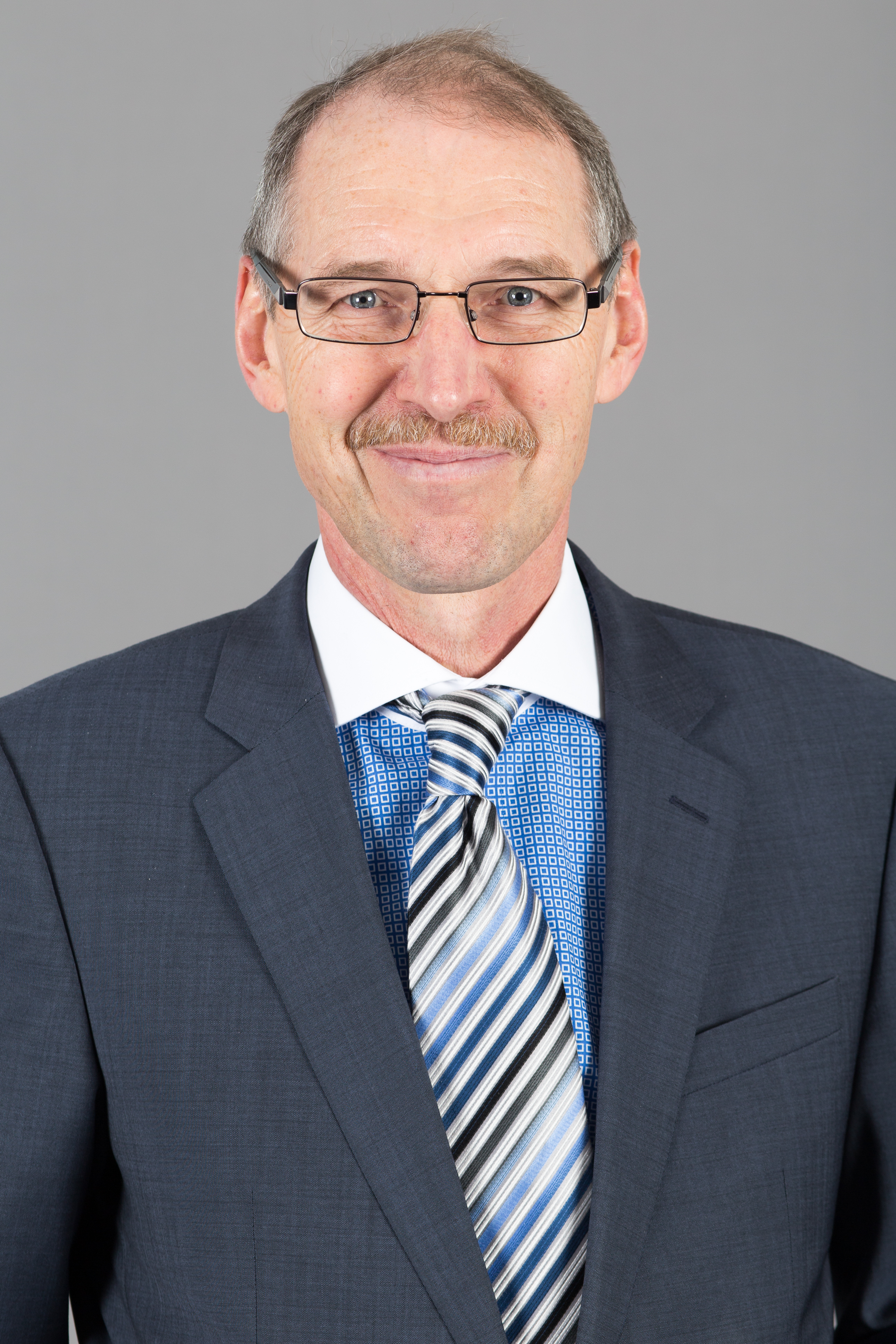
Werner Pidde

Werner Pidde (born 28 July 1953 in Waltershausen) is a German politician. He is a member of the Social Democratic Party's delegation in the Landtag of Thuringia since 1994.

== See also ==
- List of Social Democratic Party of Germany politicians
