= Falk Wagner =

German politician (born 1989)

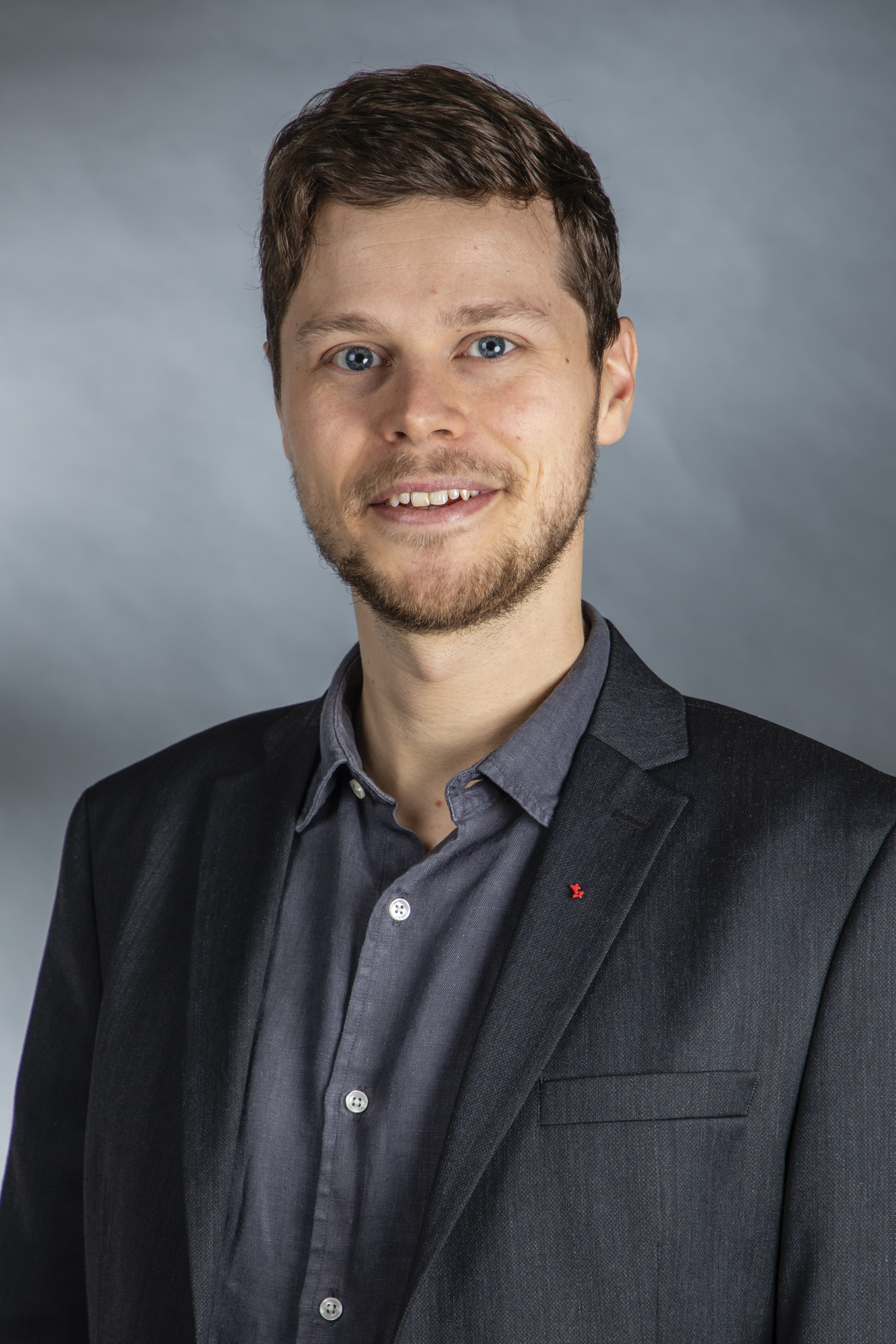
- Wagner in 2019

Member of the Bürgerschaft of Bremen
- Incumbent
- Assumed office 8 June 2019

Personal details
- Born: 16 June 1989 (age 36)
- Party: Social Democratic Party (since 2004)

Falk-Constantin Wagner (born 16 June 1989 in Hamburg) is a German politician serving as a member of the Bürgerschaft of Bremen since 2019. He has served as chairman of the Social Democratic Party in Bremen since 2024.
