= Senihad Šator =

German politician (born 1996)

Member of the Bürgerschaft of Bremen
- Incumbent
- Assumed office 29 June 2023

Personal details
- Born: 28 May 1996 (age 29)
- Party: Social Democratic Party

Senihad Šator (born 28 May 1996) is a German politician serving as a member of the Bürgerschaft of Bremen since 2023. He has served as chairman of the Jugendwerk der Arbeiterwohlfahrt since 2022.
