= Stefan Fulst-Blei =

German politician (born 1968)

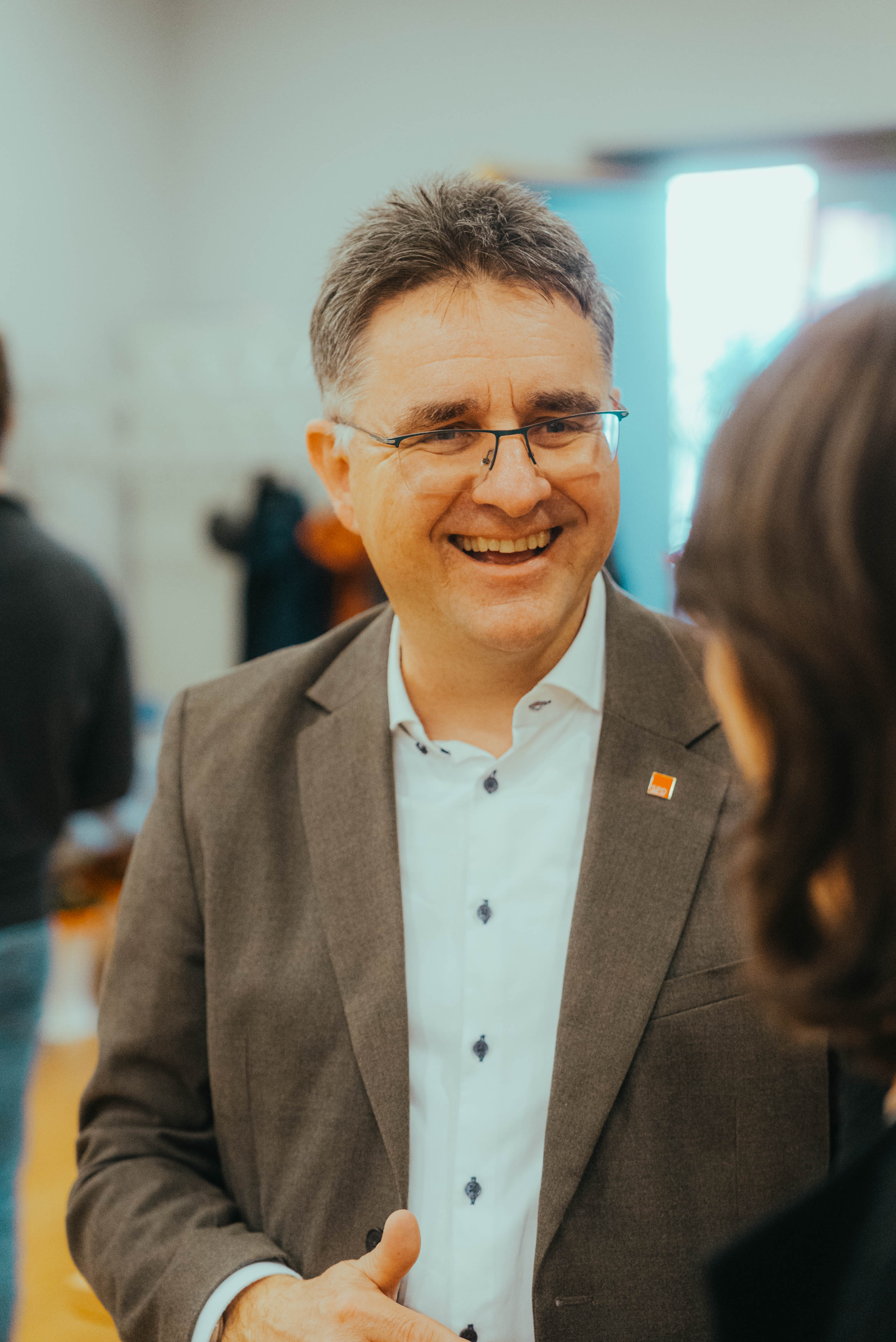
- Fulst-Blei in 2025

Member of the Landtag of Baden-Württemberg
- Incumbent
- Assumed office 12 April 2011
- Constituency: Mannheim I

Personal details
- Born: 7 June 1968 (age 57) Mannheim
- Party: Social Democratic Party

Stefan Fulst-Blei (born 7 June 1968 in Mannheim) is a German politician serving as a member of the Landtag of Baden-Württemberg since 2011. He has served as deputy group leader of the Social Democratic Party since 2016.
