= Volkan Baran =

German politician (born 1978)

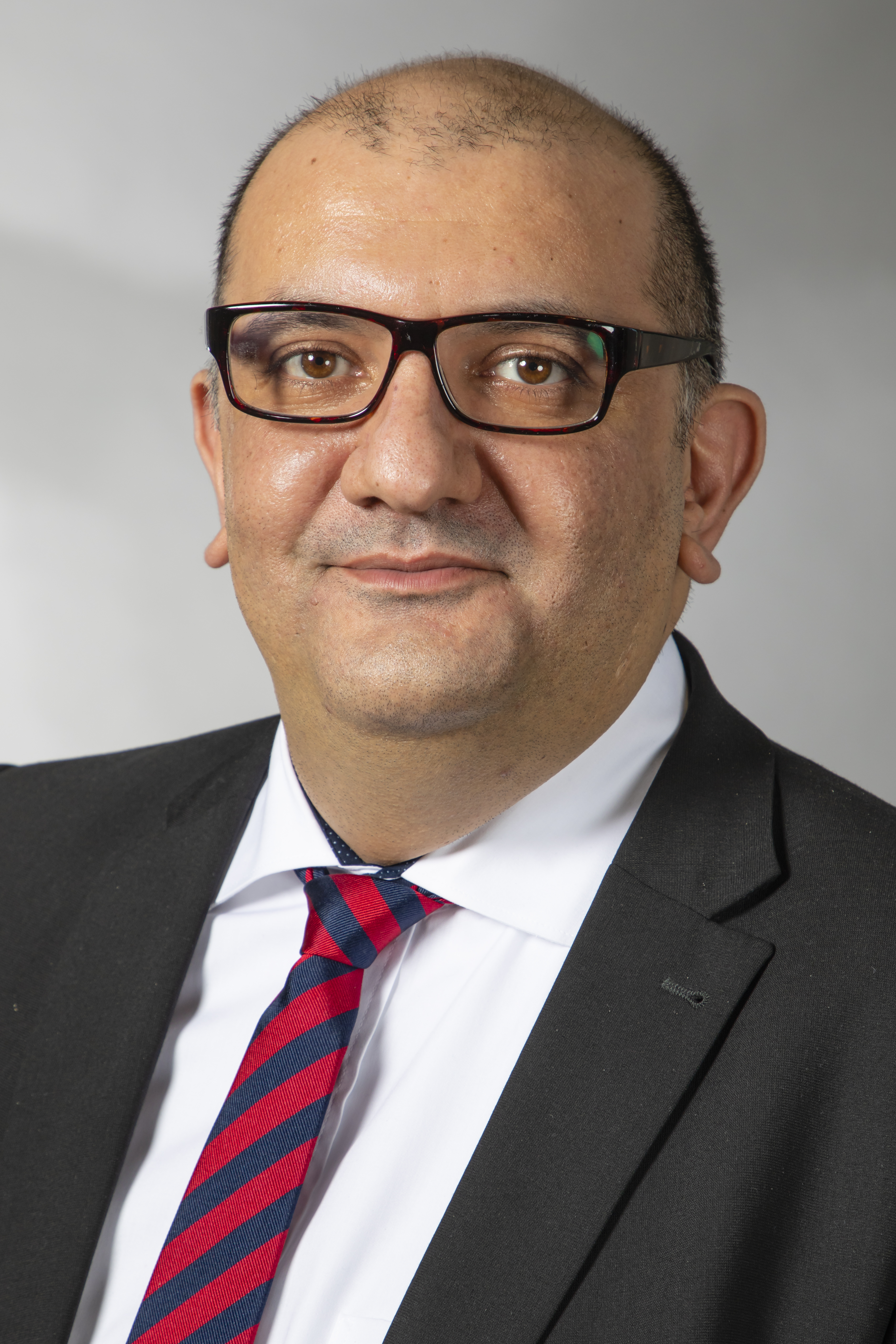
- Baran in 2019

Member of the Landtag of North Rhine-Westphalia
- Incumbent
- Assumed office 1 June 2017
- Preceded by: Gerda Kieninger
- Constituency: Dortmund II

Personal details
- Born: 12 August 1978 (age 47)
- Party: Social Democratic Party (since 2004)

Volkan Baran (born 12 August 1978) is a German politician serving as a member of the Landtag of North Rhine-Westphalia since 2017. He has served as treasurer of the Social Democratic Party in Dortmund since 2019.
