= Ute Berg =

German politician (born 1953)

Ute Berg (born 24 July 1953 in Essen) is a German politician and member of the SPD. She graduated from the University of Göttingen in 1974 in Political Science.

Since 2011 Berg has been the head of the economic analysis department for the city of Cologne.
