= Maximilian Ziegler =

German politician (born 1992)

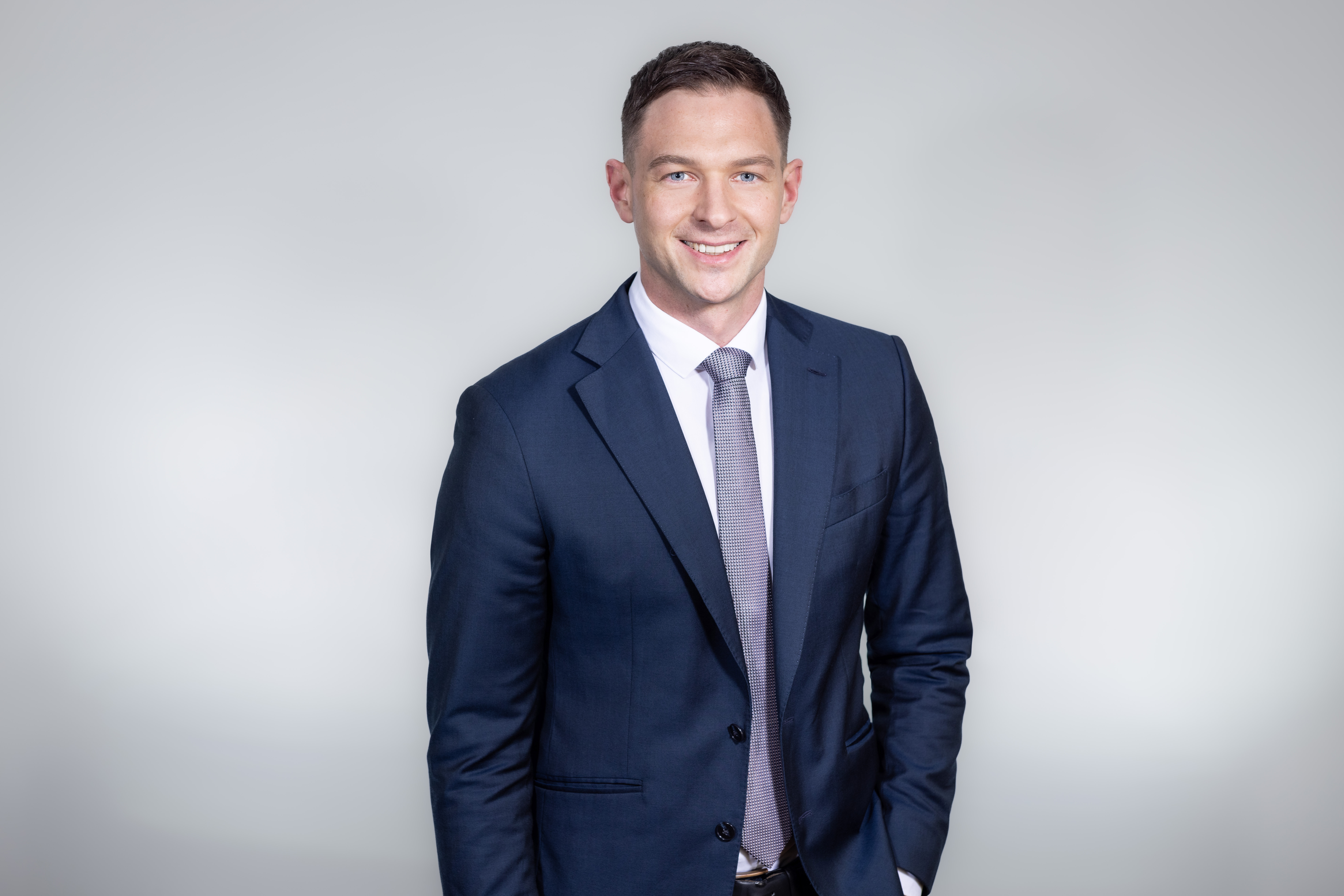
- Ziegler in 2024

Member of the Landtag of Hesse
- Incumbent
- Assumed office 18 January 2024

Personal details
- Born: 1992 (age 33–34)
- Party: Social Democratic Party (since 2015)

Maximilian Ziegler (born 1992) is a German politician serving as a member of the Landtag of Hesse since 2024. He has been a member of the Social Democratic Party since 2015.
