= Marius Weiß =

German politician (born 1975)

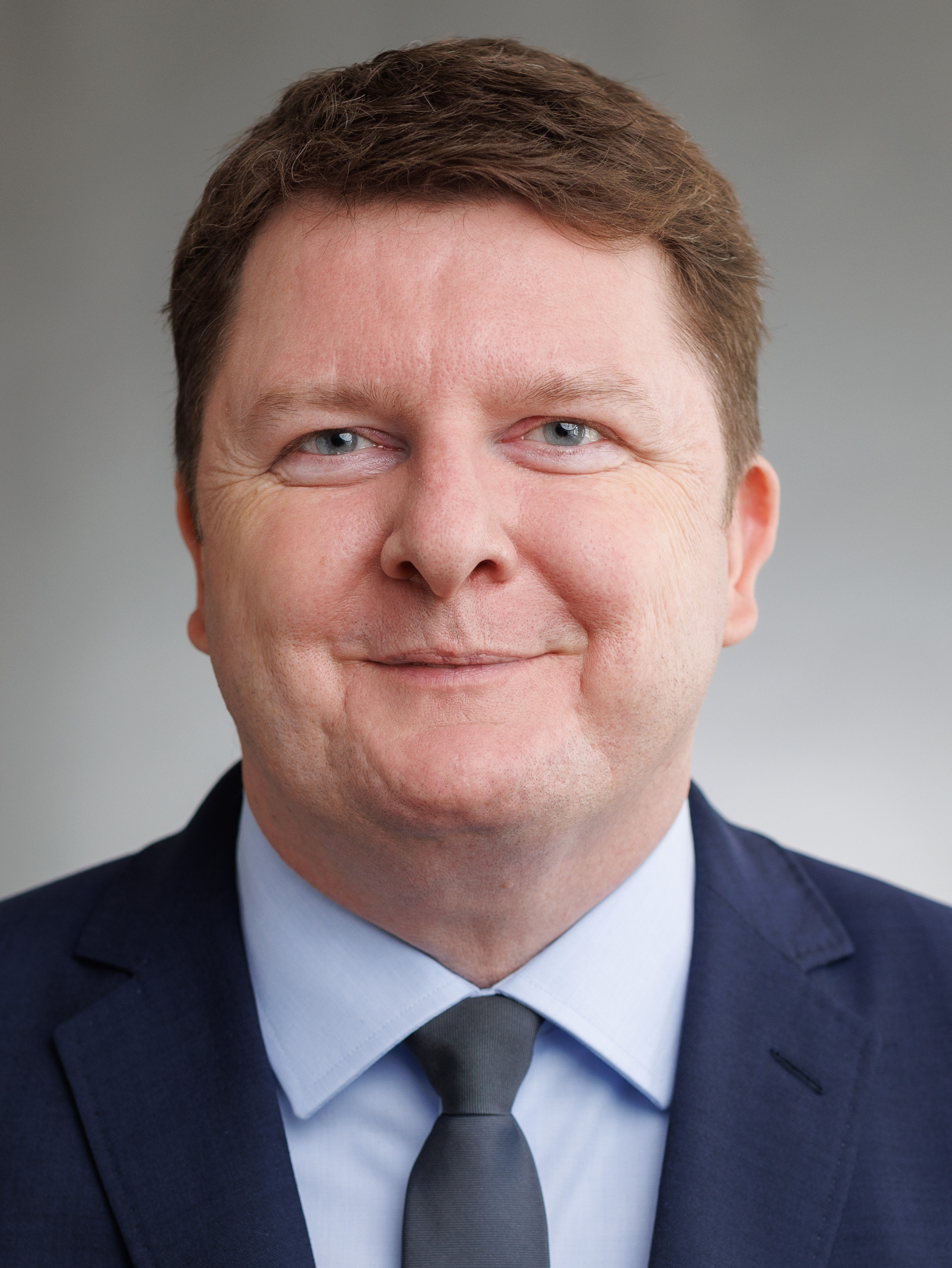
- Weiß in 2022

Member of the Landtag of Hesse
- Incumbent
- Assumed office 5 April 2008

Personal details
- Born: 3 March 1975 (age 51)
- Party: Social Democratic Party (since 1997)

Marius Weiß (born 3 March 1975) is a German politician serving as a member of the Landtag of Hesse since 2008. He has served as chairman of the Social Democratic Party in Rheingau-Taunus since 2017.
