= Christel Hoffmann =

German theater scholar, dramaturge and pedagogue

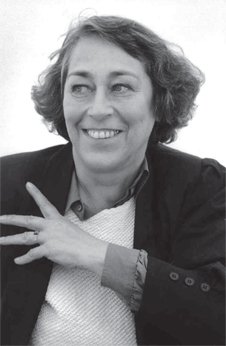
Christel Hoffmann

Christel Hoffmann (born 19 April 1936 in Burkau, Germany) is a German theater scholar, dramaturge and pedagogue.

== Life and career ==
After studying drama at the Theaterhochschule in Leipzig (1954–1958), she worked as a dramaturge at the Landestheater Neustrelitz and at the Städtische Bühnen Leipzig. In the 1960s and 1970s she was the chief dramaturg of the Theater der Freundschaft (known today as the Theater an der Parkaue), the main children’s theater in East Berlin. She received her PhD at Humboldt University Berlin in 1973 with a dissertation on the history and historical predecessors of the theater for children and youth in the GDR. In the early 1980s, she left the Theater der Freundschaft and became the chief professional adviser for theater with children at the Pionierpalast Berlin, i.e. she switched from theater for children to theater with children as part of pedagogy. After 1986, she worked as a researcher at the International Office of the Theater for Children and Youth of the GDR, and became the last director of the GDR branch of the ASSITEJ. From 1990 to 2001 she was a researcher at the Center for Children’s and Youth Theater of the Federal Republic of Germany and the director of its Berlin office.

From 1990 to 1994 she taught at the Berlin University of the Arts and from 1994 to 2013 at the Zurich University of the Arts. From 2001 to 2016 she was a professor at the Institute for Theater Pedagogy at the Osnabrück University of Applied Sciences. From 1993 to 1995 she was the artistic director of the Theatertreffen der Jugend in Berlin. In addition, she co-organized a number of theater festivals, including the "Internationale Regieseminar für Kinder- und Jugendtheater" and the "Spurensuche - Treffen Freier Kinder- und Jugendtheater". She also gave workshops in Germany and around the world, for example for the Goethe-Institut, on the method of theater for children and youth as well as on Bertolt Brecht’s epic theater.

In 2001, Hoffmann received the status of Honorary Professor at the Institute for Theater Pedagogy at the Osnabrück University of Applied Sciences. In 2012, Hoffman was honored with the Golden Mask given by the German Amateur Theater Association (German: Bund Deutscher Amateurtheater (BDAT)) for her work with children's theater. In 2017, she received the Applause for Lifetime Achievement Award from the International Association of Theater for Children and Youth (German: Internationalen Vereinigung des Theaters für Kinder und Jugendliche) in Cape Town, South Africa.

== Selected publications ==
- Theater für Junge Zuschauer, Akademieverlag Berlin 1976.
- Kinder- und Jugendtheater der Welt, Henschelverlag Berlin 1978, 2nd Edition. 1984.
- Die Pfosten sind, die Bretter aufgeschlagen ... Theater von Aischylos bis Brecht, Kinderbuchverlag Berlin 1984, 2nd Edition. 1988.
- Spielen und Theaterspielen, Kinderbuchverlag Berlin 1989, New edition: Deutscher Theaterverlag 2009.
- Theater spielen mit Kindern und Jugendlichen. Konzepte, Methoden & Übungen, Juventa Verlag Weinheim and München 1999, 2nd Edition. 2004. (Edited with Annett Israel)
- Spiel.raum.theater. Aufsätze, Reden und Anmerkungen zum Theater für junge Zuschauer und zur Kunst des Darstellenden Spiels, Peter Lang Verlag Frankfurt am Main, 2006.
- Seit 1998 Herausgeberin der Arbeitshefte zum Kinder- und Jugendtheater. Schriftenreihe des Kinder- und Jugendtheaterzentrums in der Bundesrepublik Deutschland. Frankfurt am Main.
- Horst Hawemann - Leben üben: Improvisationen und Notate, Theater der Zeit Berlin 2014. (Edited in cooperation with the Ernst Busch Academy of Dramatic Arts and ASSITEJ Germany)
