= Julia Barth-Dworzynski =

German politician (born 1995)

Member of the Hamburg Parliament
- Incumbent
- Assumed office 18 March 2020

Personal details
- Born: 8 July 1995 (age 30)
- Party: Social Democratic Party (since 2010)

Julia Barth-Dworzynski (née Barth; born 8 July 1995) is a German politician serving as a member of the Hamburg Parliament since 2020. She has been a member of the Social Democratic Party since 2010.
