= Mustafa Güngör (politician) =

German politician (born 1978)

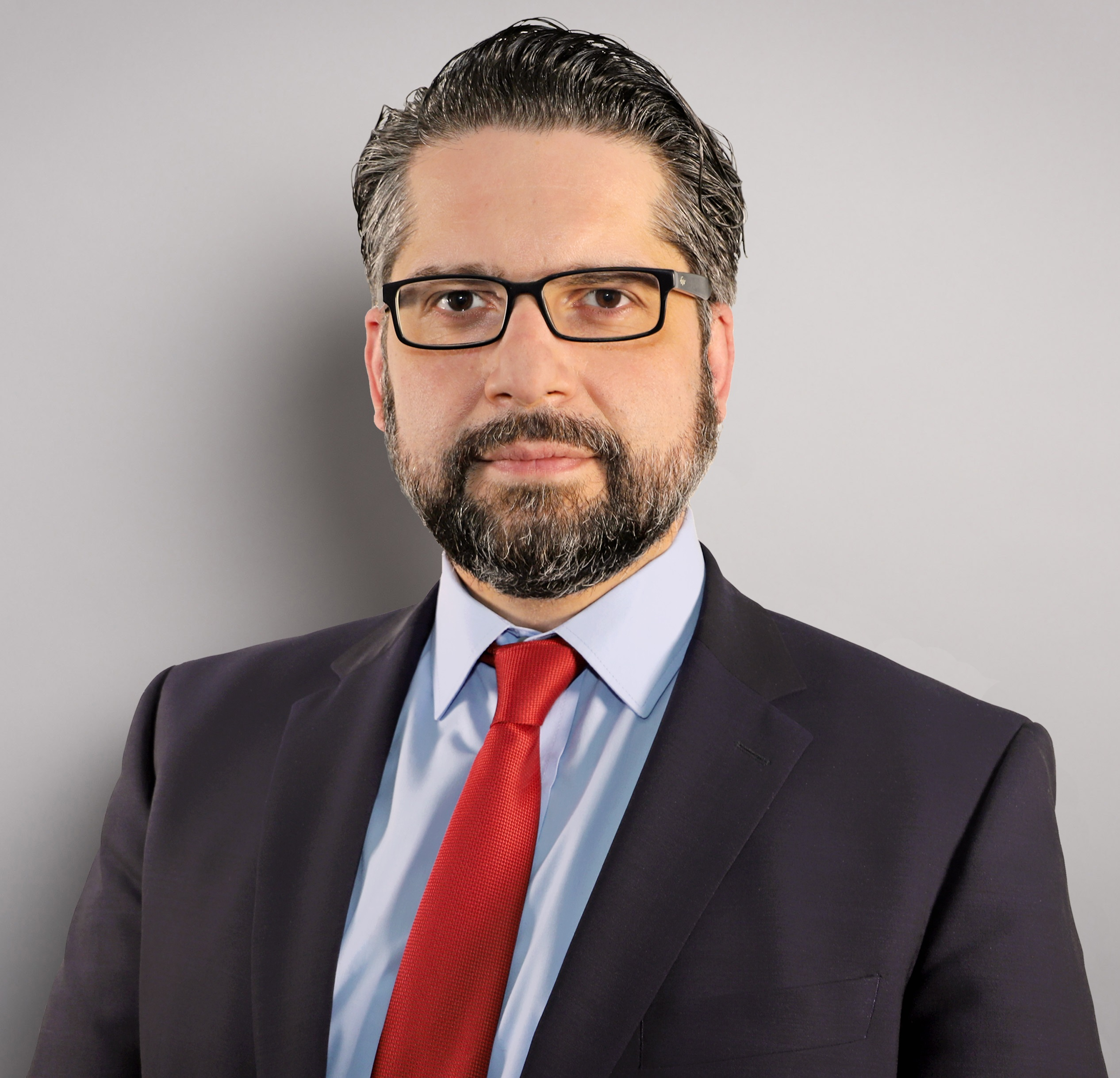
- Güngör in 2021

Member of the Bürgerschaft of Bremen
- Incumbent
- Assumed office 28 June 2007

Personal details
- Born: 20 March 1978 (age 48)
- Party: Social Democratic Party (since 2000)

Mustafa Güngör (born 20 March 1978) is a German politician serving as a member of the Bürgerschaft of Bremen since 2007. He has served as group leader of the Social Democratic Party since 2019.
