= Ulrich Maurer (politician) =

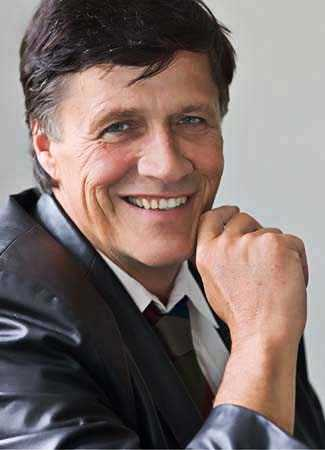

Member of the Bundestag for Baden-Württemberg
- In office 2005–2013

Deputy Chairman of the Left Party parliamentary group
- In office October 2009 – 2013

Parliamentary Business Manager of the Left Party parliamentary group
- In office 2005 – October 2009

Personal details
- Born: November 29, 1948 (age 77) Stuttgart, West Germany
- Party: The Left (since 2005)
- Spouse: Christine Rudolf
- Children: 2
- Education: University of Tübingen
- Occupation: Lawyer, politician

Ulrich Maurer (born 29 November 1948 in Stuttgart) is a German lawyer and politician. He was originally a member of the Social Democratic Party (SPD) before joining the WASG in 2005 and subsequently Die Linke. He served as a member of the Landtag of Baden-Württemberg from 1980 to 2005 and as a member of the Bundestag from 2005 to 2013.

== Early life and education ==
Maurer was born in Stuttgart, the son of a technical employee and a saleswoman; his father died when Maurer was four years old. He attended school in Stuttgart through to his Abitur in 1966, completed 18 months of military service, and then studied law at the University of Tübingen, where he was active in the student government (AStA). He passed his first state law examination in 1974 and his second (Assessorexamen) in 1977, after which he worked as a self-employed lawyer in Stuttgart.

== Political career ==
Maurer joined the SPD in 1969. He was a member of the Stuttgart city council from 1971 to 1980. In April 1980 he was elected to the Landtag of Baden-Württemberg, where he served until October 2005. Within the SPD he chaired the Baden-Württemberg state party organisation from 1987 to 1999, and led the SPD's Landtag group in Baden-Württemberg from 1992 to 2001. At the federal level, he was a member of the SPD federal executive committee from 1990 to 2003 and sat on the party's presidium in 1995–1999 and again from September 2000 to November 2001.

In July 2005 Maurer left the SPD and, while retaining his Landtag mandate, joined the WASG, which had formed an electoral alliance with the PDS. He stood as the Left Party's top candidate (Spitzenkandidat) in Baden-Württemberg for the 2005 German federal election and was elected to the Bundestag. Alongside Oskar Lafontaine, he was one of the most prominent former Social Democrats to join the Left Party.PDS that year.

Maurer was a member of the Bundestag from 2005 to 2013. Until October 2009 he served as parliamentary business manager (Parlamentarischer Geschäftsführer) of the Die Linke group, and from October 2009 he was deputy chairman of the group. He was also a member of the party's executive board (geschäftsführender Vorstand) of Die Linke, including a role from June 2007 as the board's officer for party organisation-building in western Germany.

He served on the G 10 Commission, a parliamentary oversight body for surveillance matters, as a full member from 2005 and again from 2009, and later as a deputy member from 2018 to 2021.

He did not stand for re-election in the 2013 German federal election, announcing his decision roughly a year in advance and stating he preferred to leave politics "at the peak" of his career rather than cling to office. After leaving the Bundestag, he was engaged as an adviser by Left Party group leader Gregor Gysi in 2014.

== Other affiliations ==
Maurer is a member of the trade union ver.di, the Arbeiterwohlfahrt (AWO), the Naturfreunde, and the Verein "Gegen Vergessen – für Demokratie". He is Catholic, married, and has two children.

== Publications ==
- Überholt wird links. Was kann, was will, was soll die Linkspartei (editor, with Hans Modrow), edition ost, Berlin 2005, ISBN 3-360-01068-X.
- Eiszeit. Staatsstreich des Kapitals oder Renaissance der Linken, Riemann, Munich 2006, ISBN 3-570-50070-5.
