= Alma Wartenberg =

German women's rights activist

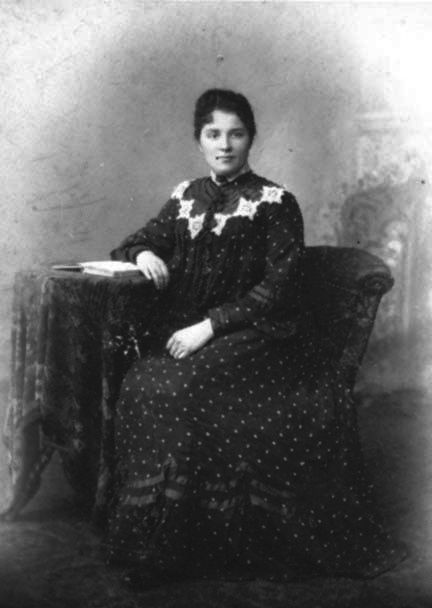
Alma Wartenberg

Wilhelmine Catharina Alma Wartenberg (born Stähr; 22 December 1871 – 25 December 1928) was a member of the Social Democratic Party of Germany and a women's rights activist.

== Life ==
Alma Wartenberg was born into a social democratic working class family with twelve children in Ottensen. She worked as a housemaid until she married the locksmith Ferdinand Wartenberg. They had four children.

In Hamburg-Ottensen, Wartenberg was engaged in forming the proletarian women's movement. From 1902 to 1906, she was elected every year to women's congresses as a social democratic delegate for the constituency Ottensen/Pinneberg. As an agitator amongst working women, Wartenberg toured through the northern province of Schleswig-Holstein and participated in women's conferences and party conventions as a delegate. In 1905, she initiated with others a campaign against the judgement of the Altona court to release four young middle class men after they had been found guilty of the rape of a housemaid. During and after the campaign, Wartenberg supported a collaboration with the so-called "radicals" of the middle class women's movement. This contradicted the official party policy and brought her into conflict with the party leadership. A procedure to expel her from the party was stopped. However, she was nonetheless forced to relinquish her responsibilities as a delegate.

Being denied to continue working as a delegate for the party, Wartenberg took action especially for maternity leave, birth control and sexual education. High infant mortality rate, widespread "women's suffering" due to many births, miscarriages and a large number of illegal abortions, lack of information to sexual issues and missing government support had alarmed her. Again, she toured the country, this time with pictured slide shows, to educate about female anatomy, contraception and maternity leave. Her presentations drew hundreds of attendees. After her talks, she publicly sold contraception, even though the "sale or transmission of hygienic rubber articles" was liable to prosecution in the German Empire. With this she didn't only antagonize the judiciary but also the association of doctors and especially ecclesiastic circles. Repeatedly, she was prosecuted for "offense of public nuisance". However, she insisted on every woman's right to solely decide issues involving her body and her number of births.

Again in contradiction with official party policy, Wartenberg supported the idea of a "childbearing strike", that was controversially discussed within social democracy, as a protest against the compulsion to give birth propagated by the state.

In 1919, Wartenberg became an SPD delegate on the Altona city council. In 1925, she was elected as the sole female member of the provincial Landtag (parliament) of Schleswig-Holstein.

After a stroke, Wartenberg resigned from all her offices in 1927 and died in Altona the following year and is buried in the Altona Main Cemetery.

== Honours ==
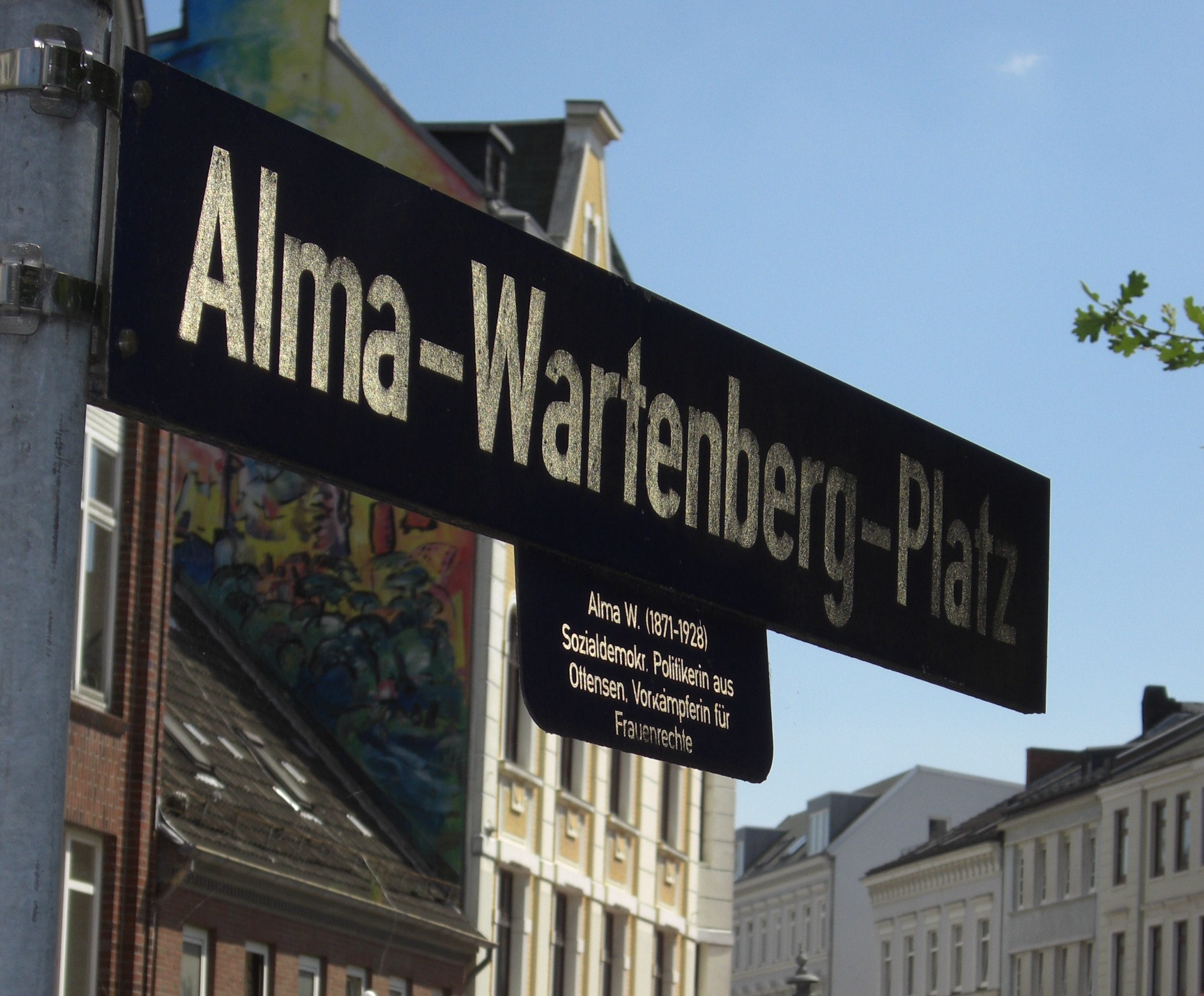
Alma-Wartenberg-Platz

In 1997, a public square in Ottensen was named after Alma Wartenberg.
