= Lisa Kapteinat =

German politician (born 1989)

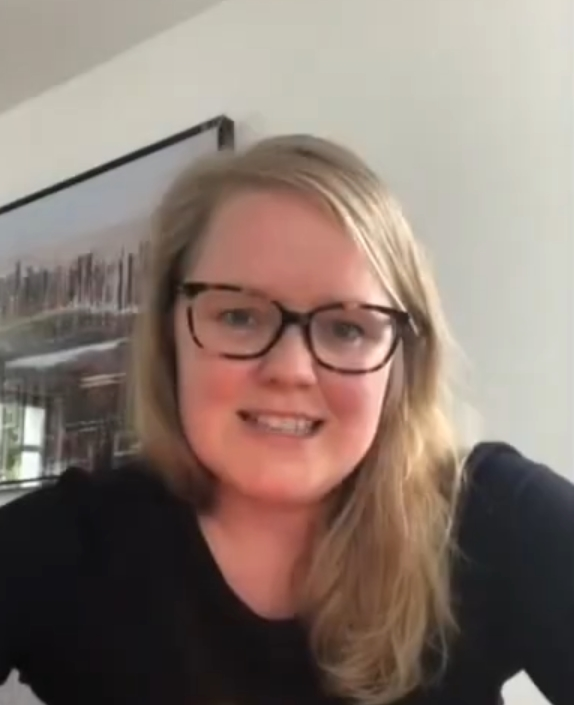

Member of the Landtag of North Rhine-Westphalia
- Incumbent
- Assumed office 1 June 2017

Personal details
- Born: 20 February 1989 (age 37) Witten
- Party: Social Democratic Party (since 2003)

Lisa-Kristin Kapteinat (born 20 February 1989 in Witten) is a German politician serving as a member of the Landtag of North Rhine-Westphalia since 2017. She has served as chairwoman of the Social Democratic Party in Castrop-Rauxel since 2016.
