= Hermann-Josef Kaltenborn =

German politician (1921–1999)

Hermann-Josef Kaltenborn (January 1, 1921 in Essen – March 29, 1999 in Stolberg near Aachen) was a German politician and a member of the Social Democratic Party of Germany (SPD). He was mayor of Stolberg for 10 years.

Kaltenborn moved to Stolberg in 1946 and began working for the SPD. He became a member of the city council of Stolberg. In 1979 Kaltenborn was elected as mayor of Stolberg and succeeded Bernhard Kuckelkorn. Kaltenborn took care of restoring the ancient part of the city.

In 1989, he lost the position as mayor to Wolfgang Hennig.
