= Selma Lohse =

German politician (1883–1937)

Member of the Reichstag
- In office March 1931 – July 1932
- Constituency: Franconia

Member of the Würzburg City Council
- In office 1927–1933

Member of the Lower Franconia District Council
- In office 1919–1933

Personal details
- Born: Selma Rösel; 17 February 1883 Görlitz, Province of Silesia, Kingdom of Prussia, German Empire
- Died: 4 May 1937 (aged 54)
- Party: Social Democratic Party
- Spouse: Max Lohse (m. 1904)
- Children: 3

Selma Lohse (née Rösel; 17 February 1883 – 4 May 1937) was a German politician who served in the Reichstag of the Weimar Republic from 1931 until 1932. A member of the Social Democratic Party, she represented the Franconia constituency. Lohse was also a member of the Lower Franconia district council and the Würzburg city council, serving as one of four women in the latter body.

== Biography ==
Selma Rösel was born on 17 February 1883 in the town of Görlitz, then part of the Kingdom of Prussia within the German Empire. Unlike other lower-class children at the time, she did not begin working after completing school, instead becoming an apprentice seamstress. In 1904, she married Max Lohse, a prominent social democrat and union leader, quitting her apprenticeship to become a housewife and caretaker to their three children. The family moved to the Bavarian city of Würzburg in 1908 after her husband became the regional manager of the German Stone Workers' Association (Steinarbeiterverband).

Lohse first became politically involved in 1911 when she joined the Social Democratic Party. During World War I, she worked as a volunteer in "war welfare", and she was elected to the local "council for the poor and orphans" in 1919. Later that year, she was also elected to the Lower Franconia district council (Kreistag). In 1927, she was also elected to the Würzburg city council, becoming one of four women in the body.

In March 1931, Lohse was appointed to the Reichstag of the Weimar Republic to complete the term of Hermann Müller following his death, representing the Franconia constituency. She left the Reichstag at the end of her term in July 1932. Following the Nazi Party's seizure of power in 1933, women were banned from holding public office, as politics was "considered unsuitable for women". As a result, Lohse was removed from her positions in the district and city councils.

Lohse died on 4 May 1937. A silent demonstration was held at her funeral.
