= Willi Piecyk =

German politician (born 1948)

Willi Piecyk (born 11 August 1948 in Munich; died 1 August 2008 in Großhansdorf) was a German politician and Member of the European Parliament with the Social Democratic Party of Germany, part of the Socialist Group and sat on the European Parliament's Committee on Fisheries and its Committee on Transport and Tourism.

He was a substitute for the Committee on Budgets and a member of the Delegation to the EU-Former Yugoslav Republic of Macedonia Joint Parliamentary Committee.

From 1966 to 1968, he served as a police officer.

== Education ==
- Secondary school-leaving certificate (1972) Studied economics and political science
- 1979: Politics degree
- Adult education tutor
- 1980-1982: Chairman of the Young Socialists
- 1991-1999: Chairman of the Schleswig-Holstein SPD
- 1992-2008: Member of the European Parliament

== See also ==
- 2004 European Parliament election in Germany
