= Annika Urbanski =

German politician (born 1994)

Member of the Hamburg Parliament
- Incumbent
- Assumed office 26 March 2025

Personal details
- Born: 15 October 1994 (age 31)
- Party: Social Democratic Party (since 2011)

Annika Urbanski (born 15 October 1994) is a German politician serving as a member of the Hamburg Parliament since 2025. From 2016 to 2023, she served as chairwoman of the Social Democratic Party in Stellingen.
