= Janina Strelow =

German politician (born 1996)

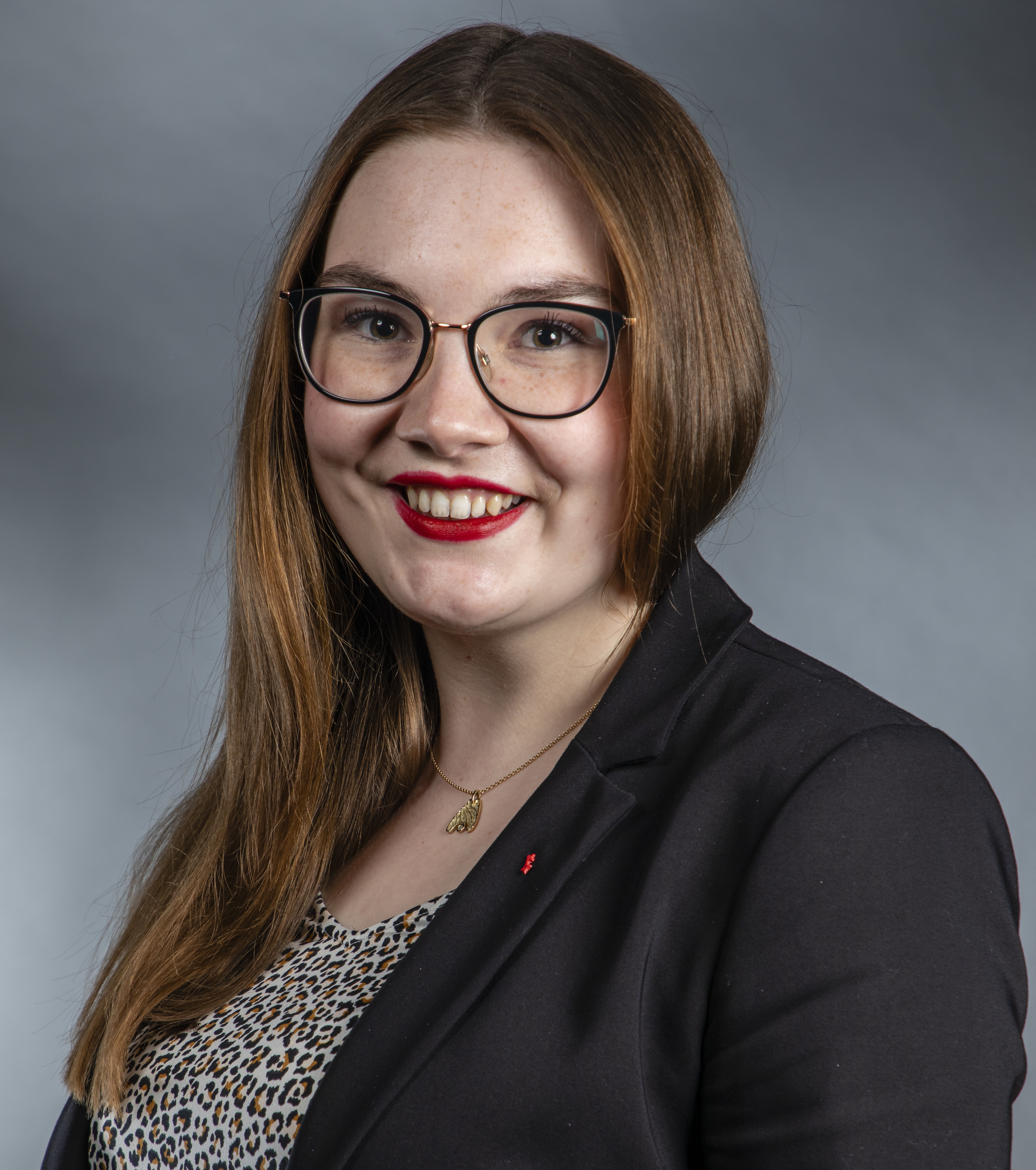
- Strelow in 2019

Member of the Bürgerschaft of Bremen
- Incumbent
- Assumed office 8 June 2019

Personal details
- Born: 13 February 1996 (age 30)
- Party: Social Democratic Party (since 2013)

Janina Strelow (née Brünjes; born 13 February 1996) is a German politician serving as a member of the Bürgerschaft of Bremen since 2019. She has served as deputy group leader of the Social Democratic Party since 2024.
