= Turgut Yüksel =

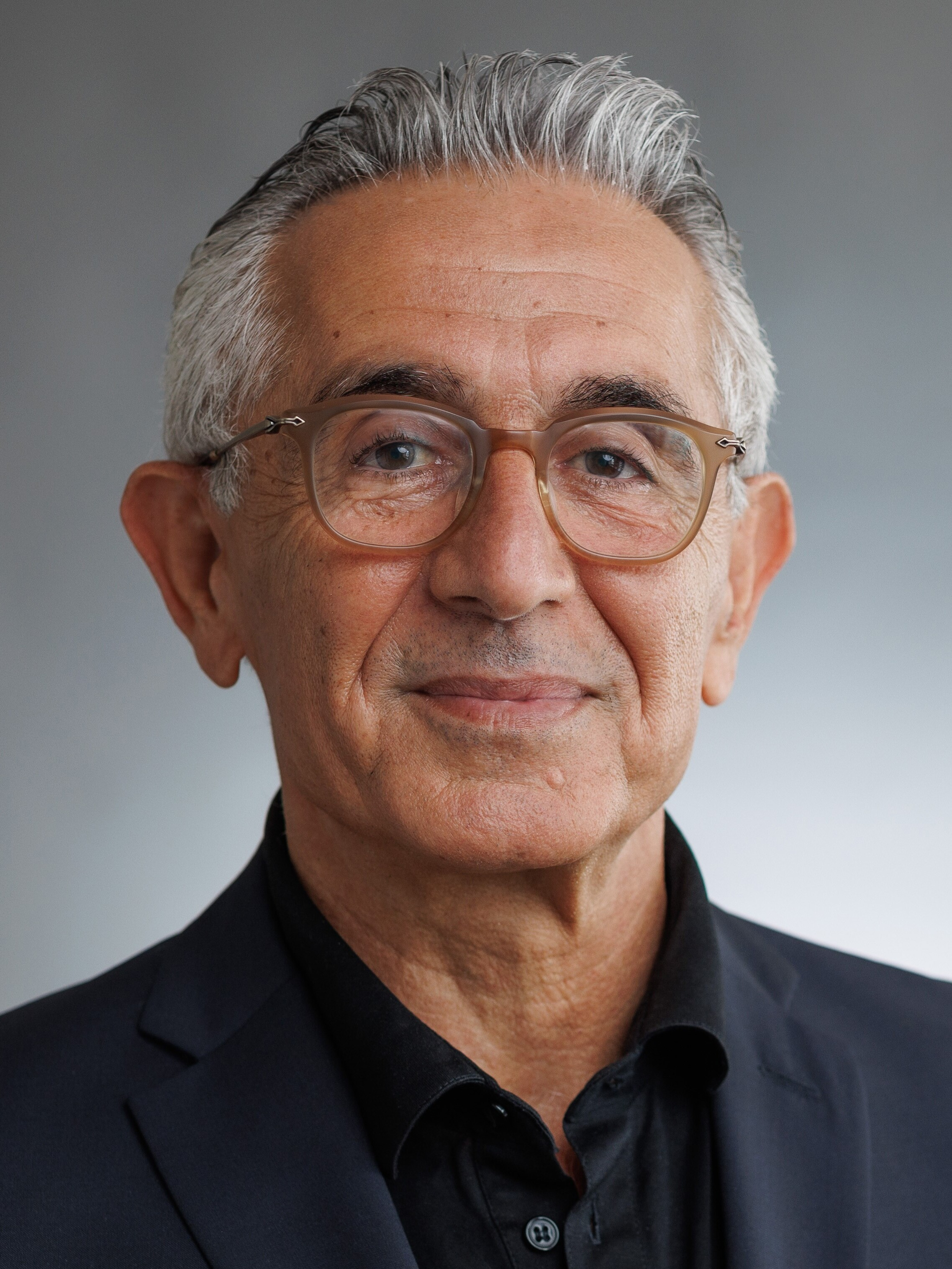
Turgut Yüksel (2022)

Turgut Yüksel (* September 2, 1956 in Pülümür) is a German politician (SPD) of Turkish-Alevi origin. He is a member of the Hessian State Parliament.

== Life ==
Due to his opposition activities, Turgut Yüksel left Turkey and has lived in Germany since 1978. He has also been a German citizen since 1996.

Yüksel studied sociology and economics at the Goethe University Frankfurt in Frankfurt am Main and graduated in 1988 with a diploma in sociology.

He is the father of two sons.

== Politics ==
In 1980, Yüksel carried out a 46-day hunger strike to express his protest against the military coup in Turkey.

Yüksel has been a member of the SPD (Social Democratic Party of Germany) since 1981. Between 1992 and 1996, he was an elected member of the Frankfurt am Main Municipal Council for Foreigners. From 1997 to 2014, he was a member of the Frankfurt am Main City Council, where he served as the SPD parliamentary group's spokesperson on migration and integration policy.

From 2009 to 2019, Turgut Yüksel chaired the SPD's working group on "Migration and Diversity" in Southern Hesse and has been a member of the SPD's executive committee since 2009. He also served on the executive committee of the Frankfurt am Main SPD from 1989 to 1997 and has held this position again since 2015.

In the 2008 Hessian state election in January 2008, he was elected to the Hessian State Parliament via the party list. He left the State Parliament after the snap election in 2009.

From 2009 to 2013, he was a member of the German Islam Conference (DIK).

In the 2013 Hessian state election, he ran in the Frankfurt am Main III constituency. He lost to Ralf-Norbert Bartelt. However, he was re-elected to the state parliament via a party list position.

Yüksel was a member of the 16th Federal Convention, which elected Frank-Walter Steinmeier as the twelfth Federal President of Germany in 2017.

In the 2018 Hessian state election, Yüksel again ran for the Frankfurt am Main III constituency. Despite the SPD's losses, he was re-elected to the state parliament. Turgut Yüksel is currently a member of the Committee on Cultural Policy, the Committee on Social and Integration Policy, and his party's spokesperson on the Subcommittee on Expellees, Resettlers, Refugees, and Reparations in the Hessian State Parliament.

In the 2023 Hessian State Election, Yüksel was again elected to the State Parliament via the party list.

Yüksel is active against the Gülen Movement and criticized his fellow party member, the Mayor of Frankfurt, Peter Feldmann, in 2015 for accepting patronage of an event organized by the movement. According to Yüksel, the Gülen Movement seeks to place God above the state and society and attempts to gain mainstream acceptance through such events.

Yüksel is active against the Gülen Movement and criticized his fellow party member, the Mayor of Frankfurt, Peter Feldmann, in 2015 for accepting patronage of an event organized by the movement. Turgut Yüksel, along with Mürvet Öztürk, was a spokesperson for the "No Initiative Hesse," which campaigned against the 2017 Turkish constitutional referendum and, among other things, conducted door-to-door visits in Frankfurt to raise awareness about its consequences for democracy and human rights. Together with two other members of the Hessian State Parliament of Turkish origin, Yüksel called on the Turkish government and Turkish President Recep Tayyip Erdoğan in 2019 to cease their disregard for democratic and constitutional principles.

In response to the right-wing extremist murder of Kassel's District President Walter Lübcke, Yüksel initiated a petition calling on the Federal Ministry of the Interior, Building and Community to ban all neo-Nazi and fascist groups and organizations, such as Combat 18.

Following the racist attack in Hanau in 2020, Yüksel, together with state parliament member Taylan Burcu, visited the victims' families. In this context, Turgut Yüksel criticized the Hessian Minister of the Interior, Peter Beuth. He stated that Beuth was not providing consistent and transparent information, but rather pursuing a "salami tactic" that left the victims' families in the dark on many issues. He is a decent Member of the "Hanau" inquiry committee in the Hessian State Parliament.

In light of numerous racist incidents, Turgut Yüksel, in a speech to the State Parliament, called for the introduction of an anti-discrimination law for Hesse and greater societal solidarity towards the victims of racism and discrimination.

At the beginning of 2021, the state-owned housing company Nassauische Heimstätte raised rents for approximately 400 people in Frankfurt-Nordweststadt. Yüksel subsequently called on the Hessian state government to reverse the rent increases. He stated that rent increases in the midst of the COVID-19 pandemic were "completely wrong" and "irresponsible."

In his role as the SPD parliamentary group's spokesperson on integration policy, Turgut Yüksel advocates for strengthening heritage language instruction in Hessian schools. The Hessian state government is acting out of touch with the lived reality of Hessian citizens. According to Yüksel, it is rather "a question of equal opportunities and the reduction of discrimination to give greater weight to the heritage languages frequently spoken in the population."

As a member of the Committee on Cultural Policy in the Hessian State Parliament, Turgut Yüksel demanded that every Hessian student participate in a "pedagogically well-prepared" visit to a concentration camp memorial site at least once during their school career. In times of the rise of organized right-wing groups, which are actively recruiting students for their "crude" ideas, this is very important, Yüksel argued.

== Memberships (Selection) ==
- Advisory Board of the Anne Frank Educational Center
- Board of Trustees of the Fritz Bauer Institute
- Advisory Board of the MOND project – “Migrant Organizations Network for Democracy” of the Association for Culture and Education
- Attac
