= Daniela Sommer =

German politician (born 1978)

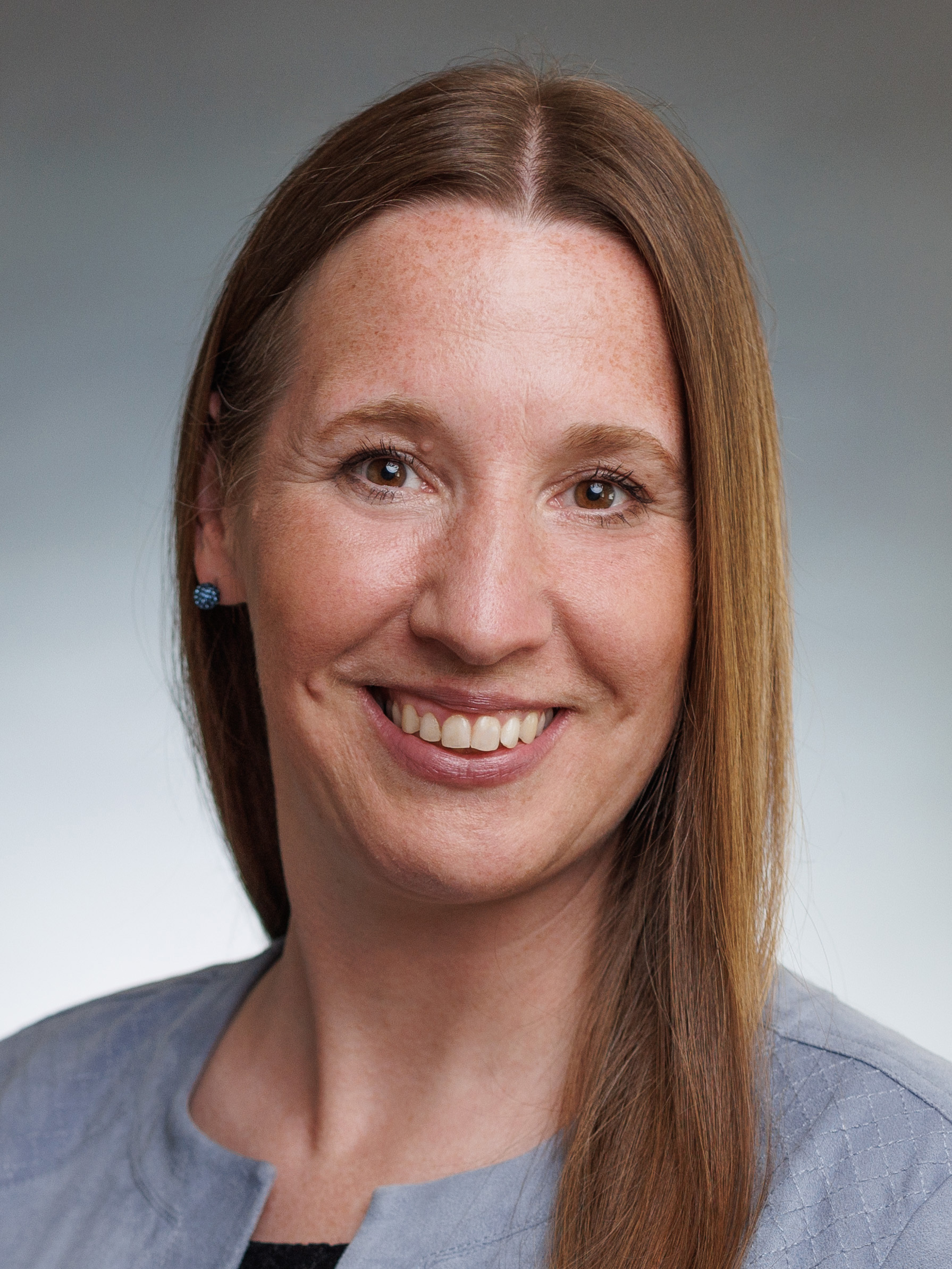
- Sommer in 2022

Member of the Landtag of Hesse
- Incumbent
- Assumed office 18 January 2014

Personal details
- Born: 24 November 1978 (age 47) Wehrda
- Party: Social Democratic Party (since 2010)

Daniela Sommer (born 24 November 1978 in Wehrda) is a German politician serving as a member of the Landtag of Hesse since 2014. She has served as vice president of the Landtag since 2024.
