= Christoph Willeke =

German politician (born 1997)

Member of the Landtag of Lower Saxony
- Incumbent
- Assumed office 8 November 2022
- Preceded by: Sascha Laaken
- Constituency: Goslar

Personal details
- Born: 12 February 1997 (age 29)
- Party: Social Democratic Party (since 2017)

Christoph Dietrich Erich Robert Willeke (born 12 February 1997) is a German politician serving as a member of the Landtag of Lower Saxony since 2022. He has served as chairman of the Social Democratic Party in Bad Harzburg since 2021.
