= Käthe Schaub =

German politician (1892–1973)

Käthe Schaub (born Katharina Krämer; 15 April 1892 – 26 September 1973) was a German politician (SPD). Between 1947 and 1962, she was a member of the regional parliament ("Landtag") of North Rhine-Westphalia.

== Life ==
=== Provenance and early years ===
Käthe Krämer was born in Hüttersdorf, a small town in the hills to the north of Saarlouis. Her mother was young and at that time unmarried. In order to support herself and her daughter she worked as a domestic servant, while Käthe spent the early part of her childhood living with her grandparents and with other relatives. After her mother married the machinist, Emil Schaub, Käthe was adopted by her step father, and spent the rest of her childhood as the eldest of her parents' (eventually) twelve children. Emil Schaub's wages from his work with F. Küppersbusch & Söhne AG (which at that time claimed to be the country's largest supplier of cooking hobs and ovens) at their factory in nearby Schalke were quickly spent as the family grew: hunger and material shortage were, as for the families of many industrial workers in Germany at that time, regular features of Käthe Schaub's childhood. She attended school locally and then, as the eldest child, immediately transferred to work at a textile factory in order to be able to contribute to the family's income. Influenced by her step father, in 1910 she joined a trades union as a textiles worker. Two years later she joined the Social Democratic Party ("Sozialdemokratische Partei Deutschlands" / SPD). After seven years in the textiles factory, in 1913 she moved to Berlin. In September 1917 she returned to the north-west of Germany, obtaining a job as a housekeeper in Rheydt. She lost her job at the end of the war, and a period of unemployment followed.

With help from party colleagues she was now able to participate in a training at the Welfare Academy in Cologne for female welfare workers. From now on she involved herself in issues of welfare, social policy, training and education - themes which became ever more central to her developing social and political engagement. At a one-day party conference in Neuss she was "spotted" by the ambitious young council official ("Landrat") from Hörde, Wilhelm Hansmann, who encouraged her to apply for a job as a welfare worker in Hörde, which at that time was a separate municipality just outside Dortmund. That application came to nothing because of what one source described as bureaucratic and organisational impediments. She may have obtained a posting, briefly, as a welfare worker in Cologne starting in April 1922. Either way, in December 1921 or December 1922 - source differ as to the year - she obtained a job in the welfare sector at another then separate municipality on the edge of Dortmund, Lütgendortmund. She moved to Lütgendortmund which is where she lived and worked for the rest of her life.

After a six-month probationary period her position was made permanent. This was followed by a further training period, and after a national course which she attended at the Women's Spocial Academy at Münster she became a state registered welfare officer.

=== Politics ===
She also devoted more of her time, at his stage still on an unpaid basis, to SPD party work locally, during the course of which she won admiration and respect from many party comrades in and around Dortmund. On 4 May 1924, she was elected, for the first time to the Lütgendortmund town council. Her name was also placed sufficiently high up on the SPD party list for the Dortmund district elections in November 1924 to ensure her election to the Dortmund district assembly. Here she was elected deputy leader of the chamber. The focus of her work in the assembly was on social issues. She also opposed the local government boundary reforms which would have led to Lütgendortmund and other surrounding municipalities being subsumed, for administrative purposes, into a greatly enlarged Dortmund. Despite uncompromising opposition from Schaub and others the reforms were pushed through, with the result that with effect from April 1928 Käthe Schaub ceased to be a Lütgendortmund town councillor, becoming instead a city councillor in "Greater Dortmund" in the ensuing local election.

=== Nazi years ===
Change of government in January 1933 was followed by a rapid transition to one-party dictatorship. Käthe Schaub was identified as a Social Democrat which marked her out for state persecution. The government ordered new elections, and in the municipal elections of March 1933 she was re-elected to the city council, although it is not clear if the new city council ever met, and on 20 June 1933 the SPD was formally outlawed. Five days later, while she was out, Nazi paramilitaries searched her apartment and removed various anti-Nazi papers and other documents evidencing "left wing thinking", along with a list of SPD women in Lütgendortmund, an article in support of birth control and a banner clearly intended for use in a demonstration against Clause 218 - Germany's long-standing constitutional anti-abortion provision. The next month the so-called Law for the Restoration of the Professional Civil Service came into force and on 7 April 1933 Dortmund's recently installed Nazi Commissar, Bruno Schüler, removed her from her from her job as a welfare officer.

What followed was a period of renewed austerity. Following her enforced retirement Schaub was entitled to a small pension, but this was not enough to live on. She was forced to stop making support payments to relatives and she lost her home. By this time she was in a long-term relationship with Willi Schröder, who with his parents was in the process of building a family home, and she now moved into this half built house with the Schröders. Despite threats and harassment, during the next few years they were able to use the house as a meeting point for Lütgendortmund Social Democrats. Small meetings were held quietly in the garden when outdoor temperatures allowed it. The old banner of the town was kept safely in the house. In 1936/37 they concealed and accommodated the child of friends who were Jewish and had to leave Germany but were not permitted to take the child with them. Later Käthe Schaub was able personally to reunite the child with her parents. In most respects, keeping a low profile, Schröder and Schaub managed to survive the first eleven Nazi years without suffering acute persecution. That changed after the assassination attempt on the leader. Despite failing in its primary objective, the "July plot" greatly unnerved the government, which feared a further collapse in support for the war on the home front and responded by dusting down lists of political activists from before 1933. The list were not up to date. Many of the names on it belonged to people who had fled abroad or simply died, in some cases from natural causes. Nevertheless, overnight between 22 and 23 August 1944 a "mass arrest action" by the Gestapo, supported by local police services, took place across Germany. Käthe Schaub was one of approximately 5,000 people arrested in the context of what later came to be known as Aktion Gitter. She was detained in the "Dortmund stone keep" ("Steinwache"), the city's by now increasingly infamous prison, informally known, according to one source, as the west German Hell" ("Hölle von Westdeutschland"), but she was unexpectedly released after six weeks.

=== After the war ===
Military defeat in May 1945 marked the end of the Nazi régime. The central and western two thirds of Germany were now placed under military occupation and divided into four military occupation zones. In Dortmund, now included in the British occupation zone, Schaub quickly resumed her work in the care sector in the Lütgendortmund quarter of the city. She had little appetite for any return to politics. It was Wilhelm Hansmann, who had spent the later war years abroad but was now returned to a leading role in regional politics, who persuaded her to return to the political fray. She became a member of the party committee for the sub-district of western Westphalia (Dortmund and the surrounding area) and, from 1947, with only brief interruptions, chaired the regional women's committee. She was also, at one point, a member of the party's national committee.

The British, possibly in order to reduce the political importance of what had been Prussia, had reconfigured the state boundaries, creating a new German state of North Rhine-Westphalia. There was a scramble in three of the four allied occupation zones to re-establish democratic institutions, and for the new state a new state parliament ("Landtag") was set up, convening in Düsseldorf. Until elections could be organised seats were allocated, in October 1946, to political parties according to the vote shares received in 1932, which was accepted as the last time free and fair elections had been held. Käthe Schaub was appointed a member of the assembly, representing the SPD (party). When an election was held, in April 1947, she retained her seat, again representing the "Dortmund V" electoral district. Following the relaunch, in May 1949 of three of the four occupation zones as the US-sponsored German Federal Republic (West Germany), she remained a member of the assembly through several further elections, until 1962 when she turned down the opportunity to put her name forward again. Within the Landtag her party group nominated her to the position of presidium secretary ("Schriftführerin des Parlamentspräsidiums"). Reports indicate that she hardly ever addressed the chamber during set piece debates, but behind the scenes contributed fully to committee work. She chaired the parliament's welfare committee and was a member of several other committees covering areas that included De-nazification, Refugees, Budget and Finance. A source indicates that her diplomatic skills and rejection of gratuitous political partisanship caused her to gain the positive soubriquet "The Parliament's mother" ("Mutter des Parlaments").

By 1962, when she resigned from Landtag, she had reached the age of 70, and she resigned from most of her other political roles and offices at around the same time. To celebrate her contribution she was awarded the Order of Merit of the Federal Republic of Germany, but she rejected the honour, commenting "Ich bin nicht für so etwas" (loosely: "I'm not a supporter of that sort of thing"). However, friends persuaded her to change her mind on this. Regardless of her convictions over the honours system, she was unable to prevent the authorities from naming a street after her in Dortmund-Lütgendortmund.

Käthe Schaub died towards the end of September 1982 at Dortmund-Lütgendortmund. One source gives the date of her death as 27 September 1972, but there is not total unanimity between sources over the precise date of her death.
