= Damhat Sisamci =

German politician (born 1993)

Member of the Landtag of Saarland
- Incumbent
- Assumed office 25 April 2022

Personal details
- Born: 1993 (age 32–33)
- Party: Social Democratic Party

Damhat Sisamci (born 1993) is a German politician serving as a member of the Landtag of Saarland since 2022. He is the chairman of Jusos in Neunkirchen.
