= Sarah Timmann =

German politician (born 1997)

Member of the Hamburg Parliament
- Incumbent
- Assumed office 2020

Personal details
- Born: 1 April 1997 (age 29) Hamburg
- Party: Social Democratic Party of Germany
- Education: University of Hamburg

Sarah Nina Timmann (born 1 April 1997) is a German politician from the Social Democratic Party (SPD). She has been a member of the Hamburg Parliament since 2020.

== Life ==
Timmann grew up in Barmbek-Nord and attended the Klosterschule high school, where she graduated in 2015. She is a law student at the University of Hamburg.

Timmann has been a member of the SPD and the Jusos since 2014. Since 2018, she has been a member of the district executive committee of the SPD Hamburg-Nord.

In the 2020 Hamburg state election, she was directly elected to the 22nd Hamburg Parliament in the Barmbek – Uhlenhorst – Dulsberg (constituency 9).
