= Ferdinand Gatzweiler =

Mayor of Stolberg
- In office 2004–2014

Personal details
- Born: 2 June 1955 (age 69); Stolberg, West Germany
- Political party: SPD
- Nickname: Ferdi

Ferdinand "Ferdi" Gatzweiler (born 2 June 1955) was the mayor of the city of Stolberg, in the Rhineland, from 2004 to 2014. He is a member of the SPD.

== Biography ==
Born in Stolberg, Gatzweiler was the second of three children. After attending a Volksschule, he attended the Goethe-Gymnasium. Following his completion of the 11 grade, he began an administrative apprenticeship for the city of Stolberg in 1973. In 1987, having in the meantime earned his Diplom in Public administration, he became the deputy head of the Agency for Sports, School Administration, and Culture, eventually becoming the Department Head in 1993. In 2001, he took over the city's Jugendamt.

In the local election in Stolberg on 26 September 2004, Gatzweiler ran for office for the first time. No candidate, however, won an outright majority, with the former mayor Hans-Josef Siebertz (CDU) receiving 38.9% of the votes, and Ferdinand Gatzweiler receiving 41.9%, so a run-off election was held. During this second round of voting on 10 October 2004, Gatzweiler was elected mayor with 58.7%. In August 2009, he was reelected with 47.7% of the vote. His strongest opponent, Paul M. Kirch of the CDU, received 38.2%. During the campaign, he was also endorsed as a candidate by the local chapter of the Alliance '90/The Greens, which, unlike the other parties, did not run its own candidate for mayor.

In 2014, Gatzweiller lost his bid for reelection to the CDU candidate, Tim Grüttemeier.

Since 1982, Gatzweiler has been married to Brigitte Gatzweiler, with whom he has a son.
