= Hans Wunderlich =

German journalist and politician

Hans Wunderlich (18 June 1899 - 26 December 1977) was a German journalist and politician of the SDP.

He was born in Munich and died at Osnabrück.
