= Lena Otto =

German politician (born 1993)

Member of the Hamburg Parliament
- Incumbent
- Assumed office 26 March 2025

Personal details
- Born: 27 December 1993 (age 32)
- Party: Social Democratic Party (since 2016)

Lena Otto (born 27 December 1993) is a German politician serving as a member of the Hamburg Parliament since 2025. She has served as chairwoman of the Social Democratic Party in Hamburg-Nord since 2023.
