= Heike Hofmann (politician) =

German politician (born 1973)

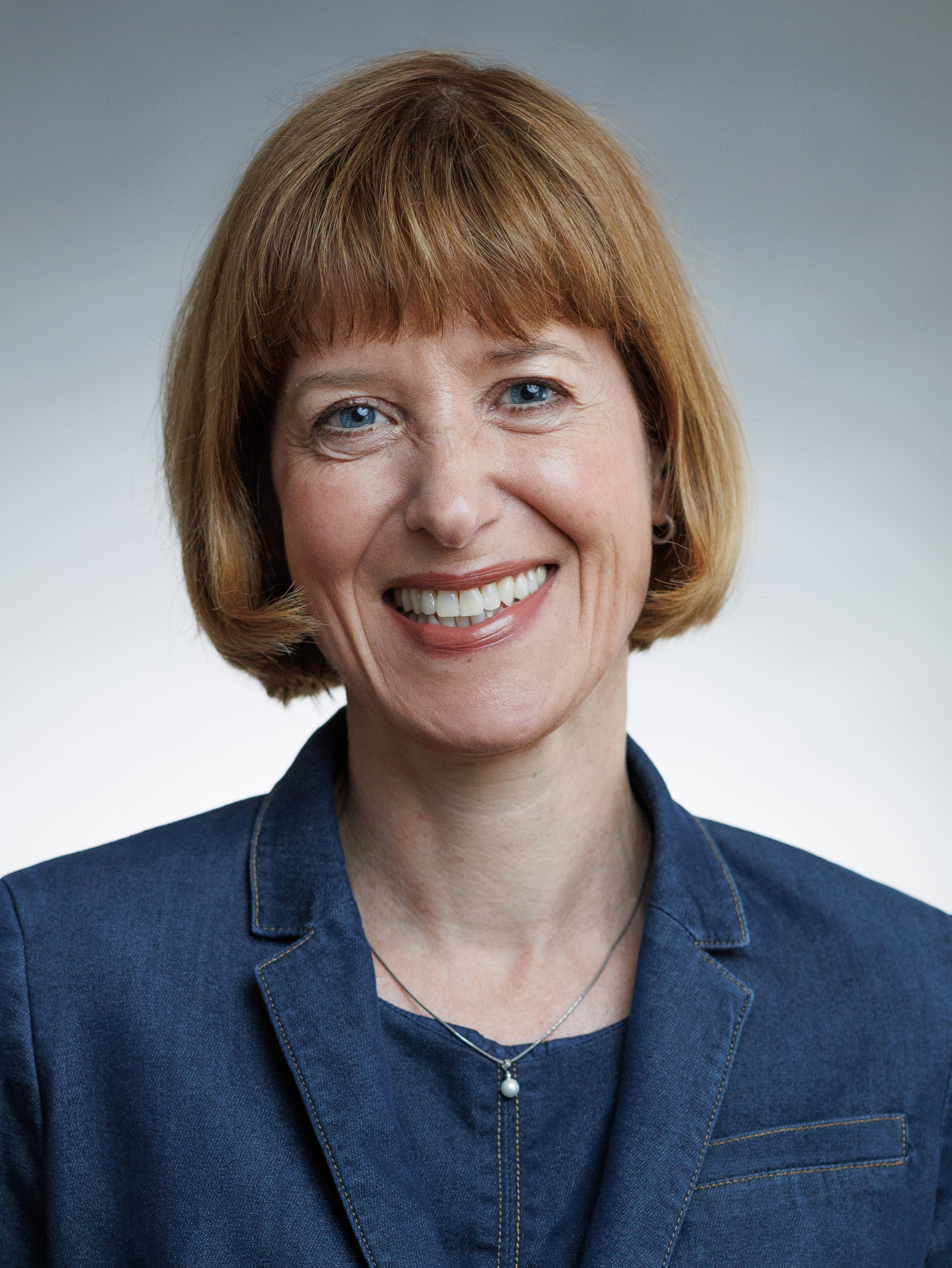
- Hofmann in 2022

Minister of Labour, Integration, Youth and Social Affairs of Hesse
- Incumbent
- Assumed office 18 January 2024
- Minister-President: Boris Rhein

Personal details
- Born: 30 June 1973 (age 52)
- Party: Social Democratic Party (since 1989)

Heike Hofmann (born 30 June 1973) is a German politician serving as minister of labour, integration, youth and social affairs of Hesse since 2024. From 2000 to 2024, she was a member of the Landtag of Hesse.
