= Thore Güldner =

German politician (born 1995)

Member of the Landtag of Lower Saxony
- Incumbent
- Assumed office 8 November 2022

Personal details
- Born: 9 December 1995 (age 30)
- Party: Social Democratic Party (since 2014)

Thore Güldner (born 9 December 1995) is a German politician serving as a member of the Landtag of Lower Saxony since 2022. He has served as chairman of the Social Democratic Party in Dötlingen since 2019.
