= Johannes Ritter =

Danish footballer (born 1995)

Personal information
- Full name: Johannes Ritter Plum
- Date of birth: 15 February 1995 (age 31)
- Place of birth: Helsingør, Denmark
- Positions: Right-back; right winger

Youth career
- –2008: Helsingør IF
- 2008–2014: Nordsjælland

Senior career*
Years	Team	Apps	(Gls)
2014–2016	Nordsjælland	2	(0)
2016–2018	Helsingør	21	(0)

International career
2013	Denmark U19	6	(2)
- * Club domestic league appearances and goals

Johannes Ritter Plum (born 15 February 1995) is a Danish former professional footballer who played as a right-back or right winger.

== Club career ==
=== Nordsjælland ===
Ritter joined the Nordsjælland youth academy as an under-14 player from Helsingør IF. In 2012, he was named in Nordsjælland's UEFA Champions League squad.

In 2014, he was among six under-19 players promoted to Nordsjælland's Danish Superliga squad.

However, Ritter struggled for playing time and, in January 2016, was sent on trial to SønderjyskE. After impressing, he discussed his future with head coach Kasper Hjulmand, who had previously promoted him to the Superliga squad. Ritter ultimately chose to stay at Nordsjælland, with his prospects improving following the departure of Adam Örn Arnarson. Having transitioned from a forward to a right-back, a position with limited depth at Nordsjælland, Ritter's chances of regular playing time increased. He made his professional debut on 13 March 2016, playing the full match as a right-back in a 3–1 Superliga defeat to Odense Boldklub (OB).

=== Helsingør ===
On 2 August 2016, Ritter signed with Danish 1st Division club FC Helsingør on a contract running through the end of 2016, following the termination of his deal with Nordsjælland the previous day. He made his debut for the club on 11 August, replacing Vito Hammershøy-Mistrati in the 82nd minute of a 2–2 away draw against Vejle.

On 31 January 2017, Ritter extended his contract with Helsingør until 2019.

Ritter retired in November 2018 due to a hip injury sustained during the previous season. Reflecting on his career, he expressed gratitude for fulfilling his dream of playing professionally, despite being forced to stop due to his injury.

== International career ==
On 13 August 2013, Ritter made his international debut for the Denmark under-19 team. He came on as a substitute in the 83rd minute for Andrew Hjulsager in a 4–0 win in a friendly against Romania.

== Personal life ==
Following his early retirement in 2018, Ritter pursued studies to become a freight forwarder at Roskilde Business College. He has since worked as a freight forwarder at several logistics companies.
