= Gregory Scholz =

German politician (born 1981)

Member of the Landtag of Rhineland-Palatinate
- Incumbent
- Assumed office 2 August 2023
- Preceded by: Heike Scharfenberger
- Constituency: Ludwigshafen am Rhein II

Personal details
- Born: 21 June 1981 (age 44) Landau in der Pfalz
- Party: Social Democratic Party

Gregory Scholz (born 21 June 1981 in Landau in der Pfalz) is a German politician serving as a member of the Landtag of Rhineland-Palatinate since 2023. He has served as secretary general of the Social Democratic Party in Rhineland-Palatinate since 2025.
