= Tim Wook =

German politician (born 1995)

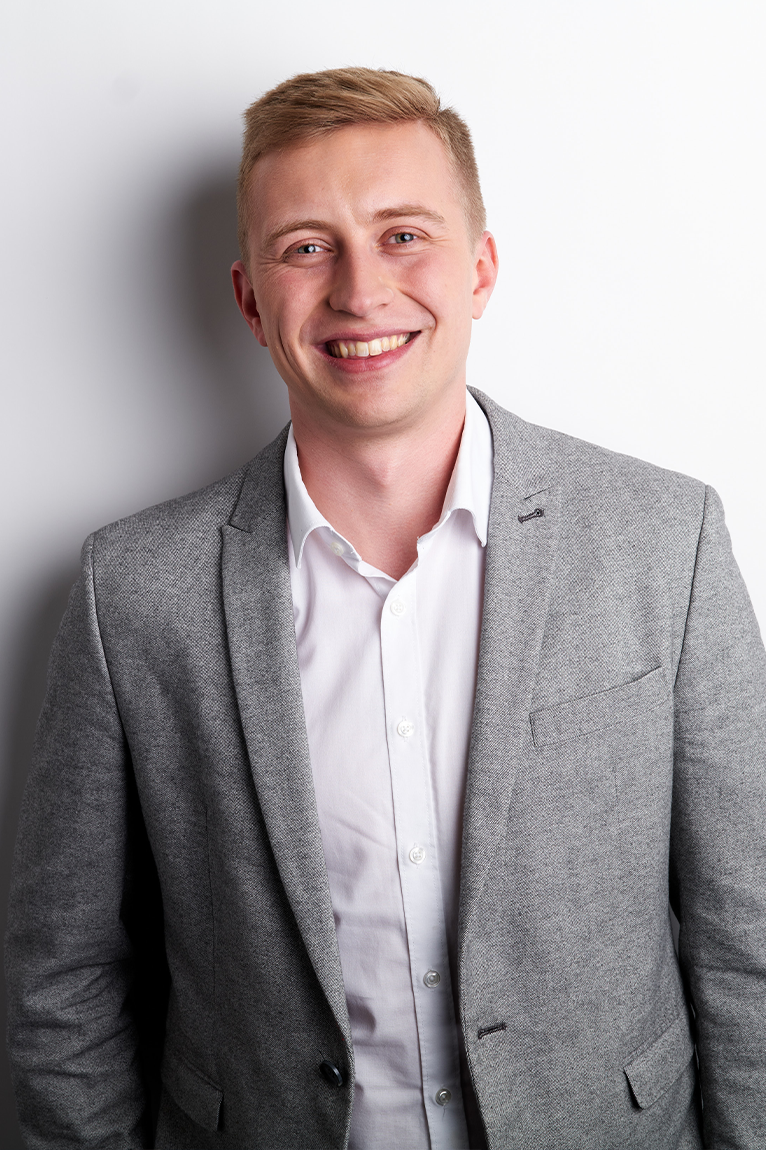
- Wook in 2022

Member of the Landtag of Lower Saxony
- Incumbent
- Assumed office 8 November 2022

Personal details
- Born: 26 March 1995 (age 31)
- Party: Social Democratic Party (since 2014)

Tim Julian Wook (born 26 March 1995) is a German politician serving as a member of the Landtag of Lower Saxony since 2022. He has served as mayor of Godshorn since 2021.
