= Günther Pohl =

German long-distance runner

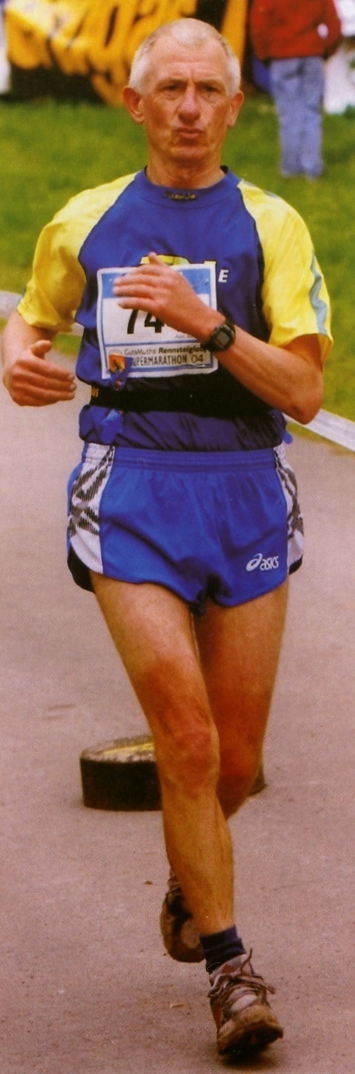
Günther Pohl at Rennsteiglauf Supermarathon in 2004

Günther Pohl (born 23 August 1939 in Berlin, Germany) is a German longdistance- and ultra/marathon runner.

== Achievements ==
Cup-Results

Year	Place	Age Class	Competition
2004	1st Place	M65	European Ultramarathon Cup
2004	1st Place	M65	Thüringen-Cup
2004	1st Place	M65	Klassiker-Cup
2005	1st Place	M65	European Ultramarathon Cup
2005	3rd Place	M65	Thüringen-Cup
2006	1st Place	M65	European Ultramarathon Cup
2007	1st Place	M65	Erfurter Laufcup
2008	1st Place	M65	Erfurter Laufcup
2009	1st Place	M70	Erfurter Laufcup
2009	1st Place	M70	Saale-Cup
2009	3rd Place	M70	Thüringen-Cup
2010	1st Place	M70	Deutsche Meisterschaften (75 km)
2011	1st Place	M70	100 km-Cup
2011	2nd Place	M70	Erfurter Laufcup
2013	1st Place	M70	Erfurter Laufcup
2014	1st Place	M75	European Ultramarathon Cup
