= Maximilian Raber =

German politician (born 1992)

Member of the Landtag of Saarland
- Incumbent
- Assumed office 25 April 2022

Personal details
- Born: 15 August 1992 (age 33)
- Party: Social Democratic Party

Maximilian Raber (born 15 August 1992) is a German politician serving as a member of the Landtag of Saarland since 2022. He has served as chairman of the Social Democratic Party in Sankt Ingbert since 2021.
