= Julius Schneider =

German politician (born 1992)

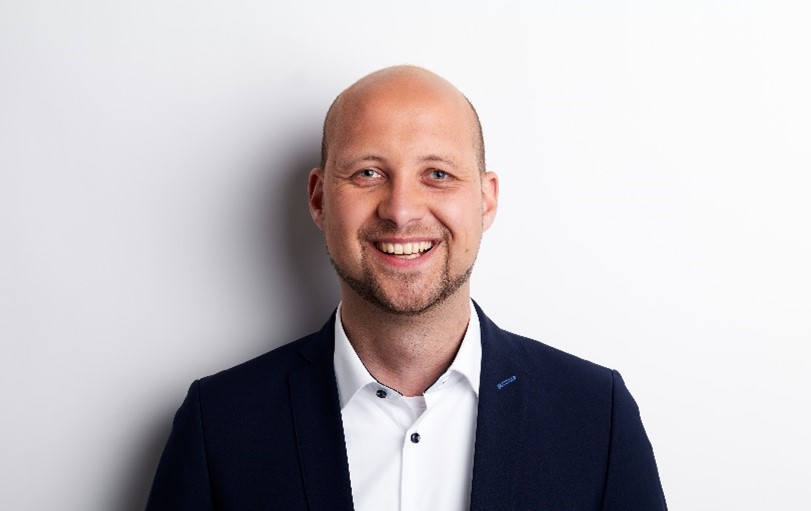
- Schneider in 2022

Member of the Landtag of Lower Saxony
- Incumbent
- Assumed office 8 November 2022

Personal details
- Born: 21 September 1992 (age 33)
- Party: Social Democratic Party (since 2009)

Julius Schneider (born 21 September 1992) is a German politician serving as a member of the Landtag of Lower Saxony since 2022. He has served as chairman of the Social Democratic Party in Peine since 2016.
