= Fletch Bizzel =

Theatre in North Rhine-Westphalia, Germany

Coordinates: 51°30′38″N 7°27′14″E

Fletch Bizzel is a theatre in Dortmund, North Rhine-Westphalia, Germany.
