= Heinrich Schulz (politician) =

German politician (1872–1932)

Heinrich Schulz (12 September 1872, Bremen – 4 September, 1932 Berlin) was a German politician and educational reformer active in the Social Democratic Party of Germany. He pioneered what is considered a German form of shorthand called "German standard shorthand " (DEK).

== Early years ==
Schulz grew up in Bremen-Gröpelingen. He graduated from elementary and junior high school and attended the Bremen teacher training college from 1889 to 1892. He started teaching at a private secondary school in Bremen. He did military service in Leipzig for a year in 1893. In 1894 he went to Berlin as a freelance writer.

== Political career ==
Schulz joined the SPD in 1892. After he moved to Berlin, in 1895 he was appointed chairman of the social democratic workers' school in Berlin. At the same time he worked in the party press service of the SPD and was deputy chairman of the Freie Volksbühne Berlin . From 1897 to 1901 he was editor-in-chief of the Tribüne and until 1902 a Volksstimme in Erfurt. From 1901 to 1906 he worked again in Bremen as head of the Bremer Bürger-Zeitung. In 1905 he founded the education committee of the union cartel. In 1906 he co-wrote Leitsätze zum Thema Sozialdemokratie und Volkserziehung (Guidelines on Popular Education) with Clara Zetkin which was presented at the SPD Mannheim Conference. In this document the authors affirmed their adherence to Marxism and called on the SPD to set up its own educational institutions which should challenge "bourgeois science" and develop the "highest scientific and artistic standards of our time, but contrary to bourgeois ideology of Science and Arts".

Schulz worked from 1906 to 1919 as managing director of the central education committee of the SPD. Although he was originally to be found on the left wing of the party around Rosa Luxemburg, he adopted the Burgfriedenspolitik positions of Friedrich Ebert at the outbreak of the First World War. During the First World War Schulz served in the army in Namur, Belgium. After his discharge from military service in November 1918, he was employed by Friedrich Ebert as his personal advisor, managing director of the Reich Chancellery and liaison with the Reich and state authorities. In 1919 he was appointed to the executive of the SPD, and from 1919 was chairman of the Central Office for Working Youth, which later became the "Association of German Youth Workers' Associations". He was also the chairman of the "Reich Committee for Socialist Education Work".

In the twenties he was chairman of the "Working Group of Social Democratic Teachers" and head of the "Socialist Cultural Association".

Schulz died on September 4, 1932, in Berlin, at age 59.
