= Heike Raab =

German politician

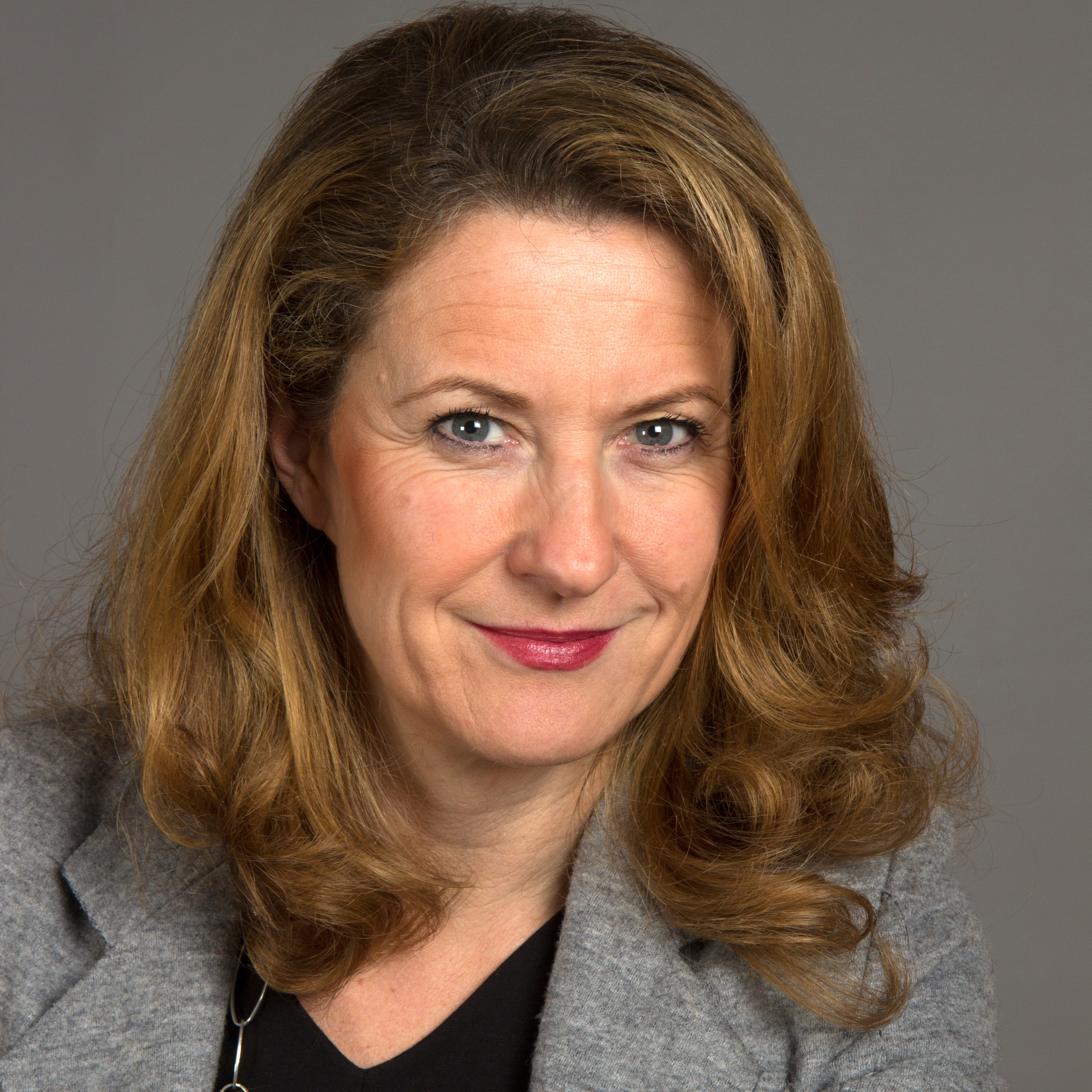
- Heike Raab in 2014

Undersecretary/ Deputy State Minister of the Interior, for Sports and Infrastructure of Rhineland-Palatinate
- In office 18 May 2011 – 2026

Personal details
- Born: 8 April 1965 (age 61) Cochem, Rhineland-Palatinate, West Germany (now Germany)
- Party: SPD
- Education: Technical University of Aachen
- Website: www.heike-raab.de

Heike Raab (born 8 April 1965) is a German politician (SPD) who served as Deputy Minister of the Interior, for Sports and Infrastructure of the state of Rhineland-Palatinate.

== Early life and education ==
- 1984: Abitur (high school diploma), Hilda Gymnasium Koblenz (high school)
- 1984 – 1987: Degree course for physical therapy, Technical University of Aachen, Germany
- 1988 – 1992: University studies (M.A. degree): Political Sciences, Public Law and Spanish

== Career ==
- 1992 – 1993: Research Assistant for the German Federal Parliament (Deutscher Bundestag)
- 1993 – 1994: State Chancellery, personal assistant of the Minister-President Rudolf Scharping
- 1994 – 1998: Personal assistant of the Chairman of the Social Democratic Party in the Deutsche Bundestag, Rudolf Scharping
- 1999 – 2001: Head of Division in the State Chancellery of Rhineland-Palatinate
- 2011 – 2026: Undersecretary/ Deputy Minister of the Interior, for Sports and Infrastructure

As one of the state's representatives at the Bundesrat since 2015, Raab served on the Committee on European Affairs. She was also a member of the German-Polish Friendship Group set up by the Bundesrat and the Senate of Poland.

== Political positions ==
- 1989: Member of the Social Democratic Party
- 2000: Chairwoman of the county chapter of the Social Democrats in Cochem-Zell County
- 2001 – 2011: Member of Parliament, Rhineland-Palatinate
- 2004: Chairwoman of the Social Democratic parliamentary group in the County Council of Cochem-Zell
- 2006 – 2011: Secretary-General of the Social Democratic Party in Rhineland-Palatinate

== Other activities ==
=== Corporate boards ===
- KfW, Ex-Officio Member of the Board of Supervisory Directors (since 2021)

=== Non-profit organizations ===
- ZDF, Member of the Program Committee
- Schüler Helfen Leben, Member of the Board of Trustees
