= Albert Schulz =

Albert Schulz (1802–1893) was a German writer on mediaeval literature, especially the Arthurian legends.

== Biography ==
Schulz was born at Schwedt, studied law, and entered the judicial service at Magdeburg.

== Works ==
Schulz's studies in his specialized field were published under the pseudonym San Marte:

- Leben und Dichten Wolframs von Eschenbach (1836–1841) – includes a version of the Parzival
- Die Arthursage (1842)
- Nennius und Gildas (1844)
- Beiträge zur bretonischen und keltisch-germanischen Heldensage (1847)
- Rückblicke auf Dichtungen und Sagen des deutschen Mittelalters (1872)
