= List of members of the Landtag of North Rhine-Westphalia 2017–2022 =

The composition of the Landtag after the 2017 election

This is a list of members of the Landtag of North Rhine-Westphalia in the 2017–2022 legislature. The Landtag of North Rhine-Westphalia is legislature of the German state of North Rhine-Westphalia, and consists of 199 members. They are elected once every five years. The members in this list were elected in the 2017 election.

The government during this legislature was the Laschet cabinet, a coalition of the Christian Democratic Union (CDU), and Free Democratic Party (FDP).

== Members of the Landtag ==
Name	Party	Picture	Constituency	Born	Notes	Ref.
Britta Altenkamp	SDP		Essen III	1964		
Berivan Aymaz	The Greens		Party list	1972		
Volkan Baran	SDP		Dortmund II	1978		
Roger Beckamp	AfD		Party list	1975		
Andreas Becker	SDP		Recklinghausen I	1966		
Horst Becker	The Greens		Party list	1956		
Sigrid Beer	The Greens		Party list	1956		
Daniela Beihl	FDP		Party list	1984	Replaced Moritz Körner after he was elected to the European Parliament.	
Dietmar Bell	SDP		Wuppertal I	1961		
Jürgen Berghahn	SDP		Lippe II	1960		
Günther Bergmann	CDU		Kleve II	1965		
Andreas Bialas	SDP		Wuppertal II	1968		
Peter Biesenbach	CDU		Kreis I	1948	Minister for Justice since June 2017	
Rainer Bischoff	SDP		Duisburg II	1958		
Inge Blask	SDP		Party list	1958	Replaced Svenja Schulze in March 2018 after she was made a federal minister.	
Christian Blex	AfD		Party list	1975		
Jörg Blöming	CDU		Soest II	1972		
Marc Blondin	CDU		Krefeld II	1972		
Matthias Bolte-Richter	The Greens		Party list	1985		
Ralph Bombis	FDP		Party list	1971		
Sonja Bongers	SDP		Oberhausen I	1976		
Frank Börner	SDP		Duisburg IV – Wesel V	1966		
Martin Börschel	SDP		Köln VII	1972		
Frank Boss	CDU		Mönchengladbach I	1961		
Rainer Bovermann	SDP		Ennepe-Ruhr-Kreis I	1957		
Florian Braun	CDU		Köln V	1989		
Wibke Brems	The Greens		Party list	1981	Replaced Sylvia Löhrmann in July 2017 after she resigned.	
Dietmar Brockes	FDP		Party list	1970		
Alexander Brockmeier	FDP		Party list	1992	Replaced Dirk Wedel in June 2017 after he was made Secretary of State for Justice	
Nadja Büteführ	SDP		Ennepe-Ruhr-Kreis II	1966		
Anja Butschkau	SDP		Dortmund IV	1966		
Christian Dahm	SDP		Herford I – Minden-Lübbecke III	1963		
Rainer Deppe	CDU		Rheinisch-Bergischer Kreis II	1956		
Guido Déus	CDU		Bonn I	1968		
Lorenz Deutsch	FDP		Party list	1969		
Markus Diekhoff	FDP		Party list	1978		
Gordan Dudas	SDP		Märkischer Kreis III	1971		
Monika Düker	The Greens		Party list	1963	Group leader of the Greens	
Iris Dworeck-Danielowski	AfD		Party list	1978		
Stefan Engstfeld	The Greens		Party list	1963	Replaced Barbara Steffens in May 2018 after she resigned	
Angela Erwin	CDU		Düsseldorf III	1980		
Georg Fortmeier	SDP		Gütersloh I – Bielefeld III	1955		
Björn Franken	CDU		Rhein-Sieg-Kreis I	1979		
Angela Freimuth	FDP		Party list	1966		
Jörn Freynick	FDP		Party list	1982		
Heinrich Frieling	CDU		Soest I	1985		
Anke Fuchs-Dreisbach	CDU		Siegen-Wittgenstein II	1977		
Hartmut Ganzke	SDP		Unna I	1966		
Katharina Gebauer	CDU		Rhein-Sieg-Kreis IV	1987		
Yvonne Gebauer	FDP		Party list	1966		
Heike Gebhard	SDP		Gelsenkirchen I	1954		
Jörg Geerlings	CDU		Rhein-Kreis Neuss I	1972		
Thomas Göddertz	SDP		Bottrop	1960		
Carina Gödecke	SDP		Bochum I	1958		
Matthias Goeken	CDU		Höxter	1964		
Gregor Golland	CDU		Rhein-Erft-Kreis III	1974		
Marcel Hafke	FDP		Party list	1982		
Daniel Hagemeier	CDU		Warendorf I	1970		
Gabriele Hammelrath	SDP		Köln III	1953		
Martina Hannen	FDP		Party list	1970		
Stephan Haupt	FDP		Party list	1970		
Wilhelm Hausmann	CDU		Party list	1970	Replaced Stefan Berger in July 2019 after he was elected an MEP	
Falk Heinrichs	SDP		Party list	1960	Replaced Hubertus Kramer after his death in 2022	
Henning Höne	FDP		Party list	1987		
Bernhard Hoppe-Biermeyer	CDU		Paderborn I	1961		
Josef Hovenjürgen	CDU		Recklinghausen IV	1963		
Michael Hübner	SDP		Recklinghausen III	1973		
Ralf Jäger	SDP		Duisburg III	1961		
Armin Jahl	SDP		Dortmund I	1947		
Wolfgang Jörg	SDP		Hagen I	1963		
Stefan Kämmerling	SDP		Aachen IV	1976		
Christina Kampmann	SDP		Bielefeld I	1980		
Lisa Kapteinat	SDP		Recklinghausen V	1989		
Andreas Keith	AfD		Party list	1967		
Matthias Kerkhoff	CDU		Hochsauerlandkreis II	1979		
Jochen Klenner	CDU		Mönchengladbach	1978		
Arndt Klocke	The Greens		Party list	1971		
Regina Kopp-Herr	SDP		Bielefeld II	1957		
Hans-Willi Körfges	SDP		Mönchengladbach I	1954		
Andreas Kossiski	SDP		Köln IV	1958		
Hannelore Kraft	SDP		Mülheim I	1961		
Oliver Krauß	CDU		Rhein-Sieg Kreis-Euskirchen III	1967		
André Kuper	CDU		Gütersloh III	1960		
Thomas Kutschaty	SDP		Essen I – Mülheim II	1968		
Lutz Lienenkämper	CDU		Rhein-Kreis Neuss III	1969		
Carsten Löcker	SDP		Recklinghausen II	1961		
Christian Loose	AfD		Party list	1975		
Bodo Löttgen	CDU		Oberbergischer Kreis II	1959		
Angela Lück	SDP		Herford II – Minden-Lübbecke IV	1959		
Nadja Lüders	SDP		Dortmund III	1970		
Dennis Maelzer	SDP		Lippe III	1980		
Mehrdad Mostofizadeh	The Greens		Party list	1969		
Marcus Optendrenk	CDU		Viersen II	1969		
Jochen Ott	SDP		Cologne V	1974		
Josefine Paul	The Greens		Party list	1982		
Romina Plonsker	CDU		Rhein-Erft-Kreis I	1988		
Marcus Pretzell	AfD		Party list	1973		
Charlotte Quik	CDU		Wesel III	1982		
Ernst-Wilhelm Rahe	SDP		Minden-Lübbecke I	1958	Rahe succeeded May 2019 Guido van den Berg	
Thorsten Schick	CDU		Märkischer Kreis I	1971		
Hendrik Schmitz	CDU		Aachen II	1978		
Marco Schmitz	CDU		Kreis I	1979		
Fabian Schrumpf	CDU		Essen IV	1982		
Christina Schulze Föcking	CDU		Steinfurt I	1976		
Daniel Sieveke	CDU		Paderborn II	1976		
Joachim Stamp	FDP		Party list	1970		
Sven Tritschler	AfD		Party list	1981		
Martin Vincentz	AfD		Party list	1986		
Markus Wagner	AfD		Party list	1964		
Hendrik Wüst	CDU		Borken I	1975		
Ibrahim Yetim	SDP		Wesel IV	1965		
Serdar Yüksel	SDP		Bochum III	1973		
Stefan Zimkeit	SDP		Oberhausen II-Wesel I	1964		

== Former members of the Landtag ==
Name	Party	Picture	Constituency	Born	Notes	Ref.
Hubertus Kramer	SDP		Hagen II – Ennepe-Ruhr-Kreis III	1959	Died in January 2022 and was replaced by Falk Heinrichs	
Armin Laschet	CDU		Aachen II	1961	Changed to Bundestag on October 27, 2021, followed by Rainer Spiecker	
Christian Lindner	FDP		Party list	1979	Changed to Bundestag on October 10, 2017, followed by Lorenz Deutsch	
Svenja Schulze	SDP		Party list	1968	Replaced by Inge Blask in March 2018 after she was made a federal minister.	
