= Bielefeld – Gütersloh II =

Federal electoral district of Germany

131 Bielefeld – Gütersloh II
- Electoral district for the Bundestag
- Bielefeld – Gütersloh II in 2025
- State: North Rhine-Westphalia
- Population: 345,300 (2019)
- Electorate: 243,059 (2017)
- Major settlements: Bielefeld
- Area: 294.3 km^{2}

Current electoral district
- Created: 1949
- Party: SPD
- Member: Wiebke Esdar
- Elected: 2017, 2021, 2025

Bielefeld – Gütersloh II is an electoral constituency (German: Wahlkreis) represented in the Bundestag. It elects one member via first-past-the-post voting. Under the current constituency numbering system, it is designated as constituency 131. It is located in eastern North Rhine-Westphalia, comprising the city of Bielefeld and a small part of the district of Gütersloh.

Bielefeld – Gütersloh II was created for the inaugural 1949 federal election. Since 2017, it has been represented by Wiebke Esdar of the Social Democratic Party (SPD).

== Geography ==
Bielefeld – Gütersloh II is located in eastern North Rhine-Westphalia. As of the 2021 federal election, it comprises the independent city of Bielefeld and the municipality of Werther from the Gütersloh district.

== History ==
Gütersloh I was created in 1949, then known as Bielefeld-Stadt. In the 1976 election, it was named Bielefeld II. From 1980 through 2009, it was named Bielefeld. It acquired its current name in the 2013 election. In the 1949 election, it was North Rhine-Westphalia constituency 47 in the numbering system. From 1949 through 1961, it was number 106. From 1965 through 1976, it was number 104. From 1980 through 1998, it was number 102. From 2002 through 2009, it was number 133. In the 2013 through 2021 elections, it was number 132. From the 2025 election, it has been number 131.

Originally, the constituency was coterminous with the independent city of Bielefeld. In the 1976 election, it was coterminous with Bielefeld excluding the former municipalities of Brackwede, Sennestadt, Senne, Gadderbaum, and Schröttinghausen. In the 1980 through 1994 elections, it was again coterminous with Bielefeld. In the 1998 election, it acquired the municipality of Werther.

| Election | No. | Name | Borders |
|---|---|---|---|
| 1949 | 47 | Bielefeld-Stadt | Bielefeld city |
| 1953 | 106 | Bielefeld-Stadt | Bielefeld city |
| 1957 | 106 | Bielefeld-Stadt | Bielefeld city |
| 1961 | 106 | Bielefeld-Stadt | Bielefeld city |
| 1965 | 104 | Bielefeld-Stadt | Bielefeld city |
| 1969 | 104 | Bielefeld-Stadt | Bielefeld city |
| 1972 | 104 | Bielefeld-Stadt | Bielefeld city |
| 1976 | 104 | Bielefeld II | Bielefeld city (excluding the former Brackwede, Sennestadt, Senne, Gadderbaum, and Schröttinghausen municipalities) |
| 1980 | 102 | Bielefeld | Bielefeld city |
| 1983 | 102 | Bielefeld | Bielefeld city |
| 1987 | 102 | Bielefeld | Bielefeld city |
| 1990 | 102 | Bielefeld | Bielefeld city |
| 1994 | 102 | Bielefeld | Bielefeld city |
| 1998 | 102 | Bielefeld | Bielefeld city; Gütersloh district (only Werther municipality) |
| 2002 | 133 | Bielefeld | Bielefeld city; Gütersloh district (only Werther municipality) |
| 2005 | 133 | Bielefeld | Bielefeld city; Gütersloh district (only Werther municipality) |
| 2009 | 133 | Bielefeld | Bielefeld city; Gütersloh district (only Werther municipality) |
| 2013 | 132 | Bielefeld – Gütersloh II | Bielefeld city; Gütersloh district (only Werther municipality) |
| 2017 | 132 | Bielefeld – Gütersloh II | Bielefeld city; Gütersloh district (only Werther municipality) |
| 2021 | 132 | Bielefeld – Gütersloh II | Bielefeld city; Gütersloh district (only Werther municipality) |
| 2025 | 131 | Bielefeld – Gütersloh II | Bielefeld city; Gütersloh district (only Werther municipality) |

== Members ==
The constituency has been held by the Social Democratic Party (SPD) during all but two Bundestag terms since 1949. It was first represented by Friederike Nadig of the SPD from 1949 to 1953, followed by Artur Ladebeck and Otto Walpert for a single term each. Gerhard Koch served three terms from 1961 to 1972, followed by Elfriede Eilers until 1980. Kurt Vogelsang then served a single term before Reinhard Meyer zu Bentrup of the Christian Democratic Union (CDU) was elected. Günter Rixe regained the constituency for the SPD in 1987 and served until 1998. Rainer Wend served from then to 2009, when Lena Strothmann of the CDU won the constituency. Christina Kampmann regained it for the SPD in 2013. Wiebke Esdar was elected in 2017 and re-elected in 2021 and 2025.

| Election | Member | Party | % |
|---|---|---|---|
| 1949 | Friederike Nadig | SPD | 44.8 |
| 1953 | Artur Ladebeck | SPD | 41.8 |
| 1957 | Otto Walpert | SPD | 42.5 |
| 1961 | Gerhard Koch | SPD | 45.7 |
| 1965 | Gerhard Koch | SPD | 49.2 |
| 1969 | Gerhard Koch | SPD | 52.2 |
| 1972 | Elfriede Eilers | SPD | 53.4 |
| 1976 | Elfriede Eilers | SPD | 47.5 |
| 1980 | Kurt Vogelsang | SPD | 48.7 |
| 1983 | Reinhard Meyer zu Bentrup | CDU | 46.6 |
| 1987 | Günter Rixe | SPD | 43.0 |
| 1990 | Günter Rixe | SPD | 42.8 |
| 1994 | Günter Rixe | SPD | 46.8 |
| 1998 | Rainer Wend | SPD | 50.2 |
| 2002 | Rainer Wend | SPD | 49.8 |
| 2005 | Rainer Wend | SPD | 47.2 |
| 2009 | Lena Strothmann | CDU | 36.3 |
| 2013 | Christina Kampmann | SPD | 38.1 |
| 2017 | Wiebke Esdar | SPD | 33.2 |
| 2021 | Wiebke Esdar | SPD | 30.0 |
| 2025 | Wiebke Esdar | SPD | 27.2 |

== Election results ==
=== 2025 election ===
Federal election (2025): Bielefeld – Gütersloh II
| Notes: | Blue background denotes the winner of the electorate vote. Pink background denotes a candidate elected from their party list. Yellow background denotes an electorate win by a list member, or other incumbent. A ✓ or ✗ denotes status of any incumbent, win or lose respectively. | | | | | | |
| Party | Candidate | Votes | % | ±% | Party votes | % | ±% |
|---|---|---|---|---|---|---|---|
| SPD | ✓ Wiebke Esdar | 53,131 | 27.2 | ▼2.8 | 39,841 | 20.3 | ▼6.8 |
| CDU | Katharina Kotulla | 50,740 | 26.0 | ▲3.7 | 45,716 | 23.3 | ▲3.1 |
| Greens | Britta Haßelmann | 31,273 | 16.0 | ▼5.8 | 32,373 | 16.5 | ▼5.3 |
| AfD | Maximilian Kneller | 27,994 | 14.3 | ▲7.6 | 28,142 | 14.4 | ▲7.6 |
| Left | Onur Ocak | 19,803 | 10.1 | ▲4.7 | 25,810 | 13.2 | ▲7.0 |
| BSW | | | | | 8,921 | 4.6 | |
| FDP | Gregor vom Braucke | 5,930 | 3.0 | ▼6.6 | 8,168 | 4.2 | ▼7.0 |
| PARTEI | Lena Oberbäumer | 3,095 | 1.6 | ▼0.6 | 1,364 | 0.7 | ▼0.6 |
| Tierschutzpartei | | | | | 1,915 | 1.0 | 0.0 |
| Volt | Luis-Aron Wulfert | 1,882 | 1.0 | ▲0.5 | 1,300 | 0.7 | ▲0.3 |
| Team Todenhöfer | Birte Döpke | 1,548 | 0.8 | | 598 | 0.3 | ▼0.6 |
| FW | | | | | 516 | 0.3 | ▼0.1 |
| dieBasis | | | | ▼1.4 | 408 | 0.2 | ▼1.0 |
| PdF | | | | | 327 | 0.2 | ▲0.1 |
| BD | | | | | 210 | 0.1 | |
| Values | | | | | 124 | 0.1 | |
| MERA25 | | | | | 98 | 0.1 | |
| MLPD | | | | ▼0.1 | 60 | 0.0 | 0.0 |
| Pirates | | | | | | | ▼0.4 |
| Bündnis C | | | | | | | ▼0.2 |
| Gesundheitsforschung | | | | | | | ▼0.1 |
| ÖDP | | | | | | | ▼0.1 |
| Humanists | | | | | | | ▼0.1 |
| SGP | | | | | | | 0.0 |
| Informal votes | | 1,643 | | | 1,148 | | |
| Total valid votes | | 195,396 | | | 195,891 | | |
| Turnout | | 197,039 | 81.9 | ▲5.7 | | | |
| SPD hold | Majority | 2,391 | 1.2 | | | | |

=== 2021 election ===
Federal election (2021): Bielefeld – Gütersloh II
| Notes: | Blue background denotes the winner of the electorate vote. Pink background denotes a candidate elected from their party list. Yellow background denotes an electorate win by a list member, or other incumbent. A ✓ or ✗ denotes status of any incumbent, win or lose respectively. | | | | | | |
| Party | Candidate | Votes | % | ±% | Party votes | % | ±% |
|---|---|---|---|---|---|---|---|
| SPD | ✓ Wiebke Esdar | 55,234 | 30.0 | ▼3.1 | 50,009 | 27.2 | ▲1.8 |
| CDU | Angelika Westerwelle | 40,928 | 22.3 | ▼8.4 | 37,355 | 20.3 | ▼7.3 |
| Greens | Britta Haßelmann | 40,015 | 21.8 | ▲12.1 | 40,161 | 21.8 | ▲10.7 |
| FDP | Jan Maik Schlifter | 17,793 | 9.7 | ▲2.3 | 20,658 | 11.2 | ▼0.4 |
| AfD | Maximilian Kneller | 12,294 | 6.7 | ▼1.5 | 12,448 | 6.8 | ▼2.2 |
| Left | Friedrich Straetmanns | 9,905 | 5.4 | ▼3.6 | 11,462 | 6.2 | ▼4.9 |
| PARTEI | Tjark Nitsche | 3,966 | 2.2 | ▲0.3 | 2,324 | 1.3 | ▲0.1 |
| dieBasis | Jürgen Wächter | 2,655 | 1.4 | | 2,274 | 1.2 | |
| Tierschutzpartei | | | | | 1,872 | 1.0 | ▲0.4 |
| Team Todenhöfer | | | | | 1,591 | 0.9 | |
| Volt | Stefan Upmeier zu Belzen | 921 | 0.5 | | 720 | 0.4 | |
| Pirates | | | | | 683 | 0.4 | ▼0.1 |
| FW | | | | | 697 | 0.4 | ▲0.2 |
| Bündnis C | | | | | 336 | 0.2 | |
| Gesundheitsforschung | | | | | 219 | 0.1 | 0.0 |
| ÖDP | | | | | 197 | 0.1 | 0.0 |
| LIEBE | | | | | 187 | 0.1 | |
| LfK | | | | | 186 | 0.1 | |
| Humanists | | | | | 156 | 0.1 | 0.0 |
| NPD | | | | | 120 | 0.1 | ▼0.1 |
| V-Partei3 | | | | | 117 | 0.1 | ▼0.1 |
| du. | | | | | 105 | 0.1 | |
| MLPD | Reinhard Schultka | 153 | 0.1 | ▼0.1 | 88 | 0.0 | 0.0 |
| PdF | | | | | 77 | 0.0 | |
| DKP | | | | | 64 | 0.0 | 0.0 |
| LKR | | | | | 32 | 0.0 | |
| SGP | | | | | 25 | 0.0 | 0.0 |
| Informal votes | | 1,481 | | | 1,182 | | |
| Total valid votes | | 183,864 | | | 184,163 | | |
| Turnout | | 185,345 | 76.3 | ▲0.6 | | | |
| SPD hold | Majority | 14,306 | 7.7 | ▲5.3 | | | |

=== 2017 election ===
Federal election (2017): Bielefeld – Gütersloh II
| Notes: | Blue background denotes the winner of the electorate vote. Pink background denotes a candidate elected from their party list. Yellow background denotes an electorate win by a list member, or other incumbent. A ✓ or ✗ denotes status of any incumbent, win or lose respectively. | | | | | | |
| Party | Candidate | Votes | % | ±% | Party votes | % | ±% |
|---|---|---|---|---|---|---|---|
| SPD | Wiebke Esdar | 61,086 | 33.2 | ▼4.9 | 46,883 | 25.4 | ▼7.2 |
| CDU | Michael Weber | 56,485 | 30.7 | ▼6.6 | 50,995 | 27.6 | ▼7.7 |
| Greens | Britta Haßelmann | 17,728 | 9.6 | ▼1.1 | 20,567 | 11.1 | ▼0.5 |
| Left | Friedrich Straetmanns | 16,489 | 9.0 | ▲2.1 | 20,522 | 11.1 | ▲2.7 |
| AfD | Johannes Brinkrolf | 15,028 | 8.2 | ▲5.7 | 16,514 | 8.9 | ▲5.5 |
| FDP | Jasmin Wahl-Schwentker | 13,495 | 7.3 | ▲5.3 | 21,364 | 11.6 | ▲7.6 |
| PARTEI | Lena Oberbäumer | 3,473 | 1.9 | | 2,168 | 1.2 | ▲0.8 |
| Tierschutzpartei | | | | | 1,092 | 0.6 | |
| AD-DEMOKRATEN | | | | | 1,039 | 0.6 | |
| Pirates | | | | | 938 | 0.5 | ▼1.9 |
| FW | | | | | 388 | 0.2 | ▲0.1 |
| DiB | | | | | 293 | 0.2 | |
| NPD | | | | | 289 | 0.2 | ▼0.5 |
| BGE | | | | | 263 | 0.1 | |
| V-Partei³ | | | | | 244 | 0.1 | |
| DM | | | | | 235 | 0.1 | |
| ÖDP | | | | | 201 | 0.1 | 0.0 |
| MLPD | Wolfgang Wöhrmann | 293 | 0.2 | | 142 | 0.1 | 0.0 |
| Volksabstimmung | | | | | 141 | 0.1 | ▼0.1 |
| Gesundheitsforschung | | | | | 138 | 0.1 | |
| Die Humanisten | | | | | 125 | 0.1 | |
| DKP | | | | | 47 | 0.0 | |
| SGP | | | | | 28 | 0.0 | 0.0 |
| Informal votes | | 2,075 | | | 1,536 | | |
| Total valid votes | | 184,077 | | | 184,616 | | |
| Turnout | | 186,152 | 75.6 | ▲2.9 | | | |
| SPD hold | Majority | 4,601 | 2.5 | ▲1.7 | | | |

=== 2013 election ===
Federal election (2013): Bielefeld – Gütersloh II
| Notes: | Blue background denotes the winner of the electorate vote. Pink background denotes a candidate elected from their party list. Yellow background denotes an electorate win by a list member, or other incumbent. A ✓ or ✗ denotes status of any incumbent, win or lose respectively. | | | | | | |
| Party | Candidate | Votes | % | ±% | Party votes | % | ±% |
|---|---|---|---|---|---|---|---|
| SPD | Christina Kampmann | 67,464 | 38.1 | ▲3.6 | 57,931 | 32.6 | ▲2.6 |
| CDU | ✗ Lena Strothmann | 66,021 | 37.3 | ▲1.0 | 62,698 | 35.3 | ▲4.9 |
| Greens | Britta Haßelmann | 19,026 | 10.7 | ▼3.3 | 20,711 | 11.7 | ▼2.4 |
| Left | Frank Schwarzer | 12,153 | 6.9 | ▼1.0 | 14,869 | 8.4 | ▼1.2 |
| Pirates | Lars Büsing | 4,564 | 2.6 | | 4,189 | 2.4 | ▲0.4 |
| AfD | Marcus Pretzell | 4,398 | 2.5 | | 6,076 | 3.4 | |
| FDP | Jasmin Wahl-Schwentker | 3,523 | 2.0 | ▼4.1 | 7,055 | 4.0 | ▼7.2 |
| NPD | | | | | 1,233 | 0.7 | ▼0.1 |
| PARTEI | | | | | 741 | 0.4 | |
| PRO | | | | | 336 | 0.2 | |
| Volksabstimmung | | | | | 315 | 0.2 | ▲0.1 |
| ÖDP | | | | | 280 | 0.2 | ▲0.1 |
| FW | | | | | 226 | 0.1 | |
| BIG | | | | | 190 | 0.1 | |
| Nichtwahler | | | | | 190 | 0.1 | |
| REP | | | | | 131 | 0.1 | ▼0.1 |
| MLPD | | | | | 97 | 0.1 | 0.0 |
| Party of Reason | | | | | 93 | 0.1 | |
| RRP | | | | | 63 | 0.0 | ▼0.1 |
| PSG | | | | | 51 | 0.0 | 0.0 |
| BüSo | | | | | 39 | 0.0 | 0.0 |
| Die Rechte | | | | | 34 | 0.0 | |
| Informal votes | | 2,476 | | | 2,077 | | |
| Total valid votes | | 177,149 | | | 177,548 | | |
| Turnout | | 179,625 | 72.7 | ▼0.4 | | | |
| SPD gain from CDU | Majority | 1,443 | 0.8 | | | | |

=== 2009 election ===
Federal election (2009): Bielefeld
| Notes: | Blue background denotes the winner of the electorate vote. Pink background denotes a candidate elected from their party list. Yellow background denotes an electorate win by a list member, or other incumbent. A ✓ or ✗ denotes status of any incumbent, win or lose respectively. | | | | | | |
| Party | Candidate | Votes | % | ±% | Party votes | % | ±% |
|---|---|---|---|---|---|---|---|
| CDU | Lena Strothmann | 64,621 | 36.3 | ▼1.5 | 54,277 | 30.4 | ▼1.3 |
| SPD | Guntram Schneider | 61,405 | 34.5 | ▼12.8 | 53,583 | 30.0 | ▼9.1 |
| Greens | Britta Haßelmann | 24,981 | 14.0 | ▲7.5 | 25,057 | 14.0 | ▲2.1 |
| Left | Frank Schwarzer | 14,056 | 7.9 | ▲3.7 | 17,126 | 9.6 | ▲3.6 |
| FDP | Hans-Achim von Stockhausen | 10,852 | 6.1 | ▲3.4 | 19,883 | 11.1 | ▲2.6 |
| Pirates | | | | | 3,497 | 2.0 | |
| NPD | Siegfried Reball | 1,784 | 1.0 | ▲0.2 | 1,453 | 0.8 | ▲0.1 |
| Tierschutzpartei | | | | | 956 | 0.5 | ▲0.1 |
| FAMILIE | | | | | 755 | 0.4 | ▲0.1 |
| RENTNER | | | | | 551 | 0.3 | |
| REP | | | | | 311 | 0.2 | 0.0 |
| RRP | | | | | 190 | 0.1 | |
| ÖDP | | | | | 179 | 0.1 | |
| Volksabstimmung | | | | | 132 | 0.1 | 0.0 |
| DVU | | | | | 120 | 0.1 | |
| BüSo | Paul Giebeler | 394 | 0.2 | | 100 | 0.1 | 0.0 |
| MLPD | | | | | 68 | 0.0 | 0.0 |
| Centre | | | | | 67 | 0.0 | 0.0 |
| PSG | | | | | 45 | 0.0 | 0.0 |
| Informal votes | | 2,348 | | | 2,091 | | |
| Total valid votes | | 178,093 | | | 178,350 | | |
| Turnout | | 180,441 | 73.0 | ▼7.0 | | | |
| CDU gain from SPD | Majority | 3,216 | 1.8 | | | | |

=== 2005 election ===
Federal election (2005): Bielefeld
| Notes: | Blue background denotes the winner of the electorate vote. Pink background denotes a candidate elected from their party list. Yellow background denotes an electorate win by a list member, or other incumbent. A ✓ or ✗ denotes status of any incumbent, win or lose respectively. | | | | | | |
| Party | Candidate | Votes | % | ±% | Party votes | % | ±% |
|---|---|---|---|---|---|---|---|
| SPD | ✓ Rainer Wend | 92,287 | 47.2 | ▼2.6 | 76,549 | 39.2 | ▼2.4 |
| CDU | Lena Strothmann | 73,853 | 37.8 | ▲1.8 | 62,089 | 31.8 | ▼0.2 |
| Greens | Britta Haßelmann | 12,742 | 6.5 | ▼0.1 | 23,358 | 12.0 | ▼2.1 |
| Left | Brigitte Stelze | 8,281 | 4.2 | ▲2.6 | 11,648 | 6.0 | ▲4.1 |
| FDP | Bodo Ungerechts | 5,253 | 2.7 | ▼2.3 | 16,643 | 8.5 | ▲0.6 |
| NPD | Nico Wedding | 1,563 | 0.8 | | 1,365 | 0.7 | ▲0.4 |
| PBC | Thorsten Zuckerstätter | 860 | 0.4 | | 763 | 0.4 | ▲0.1 |
| Tierschutzpartei | | | | | 827 | 0.4 | ▲0.1 |
| Familie | | | | | 688 | 0.4 | ▲0.2 |
| GRAUEN | | | | | 586 | 0.3 | ▲0.1 |
| Independent | Johannes Ziolkowski | 505 | 0.3 | | | | |
| REP | | | | | 374 | 0.2 | ▼0.1 |
| From Now on... Democracy Through Referendum | | | | | 232 | 0.1 | |
| Socialist Equality Party | | | | | 82 | 0.0 | |
| MLPD | | | | | 81 | 0.0 | |
| Centre | | | | | 44 | 0.0 | |
| BüSo | | | | | 41 | 0.0 | 0.0 |
| Informal votes | | 2,868 | | | 2,842 | | |
| Total valid votes | | 195,344 | | | 195,370 | | |
| Turnout | | 198,212 | 80.0 | ▼9.3 | | | |
| SPD hold | Majority | 18,434 | 9.4 | | | | |
