= Białas =

Białas (Polish pronunciation: [ˈbjawas]), Bialas, or Biallas is a Polish-language surname. The Polish word białas means "white-haired man" and comes from the adjective biały ("white"). The surname is the same for males and females. It may refer to:

- Andreas Bialas (born 1968), German politician
- Arthur Bialas (1930–2012), German footballer
- Czesław Białas (1931–1991), Polish weightlifter
- Dave Bialas (born 1954), American baseball player and coach
- Edmund Białas (1919–1991), Polish footballer
- Günter Bialas (1907–1995), German composer
- Hans Biallas (1918–2009), German footballer
- Kamil Białas (born 1991), Polish figure skater
- Magdalena Białas (born 1962), Polish swimmer
- Sebastian Białas (born 1990), Polish footballer
- Stefan Białas (born 1948), Polish footballer
- Valentine Bialas (1903–1965), American speed skater
- Wolfram Bialas (1935–1998), German chess player
