= Inge Blask =

German politician

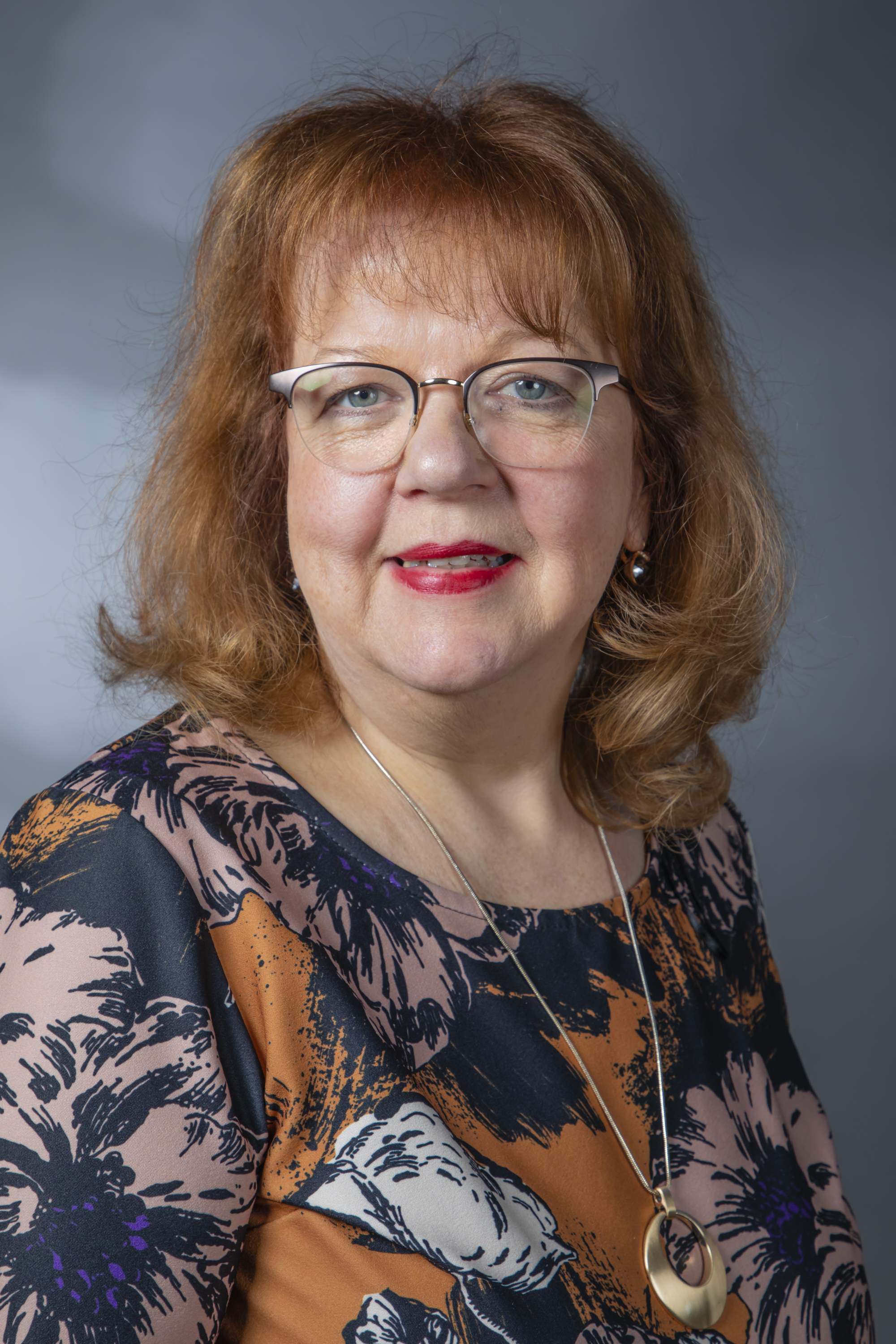
- Inge Blask in 2019

Member of the Landtag of North Rhine-Westphalia
- Incumbent
- Assumed office 2018
- In office 2012–2017

Personal details
- Born: 26 November 1959 (age 66) Castrop-Rauxel, Germany
- Party: Social Democratic Party of Germany

Inge Blask (born 26 November 1959) is a German politician from the Social Democratic Party. She has been a member of the Landtag of North Rhine-Westphalia since 2018, having previously served from 2012 to 2017.

== Biography ==
After graduating from vocational high school in 1979, Inge Blask studied nutritional science for four years at Münster University of Applied Sciences. She received her diploma in 1983 and began her professional career at the Consumer Advice Center of North Rhine-Westphalia. She initially worked as a consultant, later managed the office in Iserlohn, and served as regional director from 1990 to 2012. In 2017/2018, she was a research associate responsible for coordinating volunteer work and the support association at the Consumer Advice Center of North Rhine-Westphalia.

Her political career began in local politics after joining the SPD in 1985. Between 1989 and 1999, Inge Blask was a member of the district council of the Märkischer Kreis. She has been a member of the Hemer city council since 2004, and since the 2009 local elections, she has served as deputy chair of the SPD parliamentary group and spokesperson for education policy. She was elected as an assessor to the executive committee of both the SPD local branch in Hemer and the SPD sub-district of Märkischer Kreis, to which she belonged until 2019. She also holds the position of assessor in the Working Group of Social Democratic Women and on the regional executive committee of the SPD in the Westliches Westfalen district. In May 2012, Blask was elected as an assessor to the federal executive committee of the Working Group of Social Democratic Women. Furthermore, since 2018, she has been deputy chair of the state executive committee of the Working Group of the ASF in North Rhine-Westphalia.

After winning an internal SPD nomination against the incumbent state parliament member Jürgen Antoni, she ran as the SPD's direct candidate for the constituency of Märkischer Kreis II in the 2010 North Rhine-Westphalia state election against Wolfgang Exler (CDU), Peter Köhler (Greens), and Markus Sälzer (FDP). She came in second with 35.3 percent of the vote, while the direct mandate went to Wolfgang Exler. In the 2012 North Rhine-Westphalia state election, she was again elected as the SPD's direct candidate in her constituency. With 38.8 percent of the first-preference votes, she narrowly won the constituency this time against Exler, who received 38.3%. In the 2017 state election, she lost her direct candidacy in the constituency to the CDU candidate Marco Voge,

initially left the state parliament and on 19 March 2018 entered the state parliament via the state list to replace the departing member Svenja Schulze. In the 2022 state election, she achieved a first-vote result of 30.2% and entered the state parliament in 4th place on the state list.

== See also ==
- List of members of the Landtag of North Rhine-Westphalia 2017–2022
