= Wiebke Esdar =

German psychologist and politician (born 1984)

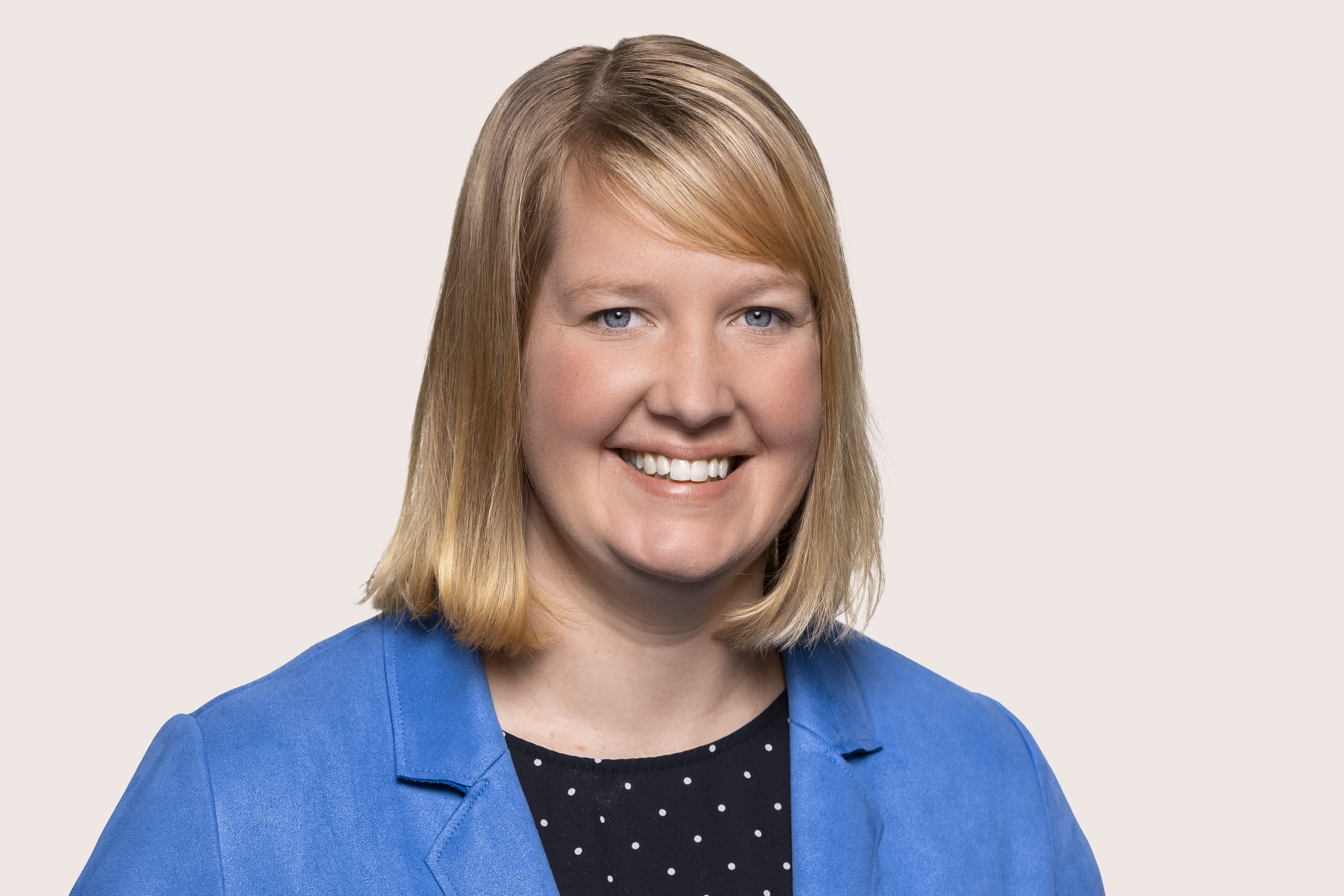
- Esdar 2021

Member of the Bundestag for Bielefeld – Gütersloh II
- Incumbent
- Assumed office 24 September 2017
- Preceded by: Christina Kampmann

Personal details
- Born: 11 February 1984 (age 42) Bielefeld, West Germany (now Germany)
- Party: SPD
- Education: Bielefeld University

Wiebke Esdar (born 11 February 1984) is a German psychologist and politician of the Social Democratic Party (SPD). She has been a member of the Bundestag since the 2017 election, when she won the constituency of Bielefeld – Gütersloh II with 33.2% of the votes.

== Early life and education ==
Esdar was born in Bielefeld. She studied psychology, social sciences and history at Bielefeld University and received her PhD degree in psychology in 2015.

== Political career ==
=== Career in local politics ===
Esdar has been a member of the SPD since 2005 and became the chairwoman of the SPD in Bielefeld in 2016.

=== Member of the German Parliament, 2017–present ===
Esdar has been a member of the German Bundestag since the 2017 elections, representing Bielefeld and Gütersloh. In parliament, served on the Finance Committee and the Committee on Education, Research and Technology Assessment from 2018 to 2021. In this capacity, she was her parliamentary group's rapporteur on universities. Since 2021, she has been part of the Budget Committee and the Audit Committee. In 2022, she also joined the parliamentary body charged with overseeing a 100 billion euro special fund to strengthen Germany's armed forces.

Within the SPD parliamentary group, Esdar belongs to the Parliamentary Left, a left-wing movement; she has been co-chairing the group since 2022, alongside Matthias Miersch and Sönke Rix. Since 2023, she has been leading the Bundestag group of SPD parliamentarians from North Rhine-Westphalia, the largest delegation within the party's parliamentary group, alongside Dirk Wiese.

In the negotiations to form a so-called traffic light coalition of the SPD, the Green Party and the Free Democrats (FDP) following the 2021 German elections, Esdar was part of her party's delegation in the working group on innovation and research, co-chaired by Thomas Losse-Müller, Katharina Fegebank and Lydia Hüskens.

Since 2025, Esdar has been serving as deputy chair of her parliamentary group, under the leadership of chairman Matthias Miersch. In this capacity, she oversees the group's legislative activities on the national budget, research, media and cultural affairs.

== Other activities ==
=== Corporate boards ===
- Stadtwerke Bielefeld, Member of the Supervisory Board
- Stadtwerke Gütersloh, Member of the Supervisory Board

=== Non-profit organizations ===
- Leibniz Association, Member of the Senate (since 2022)
- Vietnamese-German University (VGU), Member of the University Council (since 2022)
- Business Forum of the Social Democratic Party of Germany, Member of the Advisory Board on Economic Policy (since 2020)
- Education and Science Workers' Union (GEW), Member
- IG Metall, Member
- Arminia Bielefeld, Member

== Personal life ==
Esdar is married to fellow SPD politician Veith Lemmen. They have a son.
