= Gabriele Hammelrath =

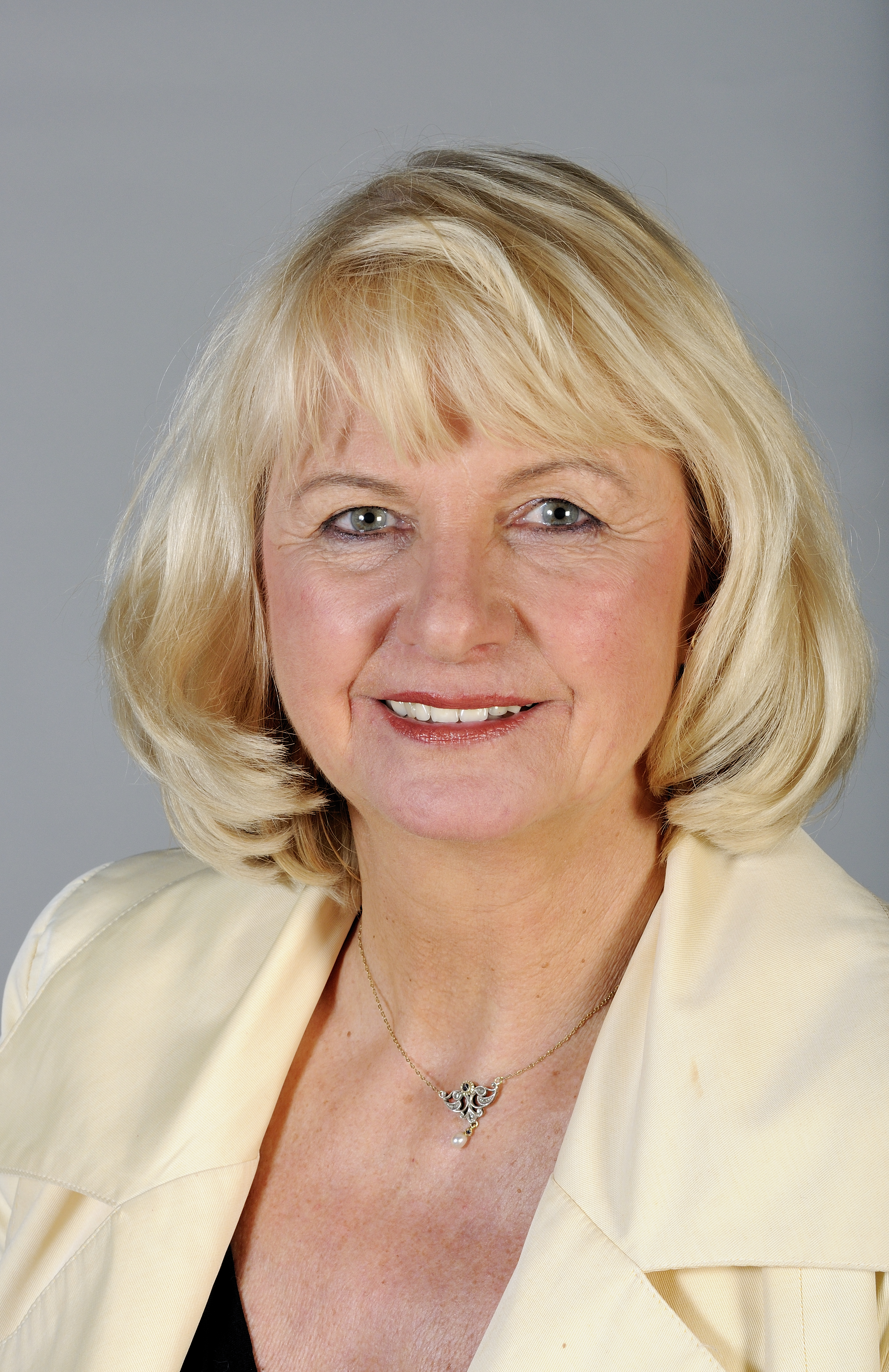
- Gabriele Hammelrath in 2013

Member of the Landtag of North Rhine-Westphalia
- In office 2012–2022

Personal details
- Born: 10 March 1953 (age 73) Leverkusen, Germany
- Party: Social Democratic Party of Germany

Gabriele Hammelrath (born 10 March 1953) is a German educator and politician from the Social Democratic Party. She was a member of the Landtag of North Rhine-Westphalia from 2012 to 2022.

== Biography ==
After graduating from Marienschule Opladen in 1971, Gabriele Hammelrath studied education, psychology, and sociology at the University of Cologne, graduating with a diploma in education. Her diploma thesis dealt with the topic of marriage in industrial society. From 1980 to 1985, she worked in management consulting in the areas of human resources, organization, and marketing. Since 1985, she has worked at the Cologne Adult Education Center, and from 2005 until May 31, 2012, she was head of the City of Cologne's Office for Continuing Education. Hammelrath is married, has a daughter and lives with her family in Cologne-Ehrenfeld.

== Political career ==
She has been a member of the ÖTV trade union (now ver.di) since 1976. She joined the SPD in 1978. During this time, she served for seven years as the local SPD chair in Cologne-Ehrenfeld. She was the subdistrict chair of the Working Group of Social Democratic Women (ASF) in Cologne for eight years. Since 2007, she has been the deputy chair of the SPD subdistrict in Cologne. In the 2012 and 2017 North Rhine-Westphalia state elections, she won the direct mandate in the Cologne III constituency. From May 31, 2012, to May 31, 2022, she was a member of the Landtag of North Rhine-Westphalia. She served on several parliamentary committees. In 2013, Hammelrath was appointed as a deputy member of the North Rhine-Westphalia Constitutional Commission, which convened on November 19, 2013, and focused on reforming the North Rhine-Westphalian constitution. In 2024, she became the new chair of the ARD Program Advisory Board.

== Literature ==
- Jörg Löbker: Porträt: Gabriele Hammelrath (SPD), in: Landtag intern, Ausgabe 8 vom 13. Oktober 2020, S. 19

== See also ==
- List of members of the Landtag of North Rhine-Westphalia 2017–2022
