= Heike Gebhard =

German politician

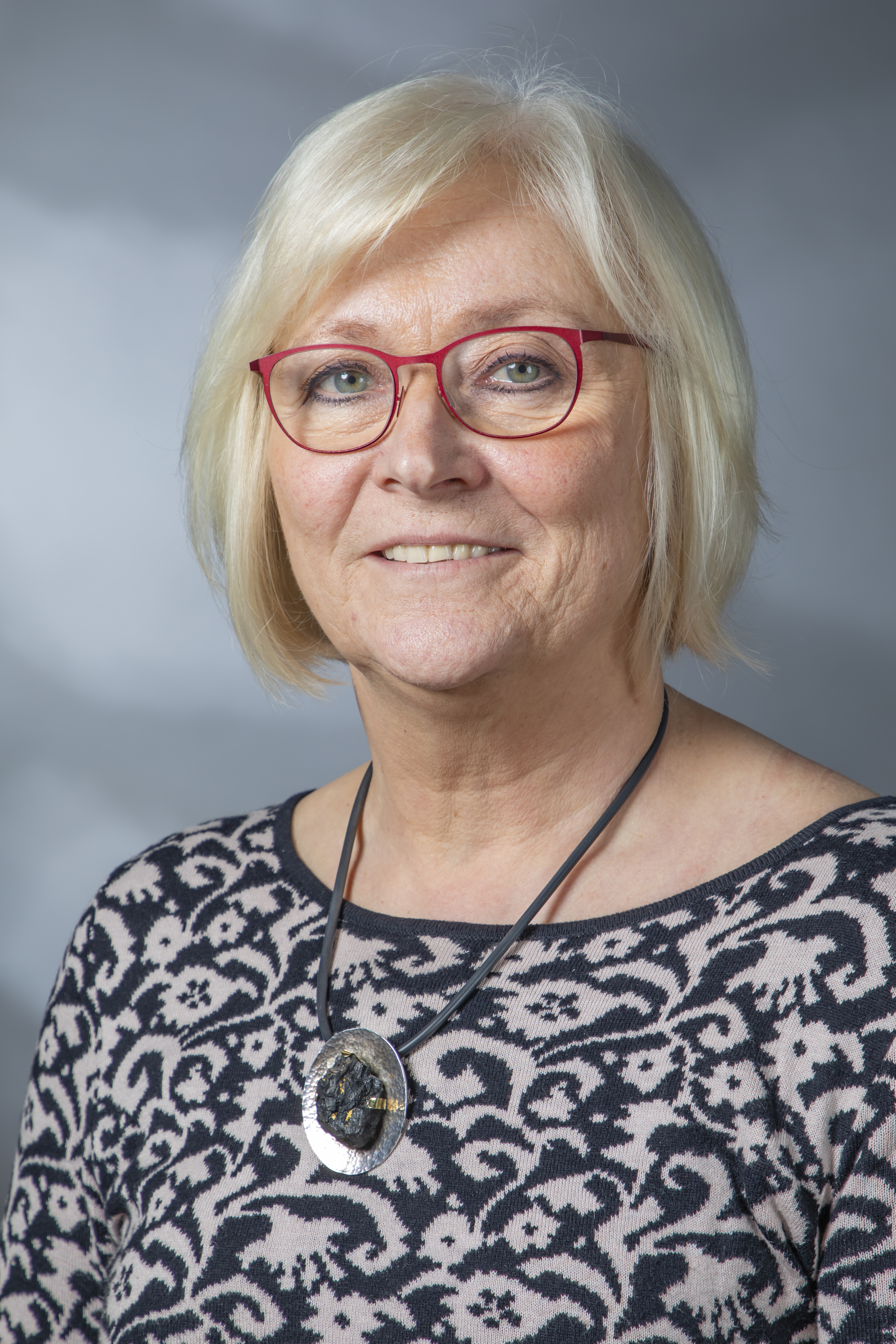
- Heike Gebhard in 2019

Member of the Landtag of North Rhine-Westphalia
- In office 2005–2022

Personal details
- Born: 22 March 1954 (age 72) Gelsenkirchen, Germany
- Party: Social Democratic Party of Germany
- Education: Ruhr University Bochum

Heike Gebhard (born 22 March 1954) is a German politician from the Social Democratic Party. She was a member of the Landtag of North Rhine-Westphalia for Gelsenkirchen I from 2005 to 2022.

== Early life and career ==
Heike Gebhard graduated from the Annette-von-Droste-Hülshoff-Gymnasium in Gelsenkirchen in 1972. From 1972 to 1979, she studied mathematics and economics at Ruhr University Bochum, graduating in 1979 with a diploma in mathematics. From 1979 to 1983, she worked as a research assistant and personal advisor to the rector of the University of Essen. In 1983, Heike Gebhard was appointed head of department at the Hans-Böckler-Stiftung, a position she held until 1991. Since 1998, Heike Gebhard has worked as a research associate at the University of Duisburg-Essen and as managing director of the Essen College for Gender Studies. She is currently on leave to fulfil her duties as a member of the state parliament. Gebhard is married and has four children.

== Party and organizations ==
Heike Gebhard has been a member of the SPD since 1972. In 1974, she was deputy chair of the Young Socialists (Jusos) in the Gelsenkirchen subdistrict of the SPD. From 1977 to 1980, she chaired the state association of the Young Socialists in North Rhine-Westphalia. She was a member of the executive committee of the Gelsenkirchen SPD subdistrict from 1975 to 1985, from 1992 to 1994, and again since 1996.

From 2006 to 2010, Heike Gebhard was deputy chair of the Gelsenkirchen SPD. She has been chair of the Working Group of Social Democratic Women (ASF) in Gelsenkirchen since 2006, chair of the Western Westphalia region since 2007, and a member of the AsF's state executive committee in North Rhine-Westphalia since 2006. On 13 March 2010, she was elected chair of the Gelsenkirchen SPD with 94.9% of the vote.

Heike Gebhard volunteers on the supervisory board of the Catholic Clinics Emscher Lippe (KKEL) and is a member of the sub-district board of the Arbeiterwohlfahrt (AWO) Gelsenkirchen/Bottrop. She is also a member of the ver.di trade union. In 2025, the SPD Gelsenkirchen awarded Gebhard the Willy Brandt Medal.

== Mandate ==
Prior to her work as a member of the state parliament, Heike Gebhard was a member of the advisory board for the homeless and refugees of the Gelsenkirchen city council.

Heike Gebhard was a member of the Landtag of North Rhine-Westphalia from 2005 to 2022. She chaired the Committee on Labor, Health and Social Affairs. She was also a member of the Budget and Finance Committee.

== See also ==
- List of members of the Landtag of North Rhine-Westphalia 2017–2022
