= Michael Hübner (politician) =

German politician (born 1973)

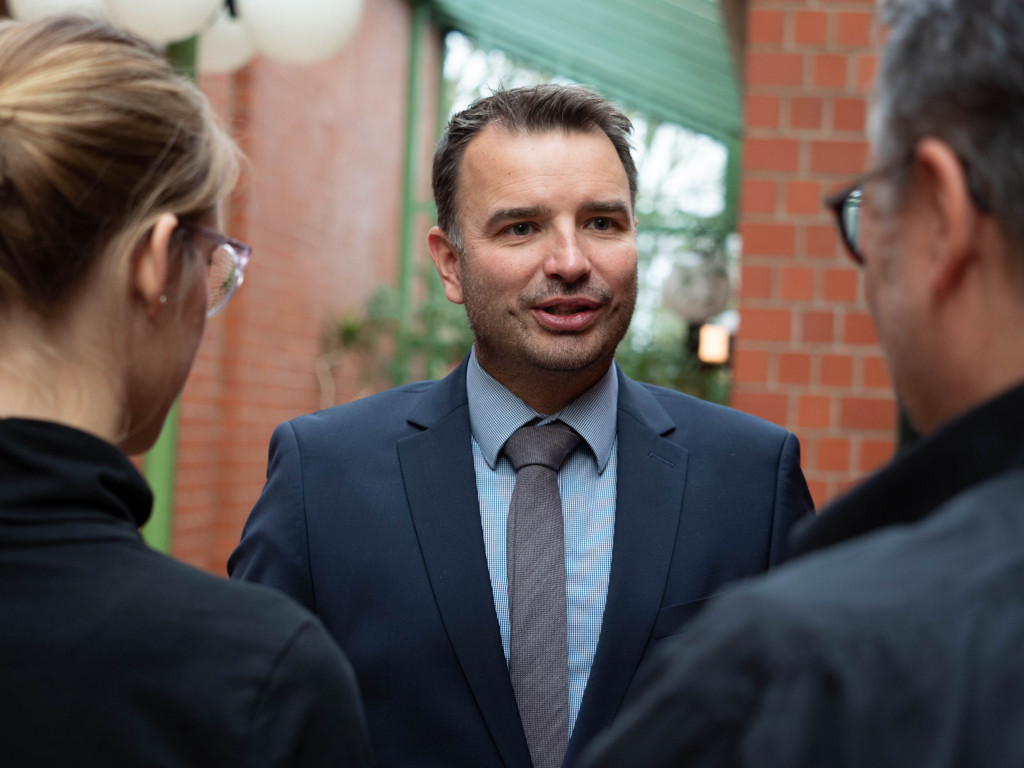
- Hübner in 2019

Member of the Landtag of North Rhine-Westphalia
- In office 9 June 2010 – 29 June 2022
- Preceded by: Wolfgang Röken
- Succeeded by: Josef Hovenjürgen
- Constituency: Recklinghausen III

Personal details
- Born: 30 April 1973 (age 53)
- Party: Social Democratic Party (since 1993)

Michael Ralf Hübner (born 30 April 1973) is a German politician. From 2010 to 2022, he was a member of the Landtag of North Rhine-Westphalia. From 2015 to 2022, he served as deputy group leader of the Social Democratic Party.
