= Carmen Wegge =

German politician

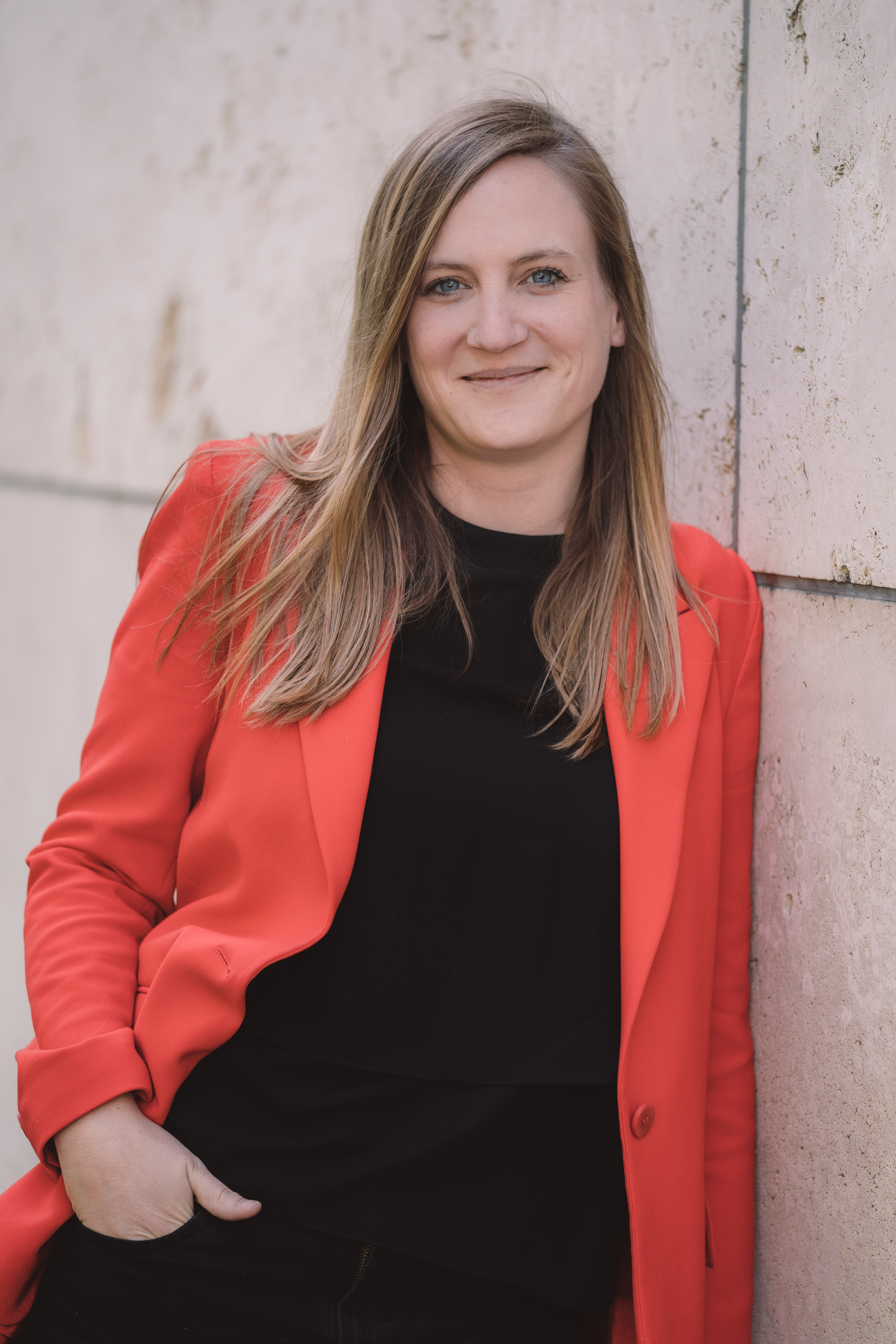

Member of the Bundestag
- Incumbent
- Assumed office 2021

Personal details
- Born: 24 September 1989 (age 37) Hattingen, West Germany (now Germany)
- Party: Social Democratic
- Education: LMU Munich

Carmen Wegge (born 24 September 1989) is a German politician of the Social Democratic Party (SPD) who has been serving as a member of the Bundestag since 2021. She is the chair of SPD Women.

== Early life and education ==
Wegge was born in 1989 in the West German town of Hattingen and studied law at LMU Munich. During her studies, she lived in Barbados for three months.

== Political career ==
Wegge joined the SPD in 2005 and became a member of the Bundestag in 2021, representing the Starnberg – Landsberg am Lech district.

In parliament, Wegge has since been serving on the Committee on Internal Affairs and the Committee on Legal Affairs. In this capacity, she is her parliamentary group's rapporteur on the legalization of cannabis, gun control, explosives, cybercrime, surveillance instruments and powers, data protection, freedom of information, assisted suicide, gender equality, violence against women, and gender representation on corporate boards, among others. Since the 2025 elections, she has been her parliamentary group's spokesperson on legal affairs and consumer protection. She also serves on the parliamentary body in charge of appointing judges to the Highest Courts of Justice, namely the Federal Court of Justice (BGH), the Federal Administrative Court (BVerwG), the Federal Fiscal Court (BFH), the Federal Labour Court (BAG), and the Federal Social Court (BSG).

Within her parliamentary group, Wegge belongs to the Parliamentary Left, a left-wing movement.

Together with Marco Wanderwitz, Till Steffen, and Martina Renner, Wegge was one of the initiators of a 2024 cross-party initiative to request that the Federal Constitutional Court issue a ban on the far-right Alternative for Germany party.

== Other activities ==
- Foundation for Data Protection, Member of the advisory board (since 2022)
- German United Services Trade Union (ver.di), Member

== Personal life ==
Wegge is married and has a child.
