= Regina Kopp-Herr =

German politician (born 1957)

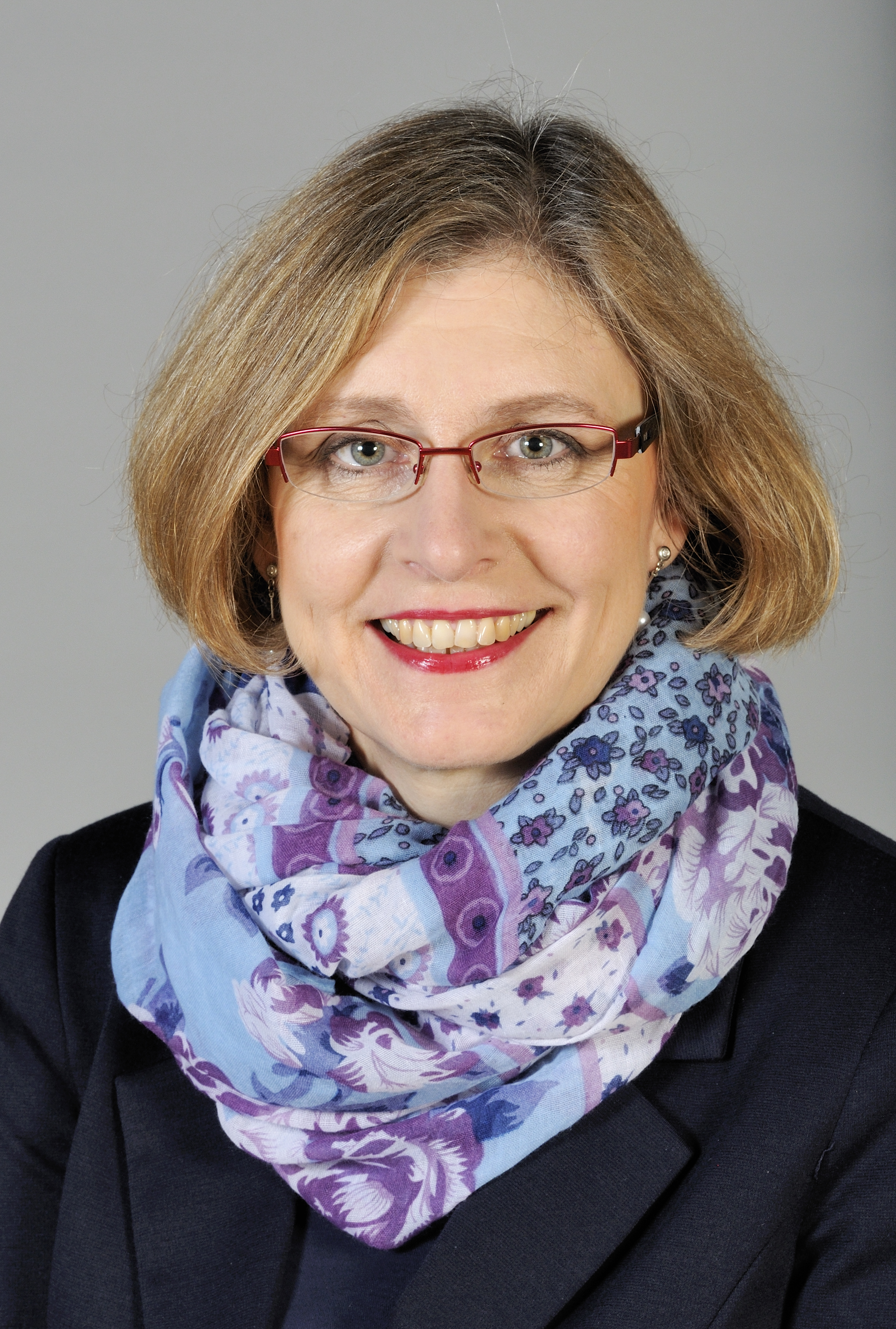
- Regina Kopp-Herr in 2013

Member of the Landtag of North Rhine-Westphalia
- In office 2010–2022

Personal details
- Born: Regina Kopp; 17 August 1957 (age 68) Oberhausen, Germany
- Party: Social Democratic Party of Germany

Regina Kopp-Herr (née Kopp; 17 August 1957 in Oberhausen) is a German politician from the Social Democratic Party. She was a member of the Landtag of North Rhine-Westphalia from 2010 to 2022. Since November 2009, she has been the mayor of the Bielefeld-Brackwede district.

== Biography ==
=== Early life and career ===
After graduating from secondary school in 1973, Regina Kopp-Herr initially trained as a medical assistant from 1973 to 1975. In 1975, she began further training as a medical laboratory technician, specializing in laboratory work, which she completed in 1977. Until the birth of her first child, she worked as a medical laboratory technician. Since 1998, she has worked as an educational specialist (after-school care, open all-day elementary school) and most recently as a project manager for the Falken youth organization in Bielefeld. Upon taking office as a member of the state parliament, she suspended her professional practice.

=== Political engagement ===
Regina Kopp-Herr has been a member of the SPD (Social Democratic Party of Germany) since 1992, a member of the Brackwede district council since 2004, and until 2009 she served as a citizen expert on the Bielefeld City Council's Youth Welfare Committee. In November 2009, she was elected by the Bielefeld-Brackwede district council as the first female district mayor. From October 2009 to December 2010, she was a member of the Bielefeld City Council, serving on the Environment and Climate Protection Committee, the Youth Welfare Committee, the Migration Council (as deputy advisory board member), and the Partnership Commission (as an advisory member). From 1994 to 2009, she was a member of the parent-teacher association and served on school conferences at numerous schools in Bielefeld, including those attended by her children. Furthermore, she has been chairwoman of the Brackwede Comprehensive School's support association since 2001, a member of the prison advisory board of Bielefeld-Brackwede I Correctional Facility since 2006, and a member of the supervisory board of the non-profit housing cooperative Bielefeld-Brackwede since 2009 (the first and only woman to hold this position in its 85-year history). From 2008 to 2012, she was an assessor and from 2012 to 2014 deputy chairwoman of the state executive committee of the Working Group of Social Democratic Women (AsF), and from 2011 to 2014 a member of the executive committee of the AsF Bielefeld subdistrict. Since March 2014, she has been deputy chairwoman of the executive committee of the SPD Bielefeld subdistrict. Her political priorities are children, youth, education, women, and family. Since 2014, Kopp-Herr has been an advisor to pro familia in the Bielefeld local branch. She is involved in social housing campaigning.

=== Elected office ===
In the 2010 North Rhine-Westphalia state election, Kopp-Herr was directly elected to the state parliament for the first time in constituency 93 – Bielefeld II. She thus won back the direct mandate in the constituency from long-serving member of parliament Rainer Lux (CDU) for the SPD and retained it in the snap elections of 2012. In the state parliament, she was a member of the Committee on Family, Children and Youth and the Committee on Women, Equality and Emancipation, where she served as her parliamentary group's spokesperson from 2016. Until early 2017, she was a member of the inquiry commission "Future of Family Policy in North Rhine-Westphalia". In the state elections of May 2017, she successfully defended her direct mandate in the constituency. She served as deputy chair of the SPD parliamentary group during the 17th legislative period. She left the state parliament after the 2022 state elections.

=== Personal life ===
Regina Kopp-Herr is married and has four children.

== See also ==
- List of members of the Landtag of North Rhine-Westphalia 2017–2022
