= Wolfgang Jörg =

German politician

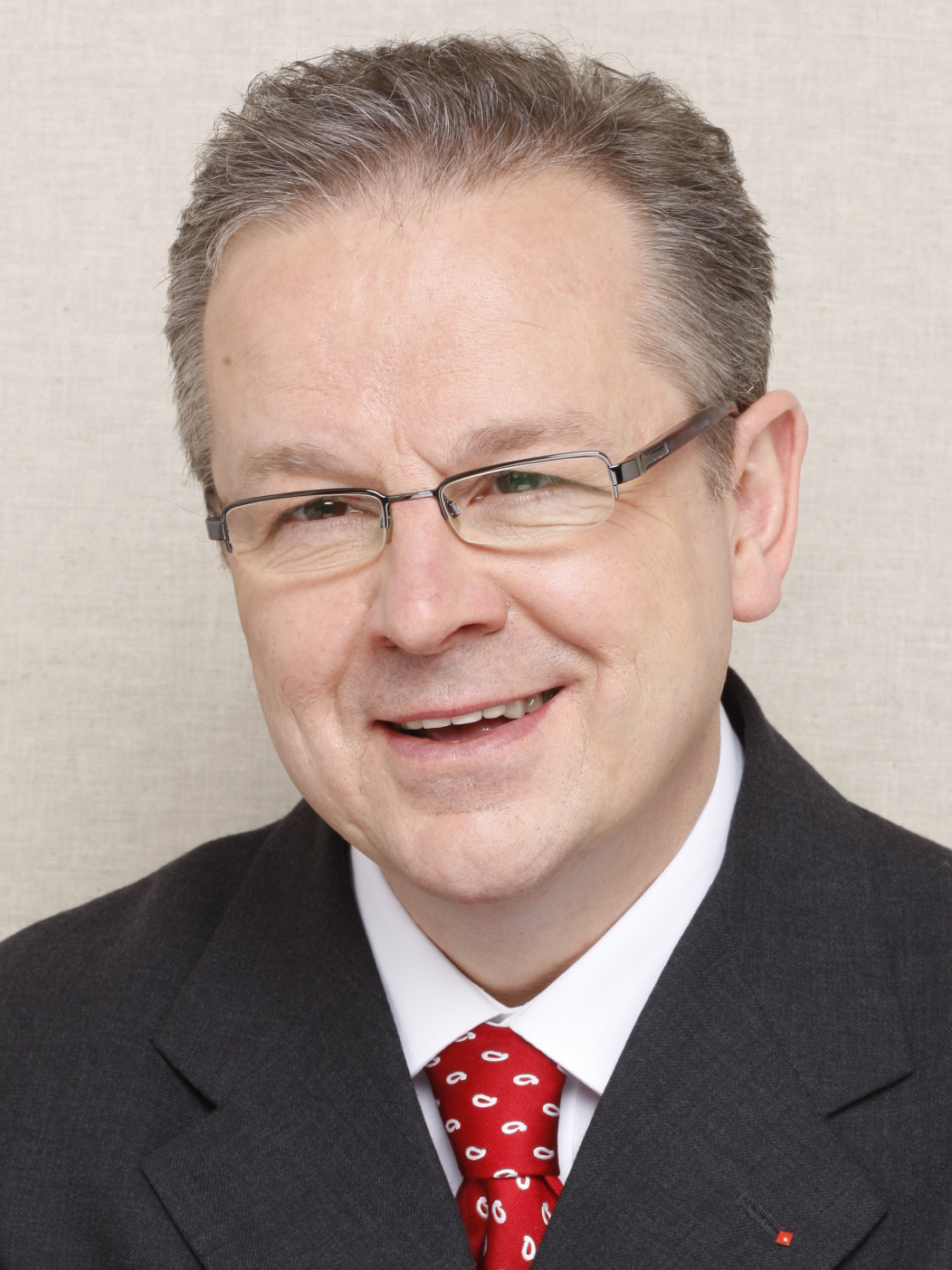
Wolfgang Jörg.

Wolfgang Jörg (born 1963) is a German politician, representative of the Social Democratic Party. He is a member of parliament in the federal state of North Rhine-Westphalia.

== See also ==
- List of Social Democratic Party of Germany politicians
- List of members of the Landtag of North Rhine-Westphalia 2017-2022
