= Daniel Scheen-Pauls =

German politician (born 1992)

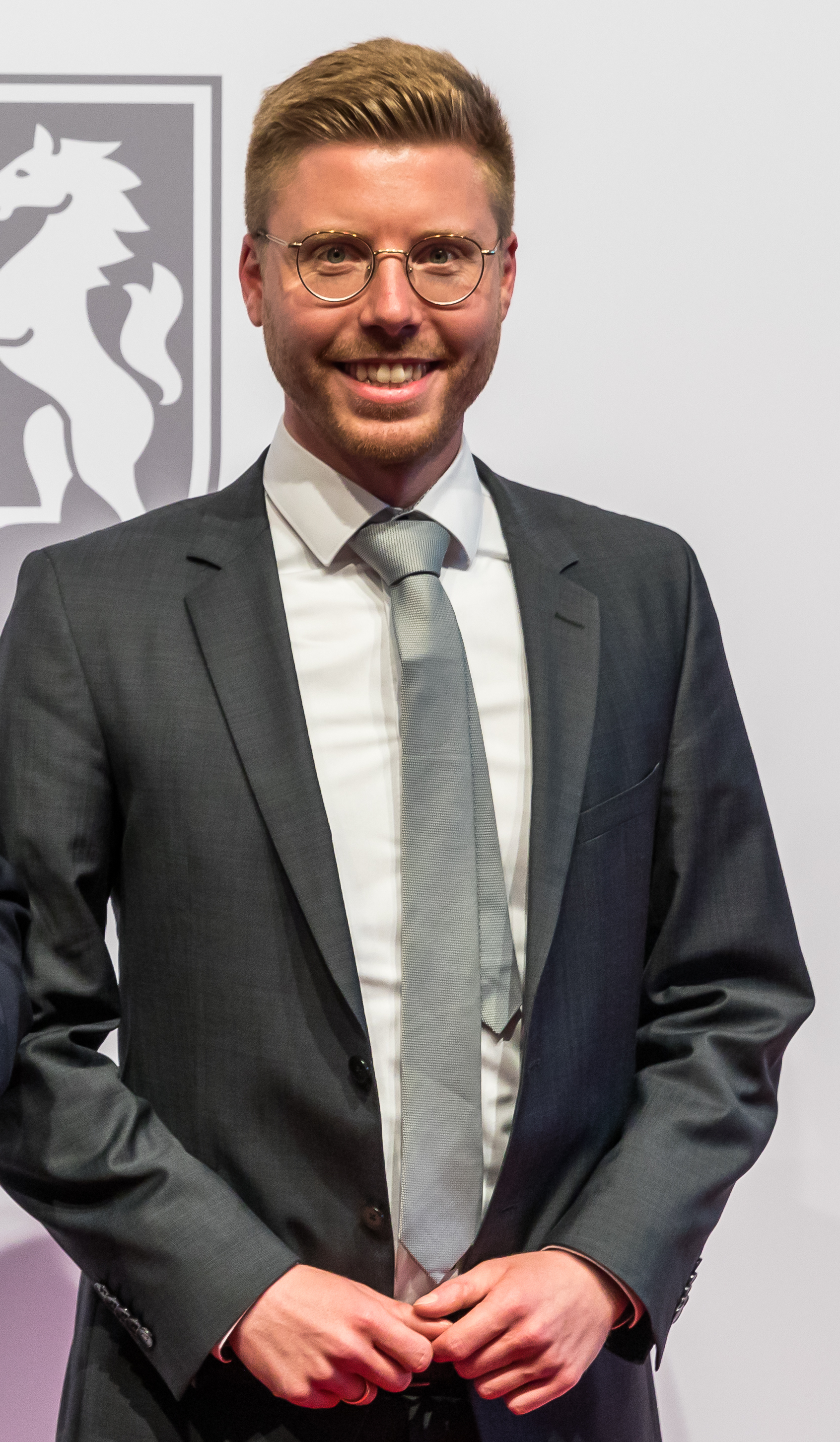
- Scheen-Pauls in 2023

Member of the Landtag of North Rhine-Westphalia
- Incumbent
- Assumed office 1 June 2022
- Preceded by: Stefan Kämmerling
- Constituency: Aachen IV

Personal details
- Born: 15 July 1992 (age 33)
- Party: Christian Democratic Union (since 2019)

Daniel Scheen-Pauls (born 15 July 1992) is a German politician serving as a member of the Landtag of North Rhine-Westphalia since 2022. He has served as mayor of Strauch since 2020.
