= Günter Rixe =

German politician (1939–2024)

Member of the Bundestag for Bielefeld – Gütersloh II
- In office 18 February 1987 – 26 October 1998

Personal details
- Born: 15 June 1939 Bielefeld, Gau Westphalia-North, Germany
- Died: 9 November 2024 (aged 85) Werther, North Rhine-Westphalia, Germany
- Party: SPD
- Occupation: Craftsman

Günter Rixe (15 June 1939 – 9 November 2024) was a German politician. A member of the Social Democratic Party, he served in the Bundestag from 1987 to 1998.

Rixe died in Werther on 9 November 2024, at the age of 85.
