= Jörg Blöming =

German politician (born 1972)

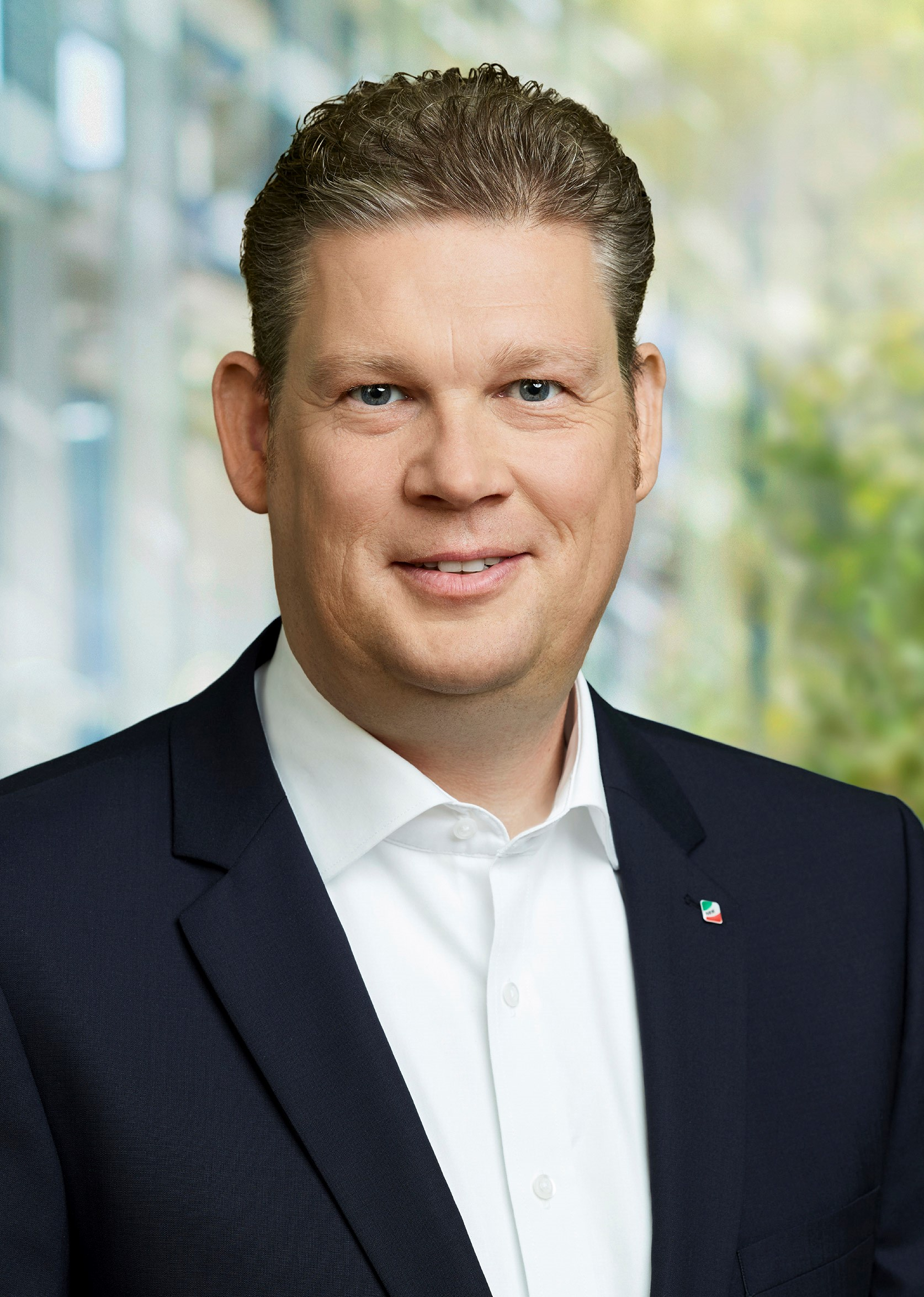
- Blöming in 2019

Member of the Landtag of North Rhine-Westphalia
- Incumbent
- Assumed office 1 June 2017
- Preceded by: Marlies Stotz
- Constituency: Soest II

Personal details
- Born: 1 January 1972 (age 54)
- Party: Christian Democratic Union (since 1989)

Jörg Blöming (born 1 January 1972) is a German politician serving as a member of the Landtag of North Rhine-Westphalia since 2017. He has served as deputy chairman of the Christian Democratic Union in South Westphalia since 2017.
