= Reinhard Meyer zu Bentrup =

German politician (1939–2024)

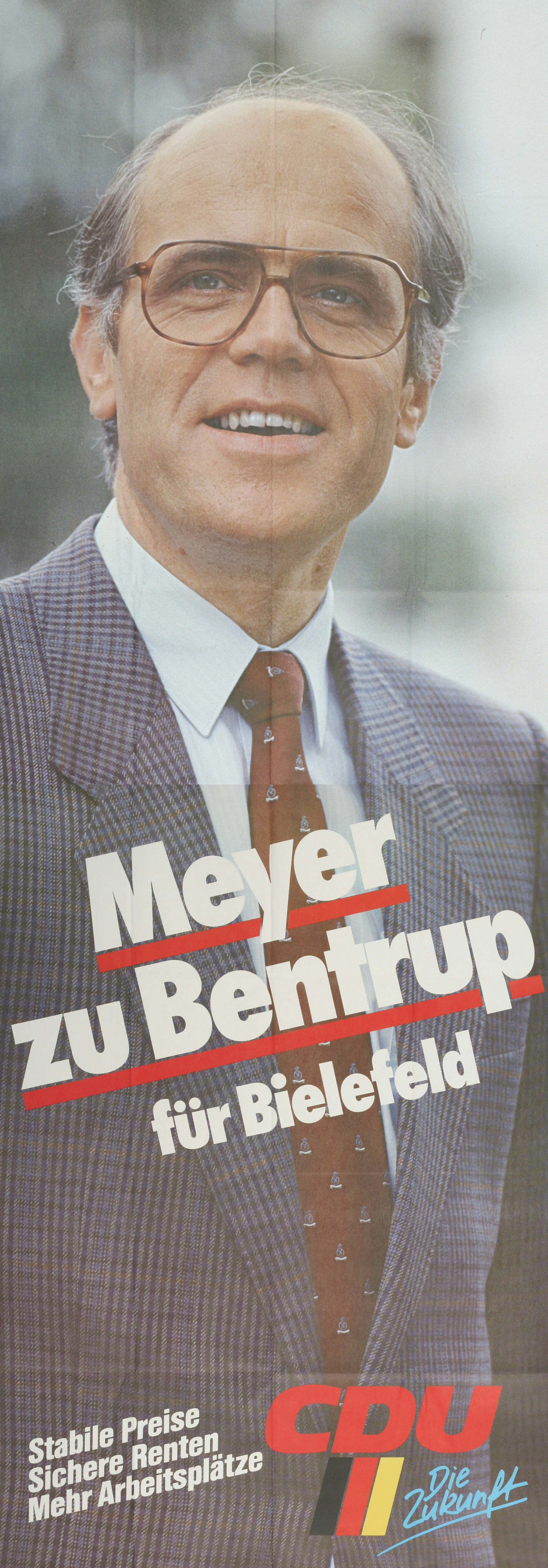
Meyer zu Bentrup in 1987

Reinhard Meyer zu Bentrup (22 May 1939 – 13 August 2024) was a German politician of the Christian Democratic Union (CDU). He was born in Gadderbaum, Bielefeld.

== Life ==
Meyer zu Bentrup was a farmer. He had a farm in Brönninghausen-Bielefeld. He studied agriculture at universities in Berlin and Bonn. He was a member of the CDU. From 1976 to 1994, Meyer zu Bentrup was a member of the German Bundestag. He was married.

== Awards ==
- 1988: Order of Merit of the Federal Republic of Germany
