= Sebastian Białas =

Polish footballer

Personal information
- Date of birth: 7 January 1990 (age 36)
- Place of birth: Bielsko-Biała, Poland
- Height: 1.84 m (6 ft 1/2 in)
- Position: Defender

Youth career
- –2005: Czarni-Góral Żywiec
- 2005–2008: Arka Gdynia
- 2008–2011: Reggina

Senior career*
Years	Team	Apps	(Gls)
2009–2010	→ Arka Gdynia (loan)	0	(0)
2010–2011	→ Zagłębie Sosnowiec (loan)	5	(0)
2013–2015	Czarni-Góral Żywiec		

International career
2007	Poland U18	12	(0)
2008	Poland U19	5	(0)
- * Club domestic league appearances and goals

Sebastian Białas (born 7 January 1990) is a Polish former professional footballer who played as a defender.

== International career ==
Białas made his debut for the Poland under-18 national team in August 2007. He later represented the Poland U19s.
