= Anke Fuchs-Dreisbach =

German politician (born 1977)

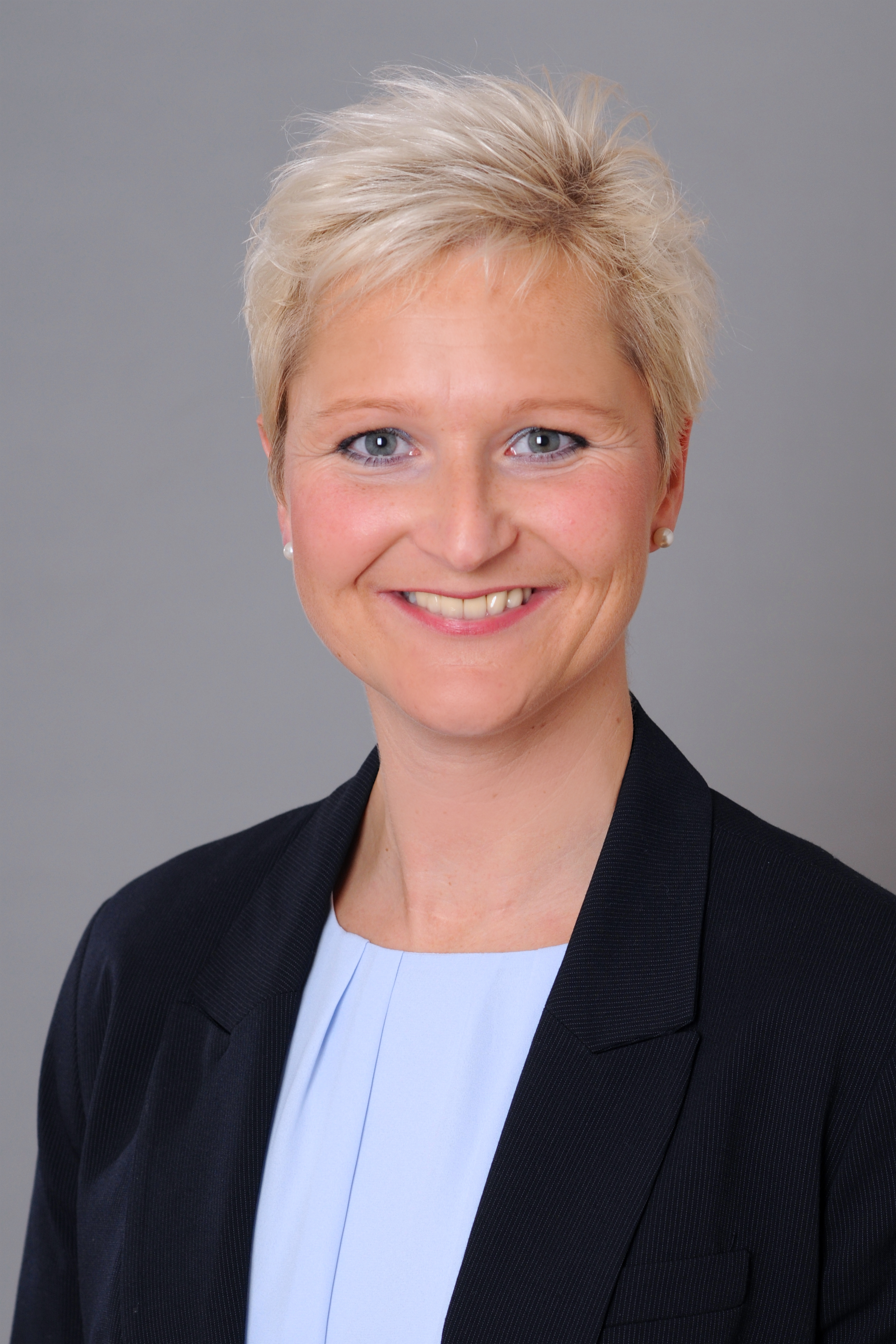
- Fuchs-Dreisbach in 2016

Member of the Landtag of North Rhine-Westphalia
- Incumbent
- Assumed office 1 June 2017
- Preceded by: Falk Heinrichs
- Constituency: Siegen-Wittgenstein II

Personal details
- Born: 13 April 1977 (age 49)
- Party: Christian Democratic Union (since 2010)

Anke Fuchs-Dreisbach (born 13 April 1977) is a German politician serving as a member of the Landtag of North Rhine-Westphalia since 2017. She has served as mayor of Sassenhausen since 2009.
