= Friedrich Straetmanns =

German politician (born 1961)

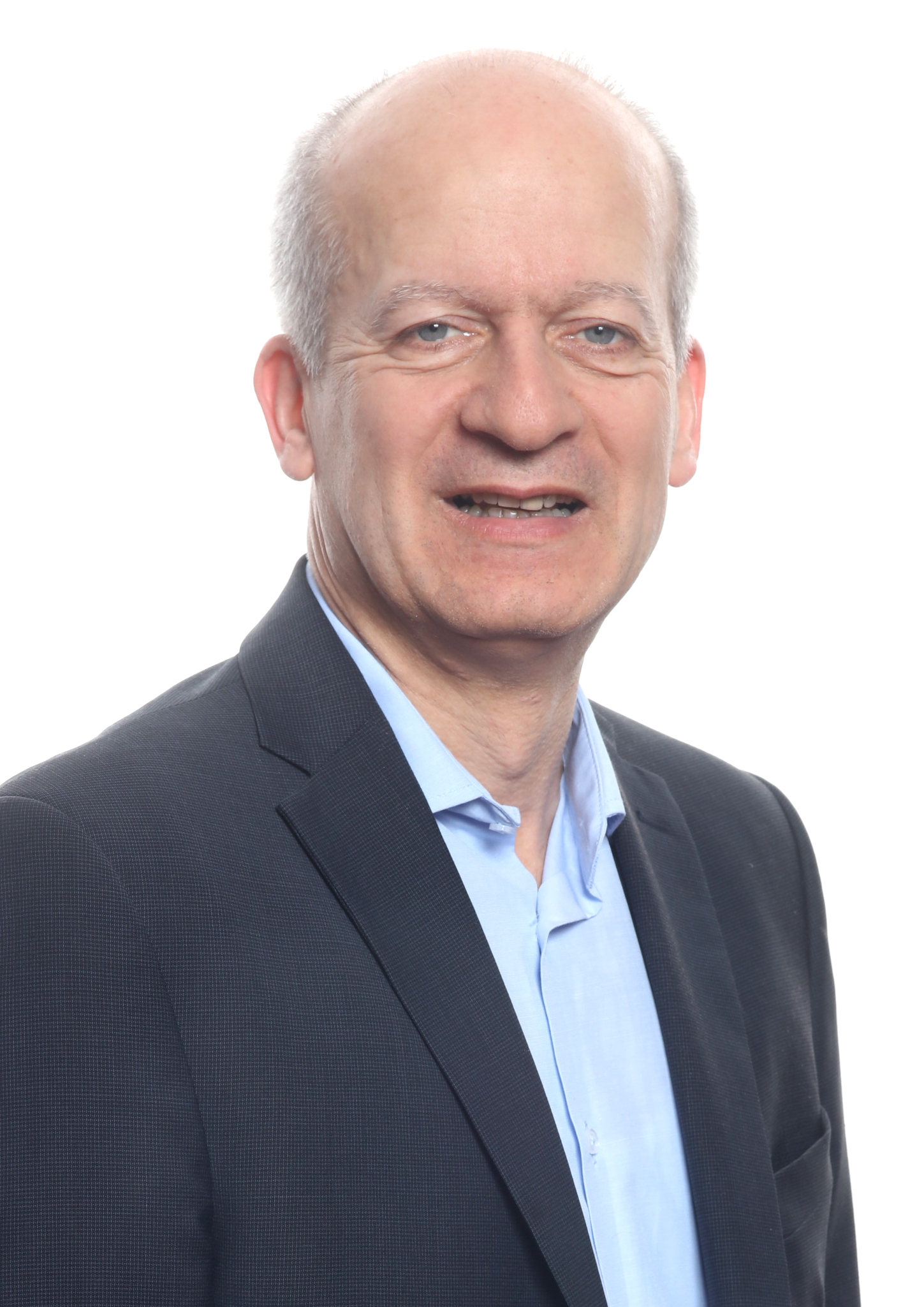
- Official portrait, 2017

Member of the Bundestag
- In office 24 September 2017 – 26 September 2021
- Constituency: Left Party's list

Secretary of State for Justice, Equality and Consumer Protection of Mecklenburg-Western Pomerania
- In office 15 November 2021 – 21 December 2024
- President: Manuela Schwesig
- Minister: Jacqueline Bernhardt

Personal details
- Born: 5 August 1961 (age 64) Bielefeld, West Germany (now Germany)
- Party: BSW (2024–present)
- Other political affiliations: SPD (1985–2005); WASG (2005–2007); The Left (2007–2024)
- Occupation: Lawyer • Judge • Politician

Friedrich Straetmanns (born 5 August 1961) is a German politician. Born in Bielefeld, North Rhine-Westphalia, he has represented The Left. Friedrich Straetmanns served as a member of the Bundestag from the state of North Rhine-Westphalia from 2017 to 2021.

== Life ==
After completing his military service, Friedrich Straetmanns studied law and political science from 1982 to 1989, including a traineeship. Afterwards he worked as a lawyer for a short time and then at the Diakonisches Werk until 1992. He then became a judge at the Social Court of Detmold. He became member of the bundestag after the 2017 German federal election. He is a member of the Committee for Legal Affairs and Consumer Protection and the Committee for the Examination of Elections.
