= Ibrahim Yetim =

German politician (born 1965)

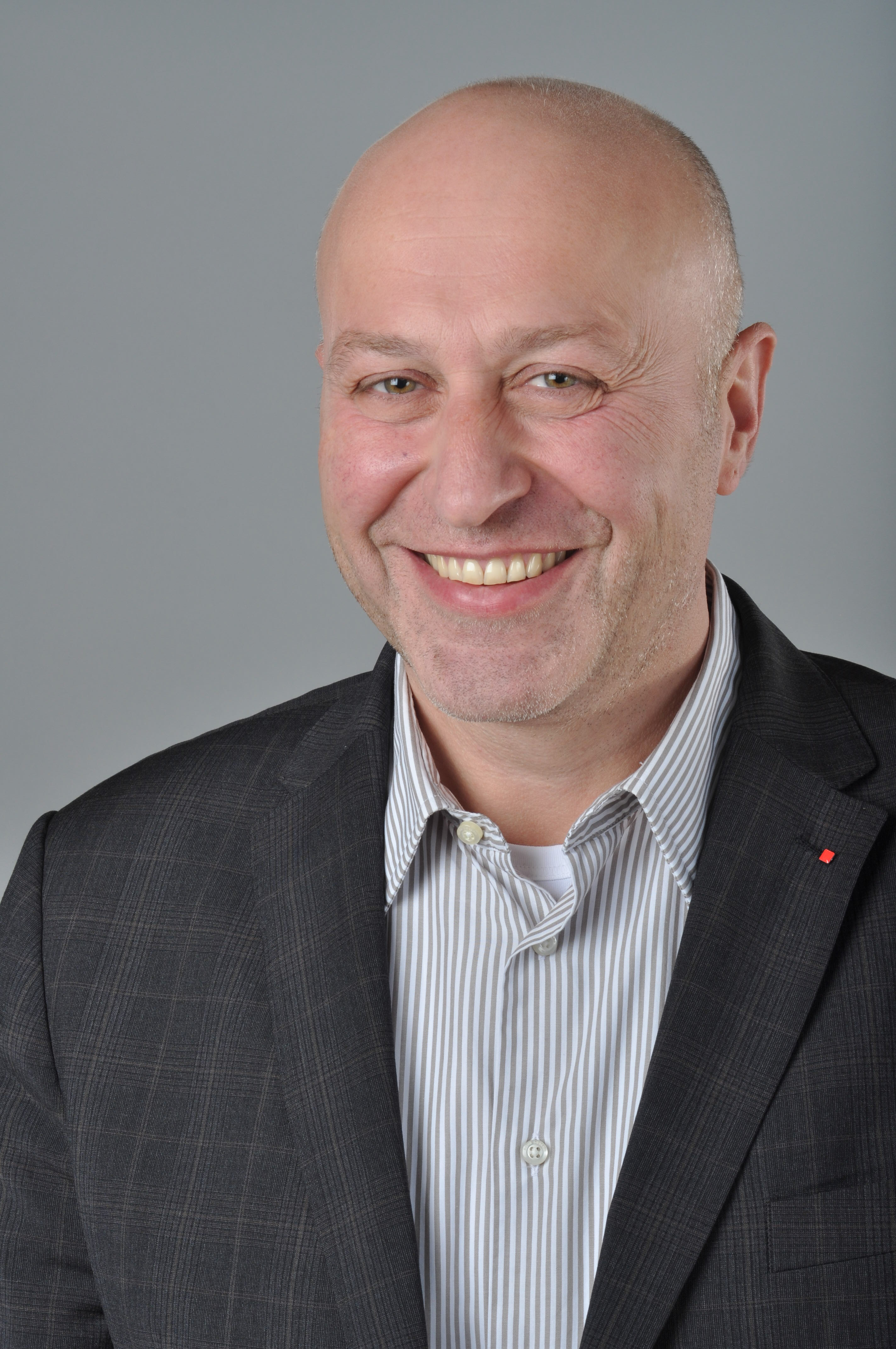
- Yetim in 2013

Member of the Landtag of North Rhine-Westphalia
- In office 9 June 2010 – 3 March 2023
- Preceded by: Elke Talhorst
- Succeeded by: Stefan Kämmerling
- Constituency: Wesel IV

Personal details
- Born: 14 March 1965 (age 61) Dinslaken
- Party: Social Democratic Party (since 1991)

Ibrahim Yetim (born 14 March 1965 in Dinslaken) is a German politician. From 2010 to 2023, he was a member of the Landtag of North Rhine-Westphalia. He has served as chairman of the Social Democratic Party in Moers since 2008.
