= Hubertus Kramer =

German politician (1959–2022)

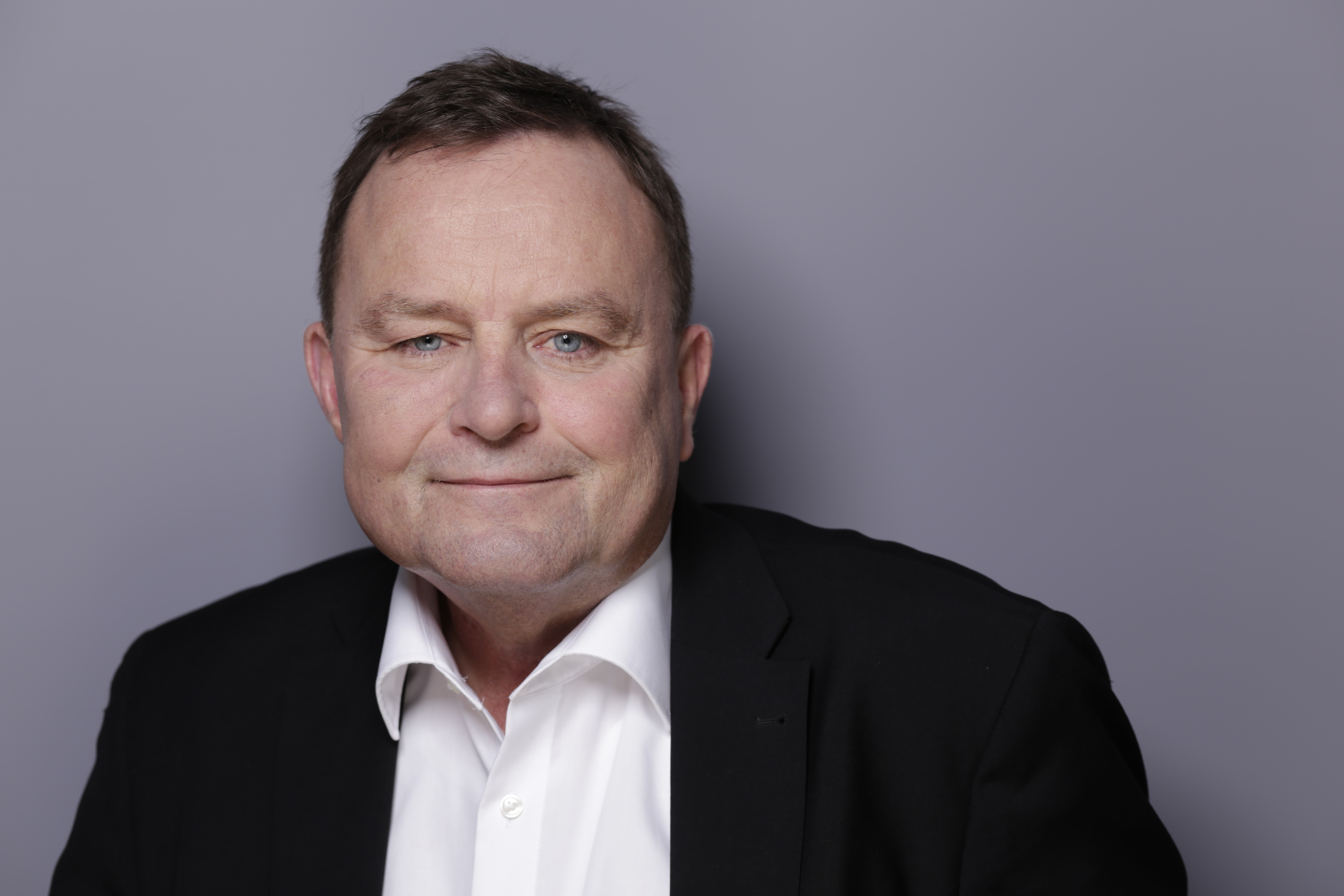
- Kramer in 2016

Member of the Landtag of North Rhine-Westphalia
- In office 8 June 2005 – 24 January 2022

Personal details
- Born: 3 November 1959 Finnentrop, North Rhine-Westphalia, West Germany
- Died: 24 January 2022 (aged 62)
- Party: SPD

Hubertus Kramer (3 November 1959 – 24 January 2022) was a German politician. He had served in the Landtag of North Rhine-Westphalia since 2005. He died on 24 January 2022, at the age of 62.
