= Stefan Kämmerling =

German politician (born 1976)

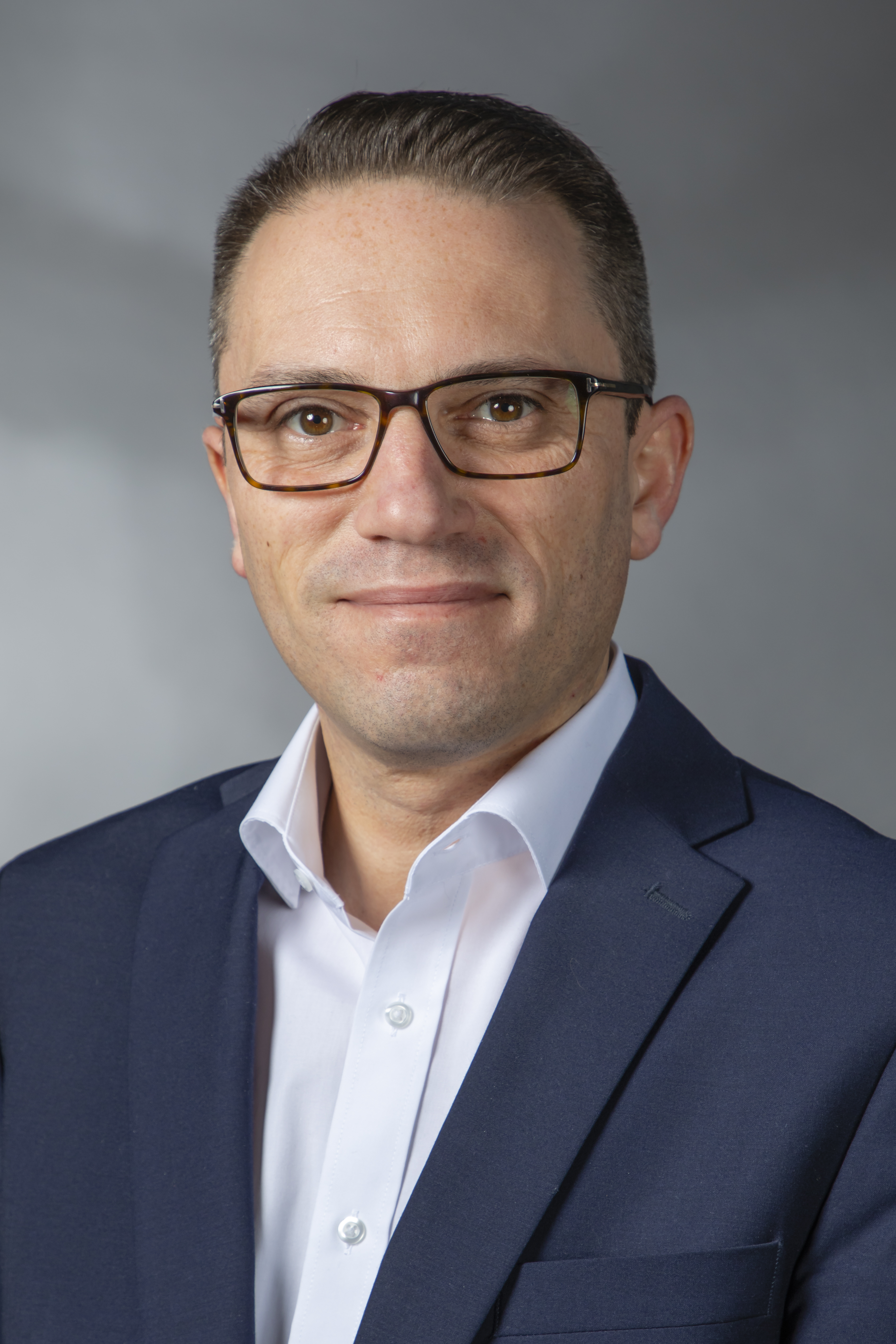
- Kämmerling in 2019

Member of the Landtag of North Rhine-Westphalia
- Incumbent
- Assumed office 4 March 2023
- Preceded by: Ibrahim Yetim
- In office 31 May 2012 – 1 June 2022
- Preceded by: Axel Wirtz
- Succeeded by: Daniel Scheen-Pauls
- Constituency: Aachen IV

Personal details
- Born: 25 March 1976 (age 50)
- Party: Social Democratic Party (since 1998)

Stefan Kämmerling (born 25 March 1976) is a German politician. He has been a member of the Landtag of North Rhine-Westphalia since 2023, having previously served from 2012 to 2022. He has served as managing director of the SPD North Rhine-Westphalia since 2022.
