= Maximilian Kneller =

German politician (born 1993)

Member of the Bundestag
- Incumbent
- Assumed office TBD
- Constituency: North Rhine-Westphalia

Personal details
- Born: 1993 (age 32–33)
- Party: Alternative for Germany

Maximilian Kneller (20 October 1993 in Bielefeld) is a German politician who was elected as a member of the Bundestag in 2025. He is the deputy leader of the Alternative for Germany in Bielefeld.
