= Elfriede Eilers =

German politician (1921–2016)

Elfriede Eilers (17 January 1921 – 4 June 2016) was a German politician of the Social Democratic Party of Germany (SPD).

== Life and profession ==
Eilers was born in Bielefeld and was of Protestant faith. She initially completed a commercial apprenticeship after attending Realschule. She then worked as an accountant at Stadtwerke Bielefeld from 1941. From 1950 to 1952, Eilers trained as a welfare nurse at the Seminar for Social Professions in Mannheim, the welfare school of the Workers' Welfare Association. She then worked as a welfare officer for the Workers' Welfare Association in the Lippe sub-district. From 1954, Eilers was a youth welfare officer for the city of Bielefeld. From 1972 to 1990, she was deputy national chairwoman of the Workers' Welfare Association, of which she had been a member since 1950.

In December 2004, Eilers founded the Elfriede-Eilers-Stiftung, based in Bielefeld. The purpose of this foundation is to promote new projects in the areas of child, youth, elderly and disabled care. At her funeral service at Bielefeld's Sennefriedhof on June 13, 2016, she paid tribute to the former SPD. June 2016, she was honored by the former SPD chairman Franz Müntefering, the chairman of the board of the Workers' Welfare Association, Wolfgang Stadler, and the mayor of Bielefeld, Pit Clausen.

The estate of Elfriede Eilers is kept in the Stadtarchiv Bielefeld. In addition to personal documents and private correspondence, it includes material on Eilers' involvement with the Workers' Welfare Association. Further documents relating primarily to her political activities can be found in the Archive of Social Democracy of the Friedrich Ebert Foundation in Bonn.

== Party ==
Her parents were already active in the SPD in the Weimar Republic. After the Second World War, she initially became involved in the youth work of the Falcons and also joined the SPD in 1945. From 1966 to 1977, she was a member of the SPD's Federal Executive Committee, and from 1973 also of its Presidium. Also from 1973 to 1977, she was Federal Chairwoman of the Working Group of Social Democratic Women (ASF). From 1979 to 1993 she was a member of the SPD Control Commission and from 1978 to 1991 she was the SPD party executive's federal representative for work with senior citizens. In November 2005, Elfriede Eilers was appointed honorary chairwoman of the SPD district Ostwestfalen-Lippe.

== Member of Parliament ==
Eilers was a member of the German Bundestag from 1957 to 1980. She was elected in the 1957, 1961, 1965 and 1969 via the state list of the SPD in North Rhine-Westphalia. In the 1972 and 1976, she won the direct mandate in the constituency of Bielefeld-Stadt. In 1969, she was elected to the parliamentary group executive and from 15 December 1977 until her retirement, she was a member of the parliamentary group. December 1977 until she left parliament, she was Parliamentary Secretary of the SPD parliamentary group.

From 1979 to 1984, Elfriede Eilers was a member of Bielefeld City Council.

== Honors ==
- 1973: Cross of Merit 1st. Class of the Federal Republic of Germany
- 1977: Grand Cross of Merit of the Federal Republic of Germany
- 1983: Grand Cross of Merit with Star of the Federal Republic of Germany
- Ring of Honor of the City of Bielefeld

== Literature ==
- Heinz Thörmer (1996), "When women are active, they are usually active longer than men!": Elfriede Eilers - Lebensbilder, Marburg: Schüren, ISBN 3-89472-136-7
