= Andreas Bialas =

German politician (born 1968)

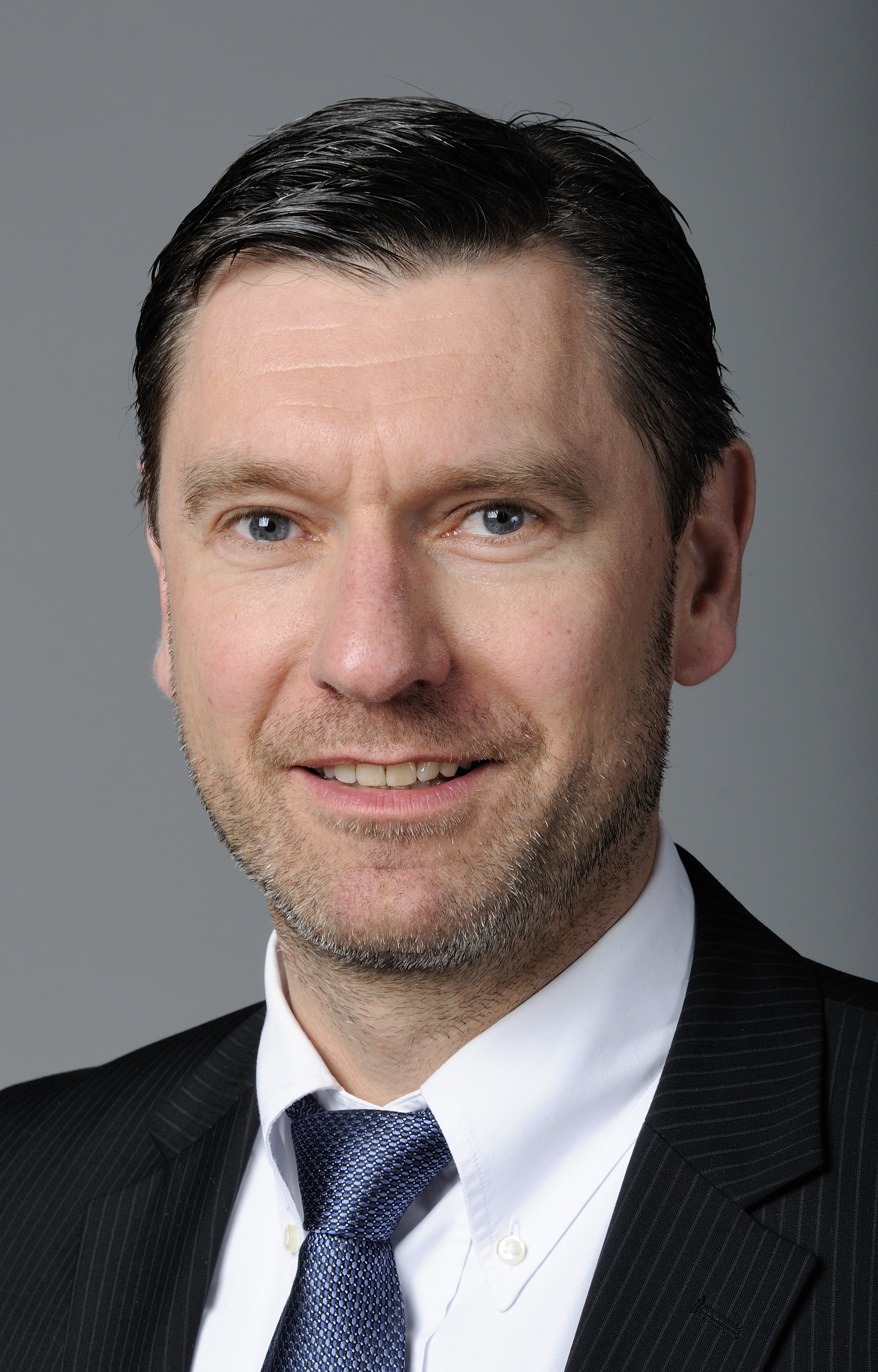
- Bialas in 2013

Member of the Landtag of North Rhine-Westphalia
- Incumbent
- Assumed office 9 June 2010
- Preceded by: Peter Brakelmann
- Constituency: Wuppertal II (2010–2022); Wuppertal I (2022–present)

Personal details
- Born: 28 May 1968 (age 58)
- Party: Social Democratic Party (since 1994)

Andreas Bialas (born 28 May 1968) is a German politician serving as a member of the Landtag of North Rhine-Westphalia since 2010. He has served as mayor of Langerfeld-Beyenburg since 2020.
