= Josef Hovenjürgen =

German politician (born 1963)

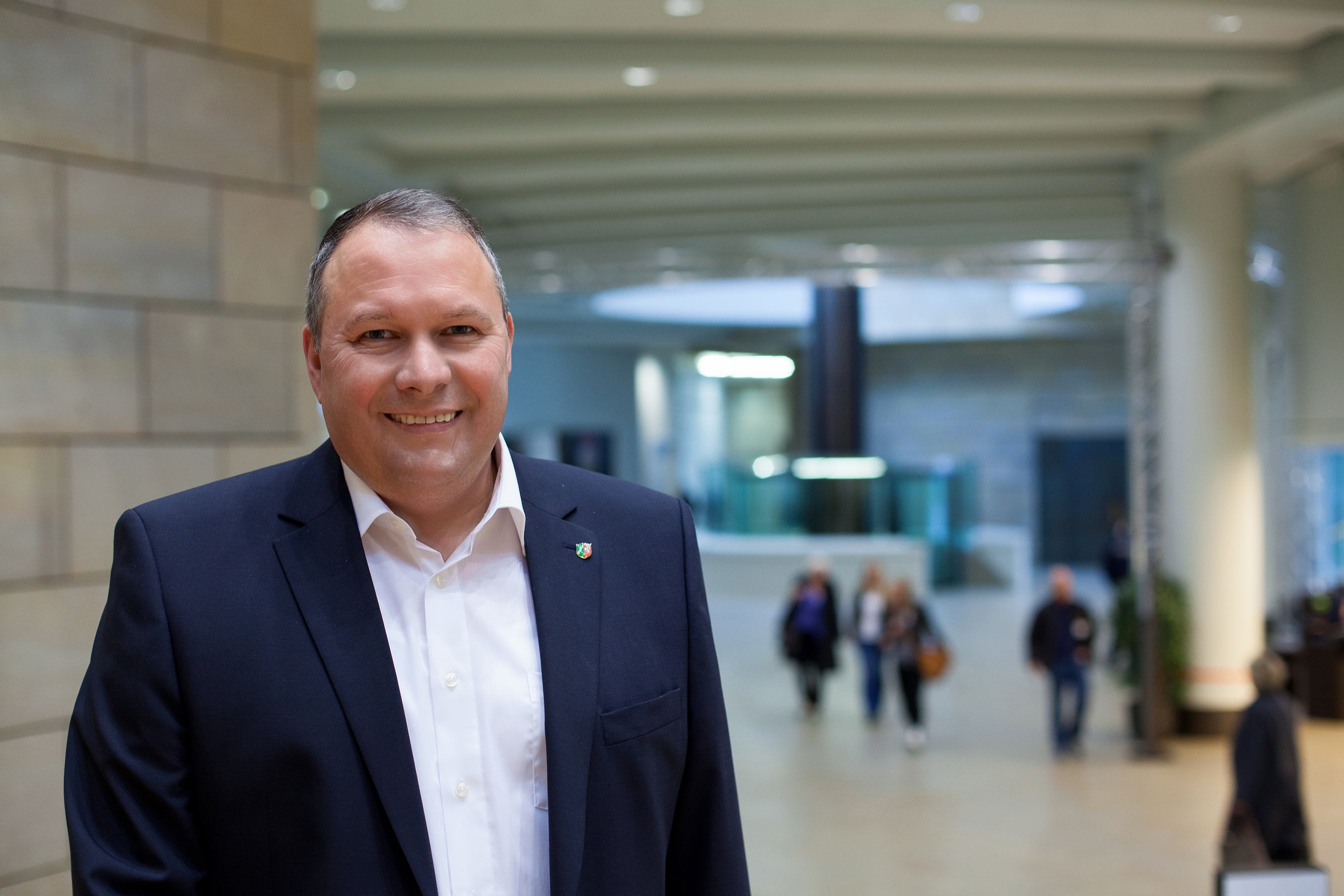
- Hovenjürgen in 2014

Member of the Landtag of North Rhine-Westphalia
- Incumbent
- Assumed office 1 November 2002
- Preceded by: Laurenz Meyer
- Constituency: Recklinghausen IV (2005–2012, 2017–2022); Recklinghausen III (2022–present)
- In office 5 August 1999 – 1 June 2000
- Preceded by: Karin Hussing

Personal details
- Born: 10 January 1963 (age 63)
- Party: Christian Democratic Union (since 1983)

Josef Hovenjürgen (born 10 January 1963) is a German politician. He has been a member of the Landtag of North Rhine-Westphalia since 2002, having previously served from 1999 to 2000. He has served as parliamentary state secretary for home affairs, municipal affairs, construction and digitalization since 2022.
