= SPD Women =

Women's wing of the SPD party

- SPD FRAUEN – Arbeitsgemeinschaft Sozialdemokratischer Frauen
- Formation: June 24, 1972
- Legal status: working group appointed by the SPD party executive
- Website: frauen.spd.de

SPD Women (German: SPD FRAUEN – Arbeitsgemeinschaft Sozialdemokratischer Frauen) is the women's wing of the Social Democratic Party of Germany (SPD). Its chairpersons are Carmen Wegge and Ulrike Häfner.

The working group has set itself the goal of achieving equality between women and men in the party and in society. It ensures that women's interests and demands are represented in the party's political decision-making process and familiarizes women with the party's policies and objectives. Its aim is to develop and implement joint demands in dialogue with trade unions, associations, organizations, and the German and international women's movement.

The association is a member of the German Women's Council, PES Women (Women's Organisation of the Party of European Socialists (PES)) and the "Socialist Women's International".

Until October 2023, the organization was called the Working Group of Social Democratic Women (ASF).

== History ==
On June 24, 1972, the SPD party executive committee decided to establish a working group for women within the SPD. The first national conference of the Working Group of Social Democratic Women (AsF) took place in Ludwigshafen from March 23 to 25, 1973. Elfriede Eilers was elected as its first national chairwoman. She was succeeded in 1977 by Elfriede Hoffmann, who held the office until 1981.

Elfriede Hoffmann was succeeded by Inge Wettig-Danielmeier, who remained Federal Chairwoman of the AsF until 1992. During her tenure, the SPD introduced a 40 percent gender quota. The quota was initially highly controversial within the SPD and also within the ASF. However, Wettig-Danielmeier was among those who successfully implemented the quota within the SPD. The ASF also succeeded in enshrining the sentence "Whoever wants a humane society must overcome the patriarchal one" in the SPD's 1989 Berliner Programm. This sentence is also found in the SPD's 2007 "Hamburg Program".

Following the fall of the Berlin Wall, a working group of Social Democratic Women was formed within the Social Democratic Party of the GDR, chaired by Eva Kunz. With the merger of the parties on September 26, 1990, the working groups also merged.

Karin Junker succeeded Inge Wettig-Danielmeier, holding the office from 1992 to 2004. She was followed by Elke Ferner, and in 2018 Maria Noichl was elected federal chair. Since 2021, the ASF/SPD Women's organization has been led for the first time by a dual leadership consisting of Maria Noichl and Ulrike Häfner. Since 2025, the dual leadership has consisted of Ulrike Häfner and Carmen Wegge.

== Organisation ==
=== Legal status ===
As a working group within the SPD, SPD Women is not a legally independent organization, but rather part of the SPD. The rights and fundamental organization of SPD Women are regulated in the "Principles and Guidelines for the Activities of Working Groups in the SPD" (adopted by the party executive committee on March 26, 2012).

SPD Women's branches can only be established with the approval of the respective party executive committee. While SPD Women generally operates autonomously, the executive committee of each SPD branch has the right to intervene; for example, it can prohibit certain events, convene members' or delegates' meetings, submit motions at these meetings, and also request the removal of the executive committee by the members'/delegates' meeting.

=== Membership ===
SPD Women comprise all female SPD members – that's around 134,000 women, or 33 percent of SPD members (SPD Equality Report 2021). There is no separate membership solely in the ASF. However, it is possible to be active in the ASF as a guest member. Guest members do not have voting rights. Interested individuals can obtain supporter status under Section 10a, Paragraph 3 of the SPD's Organizational Statutes without becoming SPD members. Supporters receive full membership rights in a working group and/or thematic forum at the federal level. Here, they have active and passive voting rights, as well as the right to submit motions, speak, and nominate personnel. This is based on the "Guidelines of the SPD Executive Committee on Supporters" (adopted by the executive committee on March 26, 2012).

=== Structure ===
The structure follows the SPD's organizational structure. Accordingly, below the federal level there are state associations, districts (these levels coincide everywhere except in Hesse and Lower Saxony), sub-districts, and working groups. In some districts, there are also county associations and regional districts, provided these also exist within the SPD.

=== Federal level ===
The highest body at the federal level is the Federal Conference, which takes place every two years. It comprises the Federal Executive Committee and 250 delegates elected by the district associations; the allocation of delegate seats to the districts is based on the number of female SPD members, with each district having one basic mandate. The Federal Conference decides on motions and the work program of the SPD Women's organization, elects the Federal Executive Committee, and receives its report. Extraordinary Federal Conferences can be held outside the regular biennial cycle.

The Federal Committee represents the district associations between federal conferences. It consists of 30 delegates elected by the districts and the Federal Executive Board.

The SPD Women's Federal Executive Committee consists of two chairpersons, three deputy chairpersons, and 12 other members. The current federal chairpersons are Carmen Wegge and Ulrike Häfner.

=== Goals ===
The goals of the SPD Women are:

- actual equality in society
- securing employment and independent old-age security for women
- equality for women and the reduction of discrimination in professional life
- Expanding the range of career choices for girls and women to include science and technology
- Work-life balance for mothers and fathers
- Combating violence against women
- Implementation of women's rights worldwide
- equality within the SPD through the consistent application of the quota system

== Literature ==
- Susanne Eyssen: Der Aufbruch der Frauen in der SPD. Die Entwicklung der Frauenarbeitsgemeinschaft (ASF) während der 1970er und 1980er Jahre, Budrich Uni Press, Opladen, Berlin, Toronto 2019. ISBN 978-3-86388-794-0
