= Christina Kampmann =

German politician (born 1980)

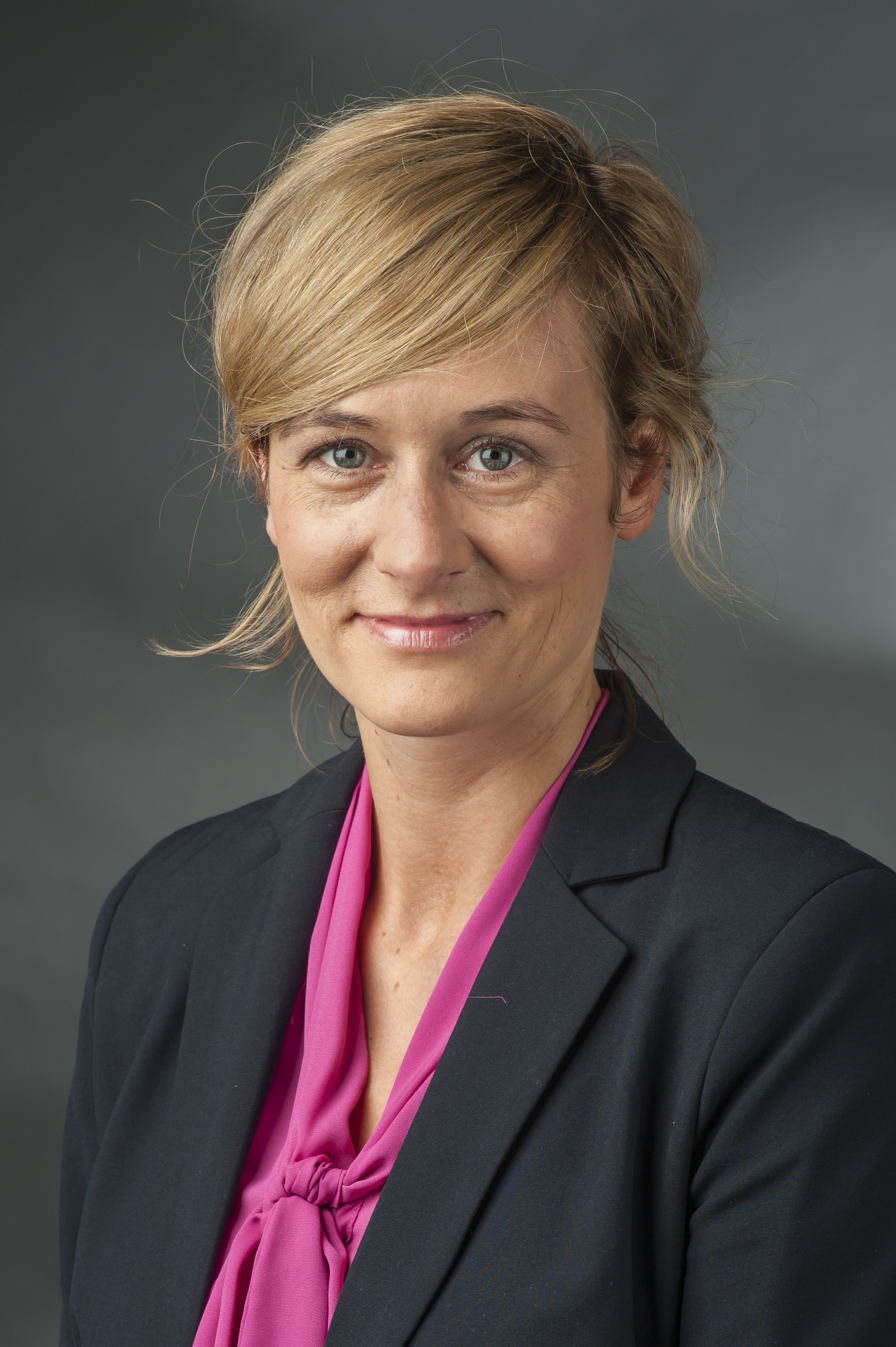
- Kampmann in 2014

Member of the Bundestag
- In office 22 October 2013 – 1 October 2015
- Preceded by: Lena Strothmann
- Succeeded by: Elfi Scho-Antwerpes
- Constituency: Bielefeld – Gütersloh II

Personal details
- Born: 11 July 1980 (age 45) Gütersloh
- Party: Social Democratic Party (since 2006)

Christina Kampmann (born 11 July 1980 in Gütersloh) is a German politician serving as a member of the Landtag of North Rhine-Westphalia since 2017. From 2015 to 2017, she served as minister of family, children, youth, culture and sport of North Rhine-Westphalia. From 2013 to 2015, she was a member of the Bundestag.
