= Cologne II =

Electoral constituency represented in the Bundestag

93 Cologne II
- Electoral district for the Bundestag
- Cologne II in 2025
- State: North Rhine-Westphalia
- Population: 330,800 (2019)
- Electorate: 242,483 (2021)
- Major settlements: Cologne (partial)
- Area: 101.5 km^{2}

Current electoral district
- Created: 1949
- Party: GRÜNE
- Member: Sven Lehmann
- Elected: 2021, 2025

Cologne II (German: Köln II) is an electoral constituency (German: Wahlkreis) represented in the Bundestag. It elects one member via first-past-the-post voting. Under the current constituency numbering system, it is designated as constituency 93. It is located in western North Rhine-Westphalia, comprising the southwestern part of the city of Cologne.

Cologne II was created for the inaugural 1949 federal election. Since 2021, it has been represented by Sven Lehmann of the Alliance 90/The Greens.

== Geography ==
Cologne II is located in western North Rhine-Westphalia. As of the 2021 federal election, it comprises the southwestern part of the independent city of Cologne, specifically the districts of Rodenkirchen, Lindenthal, and the Stadtteile of Altstadt-Süd and Neustadt-Süd from Innenstadt.

== History ==
Cologne II was created in 1949. In the 1949 election, it was North Rhine-Westphalia constituency 8 in the numbering system. From 1953 through 1961, it was number 67. From 1965 through 1998, it was number 60. From 2002 through 2009, it was number 95. In the 2013 through 2021 elections, it was number 94. From the 2025 election, it has been number 93.

Originally, the constituency comprised the area of Cologne on the left bank of the Rhine south of the line made by Aachener Straße and Innere Kanalstraße. In the 1965 through 1976 elections, it comprised Bayenthal, Zollstock, Klettenberg, Sülz, Lindenthal, Müngersdorf, and Ehrenfeld south of Subbelrather Straße. In the 1980 through 1998 elections, it comprised Rodenkirchen and Lindenthal. It acquired its current borders in the 2002 election.

Election	No.	Name	Borders
1949	8	Köln II	Cologne city (only the area on the left bank of the Rhine south of the line made by Aachener Straße and Innere Kanalstraße)
1953	67	Köln II	Cologne city (only the area on the left bank of the Rhine south of the line made by Aachener Straße and Innere Kanalstraße)
1957	67	Köln II	Cologne city (only the area on the left bank of the Rhine south of the line made by Aachener Straße and Innere Kanalstraße)
1961	67	Köln II	Cologne city (only the area on the left bank of the Rhine south of the line made by Aachener Straße and Innere Kanalstraße)
1965	60	Köln II	Cologne city (only Bayenthal, Zollstock, Klettenberg, Sülz, Lindenthal, Müngersdorf, and Ehrenfeld south of Subbelrather Straße)
1969	60	Köln II	Cologne city (only Bayenthal, Zollstock, Klettenberg, Sülz, Lindenthal, Müngersdorf, and Ehrenfeld south of Subbelrather Straße)
1972	60	Köln II	Cologne city (only Bayenthal, Zollstock, Klettenberg, Sülz, Lindenthal, Müngersdorf, and Ehrenfeld south of Subbelrather Straße)
1976	60	Köln II	Cologne city (only Bayenthal, Zollstock, Klettenberg, Sülz, Lindenthal, Müngersdorf, and Ehrenfeld south of Subbelrather Straße)
1980	60	Köln II	Cologne city (only Rodenkirchen and Lindenthal districts)
1983	60	Köln II	Cologne city (only Rodenkirchen and Lindenthal districts)
1987	60	Köln II	Cologne city (only Rodenkirchen and Lindenthal districts)
1990	60	Köln II	Cologne city (only Rodenkirchen and Lindenthal districts)
1994	60	Köln II	Cologne city (only Rodenkirchen and Lindenthal districts)
1998	60	Köln II	Cologne city (only Rodenkirchen and Lindenthal districts)
2002	95	Köln II	Cologne city (only Rodenkirchen and Lindenthal districts and Altstadt-Süd and Neustadt-Süd Stadtteile from Innenstadt district)
2005	95	Köln II	Cologne city (only Rodenkirchen and Lindenthal districts and Altstadt-Süd and Neustadt-Süd Stadtteile from Innenstadt district)
2009	95	Köln II	Cologne city (only Rodenkirchen and Lindenthal districts and Altstadt-Süd and Neustadt-Süd Stadtteile from Innenstadt district)
2013	94	Köln II	Cologne city (only Rodenkirchen and Lindenthal districts and Altstadt-Süd and Neustadt-Süd Stadtteile from Innenstadt district)
2017	94	Köln II	Cologne city (only Rodenkirchen and Lindenthal districts and Altstadt-Süd and Neustadt-Süd Stadtteile from Innenstadt district)
2021	94	Köln II	Cologne city (only Rodenkirchen and Lindenthal districts and Altstadt-Süd and Neustadt-Süd Stadtteile from Innenstadt district)
2025	93	Köln II	Cologne city (only Rodenkirchen and Lindenthal districts and Altstadt-Süd and Neustadt-Süd Stadtteile from Innenstadt district)

== Members ==
The constituency was first represented by Hermann Pünder of the Christian Democratic Union (CDU) from 1949 to 1957, followed by fellow CDU members Fritz Hellwig until 1961 and Carl Hesberg until 1969. It was won by the Social Democratic Party (SPD) in 1969 and represented by Katharina Focke. She was succeeded in 1980 by Anke Fuchs for a single term. The CDU regained the constituency in 1983, and Heribert Blens served from then until 1998, when former member Fuchs was elected representative for another term. She was succeeded by in 2002 by fellow SPD member Lale Akgün. Michael Paul of the CDU won the constituency in 2009 and served until 2013. Heribert Hirte was elected in 2013 and re-elected in 2017. Sven Lehmann of the Greens won the constituency in 2021 and was re-elected in 2025.

Election	Member	Party	%
1949	Hermann Pünder	CDU	44.9
1953	Hermann Pünder	CDU	54.5
1957	Fritz Hellwig	CDU	60.6
1961	Carl Hesberg	CDU	50.3
1965	Carl Hesberg	CDU	50.0
1969	Katharina Focke	SPD	50.9
1972	Katharina Focke	SPD	54.7
1976	Katharina Focke	SPD	47.7
1980	Anke Fuchs	SPD	44.0
1983	Heribert Blens	CDU	50.2
1987	Heribert Blens	CDU	45.2
1990	Heribert Blens	CDU	41.9
1994	Heribert Blens	CDU	43.2
1998	Anke Fuchs	SPD	44.5
2002	Lale Akgün	SPD	43.9
2005	Lale Akgün	SPD	43.8
2009	Michael Paul	CDU	34.9
2013	Heribert Hirte	CDU	40.0
2017	Heribert Hirte	CDU	34.9
2021	Sven Lehmann	GRÜNE	34.6
2025	Sven Lehmann	GRÜNE	34.1

== Election results ==
=== 2025 election ===
Federal election (2025): Cologne II
Notes:	Blue background denotes the winner of the electorate vote. Pink background denotes a candidate elected from their party list. Yellow background denotes an electorate win by a list member, or other incumbent. A ✓ or ✗ denotes status of any incumbent, win or lose respectively.						
Party	Candidate	Votes	%	±%	Party votes	%	±%
Greens	✓ Sven Lehmann	72,858	34.1	▼0.5	55,085	25.8	▼6.2
CDU	Daniel Otte	59,925	28.1	▲3.1	53,426	25.0	▲4.5
SPD	Marion Sollbach	35,124	16.5	▼3.2	37,916	17.7	▼3.4
Left	Lea Reisner	18,454	8.6	▲4.3	28,762	13.4	▲8.4
AfD	Christer Cremer	12,775	6.0	▲3.2	13,444	6.3	▲3.4
FDP	Heinz Kaspar	8,061	3.8	▼4.5	12,933	6.0	▼6.9
BSW					6,017	2.8	
Volt	Klaudia Grote	4,534	2.1	▲0.1	2,330	1.1	0.0
Tierschutzpartei					1,448	0.7	▼0.1
PARTEI				▼1.6	986	0.5	▼0.5
FW	Michael Joos	881	0.4	▼0.3	432	0.2	▼0.2
BD	Michael Marx	567	0.3		181	0.1	
PdF					334	0.2	▲0.1
dieBasis				▼0.1	237	0.1	▼0.8
Team Todenhöfer					215	0.1	▼0.4
Independent	Martin Przybylski	208	0.1				
MERA25					90	0.0	0.0
Values					54	0.0	
MLPD				▼0.1	31	0.0	0.0
Pirates							▼0.3
Humanists							▼0.1
ÖDP							▼0.1
Gesundheitsforschung							▼0.1
Bündnis C							0.0
SGP							0.0
Informal votes		1,213			679		
Total valid votes		213,387			213,921		
Turnout		214,600	88.0	▲3.5			
Greens gain from CDU	Majority	19,740	9.6				

=== 2021 election ===
Federal election (2021): Cologne II
Notes:	Blue background denotes the winner of the electorate vote. Pink background denotes a candidate elected from their party list. Yellow background denotes an electorate win by a list member, or other incumbent. A ✓ or ✗ denotes status of any incumbent, win or lose respectively.						
Party	Candidate	Votes	%	±%	Party votes	%	±%
Greens	Sven Lehmann	70,658	34.6	▲20.0	65,240	31.9	▲16.4
CDU	Sandra von Möller	50,918	25.0	▼9.9	41,834	20.5	▼8.0
SPD	Marion Sollbach	40,103	19.7	▼7.2	43,193	21.1	▲1.6
FDP	Joachim Krämer	16,950	8.3	▼0.7	26,470	13.0	▼4.2
Left	Matthias Birkwald	8,771	4.3	▼3.7	10,399	5.1	▼5.6
AfD	Luca Leittersdorf	5,587	2.7	▼1.9	5,891	2.9	▼2.2
Volt	Olivier Fuchs	4,111	2.0		2,323	1.1	
PARTEI	Judit Géczi	3,312	1.6	▼0.3	1,898	0.9	▼0.2
dieBasis	Markus Hoffleit	2,005	1.0		1,773	0.9	
Tierschutzpartei					1,646	0.8	▲0.3
Team Todenhöfer					1,049	0.5	
FW	Torsten Ilg	1,369	0.7		792	0.4	▲0.2
Pirates					558	0.3	0.0
Humanists					182	0.1	0.0
V-Partei3					165	0.1	▼0.1
ÖDP					159	0.1	0.0
Gesundheitsforschung					127	0.1	0.0
LIEBE					110	0.1	
du.					104	0.1	
LfK					102	0.0	
Bündnis C					83	0.0	
PdF					64	0.0	
NPD					53	0.0	0.0
LKR					39	0.0	
MLPD	Mahdi Rezai	117	0.1	▼0.1	31	0.0	0.0
DKP	Walter Stehling	82	0.0		36	0.0	0.0
SGP					12	0.0	0.0
Informal votes		972			622		
Total valid votes		203,983			204,333		
Turnout		204,955	84.5	▲2.4			
Greens hold	Majority	12,933	6.0				

=== 2017 election ===
Federal election (2017): Cologne II
Notes:	Blue background denotes the winner of the electorate vote. Pink background denotes a candidate elected from their party list. Yellow background denotes an electorate win by a list member, or other incumbent. A ✓ or ✗ denotes status of any incumbent, win or lose respectively.						
Party	Candidate	Votes	%	±%	Party votes	%	±%
CDU	✓ Heribert Hirte	68,657	34.9	▼5.1	56,165	28.5	▼7.0
SPD	Elfi Scho-Antwerpes	52,880	26.9	▼6.0	38,485	19.5	▼6.8
Greens	Sven Lehmann	28,716	14.6	▲0.1	30,630	15.5	▼0.1
FDP	Annette Wittmütz-Heublein	17,816	9.1	▲6.4	33,760	17.1	▲9.0
Left	Matthias Birkwald	15,704	8.0	▲2.8	21,100	10.7	▲3.8
AfD	Jochen Haugg	9,057	4.6	▲2.5	9,964	5.1	▲1.8
PARTEI	Ingo Trapphagen	3,689	1.9		2,322	1.2	▲0.6
Tierschutzpartei					1,072	0.5	
Pirates					634	0.3	▼1.9
DiB					582	0.3	
FW					368	0.2	0.0
AD-DEMOKRATEN					350	0.2	
BGE					332	0.2	
V-Partei³					292	0.1	
ÖDP					235	0.1	▼0.1
Die Humanisten					190	0.1	
DM					153	0.1	
NPD					107	0.1	▼0.3
Gesundheitsforschung					105	0.1	
Volksabstimmung					97	0.0	▼0.1
MLPD	Mahdi Rezai	242	0.1		85	0.0	0.0
DKP					38	0.0	
SGP					12	0.0	0.0
Informal votes		1,218			901		
Total valid votes		196,761			197,078		
Turnout		197,979	82.2	▲3.2			
CDU hold	Majority	15,777	8.0	▲0.8			

=== 2013 election ===
Federal election (2013): Cologne II
Notes:	Blue background denotes the winner of the electorate vote. Pink background denotes a candidate elected from their party list. Yellow background denotes an electorate win by a list member, or other incumbent. A ✓ or ✗ denotes status of any incumbent, win or lose respectively.						
Party	Candidate	Votes	%	±%	Party votes	%	±%
CDU	Heribert Hirte	73,011	40.0	▲5.1	64,909	35.5	▲7.2
SPD	Elfi Scho-Antwerpes	59,975	32.8	▲0.4	48,190	26.3	▲4.4
Greens	Volker Beck	26,426	14.5	▼1.1	28,642	15.6	▼4.2
Left	Matthias Birkwald	9,521	5.2	▼0.4	12,689	6.9	▼0.1
FDP	Hans Hermann Stein	4,762	2.6	▼8.2	14,871	8.1	▼10.9
AfD	Stephan Boyens	3,839	2.1		5,955	3.3	
Pirates	Andreas Gärtner	3,677	2.0		4,072	2.2	▲0.3
PARTEI					1,030	0.6	
NPD	Thorsten Peter März	783	0.4	▼0.2	596	0.3	▼0.1
FW	Joachim Orth	583	0.3		403	0.2	
Nichtwahler					364	0.2	
ÖDP					328	0.2	0.0
PRO					245	0.1	
Volksabstimmung					213	0.1	0.0
BIG					132	0.1	
REP					103	0.1	▼0.1
Party of Reason					96	0.1	
RRP					53	0.0	▼0.1
MLPD					43	0.0	0.0
BüSo	Johannes David Themba Faku	107	0.1		38	0.0	0.0
PSG					37	0.0	0.0
Die Rechte					10	0.0	
Informal votes		1,478			1,143		
Total valid votes		182,684			183,019		
Turnout		184,162	79.0	▲2.1			
CDU hold	Majority	13,036	7.2	▲4.7			

=== 2009 election ===
Federal election (2009): Cologne II
Notes:	Blue background denotes the winner of the electorate vote. Pink background denotes a candidate elected from their party list. Yellow background denotes an electorate win by a list member, or other incumbent. A ✓ or ✗ denotes status of any incumbent, win or lose respectively.						
Party	Candidate	Votes	%	±%	Party votes	%	±%
CDU	Michael Paul	59,710	34.9	▲0.3	48,545	28.3	▼1.1
SPD	✗ Lale Akgün	55,471	32.4	▼11.4	37,665	22.0	▼11.2
Greens	Volker Beck	26,614	15.5	▲5.6	34,040	19.8	▲3.2
FDP	Werner Hoyer	18,455	10.8	▲3.1	32,663	19.0	▲4.7
Left	Matthias Birkwald	9,550	5.6	▲2.1	12,138	7.1	▲2.3
Pirates					3,237	1.9	
NPD	Erwine Lehming	1,131	0.7	▲0.1	809	0.5	▲0.1
Tierschutzpartei					755	0.4	▲0.1
RENTNER					341	0.2	
FAMILIE					337	0.2	0.0
ÖDP					252	0.1	
REP					227	0.2	0.0
RRP					207	0.1	
Volksabstimmung					129	0.1	0.0
Centre					67	0.0	0.0
DVU					48	0.0	
MLPD	Gottfried Schweizer	281	0.2		41	0.0	0.0
PSG					28	0.0	0.0
BüSo					27	0.0	0.0
Informal votes		1,350			1,006		
Total valid votes		171,212			171,556		
Turnout		172,562	76.9	▼4.0			
CDU gain from SPD	Majority	4,239	2.5				

=== 2005 election ===
Federal election (2005): Cologne II
Notes:	Blue background denotes the winner of the electorate vote. Pink background denotes a candidate elected from their party list. Yellow background denotes an electorate win by a list member, or other incumbent. A ✓ or ✗ denotes status of any incumbent, win or lose respectively.						
Party	Candidate	Votes	%	±%	Party votes	%	±%
SPD	✓ Lale Akgün	75,703	43.8	▼0.1	57,525	33.2	▼3.2
CDU	Rolf Bietmann	59,855	34.6	▲0.4	50,944	29.4	▼1.3
Greens	Volker Beck	17,238	10.0	▼2.3	28,785	16.6	▼2.5
FDP	Werner Hoyer	13,225	7.6	▲0.3	24,935	14.4	▲3.6
Left	Matthias W. Birkwald	6,079	3.5	▲2.3	8,338	4.8	▲3.0
NPD	Alexander Klein	887	0.5		601	0.3	▲0.2
GRAUEN					799	0.5	▲0.2
Tierschutzpartei					590	0.3	▲0.1
Familie					312	0.2	▲0.1
REP					247	0.1	
From Now on... Democracy Through Referendum					105	0.1	
PBC					87	0.1	
Socialist Equality Party					61	0.0	
BüSo					45	0.0	
Centre					43	0.0	
MLPD					44	0.0	0.0
Informal votes		965			491		
Total valid votes		172,987			173,461		
Turnout		173,952	80.9	▼0.4			
SPD hold	Majority	15,848	9.2				
