= Südpfalz =

Federal electoral district of Germany

210 Südpfalz
- Electoral district for the Bundestag
- Südpfalz in 2025
- State: Rhineland-Palatinate
- Population: 286,400 (2019)
- Electorate: 216,108 (2025)
- Major settlements: Landau; Germersheim; Wörth am Rhein
- Area: 1,186.2 km^{2}

Current electoral district
- Created: 1965
- Party: CDU
- Member: Thomas Gebhart
- Elected: 2025

Südpfalz is an electoral constituency (German: Wahlkreis) represented in the Bundestag. It elects one member via first-past-the-post voting. Under the current constituency numbering system, it is designated as constituency 210. It is located in southern Rhineland-Palatinate, comprising the city of Landau and the districts of Germersheim and Südliche Weinstraße.

Südpfalz was created for the 1965 federal election. Since 2025, it has been represented by Thomas Gebhart of the Christian Democratic Union (CDU).

== Geography ==
Südpfalz is located in southern Rhineland-Palatinate. As of the 2021 federal election, it comprises the independent city of Landau and the districts of Germersheim and Südliche Weinstraße.

== History ==
Südpfalz was created in 1965, then known as Landau. It acquired its current name in the 1987 election. In the 1965 through 1976 elections, it was constituency 163 in the numbering system. In the 1980 through 1998 elections, it was number 161. In the 2002 election, it was number 214. In the 2005 election, it was number 213. In the 2009 and 2013 elections, it was number 212. In the 2017 and 2021 elections, it was number 211. From the 2025 election, it has been number 210.

Originally, the constituency comprised the city of Landau, and the districts of Landkreis Landau, Germersheim, and Bergzabern. In the 1972 and 1976 elections, it comprised the city of Landau, and the districts of Landau-Bad Bergzabern and Germersheim. It acquired its current borders in the 1980 election.

Election	No.	Name	Borders
1965	163	Landau	Landau city; Landkreis Landau district; Germersheim district; Bergzabern district
1969	163	Landau	Landau city; Landkreis Landau district; Germersheim district; Bergzabern district
1972	163	Landau	Landau city; Landau-Bad Bergzabern district; Germersheim district
1976	163	Landau	Landau city; Landau-Bad Bergzabern district; Germersheim district
1980	161	Landau	Landau city; Germersheim district; Südliche Weinstraße district
1983	161	Landau	Landau city; Germersheim district; Südliche Weinstraße district
1987	161	Südpfalz	Landau city; Germersheim district; Südliche Weinstraße district
1990	161	Südpfalz	Landau city; Germersheim district; Südliche Weinstraße district
1994	161	Südpfalz	Landau city; Germersheim district; Südliche Weinstraße district
1998	161	Südpfalz	Landau city; Germersheim district; Südliche Weinstraße district
2002	214	Südpfalz	Landau city; Germersheim district; Südliche Weinstraße district
2005	213	Südpfalz	Landau city; Germersheim district; Südliche Weinstraße district
2009	212	Südpfalz	Landau city; Germersheim district; Südliche Weinstraße district
2013	212	Südpfalz	Landau city; Germersheim district; Südliche Weinstraße district
2017	211	Südpfalz	Landau city; Germersheim district; Südliche Weinstraße district
2021	211	Südpfalz	Landau city; Germersheim district; Südliche Weinstraße district
2025	210	Südpfalz	Landau city; Germersheim district; Südliche Weinstraße district

== Members ==
The constituency has been held by the Christian Democratic Union (CDU) during all but one Bundestag term since its creation. It was first represented by Albert Leicht from 1965 to 1980. Heiner Geißler served from 1980 to 2002. Ralf Göbel was then representative from 2002 to 2009. Thomas Gebhart was elected in 2009, and re-elected in 2013 and 2017. Thomas Hitschler won the constituency for the Social Democratic Party (SPD) in 2021, but lost to Thomas Gebhart of the CDU in 2025.

Election	Member	Party	%
1965	Albert Leicht	CDU	51.9
1969	Albert Leicht	CDU	52.0
1972	Albert Leicht	CDU	49.3
1976	Albert Leicht	CDU	53.5
1980	Heiner Geißler	CDU	50.0
1983	Heiner Geißler	CDU	55.7
1987	Heiner Geißler	CDU	49.6
1990	Heiner Geißler	CDU	49.6
1994	Heiner Geißler	CDU	50.9
1998	Heiner Geißler	CDU	47.1
2002	Ralf Göbel	CDU	43.5
2005	Ralf Göbel	CDU	43.2
2009	Thomas Gebhart	CDU	40.7
2013	Thomas Gebhart	CDU	48.8
2017	Thomas Gebhart	CDU	40.3
2021	Thomas Hitschler	SPD	28.2
2025	Thomas Gebhart	CDU	38.2

== Election results ==
=== 2025 election ===
Federal election (2025): Südpfalz
Notes:	Blue background denotes the winner of the electorate vote. Pink background denotes a candidate elected from their party list. Yellow background denotes an electorate win by a list member, or other incumbent. A ✓ or ✗ denotes status of any incumbent, win or lose respectively.						
Party	Candidate	Votes	%	±%	Party votes	%	±%
CDU	Thomas Gebhart	68,122	38.2	▲10.0	55,080	30.8	▲7.6
AfD	Bernd Schattner	35,589	20.0	▲10.2	37,867	21.2	▲10.8
SPD	Yildiz Härtel	34,273	19.2	▼9.0	30,705	17.2	▼10.5
Greens	Obada Barmou	13,802	7.7	▼3.5	19,800	11.1	▼2.4
Left	Jens Schwaab	7,114	4.0	▲0.9	10,928	6.1	▲2.8
BSW	Sina Listmann	5,361	3.0	New	7,690	4.3	New
FDP	Ralf Stüber	4,686	2.6	▼7.4	7,684	4.3	▼8.1
FW	Dieter Kaltenhauser	4,097	2.3	▼1.5	3,363	1.9	▼1.4
Tierschutzpartei	Manuela Baker-Kriebel	3,060	1.7	▼0.1	2,485	1.4	▼0.4
Volt	Jonathan Simantzik	2,083	1.2	▲0.7	1,560	0.9	▲0.4
PARTEI					840	0.5	▼0.4
ÖDP					276	0.2	▼0.1
BD					231	0.1	New
MLPD					68	<0.1	0.0
Informal votes		1,717			1,327		
Total valid votes		178,187			178,577		
Turnout		179,904	83.2	▲4.3			
CDU gain from SPD	Majority	32,533	18.2	N/A			

=== 2021 election ===
Federal election (2021): Südpfalz
Notes:	Blue background denotes the winner of the electorate vote. Pink background denotes a candidate elected from their party list. Yellow background denotes an electorate win by a list member, or other incumbent. A ✓ or ✗ denotes status of any incumbent, win or lose respectively.						
Party	Candidate	Votes	%	±%	Party votes	%	±%
SPD	Thomas Hitschler	47,901	28.2	▲2.2	47,028	27.7	▲5.8
CDU	✗ Thomas Gebhart	47,860	28.2	▼12.1	39,421	23.2	▼11.6
Greens	Tobias Lindner	19,058	11.2	▲3.3	22,882	13.5	▲4.8
FDP	Volker Wissing	17,011	10.0	▲4.0	21,120	12.4	▲2.1
AfD	Bernd Schattner	16,658	9.8	▼2.5	17,702	10.4	▼3.2
FW	Steffen Weiß	6,388	3.8	▲1.1	5,493	3.2	▲1.6
Left	Tobias Schreiner	5,222	3.1	▼1.6	5,598	3.3	▼3.1
Tierschutzpartei	Bernd Kriebel	3,019	1.8		3,098	1.8	
dieBasis	Jacqueline Sharma	2,388	1.4		2,389	1.4	
PARTEI	Lukas Rammefanger	1,923	1.1		1,515	0.9	▼0.1
Volt	Alexandra Barsuhn	829	0.5		779	0.5	
Team Todenhöfer					665	0.4	
Pirates					659	0.4	▼0.1
ÖDP	Sven Leuthner	582	0.3		471	0.3	0.0
Independent	Erdal Koccu	362	0.2				
Independent	Cyrus Mobasheri	225	0.1				
NPD					218	0.1	▼0.2
Independent	Holger Volger	206	0.1				
V-Partei3					194	0.1	▼0.2
DiB					182	0.1	
Humanists					151	0.1	
LKR					73	0.0	
MLPD					38	0.0	0.0
Informal votes		1,627			1,583		
Total valid votes		169,632			169,676		
Turnout		171,259	78.9	▼0.3			
SPD gain from CDU	Majority	41	0.0				

=== 2017 election ===
Federal election (2017): Südpfalz
Notes:	Blue background denotes the winner of the electorate vote. Pink background denotes a candidate elected from their party list. Yellow background denotes an electorate win by a list member, or other incumbent. A ✓ or ✗ denotes status of any incumbent, win or lose respectively.						
Party	Candidate	Votes	%	±%	Party votes	%	±%
CDU	✓ Thomas Gebhart	68,588	40.3	▼8.5	59,309	34.8	▼7.9
SPD	Thomas Hitschler	44,224	26.0	▼2.0	37,293	21.9	▼4.1
AfD	Heiko Wildberg	20,932	12.3		23,191	13.6	▲8.7
Greens	Tobias Lindner	13,500	7.9	▲0.8	14,788	8.7	▼0.2
FDP	Mario Brandenburg	10,209	6.0	▲2.0	17,560	10.3	▲4.1
Left	Simon Georg Bludovsky	8,018	4.7	▲0.6	10,975	6.4	▲1.6
FW	Bernd Ließfeld	4,540	2.7	▲0.6	2,814	1.7	▲0.3
PARTEI					1,706	1.0	
Pirates					796	0.5	▼2.2
NPD					537	0.3	▼0.9
V-Partei³					520	0.3	
ÖDP					462	0.3	▼0.2
BGE					391	0.2	
MLPD					65	0.0	0.0
Informal votes		2,358			1,962		
Total valid votes		170,011			170,407		
Turnout		172,369	79.2	▲5.8			
CDU hold	Majority	24,364	14.3	▼6.5			

=== 2013 election ===
Federal election (2013): Südpfalz
Notes:	Blue background denotes the winner of the electorate vote. Pink background denotes a candidate elected from their party list. Yellow background denotes an electorate win by a list member, or other incumbent. A ✓ or ✗ denotes status of any incumbent, win or lose respectively.						
Party	Candidate	Votes	%	±%	Party votes	%	±%
CDU	✓ Thomas Gebhart	75,748	48.8	▲8.2	66,523	42.7	▲8.4
SPD	Thomas Hitschler	43,385	28.0	▲0.2	40,537	26.0	▲3.3
Greens	Tobias Lindner	11,064	7.1	▼2.1	13,172	8.5	▼1.8
Left	Sebastian Frech	6,308	4.1	▼3.1	7,538	4.8	▼3.7
FDP	Volker Wissing	6,217	4.0	▼8.7	9,677	6.2	▼10.9
AfD					7,584	4.9	
Pirates	Kim Julia Orth	4,608	3.0		4,091	2.6	▲0.5
FW	Franz Alois Pietruska	3,159	2.0		2,166	1.4	
NPD	Klaus Armstroff	2,082	1.3	▼0.8	1,833	1.2	▼0.3
REP	Frank Herbert Karl Köhler	1,605	1.0		1,233	0.8	▼0.5
ÖDP	Rüdiger John	940	0.6		660	0.4	0.0
Party of Reason					410	0.3	
PRO					349	0.2	
MLPD					71	0.0	0.0
Informal votes		3,545			2,817		
Total valid votes		155,116			155,844		
Turnout		158,661	73.4	▲0.5			
CDU hold	Majority	32,363	20.8	▲7.8			

=== 2009 election ===
Federal election (2009): Südpfalz
Notes:	Blue background denotes the winner of the electorate vote. Pink background denotes a candidate elected from their party list. Yellow background denotes an electorate win by a list member, or other incumbent. A ✓ or ✗ denotes status of any incumbent, win or lose respectively.						
Party	Candidate	Votes	%	±%	Party votes	%	±%
CDU	Thomas Gebhart	61,994	40.7	▼2.6	52,517	34.3	▼2.9
SPD	Heinz Schmitt	42,287	27.7	▼9.9	34,790	22.7	▼9.9
FDP	Volker Wissing	19,431	12.7	▲6.5	26,201	17.1	▲5.0
Greens	Tobias Lindner (Note: Lindner entered the Bundestag on the Greens list after the resignation of Ulrike Höfken in June 2011.)	12,637	8.3	▲3.5	15,635	10.2	▲2.3
Left	Ernst Jakob Kuntz	10,926	7.2	▲3.3	13,137	8.6	▲3.7
Pirates					3,322	2.2	
NPD	Karlheinz Pfirrmann	3,230	2.1	▲0.8	2,272	1.5	▲0.2
REP					1,980	1.3	▼0.8
FAMILIE					1,889	1.2	▼0.1
Independent	Edeltraud Dietert	1,197	0.8				
Independent	Wolfgang Berger	728	0.5				
ÖDP					609	0.4	
PBC					575	0.4	▼0.1
DVU					134	0.1	
MLPD					59	0.0	▼0.1
Informal votes		3,719			3,029		
Total valid votes		152,430			153,120		
Turnout		156,149	72.9	▼7.0			
CDU hold	Majority	19,707	13.0	▲7.3			

=== 2005 election ===
Federal election (2005):Südpfalz
Notes:	Blue background denotes the winner of the electorate vote. Pink background denotes a candidate elected from their party list. Yellow background denotes an electorate win by a list member, or other incumbent. A ✓ or ✗ denotes status of any incumbent, win or lose respectively.						
Party	Candidate	Votes	%	±%	Party votes	%	±%
CDU	✓ Ralf Göbel	70,851	43.2	▼0.2	60,911	37.2	▼3.7
SPD	Heinz Schmitt	61,710	37.7	▼2.4	53,394	32.6	▼3.7
FDP	Volker Wissing	10,276	6.3	▼1.4	19,833	12.1	▲2.7
Greens	Tobias Lindner	7,794	4.8	▼0.8	13,034	8.0	▼0.2
Left	Michael Plum	6,413	3.9	▲2.9	7,932	4.8	▲3.9
REP	Alfons Brauns	3,418	2.1		3,453	2.1	▲0.8
Familie					2,238	1.4	
NPD	Karlheinz Pfirrmann	2,090	1.2	▼0.1	2,128	1.3	▲0.6
PBC	Michael Heinzmann	1,317	0.8	0.0	835	0.5	0.0
MLPD					153	0.1	
Informal votes		3,873			3,831		
Total valid votes		163,869			163,911		
Turnout		167,742	79.9	▼1.9			
CDU hold	Majority	9,141	5.5				
