= Anke Fuchs =

German politician and lawyer (1937–2019)

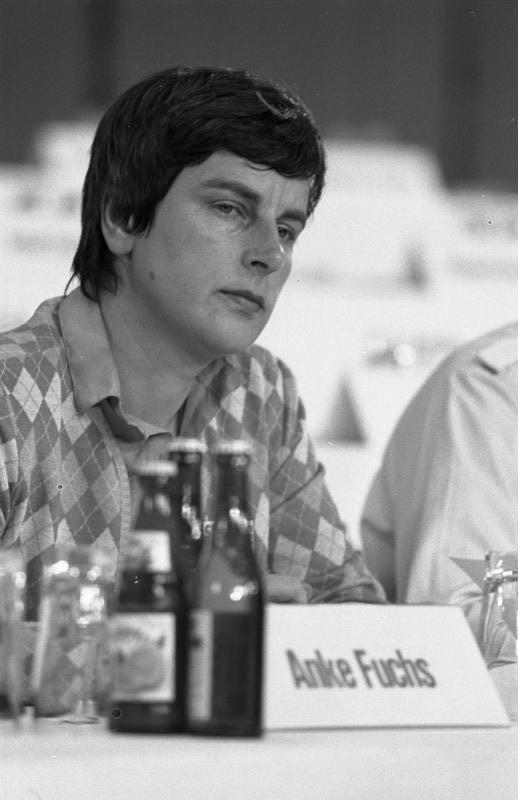
- Anke Fuchs in 1982

Federal Minister for Youth, Family and Health
- In office 28 April 1982 – 1 October 1982
- Chancellor: Helmut Schmidt
- Preceded by: Antje Huber
- Succeeded by: Heiner Geißler

Personal details
- Born: Anke Nevermann; 5 July 1937 Hamburg, Germany
- Died: 14 October 2019 (aged 82) Wilhelmshaven, Lower Saxony, Germany
- Party: Social Democratic Party (SPD)
- Profession: Lawyer

Anke Fuchs (pronounced [ˈaŋkə ˈfʊks]; née Nevermann; 5 July 1937 – 14 October 2019) was a German lawyer and politician of the Social Democratic Party of Germany. She was Federal Minister for Youth, Family and Health (1982) and Vice President of the Bundestag (1998–2002). From 2003 until 2010, she was the president of the Friedrich Ebert Foundation.

== Life and career ==
She was born Anke Nevermann in Hamburg, the daughter of Paul Nevermann who later became mayor of Hamburg, and his wife Grete. Her parents met at home politicians such as Herbert Wehner, Kurt Schumacher, Wilhelm Pieck and Otto Grotewohl. Her parents, both grandfathers and two brothers were party members of the Social Democratic Party (SPD). She joined the party's youth organisation (Falken) as a school student, and was active in demonstrations against atomic weapons. She became a party member in 1956, shortly before her Abitur. The same year, she began to study law, completing with the Zweites Staatsexamen in 1964. She then worked as Referentin für Arbeitsrecht und Sozialpolitik for Deutscher Gewerkschaftsbund (DGB) for the Nordmark district. She was member of the board of the IG Metall from 1971 to 1978.

In 1977, Fuchs was appointed Secretary of State in the Federal Ministry of Labour and Social Affairs by the then minister Herbert Ehrenberg. In 1979, she became a member of the board (Parteivorstand) of the SPD. She was elected to the Bundestag in 1980 as a candidate from the Cologne II district in North Rhine-Westphalia.

On 28 April 1982, Fuchs was appointed Federal Minister for Youth, Family and Health by Chancellor Helmut Schmidt. Following the election victory of the conservative opposition, she had to leave the cabinet on 4 October 1982. She was offered candidacy for minister-president in Lower Saxony in the 1980s, but declined in favour of Gerhard Schröder. In 1990, she was the SPD candidate for the position in Saxony, but the CDU with Kurt Biedenkopf won the election.

Fuchs was a member of the Bundestag until 2002. She was vice president of its SPD fraction from 1993 to 1998, and she served as Vice President of the Bundestag from 1998 to 2002. For many years she was president of the Deutscher Mieterbund (German tenants' association), and she was president of the Friedrich Ebert Foundation from 2003 to 2010. She focused on national and international political education, support of young scientists in international cooperation, and European politics for peace and social reforms. She was honorary president from 2010.

Fuchs was married and had two children. She died on 14 October 2019 after a long illness, at the age of 82.

== Works ==
- Anke Fuchs (1991). Mut zur Macht: Selbsterfahrung in der Politik (in German). Hamburg: Hoffmann und Campe. ISBN 3-455-08428-1.
