= Thomas Gebhart =

German politician (born 1971)

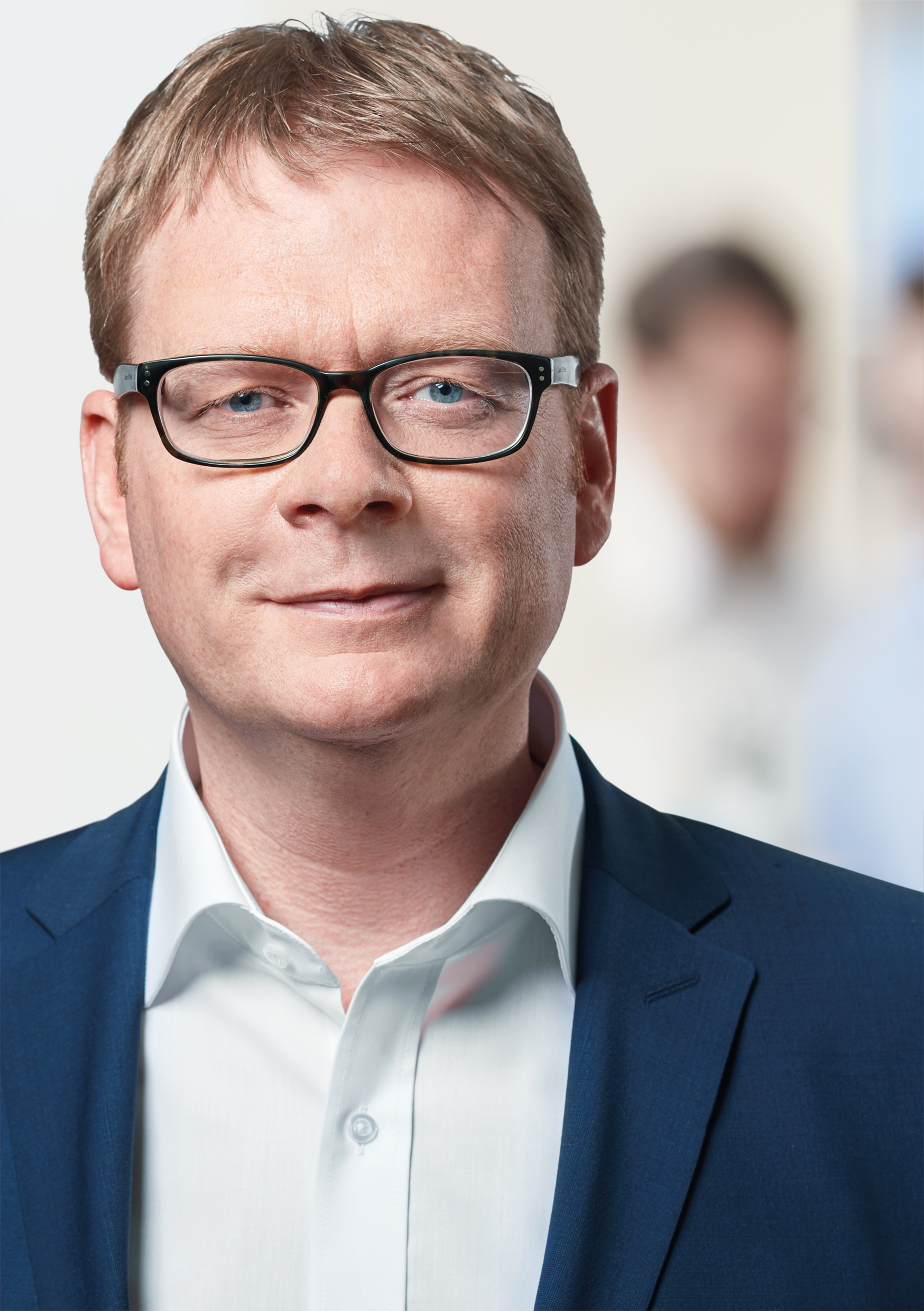
- Gebhart in 2014

Member of the Bundestag
- Incumbent
- Assumed office 2009
- Preceded by: Ralf Göbel

Personal details
- Born: 20 December 1971 (age 54) Kandel, West Germany (now Germany)
- Party: CDU
- Children: 1
- Education: University of Mannheim; Aston University

Thomas Gebhart (born 20 December 1971) is a German politician of the Christian Democratic Union (CDU) who has been serving as a member of the Bundestag from the state of Rhineland-Palatinate since 2009.

From 2018 until 2021, Gebhart served (alongside Sabine Weiss) one of two Parliamentary State Secretaries for Health.

== Early career ==
In 1998, Gebhart worked as parliamentary assistant to Heiner Geißler. From 2002 until 2003, he was an employee of German chemical company BASF.

== Political career ==
=== Career in state politics ===
From 2003 until 2009, Gebhart was a member of the State Parliament of Rhineland-Palatinate. He served as his parliamentary group's spokesperson on environmental policy from 2006 until 2009.

=== Member of the German Parliament, 2009–present ===
Gebhart first became a member of the Bundestag in the 2009 German federal election. From 2009 until 2017, he served on the Committee on the Environment, Nature Conservation, Building and Nuclear Safety.

From 2018 to 2021, Gebhart was (alongside Sabine Weiss) one of two Parliamentary State Secretaries for Health.

In addition to his committee assignments, Gebhart is a member of the German-British Parliamentary Friendship Group and the German-French Parliamentary Friendship Group. He has been a member of the German delegation to the Franco-German Parliamentary Assembly since 2022.

== Political positions ==
In June 2017, Gebhart voted against his parliamentary group’s majority and in favor of Germany’s introduction of same-sex marriage.

In 2019, Gebhart joined 14 members of his parliamentary group who, in an open letter, called for the party to rally around Angela Merkel and party chairwoman Annegret Kramp-Karrenbauer amid criticism voiced by conservatives Friedrich Merz and Roland Koch. Ahead of the Christian Democrats’ leadership election, he publicly endorsed in 2020 Armin Laschet to succeed Kramp-Karrenbauer as the party’s chair.
