= Third Way (Germany) =

The Third Way Der Dritte Weg
- Chairman: Matthias Fischer
- Founder: Klaus Armstroff
- Founded: 28 September 2013; 13 years ago Heidelberg, Baden-Württemberg
- Split from: NPD, Free Network South
- Headquarters: Weidenthal
- Youth wing: Nationalrevolutionäre Jugend (NRJ)
- Membership: ▲1,000 (2026) est.
- Ideology: Pan-Germanism; German ultranationalism Revolutionary nationalism Neo-Nazism; Strasserism; Antisemitism; Third Position
- Political position: Far-right
- Colours: Green
- Anthem: Der III. Weg Marschiert!

Party flag

Website
- der-dritte-weg.info

The III. Way or The Third Way (German: Der III. Weg, Der Dritte Weg) is an ultranationalist and neo-Nazi political party in Germany.

It was founded on 28 September 2013 by former NPD officials, and activists from the banned Free Network South. They formerly had ties with Bashar al-Assad's government in Syria, and they currently have ties with Hezbollah in Lebanon, the National Corps, Misanthropic Division, Right Sector and Svoboda in Ukraine, and the Nordic Resistance Movement in the Nordic countries. Their founder and chairman until 2021 was Klaus Armstroff. The party mostly operates in Thuringia, Bavaria and Brandenburg.

== Name ==
The party is registered at the Federal Returning Office as "DER DRITTE WEG" short-form: "III. Weg". According to the party's website, the official English translation of the name is "The Third Way", stylized as "THE THIRD WAY". Despite this, the party's name is commonly translated as "The Third Path" or "The III. Path".

== History ==
Video of Third Path demonstration on 15 October 2016 in Fürth

Third way was founded in Heidelberg on 28 September 2013 by Klaus Armstroff, a former official of the Rhineland-Palatinate NPD, with the other five founding members of its federal board also being former NPD members. According to the Federal Office for the Protection of the Constitution (BfV) the party is "particularly linked to the programme of the so-called left wing of the NSDAP around the Strasser brothers" arguing for "German Socialism" and the "preservation and development of the biological substance of the people."

Third way participated in its first election In May 2014 earning 0.5% of the vote in Bad Dürkheim and in the 2016 election received 0.1% of the vote in Rhineland-Palatinate. In a 2015 report by the BfV it was estimated that the Third Way had ~300 full time members mostly in Rhineland-Palatinate but with a smaller presence in East Westphalia, Lower Saxony, Brandenburg and Saxony. In 2014 their Bavarian section absorbed the membership of the banned Free Network South.

A group of people bearing Der Dritte Weg flags marched in through a town in Saxony on 1 May 2019, the day before the Jewish remembrance of the Holocaust, carrying a banner saying "Social justice instead of criminal foreigners". The Central Council of Jews said that the state government should ban such marches if it were serious about tackling right-wing extremism. The party stood in the 2019 European elections, achieving 0.03% of the vote.

Der Dritte Weg has sent a delegation to the annual neo-Nazi 612 march in Finland. In 2019 the event was attended by then leader of the party Armstroff.

During the 2021 German federal election, the party had controversial posters which called for Hang the Greens. These posters were ordered to be taken down by the courts later on.

In 2025, the party won a seat in the North Rhine-Westphalia local elections.

== Structure ==
In Bavaria, the six "bases" in 2014 reflected the centers of the former comradeships. In 2019, the party succeeded in expanding its structures, albeit only slightly. Accordingly, only three of the planned four regional associations have been founded so far. The party has not yet succeeded in establishing structures in the north of Germany. At the federal party conference in September 2019, Der III. Weg decided to amend its statutes to restructure the regional associations into state associations. The party had previously taken part in the local elections in Saxony in 2019, but was denied participation in the state elections in Saxony on September 1, 2019, by the state election committee for formal reasons. With the amendments to the statutes, the party underlined its intention to continue to contest elections in the future and thus fulfil or consolidate one of the requirements necessary to maintain party status.

In 2019, the estimated number of members/followers/supporters nationwide increased to around 580. As of 2021, the majority of the approximately 650 full and supporting members were active in the federal states of Bavaria, Berlin, Brandenburg, Rhineland-Palatinate and Saxony, and since 2019 also in NRW in the greater Cologne-Düsseldorf area.

=== Funding ===
According to the constitutional protection report of the state of North Rhine-Westphalia, the party is mainly financed by donations and contributions in 2019.

== Ideology and platform ==
The party describes itself as national revolutionary and partially bases its platform on the ideology of the Strasser Brothers of the early Nazi Party. On its website, the party presents a 10-point election program, available in 12 European languages.

=== Immigration policy ===
Protesters of the III. Path holding a banner titled "Stop the asylum seekers flood!"

The III. Path has widely been described as a ultranationalist and neo-Nazi party. With regard to immigration, the III. Path is warning of a "Volkstod" and abuse of asylum, and is stirring up anti-refugee sentiment with flyers titled "stop the asylum seekers flood".

The party frequently engages in charitable activities such as donating goods and clothing to the homeless as part of its Winterhilfe program, but is excluding refugees as well as alcohol and drug addicts from it. The program has been described as a deliberate reference to the Nazi era's Winterhilfswerk.

=== Economic policy ===
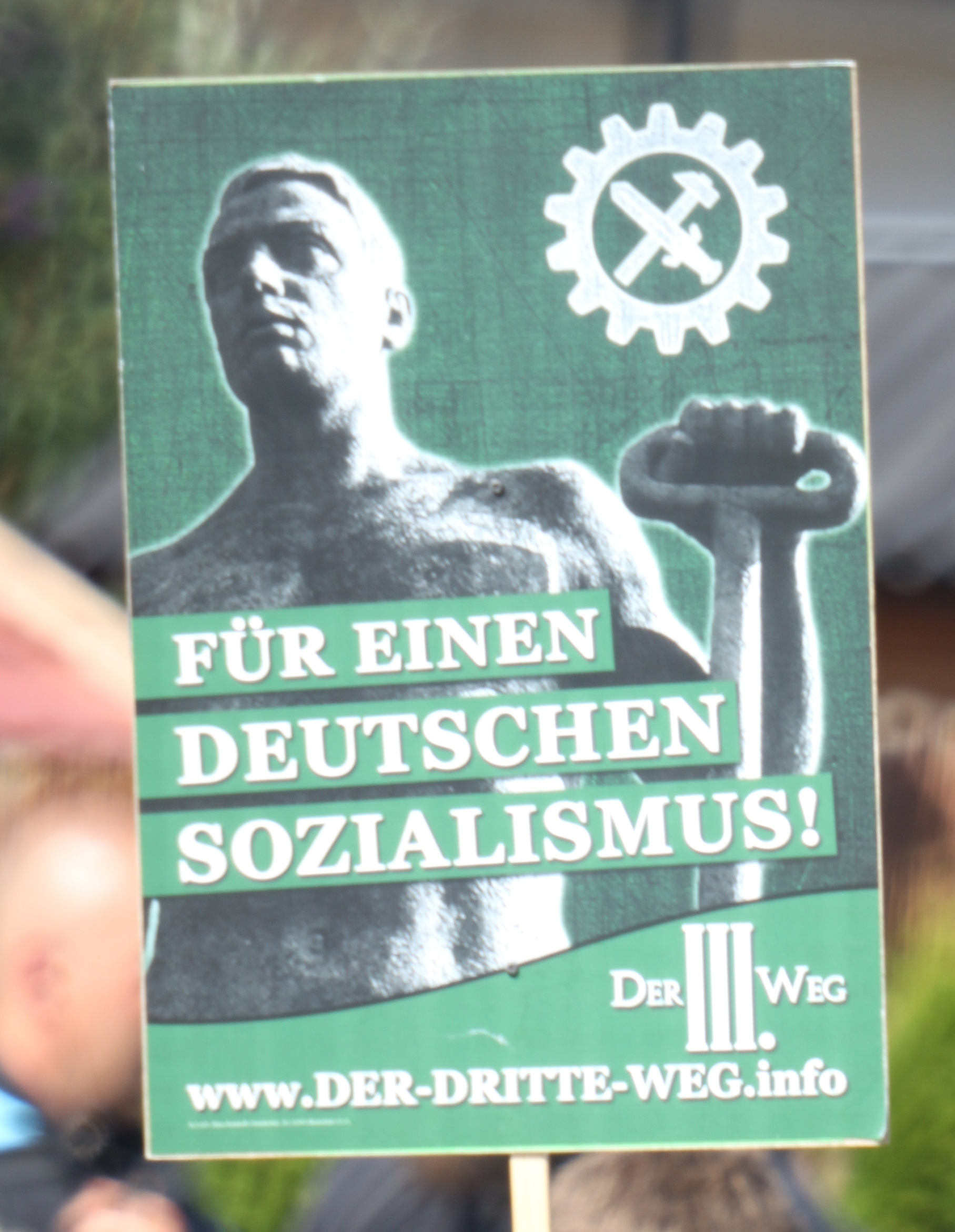
Party poster: "For a German socialism!"

In its economic policy, the III. Path is advocating for a German socialism as a middle ground between capitalism and communism, and supports welfare chauvinism while promoting families with many children. The party calls for most economic sectors to be transferred to state ownership.

=== Foreign policy ===
Regarding the Russo-Ukrainian war, the party maintains a pro-Ukraine position, and is strongly critical of Russia, describing the country as "Europe's greatest foreign policy threat" and criticizing it for being a multi-ethnic state. The III. Path is also strongly opposed to Israel, calling it an "imperialist terrorist state" and a "Zionist entity".

=== Environmental policy ===
According to the bpb, "environmental protection in the spirit of a "natural Volksgemeinschaft" is a central topic" of the party. In its environmental policy, the party opposes nuclear energy and lignite mining, and supports an energy transition in order to preserve the "Heimat" and protect the forests. The party publicly advocates for animal welfare and, on New Year's Eve, spoke out against fireworks and instead called for donating money to animal shelters.

== Election results ==
=== Federal Parliament (Bundestag) ===
| Election | Constituency | | Party list | | Seats | +/– | Status |
| Election | Votes | % | Votes | % | Seats | +/– | Status |
|---|---|---|---|---|---|---|---|
| 2021 | 515 | 0.00 | 7,832 (#32) | 0.02 | 0 / 631 | New | Extra-parliamentary |

=== European Parliament ===
| Election | Votes | % | Seats | +/– |
|---|---|---|---|---|
| 2019 | 12,756 | 0.03 (#40) | 0 / 96 | New |

=== State elections ===
| Year | RLP | | BB | |
| Year | Votes | % | Votes | % |
|---|---|---|---|---|
| 2016 | 1,944 | 0.09 | | |
| 2024 | | | 1,810 | 0.12 |

== See also ==
- Far-right politics in Germany
- Strasserism
- Neo-Nazism in Germany
- Völkisch movement
- List of political parties in Germany
