= Heribert Hirte =

German politician and legal scholar

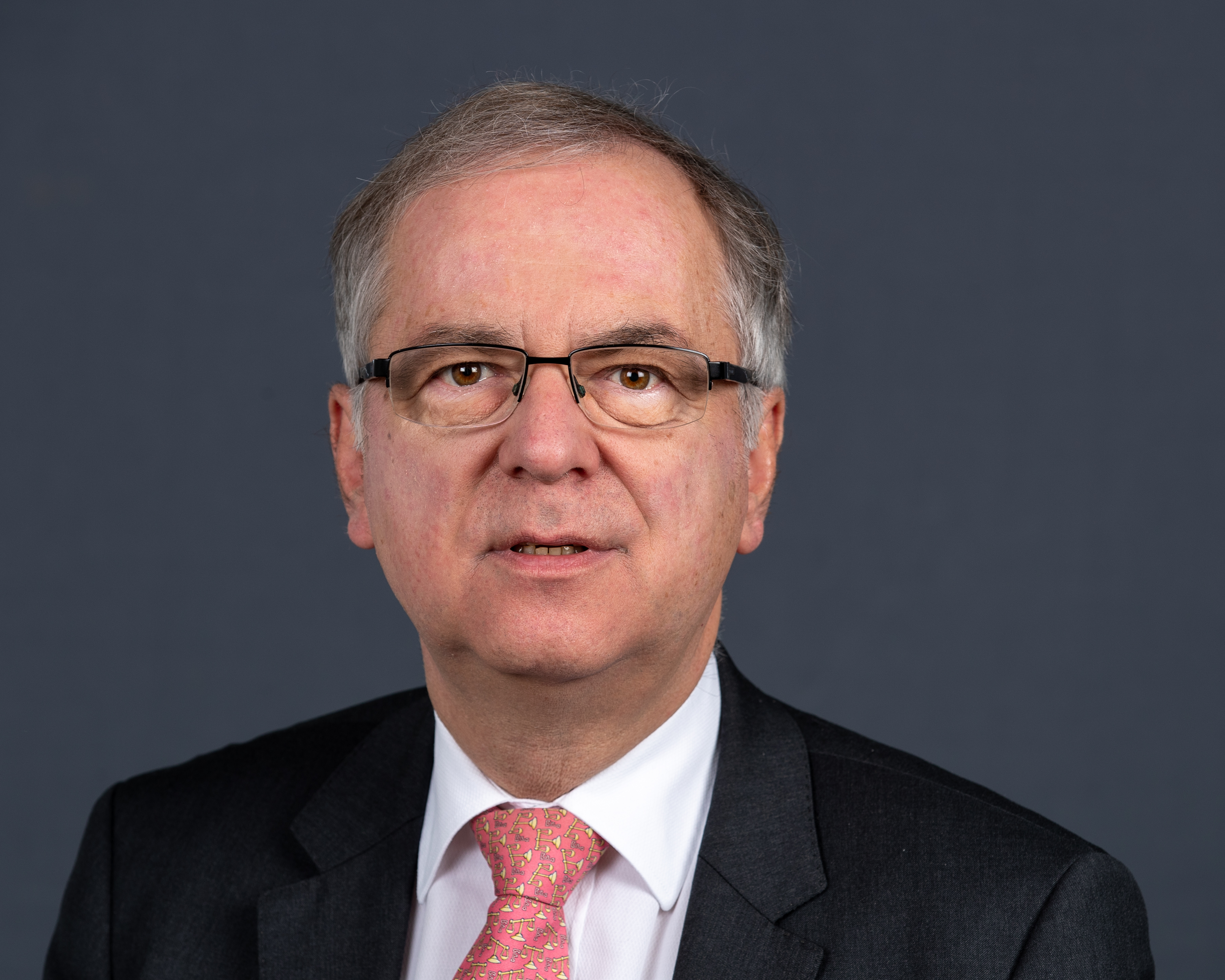
- Hirte in 2020

Member of the Bundestag
- In office 2013–2021

Personal details
- Born: 31 March 1958 (age 68) Köln, West Germany
- Party: CDU
- Education: University of Cologne

Heribert Hirte (born 31 March 1958) is a German legal scholar and politician of the Christian Democratic Union (CDU) who served as a member of the Bundestag from the state of North Rhine-Westphalia from 2013 until 2021.

== Political career ==
Born in Cologne, North Rhine-Westphalia, Hirte became a member of the Bundestag in the 2013 German federal election, representing the Cologne II district. He was a member of the Committee on Legal Affairs and Consumer Protection and the Committee on European Affairs. In 2019, he took over as chairman of the Committee on Legal Affairs and Consumer Protection after his predecessor Stephan Brandner was voted out of office by all the other members of the committee. He has also been chairing the Subcommittee on European Law since 2018.

In addition to his committee assignments, Hirte was part of the German-American Parliamentary Friendship Group, the German-Italian Parliamentary Friendship Group and the German-Belgian Parliamentary Friendship Group. From 2019 until 2021, he was a member of the German delegation to the Franco-German Parliamentary Assembly.

Ahead of the 2021 elections, Hirte failed to win his party's support for another candidacy in the Cologne II district; he was succeeded by Sandra von Möller as the CDU candidate for the upcoming election.

== Other activities ==
=== Corporate boards ===
- Stadtwerke Köln, Member of the supervisory board (2018-2020)

=== Non-profit organizations ===
- Transparency Germany, Member of the Board (since 2022)
- Max Planck Institute for Biology of Ageing, Member of the Board of Trustees
- European Law Faculties Association (ELFA), Member of the Board (2005-2009)

== Political positions ==
In June 2017, Hirte voted against his parliamentary group's majority and in favor of Germany's introduction of same-sex marriage.

Ahead of the Christian Democrats' leadership election, Hirte publicly endorsed in 2020 Armin Laschet to succeed Annegret Kramp-Karrenbauer as the party's chair.

In September 2020, Hirte was one of 15 members of her parliamentary group who joined Norbert Röttgen in writing an open letter to Minister of the Interior Horst Seehofer which called on Germany and other EU counties to take in 5000 immigrants who were left without shelter after fires gutted the overcrowded Mória Reception and Identification Centre on the Greek island of Lesbos.
