= Klaus Armstroff =

German politician

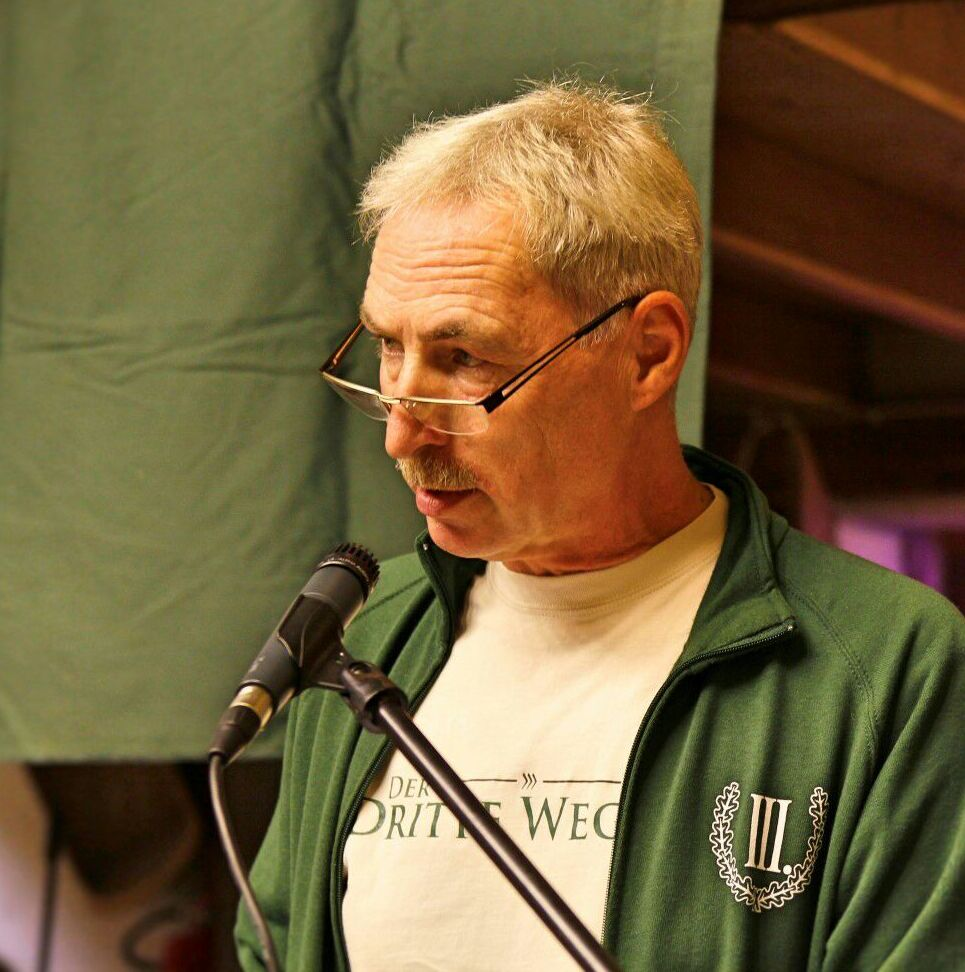
- Armstroff in 2017

Leader of The Third Way
- In office 2013–2021
- Preceded by: position established
- Succeeded by: Matthias Fischer

Personal details
- Born: 1957 (age 68–69) Jena, German Democratic Republic
- Party: Third Way (2013–); National Democratic Party of Germany (–2013)
- Spouse: Dörthe Armstroff

Klaus Armstroff (born 1957) is a German politician and neo-Nazi. He was the founder of the political party Third Way, and served as its leader until 2021.

== Life ==
Armstroff was born in 1957 in Jena, East Germany. He trained as an electrician and after German reunification he settled in Weidenthal. He joined the National Democratic Party of Germany (NPD); and in the 2009 Rhineland-Palatinate local elections, he was elected to the district council of Bad Dürkheim. Thereafter, he became a member of the party's leadership committee in the state of Rhineland-Palatinate. Armstroff's wife, Dörthe Armstroff, served the leader of the party in the state of Rhineland-Palatinate until summer 2013. In the 2013 German federal election, he was the NPD's candidate in the constituency of Südpfalz. He finished in 8th place with 2,082 votes (1.3%). In 2013, he was involved in ideological disputes within the National Democratic Party due to his support for Strasserism. He also opposed the election of Markus Walter and Ricarda Riefling to the party's Rhineland-Palatinate executive board. As a result of these conflicts, he left the party that year.

On 28 September 2013 Armstroff founded the Third Way political party, and was elected as its leader at the party's founding conference in Heidelberg. In 2014, the party absorbed many members of the Free Network South, after the group had been banned by Bavarian authorities. At the party's 2014 conference, he instructed members to hold protests outside of locations housing refugees. In 2019, he participated in the 612 March in Helsinki, Finland. During a police search on Armstroff's home in 2020, police found a party membership application from a man named Nikolai G, who would later go on to become the perpetrator of the 2022 Heidelberg University shooting. In November 2021, he handed over the leadership of Third Way to Matthias Fischer. Since then he has served as deputy leader of the party. In October 2022, he was fined €7,000 for his role in distributing posters calling for the lynching of Green politicians during the 2021 German federal election.
