= Thomas Hitschler =

German politician

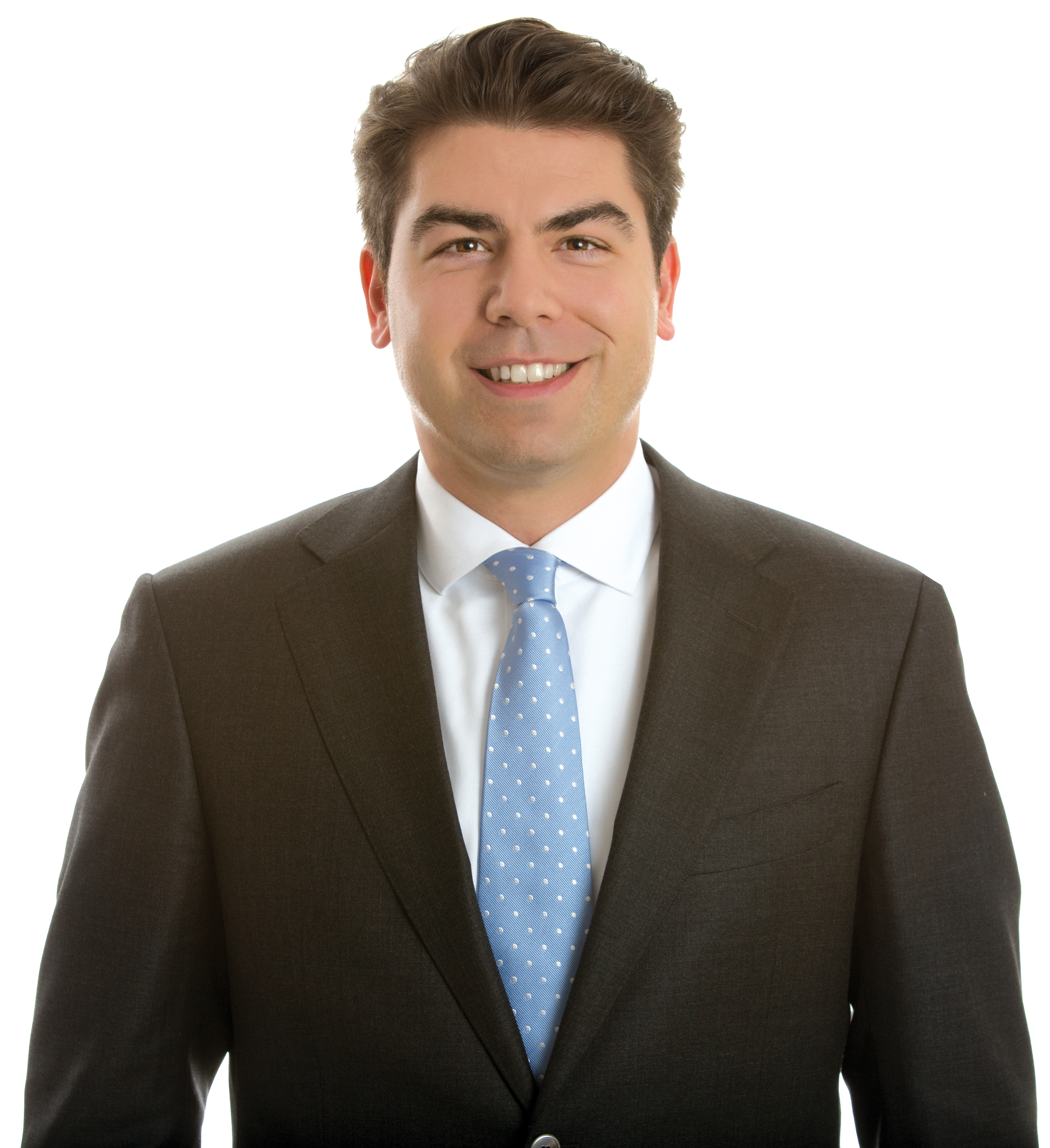
- Thomas Hitschler in 2013

Parliamentary State Secretary for Defense
- In office 8 December 2021 – 6 May 2025 Serving with Siemtje Möller
- Chancellor: Olaf Scholz
- Minister: Christine Lambrecht; Boris Pistorius
- Preceded by: Peter Tauber

Member of the Bundestag
- In office 22 September 2013 – 23 February 2025
- Preceded by: Heinz Schmitt
- Constituency: Südpfalz

Personal details
- Born: 22 June 1982 (age 43) Landau, West Germany (now Germany)
- Party: SPD

Thomas Hitschler (born 27 June 1982) is a German politician of the Social Democratic Party (SPD) who served as a member of the Bundestag from the state of Rhineland-Palatinate from 2013 to 2025.

In addition to his parliamentary work, Hitschler served as Parliamentary State Secretary in the Federal Ministry of Defence in the coalition government of Chancellor Olaf Scholz from 2021 to 2025.

== Political career ==
Hitschler became member of the Bundestag in the 2013 German federal election, representing the Südpfalz district. From 2014 until 2021, he was part of the Defence Committee, where he served as his parliamentary group's rapporteur on the infrastructure of the Bundeswehr. From 2018 until 2021, he has also a member of the Committee on Home Affairs. In 2020 he joined the Parliamentary Oversight Panel (PKGr), which provides parliamentary oversight of Germany’s intelligence services BND, BfV and MAD.

In the negotiations to form a coalition government under the leadership of Chancellor Angela Merkel following the 2017 federal elections, Hitschler was part of the working group on foreign policy, led by Ursula von der Leyen, Gerd Müller and Sigmar Gabriel.

In addition to his committee assignments, Hitschler was a member of the German delegation to the Franco-German Parliamentary Assembly since 2019.

For the 2021 elections, Hitschler was elected to lead the SPD campaign in Rhineland-Palatinate. In the negotiations to form a so-called traffic light coalition of the SPD, the Green Party and the Free Democrats (FDP) following the elections, he was part of his party's delegation in the working group on homeland security, civil rights and consumer protection, co-chaired by Christine Lambrecht, Konstantin von Notz and Wolfgang Kubicki.

In December 2023, Hitschler announced that he would not stand in the 2025 federal elections but instead resign from active politics by the end of the term.

== Other activities ==
- German United Services Trade Union (ver.di), Member
- 1. FC Kaiserslautern, Member
