= Matthias Birkwald =

German politician

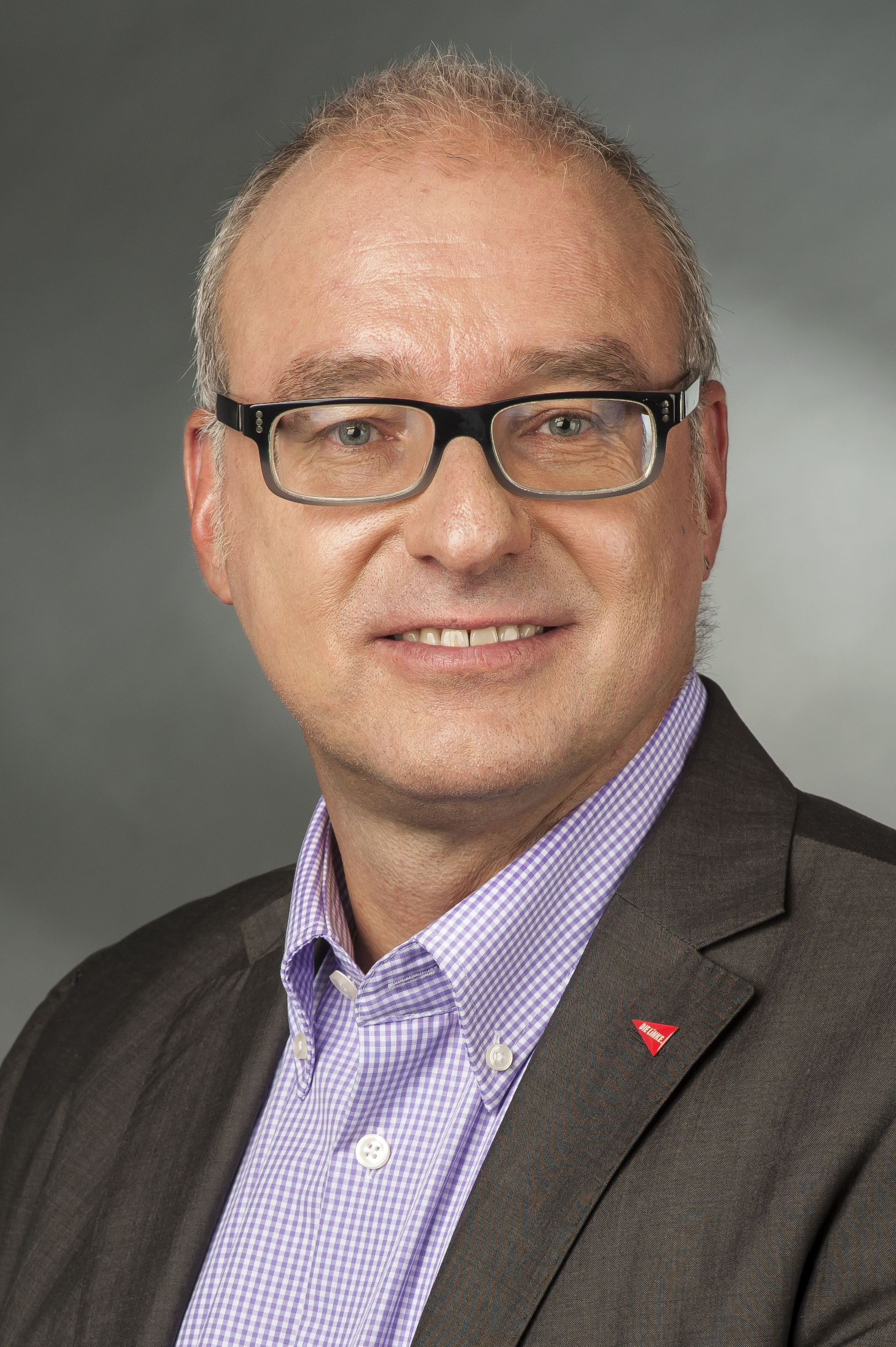

Member of the Bundestag
- Incumbent
- Assumed office 2009

Personal details
- Born: 28 September 1961 (age 64) Münster
- Party: The Left

Matthias W. Birkwald (born 28 September 1961 in Münster) is a German politician (The Left). Since October 2009 he has been a member of the German Bundestag.

== Education and early career ==
Matthias W. Birkwald was born in Münster. He graduated from the Municipal High School in Erftstadt-Lechenich in 1981 and studied Political Science, Sociology, Philosophy and Political Economy in Cologne, Bonn and Bremen. He achieved a degree in 1990 as a graduate social scientist. Especially after his studies, Birkwald was involved in state and federal politics, was a member of the Young Democrats / Young Left NRW, the PDS and the WASG. He ran several times for a seat in the state parliament of NRW and in the Bundestag. From 2003 to 2005, Matthias Birkwald was a personal assistant to the Berlin Senator for social affairs, health and consumer protection, Heidi Knake-Werner, responsible for social affairs and migration. From 2005 to 2009, he served as bureau chief for Lothar Bisky in the German Bundestag.

== Political career ==
From 1980 to 1996 Birkwald was a member of Young Democrats, who were until the turn of 1982 the youth association of the FDP. In 1986 he joined the IG Metall trade union. From 1988 to 1990, Matthias Birkwald was a member of the renewal movement of the German Communist Party in Cologne and in the Rhineland district. From 1990 to 1994 he served as full-time youth education officer and honorary state manager of the Young Democrats / Young Left NRW.

Since the end of 1993, he has been a member of the Democratic Socialist Party (PDS), a member of the WASG since 2005, and since the party's rebuilding, he is now a member of The Left Party. In the PDS, he held several delegate mandates and 1994 campaign director of the North Rhine-Westphalian State Association. From 1994 to 2002 he was a research assistant to the PDS parliamentary group.

Birkwald was the first direct candidate in the federal election in 1994 in Cologne's southwest. In 2000, he joined the PDS as a direct candidate for the NRW state election in Cologne and on the state list. In the federal elections in 2002, 2005, 2009 and 2013 and in the state election in North Rhine-Westphalia in 2005, he was again direct candidate of the PDS and the Left respectively in the constituency of Cologne II and the district constituency Cologne I.

At the merger convention of the party Die Linke in June 2007, Matthias Birkwald participated as a delegate of the Federal Working Group on Citizens' Rights and Democracy. Within the Left, Birkwald has joined the Socialist Left. He acted in the working group "For a modern repression-free, needs-covering social minimum income security" and is committed to a "solidary minimum pension", whose central foundations he developed.

In the federal election on 27 September 2009, Matthias Birkwald moved to the state list of North Rhine-Westphalia in the German Bundestag. He became a full member and chairman of the Left in the Committee on Labor and Social Affairs and pension policy spokesman of his group.

Also in 2013 and 2017 he was re-elected. Since November 2014 he has been the parliamentary director of the parliamentary group of the Left in the German Bundestag.

In 2004 Birkwald announced, that he is not seeking re-election for Bundestag in 2025.

== Works ==
- with Christoph Butterwegge & Gerd Bosbach (ed.): Armut im Alter. Probleme und Perspektiven der sozialen Sicherung (Poverty in old age. Problems and perspectives of social protection). Campus-Verlag, Frankfurt / New York 2012, ISBN 978-3-593-39752-8
