= Lale Akgün =

German politician and member of the SPD

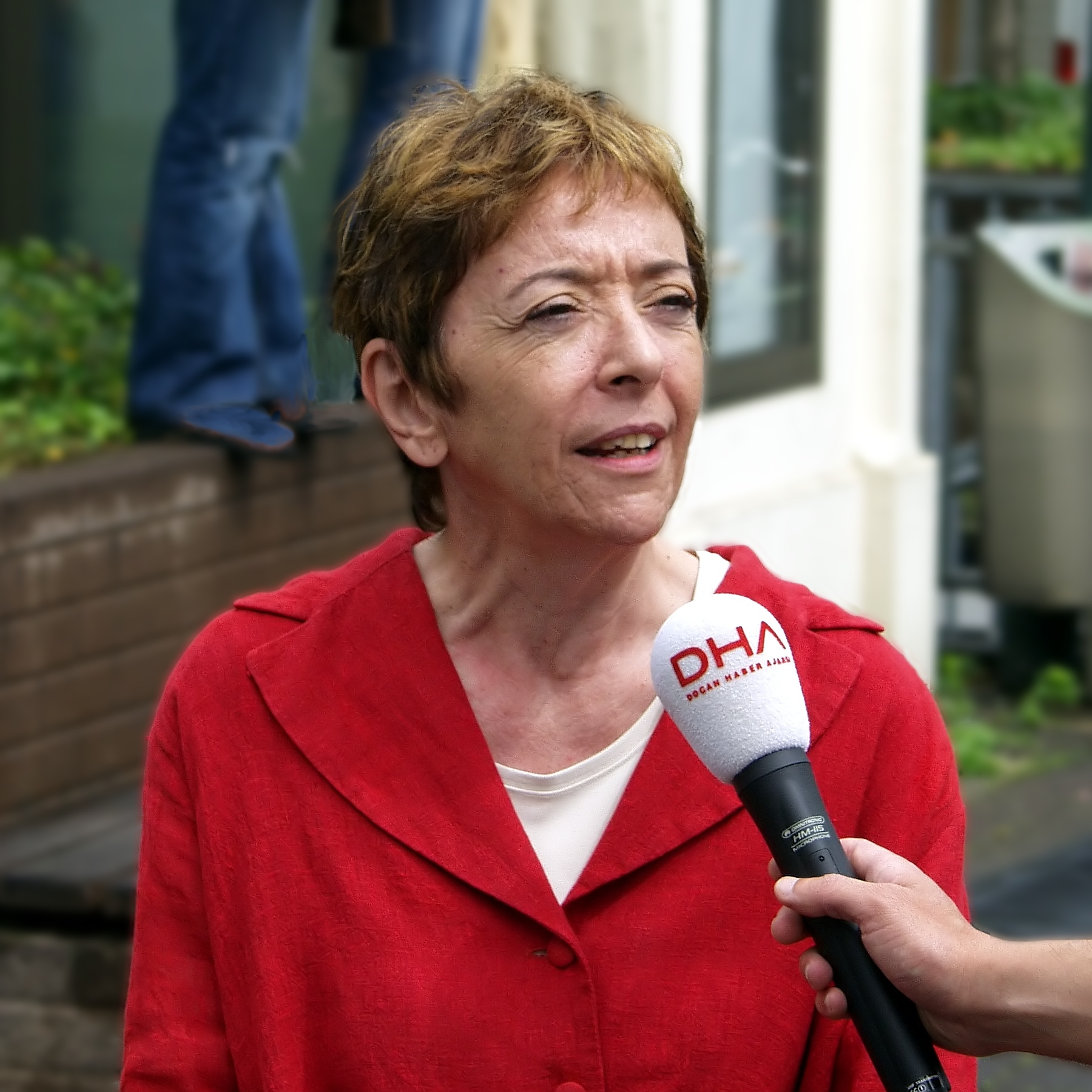
Lale Akgün

Dr. Lale Akgün (born 17 September 1953 in Istanbul, Turkey) is a German politician and member of the SPD. She served as an MP for Cologne II electoral district in the German Bundestag from 2002 to 2009.

== Life ==
Lale Akgün's Turkish family moved to Germany when she was 9. She studied psychology and medicine at Marburg, where she attained a doctorate in the former. Akgün then served in the Cologne city administration in juvenile welfare services/family consultation as the deputy agency chief. Since 1997, she has headed the LzA in North Rhine-Westphalia based in Solingen. Akgün is married with one daughter.
