= Heribert Blens =

German politician (born 1936)

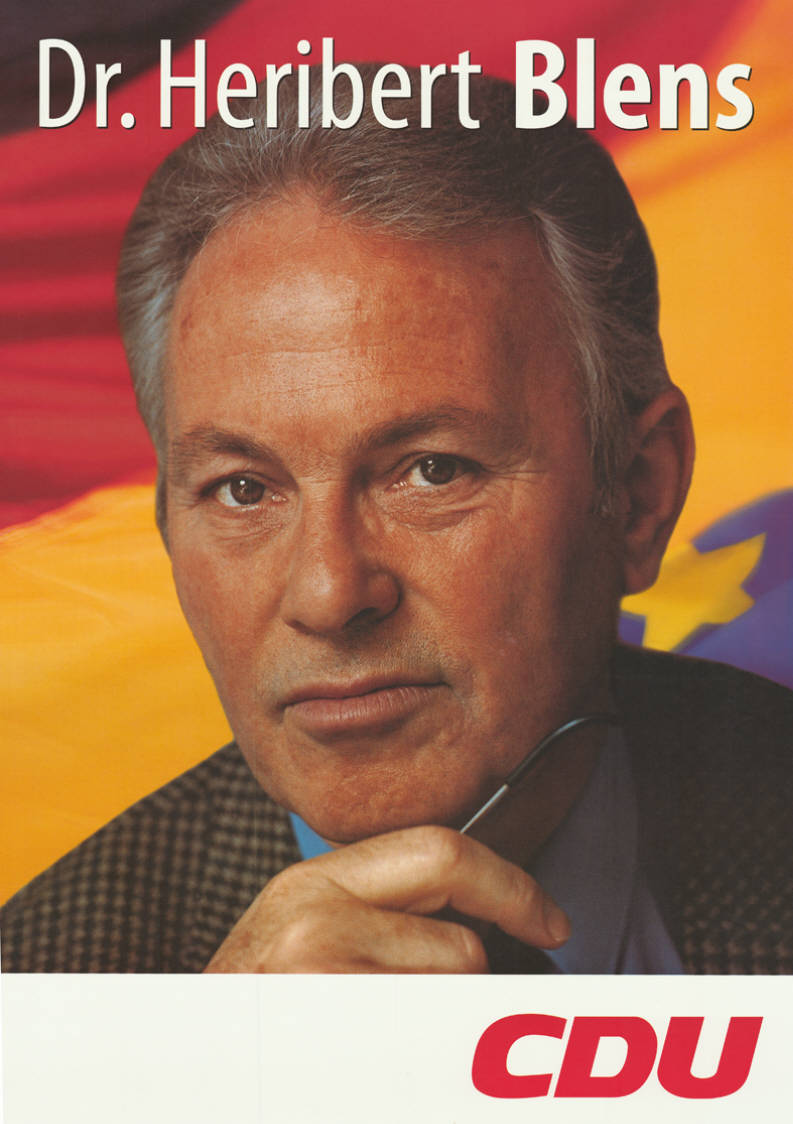
- Candidate poster of Heribert Blens for the Bundestag elections 1998

Member of the Bundestag
- In office 29 March 1983 – 17 October 2002

Personal details
- Born: 19 February 1936 Cologne, West Germany (now Germany)
- Died: 26 January 2025 (aged 88) Cologne, Germany
- Party: CDU

Heribert Blens (19 February 1936 – 26 January 2025) was a German politician of the Christian Democratic Union (CDU) and former member of the German Bundestag.

== Life ==
Blens became a member of the CDU as early as 1955, and from 1969 to 1987 he was a member of the Cologne City Council. He was also one of the mayors of Cologne from 1975 to 1987. Blens had a doctorate in law. After working at the administrative courts in Cologne and Düsseldorf, he was a member of the German Bundestag from 1983 to 2002.
