= Rolf Bietmann =

German politician (born 1954)

Member of the Bundestag
- In office 2002–2005

Personal details
- Born: 18 May 1954 (age 72) Bork, Selm, West Germany
- Party: CDU

Rolf Bietmann (born 18 May 1954) is a German politician. He represents the CDU. Bietmann has served as a member of the Bundestag from the state of North Rhine-Westphalia from 2002 till 2005.
