= Tobias Lindner =

German economist and politician (born 1982)

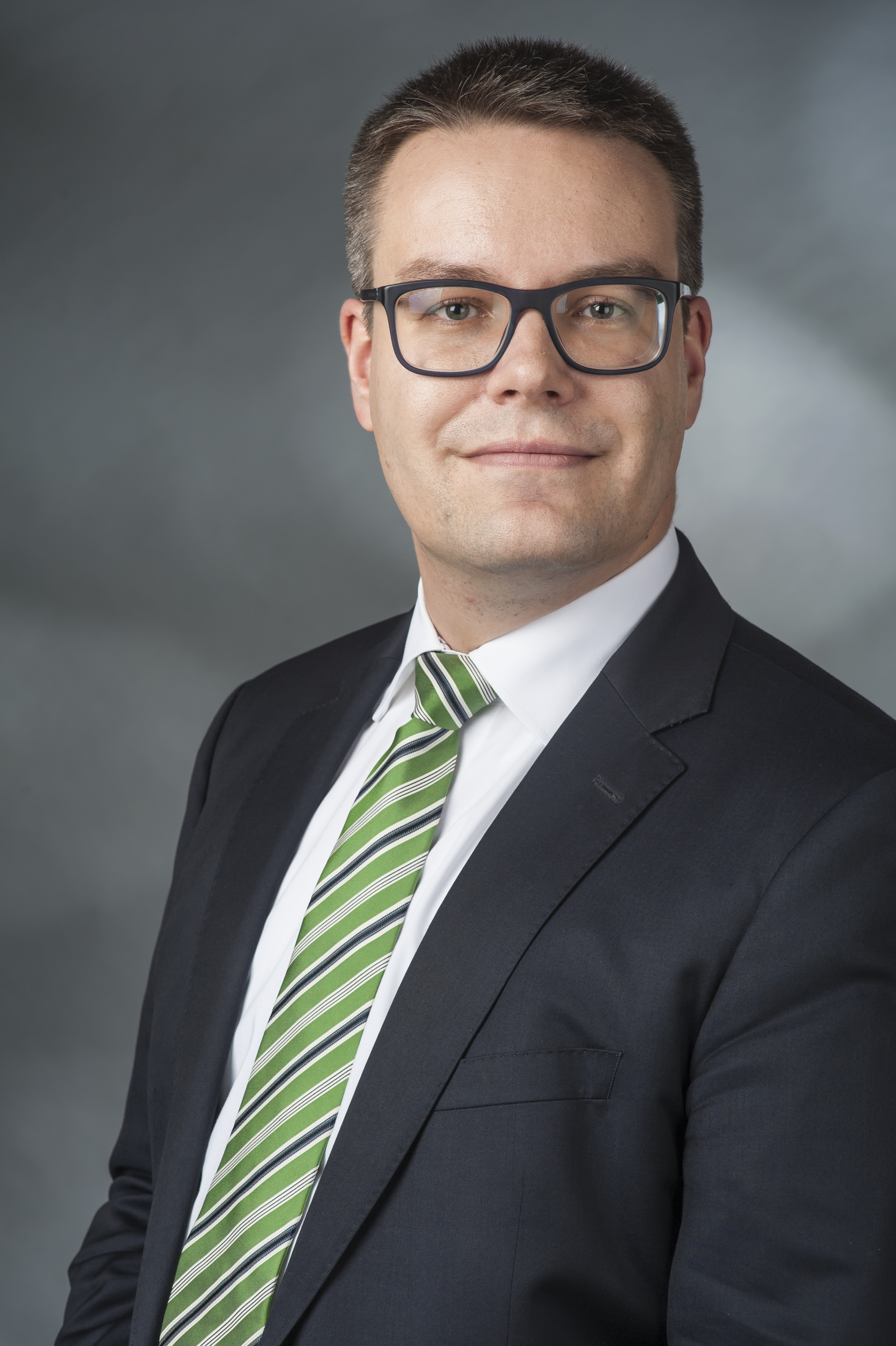

Minister of State
- In office 2021–2025 Serving with: Katja Keul; Anna Lührmann
- Chancellor: Olaf Scholz
- Minister: Annalena Baerbock
- Preceded by: Niels Annen
- Succeeded by: Florian Hahn; Serap Güler; Gunther Krichbaum

Member of the Bundestag
- In office 2011–2025

Personal details
- Born: 11 January 1982 (age 44) Karlsruhe, Baden-Württemberg, West Germany
- Citizenship: German
- Party: Alliance '90/The Greens
- Education: Karlsruhe Institute of Technology

Tobias Lindner (born 11 January 1982) is a German economist and politician of Bündnis 90/Die Grünen who served as member of the Bundestag from 2011 to 2025, as a list member for Rhineland-Palatinate. From 8 December 2021 to 2025, he was Minister of State at the Federal Foreign Office.

== Early life and education ==
Lindner was born on 11 January 1982 in Karlsruhe and went to High School in Wörth am Rhein. After his graduation, he served his alternative civilian service at Baden-Württemberg State Institute for the Environment, Survey and Nature Conservation (LUBW) in Karlsruhe. He pursued his studies in Economics Engineering at the Karlsruhe Institute of Technology (KIT) from 2002 to 2007.

After he obtained his diploma Lindner continued to work for the Chair of Economic Theory as research assistant until June 2011, when he completed his PhD in Political Economy under the supervision of Clemens Puppe Today, Lindner lives in his hometown Wörth am Rhein.

== Political career ==
=== Career in local politics ===
Lindner has been a member of the Association of Alliance 90 / The Greens as of 1998. He joined the Grüne Jugend, the Green Party's youth organization, in 1998 and was elected as spokesperson of the Grüne Jugend in the German Federal State of Rheinland-Pfalz in 2000.

From 2004 until 2011 Lindner served as the chairman of Germersheim county and community Wörth am Rhein. He has been a member of the county council Germersheim since 2007 and has led the parliamentary party from 2009. From 2009 to 2011 he was member of the city council Wörth am Rhein as well as chairman of the parliamentary county council. He represents Rheinland-Pfalz on the Green Party's national committee.

=== Member of Parliament, 2011–2025 ===
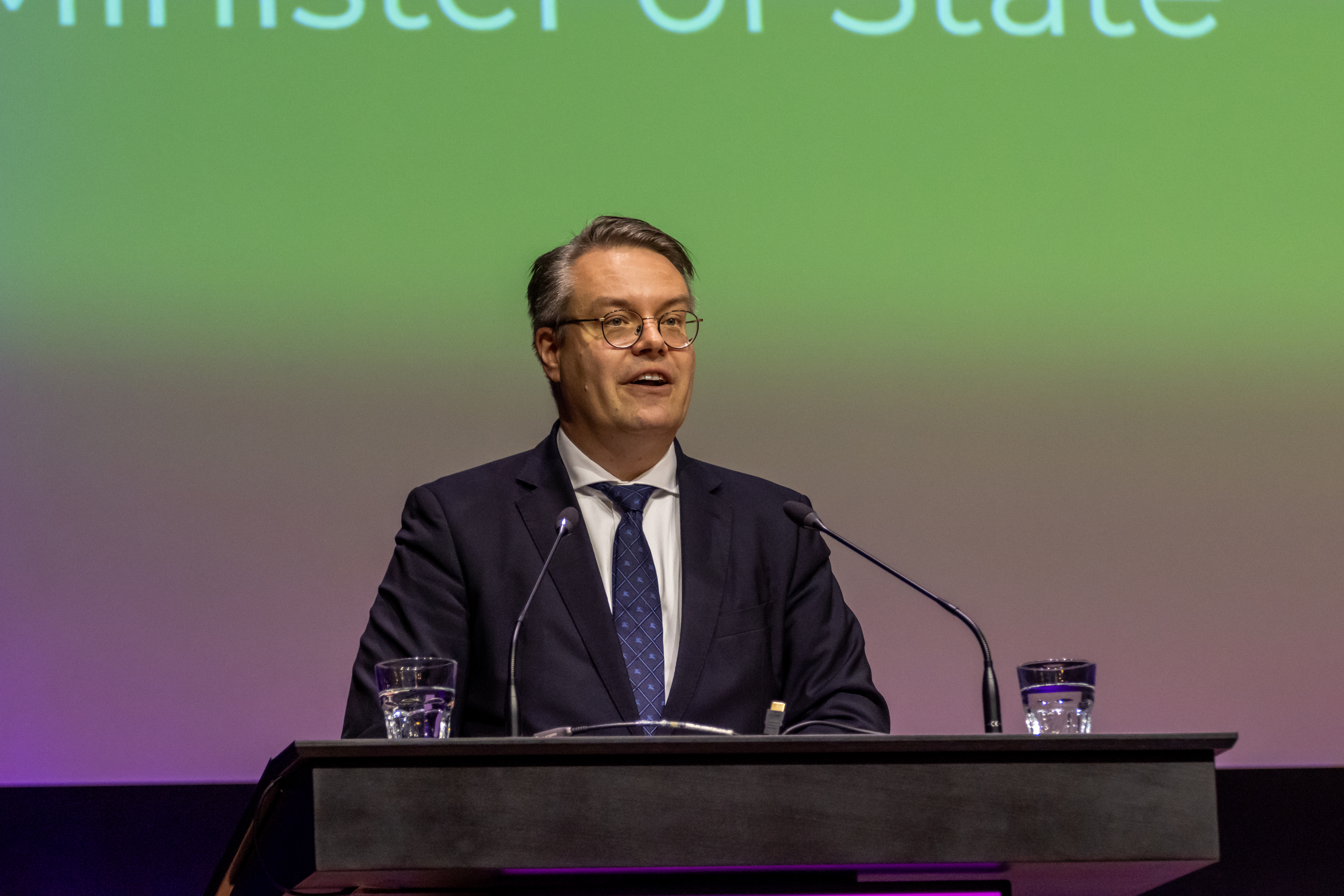
Presenting at the Wikimedia Summit in 2024

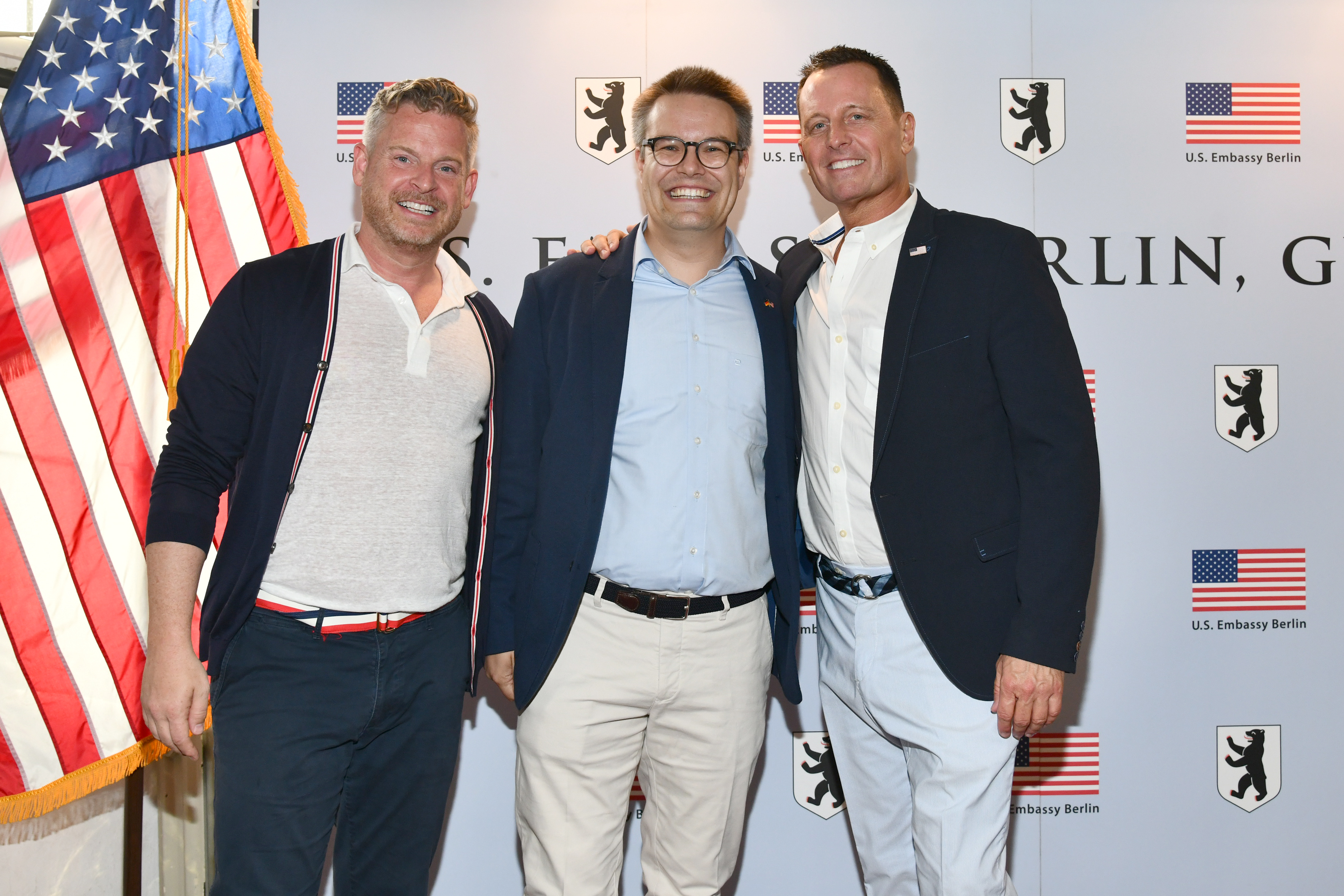
Lindner and U.S. Ambassador to Germany Richard Grenell (right), July 2019

In June 2011, Lindner became a member of the German Parliament when he filled in the seat of Ulrike Höfken who had previously resigned. He served on the Budget Committee, the Audit Committee and the Defence Committee from 2011 until 2021.

On the Budget Committee, Lindner served as his parliamentary group's rapporteur on the budgets of the Federal Ministry of Finance (2014–2017); the Federal Foreign Office (2014–2017); the Federal Court of Auditors (2014–2017); the Federal Ministry of Defence (since 2014); the German Bundesrat (2014–2021); the Federal Ministry of Food and Agriculture (2018); the Federal Ministry of the Interior, Building and Community (2018–2021); and the Federal Commissioner for Data Protection and Freedom of Information (2018–2021). On the Audit Committee, he covered the budgets of the Federal Ministry of Labour and Social Affairs. From 2018 until 2021, he also has been serving on the so-called Confidential Committee (Vertrauensgremium) of the Budget Committee, which provides budgetary supervision for Germany's three intelligence services, BND, BfV and MAD.

In addition to his committee assignments, Lindner has served as deputy chairman of the German-Irish Parliamentary Friendship Group (2011–2013) and of the German-Canadian Parliamentary Friendship Group (since 2014).

In December 2019, Lindner filed a criminal complaint over the erasure of data from a mobile phone owned by Ursula von der Leyen when she was Germany's defense minister, citing suspected deliberate destruction of evidence.

In the negotiations to form a so-called traffic light coalition of the Social Democratic Party (SPD) and the Free Democratic Party (FDP) following the 2021 federal elections, Lindner was part of his party's delegation in the working group on foreign policy, defence, development cooperation and human rights, co-chaired by Heiko Maas, Omid Nouripour and Alexander Graf Lambsdorff.

In July 2024, Lindner announced that he would not stand in the 2025 federal elections but instead resign from active politics by the end of the parliamentary term.

== Political positions ==
=== Military procurement ===
When German Defence Minister Thomas de Maizière cancelled the Euro Hawk surveillance drone program, one of the federal government's key defense projects, which failed because it was unable to fulfill the requirements necessary to be certified to fly in German airspace, Linder sharply criticized the government for "the biggest procurement disaster of the last 20 years."

Lindner called Germany's nuclear sharing agreement "an expensive, dangerous and antiquated symbolic contribution to have a say within NATO."

=== Relations with the African continent ===
Lindner has in the past voted in favor of German participation in United Nations peacekeeping missions as well as in United Nations-mandated European Union peacekeeping missions on the African continent, such as in Darfur/Sudan (2011, 2012, 2013, 2014 and 2015), South Sudan (2011, 2012, 2013, 2014 and 2015), Mali – both EUTM Mali (2013, 2014 and 2015) and MINUSMA (2013, 2014 and 2015) –, and Liberia (2015).

On Somalia, Lindner has a mixed voting record. He initially supported Operation Atalanta (2011) but has since regularly abstained from votes on extending the mandate for the mission (2012, 2013, 2014 and 2015). In 2014, 2015 and 2016, he voted against extending the mandate for participation in EUTM Somalia.

== Career in the private sector ==
Since 2026, Lindner has been working at consultancy PwC's Germany branch.

== Other activities ==
- Berlin Security Conference, Member of the advisory board (since 2022)
- International Journalists' Programmes (IJP), Member of the Board of Trustees (since 2022)
- Institute for Federal Real Estate (BImA), Member of the Supervisory Board
- German Federation of Industrial Research Associations (AiF), Member of the Senate
- Deutsche Industrieforschungsgemeinschaft Konrad Zuse, Member of the Senate
