= Heiner Geißler =

German politician (1930–2017)

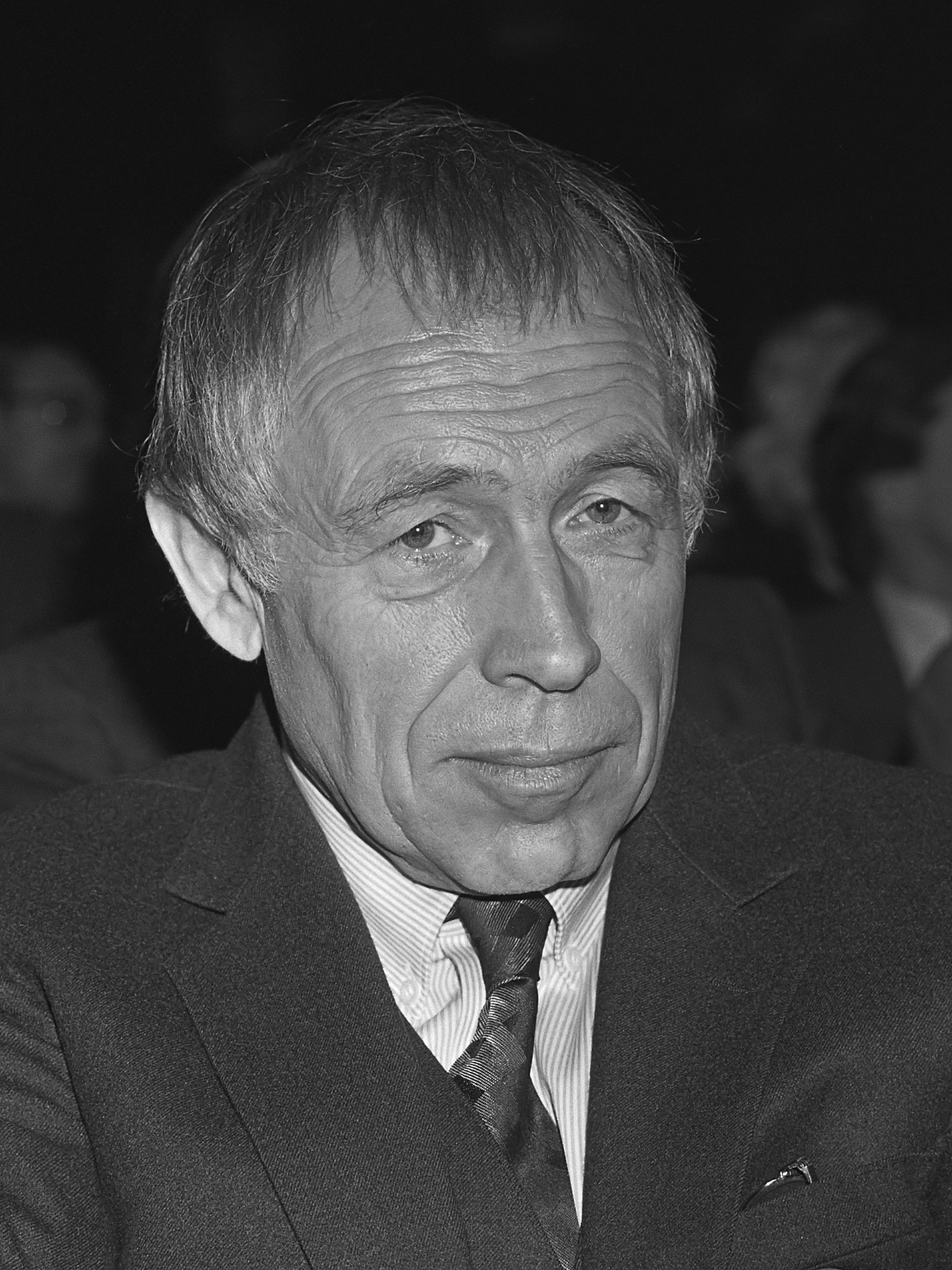
- Geißler in 1986

Minister for Youth, Family and Health
- In office 4 October 1982 – 26 September 1985
- Chancellor: Helmut Kohl
- Preceded by: Anke Fuchs
- Succeeded by: Rita Süssmuth

Minister for Social Affairs, Health and Sports of Rhineland-Palatinate
- In office 18 May 1967 – 23 June 1977
- Minister-President: Peter Altmeier; Helmut Kohl; Bernhard Vogel
- Preceded by: Office established
- Succeeded by: Georg Gölter

General Secretary of the Christian Democratic Union
- In office 7 March 1977 – 11 September 1989
- Leader: Helmut Kohl
- Preceded by: Kurt Biedenkopf
- Succeeded by: Volker Rühe
Parliamentary constituencies
Member of the Bundestag
In office 4 November 1980 – 17 October 2002
Preceded by	Albert Leicht
Succeeded by	Ralf Göbel
Constituency	Landau (1980–1987); Südpfalz (1987–2002)
In office 19 October 1965 – 11 October 1967
Preceded by	Gustav-Adolf Gedat
Succeeded by	Kurt Härzschel
Constituency	Reutlingen
Member of the; Landtag of Rhineland-Palatinate
In office 21 March 1971 – 18 March 1979
Constituency	Wahlkreis 4 (1971–1975); Wahlkreis 3 (1975–1977)

Personal details
- Born: Heinrichjosef Geißler; 3 March 1930 Oberndorf am Neckar, Germany
- Died: 12 September 2017 (aged 87) Gleisweiler, Germany
- Party: Christian Democratic Union
- Children: 3, including Dominik
- Education: Heidelberg University

Heinrich "Heiner" Geißler (3 March 1930 – 12 September 2017) was a German politician and judge who served as the Federal Minister for Youth, Family and Health from 1982 to 1985. A member of the Christian Democratic Union of Germany (CDU), he served as the party's general secretary from 1977 to 1989.

Geißler served as a government minister in the state of Rhineland-Palatinate under the minister presidents Peter Altmeier, Helmut Kohl and Bernhard Vogel before becoming general secretary of the CDU. During his tenure, he served as federal minister and attempted to overthrow Kohl, then the party chairman, at the 1989 CDU party congress in Bremen, but failed and thereafter lost his position within the party.

Both during his tenure and after, he took on increasingly left-leaning positions in economic questions and questions of women's emancipation, and eventually joined the activist organisation ATTAC, which is critical of globalisation. Later in life, he served as a mediator in employer-employee disputes, as well as a mediator in the conflict surrounding the Stuttgart 21 railway.

== Early life ==
Geißler was born on 3 March 1930 in Oberndorf am Neckar as the fourth of five children of civil servant Heinrich Geißler and his wife Maria, née Buck. His father was a member of the Centre Party and did not adopt Nazi ideology, as a result of which he was subjected to several disciplinary measures and moved to Tuttlingen (between 1938 and 1940) and eventually to Spaichingen, where the Geißler family experienced the war's end. Toward the end of World War II, Heiner Geißler was drafted to the Wehrmacht, from which he fled together with a school friend. Afterwards, he attended schools in Ravensburg, Tuttlingen, Hannover, and Spaichingen, after which he entered into the private, Jesuit-run Kolleg St. Blasien, since there was no school in Spaichingen that led to the Abitur. After attaining the Abitur in 1949, he entered the Jesuit order as a novice, leaving four years later, just before he had to take the monastic vows (the evangelical counsels), which stipulated poverty, chastity and obedience. He later commented: "At 23 I noticed, that I cannot uphold two – so at least one – of these vows. It was not poverty."

After leaving the order, Geißler went on to study philosophy at the Jesuit-run Munich School of Philosophy, and afterwards law at the Ludwig-Maximilians-Universität München and the University of Tübingen. While a student in Tübingen, he became a member of the KStV Alamannia Tübingen, a fraternity belonging to the Kartellverband. He finished his legal studies in 1957 with the first state examination, followed by becoming a juris doctor in July 1960 and the second state examination in 1962. In 1962, he briefly worked as a judge at the Amtsgericht in Stuttgart, followed by employment as a civil servant in the office of the Minister for Labour and Social Affairs in Baden-Württemberg, Josef Schüttler, from 1962 to 1965.

== Career ==
=== Party offices ===
Geißler was a life-long member of the Christian Democratic Union of Germany. Together with Franz Sauter, Erwin Teufel, and Josef Rebhan, Geißler founded the Rottweil district group of the Young Union (JU), the CDU's youth wing. He was JU chairman of Baden-Württemberg from 1961 to 1965. In 1977, he succeeded Kurt Biedenkopf as general secretary of the federal CDU. As such, he managed the party in three federal elections (1980, 1983, and 1987). To this day, he is the longest-serving general secretary of the CDU and the only one to concurrently serve as a government minister. During this period, he was responsible for the new basic program of the party and was decisively involved in formulating the CDU's new positions in foreign policy, which were developed on the youth party congress in Hamburg and were considered a precondition for the coalition with the Free Democratic Party (FDP) that later became a reality. Geißler was also responsible for the modernisation of the party's position on women's rights, put forth at the 1985 CDU party congress in Essen.

When, during the Flick affair, party chairman Helmut Kohl was questioned as to whether he had accepted bribes for the CDU, Geißler defended him in a 1986 television show by proposing that Kohl may have had a "blackout". After that point, relations between both soured. After reports appeared that Geißler was to be replaced after the CDU lost elections in West Berlin and Frankfurt am Main in 1989, and achieved only 37.6% of the vote in the European election of that year, a drop of 8.2% from the 1984 European election, Geißler was not re-nominated for the position of general secretary by chairman Kohl. Previously, differences on policy had created a rift between chairman and general secretary. Together with Lothar Späth and Rita Süssmuth, Geißler attempted to overthrow Kohl on the 1989 CDU party congress held in Bremen, but was unsuccessful, leading to his resignation as general secretary. Until 1998, he belonged to the party presidium and, until 2002, to the federal board.

Geißler remained critical of Kohl following his loss of power. In 1995, he called the party, referring to Kohl's role, as a "party with a cult of personality" ("führerkultische Partei"). At the 1990 CDU party congress, he apologised for using the word Führerkult, stating: "The term was wrong, the issue remains." During the CDU donations scandal, he admitted to slush funds being upkept during Kohl's tenure as chairman.

He attracted considerable controversy in 1977 after publishing a brochure which accused several leftist and liberal artists and politicians in West Germany of being "sympathisers of terror", referring to the attacks of the Red Army Faction (RAF). Mentioned in the pamphlet were, among others, Helmut Gollwitzer, Heinrich Albertz, Günter Wallraff, Herbert Marcuse, and Federal Minister for the Interior Werner Maihofer. In 1983, Geißler called the Social Democratic Party (SPD) a "fifth column of the other side", referring to the Eastern Bloc, during the debate concerning the stationing of American MGM-31 Pershing missiles in Europe. During the electoral campaign for the 1983 federal election, Geißler also attracted controversy by calling the pension policy of the SPD the "pension lie", elaborating: "He who does not know the truth is merely an idiot, but he who knows it and calls it a lie, is a criminal!", originating in Bertolt Brecht's play Life of Galileo. In 1985, after several mayors of cities bombed by the Luftwaffe were invited by the SPD to Nuremberg under the slogan "Never again war from German soil!", Geißler rhetorically asked why the Social Democrats had also invited the mayors of Dresden and Leipzig (both then part of communist East Germany) and cited the slogan of Kurt Schumacher "Never another dictatorship on German soil!", contrasting it with the SPD slogan. Due to Geißler's persistent attacks against the SPD, then-chairman Willy Brandt accused him of being "the worst demagogue in this country since Goebbels".

=== Bundestag deputy ===
Geißler first entered the Bundestag following the 1965 federal election as a directly elected candidate for the electoral district of Reutlingen. From 1971 to 1979, he belonged to the Landtag of Rhineland-Palatinate. From 1980 to 2002, he again served as deputy, this time as a directly elected deputy for the electoral district of Südpfalz. Following the first German election after reunification in 1990, he served as deputy chairman of the CDU/CSU parliamentary group, from January 1991 to October 1998.

During a debate in the Bundestag concerning the NATO Double-Track Decision and the stationing of Pershing II missiles by the United States of America in European countries, Geißler responded to a Der Spiegel interview given by the deputies Otto Schily and Joschka Fischer (both Greens), in which they had compared the potential nuclear war following the stationing of the missiles with the Holocaust, stating:

[...] putting the mass extermination at Auschwitz mentally in connection with the defence of our free and democratic state by means of nuclear deterrent belongs to the chapter of confusion of terms and mentalities which we now have to suffer through. Mr. Fischer, I will answer to this, which you have stated there [in the article], by drawing your attention to the following: The pacifism of the 1930s, which in its philosophical foundations did not differ much from today's pacifism, what we acknowledge to be the foundations of pacifism today, this pacifism of the 1930s made Auschwitz possible.

While this statement was defended by advocates of the missile's stationing, several deputies accused Geißler of spreading revisionist narratives. The left-liberal FDP deputy Hildegard Hamm-Brücher asked in this context: "What did pacifism have to do with antisemitism in Germany?" He himself later stated in an interview with the NDR that he was referring to pacifist movements in France and the United Kingdom, whose policy of Appeasement had encouraged Hitler to "attack other countries and to carry out his racist policies until they became mass murder".

=== State and federal minister ===
On 18 May 1967, Geißler entered the cabinet of Peter Altmeier, then minister-president of the state of Rhineland-Palatinate, as Minister for Social Affairs, which he kept after Helmut Kohl replaced Altmeier in 1969. He retained the position, renamed to Minister for Social Affairs, Health and Sports, under Kohl's successor Bernhard Vogel until 23 June 1977. During his tenure, he introduced the first kindergarten law in the history of West Germany. He also was the first to introduce a general reform of hospitals and the first law to financially support physical exercise programs. He was also the intiator and founder of the first state-run nursing services and thus considered one of the founders of the German nursing infrastructure.

On the federal level, he served from 4 October 1982 to 26 September 1985 as Federal Minister for Youth, Family and Health in the Kohl I and Kohl II governments. He renewed the legislation on conscientious objection, increased parental financial assistance and parental leave, reformed the education of new physicians, and founded the Bundesstiftung Mutter und Kind. During his tenure, he decided against introducing a compulsory registration for anyone who had contracted the newly discovered acquired immunodeficiency syndrome (AIDS).

== Political activities after 1997 ==
=== Mediator in wage disputes ===
On several occasions, Geißler served as a mediator in wage disputes, mediating four times between 1997 and 2002 in the construction industry, during a wage dispute within the German Telekom in 2006, and (together with Kurt Biedenkopf) during the wage dispute between the Gewerkschaft Deutscher Lokomotivführer (GDL) and the Deutsche Bahn (DB).

=== Membership in anti-globalisation initiatives ===
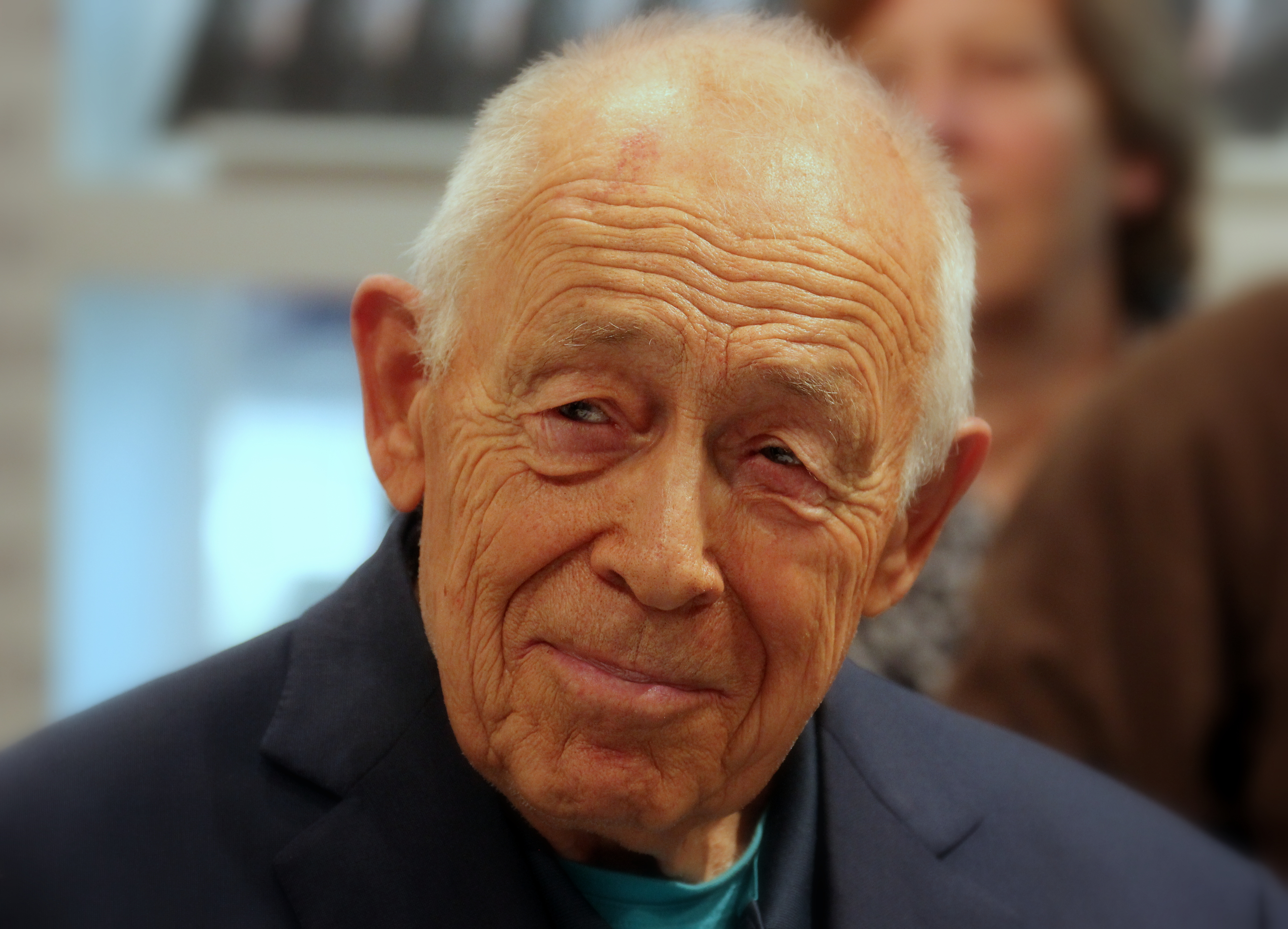
Geißler at the 2016 Frankfurt Book Fair

Later, Geißler took on increasingly left-wing positions in economic questions. He called opposing positions "ultra-conservative", "turbo-capitalist", "neoliberal", "backward", and "from yesterday". Based on this criticism, in May 2007, he announced his entry into the anti-globalisation organisation ATTAC, supporting the organisation's goal of humanising globalisation.

That same month, Geißler called an economic system, "in which hedge funds can work without oversight, in which so-called vulture funds can make huge profits at the expense of heavily indebted African countries, and in which the market capitalisation of a corporation increases relative to how many employees can be rationalised away", as "sick, immoral and economically wrong". Capitalism, he argued, was just as wrong as communism, since "beyond supply and demand, it knows no values". As a model for a new midway he suggested the "old German social market economy", but, since markets had already been globalised, he believed that nation states could not offer a solution to this issue. Instead, he argued, politics had to be internationalised. He argued that impulses for such had to come from regional actors, not from a national centralism, stating: "Only there, the feeling of Heimat can be emitted, only there people can feel at home". The European Union as a supranational actor had, according to Geißler, already lost faith by the population due to its exponential economic orientation.

Regarding the 33rd G8 summit in Heiligendamm in 2007, Geißler answered the question as to whether he would travel there and protest:

I do not want to surrender myself to anarchists and people who have gone insane, be it on one side or the other; and because I know myself: If someone touches me, I strike back, and be it a policeman, I strike back. When I demonstrate, I am exercising a fundamental right, and I will not let myself be touched -- by anyone. And I do not want to put myself in that situation.

Geißler was a member of the board of trustees of the Stiftung für Ökologie und Demokratie, which is closely linked to the Ecological Democratic Party (ÖDP).

=== Mediator in the conflict surrounding Stuttgart 21 ===
In 2010, minister-president Stefan Mappus of Baden-Württemberg called upon Geißler to mediate in the conflict surrounding the railway project Stuttgart 21 to bring advocates for and against the projects as well as experts to the negotiating table. Initially, the Greens had suggested him as mediator. In October and November, he moderated the public mediation meetings consisting of seven advocates and seven opponents of the project. With his decision on 30 November 2010 he advocated for the continuation of the project and demanded rectifications.

On 29 July 2011, he moderated the second and final round of mediation, during which the stress analysis presented for Stuttgart 21 in November 2010 was discussed. After both sides could initially not agree whether the new station could carry 30% more capacity as the already existing Stuttgart Hauptbahnhof, Geißler presented a compromise, which he had worked out together with a set of Swiss experts. Geißler's suggestion was welcomed by opponents of Stuttgart 21 and immediately rejected by the Deutsche Bahn, while the Ministry for Transportation of Baden-Württemberg promised to examine the compromise. The examination occurred in 2020.

After it was announced that the project's cost would rise to €1.1 billion, Geißler publicly voiced doubts about the project in December 2012.

In a public discussion titled "Five years later – The mediation of Stuttgart 21", Stuttgart 21 critic Klaus Arnoldi suggested to Geißler, that his demands were unrealistic and not a single one was implemented.

== Political positions ==
In 1988, Geißler was in favour of removing the aim of achieving German reunification from the CDU party program, and of acknowledging the post-war German-Polish border as permanent.

In 1975, Geißler coined the term of the "new social question" in regards to increased unemployment. Later, in 2004, he criticised the Hartz reforms as "in some respects, poorly designed". After the Federal Constitutional Court ruled on 9 February 2010 that social welfare benefits had to have a difference to wages of employees working full-time ("Lohnabstandsgebot"), he stated that "Hartz IV is destroying human dignity", and that the Lohnabstandsgebot is "a problem of an economy, which is obviously not capable or not willing to pay working people living wages". During the 1991 parliamentary vote to move the seat of federal government from Bonn to Berlin, the country's historic capital, Geißler proposed a two-city capital as a compromise.

During the NSA affair, Geißler advocated in favour of granting Edward Snowden asylum, stating: "Snowden has done a great service to the Western world. It is now up to us to help him."

Geißler supported the initiative "artikeldrei" by the LSVD+, which advocated for an extension of Article 3 of the Basic Law of Germany to extend to homosexuals. He was critical of the Roman Catholic church and stated, regarding his Christian faith: "I am firstly a democrat. I try to be a Christian." As to the importance of his faith for his political activities, he stated:

When I say that I try to be a Christian, I primarily mean this in a political sense. Independently of the question as to whether God exists, the message of the gospel is so outstanding that I have attempted to orientate my entire political after it.

== Public perception ==
In the German public, Geißler became increasingly popular in older age. He was a welcome guest in talkshows. In 2005, he moderated a monthly show alongside Peter Glotz called Glotz & Geißler on n-tv. Especially during his tenure as mediator during the dispute surrounding Stuttgart 21, he was compared to the figure of Master Yoda from the Star Wars universe. Besides apparent physical similarities, he was said to have the same "aura of a sage".

== Personal life ==
Geißler was married and had three children, among them Dominik Geißler, who has served has mayor of Landau since 2023. Since 1980 he lived in Gleisweiler. He died on 11 September 2017, aged 87.

== Other activities ==
- Aktion Courage, Chairman (2002–2005)
- Barmenia Versicherungen, Member of the Advisory Board

== Publications ==
- Das Recht der Kriegsdienstverweigerung nach Art. 4 Abs. III des Grundgesetzes. Dissertation der Universität Tübingen 1960, online-Text, (PDF; 1,9 MB).
- Die neue soziale Frage. Analysen und Dokumente (= Herderbücherei. Die Gelbe Serie. Bd. 566). Herder, Freiburg (Breisgau) u. a. 1976, ISBN 3-451-07566-0.
- als Herausgeber: Abschied von der Männergesellschaft (= Ullstein-Buch. Ullstein-Sachbuch 34350). Mit dem dokumentarischen Anhang der „Leitsätze der CDU für eine neue Partnerschaft zwischen Mann und Frau". Ullstein, Frankfurt am Main u. a. 1986, ISBN 3-548-34350-3.
- Zugluft. Politik in stürmischer Zeit. Bertelsmann, München 1990, ISBN 3-570-09688-2.
- Heiner Geißler im Gespräch mit Gunter Hofmann und Werner A. Perger. Eichborn, Frankfurt am Main 1993, ISBN 3-8218-1163-3.
- Gefährlicher Sieg. Die Bundestagswahl 1994 und ihre Folgen. Kiepenheuer & Witsch, Köln 1995, ISBN 3-462-02416-7.
- Der Irrweg des Nationalismus. Beltz, Athenäum, Weinheim 1995, ISBN 3-89547-712-5.
- Hat der Sozialstaat noch Zukunft? 22 May 1996 im Schlosshotel Kronberg. Diskussion mit Heiner Geißler und Walter Kannengießer (= Mengler Kamingespräche. Bd. 18, ZDB-ID 2568768-2). Mengler, Darmstadt 1996.
- Bergsteigen (= dtv 20039 Kleine Philosophie der Passionen.). Deutscher Taschenbuch-Verlag, München 1997, ISBN 3-423-20039-1.
- Das nicht gehaltene Versprechen. Politik im Namen Gottes. Kiepenheuer und Witsch, Köln 1997, ISBN 3-462-02618-6.
- Zeit, das Visier zu öffnen. Kiepenheuer & Witsch, Köln 1998, ISBN 3-462-02749-2.
- "Wo ist Gott?" Gespräche mit der nächsten Generation. Rowohlt Berlin, Berlin 2000, ISBN 3-87134-410-9.
- Was ist deutsch? In: Elisabeth Schweeger, Eberhard Witt (Hrsg.): Ach Deutschland! Belville, München 2000, ISBN 3-933510-67-8, S. 11–17.
- Intoleranz. Vom Unglück unserer Zeit. Kiepenheuer & Witsch, Köln 2002, ISBN 3-462-03082-5.
- Was würde Jesus heute sagen? Die politische Botschaft des Evangeliums. Rowohlt Berlin, Berlin 2003, ISBN 3-87134-477-X.
- Glaube und Gerechtigkeit (= Ignatianische Impulse. Bd. 4). Echter, Würzburg 2004, ISBN 3-429-02603-2.
- Ou Topos. Suche nach dem Ort, den es geben müsste. Kiepenheuer & Witsch, Köln 2009, ISBN 978-3-462-03683-1.
- Leonardo Boff: Zukunft für Mutter Erde. Warum wir als Krönung der Schöpfung abdanken müssen. Mit einem Vorwort von Heiner Geißler. Claudius, München 2012, ISBN 978-3-532-62427-2.
- Sapere aude! Warum wir eine neue Aufklärung brauchen. (List Taschenbuch, Ullstein Buchverlage, Berlin; 1. Auflage August 2013, 2. Auflage 2013), ISBN 978-3-548-61168-6.
- Was müsste Luther heute sagen? Ullstein Verlag, Berlin 2015, ISBN 978-3-550-08045-6.
- Kann man noch Christ sein, wenn man an Gott zweifeln muss? Fragen zum Luther-Jahr. Ullstein, Berlin 2017, ISBN 978-3-550-05006-0.

Political offices
Preceded by Anke Fuchs	Federal Ministers for Youth, Family and Health; 1982–1985	Succeeded by Rita Süssmuth
