= List of Independent Social Democratic Party politicians =

A list of notable politicians of the defunct Independent Social Democratic Party of Germany:

== A ==
- Karl Aderhold
- Lore Agnes
- Marie Ahlers
- Martha Arendsee
- Karl Artelt
- Rosa Aschenbrenner
- Siegfried Aufhäuser
- Elise Augustat

== B ==
- Maria Backenecker
- Bernhard Bästlein
- Johannes R. Becher
- Eduard Bernstein
- Heinrich Böschen
- Rudolf Breitscheid
- Hermann Brill
- Hans Brodmerkel
- James Broh
- Albert Buchmann

== C ==
- Arthur Crispien

== D ==
- Franz Dahlem
- Ernst Däumig
- Wilhelm Dittmann

== E ==
- Hugo Eberlein
- Emil Eichhorn
- Kurt Eisner
- August Enderle

== F ==
- Alfred Faust
- Max Fechner
- Josef Felder
- Hermann Fleissner
- Wilhelm Florin
- Paul Franken
- Walter Freitag
- Philipp Fries

== G ==
- Herta Geffke
- Anna Geyer
- Ernst Goldenbaum
- Arthur Goldstein
- Hugo Gräf
- Gregor A. Gregorius
- Otto Grotewohl
- Karl Grünberg
- Anton Grylewicz
- Ketty Guttmann

== H ==
- Hugo Haase
- Georg Ulrich Handke
- Fritz Heckert
- Alfred Henke
- Carl Herz
- Rudolf Hilferding
- Max Hoelz
- Adolf Hofer
- Oskar Hoffmann
- Martin Hoop

== J ==
- Mathilde Jacob
- Hans Jendretzky

== K ==
- Karl Kautsky
- Luise Kautsky
- Hans Kippenberger
- Erich Knauf
- Bernard Koenen
- Wilhelm Koenen
- Olga Körner
- Karl Korsch
- Hedwig Krüger
- Marie Kunert
- Otto Kühne
- Franz Künstler

== L ==
- Fritz Lange
- Antonie Langendorf
- Georg Ledebour
- Rudolf Leonhard
- Willy Leow
- Paul Levi
- Eugen Leviné
- Alfred Levy
- Theodor Liebknecht
- Hermann Liebmann
- Richard Lipinski
- Kurt Löwenstein

== M ==
- Hans Marchwitza
- Herbert Marcuse

== N ==
- Ernst Niekisch
- Emmy Noether

== P ==
- Agnes Plum
- Lothar Popp

== R ==
- Siegfried Rädel
- Heinrich Rau
- Bernhard Reichenbach
- Minna Reichert
- Anna Reitler
- Hermann Remmele
- Karl Retzlaw
- Ernst Reuter
- Julius Rosemann
- Arthur Rosenberg
- Kurt Rosenfeld
- Katharina Roth

== S ==
- Willy Sachse
- Willi Sänger
- Werner Scholem
- Hermann Schubert
- Ernst Schwarz
- Max Sievers
- Max Silbermann
- Gustav Sobottka
- Fritz Soldmann
- Siegmund Sredzki
- Anna Stiegler
- Karl Wilhelm Stolle
- Heinrich Ströbel

== T ==
- Ernst Thälmann
- Ernst Torgler
- Kurt Tucholsky

== U ==
- Walter Ulbricht

== W ==
- Walter Weidauer
- Mathilde Wurm

== Z ==
- Clara Zetkin
- Anna Ziegler
- Luise Zietz
- Fritz Zubeil
