= Otto Graf (politician) =

German politician (1892–1971)

Member of the Bundestag; for Munich West
- In office 7 September 1949 – 6 October 1953
- Preceded by: Constituency established
- Succeeded by: Benno Graf

Member of the Landtag of Bavaria
- In office 1920–1924

Personal details
- Born: 8 March 1892 Munich, Germany
- Died: 1 September 1971 (aged 79) Munich, West Germany
- Party: Social Democratic (after 1921)
- Other political affiliations: Pan-German League (before 1919); KPD (1919–1921); USPD (1921)

Military service
- Allegiance: German Empire
- Years of service: 1914–1917
- Battles/wars: World War I
- Central institution membership: 1920–1921: Member, KPD Central Commission

Otto Graf (8 March 1892 – 1 September 1971) was a German politician of the Social Democratic Party (SPD) and member of the German Bundestag.

== Life ==
Born in Munich, Bavaria in 1892, Graf trained to be a teacher and served in the First World War. Previously a member of the Pan-German League, Graf joined the Communist Party of Germany (KPD) in 1919, serving on its Central Commission from 1920 until his expulsion from the party in 1921 for "national communism." After a brief period in the Independent Social Democratic Party of Germany (USPD), he joined the Social Democratic Party of Germany (SPD), to which he belonged for the rest of his life. He worked for the German Workers Educational Association from 1922 to 1929, then as a writer and journalist until 1933. During the Nazi era, he was imprisoned several times. In 1949 Graf became a member of the German Bundestag as a directly elected SPD candidate in the Munich West constituency, to which he belonged in the first legislative period.

== Literature ==
Herbst, Ludolf; Jahn, Bruno (2002). Vierhaus, Rudolf (ed.). Biographisches Handbuch der Mitglieder des Deutschen Bundestages. 1949–2002 [Biographical Handbook of the Members of the German Bundestag. 1949–2002] (in German). München: De Gruyter - De Gruyter Saur. p. 1715. ISBN 978-3-11-184511-1.
