= Hermann Liebmann =

German politician (1882–1935)

Interior Minister of Saxony
- In office 1923–1925
- Prime Minister: Erich Zeigner; Alfred Fellisch

Parliament Member of Saxony
- In office 1919–1933

City Council Member of Leipzig
- In office 1918–1923

Personal details
- Born: August 18, 1882 Paunsdorf, Saxony, Germany
- Died: September 6, 1935 Leipzig, Saxony, Germany
- Party: SPD (1905–1917) (1922–1935)
- Other political affiliations: USPD (1917–1922)
- Profession: Metal Worker; Newspaper Editor

Hermann Liebmann (August 18, 1882 – September 6, 1935) was a German politician from the Social Democratic Party (SPD). He died shortly after his release from a Nazi concentration camp as a result of abuse received while imprisoned.

== Early life (1882–1905) ==
Hermann Liebmann was born on August 18, 1882, in Paunsdorf (now part of Leipzig), Saxony, Germany. His father was a day laborer. Liebmann learned the trade of mold maker (German - former) and worked as a metalworker. He studied mold maker as an apprentice. He served in the military from 1903 to 1905. He worked as a metalworker until 1909.

== Leipzig politics (1905–1919) ==
After his two years of military service, Liebmann joined the SPD in 1905. Liebmann was always at the focal point of developments within the SPD in Leipzig. From 1909 to 1912, Liebmann was a reporter for the Leipziger Volkszeitung, a workers newspaper in Leipzig. Starting in 1913 Liebmann served as editor of the Leipziger Volkszeitung, a post which he had until 1933. The post had been previously held by Franz Mehring who followed the revolutionary teachings of Marx and Engels. Liebmann advocated a peaceful civil approach.

From 1914 to 1916 Liebmann served during World War I. He resigned in 1917 to protest the pro-war policies of the SPD. In 1917, along with a greater part of the Social Democratic Party, he joined in protest against the civil peace policy of the Berlin party executive of the SPD, the Independent Social Democratic Party of Germany (Unabhängige Sozialdemokratische Partei Deutschlands or USPD). On November 8, 1918, Liebmann became a member of the select committee of the Leipzig workers’ and soldiers’ council (Leipziger Arbeiter- und Soldatenrat).

In 1918, Liebmann became a city councilor (Stadtverordneter) in Leipzig. He served in this capacity until 1923. In 1919, as part of the city council, the street-cars, gas, water, electricity, the zoo, nurseries, and swimming pools came under the direction of the city. The housing authority also came under closer control of the city government. One of the projects Liebmann worked on was getting streetcar week passes for workers.

== Saxon State Politics (1919–1933) ==
From 1919 to 1933, Liebmann served as a member of the Parliament (Landstag) of Saxony. During this time he served twice as the temporary chairman of the SPD. During part of this time, he still served as a city councilman in Leipzig.

As a result of his disagreement with the party leadership, Liebmann was a member of the USPD from 1919 to 1922. During this time he served as secretary for the party in Saxony. In 1922, the SPD and USPD merged, and Liebmann returned to the SPD. This merger helped to make Liebmann one of the most popular left-wing representatives in Saxony. He stayed a member of the SPD until his death in 1935. From 1924 to 1926 Liebmann served as deputy chairman, from 1926 to 1929 as chairman, and from 1930 to 1933 assessor of the SPD parliamentary group.

On April 1, 1923, Liebmann became Saxon Interior Minister and Deputy Prime Minister under Erich Zeigner (SPD). From 31 October 1923 to 4 January 1924, he held this office under Alfred Fellisch.

In January 1930, Hermann Liebmann suggested a coalition of the SPD with moderate bourgeois forces to prevent the take over of Nazi fascism in Saxony. This statement provoked a heated debate within the SPD.

== Imprisonment and death (1933–1935) ==
In 1933, the SPD stood as the only party not wanting to abolish the Weimar Republic. The right wing was against Liebmann due to his action against non-democratic activities. Upon Hitler becoming Germany's Chancellor, the working party's future was uncertain. 25,000 protesters gathered in Leipzig. Hermann Liebmann addressed the crowd. This was the last time he appeared in public. In spite of the impending dictatorship, Liebmann led the SPD to 30.3% of the Leipzig vote for the March 5, 1933 parliamentary elections. This was higher than any other party.

In April 1933, Liebmann was arrested and put under protective custody in Dresden. He was then brought to the concentration camp in Hohnstein. As a socialist, he was viewed as an enemy to the state. His imprisonment was administered directly by Martin Mutschmann, the Nazi regional leader (Gauleiter) of Saxony. It was during this time that he was continually abused. On May 20, 1933, Mutschmann made Liebmann read his parliamentary speeches while being beaten and tortured. Other torture included putting inmates in a sewer so that they were covered with human feces. The conditions in Hohnstein were so bad that the State court in Dresden sentenced the camp leader and 24 guards to 6 years in prison in May 1935. Hitler pardoned the leader and guards.

In 1934, Liebmann was transferred to the Concentration camp at Colditz.

Hermann Liebmann was released after more than two years of imprisonment in May 1935. He had previously been of sound health. He left a broken man. He was seriously ill suffering from the effects of torture and heart disease. Liebmann died in Leipzig in September 1935. His death was announced in the Leipziger Volkszeitung, which at that time was published in Karlovy Vary (Karlsbad), Czechoslovakia and smuggled into Germany.

Liebmann is buried at the Sellerhausen Cemetery in Leipzig (Friedhof Leipzig – Sellerhausen).

== Tributes ==
- Liebmann Hermann High School in Leipzig (closed in 1992)
- Hermann Liebmann Bridge in Leipzig. It was dedicated on 29 June 2004 by Leipzig mayor Wolfgang Tiefensee.[2] The old bridge had to be demolished in 2002.
- Hermann Liebmann Strasse: a 1,283-meter-long street in Leipzig, running through the city districts of Neustadt-Neuschönefeld, Volkmarsdorf, and Schönefeld-Abtnaundorf. The street was formerly known as Hauptstraße (Neuschönefeld) and Kirchweg (Neustadt) until 1888, Kirchstraße from 1888 to 1933, Alfred-Kindler-Straße from 1933 to 1945.
- 20 January 2009: Hermann Liebmann and five other SPD deputies were honored in a picture gallery.

== See also ==
- Urgent Call for Unity
- List of Independent Social Democratic Party politicians
- List of Social Democratic Party of Germany members
