= Artur König =

German politician

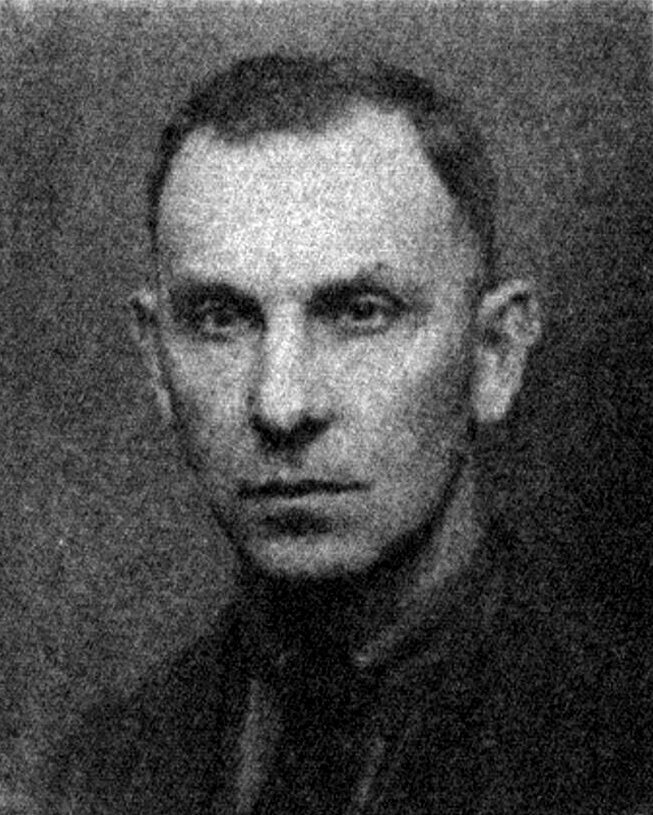
- König c. 1924

Member of the Reichstag for Düsseldorf East
- In office 27 May 1924 – 29 November 1925
- Preceded by: Multi-member district
- Succeeded by: Agnes Plum

Personal details
- Born: 18 April 1884 Breslau, Province of Silesia, Kingdom of Prussia, German Empire
- Died: c. 1945 Strausberg, Nazi Germany
- Party: SPD (1904–1919); KPD (after 1919)
- Other political affiliations: Spartacus League (1918)
- Occupation: Politician

Military service
- Allegiance: German Empire; Revolutionaries
- Branch/service: Imperial German Army; Ruhr Red Army
- Years of service: 1916–1918; 1920
- Battles/wars: First World War; Western Front; Ruhr uprising
- Central institution membership: 1923–1925: Full member, KPD Central Committee (Note: Zentrale until 1925); 1920–1921: Member, KPD Central Commission

Artur König (Note: Artur/Arthur König/Koenig's name is variously spelled in the different sources.) (18 April 1884 – c. 1945) was a German politician (KPD). He sat, briefly, as a Communist member of the Reichstag (national parliament) in 1924/25. He fell out with the party leadership after he was appointed party treasurer in 1924, and investments made with party funds turned sour. There was no evidence or lasting support for initial suggestions that König had enriched himself personally, but a significant amount of money was nevertheless lost and his influence within the fractious Communist Party was permanently diminished. During the twelve Nazi years he was involved in resistance but no details survive. It is thought that he died when he was shot, early in 1945, by Nazi paramilitaries, in Strausberg near Berlin.

== Life ==
Artur König was born in Breslau (as Wrocław was then known) into a family registered as "non-religious" (which in Germany confers certain tax advantages). After completing his mandatory schooling he worked in machine and paper factories, later also working in domestic service and as a newspaper courier. He was a dedicated autodidact, and after he had sufficiently enhanced his learning he became a book dealer.

From 1904 König engaged with the trades union movement. This was also the year in which he joined the Social Democratic Party ("Sozialdemokratische Partei Deutschlands" / SPD). At some point he had relocated to the industrially dynamic Ruhr region, where from 1912 he was employed in an SPD bookshop in Dortmund. The First World War broke out in July 1914: between 1916 and 1918 König served as a soldier on the Western Front. A couple of months before the war ended, however, in September 1918 he deserted from the army and joined the pacifist Spartacus League.

He participated, as a delegate from Dortmund, in the "founding congress" of the Communist Party which took place over three days in Berlin, starting on 31 December 1918. In 1920 he became party chairman for the Essen district and took a paid secretarial position with the party. During the abortive (and brief) Ruhr uprising which broke out in March 1920 he took a leading role in the Ruhr Red Army.

In December 1920 the party's sixth party conference took place and sealed a merger with the left wing majority of the disintegrating Independent Social Democratic Party ("Unabhängige Sozialdemokratische Partei Deutschlands" / USPD). This was also the conference at which König was first elected to the party's powerful Central Committee. In August 1921 the party conference took place in Jena and he was re-elected. In 1922 he became Secretary (i.e. regional group leader) in the party's administrative district ("Unterbezirk") of Dortmund. Further advancement within the party hierarchy followed, both at regional and at national levels.

The 1923 German October did not, as had been hoped, trigger a German version of the Russian October Revolution, but it did demonstrate the intensity of revolutionary aspirations within the Communist Party of Germany. As a representative of the party's left wing from the western part of Germany, in January 1924 König travelled to Moscow to take part in discussions with the leadership of the Communist International (Comintern) and to denounce Heinrich Brandler, a disgraced former leader of the German party who was now being blamed for the failure of the "Deutscher Oktober". At the Fifth World Congress of the Comintern, in June/July 1924, König was elected a member of the organisation's "International Control Commission".

Back in Germany, at the regional party conference for the Ruhr region in March 1924 König delivered the main speech on behalf of the party left wing. Then in April 1924, at the ninth party conference held in Frankfurt, he was elected national party treasurer ("Hauptkassierer"). Additionally, at the General Election of May 1924, and again at the General Election of December 1924, Artur König was elected to the Reichstag (national parliament), where he sat as a Communist Party member, representing the Düsseldorf electoral district ("Wahlkreis 22").

The Communist Party invested its funds in various factories and other businesses, selected to maximise financial returns. One of the companies in which the party had invested was even engaged in producing gramophone records, an investment which the party leadership would later deride as crazy, because it was obvious that the gramophone record industry would be destroyed by the rapidly emerging world of Radio broadcasting. There were naturally calls on party funds. During König 's time as party treasurer there were unplanned additional expenses in connection with the start-up costs for the party news-sheet "Sichel und Hammer" (which was relaunched in 1925 as the Arbeiter-Illustrierte-Zeitung ("Workers' Illustrated Newspaper"). In 1925 it emerged that ill-judged investment/spending decisions had led to a loss of party funds assessed, initially, at 100,000 Marks. The party's "business dealings" had previously been celebrated, and when information about the losses came out, wild rumours began to circulate within the party, hinting at wild parties and embezzlement. Still in 1925, Artur König was replaced as party treasurer and an enquiry was launched into what had happened.

The scandal attracted the attention of the Comintern which used it to try and discredit other party comrades who had fallen out of favour with the leadership, notably Werner Scholem and Ruth Fischer. In the aftermath of the affair König was also obliged to resign his parliamentary (Reichstag) seat in November 1925. The seat was taken on by his party comrade Agnes Plum. Nevertheless, although the middle 1920s were characterised by serious party ructions and many expulsions from the party, Artur König was not expelled from the party. The investigation evidently concluded very quickly that he had not enriched himself at the party's expense. His name continued to appear on party lists till the early 1930s. However, he never again held any important positions in the party structure.

After January 1933 political activity (except in support of the Nazi Party) became illegal, and many previously active communists were arrested and/or killed by the authorities. Others managed to flee abroad. Information on Artur König's final twelve years is sparse and based on hearsay. It is thought that he became involved in an underground antifascist resistance group in the Lusatia area. According to Robert Neddermeyer, a Reichstag and Communist Party contemporary who was also actively involved in antifascist resistance (and survived), Artur König died when he was shot, early in 1945, by Nazi paramilitaries, in Strausberg near Berlin.
