= List of members of the Central Commission of the Communist Party of Germany =

This list provides an alphabetically ordered overview of the members of the Zentralausschuss (literally "Central Commission") of the Communist Party of Germany (KPD) elected at the Party Congresses (1920–1923). It was abolished at the 10th Party Congress of the KPD in July 1925 in Berlin.

== 3rd Party Congress (February 1920) ==
The (illegally assembled) third Party Congress in Karlsruhe (25 – 26 February 1920) elected a Central Commission consisting of eleven members:

Members:

- Ernst Brandt
- Karl Forst
- Willi Langrock
- Paul Malachinski
- Hans Pfeiffer
- Jakob Schloer
- Hermann Schroers
- Karl Schulz
- Robert Siewert
- Hans Tittel
- Fritz Winguth

== 4th Party Congress (April 1920) ==
The (illegally assembled) fourth Party Congress in Berlin (14 – 15 April 1920) elected a Central Commission consisting of 20 members:

Members:

- Karl Baier
- Ernst Brandt
- Karl Forst
- "Garge"
- Johann Geier
- Otto Graf
- Ernst Graul
- Erna Halbe
- "Jakob"
- Karl Klein
- Willi Langrock
- Hans Pfeiffer
- "Rockow"
- "Schmidt"
- Friedrich Schnellbacher
- Jakob Schloer
- Robert Siewert
- Hans Tittel
- Fritz Winguth
- Karl Winkler

== 5th Party Congress (November 1920) ==
The delegates of the fifth Party Congress in Berlin (1 – 3 November 1920) elected a Central Commission consisting of 22 members:

Members:

- "Aschauer"
- Karl Baier
- Ernst Brandt
- Eugen Eppstein
- "Garge"
- Paul Gmeiner
- Karl Jannack
- Jakob Konieczny
- Bernhard Kühl
- Willi Langrock
- Georg Lechleiter
- Arthur Marks
- Valeska Meinig
- Josef Miller
- Edwin Morgner
- Ulrich Rogg
- Friedrich Schnellbacher
- Robert Siewert
- Hans Tittel
- Gustav Triebel
- Fritz Winguth
- "Wolf"

== 6th Party Congress (December 1920) ==
The sixth Party Congress in Berlin (4 – 7 December 1920) was the unification congress of the KPD and the left wing of the USPD. The delegates elected a Central Commission consisting of 39 members:

Members:

- Waldemar Behrs
- Max Bock
- Paul Böttcher
- Bruno Böttge
- Franz Dahlem
- Paul Franken
- Ernst Friesland (alias for Ernst Reuter)
- Otto Geithner
- Otto Graf
- Max Heydemann
- Alwin Hentschel
- Wilhelm Herzog
- Karl Jannack
- Walter Kaiser
- Leo Klinger
- Artur König
- Otto König
- Joseph Koering
- Hermann Krause
- Hedwig Krüger
- Herbert von Mayenburg
- Fritz Ohlhof
- Karl Poschmann
- Heinrich Rau
- Ulrich Rogg
- Friedrich Schnellbacher
- Robert Siewert
- Johann Skjellerup
- Konrad Sychalla
- Bruno Schramm
- Georg Schumann
- Josef Staimer
- Heinrich Teuber
- Ernst Thälmann
- Hans Tittel
- Hans Weber
- Paul Wegmann
- Hugo Werner
- Karl Winkelsässer

== 7th Party Congress (1921) ==
The seventh Party Congress in Jena (22 – 26 August 1921) elected a Central Commission consisting of 36 members:

Members:

- Heinrich Böschen
- Alfred Bochert
- Noah Borowski
- Karl Eckhardt
- Eugen Eppstein
- Ruth Fischer
- Paul Franken
- Otto Geithner
- Ottomar Geschke
- Theodor Gohr
- Martin Hoffmann
- Anton Jadasch
- Karl Jannack
- Leo Klinger
- Bernhard Kühl
- Arkadi Maslow
- Herbert von Mayenburg
- Peter Mieves
- Wilhelm Obendiek
- Jakob Ritter
- Willy Sachse
- Robert Siewert
- Konrad Sychalla
- Josef Staimer
- Max Strötzel
- Adolf Scholz
- Bruno Schramm
- Reinhold Schoenlank
- Georg Schumann
- Ernst Thälmann
- Hans Tittel
- Hugo Urbahns
- Willi Wallstab
- Hans Weber
- Ernst Wollweber
- Georg Zwilling

== 8th Party Congress (1923) ==
The delegates of the eighth Party Congress meeting in Leipzig (28 January – 1 February 1923) elected a Central Commission consisting of 38 members:

Members:

- Heinrich Alles
- "Mittelrhein"
- Heinrich Böschen
- Alfred Buhler
- Erich Czernecki
- Paul Dietrich
- Adam Ebner
- Karl Eckhardt
- Josef Eisenberger
- Eugen Eppstein
- Ruth Fischer
- Ottomar Geschke
- Karl Grönsfelder
- Kurt Grünthaler
- Gustav Haubold
- Erich Hausen
- Karl Jannack
- Bernard Koenen
- Arkadi Maslow
- Josef Miller
- Gustav Mößner
- Alfred Oelßner
- August Radtke
- Siegfried Rädel
- Jakob Ritter
- Willy Sachse
- Robert Siewert
- Albert Stolzenburg
- Carl Stucke
- Alois Schlichting
- Adolf Scholz
- Ernst Thälmann
- Albin Tenner
- Hugo Urbahns
- Willi Wallstab
- Hans Weber
- Ernst Wollweber
- Otto Zimmermann

== Sources ==
- Aoki, Kunihiko (September 2022). "戦前期ドイツ共産党（KPD）の変遷 －東独支配党 SED 指導部の背景－" [The Evolution of the Pre-war German Communist Party (KPD) —The Background of the Leadership of the GDR’s Ruling Party, the SED—] (PDF). Historical Studies of Socialist System (in Japanese) (30). The Japan Collegium for Historical Studies of Socialist System: 15–16. ISSN 2432-8774.
- Hermann Weber (Hrsg.): Der deutsche Kommunismus. Dokumente 1915–1945. 3. Auflage. Kiepenheuer & Witsch, Köln 1973, S. 425–434.
- Fowkes, Ben (1984). Communism in Germany Under the Weimar Republic (PDF). London: Macmillan Publishers.
