= Rosa Aschenbrenner =

German politician (1885–1967)

- Born: Rosa Lierl; 27 April 1885; Beilngries, Upper Bavaria, Germany
- Died: 9 February 1967 (aged 81); Munich, Bavaria, West Germany
- Occupations: Politician and activist
- Political party: SPD (1909-1917); USPD (1917-1920); VKPD (1920-1921); KPD (1920-1929); KPO (1929-1932); SPD (1930-1966)
- Spouse: Hans Aschenbrenner

Rosa Aschenbrenner (born Rosa Lierl: 27 April 1885 – 9 February 1967) was a German politician (KPD / SPD). After the Second World War, she became increasingly marginalised from the political mainstream because of her opposition to rearmament.

== Life ==
=== Provenance and early years ===
Rosa Aschenbrenner was born into a Roman Catholic family at Beilngries, a small town a short distance to the north of Ingolstadt in Upper Bavaria. She was the eldest of her parents' eight recorded children. Her father was a clock maker who also kept an agricultural smallholding. He was also chairman of the local Catholic Workers' Association, and Rosa Aschenbrenner grew up as a Roman Catholic, though by the end of her political career, slightly unusually for Bavaria in those times, she would be describing herself as "without religion" ("konfessionslos"). From 1898 she was in domestic service. In 1908 she joined the "Women's and girls' Education League" ("Frauen- und Mädchenbildungs-Verein") in Munich. She married Hans Aschenbrenner the next year and joined the Social Democratic Party (SPD) in 1908 or 1909.

She worked as a hairdresser between 1909 and 1914. During the next few years she took work as a seamstress with the army clothing supply department and in slaughter houses and stock yards. It was in 1914 that she joined the SPD "Women workers Committee" "Arbeiterinnenausschuss"). When First World War broke out in 1914, many in the SPD leadership came out in support for the government position, but in 1917 the party split, primarily over differences as to whether or not to continue supporting the war. Rosa Aschenbrenner chose the break-away party, which was launched that year as the Independent Social Democratic Party (Unabhängige Sozialdemokratische Partei Deutschlands / USPD). She quickly became a USPD left-wing activist.

=== Democratic politics ===
Aschenbrenner was briefly arrested in 1919. On 7 July 1920 she was elected deputy chair of the Munich district USPD leadership. She had already been selected and elected as a USPD member to the newly democratic Bavarian Regional Legislature ("Bayerischer Landtag") on 6 June 1920. During the course of the further re-alignment of left wing politics that followed the German Revolution of 1918–19 she participated at the "unification party conference" in December 1920 at which the larger part of the USPD united with the newly emerging Communist Party ("Kommunistische Partei Deutschlands" / KPD). Later, in 1921, attended the 6th Party Conference of the Communist Party at Jena. After 22 December 1920 Aschenbrenner is listed as a Landtag member not for the USPD, but for the Communist Party.

A member of the party's regional district leadership ("Bezirksleitung") for South Bavaria from 1921, she took responsibility for women's issues. After 1925, and till she left the regional party leadership team in 1929, she served as the regional party treasurer. In November 1921, however, she suffered a health crisis when she had to undergo a debilitating operation. She left the Landtag on 7 December 1921, formally resigning her mandate on 22 January 1922. She recovered and returned to the political fray, but for the next few years her focus switched to welfare and support work with the "Frauenhilfe für politische Gefangene" organisation which had been created during a period of political repression in the revolutionary aftermath of the war, as a left-wing vehicle for women to provide support to political prisoners. The organisation had been set up by the ADGB (Trades Union Confederation), but during 1923 it was dissolved, primarily because of the overlap between its residual activities and those of the Rote Hilfe Deutschland (RHD - Communist welfare organisation): from around 1925 Aschenbrenner, like others affected, switched her energies over to the RHD.

In 1924 there was another election to the Bavarian regional parliament. Aschenbrenner stood successfully as a candidate. This time she remained a member of the "Landtag" till 1932, though by that time she was no longer a member of the Communist Party.

In 1928 the German Communist Party embarked on a period of internal feuding. Aschenbrenner belonged to the pragmatic non-ideological wing of the party whose leaders included August Thalheimer and Heinrich Brandler. Aschenbrenner and members of her faction were particularly critical of the policies advanced by the party leadership under Ernst Thälmann, which followed the so-called social fascism and revolutionary union opposition strategies being mandated from Moscow. In 1928 she received a formal "warning" against deviations from the party line.

=== Party split ===
In June 1929 Rosa Aschenbrenner announced her resignation from the Communist Party, and went on to denounced as politically catastrophic the party line being pursued by the leadership. The Communist Party leadership, which valued discipline and loyalty, expelled her husband from the party in July, after he rejected their instruction to divorce his wife. Aschenbrenner now, on 11 June 1929, joined the Communist Party of Germany (Opposition) (Kommunistische Partei Deutschlands (Opposition) / KPO) which had been coalescing round Heinrich Brandler and August Thalheimer since the end of the previous year. This led to her being pilloried by the Communist press as a "political corpse" ("politischer Leichnam"). She remained in the KPO for less than a year, however. In the northern part of Bavaria the KPO had been able to set up a regional power base in Nuremberg, centred around Karl Grönsfelder, but in the south of Bavaria, the region surrounding Munich, the KPO never really established itself, and in May 1930 Rosa Aschenbrenner rejoined the centre-left Social Democratic Party (SPD)) from which she had broken away in 1917.

=== Nazi years ===
The Nazis took power in January 1933 and lost little time in converting the German state into a one-party dictatorship. Party political activity (unless in support of the Nazi party) became illegal. On 17 March 1933 Aschenbrenner was taken into "protective custody" ("Schutzhaft"). She was released after two or three months, but remained under police surveillance. She was arrested again in 1936 or 1937 for "Violation of the Treachery Law ("Verstoßes gegen das Heimtückegesetz"). Her crime had involved listening to forbidden foreign radio stations. On this occasion she was sentenced to a six-week or four-month jail term: sources differ on the duration of her second prison term, but there is agreement that she underwent two periods in jail between 1933 and 1945, covering several months. During the twelve Nazi years till 1945 Aschenbrenner supported herself with cleaning jobs.

=== After the war ended ===
The end of the war found Bavaria in the US occupation zone, which meant an end to one-party dictatorship and widespread consensus between occupiers and occupied on the need for a rapid return to democratic political systems and structures. Aschenbrenner was a founder member of the recreated SPD (party)). She was one of the 51 SPD members elected to the 180-person Bavarian Constitutional Assembly mandated to create a new constitution for Bavaria. During the later 1940s she may have returned briefly to sit in the Bavarian Regional Legislature ("Bayerischer Landtag"), but sources, strangely, are not consistent on this. In any event, twelve years under Hitler had opened the way for an increasingly consensual approach to politics. Aschenbrenner's own experiences had left her with an increasingly powerful commitment to pacifism, and by opposing the military rearmament that was being promoted by the United States, she found herself increasingly seen as a left-wing extremist and marginalised within the SPD. During the 1950s her political energies became concentrated on municipal politics, and she sat as an SPD city councillor in Munich till 1956. As a city councillor she sat on committees involved in reconstruction, social and civic matters, health and the Oktoberfest.

Rosa Aschenbrenner died at Munich on 9 February 1967.
