= Munich West/Centre (electoral district) =

Federal electoral district of Germany

219 Munich West/Centre
- Electoral district for the Bundestag
- Munich West/Centre in 2025
- State: Bavaria
- Population: 379,900 (2019)
- Electorate: 246,546 (2025)
- Major settlements: Munich (partial)
- Area: 90.7 km^{2}

Current electoral district
- Created: 1949
- Party: CSU
- Member: Stephan Pilsinger
- Elected: 2017, 2021, 2025

Munich West/Centre (German: München-West/Mitte) is an electoral constituency (German: Wahlkreis) represented in the Bundestag. It elects one member via first-past-the-post voting. Under the current constituency numbering system, it is designated as constituency 219. It is located in southern Bavaria, comprising the western and central part of the city of Munich.

Munich West/Centre was created for the inaugural 1949 federal election. Since 2017, it has been represented by Stephan Pilsinger of the Christian Social Union (CSU).

== Geography ==
Munich West/Centre is located in southern Bavaria. As of the 2021 federal election, it comprises the boroughs of Ludwigsvorstadt-Isarvorstadt (2), Schwanthalerhöhe (8), Neuhausen-Nymphenburg (9), Pasing-Obermenzing (21), Aubing-Lochhausen-Langwied (22), Allach-Untermenzing (23), and Laim (25) from the independent city of Munich.

== History ==
Munich West/Centre was created in 1949, then known as München-West. It acquired its current name in the 2002 election. In the 1949 election, it was Bavaria constituency 8 in the numbering system. In the 1953 through 1961 elections, it was number 203. In the 1965 through 1976 elections, it was number 208. In the 1980 through 1998 elections, it was number 207. In the 2002 and 2005 elections, it was number 222. In the 2009 and 2013 elections, it was number 221. In the 2017 and 2021 elections, it was number 220. From the 2025 election, it has been number 219.

Originally, the constituency comprised the boroughs of Allach, Aubing, Laim, Langwied, Lochhausen, Neuhausen, Nymphenburg, Obermenzing, Pasing, Schwanthalerhöhe, and Untermenzing. In the 1965 election, it lost the borough of Neuhausen. It acquired its current borders in the 2002 election.

Election	No.	Name	Borders
1949	8	München-West	Munich city (only Allach, Aubing, Laim, Langwied, Lochhausen, Neuhausen, Nymphenburg, Obermenzing, Pasing, Schwanthalerhöhe, and Untermenzing boroughs)
1953	203	München-West	Munich city (only Allach, Aubing, Laim, Langwied, Lochhausen, Neuhausen, Nymphenburg, Obermenzing, Pasing, Schwanthalerhöhe, and Untermenzing boroughs)
1957	203	München-West	Munich city (only Allach, Aubing, Laim, Langwied, Lochhausen, Neuhausen, Nymphenburg, Obermenzing, Pasing, Schwanthalerhöhe, and Untermenzing boroughs)
1961	203	München-West	Munich city (only Allach, Aubing, Laim, Langwied, Lochhausen, Neuhausen, Nymphenburg, Obermenzing, Pasing, Schwanthalerhöhe, and Untermenzing boroughs)
1965	208	München-West	Munich city (only Allach, Aubing, Laim, Langwied, Lochhausen, Nymphenburg, Obermenzing, Pasing, Schwanthalerhöhe, and Untermenzing boroughs)
1969	208	München-West	Munich city (only Allach, Aubing, Laim, Langwied, Lochhausen, Nymphenburg, Obermenzing, Pasing, Schwanthalerhöhe, and Untermenzing boroughs)
1972	208	München-West	Munich city (only Allach, Aubing, Laim, Langwied, Lochhausen, Nymphenburg, Obermenzing, Pasing, Schwanthalerhöhe, and Untermenzing boroughs)
1976	208	München-West	Munich city (only Allach, Aubing, Laim, Langwied, Lochhausen, Nymphenburg, Obermenzing, Pasing, Schwanthalerhöhe, and Untermenzing boroughs)
1980	207	München-West	Munich city (only Allach, Aubing, Laim, Langwied, Lochhausen, Nymphenburg, Obermenzing, Pasing, Schwanthalerhöhe, and Untermenzing boroughs)
1983	207	München-West	Munich city (only Allach, Aubing, Laim, Langwied, Lochhausen, Nymphenburg, Obermenzing, Pasing, Schwanthalerhöhe, and Untermenzing boroughs)
1987	207	München-West	Munich city (only Allach, Aubing, Laim, Langwied, Lochhausen, Nymphenburg, Obermenzing, Pasing, Schwanthalerhöhe, and Untermenzing boroughs)
1990	207	München-West	Munich city (only Allach, Aubing, Laim, Langwied, Lochhausen, Nymphenburg, Obermenzing, Pasing, Schwanthalerhöhe, and Untermenzing boroughs)
1994	207	München-West	Munich city (only Allach, Aubing, Laim, Langwied, Lochhausen, Nymphenburg, Obermenzing, Pasing, Schwanthalerhöhe, and Untermenzing boroughs)
1998	207	München-West	Munich city (only Allach, Aubing, Laim, Langwied, Lochhausen, Nymphenburg, Obermenzing, Pasing, Schwanthalerhöhe, and Untermenzing boroughs)
2002	222	München-West/Mitte	Munich city (only Ludwigsvorstadt-Isarvorstadt (2), Schwanthalerhöhe (8), Neuhausen-Nymphenburg (9), Pasing-Obermenzing (21), Aubing-Lochhausen-Langwied (22), Allach-Untermenzing (23), and Laim (25) boroughs)
2005	222	München-West/Mitte	Munich city (only Ludwigsvorstadt-Isarvorstadt (2), Schwanthalerhöhe (8), Neuhausen-Nymphenburg (9), Pasing-Obermenzing (21), Aubing-Lochhausen-Langwied (22), Allach-Untermenzing (23), and Laim (25) boroughs)
2009	221	München-West/Mitte	Munich city (only Ludwigsvorstadt-Isarvorstadt (2), Schwanthalerhöhe (8), Neuhausen-Nymphenburg (9), Pasing-Obermenzing (21), Aubing-Lochhausen-Langwied (22), Allach-Untermenzing (23), and Laim (25) boroughs)
2013	221	München-West/Mitte	Munich city (only Ludwigsvorstadt-Isarvorstadt (2), Schwanthalerhöhe (8), Neuhausen-Nymphenburg (9), Pasing-Obermenzing (21), Aubing-Lochhausen-Langwied (22), Allach-Untermenzing (23), and Laim (25) boroughs)
2017	220	München-West/Mitte	Munich city (only Ludwigsvorstadt-Isarvorstadt (2), Schwanthalerhöhe (8), Neuhausen-Nymphenburg (9), Pasing-Obermenzing (21), Aubing-Lochhausen-Langwied (22), Allach-Untermenzing (23), and Laim (25) boroughs)
2021	220	München-West/Mitte	Munich city (only Ludwigsvorstadt-Isarvorstadt (2), Schwanthalerhöhe (8), Neuhausen-Nymphenburg (9), Pasing-Obermenzing (21), Aubing-Lochhausen-Langwied (22), Allach-Untermenzing (23), and Laim (25) boroughs)
2025	219	München-West/Mitte	Munich city (only Ludwigsvorstadt-Isarvorstadt (2), Schwanthalerhöhe (8), Neuhausen-Nymphenburg (9), Pasing-Obermenzing (21), Aubing-Lochhausen-Langwied (22), Allach-Untermenzing (23), and Laim (25) boroughs)

== Members ==
The constituency was first represented by Otto Graf of the Social Democratic Party (SPD) from 1949 to 1953. Benno Graf of the Christian Social Union (CSU) was elected in 1953 and served one term. Anton Besold of the CSU then served from 1957 to 1965. Erwin Folger of the SPD won the constituency in 1965 and served until 1972. He was succeeded by fellow SPD member Manfred Marschall from 1972 to 1976. Peter Schmidhuber won the constituency for the CSU in 1976 and served one term. He was succeeded by fellow CSU member Kurt Faltlhauser, who was representative from 1980 to 1998. Hans-Peter Uhl CSU then served from 1998 to 2017. Stephan Pilsinger of the CSU was elected in 2017 and re-elected in 2021 and 2025.

Election	Member	Party	%
1949	Otto Graf	SPD	27.1
1953	Benno Graf	CSU	47.3
1957	Anton Besold	CSU	47.1
1961	Anton Besold	CSU	43.1
1965	Erwin Folger	SPD	43.9
1969	Erwin Folger	SPD	48.9
1972	Manfred Marschall	SPD	48.8
1976	Peter Schmidhuber	CSU	50.1
1980	Kurt Faltlhauser	CSU	47.4
1983	Kurt Faltlhauser	CSU	50.7
1987	Kurt Faltlhauser	CSU	48.7
1990	Kurt Faltlhauser	CSU	44.3
1994	Kurt Faltlhauser	CSU	49.8
1998	Hans-Peter Uhl	CSU	47.3
2002	Hans-Peter Uhl	CSU	44.3
2005	Hans-Peter Uhl	CSU	42.7
2009	Hans-Peter Uhl	CSU	36.8
2013	Hans-Peter Uhl	CSU	42.6
2017	Stephan Pilsinger	CSU	33.4
2021	Stephan Pilsinger	CSU	27.0
2025	Stephan Pilsinger	CSU	34.7

== Election results ==
=== 2025 election ===
Federal election (2025): Munich West/Centre
Notes:	Blue background denotes the winner of the electorate vote. Pink background denotes a candidate elected from their party list. Yellow background denotes an electorate win by a list member, or other incumbent. A ✓ or ✗ denotes status of any incumbent, win or lose respectively.						
Party	Candidate	Votes	%	±%	Party votes	%	±%
CSU	✓ Stephan Pilsinger	72,171	34.7	▲7.7	60,481	28.8	▲5.7
Greens	Dieter Gerald Janecek	60,196	28.9	▲2.0	52,687	25.1	▼2.4
SPD	Seija Anne Knorr-Köning	32,990	15.9	▼4.0	32,280	15.3	▼3.6
AfD					18,815	8.9	▲4.7
Left	Nicole Stephanie Gohlke	12,671	6.1	▲2.6	18,658	8.9	▲4.7
FDP	Dr. Lukas Otto Köhler	10,324	5.0	▼4.7	12,529	6.0	▼7.4
BSW					6,101	2.9	
FW	Richard Oliver Panzer	6,361	3.1	▲0.5	2,459	1.2	▼1.4
Volt	Alexandra Lang	4,395	2.1	▲1.0	2,529	1.2	▲0.4
APT	Fabian Gimmler	3,687	1.8	▲0.2	1,233	0.6	▼0.3
PARTEI	Philipp Johannes Drabinski	2,248	1.1	▲0.2	859	0.4	▼0.3
BD	Sebastian Köhne	1,671	0.8		165	0.1	
ÖDP					744	0.4	▼0.3
Independent	Benjamin Alexander Treppe	654	0.3				
Independent	Leonie Tabea Johanna Lieb	648	0.3				
dieBasis					406	0.2	▼1.2
Humanists					171	0.1	Steady
BP					161	0.1	▼0.1
MLPD					45	0.0	Steady
Informal votes		2,754			447		
Total valid votes		208,016			210,323		
Turnout		210,770	85.5	▲3.6			
CSU hold	Majority	11,975	5.8	▲5.7			

=== 2021 election ===
Federal election (2021): Munich West/Centre
Notes:	Blue background denotes the winner of the electorate vote. Pink background denotes a candidate elected from their party list. Yellow background denotes an electorate win by a list member, or other incumbent. A ✓ or ✗ denotes status of any incumbent, win or lose respectively.						
Party	Candidate	Votes	%	±%	Party votes	%	±%
CSU	✓ Stephan Pilsinger	53,311	27.0	▼6.3	45,540	23.0	▼6.7
Greens	Dieter Janecek	53,174	26.9	▲10.6	54,303	27.5	▲9.0
SPD	Seija Knorr-Köning	39,182	19.9	▼3.2	37,513	19.0	▲3.1
FDP	Lukas Köhler	19,153	9.7	▲0.7	26,401	13.4	▼0.3
AfD	Paul Podolay	7,594	3.8	▼2.8	8,403	4.3	▼3.5
Left	Nicole Gohlke	6,975	3.5	▼3.5	8,219	4.2	▼4.5
FW	Andreas Staufenbiel	5,058	2.6	▲0.8	5,036	2.5	▲1.5
Tierschutzpartei	Susanne Wittmann	3,096	1.6		1,796	0.9	▲0.1
dieBasis	Claudia Roedel	3,059	1.6		2,655	1.3	
Volt	Sophie Griesbacher	2,144	1.1		1,571	0.8	
PARTEI	Philipp Drabinski	1,804	0.9		1,403	0.7	▼0.2
ÖDP	Ben-Said Sharif Samani	1,557	0.8	▼0.8	1,353	0.7	▼0.2
Team Todenhöfer					1,161	0.6	
Pirates					614	0.3	▼0.1
BP					394	0.2	▼0.4
du.	Pia Chojnacki	391	0.2		187	0.1	
V-Partei3	Angelika Selbmann	365	0.2		234	0.1	▼0.1
Independent	Önder-Vedat Dönmez	316	0.2				
Humanists					196	0.1	
Unabhängige					180	0.1	
Gesundheitsforschung					158	0.1	0.0
Bündnis C					83	0.0	
BüSo	Werner Zuse	72	0.0	▼0.1			
Independent	Oskar Sommerfeldt	66	0.0				
DKP					52	0.0	0.0
LKR					52	0.0	
NPD					46	0.0	▼0.1
The III. Path					41	0.0	
MLPD					34	0.0	0.0
Informal votes		955			647		
Total valid votes		197,317			197,625		
Turnout		198,272	81.8	▲1.7			
CSU hold	Majority	137	0.1	▼10.1			

=== 2017 election ===
Federal election (2017): Munich West/Centre
Notes:	Blue background denotes the winner of the electorate vote. Pink background denotes a candidate elected from their party list. Yellow background denotes an electorate win by a list member, or other incumbent. A ✓ or ✗ denotes status of any incumbent, win or lose respectively.						
Party	Candidate	Votes	%	±%	Party votes	%	±%
CSU	Stephan Pilsinger	64,014	33.3	▼9.2	57,322	29.8	▼7.2
SPD	Bernhard Goodwin	44,283	23.1	▼5.5	30,617	15.9	▼7.8
Greens	Dieter Janecek	31,385	16.3	▲3.2	35,605	18.5	▲2.9
FDP	Lukas Köhler	17,369	9.0	▲5.0	26,356	13.7	▲6.3
Left	Dominik Lehmann	13,569	7.1	▲2.9	16,638	8.6	▲3.8
AfD	Bernhard Zimniok	12,852	6.7		14,895	7.7	▲3.6
FW	Ludwig Gebhard	3,450	1.8	▼0.3	1,956	1.0	▼0.4
PARTEI					1,823	0.9	
ÖDP	Andreas Klauke	3,033	1.6	0.0	1,650	0.9	▼0.2
Tierschutzpartei					1,560	0.8	▲0.1
BP	Norbert Seidl	1,690	0.9		1,073	0.6	0.0
Pirates					797	0.4	▼2.1
DiB					728	0.4	
BGE					417	0.2	
V-Partei³					388	0.2	
DM					266	0.1	
Gesundheitsforschung					179	0.1	
NPD					170	0.1	▼0.3
BüSo	Werner Zuse	225	0.1	0.0	71	0.0	0.0
Independent	Robert Mertel	207	0.1				
DKP					58	0.0	
MLPD					52	0.0	0.0
Informal votes		1,322			778		
Total valid votes		192,077			192,621		
Turnout		193,399	80.2	▲7.4			
CSU hold	Majority	19,731	10.2	▼3.8			

=== 2013 election ===
Federal election (2013): Munich West/Centre
Notes:	Blue background denotes the winner of the electorate vote. Pink background denotes a candidate elected from their party list. Yellow background denotes an electorate win by a list member, or other incumbent. A ✓ or ✗ denotes status of any incumbent, win or lose respectively.						
Party	Candidate	Votes	%	±%	Party votes	%	±%
CSU	✓ Hans-Peter Uhl	73,661	42.6	▲5.8	64,221	37.0	▲5.7
SPD	Roland Fischer	49,419	28.6	▲1.1	41,108	23.7	▲4.9
Greens	Dieter Janecek	22,743	13.1	▼1.4	27,068	15.6	▼3.8
Left	Nicole Fritsche	7,135	4.1	▼1.5	8,312	4.8	▼1.9
FDP	Daniel Volk	6,984	4.0	▼7.9	12,850	7.4	▼9.7
AfD					7,249	4.2	
Pirates	Ronald Heinrich	4,420	2.6		4,313	2.5	▲0.1
FW	Reinhold Herbert	3,713	2.1		2,387	1.4	
ÖDP	Mechthild von Walter	2,796	1.6	▲0.1	1,770	1.0	▲0.1
Tierschutzpartei					1,219	0.7	▲0.1
BP					1,002	0.6	0.0
NPD	Björn-Christopher Balbin	996	0.6	▼0.2	643	0.4	▼0.2
DIE FRAUEN					291	0.2	
REP					272	0.2	▼0.1
DIE VIOLETTEN					249	0.1	▼0.1
PRO	Stefan Werner	735	0.4		201	0.1	
Independent	Mertel	232	0.1				
Party of Reason					142	0.1	
MLPD					125	0.1	▲0.1
BüSo	Werner Zuse	185	0.1	▼0.1	60	0.0	0.0
RRP					51	0.0	▼0.6
Informal votes		1,303			789		
Total valid votes		173,019			173,533		
Turnout		174,322	72.7	▼2.0			
CSU hold	Majority	24,242	14.0	▲4.7			

=== 2009 election ===
Federal election (2009): Munich West/Centre
Notes:	Blue background denotes the winner of the electorate vote. Pink background denotes a candidate elected from their party list. Yellow background denotes an electorate win by a list member, or other incumbent. A ✓ or ✗ denotes status of any incumbent, win or lose respectively.						
Party	Candidate	Votes	%	±%	Party votes	%	±%
CSU	✓ Hans-Peter Uhl	63,075	36.8	▼5.9	53,814	31.3	▼5.3
SPD	Roland Fischer	47,101	27.5	▼11.8	32,308	18.8	▼9.7
Greens	Hermann Brem	24,967	14.6	▲6.7	33,340	19.4	▲3.1
FDP	Daniel Volk	20,442	11.9	▲7.1	29,355	17.1	▲5.2
Left	Henning Hintze	9,665	5.6	▲2.8	11,587	6.7	▲2.8
Pirates					4,045	2.4	
ÖDP	Mechthild von Walter	2,623	1.5		1,550	0.9	
Tierschutzpartei					1,120	0.7	
RRP					1,069	0.6	
NPD	Patrick Bernstein	1,413	0.8	▼0.1	1,029	0.6	▼0.1
Independent	Thomas Blechschmidt	979	0.6				
BP					929	0.5	▲0.2
Independent	Peter Landauer	652	0.4				
FAMILIE					528	0.3	▼0.2
REP					498	0.3	▼0.1
DIE VIOLETTEN					361	0.2	
PBC					160	0.1	0.0
BüSo	Werner Zuse	412	0.2	0.0	140	0.1	0.0
Independent	Robert Mertel	248	0.1				
CM					117	0.1	
DVU					69	0.0	
MLPD					33	0.0	0.0
Informal votes		1,561			1,086		
Total valid votes		171,577			172,052		
Turnout		173,138	74.7	▼2.9			
CSU hold	Majority	15,974	9.3	▲5.9			

=== 2005 election ===
Federal election (2005):Munich West/Centre
Notes:	Blue background denotes the winner of the electorate vote. Pink background denotes a candidate elected from their party list. Yellow background denotes an electorate win by a list member, or other incumbent. A ✓ or ✗ denotes status of any incumbent, win or lose respectively.						
Party	Candidate	Votes	%	±%	Party votes	%	±%
CSU	✓ Hans-Peter Uhl	71,321	42.7	▼1.6	61,266	36.6	▼7.0
SPD	Stephanie Jung	65,603	39.3	▼1.7	47,653	28.5	▼0.8
Greens	Dieter Janecek	13,180	7.9	▼0.5	27,261	16.3	▼1.5
FDP	Adrian Dunskus	8,098	4.8	▲0.5	19,896	11.9	▲6.1
Left	Klaus Schreer	4,768	2.9	▲1.8	6,577	3.9	▲2.6
Familie	Anton Wächter	1,720	1.0		861	0.5	
NPD	Stefan Werner	1,552	0.9		1,207	0.7	▲0.6
REP					719	0.4	▲0.1
GRAUEN					687	0.4	▲0.3
BP					591	0.4	▲0.2
BüSo	Werner Zuse	381	0.2	▲0.1	181	0.1	▲0.1
Humanist	Matthias-Johannes Holl	374	0.2	▲0.1			
Feminist					306	0.2	▲0.1
PBC					190	0.1	0.0
MLPD					64	0.0	
Informal votes		1,908			1,446		
Total valid votes		166,997			167,459		
Turnout		168,905	77.7	▼3.3			
CSU hold	Majority	5,718	3.4				
