= Beilngries =

- Town
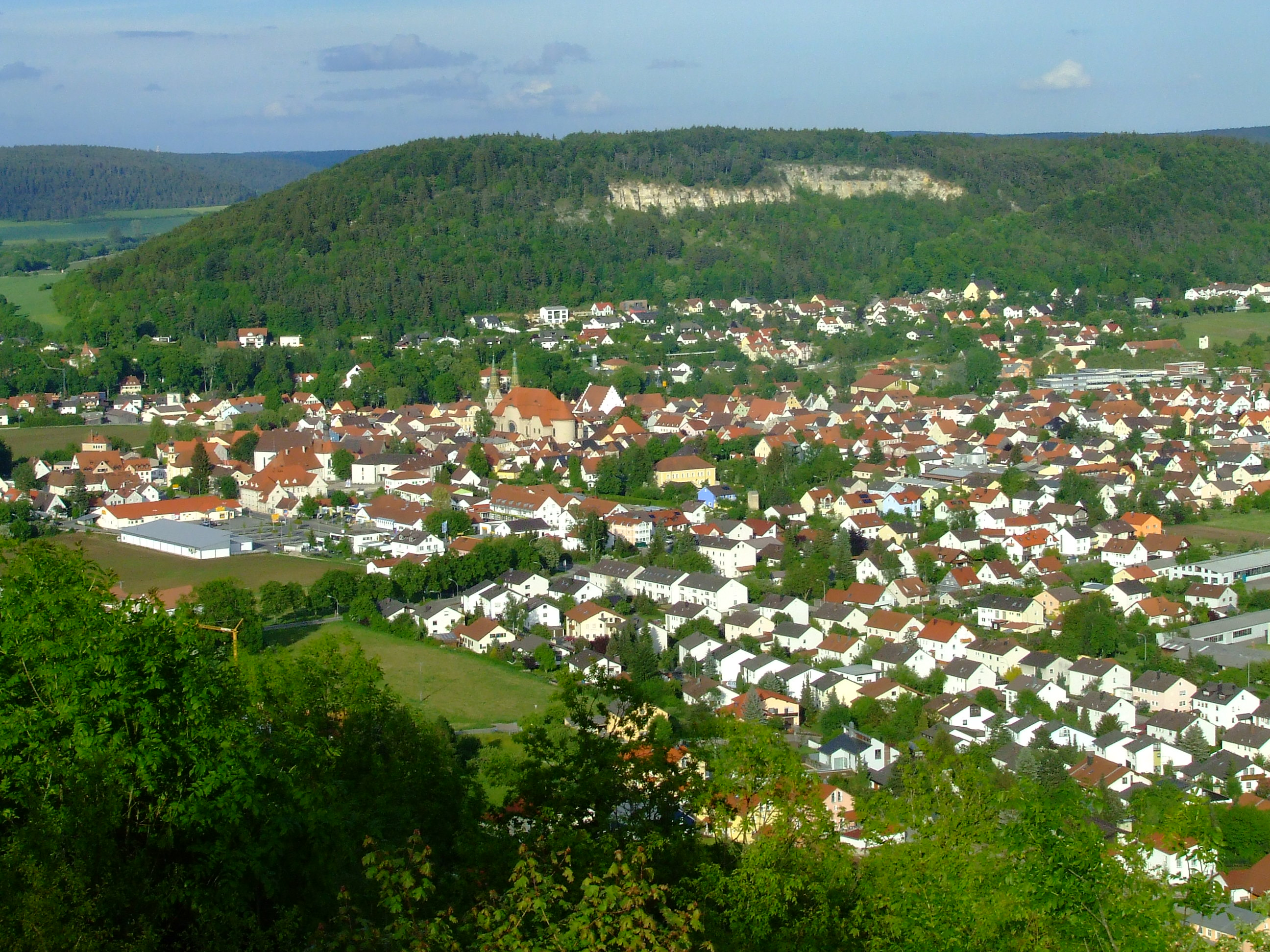
- Beilngries seen from Hirschberg

- Coat of arms

- Location of Beilngries within Eichstätt district
- Interactive map of Beilngries
- Location within Germany Location within Bavaria
- Coordinates: 49°2′N 11°28′E
- Country: Germany
- State: Bavaria
- Admin. region: Oberbayern
- District: Eichstätt
- Subdivisions: 19 Ortsteile

Government
  - Mayor (2020–26): Helmut Schloderer (Ind.)

Area
  - Total: 100.02 km^{2} (38.62 sq mi)
- Elevation: 368 m (1,207 ft)

Population (2025-12-31)
  - Total: 10,242
  - Density: 102.40/km^{2} (265.21/sq mi)
- Time zone: UTC+01:00 (CET)
  - Summer (DST): UTC+02:00 (CEST)
- Postal codes: 92339
- Dialling codes: 08461
- Vehicle registration: EI
- Website: www.beilngries.de

Beilngries (German pronunciation: [baɪlnˈɡʁiːs]; Bavarian: Beilngrias) is a town in the district of Eichstätt, in Bavaria, Germany. It is situated on the river Altmühl and the Rhine-Main-Danube Canal, 30 km north of Ingolstadt.

== Sons and daughters of the city ==
- Rosa Aschenbrenner (1885-1967), socialist politician, member of the Bavarian Landtag 1921-1932 and 1946-1948
- Karl Harrer (1890-1926), sport journalist and founding member and party chairman of the German Workers' Party, the predecessor organization of the Nationalsozialistische Deutschen Arbeiterpartei (NSDAP)
