= Karl Aderhold =

German politician (1884–1921)

Karl Aderhold (30 June 1884, in Stolberg, Province of Saxony – 20 June 1921, in Hanover) was a German politician. He represented the Independent Social Democratic Party of Germany.

== Career ==
The son of a miner, he came from the Harz Mountains, and until 1898 attended elementary school in Stolberg. He then learned the carpentry trade. In 1917, he joined the Independents and, from November 1918, Aderhold worked for the Hanoverian Workers' and Soldiers group and represented them until 1919 as deputy chief of police in Hanover's police headquarters. He was a city councilman in Hanover and in 1919 was elected to the German constitutional National Assembly. From 1919 until his early death in 1921 he was chairman of the municipal council and a member of the Reichstag. From 1920 to 1921, he was also a member of the Province of Hanover's provincial parliament.

== See also ==
- List of Independent Social Democratic Party politicians

== Literature ==
- Dirk Böttcher et al. (ed.): Hannoversches Biographisches Lexikon. Von den Anfängen bis zur Gegenwart. Schlütersche, Hannover 2002 (ISBN 3-87706-706-9), p. 23.
