= Herbert Wehner =

German politician (1906–1990)

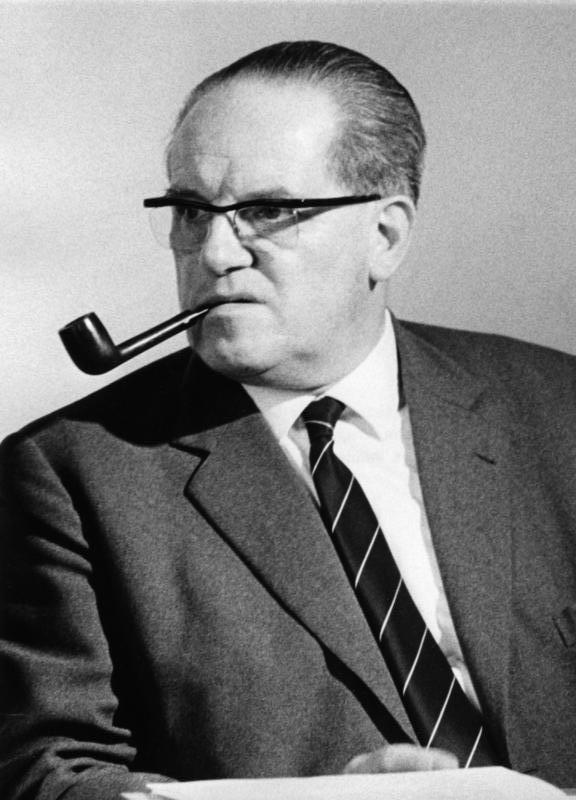
- Iconic portrait of Minister Wehner with his pipe, 1966

President by right of age of the Bundestag
- In office 4 November 1980 – 29 March 1983
- Preceded by: Ludwig Erhard
- Succeeded by: Willy Brandt

Leader of the Opposition
- In office 1 October 1982 – 6 March 1983
- Chancellor: Helmut Kohl
- Preceded by: Helmut Kohl
- Succeeded by: Hans-Jochen Vogel

Leader of the Social Democratic Party in the Bundestag
- In office 22 October 1969 – 8 March 1983
- Chancellor: Willy Brandt; Walter Scheel (acting); Helmut Schmidt; Helmut Kohl
- Preceded by: Helmut Schmidt
- Succeeded by: Hans-Jochen Vogel

Minister of Intra-German Relations
- In office 1 December 1966 – 21 October 1969
- Chancellor: Kurt Georg Kiesinger
- Preceded by: Johann Baptist Gradl
- Succeeded by: Egon Franke

Member of the Bundestag
- In office 7 September 1949 – 29 March 1983
- Preceded by: Constituency established
- Succeeded by: Hans-Ulrich Klose
- Constituency: Hamburg VII (1949–1965); Harburg (1965–1980); Hamburg-Harburg (1980–1983)

Member of the Landtag of Saxony
- In office 10 July 1930 – 18 June 1931
- Preceded by: Multi-member district
- Succeeded by: Max Silbermann

Personal details
- Born: Richard Herbert Wehner; 11 July 1906 Dresden, Germany
- Died: 19 January 1990 (aged 83) Bonn, West Germany
- Party: Social Democratic (1946–1990)
- Other political affiliations: KPD (1927–1942)
- Spouse(s): Lotte Loebinger (m. 1927; div. 1928) Charlotte Burmester (m. 1944; died 1979) Greta Burmester (m. 1983)
- Children: 2 (adopted)
- Occupation: Politician
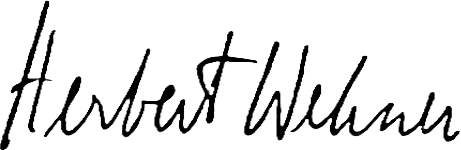
- Signature
- Central institution membership: 1935–1942: Full member, KPD Politburo; 1935–1942: Full member, KPD Central Committee; Other offices held: 1929–1931: Organizational Leader, Saxony KPD

Richard Herbert Wehner (11 July 1906 – 19 January 1990) was a German politician. A former member of the Communist Party of Germany (KPD), he joined the Social Democratic Party of Germany (SPD) after World War II. He served as Federal Minister of Intra-German Relations from 1966 to 1969 and thereafter as chairman of the SPD parliamentary group in the Bundestag until 1983.

During his tenure in the Bundestag from 1949 to 1983, Wehner became famous for his caustic rhetoric and heckling style, often hurling personal insults at MPs with whom he disagreed. He holds the record for official censures (77 by one count, 78 or 79 by others) handed down by the presiding officer.

== Life ==
Wehner was born in Dresden, the son of a shoemaker. His father was active in his trade union and a member of the SPD. More radical than his father, Wehner engaged in anarcho-syndicalist circles around Erich Mühsam, driven by the 1923 invasion of Reichswehr troops into the Free State of Saxony at the behest of the DVP–SPD Reich government of Chancellor Gustav Stresemann. He also fell out with Mühsam, whose pacifist manners he rejected and was accused of stealing money by him, which Wehner never denied. He joined the KPD in 1927, becoming an official of the party's Rote Hilfe organisation the same year.

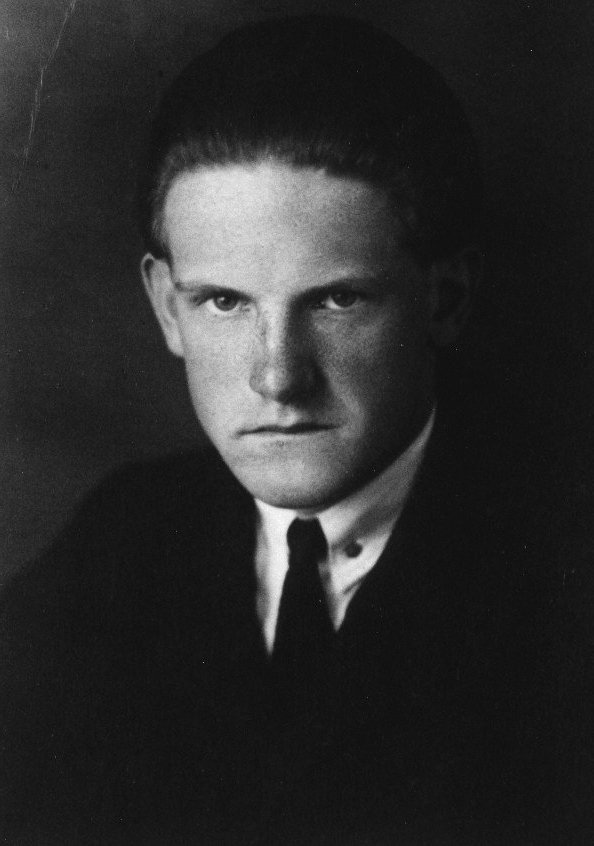
Wehner in the 1930s

Wehner rose quickly and was elected to the Landtag state legislature of Saxony in 1930. Nevertheless, he resigned one year later to work at the KPD politburo in Berlin with Walter Ulbricht. After Hitler's seizure of power in January 1933, he participated in the communist resistance against the Nazi regime from the Saar Protectorate. When the Saar was re-incorporated in 1935, Wehner went into exile, first to Paris, then in 1937 to Moscow, where he lived at Hotel Lux, wrote for the Deutsche Zentral-Zeitung and had to face Joseph Stalin's Great Purge of 1937–38.

After Wehner's death, German news magazine Der Spiegel documented accusations that he informed the NKVD on several party fellows like Hugo Eberlein, presumably to save his own life. After being sent to neutral Sweden in 1941 in order to re-enter Germany, he was arrested at Stockholm and interned for espionage in 1942. Whether he deliberately went into custody has not been conclusively established; he was excluded from the KPD by politburo chief Wilhelm Pieck.

Upon his return to Germany in 1946, Wehner joined the SPD in Hamburg and soon became an aide of Chairman Kurt Schumacher. After the 1949 federal election he entered the Bundestag parliament and remained an MP until his retirement from politics in 1983, from 1952 to 1958 also as a member of the European Parliament. In the 1957/1958 years and again from 1964 to 1966, he served as deputy chairman of the SPD parliamentary group. Wehner was instrumental in the party's adoption of the Godesberg Program in which the SPD repudiated a fixation on Marxist ideology and broadened its appeal. In 1966, he was named Federal Minister for All-German Affairs in the CDU–SPD grand coalition government of Chancellor Kurt Georg Kiesinger.

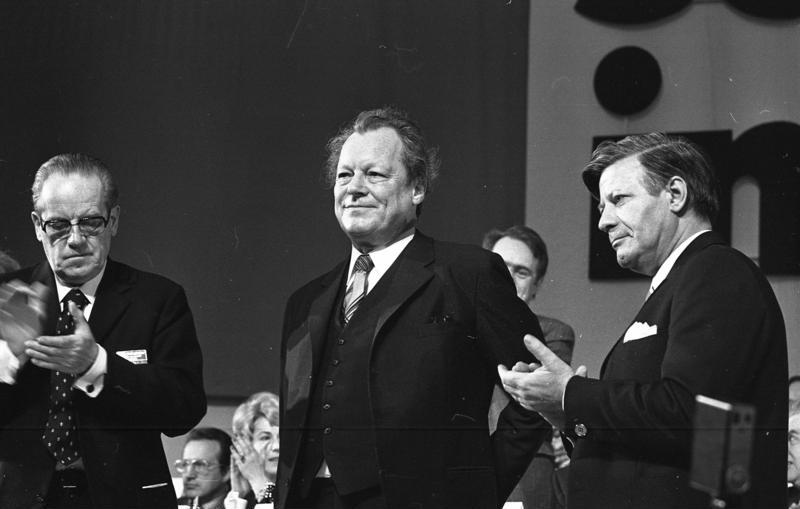
Wehner (left), Brandt and Schmidt (right) at a SPD convention in Hanover, 1973

The cooperation between the ex-Communist and the former member of the Nazi Party went well; Wehner even promised the CDU partners to stabilize the coalition by backing the implementation of a plurality voting system, which he later denoted as "nonsense". When the SPD assumed the reins of government under Chancellor Willy Brandt upon the 1969 federal election, Wehner became chairman of the SPD parliamentary faction. He was known as a hard disciplinarian who kept his members in line. When the CDU on 27 April 1972 waged a constructive vote of no confidence against Brandt, he ordered the SPD deputies not to participate in the ballot in order to exclude possible bribed dissidents. The opposing candidate Rainer Barzel failed to reach the absolute majority by two votes. After Brandt was re-elected in 1972, the relations between the two men cooled down during the 1973 oil crisis, when Wehner increasingly viewed the chancellor's policies as indecisive. In the course of the Guillaume Affair, he did not make great efforts to persuade Brandt to stay in office and promoted the chancellorship of Helmut Schmidt.

Already Father of the House from 1980, Wehner did not seek re-election in 1983, after the social-liberal coalition had finally broken up. He retired to Bonn, where he died in 1990 at the age of 83 after a long illness, suffering from Diabetes mellitus and Binswanger's disease.

== Rhetoric ==
Wehner held an infamous reputation among members of the Bundestag and the public for his sharp and often insulting rhetoric towards MPs who disagreed with him. His remarks about political opponents often revolved around insulting word plays with their respective last names. One notable exception is his pejorative neologism Düffeldoffel, which he used to insult Helmut Kohl. His sharp comments would not stop at his own party either. When the SPD MP Franz Josef Zebisch complained about how the alphabetic seating order in the Bundestag in the 1960s left him at the back of the room, Wehner told him to just rename himself to "Comrade Asshole".

German media occasionally depicts Wehner and CSU-politician Franz Josef Strauß to have been political rivals as both had highly influential yet never the highest positions within their respective parties and Strauß was also known for a fierce albeit less personally insulting rhetoric. Wehner's reception across the aisle among CDU/CSU politicians was mostly negative due to his rhetoric. However, CDU politician Heiner Geißler acknowledged Wehner's uncompromising style of standing up for his party's positions as "the biggest parliamentary howitzer of all time".
