= Stephan Pilsinger =

German politician

Stephan Pilsinger MdB
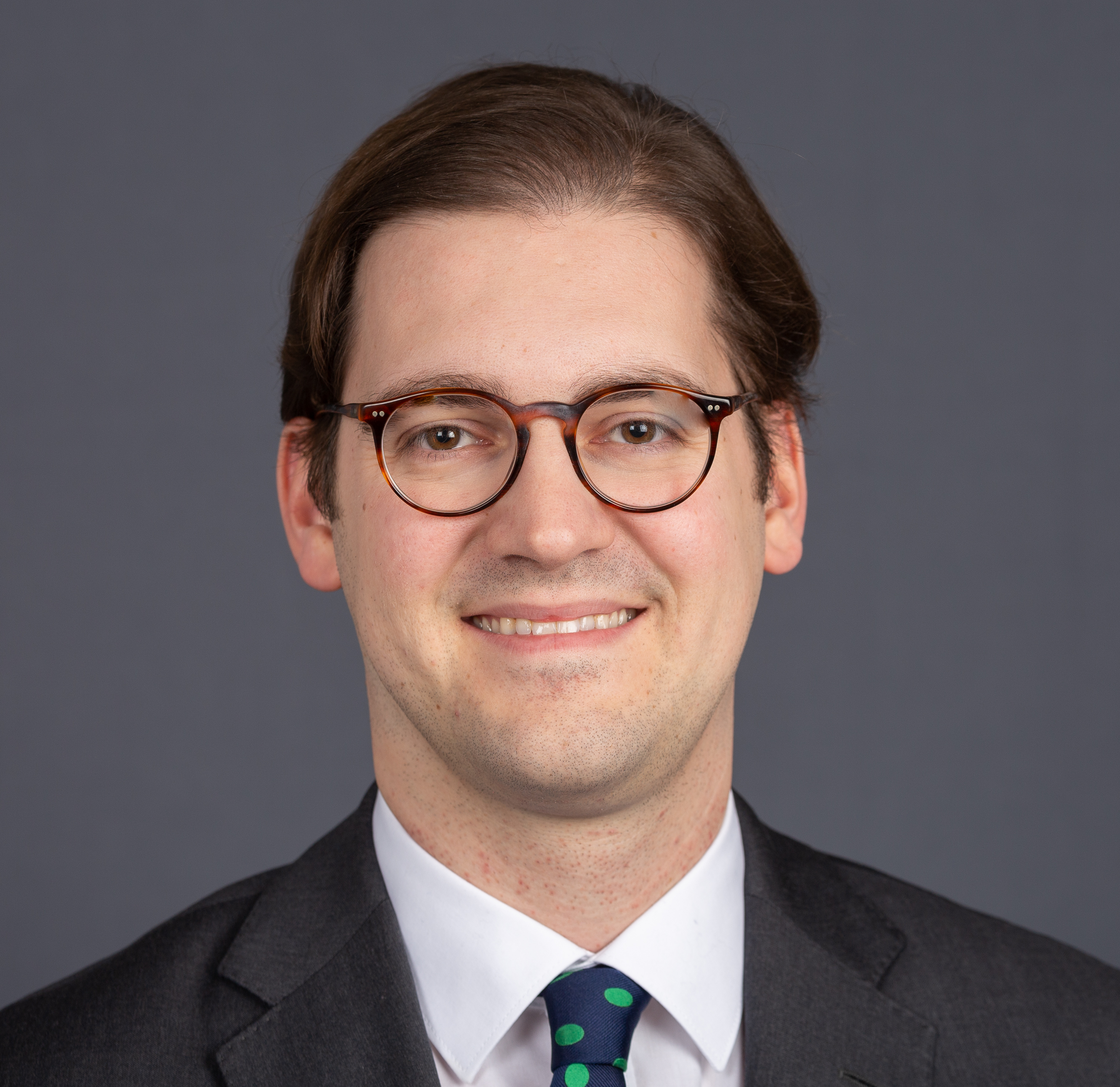
- Pilsinger in 2020

Member of the Bundestag; for Munich West/Centre
- Incumbent
- Assumed office 24 October 2017
- Preceded by: Hans-Peter Uhl

Personal details
- Born: 17 February 1987 (age 39) Munich, West Germany
- Party: Christian Social Union
- Education: LMU Munich

Stephan Pilsinger (born 17 February 1987) is a German physician and politician of the Christian Social Union (CSU) who has been serving as a member of the Bundestag from the state of Bavaria since 2017.

On 6 July 2023, Pilsinger said with regard to assisted suicide that his worldview did not correspond with the constitution: "Since the ruling of the Federal Constitutional Court, which decided that everyone must have access to assisted suicide, it is currently possible for even people who are young and healthy to make use of assisted suicide. To be honest, this does not correspond to my worldview."

== Political career ==
Pilsinger became a member of the Bundestag in the 2017 German federal election. He is a member of the Committee on Health, the Committee on Family, Senior Citizens, Women and Youth, and the Subcommittee on Civilian Crisis Prevention.

== Other activities ==
- German-Israeli Health Forum for Artificial Intelligence (GIHF-AI), Member of the Board of Trustees (since 2022)
- German Red Cross (DRK), Member
