= Hans-Peter Uhl =

German politician (1944–2019)

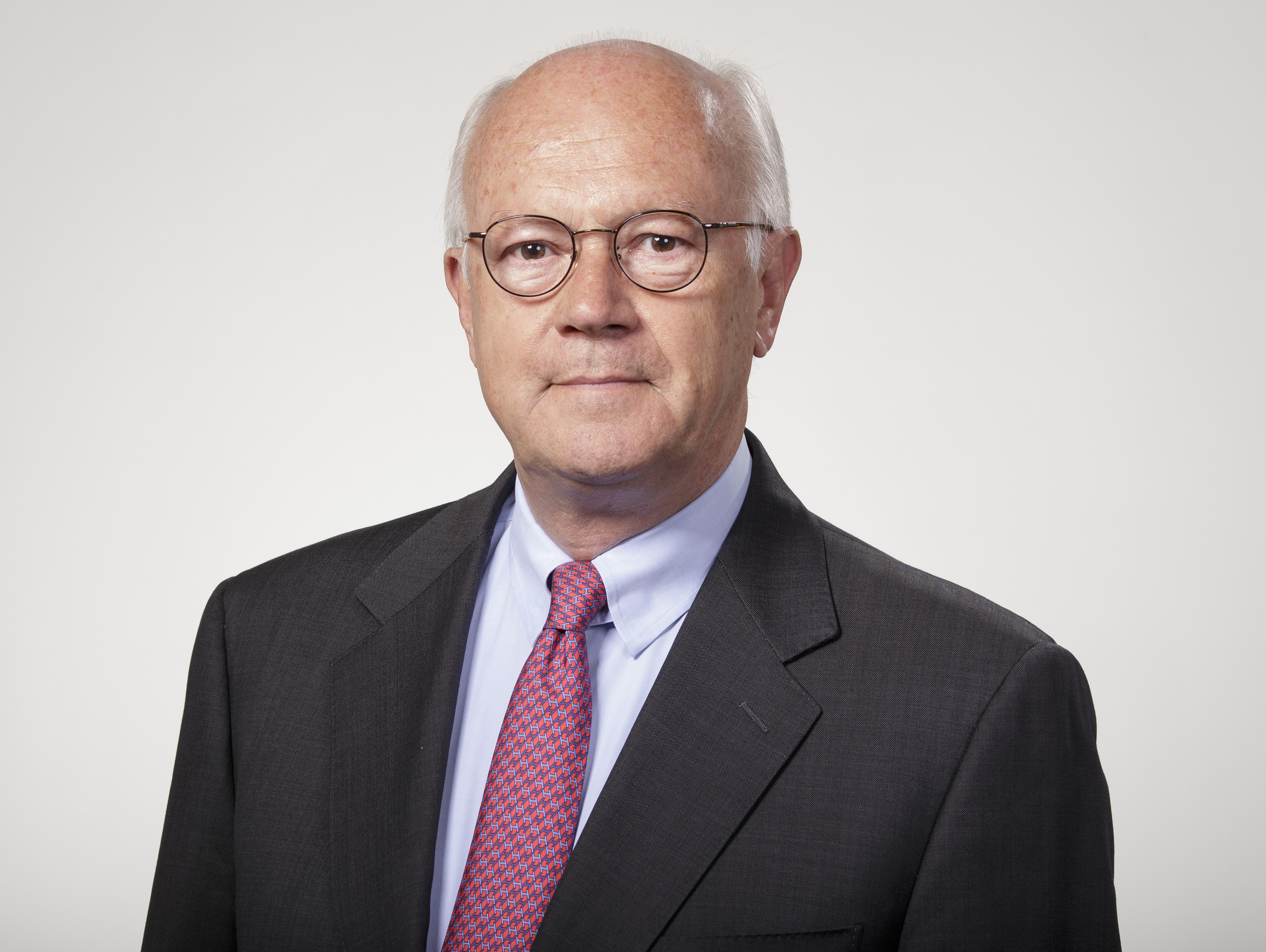
- Uhl in 2012

Member of the Bundestag
- In office 26 October 1998 – 24 October 2017
- Preceded by: Matthäus Strebl
- Succeeded by: Stephan Pilsinger
- Constituency: Munich West (1998–2002); Munich West/Centre (2002–2017)

Personal details
- Born: 5 August 1944 Tübingen, Germany
- Died: 27 October 2019 (aged 75)
- Party: Christian Social Union
- Children: 4
- Education: LMU Munich
- Profession: Lawyer

Hans-Peter Uhl (5 August 1944 – 27 October 2019) was a German politician of the Christian Social Union of Bavaria (CSU). He was a member of the Bundestag for almost 20 years.

== Political career ==
Uhl was a lawyer. He became a member of the CSU in 1970. He was elected to the Bundestag, the German parliament, in 1998, representing the constituency of West Munich, and was reelected four consecutive terms (in 2002, 2005, 2009 and 2013).

Uhl chaired the parliamentary inquiry committee investigating the German Visa Affair 2005. Between 2005 and 2013, he was spokesman for interior policy of the CDU/CSU parliamentary group. In this capacity, he repeatedly rejected efforts to liberalize Germany's strict rules regarding dual citizenship, arguing that "[it] is a question of loyalty to the German state" and that "individuals with dual nationality, if involved in any criminal activities, can evade the judicial authorities by using their second passport." With regard to proposals for extending voting rights to foreigners, he argued that such a law would be unconstitutional and that the only reason left-wing parties support the initiative was to expand their own potential electorate to non-EU citizens in Germany as the number of foreigners increases. demanding adjustments to Europe's border-free travel regime, the Schengen Agreement, to allow the re-introduction of border checks under specified conditions. Since 2005, Uhl served as Deputy Chairman of the German-Chinese Parliamentary Friendship Group.

In the context of the 2013 global surveillance disclosures, German news magazine Focus cited Uhl as saying that U.S. contracting companies such as Cisco Systems, which manages much of the German armed forces' data, needed to be required by contract not to pass sensitive material to the U.S. National Security Agency (NSA). At the same time, Uhl was a longstanding supporter of using telecommunications data retention by German authorities in order to monitor internet traffic and telephone conversations. With regard to control of internet pages, Uhl referred to China as an example in 2009.

Following the 2013 federal elections, Uhl was part of the CDU/CSU team in the negotiations with the SPD on a coalition agreement.

From 2014, Uhl was a member of the parliament's Council of Elders, which – among other duties – determines daily legislative agenda items and assigning committee chairpersons based on party representation. He also served on the Committee on Foreign Affairs and its Sub-Committee for Civilian Crisis Prevention as well as on the Committee for the Scrutiny of Elections, Immunity and the Rules of Procedure. In addition, he represented his parliamentary group in a crossparty committee headed by former defense minister Volker Rühe to review the country's parliamentary rules on military deployments.

== Other activities ==
- German European Security Association, member of the political advisory board
