= Hedwig Krüger =

German politician (1882–1938)

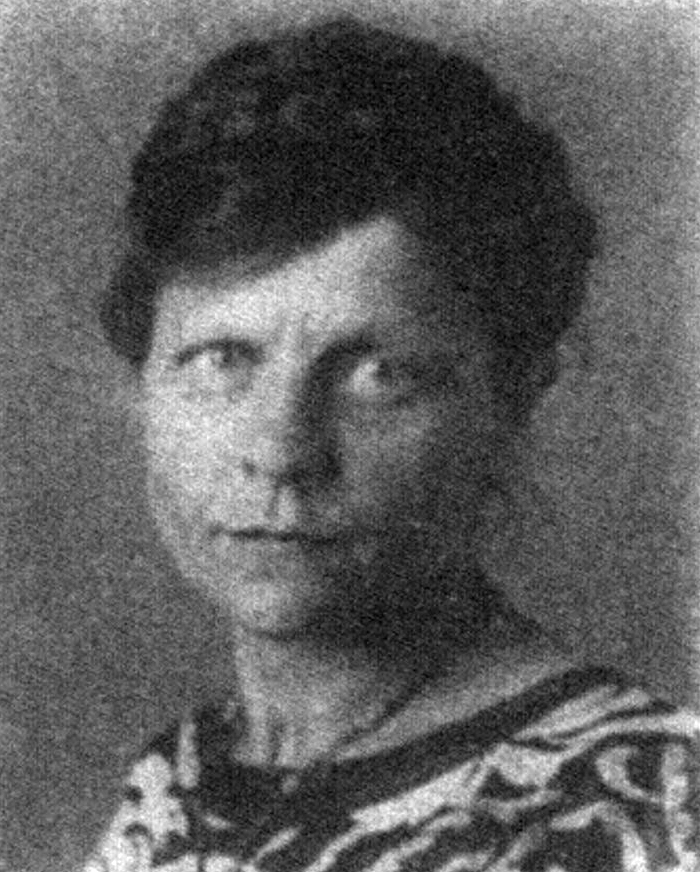
- Krüger c. 1924
- Born: Hedwig Hennig; 1 April 1882; Leipzig, Saxony, Germany
- Died: 16 February 1938 (aged 55); Halle, Saxony, Germany
- Occupations: Political Activist; Politician
- Political party: SPD; USPD; KPD
- Spouse: Max Krüger
- Central institution membership: 1920–1921: Member, KPD Central Commission

Hedwig Krüger (born Hedwig Hennig; 1 April 1882 – 16 February 1938) was a German Communist politician. She was a member of the national parliament ("Reichstag") between May and December 1924.

== Life ==
=== Early years ===
Hedwig Hennig was born in Leipzig. Her father, August Hedwig, was a metal worker from Dessau and an early member of the Social Democratic Party ("Sozialdemokratische Partei Deutschlands" / SPD): he had, in consequence, fallen foul of the Anti-Socialist Laws enacted by the Bismarck government between 1878 and 1881. It was because of this that he had been obliged to leave Dessau, settling briefly in Leipzig before moving on again, to Halle, which is where his family grew up. After leaving school Hedwig took a clerical job with the local health insurance organisation (Krankenkasse).

=== Political awakening ===
She came from a politically engaged family, and as a teenager was active within the Workers' Education League ("Arbeiterbildungsverein"). In April 1908 the National Association Law opened the way for women to join political parties, and in the same year Hedwig Hennig joined the SPD. Within he party she campaigned for the party to encourage greater youth involvement.

=== Political engagement ===
The decision of the SPD leadership in 1914 to support funding for the war had not been universally supported within the party, and became more contentious as the slaughter on the frontline and destitution at home grew. In 1917 the party split apart, primarily over the issue of support for the war, and Hedwig Hennig moved over with breakaway faction, which became known as the Independent Social Democratic Party (Unabhängige Sozialdemokratische Partei Deutschlands / USPD). When the USPD itself split three years later she was part of the majority that made up the newly created German Communist Party. At the Unification Party Congress she was elected a member of the new party's Central Committee.

=== Local politics ===
In 1921 and again in 1924, Hedwig Krüger was voted a USPS/Communist member of the Halle city parliament ("Stadtparlament"), but on both occasions she found herself resigning her seat before the end of the full legislative term. On the first occasion her participation in the Workers' Revolt of March 1921 landed her with a long prison sentence. In the end, as political tensions eased slightly, she was able to secure an early release through a hunger strike. She resigned after less than a year from her second stint in the Halle City Parliament in December 1924 when she was elected to the Prussian regional parliament (Landtag).

=== National politics ===
At the same time, on the national political stage, in May 1924 Hedwig Krüger was elected to the Reichstag, representing the Halle-Merseburg electoral district (District 11). In the internal party strife that was a feature of the Communist Party during the 1920s she tended to find herself on the left of the party, grouped with comrades such as Ruth Fischer and Arkadi Maslow. She continued with the same group in 1925 when the party leadership was captured by a stalinist group centred on Ernst Thälmann. The Soviet and German communist parties were closely connected, and in September 1926 she was one of those who signed what came to be known as the "Letter from 700" ("Brief der 700"), protesting against Thälmann's uncritical backing for Stalin. However, she almost immediately came under pressure from the Party Central Committee and retracted her support for that letter, declaring that she should never have signed it in the first place. Even after this, however, meetings took place of comrades opposed to the party leadership such as, notably, Otto Kilian.

In April 1927 she received a further warning from the Central Committee after she signed a protest against the exclusion from the party of Jakob Ritter and others around him. As preparations were made for the 1928 General Election, Hedwig Krüger's name was no longer on the Communist Party candidate list. After this she no longer took any leading role within the party.

=== Nazi Germany ===
In January 1933 the backdrop changed dramatically when Nazis took power and converted Germany into a one-party dictatorship. Hedwig Krüger's work for the Communist Party, now undertaken under the false name "Rühle", was now illegal. She took work as a travelling sales agent for a Leipzig business, but was arrested at Leipzig in November 1934. She faced interrogation by the Gestapo in Leipzig and then in Halle. On 13 December 1934 she was placed in Moringen concentration camp. She was scheduled for release in May 1935, but after the camp administrators had determined that her communist convictions were undinimished she was allocated a further four weeks in solitary confinement. On 13 June 1935 she was released and returned to Halle.

== Personal ==
Around 1920 she married a carpenter called Max Krüger. He shared her political beliefs, but was less politically active than she, and he died in 1927. Childless, Hedwig Krüger nevertheless now found herself supporting her mother with bringing up the four children of her sister, also recently deceased, as well as her brother's son.

Hedwig Krüger died at Halle on 18 February 1938 as a result of her treatment in the concentration camp, where an appendicitis operation had been inappropriately deferred.
