= Karl Grönsfelder =

German politician (1882–1964)

- Born: 18 January 1882; Frankfurt am Main, Germany
- Died: 20 February 1964 (aged 82); Nuremberg, Bavaria, West Germany
- Occupation: Politician
- Political party: SPD; USPD; KPD; KPD-O
- Spouse: Emma
- Central institution membership: 1923–1925: Member, KPD Central Commission

Karl Grönsfelder (18 January 1882 – 20 February 1964) was a Bavarian political activist and politician (KPD).

When the Communist party was briefly banned in 1923/24, his activism earned him a period in "protective custody" in June 1924. A longer period of detention followed the Nazi take-over in 1933. After 1945 Grönsfelder returned to political activism, despite being marginalised and expelled (not for the first time) from the Communist Party in 1949.

== Life ==
=== Provenance and early years ===
Karl Grönsfelder was born in Frankfurt am Main. His parents were in service, his father as a coachman and his mother as a cook. He was brought up by his grandparents in Bartenstein, a small town remotely located in the hills between Heidelberg and Nuremberg. He acquired what was in most respects a basic education at the village school, also receiving training as a mechanic. Between 1900 and 1903 he worked as an itinerant mechanic, taking in Frankfurt, Düsseldorf, Siegburg, Krefeld and Cologne. In 1903 Grönsfelder settled in Nuremberg, which is where he would live for the rest of his life.

=== Nuremberg and socialist politics ===
Nuremberg was a booming industrial city and a bastion of Germany's increasingly assertive labour movement. In 1908 Grönsfelder joined the Social Democratic Party (Sozialdemokratische Partei Deutschlands / SPD). It was also in 1908 that he joined the Metal Workers' Union. Between 1910 and 1913 he was a member of a political circle of "young comrades" who studied socialist literature and backed the charismatic socialist philosopher-activist Rosa Luxemburg. During a period when the political left was buzzing with shifting thought patterns and alliances, he tended as a young man to find himself at the more extreme end of the party spectrum, and critical of what he would have identified as Bernstein revisionism. During the war years, between 1914 and 1918, his mechanical skills were much in demand.

=== Party splits ===
The decision in 1914 of the SPD leadership to accept what amounted to a political truce for the duration of the war became progressively more contentious within the party because of the industrial scale of the slaughter on the front and the destitution inflicted on the civilian population at home. In 1917 the party split apart, primarily over whether or not to continue to back parliamentary votes to fund the war. Grönsfelder was a member of the breakaway group that became the Independent Social Democratic Party (Unabhängige Sozialdemokratische Partei Deutschlands / USPD). Two years later, as the USPD itself broke up, he was a founder member in Nuremberg of the German Communist Party. Within the party he was an outspoken advocate, notably in respect of trades union matters. In 1920 the membership at Nuremberg's huge MAN truck plant elected him to the works council. Within the party he was a member of the regional leadership (Bezirksleitung), serving as chairman of it between 1921 and 1924. He represented the Nuremberg Communists at party conferences nationally, and, in the case of the Comintern Third World Congress held in Moscow in June 1921, internationally. In 1923, Grönsfelder was appointed to the party's Trades Union Commission and, at the same time, elected a member of the national party executive committee.

=== Party activism and Landtag membership ===
On 19 December 1923 he succeeded Josef Eisenberger as a communist member in the Bavarian Parliament (Landtag) after Eisenberger took a job in Moscow with the Comintern. Grönsfelder would continue to sit as a member till 1928. However, as economic destitution in the country spilled into violence the Communist Party was banned for several months at the end of 1923, and Grönsfelder, who continued with his party work, was arrested in June 1924 and, despite the parliamentary immunity which membership of the legislature should have conferred, briefly held in "protective custody". He was nevertheless released in time to participate in the regional elections of 1924 in which he was re-elected.

In 1925 he was combining his parliamentary work with work as ab party instructor for the Augsburg sub-district. In 1926 he became regional secretary and, after 1928, secretary for trades union matters in the North Bavaria regional leadership.

=== Party split ===
The death of Lenin early in 1924 opened the way for a lengthy and wide-ranging power struggle in the Soviet Communist Party. Savage factionalism in Moscow found its direct counterpart in the German Communist Party. By 1929 most party members in Moscow who might have constituted a threat to Stalin's agenda had been removed from positions of power and influence, while the German party was under the increasingly tight control of the hardline Stalinist faction around Ernst Thälmann. Within the party there was growing apprehension at the rise of the National Socialist Workers' (Nazi) Party, and there were those who advocated collaboration with the SPD in order more effectively to resist the Nazi tide. Stalin, his strategic vision honed by the Russian Civil War, was uncompromising in opposing any collaboration with the SPD, and the German party leadership under Thälmann took the same position, rejecting the idea of any compromise with the "Social Fascists". In the North Bavaria region Karl Grönsfelder, representing trades union opinion within the party on the issue, was forthright in his criticism of the party line, and in 1930 he was one of a number of leading communists in the Nuremberg leadership to find himself excluded from The Party.

In 1928 Heinrich Brandler and August Thalheimer, expelled from the Communist Party two years before Grönsfelder, had founded an alternative Communist Party, known as the Communist Party of Germany (Opposition) ( Kommunistische Partei Deutschlands (Opposition) / KPD (Opposition)) Karl Grönsfelder, together with a number of his party comrades in the Franconia / North Bavaria region, now joined the KPD (Opposition). The new alternative Communist Party failed to become the mainstream Communist Party and there was therefore never any chance of a united front against Nazism from the political left, but it nevertheless remained politically vigorous, and in the Nuremberg region Karl Grönsfelder was its leader.

=== A communist survivor in Nazi Germany ===
The political backdrop changed dramatically in January 1933 when the Nazis took power and converted Germany into a one-party dictatorship. Political activity (except in support of the Nazi party) became illegal. Grönsfelder was arrested by the Gestapo on 12 April 1933 and detained. After his arrest he was briefly held in a temporary prison in Fürth. In May 1933 he was placed for a short time in Stadelheim Prison (Munich) before being transferred to Dachau concentration camp. Grönsfelder later recalled that in the concentration camp internees from the Communist Party and those from the SPD agreed that they should never again "march alone", and these discussions were reflected elsewhere in Germany. However, with the party leaderships in exile in Paris and Moscow, and any communist leaders who had failed to escape now locked away, the practical impact of this belated reduction in communist hostility towards the moderate left SPD was not immediately apparent.

His wife, Emma Grönsfelder (1883–1967), had followed a political trajectory similar to his since 1918, and was arrested at the same time as her husband, and held in "protective custody" at the prison in Aichach between April and September 1933.

Many communist leaders arrested by the Gestapo spent the twelve Nazi years locked away. Others died in concentration camps. Karl Grönsfelder was released in 1935, however, after only two years in state custody. There is a suggestion that because of his growing deafness the authorities did not see him as such a major threat as some of his comrades. However, he was unable to register with the labour exchange. He was unemployed between 1935 and 1937, and kept under close state surveillance. After 1937, still closely monitored by the authorities, he was helped by a former Communist comrade identified as "Ludwig Sch." who had subsequently gone over to the Nazis (for what Grönsfelder, writing much later, described as "legitimate reasons" – aus ehelichen Gründen) to obtain work as a mechanic in the type-writer department at the Triumph factory (better remembered for manufacturing motor cycles) in Nuremberg.

War returned in September 1939 and Karl Grönsfelder was arrested again. However, his wife invoked the intervention of the influential former communist who had arranged his job at Triumph, and five days later he was released and sent back to work. Grönsfelder later asserted that if he had stayed in detention just one more day, he would have been transported to Buchenwald concentration camp. Instead, he appears to have spent most of the war years quietly working as a mechanic with Triumph. By 1944, however, aged 62, he was on long-term sick leave: in order to escape the by now constant scourge of the air raids on the cities, he was living in the countryside location to which his daughter and grand daughter had been evacuated.

=== Post war Bavaria ===
The war ended in May 1945 with Bavaria in the US occupation zone of what had been Germany. Communist Party membership was no longer illegal and Grönsfelder resumed his in 1946. In 1947 he joined the party's regional leadership team (Bezirksleitung) for Bavaria. However, as matters turned out the old tensions within the party had endured. Bavaria filled up with refugees displaced by the red army. Grönsfelder's continued readiness to criticise Stalin grated with members the German party leadership, for many of whom adherence to the Kremlin line was an integral part of being a good antifascist communist. Grönsfelder was denounced as a Titoist and supporter of the hated Brandler. He was expelled from the Communist Party, again, in 1949, although within Bavaria he remained an active and loquacious member of the regional leadership team (Bezirksleitung) till 1953, when he was required to retire on account of his age. By this time, the US occupation zone had been subsumed, in May 1949, into a new US sponsored West German state, and it was here, at Nuremberg, that Karl Grönsfelder died on 20 February 1964.
