= Agnes Plum =

German politician (1869–1951)

Agnes Plum (born Agnes Jansen: 9 April 1869 – 10 August 1951) was a German politician (SPD, KPD). Between 1925 and 1928 she was a Communist member of the national parliament (Reichstag).

== Life ==
Agnes Jansen was born in Bardenberg, today a part of Würselen, but then a small village to the north of Aachen, and close to the Dutch border. She attended school locally and then entered into domestic service. Sometime before 1905 she relocated to the economically dynamic Ruhr region and became an industrial worker. By this time she had been married twice, and had become Agnes Plum. 1905 was also the year in which she joined the Social Democratic Party.

When war broke out in 1914 many party members opposed the leadership decision to operate a political truce, which in effect meant voting in the Reichstag in support of war credits to fund the war, and refraining from criticism of the government for its duration. Three years later, as economic destitution at home and industrial scale slaughter on the frontline mounted, and the threat of annexation from the east by an autocratic czarist government appeared less immediate, the SPD broke apart over the issue. In 1917 Agnes Plum was one of those who went with the breakaway faction which became the Independent Social Democratic Party ("Unabhängige Sozialdemokratische Partei Deutschlands" / USPD). Three years later, when the USPD itself broke up, at the end of 1920 Plum was a delegate at the party conference at which a left-wing majority, of which she was a part, joined up with the newly formed German Communist Party. She was on the party's left wing. At this time Plum was living and working in the industrial Schonnebeck quarter of Essen, where she was also a member of the local council and, probably, of the regional parliament ("Landtag") in Düsseldorf. Within the local party leadership ("Bezirksleitung") she was leader in the women's section, also having involvement in the Roter Frauen und Mädchen Bund (RFMB), the female section of the party's quasi-military wing.

On 5 December 1925 Plum entered the national parliament (Reichstag) as the Communist member for Düsseldorf East. She entered as a replacement for her party comrade Artur König who had been required by the party to give up his seat following financial losses for which he, as treasurer responsible for monies allocated to producing certain party newspapers, was blamed. There was no suggestion that König had enriched himself personally, but a significant amount of money had nevertheless been lost. Plum remained a Reichstag member till 1928, but she was not re-elected at the next general election, and her sixtieth birthday, which she reached in 1929, appears to have put an end to any further high-profile political activity.
