= Willy Sachse =

- Born: 7 January 1896; Leipzig, Saxony, Germany
- Died: 21 August 1944 (aged 48); Brandenburg Prison, Brandenburg an der Havel, Province of Brandenburg, Germany
- Occupations: Revolutionary and political activist Writer
- Political party: USPD; KPD
- Spouse: Johanna Petzold
- Children: Werner Sachse (ca. 1920 - <1942)
- Parent(s): Karl Arthur Sachse; Alwine Näther
- Central institution membership: 1921–1925: Member, KPD Central Commission

Willy Sachse (7 January 1896 – 21 August 1944) was a German socialist and communist who took part in the Sailors' Revolt at the end of the First World War. He remained politically involved during the 1920s and later became a writer. Drawn back into political activism during the early 1940s, he died by execution at the Brandenburg Prison.

== Life ==
Willy Sachse was born in Leipzig. Karl Arthur Sachse, his father, was a cooper at the time of his birth, but by 1918 his parents were running a guest house in Thuringia. After attending junior school and a few years at middle school he embarked on an apprenticeship in mechanical engineering ("als Feinmechaniker") with Saalbock & Co of Leipzig. There are indications that during this period he became involved in the socialist youth movement. Little more is known of his childhood and teenage years, but the apprenticeship selected for him suggests that his parents were ambitious on his behalf, and that he himself was not without promise. Later, when he took to writing, many of his novels concerned life at sea, and were written with a descriptive clarity suggesting personal experience of seafaring far beyond anything that he would have acquired merely through serving in the navy during the war.

War broke out in July 1914 and Sachse was conscripted into the navy. He served initially on the liner Friedrich der Große. He reached the rank of senior stoker (Oberheizer). During 1917 he was one of the organisers of political resistance in the navy which would culminate in the Kiel mutiny, itself a trigger for the ensuing wave of revolution across Germany.

Because of the leading role he had played in organising a sailors' mutiny in the imperial high seas fleet Sachse was sentenced on 26 August 1917 to death, withdrawal of citizen's rights for the rest of his life and dismissal from the navy. Others condemned to undergo the same sentence in respect of the same charges were Max Reichpietsch and Albin Köbis. Reichpietsch and Köbis were shot by a firing squad on 5 September 1917. Willy Sachse aged 21, was younger than these others. Also, as it later transpired, a powerfully moving letter requesting mercy was sent on his behalf to the chancellor, pointing out, among other things, that he was his parents' only son, and so their only hope of avoiding destitution in old age. There is much about this letter that remains a mystery but, regardless of why and how, the authorities commuted Sachse's death sentence, substituting a 15-year jail term, while the lifetime loss of citizen's rights was replaced with a finite five year deprivation.

In the context of the November revolution Sachse was freed from the prison at Rendsburg at the end of 1918. According to one version he was physically extracted by revolutionary sailors: another version indicates simply that he was a beneficiary of a judicial amnesty on 12 November 1918. Both versions agree that the prison was stormed, and that the subsequent amnesty was no more than a pragmatic judicial acceptance of something the authorities had been unable to prevent. Once at liberty (unless he had already done so) Sachse joined recently newly formed Independent Social Democratic Party ("Unabhängige Sozialdemokratische Partei Deutschlands" / USPD) which had broken away from the mainstream Social Democratic Party in 1917 as the result of increasingly fevered disagreement within the party over whether or not to back parliamentary votes to fund the war.

During the postwar revolutionary period Sachse was a member of the Soldiers' and Workers' Council in Leipzig. As the USPD itself split apart, at the end of 1920, Sachse was part of the majority that switched to the recently launched Communist Party of Germany. The next year he was one of the leaders of the short-lived March Action (workers' revolt) in central Germany. In 1922 he became a party official, listed as the full-time party secretary for the party's Bitterfeld subregion ("Unterbezirk Bitterfeld"). At the seventh party congress, held in Jena in 1921, and again at the eighth party congress, held in Leipzig in 1924, Sachse was elected to the party Central Committee ("Zentralausschuß"). In February 1923 he succeeded Georg Schumann as policy chief for the party's Halle-Merseburg region. In 1924 the party leadership may have sent him to Frankfurt am Main to take over as policy chief for the party's Hessen region. Confusingly, in Frankfurt he undertook his party work using the pseudonym "Schumann". Later he was transferred to Hamburg where, now using the party pseudonym "Willy Halle", in October 1925 he was appointed policy chief (later organisation chief) for the party's Wasserkant ("Waterside") region.

It is often hard to determine just what tasks the position of an active party official actually involved. Sources seeking to build up a comrade's revolutionary credentials may exaggerate the revolutionary aspects, while testimonies presented to government or police authorities may underplay them. It appears that being known as a man who had survived a death sentence for revolutionary activities back in 1917 gave Sachse a certain kudos with comrades, and during the 1920s he became increasingly effective as a writer-journalist who a took real delight in writing. It may be because much of Sachse's political work took place on the outer fringes of legality that sources are not always unanimous over where he was when. He clearly visited the Soviet Union during the middle 1920s. According to one source there were two lengthy visits: between January 1924 and January 1925 he visited Moscow and Leningrad, with a second visit taking place between May and October 1925. A principal objective of these visits seems to have been his participation in a lengthy course in journalism. There are reports that in December 1925 the police in Moscow were looking for him, but by this time he was probably back in Germany.

In his posthumously published memoire, "Der Rote Graf" ("The Red Count") Alexander Stenbock-Fermor recalled Willy Sachse with affection:

I liked him at once: a thickset man, who felt like an "agreeable neighbour", warm and open-hearted, who liked to live well. But each time you spoke with him your awareness of his deep political wisdom and the astonishing breadth of his general knowledge was increased. Er gefiel mir sofort: ein dicker, schwerer Mann, der wie ein gemütlicher ›Nachbar‹ wirkte, weltoffen und heiter, das gute Leben schätzend. Doch bei jedem Gespräch spürte man sein großes politisches Wissen und seine erstaunliche Allgemeinbildung

On 6 March 1926 the "Hamburger Echo", a Social Democratic newspaper, published exerts from a grovelling letter which Sachse was said to have sent to the Kaiser in 1917, begging for mercy in respect of the death sentence he received that year. Sachse always insisted that no such letter had been written by him, but his reputation within the party was nevertheless tarnished and he lost his place on the party central committee. His position with the Hamburg party also became difficult, and he left the city, moving back to Leipzig, in or before May 1926.

The second half of 1926 Sachse spent in a Leipzig prison cell, held in "investigative custody" on suspicion of having committed high treason. In the event, very little investigation seems to have taken place, with Sachse undergoing very little questioning during his imprisonment. He was - as was normal in Germany - permitted to exchange letters and write articles for friends during this time, although outbound correspondence tended to be held up for weeks while prison staff laboriously copied down their contents. His arrest was triggered by a renewed interest on the part of the authorities in Sachse's role in the mutiny that had occurred in the imperial fleet in 1917. Their attention had been caught by a stout leaflet circulated among Communist Party members, initially in 1923, on the subject of the sailors' insurrection. The document was authored by someone using the name "Anti-Nautikus". It subsequently emerged that Anti-Nautikus was a pseudonym used by Sachse himself. On any suspected culpability regarding the naval mutiny, Sachse maintained that he had already been expelled from the navy and suffered five year's loss of civic rights, and was in any case the beneficiary of the judicial amnesty of 12 November 1918. On 22 January 1927 Willy Sachse was set free from his prison cell.

It was presumably the same text by "Anti-Nautikus" that was published under the title "Germany's Revolutionary Sailors" ("Deutschlands revolutionäre Matrosen") during 1925, with a foreword added by Ernst Thälmann, a party leader. In January 1926 the publication was confiscated. Despite being in prison, from May 1926 Sachse was listed as the Arts and Supplement editor ("Kultur- und Feuilletonredakteur") on the Leipzig-based "Sächsische Arbeiterzeitung" ("Saxony Workers' Newspaper"), then published on behalf of the party under the editorial direction of Paul Böttcher. Meanwhile, despite his release from prison at the start of 1927, he continued to face questioning from the Parliamentary Committee of Investigation into the Maritime Mutiny of 1917. It was only on 2 April 1928 that the investigation concluded with an acquittal, due to insufficiency of the evidence against him ("mangels genügender Beweise").

Books authored by Willy Sachse

Non-fiction

- as "Anti-Nautikus": Deutschlands Revolutionäre Matrosen. With a foreword by Ernst Thälmann. Hamburg 1925

Adventure-travel novels published under a modified version of his own name or pseudonyms:

- as Willi Richard Sachse: Rost an Mann und Schiff. Ein Bekenntnisroman um Skagerrak, Traditionsverlag, Berlin 1934;
- as Jan Murr: Heizer Jan. Erlebnisse und Abenteuer auf See, Verlag Junge Generation, Berlin 1934;
- as Hein Snut: Klaus Timm: Der Held von Kamerun. Nach seinen eigenen Erlebnissen, Verlagshaus Freya, Heidenau 1934;
- as Willy Richard Sachse: Wettfahrt mit Tod und Teufel. Roman, Buchmeister-Verlag sowie Büchergilde Gutenberg, Berlin 1934;
- as Jan Murr: 'Tom ... Tom ... '. Eine Erzählung aus dem Regenwald Madagaskars, Verlag Junge Generation, Berlin 1934;
- as Willy Richard Sachse: Jonetta. Roman einer Seefahrt, Verlag Junge Generation, Berlin 1934;
- as Willy Richard Sachse: Alaska Jim. Ein Held der Kanadischen Polizei, Verlagshaus Freya, Heidenau 1935;
- as Jan Murr: Der Admiral. Leben und Tod derer von Falkland, Verlag Junge Generation, Berlin 1935;
- as Jan Murr: Robben-Roy, Verlag von Schmidt und Spring, Leipzig o.J. (1936);
- as Jan Murr: Die Sechs vom 'Brummer', Verlag H.-J. Fischer, 1936; Stick Bummys Vermächtnis. Abenteuer-Roman, Verlag Das Vaterland, Niedersedlitz, 1936;
- as Jan Murr: Schwarzmesser. Roman, List Verlag, Leipzig 1936
- as Jan Murr: Die Männer der Fortune, List-Verlag Leipzig 1935

The Communist Party of Germany was closely linked to the Communist Party of the Soviet Union at this time, and the increasingly savage tensions in Moscow between Stalin and those whom he suspected (not necessarily without cause) of wishing to replace him were reflected in growing internal party divisions in Berlin. Willy Sachse was identified by the party leadership as a supporter of August Thalheimer and Heinrich Brandler. Sachse had been having his own differences with the party leadership since at least as far back as 1923, and when, at the end of 1928, Thalheimer and Brandler were expelled from the party, Sachse was among those removed at the same time. Those expelled set up an alternative communist party, known as the Communist Party of Germany (Opposition) ("Kommunistische Partei Deutschlands (Opposition) " / KPDO). Sachse joined the KPDO in Leipzig, although he left it again in 1932 or 1933. but in most respects he appears to have withdrawn from political engagement before 1933. During the early 1930s he also worked briefly as an employee with Willi Münzenberg's media conglomerate.

Starting in 1934, writing under several different names and pseudonyms, Willy Sachse emerged as a writer of travel and adventure novels. During just three years, between 1934 and 1936, at least twelve of these conspicuously unpolitical books were published, of which six were published in 1934 alone. Given the size of the books and the way in which they appear to have been carefully crafted, sources suggest that even a well practiced novelist would have needed around one year to produce each one, which gives rise to speculation that many the books were written during the 1920s, but the author only got round to finding a publisher for them after removing himself from political involvement. The books were even translated for sale in French. Despite meeting with some success commercially, Sachse was excluded from the government sponsored Reich Chamber of Literature after he turned down the idea that he should write a book about sea travel "with a Nazi flavour" (" ... über die Seefahrt im nationalsozialistischen Sinne").

In 1939 he took a job as a technical draftsman with a chemical factory. Shortly after this he got to know Beppo Römer, to whom he seems to have been recommended by Alexander Stenbock-Fermor. Through Römer, Sachse took on leadership of the "North Group" of the Berlin-based "Revolutionäre Arbeiter und Soldaten" ("Revolutionary Workers and Soldiers" / RAS) resistance group, which Römer had set up in the early summer of 1940. Available sources are silent on what the group did, but by September 1941 it comprised more than 200 people, with connections to similar organisations in Leipzig, Munich, Vienna, Innsbruck and Essen. Sachse was identified at that time as one of the group's three leaders. The RAS came under Gestapo surveillance, and on 2 February 1942 he was one of 66 group members arrested. By this stage his son, Werner Sachse, had already been killed in the war. Willy Sachse spent two years held in investigatory detention in police prisons and concentration camps. He was condemned to death by the special "People's Court" on 7 June 1944 and executed (shot) at the Brandenburg Prison on 21 August 1944.
