= Paul Franken =

German politician and journalist (1894–1944)

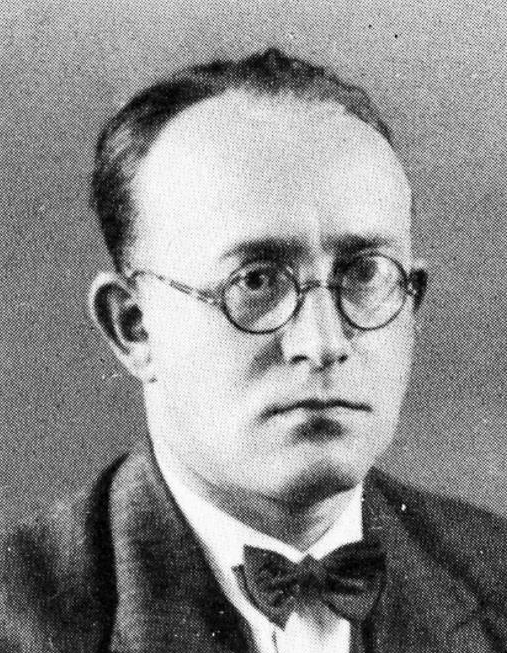
- Franken c. 1932

Member of the Landtag of Prussia for Merseburg
- In office 14 June 1928 – 7 July 1933
- Preceded by: Multi-member district
- Succeeded by: Constituency abolished
- In office 10 March 1921 – 5 January 1925
- Preceded by: Constituency established
- Succeeded by: Multi-member district

Personal details
- Born: 27 June 1894 Solingen, Rhine Province, Kingdom of Prussia, German Empire
- Died: Autumn 1944 (aged 50) Near Vorkuta, Komi ASSR, Soviet Union
- Party: SPD (1911–1917, 1922–1936); USPD (1917–1920, 1922); KPD (1920–1922, after 1936); KAG (1922)
- Spouse: Flora Goldberg (m. 1920)
- Children: Peter
- Occupation: Politician; Newspaper Editor; Metal Worker

Military service
- Allegiance: German Empire
- Years of service: 1914–1918
- Battles/wars: World War I
- Central institution membership: 1920–1922: Member, KPD Central Commission; Other offices held: 1918–1919: Chairman, Solingen Workers' and Soldiers' Council

Paul Franken (27 June 1894 – Autumn 1944) was a German socialist newspaper editor and politician who served in the Landtag of Prussia from 1921 to 1925 and again from 1928 to 1933, during which he represented four separate socialist parties.

Following the Nazi seizure of power in January 1933, the Social Democratic Party, to which he belonged, was banned, and he fled the country. He lived in Czechoslovakia and Sweden before settling in the Soviet Union, where in 1936 he was briefly arrested. He was arrested again in 1937 during the Great Purge. He was detained for the next seven years and is believed to have died in a labour camp near Vorkuta during the autumn of 1944.

== Life ==
Paul Franken was born in Höhscheid (Solingen), some 40 km (25 miles) east of Düsseldorf in the heavily industrialised Ruhr region of Germany. His father was a foundry worker. Franken attended school locally and in 1908 started training as a specialist metal worker (Former & Nadler). In 1911 he joined the Social Democratic Party (SPD / Sozialdemokratische Partei Deutschlands) and after the outbreak of the First World War in 1914 he was conscripted for military service. In 1917 he joined the newly-formed Independent Social Democratic Party (USPD / Unabhängige Sozialdemokratische Partei Deutschlands) which had broken away from the mainstream SPD, primarily over the issue of whether or not to continue funding war credits.

During the revolutionary period that followed the end of the war Franken served as chairman of the Workers' and Soldiers' Council in the Solingen district. On the political left there was further factionalism and fragmentation during the years that followed, and in 1920 Franken joined the Communist Party of Germany (KPD / Kommunistische Partei Deutschlands), serving on its Central Commission. It was probably around this time, in 1920, that he married the fellow left-wing activist, Flora Goldberg (1899–1991). In June 1920 he stood, unsuccessfully, for election to the Reichstag as a Communist candidate. Following the March Action in 1921, he supported Paul Levi in criticizing the failed uprising and joined the Communist Working Group (KAG / Kommunistische Arbeitsgemeinschaft) at the beginning of 1922, but this movement proved short-lived and by May 1922 Franken was back in the USPD. In the meantime, he was elected a member of the Prussian Landtag (regional legislative assembly) where he sat till 1924, and again between 1928 and 1933, representing the Merseburg district. In the meantime, in 1922 he switched his party affiliation back to the SPD. In addition, between 1922 he was working as a writer and newspaper editor in Solingen.

In 1924 the couple relocated to Zeitz, some 450 km (280 miles) to the east, where Flora Franken, who joined the SPD in 1925 sat on the district council till 1933. Paul Franken became a member of the SPD local leadership team in Zeitz where from November 1924 he was also editing the SPD daily newspaper, (Zeitzer) "Volksbote". He was active in the cultural and educational fields, working in the SPD's Reichsarbeitsgemeinschaft der Kinderfreunde / RAG (loosely National Children's Friendly Society). In 1928, after a break of four years, he returned to the Landtag (Prussian regional legislative assembly).

The Nazi Party took power in January 1933 and lost little time in transforming the country into a one-party state. During 1933 Paul Franken's membership of the Landtag (Prussian regional legislative assembly), like the assembly itself, came to an end after a few months. Flora Franken, who was both Jewish and a Socialist, had even more reason to fear the Nazis than her husband, and emigrated to Riga, joining her mother in Latvia. Paul Franken either accompanied her or emigrated via Czechoslovakia. Either way, they were both in Latvia when Kārlis Ulmanis in May 1934 took power, obliging them to escape from a new single party right-wing dictatorship for the second time in less than two years. They moved to Sweden, and applied for permission to emigrate to the Soviet Union. The Soviet authorities granted their application in August 1934 and they moved to Leningrad (as St. Petersburg was known at that time).

In Leningrad Paul Franken worked at the vast Putilov Factory. In May 1936 he was accepted back into the KPD, now overwhelmingly exiled, its members based mostly in Paris or Moscow. In November 1937, during the Great Purge, he was arrested by the NKVD and detained. He was taken to one of the network of Labour camps located inside the Arctic Circle. Here, under appalling conditions, he died in the autumn of 1944 in the labour camp at Adak near Vorkuta.

Flora Franken, who had accompanied her husband to the Soviet Union in 1934, was permitted to return to the German Democratic Republic with her son, Peter, in May 1955. She took a job with Dietz Verlag (the Berlin publishing house), later switching to the (closely associated) Marxism–Leninism Institute of East Germany's ruling Socialist Unity Party (Central Committee).
