= Heinrich Böschen =

German politician

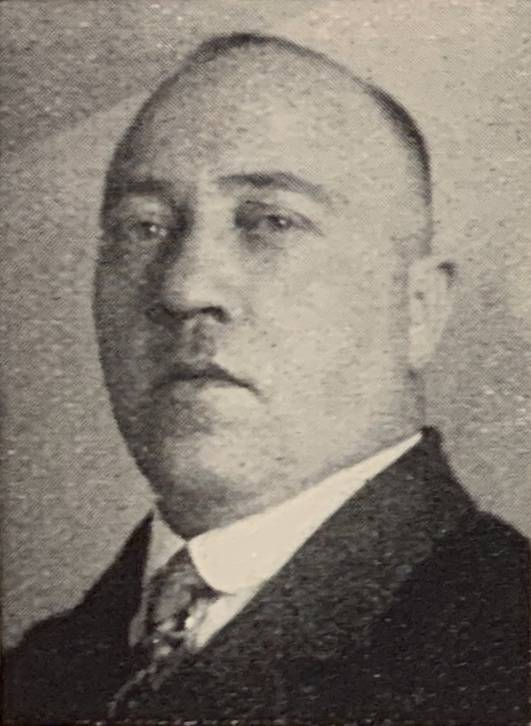
- Böschen c. 1928
- Born: Heinrich Böschen; 27 October 1887; Bremen, Germany
- Died: 31 December 1945 (aged 58) (officially entered date of death: actual date and circumstances of death unknown)
- Occupation: Politician
- Political party: SPD (1906); USPD (1917); KPD (1920)
- Central institution membership: 1921–1925: Member, KPD Central Commission

Heinrich Böschen (born 27 October 1887; presumed to have died following disappearance on 31 December 1945) was a German Communist politician and trade unionist.

During the Nazi period he was detained by the state: by the end of World War II he had disappeared. After the continuing absence of information on what had happened to him, in 1959 it was deemed for the administrative convenience of government authorities that he had officially died on 31 December 1945.

== Life ==
Böschen trained to follow his father into the building trade and in 1906 joined the Building Workers' League of the Free Trade Unions. He also joined the left-wing SPD party. War broke out in 1914 and in 1917 the SPD split in two, primarily over the issue of continuing support for the war. Böschen went with the Independent Social Democratic Party (USPD / Unabhängige Sozialdemokratische Partei Deutschlands). The political left in Germany continued to fracture during the revolutionary year that followed military defeat. In October 1920 Böschen was a USPD delegate at the Danzig meeting which resulted in his party's left wing majority merging itself into the German Communist Party (KPD).

He then relocated to the Rhineland, where he worked as an official of the Metal Workers' Union. Between 1921 and 1926 he was a membership of the KPD (party) leadership team in the Solingen subdistrict. From 1921 till 1923 he was also an elected member of the party national committee. In 1926 he became party secretary for trades union matters in the Lower Rhine region. In 1928 regional elections he was elected a member of the Prussian regional legislative assembly (Landtag), representing the Düsseldorf-East electoral district.

In 1929 he took charge of party organisation in the Lower Rhine district. He took part as a delegate in the 1929 Communist Party Conference. As the economic and political situation in Germany deteriorated, in 1930 he gave up his regional job in charge of party organisation. Instead, in 1931, he became the Policy Head of the Unity Association of Building Workers in the Revolutionary Trades Union Opposition movement.

January 1933 saw the beginning of Germany's twelve Nazi years. A priority for the new government was the rapid establishment in Germany of one-party government, and the new Chancellor had, in opposition, been particularly vitriolic about the Communist Party. Böschen was one of many German communists to find themselves arrested. He was given a 33-month prison sentence, following which he would be held for a longer period in concentration camps. War returned in 1939 and he was conscripted into Organisation Todt. By May 1945, when the war formally ended, Heinrich Böschen had disappeared. In 1959 he was officially declared dead, deemed for official purposes to have died on 31 December 1945.
