= Max Silbermann =

German politician (1896–1968)

Max Silbermann (18 January 1896 - 5 February 1968) was a German politician (USPD, KPD). He served as a member of the Saxon regional parliament ("Landtag") between 1931 and 1933.

== Life ==
Silbermann was born in Ehrenberg (Kriebstein), a village in the hills between Leipzig and Dresden. His father was a brewer. As a young man he trained and worked as a gardener and as a furrier. Between 1914 and 1918 he performed military service as a soldier during the First World War.

He joined the Independent Social Democratic Party ("Unabhängige Sozialdemokratische Partei Deutschlands" / USPD). The USPD had been launched two years earlier as a breakaway group from the mainstream Social Democratic Party (SPD), following intensification of the internal party ructions that had been triggered by the party leadership decision reluctantly to support funding for the war in parliamentary votes. Its founding members took inspiration from Rosa Luxemburg and Karl Liebknecht, and came from the anti-war left-wing wing of the SPD. Following further fragmentation on the political left the USPD broke apart, and while a minority returned to the SPD, most of the activists went with the majority and became members of the recently launched Communist Party. Silbermann became a Communist Party member in 1921. Between 1924 and 1930 he was a works council chairman, and in 1926 he took on leadership of the Factory Workers' Union at Waldheim. Within the party he was a member of the regional party leadership team ("Bezirksleitung") for Erzgebirge-Vogtland. From 1929 he was also regional party secretary for the Döbeln-Riesa subregion ("Unterbezirk"). On 18 June 1931 he became a member of the regional parliament ("Sächsischer Landtag"), taking the seat vacated by Herbert Wehner who had moved to Berlin in order to work with Walter Ulbricht and August Creutzburg for the party politburo.

The Nazis took power in January 1933 and lost no time in transforming the country into a one-party dictatorship. Political activity became illegal and after the Reichstag fire at the end of February it was obvious that the authorities were particularly concerned to eliminate Communist Party activism. On 9 March 1933 Max Silbermann was arrested, together with Miss Gimmer, the typist who worked for the Communist Party group in the regional parliament. The regional parliament held its final sitting on 22 August 1933 and formally dissolved itself on 30 January 1934. Silbermann was held in "protective custody" in various concentration camps till the beginning of September 1935. After his release he remained under close police surveillance. In 1936 Silbermann moved from Saxony to the south of Germany where he engaged in "illegal work" against the Nazi régime. He was rearrested and detained in 1942, but his period of detention was relatively brief. In 1944 he was in contact with the Resistance in Alsace. In 1945 he settled on the eastern side of the Rhine and was a Communist Party official in Baden, under French military occupation between 1945 and 1949 . In 1947 he returned home to Saxony which during this period was administered as part of the Soviet occupation zone. For some time Silbermann served as Döbeln district secretary of the Peasants Mutual Aid Association ("Vereinigung der gegenseitigen Bauernhilfe" / , VdgB). This was one of the mass organisations being set up in the Soviet zone as part of the transition towards the Leninist model of one-party dictatorship. He now lived, till his death, in Ehrenberg, the village of his birth.
